= Lyall Munro Jnr =

Aboriginal Australian elder

Lyall Thomas Munro Jnr (born 1951) is an Aboriginal Australian elder, a former activist and member of many organisations serving Aboriginal Australians. He is known as a local leader in the town of Moree, New South Wales. He is the son of Lyall Munro Snr, and the husband of Jenny Munro.

== Early life and education ==
Lyall Thomas Munro, a Gamilaroi man, was born in Moree, New South Wales, in 1951, one of 12 children of Lyall Munro Snr and Carmine Munro. Lloyd Munro, as of 2021 vice-chair of the Moree Local Aboriginal Land Council, is a brother. They lived on New Moree Mission.

He first attended Moree Aboriginal School. The children were not allowed out of the school, and Moree had a reputation for being a racist town. Munro recalled that it was only the Lebanese Australian traders who would sell to Aboriginal people at the mission. Aboriginal people were not allowed to try clothes on in the shops in the town.

When Lyall was 13, in 1965, the Freedom Ride led by Charles Perkins drove into Moree. The activists took six young Aboriginal boys, including his nine-year-old brother Dan, from Moree Mission to the segregated swimming pool. Dan was one of the first to get into the pool. Lyall joined the bus on a trip from the mission to the town, and recalls being pelted with things by the local townspeople.

He later attended the De la Salle College in Armidale (now O'Connor Catholic College), and at the age of 14, attained his instructor's badge in lifesaving.

== Early working life ==
Munro moved to Sydney in 1967 or 1968 with his cousin Sammy Munro, and while staying with relatives at Bondi Junction went out and met other Aboriginal people at the Foundation for Aboriginal Affairs.

He worked at various places on the Central Coast, New South Wales, including Umina, Newcastle, and Wagga Wagga, returning to Moree in 1969 before going to work on cotton farms in Wee Waa in 1972. The workers formed the Wee Waa Aboriginal Cotton Chippers Caucus and went on strike there in protest against poor wages, which was successful. During this time he met Ghillar Michael Anderson and Billy Craigie, who were co-founders of the Aboriginal Tent Embassy in January 1972, as well as Paul Coe and Sol Bellear, from the new Aboriginal Legal Service (ALS).

In 1972 met his future wife Jenny Coe, younger sister of Paul Coe and Isabel Coe, in Sydney. Billy Craigie later married Isabel.

== Activism ==
Munro participated in the setting up of the Aboriginal Tent Embassy in 1972; the 1982 Commonwealth Games protests; 1988 Bicentennial protests; anti-Bjelke-Petersen actions in Queensland; and the dismantling of the gates of the Parliament House, Sydney, and Parliament House, Brisbane, after negotiations concerning Aboriginal land rights had failed to produce any result. He saw Paul Coe and Billy Craigie as heroes of resistance, and John Newfong as a brilliant Aboriginal journalist. His father, Lyall Munro Snr, also joined some of the protests, as did some parents of other activists.

Moree is close to the Queensland border, and many of the Aboriginal people have relatives in both states, and there are many ties between Moree and Cherbourg Aboriginal communities. Munro regards himself as a Murri, and was proud to be involved in activism in Queensland, where racism was rife and the laws oppressive.

He acted as a spokesperson when a 19-year-old Aboriginal man was shot and killed by white people in Moree in 1982.

He later said:

We revelled in the struggle of the ’70s, if we disagreed with an institution, we walked into their headquarters and simply took over the building and occupied it until we were moved.

In 2014, Munro, his wife Jenny Munro, and other activists set up the Redfern Aboriginal Tent Embassy, to protest against a planned redevelopment, known as the Pemulwuy Project, by the Aboriginal Housing Company of The Block in the Sydney suburb of Redfern.

== Career ==
Munro was a founding member of the NSW Aboriginal Legal Service (ALS), and the Aboriginal Housing Company, and has served many other Aboriginal organisations, including the Black Theatre, Redfern Aboriginal Children's Services, Redfern All Blacks, and the National Aboriginal and Torres Strait Islander Legal Services (Note: NATILS was formed in 2007; not sure what part Munro played in it. A 1981 photograph refers to National Aboriginal Legal Services.). (Note: Some sources say that he was involved in the Aboriginal Medical Service in Redfern, but according to quite a comprehensive overview of the first 20 years of that organisation by Gary Foley, he is not mentioned, hence not included in this article.)

In 1976, Munro was one of 11 directors at the Aboriginal Housing Company in Redfern, Sydney.

In 1981 he was photographed by Juno Gemes speaking at Parliament House, Sydney, as a representative of National Aboriginal Legal Services.

In 1984 he was elected chairman of the ALS, succeeding Paul Coe, after working for the service for 10 years as a field officer and administrator. In the same year, he became the inaugural co-ordinator of National Aboriginal and Islander Legal Service Secretariat (NAILSS), and, together with Paul Coe and Sugar Ray Robinson, travelled to Geneva, Switzerland, as delegates to the United Nations Human Rights Council in 1984 and 1985. He spent some time in Strasbourg, running a program and giving lectures at the International Institute of Human Rights. However he missed Australia and felt lonely in Europe, so vowed never to leave Australia again.

== Recognition ==
Munro is mentioned in several articles in Dawn magazine between 1963 and 1973.

A photographic portrait of Munro taken by renowned Aboriginal photographer Mervyn Bishop is included in the Sydney Elders exhibition at the Australian Museum. The exhibition was mounted in 2012, and represents a selection of Elders who have "contributed to the important role of culture, education, health, community or social justice".

As of 2021 he is known as a local leader in Moree.

== Family ==
Munro's wife is Jenny Munro. Lyall and Jenny have six children together, joining his daughter from his previous marriage: Donna, Jason, Mary, Raymond, Malika, Lorna and Lyall Jnr. Jason features with Lyall Jnr in a photograph taken by Juno Gemes at Erambie Mission in 1978.

Munro is known by the nickname "Lyally Mo" to close friends.
