= Redfern Aboriginal Children's Services =

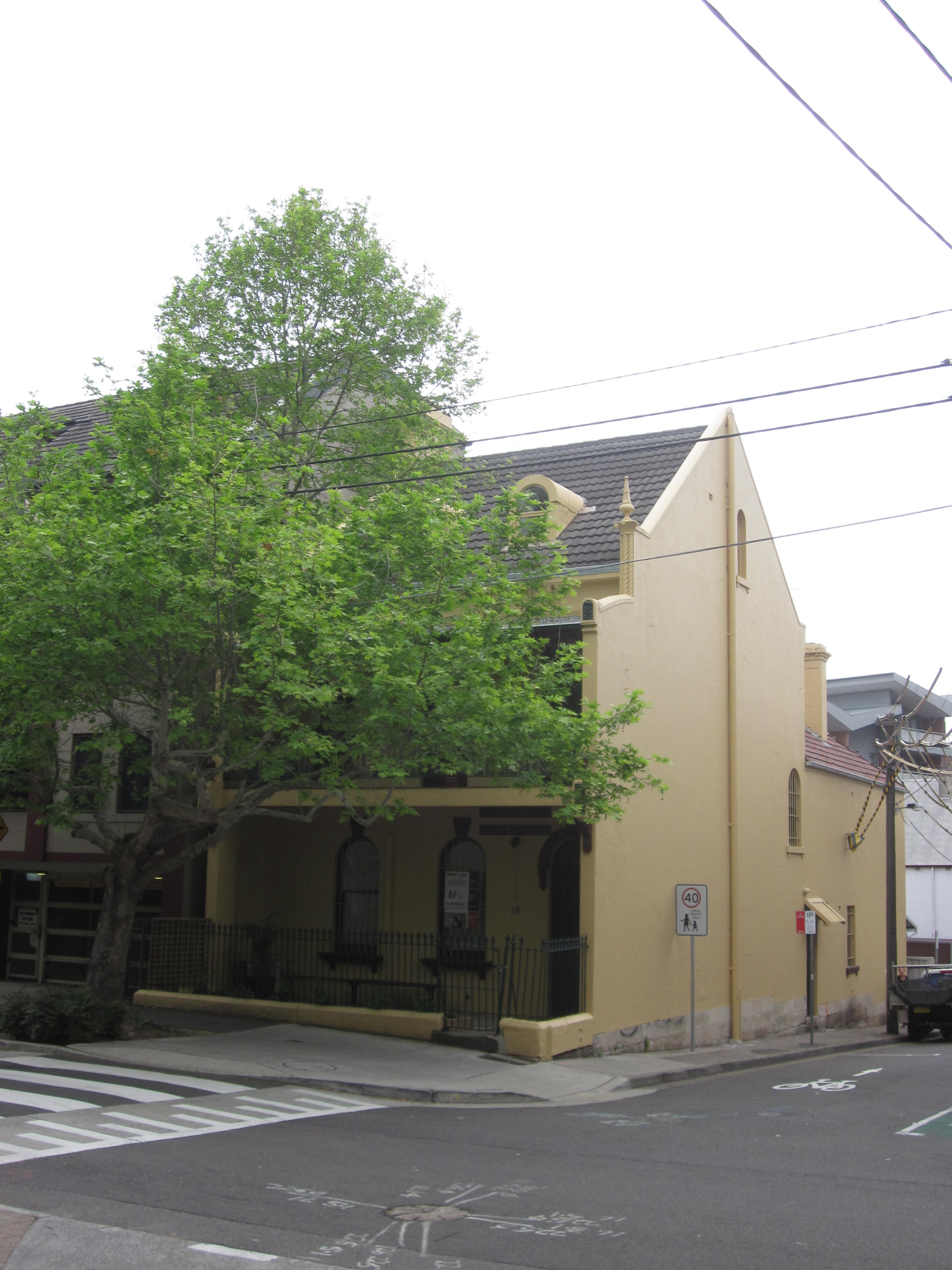
- Redfern Aboriginal Children's Services, 18 George Street, Redfern, NSW

- Location within Sydney Location within Australia
- 33°53′24″S 151°12′09″E
- Location: 18 George Street, Redfern, City of Sydney, New South Wales, Australia

History
- Built: 1874–1875

Site notes
- Architectural style: Victorian Filigree
- Owner: Aboriginal Children's Service Ltd

New South Wales Heritage Register
- Official name: Redfern Aboriginal Children's Services and Archives; ACS; Denholme
- Type: State heritage (built)
- Designated: 13 July 2015
- Reference no.: 1951
- Type: Historic site
- Category: Aboriginal

The Redfern Aboriginal Children's Services, also known as Redfern Aboriginal Children's Services and Archives, or simply Aboriginal Children's Services (ACS), is a community services organisation for Indigenous Australian children in Sydney, Australia.

The heritage-listed building, also known as Denholme, is a former residence, built from 1874 to 1875. It is located at 18 George Street in the inner western Sydney suburb of Redfern in the City of Sydney local government area of New South Wales. It was added to the New South Wales State Heritage Register on 13 July 2015.

== History ==
=== History of the suburb of Redfern ===
The area now known as Redfern was once defined by sand hills and swamps, which would have provided an abundant supply of food for the Gadigal people before white settlement (the Gadigal are a clan of the Eora Nation). Although colonisation was destructive, Gadigal culture survived. As the town of Sydney grew, the Gadigal were joined by other Aboriginal people from around NSW to live and work as an urban Aboriginal community. Redfern was one such place where Aboriginal people sought shelter and connection with family and community and continue to do so today.

The name Redfern originates from an early land grant to William Redfern in 1817. It was previously known as Robert's Farm and Boxley's Swamp. The boundaries of Redfern's 40-hectare (100-acre) grant were approximately the present-day Cleveland, Regent, Redfern and Elizabeth Streets. Redfern's grant was subdivided and advertised for sale in allotments of between 1 and 2 hectares (2 and 5 acres) in 1834. George Street was named in a subsequent Redfern Estate Subdivision Sale in 1842. The passing of the Sydney Slaughterhouses Act 1849 brought industry to the district. This Act banned abattoirs and noxious trades from the city so many tanners, wool scourers and wool-washers, boiling down works and abattoirs moved their businesses outside city boundaries to Redfern and Waterloo. The sand hills still existed, but by the late 1850s Redfern was a flourishing suburb housing 6,500 people.

The Municipalities Act 1858 gave districts the option of municipal incorporation. Public meetings were held and after a flurry of petitions Redfern Municipality was proclaimed on 11 August 1859, the fourth in Sydney to be formed under the Act. Redfern Town Hall opened in 1870 and the Albert Cricket Ground in 1864. Redfern Post Office came in 1882. By the end of the 19th century Redfern consisted of a mix of market gardens, industry and housing.

=== House located at 18 George Street ===
18 George Street first appears in the Sands Directory in 1871 as a piece of vacant land next to a boot maker. The first reference to a building on the site is the residence "Denholme", home of John Williamson Solicitor in 1875. In 1873 John Williamson solicitor had an office at 126 Elizabeth Street and was living in Manono Cottage in Cleveland Street, Redfern. By 1876 John Williamson solicitor of Elizabeth Street is noted as having his private residence in George Street, Redfern. The house called Denholme, 18 George Street, Redfern must therefore have been built between 1873 and 1875. John Williamson resided at 18 (listed as 20) George Street until 1889.

By 1890 the house was still called Denholm (although without the e) and the new the resident was Frederick Chapman, prothonotary. (A prothonotary was a Clerk of the court.) On the adjacent corner were King and Grills grocers.

Redfern Municipal Council was amalgamated with the City of Sydney in 1949 and was one of the few municipalities to produce a Town Plan. The Town Plan, completed in 1948, was not implemented but involved demolition of all the housing stock and construction of tower blocks set in park land. 18 George Street would have been demolished if this plan had been implemented.

=== Aboriginal activism ===
The twentieth century saw increased political activism amongst Aboriginal people and the growth of organisations for the achievement of changes to the constitution. Poor housing and living conditions increased demand for services and facilities for urban Aboriginal people. Having a large Aboriginal population, the suburb of Redfern was a particular focus for activism around civil and land rights for Aboriginal and Torres Strait Islander people. In the 1960s and 1970s Aboriginal people living in Redfern were the subject of unofficial policing methods such as a ten o clock curfew. If an Aboriginal person was found on the street after 10pm they were arrested whether or not they had committed any crime. In 1970 a group of activists came together to provide legal representation for Aboriginal people who were otherwise unaware of their rights. Paul Coe, Isabel Coe, Gary Williams, Gary Foley and Tony Coorey sought help from Hal Wootten, the Professor of Law at the University of New South Wales and together they set up the Aboriginal Legal Service. The service was based in Redfern and received a small amount of funding from the Australian Government. The Redfern Aboriginal Legal Service was so successful it led to the creation of similar services around the country.

In July 1971 another ground-breaking service for Aboriginal people was established in Redfern. The Aboriginal Medical Service provided free health care to the Aboriginal people. The service helped provide nutrition advice as well as general health care for people who were often living in crowded conditions. One of the founders of the service was Shirley Smith (Mum Shirl).

Around this time a men's group was busy providing a fruit and vegetable program as well as a breakfast program to ensure families received nutrition and at least one meal a day was available to those in the community who needed it. There were other pioneering organisations around this time that were established by the Redfern Aboriginal community. These include the Aboriginal Housing Company, Black Theatre and Murawina. In 1972 a development company started buying large blocks of housing and forcibly evicting the Aboriginal tenants. With the help of the Builders Labourers Federation a group of people reoccupied some of the properties and refused to move. The BLF placed a ban on development. In 1973 the Aboriginal Housing Company was incorporated and granted federal funding to purchase "the Block". Black Theatre was an Aboriginal-run theatre company established in 1972. Murawina started as a breakfast program in Newtown in 1972 and became a child care centre in Redfern in 1974 and then grew to take on other roles such as housing referrals and a meeting place for Aboriginal women. Later that decade in 1979 saw the founding of Aboriginal Dance Theatre Redfern (ADTR) and in 1981 Radio Redfern commenced with a small slot on 2SER.

Redfern in the 1970s was a pivotal place in the revolution taking place in Aboriginal affairs in Australia. Aboriginal people were actively resisting oppression and successfully organising themselves to overcome poverty, housing issues and poor health care. Providing services for Aboriginal children was a part of this revolution in autonomy and a reaction to the continued removal of children and the need for culturally-specific foster care.

In 1969 the Aborigines Protection Act was abolished, officially ending the routine removal of Aboriginal children from their families under the policy of assimilation. By 1985 however the Standing Committee on Social Welfare acknowledged the problems still inherent in the child welfare sector whereby there was a "...reluctance of welfare authorities to accept the basic differences between Aboriginal and non--Aboriginal societies in terms of family concepts and child care practices, particularly the concept of the extended Aboriginal family and the complex system of kinship relationships and obligations that are of fundamental importance to the Aboriginal childrearing process."

Aboriginal people publicly voiced their concerns that Aboriginal children must be fostered with Aboriginal families and kinship ties considered in child placements at the First Australian Conference on Adoption held in 1976. It wasn't until 1987 however that the Aboriginal Child Placement Principle was developed, although the Redfern Aboriginal Child Services had been taking this approach from the very start of their organisation 11 years earlier.

Redfern Aboriginal Children's Services was started in 1975 and provided a range of child welfare and family support services with a particular focus on foster care. Mum Shirl, Isabel Coe, Bev Coe, Jenny Munro and Ann Weldon are some of the women who were involved in its success. Initially funding was provided by Australian Catholic Relief and later the NSW Department of Community Services took over the funding arrangements. Australian Government also provided grants intermittently. The Canberra Times in July 1978 reported that the Department of Social Services announced a grant of $18,550 to Aboriginal Children's Services in Redfern at the start of "National Aborigines Week". The grant was to fund the leasing and furnishing of a house and employing a house parent to give Aboriginal children temporary emergency accommodation. The service was provided with NSW government funding until 2008 when it was withdrawn. It was considered that among other things, ACS did not meet contemporary training, accommodation and governance requirements. Redfern Aboriginal Children's Services found that demands for increased accountability to government and escalating service costs in an environment of diminishing resources put undue pressure on the organisation. The service continues today with sponsorship from a not-for-profit organisation, undertaking a variety of charitable works and advocacy.

=== Establishment of the Aboriginal Children's Service ===
The creation of the Aboriginal Children's Service was in direct response to the cultural issues Aboriginal children faced when fostered to non-Indigenous families. The Canberra Times reported in 1980 of a study by sociology students from the University of NSW which demonstrated Aboriginal children were repeatedly fostered in white families and in institutions. The article quotes the study as follows: "The placing of Aboriginal children in white foster homes has a very high failure rate, according to the findings of the Aboriginal Children's Service. The service finds that Aboriginal children are on average placed with three or more different families. Aboriginal children who have been removed from their families often spend considerable periods in establishments run by the various institutions. . . . Few reasons are offered, by those who deal with Aboriginal children, for the continued institutionalization of them other than they continue not to conform to white patterns of socialization." The article concludes that Aboriginal children should only be adopted by Aboriginal families and that Aboriginal community organizations such as ACS must be the focal point for adoptions; experience having shown that they were more successful in dealing with the culturally specific needs of Aboriginal children.

Redfern Aboriginal Children's Services were instrumental in the change in child welfare policy in NSW. The Redfern organization, established by the community and run by mostly volunteers, changed the way in which Aboriginal children's services were provided in NSW; these changes remain in place today. Redfern Aboriginal Children's Services also influenced mainstream policies which led to the current practice known as "kinship care" where priority is given to placing the removed child with family members. In the case of an Aboriginal child if no family member is available the child is placed with an Aboriginal family within their community. If no Aboriginal carers are available then the child will be placed with non-Indigenous carers but given access to the Aboriginal community.

There are numerous Aboriginal women associated with Redfern Aboriginal Children's Services whom played a vital part in its establishment and ongoing success. (There were six Wiradjuri women involved in the foundation: Colleen Shirley Perry, Isabel Coe, Jenny Munro, Vilma Ryan and Sylvia Scott). Colleen Shirley Perry was a Wiradjuri woman born on Erambie Mission, West Cowra, New South Wales, around 1924. Her extensive work providing support for prisoners earned her the name "MumShirl". She was appointed as a Member of the Order of the British Empire and Member of the Order of Australia for her welfare work. She raised 60 foster children over her lifetime and was involved in the establishment of the Redfern Aboriginal Children's Services. Isabel Coe was also a Wiradjuri woman who was from the Erambie Mission. She was one of the Aboriginal activists involved in establishing the Aboriginal Tent Embassy in Canberra in January 1972 and remained involved in maintaining it into the 1990s. She also played a key role in establishing several important organisations in Redfern, including the Aboriginal Children’s Services. In the 1990s she was a member of the Indigenous Advisory Council supporting the National Inquiry into the Separation of Aboriginal and Torres Strait Islander Children from Their Families.

=== People ===
Jenny Munro began working at the Aboriginal Children's Service as a trainee bookkeeper and then as administrator in 1979. She was also actively involved in advocacy for policy change with regards to Aboriginal children. She was a member of the Secretariat of National Aboriginal and Islander Child Care (SNAICC) in its early days, and one of its first chairpersons. Her husband, Lyall Munro Jnr, also worked at ACS at some point.

Vilma Ryan worked with the Aboriginal Children's Service, where she served as a voice and guide for hundreds of Aboriginal children involved in the court system, advocating for their placement in foster homes with Aboriginal carers. She also served on the board of directors of Redfern's Murrawina Preschool and was a longstanding advocate for Aboriginal education. In 2000, she was a torch bearer for the Sydney Olympic Games. Her long-standing activism and pride in her Wiradjuri heritage were recognised when she received a 2012 NSW Seniors Week Achievement Award.

Sylvia Scott was born on a mission in Cowra. Working with Aboriginal women she founded Murrawina pre-school for Aboriginal children, one of the first Aboriginal-run organisations in Sydney, where she served as their president for 17 years. In the 1980s Scott also set up a general skills program at Petersham TAFE and worked at the Children's Hospital Camperdown as an Aboriginal health worker. She died in hospital aged 83 in 2011.

=== Locations ===
The service was located in a number of locations prior to the move to 18 George Street. In 1980 it was located at 31- 33 Regent Street, Redfern and the director at that time was Ann Weldon. Weldon is a member of the Wiradjuri Nation and was one of the founding members of the NSW Aboriginal Children's Service and Inner West Aboriginal Community Company. Ann has held executive positions on a number of boards and committees for over three decades, including the Metropolitan Local Aboriginal Land Council and Marrickville Aboriginal Consultative Committee. Among Weldon's achievements was being the first female CEO of the Aboriginal Legal Service and the first CEO of the NSW Aboriginal Land Council. Weldon has also been elected to the Sydney ATSIC Regional Council as a councillor and as the chairperson and deputy chairperson. Weldon was appointed to the NSW Aboriginal Housing Board in 1998.

In 1975 Aboriginal Children's Services were also established at Cowra, St Marys, and Wagga Wagga. The demographic in Redfern today has changed substantially since the 1970s. The suburb has become increasingly gentrified and Aboriginal people have been moved on to areas such as Waterloo. Services supporting the Aboriginal community have followed. Redfern Aboriginal Children's Services is now an increasingly rare example of the community based services which were once available in Redfern.

== Description ==
18 George Street is a three-storey (split level) Victorian Filigree style gentleman's town house with an attic and additions to the rear. Constructed in 1874 the building has a spacious interior on the ground floor and large bedrooms upstairs. The exterior walls are rendered brick with sandstone lintels, the main roof and the verandah roof have been clad in textured metal tiles. The roof over the rear wing is clad with terracotta tiles. There are two simple arched dormer windows facing the street and one facing the rear. The verandah valence and columns are wrought iron lace and the front fence has iron pickets on a stone base. The front ground floor verandah is paved with large slabs of sandstone. The former garden area between the verandah and front fence has been paved with concrete. Windows are arched with traditional decorative Victorian mouldings.

The ground floor hall and rear service rooms are tiled, otherwise the building is carpeted throughout. The front hall has a feature mural which is depicted on both sides of the dividing wall. This mural is valuable for its ability to demonstrate the function of the building as Aboriginal Children's Services. There is a split door with a counter shelf under the mural which may relate to the children's services use as well. The two front rooms are the most intact rooms on the ground floor and have original ornate ceilings, windows and fireplaces. Likewise the first floor main rooms are relatively intact, together with the front verandah. The staircase is original retaining its decorative stringers and banisters and panelling beneath the stairs. The attic has new linings and new windows.

There is a steel garage addition to the rear and the area beside the rear wing has been enclosed.

=== Condition ===
Redfern Aboriginal Children's Services building is highly intact. The intactness of the archive is unknown.

== Heritage listing ==
As at 20 November 2014, the Redfern Aboriginal Children's Service & Archives is of state significance because it was instrumental in bringing about a substantial shift in government policy regarding the care of Aboriginal children as well as being influential in the introduction of the "kinship care" policy for non-Indigenous children. Redfern Aboriginal Children's Services & Archives provides evidence of cultural and traditional ways of cooperating and caring for each other being translated to an urban setting. Along with Redfern Aboriginal Legal Service, the Aboriginal Housing Company and the Aboriginal Medical Service, the Redfern ACS was one of the pivotal Aboriginal organizations in the 1970s revolution in self-determination that occurred in Redfern. Redfern Aboriginal Children's Services at 18 George Street, Redfern is now a rare example of Aboriginal service providers as the suburb has become increasingly gentrified and the services have left with the Aboriginal population.

Redfern Aboriginal Children's Services & Archives is an early example of children's services established by Aboriginal people specifically for the placement of Aboriginal children. The service is an excellent example of resistance against the policy of removing Aboriginal children from their family, culture and community and successfully establishing kinship ties as an important consideration in child placements. 18 George Street is an excellent example of a building adapted for use by Aboriginal Children's Services.

Redfern Aboriginal Children's Services has historical association with a number of key figures in Aboriginal politics and welfare provision including Isabel Coe, Jenny Munro, Mum Shirl, Ann Weldon, Vilma Ryan and Sylvia Scott.

18 George Street also houses important historical archives documenting the operation of ACS, including information about each foster child.

Redfern Aboriginal Children's Services was listed on the New South Wales State Heritage Register on 13 July 2015 having satisfied the following criteria.

The place is important in demonstrating the course, or pattern, of cultural or natural history in New South Wales.

Redfern Aboriginal Children's Services was instrumental in bringing about a substantial shift in government policy regarding the care of Aboriginal children that were removed from their parents. Redfern Aboriginal Children's Services also influenced policy for non-Indigenous children leading to the current practice known as "kinship care" where priority is given to placing the removed child with family members. In the case of Aboriginal children the emphasis is placed upon finding culturally appropriate carers, something that was not considered important prior to the establishment of the Redfern ACS.

Redfern Aboriginal Children's Services provides evidence of the revolution in Aboriginal self-determination that occurred in Redfern in the 1970s. The service demonstrates the displacement caused by government policy and the success of the Aboriginal community in reclaiming their right to care for their own kin and run their own affairs. The Redfern ACS is an integral part of the story of Redfern.

The place has a strong or special association with a person, or group of persons, of importance of cultural or natural history of New South Wales's history.

The establishment and ongoing running of the Redfern Aboriginal Children's Services is associated with several influential Aboriginal women whose activism led to social change including Isabel Coe, Ann Weldon, Colleen Shirley Perry (Mum Shirl), Jenny Monroe, Vilma Ryan and Sylvia Scott.

The place is important in demonstrating aesthetic characteristics and/or a high degree of creative or technical achievement in New South Wales.

18 George Street is a multi level free standing town house that demonstrates the Victorian Filigree architectural style and exhibits the aspirations of a gentleman solicitor in 1874. There are parts of the interior which relate to its use by the Aboriginal Children's Services such as the double sided mural in the entrance hall. The building has aesthetic value at a local level.

The place has a strong or special association with a particular community or cultural group in New South Wales for social, cultural or spiritual reasons.

The Redfern Aboriginal Children's Services has strong social significance for the contemporary Aboriginal community in Redfern, Sydney and NSW for a number of reasons. The place is symbolic as a safe place for Aboriginal children who were placed in care with kinship consideration. The hundreds of children who passed through the Redfern ACS would be expected to have strong memories of the service as it played a role during their removal from their parents.

Redfern Aboriginal Children's Services provides evidence of cultural and traditional ways of cooperating and caring for each other being translated to an urban setting. The Redfern ACS has always played a charitable role in the community and continues to do so today with services such as a free food delivery service and playgroup for mothers in the neighbourhood. For the past and present workers at Redfern Aboriginal Children's Services the place has spiritual significance as it is occupied by the spirit of ancestors/ board members who have passed on but continue to inhabit and care for the place.

The place has potential to yield information that will contribute to an understanding of the cultural or natural history of New South Wales.

There are substantial archives relating to the complete history of the Redfern Aboriginal Children's Service held on site. These archives have the potential to provide significant information about the organization as well as containing the records about each child that was fostered through the service. These archives have an elevated level of significance as no history of the service has been prepared to date and because adults who were fostered through the service may seek to inspect the records in order to connect with kin.

The place possesses uncommon, rare or endangered aspects of the cultural or natural history of New South Wales.

Redfern Aboriginal Children's Services was the original service from which other services grew. It is one of the few surviving organizations of its kind. It is among the pioneering organizations for the well-being and advancement of Aboriginal people that were based in Redfern, many of which have since relocated to other areas amid the gentrification of the suburb.

The place is important in demonstrating the principal characteristics of a class of cultural or natural places/environments in New South Wales.

Redfern Aboriginal Children's Services is an early example of children's services specifically for the placement of Aboriginal children. The service is an excellent example of resistance against the policy of removing Aboriginal children from their family, culture and community and successfully establishing kinship ties as an important consideration in child placements. 18 George Street is an excellent example of a building adapted for use by Aboriginal Children's Services.

== See also ==
- Aboriginal Medical Service
- Australian residential architectural styles
