= Paul Coe =

Australian activist and disbarred lawyer (1949–2025)

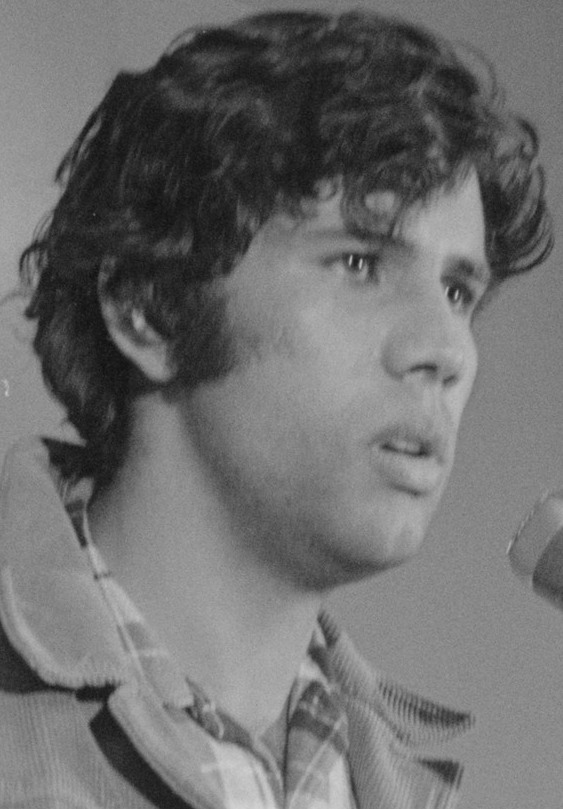
- Coe in 1970
- Born: Paul Thomas Ernest Coe; 4 February 1949; Erambie Mission, New South Wales, Australia
- Died: 29 July 2025 (aged 76); Sydney, New South Wales, Australia
- Education: Cowra High School
- Occupations: Activist; lawyer
- Years active: 1967–1990s

Paul Thomas Ernest Coe (4 February 1949 – 29 July 2025) was an Aboriginal Australian activist of Aboriginal rights and a former lawyer. He was a Wiradjuri man, born at Erambie Mission in Cowra, New South Wales. Well known for his lifelong advocacy of Aboriginal rights both civil (legal) and land rights. He studied law at the University of New South Wales (the first Aboriginal person to do so). He was the founding figure in the establishment of the Aboriginal Legal Service in 1970, in Redfern (Sydney), which provides free legal aid and advocacy for Aboriginal people (first in New South Wales and then expanded to all states and territories). He was also a key figure in the establishment of the Aboriginal Medical Service in 1971 (also in Redfern); the Aboriginal Tent Embassy on the lawns of Australian federal parliament house in Canberra in 1972; and the Redfern Aboriginal Children's Services in 1975. He initiated his landmark Coe vs Commonwealth case in the Australian High Court in April 1979, in which he sought legal recognition of Aboriginal people having never ceded sovereignty of the continent of Australia by the British crown, establishing the major precursor for Eddie Mabo's greatly attenuated High Court case, 13 years later. He became the first Aboriginal person in New South Wales to be admitted as a barrister. In 1988 he represented Aboriginal peoples at the Working Group on Indigenous Populations in Geneva, contributing to the early drafting process that led to the United Nations Declaration on the Rights of Indigenous Peoples.

== Early life and education ==
Paul Thomas Ernest Coe was born on 4 February 1949 at Erambie Mission, near Cowra in New South Wales, to Leslie John Coe (1929–1980) and Agnes Ann Coe née Wedge (1931–2014). He was the eldest of their five children, siblings were: Isabell (1951–2012), Jenny, Mary (1956–1994) and Les John (1958–2019). He was a proud Wiradjuri man. His grandfather was Paul Joseph Coe (1902–1979), whom he was named after. He came from a strong family of tireless advocacy and fighting for their peoples basic rights, his parents and grandparents and other elders in his community too, were strong in their resistance against the oppressive state policies which governed the lives of Aboriginal people and caused great suffering. His parents in particular were strong guardians and advocates of maintaining their family's Wiradjuri cultural identity, against rampant assimilation practices that were constantly forced upon Aboriginal people throughout the country at the time.

He was the first Aboriginal scholar at Cowra High School to pass the Higher School Certificate and to be elected a prefect, after spending three years at high school on a scholarship provided by a group of women's organisations.

== Career ==
Arrived in Sydney to initially study art and play football in 1968. In the wake of the 1967 referendum he was majorly active in the fight for basic rights and equality treatment for Aboriginal people (which progressed from the Aborigines Advancement League in Victoria), working initially with Pearl Gibbs, Douglas Nicholls, Faith Bandler, Charlie Perkins, Oodgeroo Noonuccal, Bert Groves, Frank Roberts, Bruce McGuinness, Len Watson and John Newfong and various members of the advancement leagues for Aboriginal people in Australia at the time. He was one of the founders in the establishment of the Redfern Black Caucus in the inner Sydney suburb of Redfern with Gary Williams, Billy Craigie, Isabell Coe, Chicka Dixon, Gary Foley, Tony Coorey, Cecil Patten, Bob Maza, Denis Walker, Shirl Smith, Michael Ghillar Anderson, Lyall Munro Jnr, Jenny Munro, Gordon Briscoe, Bert Williams, Sam Watson, Kevin Gilbert and Roberta Sykes to name a few; in the fight for human rights and justice for Aboriginal and Torres Strait Islander people, as well as the fight for Aboriginal land rights.

He became the first Aboriginal person to study law at the University of New South Wales and was a rugby league player at the time for both the university team and the Redfern All Blacks. His decision to pursue law instead of becoming an art teacher was profoundly driven by the severe injustices and disenfranchisement of his people, as well as many deaths at the hands of police, including two of his own uncles in the 1960s. One of his sons Paul Coe Jnr quoted his father as saying, "I gave up painting and sculpting because I realised that you cannot paint social, political and economic change."

In April 1970, he spoke as one of the main speakers, before a gathering organised by the Federal Council for the Advancement of Aborigines and Torres Strait Islanders (FCAATSI) gathering at Sydney Town Hall in protest of the celebrations of the bicentennary of Captain Cook's landing in Botany Bay, reminding the audience that they had to demand their rights as people and not beg for them.

In 1970, he led a group of other activists including Isabell Coe, Gary Williams, Gary Foley, Cecil Patten and Tony Coorey (with support from Hal Wootten, then UNSW's Dean of Law) in establishing the Aboriginal Legal Service, the first free legal assistance service in Australia. He continued to play an important role in this organisation until the late 1990s.

In 1971, during the tour of the all-white South African Springboks rugby team, widespread demonstrations took place across Australia in opposition to apartheid. As a leading member of the Redfern Black Caucus, he participated in the protests and used the occasion to draw attention to racial inequality within Australia. At one rally, he criticised sections of the anti-apartheid movement for opposing racism abroad while failing to address injustices experienced by Aboriginal people at home.

He played a key role in the establishment of the Aboriginal Medical Service in Redfern in 1971 along with Shirl Smith, Gordon Briscoe, Dulcie Flower, Fred Hollows and many others.

He was also involved heavily in the establishment of the Aboriginal Tent Embassy on the lawn outside Australian Federal Parliament House in Canberra in January 1972 with fellow Aboriginal rights activists from Redfern (including the four men who went down to Canberra to set it up initially: Billy Craigie, Michael Ghillar Anderson, Tony Coorey and Bert Williams). He was personally violently attacked by police in Canberra during the forced takedown of the tent embassy in July of that year, bruises on his back from the assault he carried for life; his unconscious body can be seen in the documentary Ningla A-Na (1972).

He also played a founding role in the establishment of the Redfern Aboriginal Children's Services in 1975.

On 2 November 1976, while in England, he and fellow Aboriginal activist Cecil Patten rowed ashore at Dover beneath the White Cliffs and planted the Aboriginal flag in a symbolic act "claiming" Britain for Aboriginal people—an intervention intended to spotlight the double standard of terra nullius and assert continuing Aboriginal sovereignty. In 2022, a plaque designed by his daughter Jasmine Coe was installed on Dover Beach to commemorate the action.

In April 1979, he commenced an unsuccessful action in the High Court of Australia Coe vs The Commonwealth, arguing that rights of Aboriginal people as prior inhabitants of Australia before European colonisation should be recognised. While unsuccessful due to judges fears of risking the status quo of the Australian settler state; it paved the way for the Mabo deicison in May 1992 (albeit on a greatly reduced level of Indigenous land sovereignty rights recognition than Coe had set out to fight for recognition of).

The same year, along with Lyall Munro Jnr and Cecil Patten, he represented the NSW Organisation for Aboriginal Unity, camped outside Parliament House with an Aboriginal bill of rights that they wished to see established by the federal government.

He later advocated internationally, addressing the United Nations Working Group on Indigenous Populations (WGIP) in Geneva in August 1988 as chair of the National Aboriginal and Islander Legal Services Secretariat; his statement formed part of the Indigenous interventions that fed into the WGIP's standard-setting work on what became the Draft Declaration (1993) and, ultimately, the United Nations Declaration on the Rights of Indigenous Peoples adopted on 13 September 2007.

== Family ==
Was father of eight children from his two marriages.

== Disbarment ==
In 1997, following proceedings in the Legal Services Tribunal, Coe's name was removed from the roll of legal practitioners. The Tribunal found that Coe had sworn an affidavit which he knew to be false in a material particular. The affidavit in question was sworn in the course of family law proceedings, to which Coe was a party, and understated his salary by some $80,000.

Coe appealed the decision, but the Supreme Court of New South Wales Court of Appeal upheld the Tribunal's decision.

Both the Tribunal and the Court of Appeal commended Coe's role in advancing the interests of the Aboriginal community; however, the Court considered that Coe was not fit to practise, stating that the Court must be able to trust that barristers appearing before it would act in accordance with the law and would not mislead the Court.

Media reports in 2003 indicated that Coe was subsequently investigated by the Bar Association of NSW for continuing to practise despite being removed from the roll. The outcome of the investigation is unknown.

== Death ==
Coe died in Sydney on 29 July 2025, at the age of 76.
