= Col James (architect) =

Australian architect, educator, and activist (1936–2013)

Colin Leslie James (18 July 1936 – 12 February 2013) was an Australian architect, educator, activist, and mentor. He was known for his commitment to creating good affordable housing for those in need, and his work with the Aboriginal Housing Company in Redfern spanned thirty years. He also taught at the University of Sydney School of Architecture, Design and Planning for many years.

== Early life and education ==
Colin Leslie James was born on 18 July 1936 in the country town Walcha, New South Wales, where his father, Arthur James, was a bank manager. His mother was Estelle (nee Ferguson). He came into contact with many Aboriginal people while training for the sport of boxing.

James attended The King's School in Parramatta. He commenced part-time studies in architecture at Sydney Technical College before transferring to the University of New South Wales. At UNSW he became president of the Architecture Club, and also won a boxing blue. He married Karine Elizabeth Shellshear on February 20, 1988. They had a daughter, Zoë Shellshear James, born April 3, 1988.

Throughout his career he undertook further courses, including the study of landscape architecture and sculpture.

== Career ==
After graduation, he joined Stephenson and Turner, a large practice under Sir Arthur Stephenson and Donald Turner. He was then influenced by reading about the European architectural group Team 10, in particular the Dutch architects Aldo van Eyck and Jacob Bakema, who believed that architects were ignoring ordinary and poor people who lived in bad housing. Thanks to a scholarship from Stephenson and Turner, James went to study at Harvard, where he completed a Masters degree in Design under Dean Joseph Lluis Sert. He then got to work in Bakema's studio in the Netherlands, and later with The Architects Collaborative in Cambridge, Massachusetts under Walter Gropius. He also worked on a community housing project in Boston.

After his return to Australia in the mid-1960s, James worked on schools and retirement homes for the Salvation Army, at Stephenson and Turner.

He lived in Redfern, where in the late 1960s he established a collaborative called Archanon which aimed "to empower communities for social equity and environmental sustainability". In Redfern, a suburb with a large population of Aboriginal people, James worked with Father Ted Kennedy, Mum Shirl, Dick Blair, and Bob Bellear and his wife Kaye on many grassroots community services. These included the Aboriginal Medical Service, Aboriginal Legal Service, and Black Theatre. He also supported and worked with the Aboriginal Housing Company (AHC) on the acquisition and upgrading of properties that made up The Block in Redfern, from 1973. His pro bono work with AHC continued over around 40 years, including during its redevelopment, known as the Pemulwuy Project.

One of Archanon's close collaborators in the 1970s was urban designer, architect, and artist Nick Hollo, when Hollo was a tutor at the University of Sydney School of Architecture. Around 1975–1977 Tone Wheeler, design instigator of the ‘Autonomous House’, worked as a tutor in his final years of study and with Hollo and James, in collaboration with students, designed and built the autonomous house on university grounds, behind its Wentworth Building. This taught self-build sustainability to hundreds of students.

In 1974, James became the resident advocate for the community of Woolloomooloo, commissioned by Minister for Urban and Regional Development Tom Uren, under the Whitlam Government. During that time he supported the Trade Union movement, joined the BLF, and provided technical advice on the Green Bans. Between 1975 and 1981 he was commissioned by the NSW Housing Commission to continue in the role of Resident Advocate following the signing of the tri-partite agreement (between Local, State and Federal Government) for the redevelopment of Woolloomooloo, re-housing the displaced low-income community.

James was involved in a project designing low-cost housing in Nimbin, and, in collaboration with a group of students, published Low Cost Country Home Building, "a self-help book for people wanting to build simple houses in rural areas". James promoted the idea of multiple occupancy (MO) homes, and this guide led to the flourishing of MOs in the Northern Rivers region of NSW.

In late 1975, James bought a derelict warehouse on Shepherd Street in Darlington, just behind the university, intending to create a dwelling with shared occupancy along with friends, staff, and students who signed up for it, operating as a "single family" via a cooperative arrangement. However, regulations did not allow this and a long legal battle ensued in the Supreme Court of New South Wales before they won victory in 1978 and were allowed to convert the building. James lived in the building until shortly before his death. The building is known as the Dempsey Warehouse (having been previously owned by Dempsey & Co.). Architects Marra and Yeh moved into the downstairs studio in 2006 and they discussed possible upgrading of the building with James and his wife, Karine Shellshear. Their shared concept of a roof garden with solar panels was incorporated into the design brief much later, and eventually carried out in 2021. As of 2024 the north-east sub-division of the warehouse comprises three self-contained units with a rooftop garden.

In 1977 he earned a diploma in town and country planning at the University of Sydney, where the course precepts were "serve your client and community equally", and stressed public good in planning. He then joined their staff as a senior lecturer in architecture, in which he remained until his retirement. In the late 1970s, he undertook further study on housing design at the Architectural Association in London.

In 1987, he was seconded by the NSW Department of Housing to oversee the implementation of the Homes on Aboriginal Land program. He also did other work in Redfern, for the Aboriginal Health and Medical Research Council, Boomalli Artists Co-operative, and Bangarra Dance Theatre.

Influenced by the AA, in 1998, James established the Masters Degree in Housing Studies at the University of Sydney in collaboration with the University of NSW and the NSW Department of Housing, supporting students with scholarships. He was also appointed director of the Ian Buchan Fell Housing Research Centre, a research centre at the university.

In 2001, the Byera Hadley Travelling Scholarship enabled James to study the use of vacant buildings by the homeless in the UK and Europe. He then collaborated with developers, the construction industry, and government officials as well as other architects, to create CRASH (Construction Industry Relief and Assistance for the Single Homeless), a charitable research project which aimed to supply homeless people with medium-term shelter in vacant buildings in Sydney City.

He retired in 2009.

== Other activities and activism ==
During the 1970s, James was a board member of South Sydney Community Aid (along with Dick Blair), and he was an early member of the Tenants' Union of NSW and Shelter NSW. He was a member of the Builders Labourers Federation, offering independent advice on the green bans with Jack Mundey and others. He was appointed resident advocate for the redevelopment of Woolloomooloo by the Whitlam government and then after by the NSW Housing Commission.

James served on various state housing committees, which led to programs and services such as the NSW Community Tenancy Scheme, the Local Government Community Housing Program, and projects such as Gamrad Youth Housing, funded under Burdekin, and the Erskineville youth refuge. He helped establish the South West Inner Sydney Housing (SWISH) Co-operative, later to become Bridge Housing, and remained a director for some ten years, auspicing other housing initiatives including housing co-operatives in the south west inner city, such as Gamrad, STUCCO, Alpha House, Planet X, and Emoh Ruo.He also worked with the UTS Community Law and Legal Research Centre to create a model "caretaker lease" for temporary housing. in support of homeless students and other groups such as the Broadway squatters.

In later life, James did a feasibility study for a College of the Spirit for the Tharawal Local Aboriginal Land Council, involving 20 architecture students and 1000 Land Council members.

In Sydney, he worked on saving and re-cycling the fig trees in Victoria Park, some of which became Aboriginal totems in Victoria Park and he established a collaborative planning proposal for the park with students from both Sydney University School of Architecture and Eora Aboriginal Technical College. The proposal included the upgrade of the Gardener’s Lodge, proposed for Aboriginal employment and seating for elders around play areas for children.

== Recognition and honours ==
- 1994: Member of the Order of Australia (AM), in the 1994 Australia Day Honours, "for service to architecture and to the community"
- 2003: NSW Royal Australian Institute of Architects President's Medal
- 2006: University of Sydney Alumni Award for Community Service
- 2009: Lifetime Achievement Award, as well as inaugural recipient of Lifetime Membership of the Australasian Housing Institute, presented by NSW Governor Marie Bashir

He was also made life fellow of the Australian Institute of Architects and life member of NSW Shelter.

Lee Stickells wrote in a footnote to a 2017 article about the development of the autonomous house: "Although it is beyond the scope of this paper, Col James' career is deserving of extended consideration", and provides further references to his work.

== Death and legacy ==
James died on 12 February 2013, and was survived by his partner, Karine Shellshear, and their daughter, Zoë Shellshear James.

Upon his death, Lord Mayor of Sydney Clover Moore paid tribute to him at Sydney council, and proposed that members stand for one minute's silence in honour of Moore.

In 2015, the University of Sydney School of Architecture, Design and Planning established the Centenary Scholarship – Col James Award for Social Justice, to be awarded to a student who aspires to "walk in his footsteps and use architecture to promote environmental and social justice".

The Col James Student Accommodation, completed in 2021 as part of the Pemulwuy Project that has revitalised The Block, was named in honour of James.
