= Redfern Aboriginal Tent Embassy =

Coordinates: 33.8908804°S 151.1988926°E

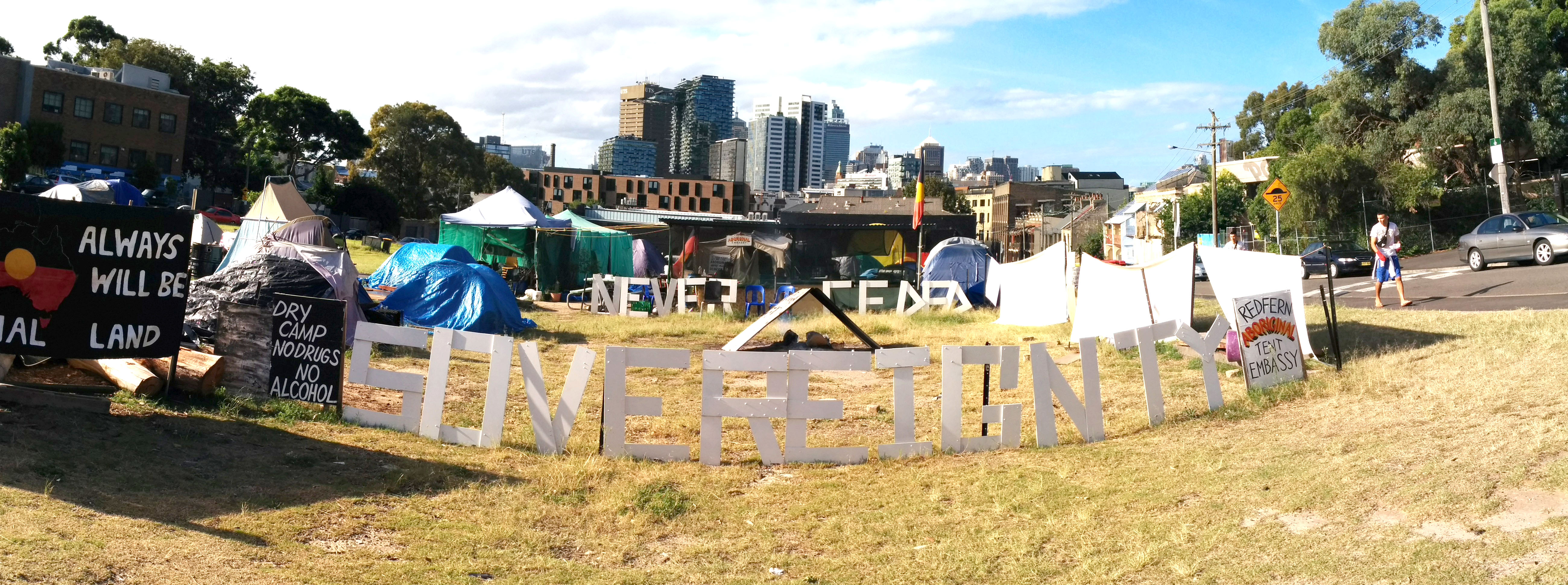
The Redfern Aboriginal Tent Embassy in March 2016

The Redfern Aboriginal Tent Embassy was a protest camp run by Aboriginal Australians in the inner-Sydney suburb of Redfern. Its aim was to keep an area of land known as The Block in Aboriginal hands, and to ensure the land was used solely for low-cost housing for Aboriginal people. It was started by Aboriginal elder, Jenny Munro, and was named after the original Aboriginal Tent Embassy in Canberra.

The organisers of the Redfern Aboriginal Tent Embassy said they were defying the gentrification of Redfern, and described the eviction of the Aboriginal people from the area as "social cleansing".

== History ==
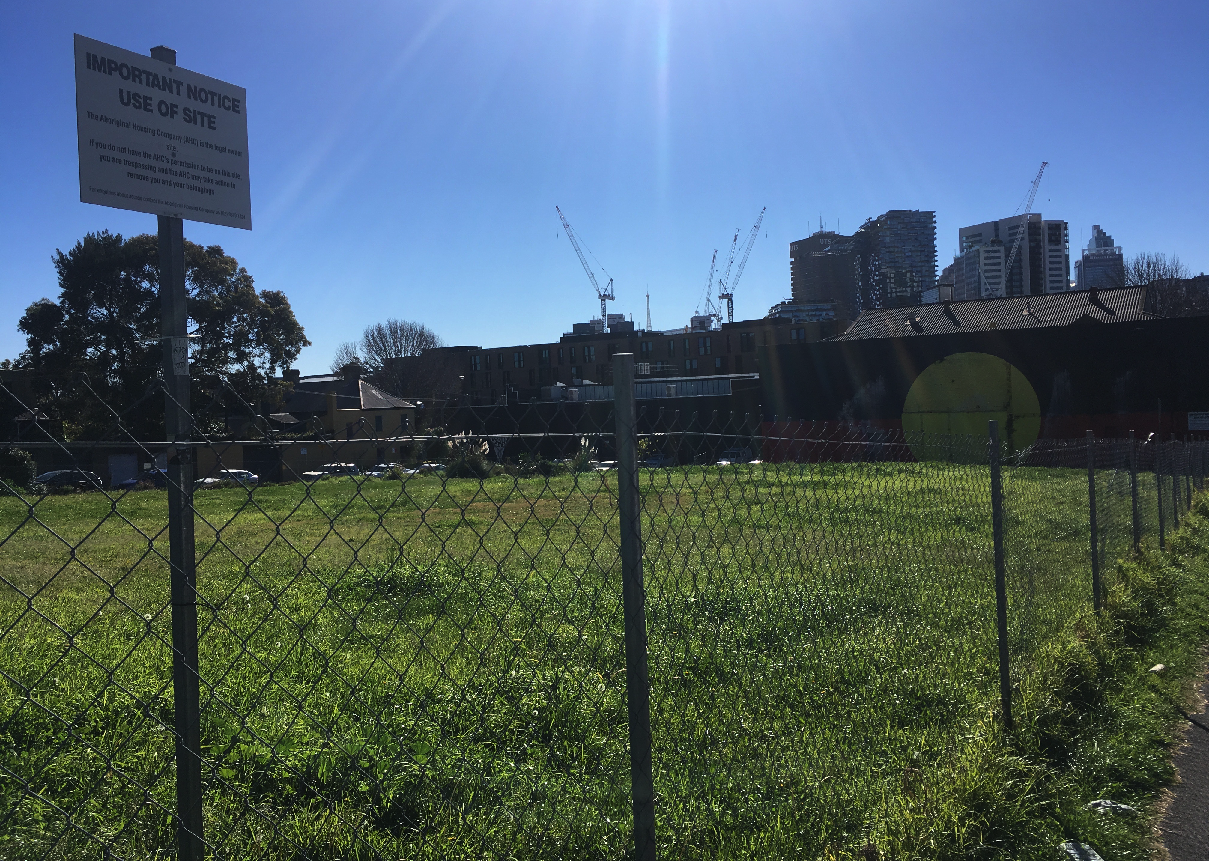
The site of the Redfern Aboriginal Tent Embassy, pictured in July 2017

The Redfern Aboriginal Tent Embassy was established on National Sorry Day on 26 May 2014, when Jenny Munro, her husband Lyall Munro Jnr, and other Aboriginal elders erected numerous tents on the otherwise vacant land. There were formerly houses on The Block, which were purchased with a grant from the Whitlam government in 1972, as a result of a campaign led by Bob Bellear to secure low-cost housing for Aboriginal people. This was because Aboriginal people were subjected to severe discrimination when seeking accommodation in the private rental market. Purchase of houses continued over time.

The Aboriginal Housing Company (AHC), an Aboriginal charity, was set up to administer and oversee the provision of low-cost housing for Aboriginal people. Over the years, there were complaints that the AHC was not transparent about its financial affairs, and it was accused of nepotism and mismanagement. As median house prices in Redfern doubled in the late 1990s, the AHC began evicting Aboriginal tenants from The Block, and moving them to other AHC-owned houses further away from Sydney's centre. The AHC then demolished the vacated houses on The Block.

Munro said The Block is sacred, sovereign Aboriginal land. But on 26 May 2014, the CEO of the Aboriginal Housing Company, Michael Mundine, said that The Block was private land. However, he told reporters that he would not instruct the police to remove the tent embassy inhabitants from the site.

Mundine announced plans to use the land across the road from The Block for a $70 million commercial development, including retail outlets, a gymnasium, and housing for 154 non-Aboriginal students from the nearby University of Sydney. He said he still intends to put Aboriginal housing on The Block, but there is no funding to make it happen. People are concerned that the plans have changed, but as there is little information available, calls for greater transparency have been renewed. Mundine caused outrage by teaming with developer Deicorp, a company whose agents had advertised its new luxury apartments in the area by stating:

"The Aboriginals have already moved out, now Redfern is the last virgin suburb close to city, it will have great potential for the capital growth in the near future."

On 21 February 2015, Mundine's AHC issued eviction notices to the tent embassy inhabitants, telling them they were on private land and that he would get the authorities to remove them. The Aboriginal people at the tent embassy vowed to stay. In August 2015 the protesters at the tent embassy lost a Supreme Court case asking for a possession order for the land. The court instead ruled that the land was the property of the AHC. The protesters previously stated they would not vacate until the AHC prioritised affordable housing for Aboriginal people at the location. The Tent Embassy claimed victory later that month, when the federal government agreed to spend $70 million on 62 homes for Aboriginal people. The embassy has since been closed and as of July 2017, the site remains fenced off and undeveloped.

The Aboriginal activist Ray Jackson was a prominent campaigner for the Redfern Aboriginal Tent Embassy, and was a familiar sight there up until his death in April 2015.
