= Tiddas =

Tiddas may refer to:

- Tiddas (band), Australian female folk band trio
  - Tiddas (album), 1996 album by the band
- Tiddas, Morocco, a rural commune in Morocco
- Tiddas (novel), 2014 novel by Dr Anita Heiss
- Plural of Tidda, Northern Koori usage (Australian Aboriginal pidgin) meaning "sister"
