= Jenny Munro =

Aboriginal Australian activist

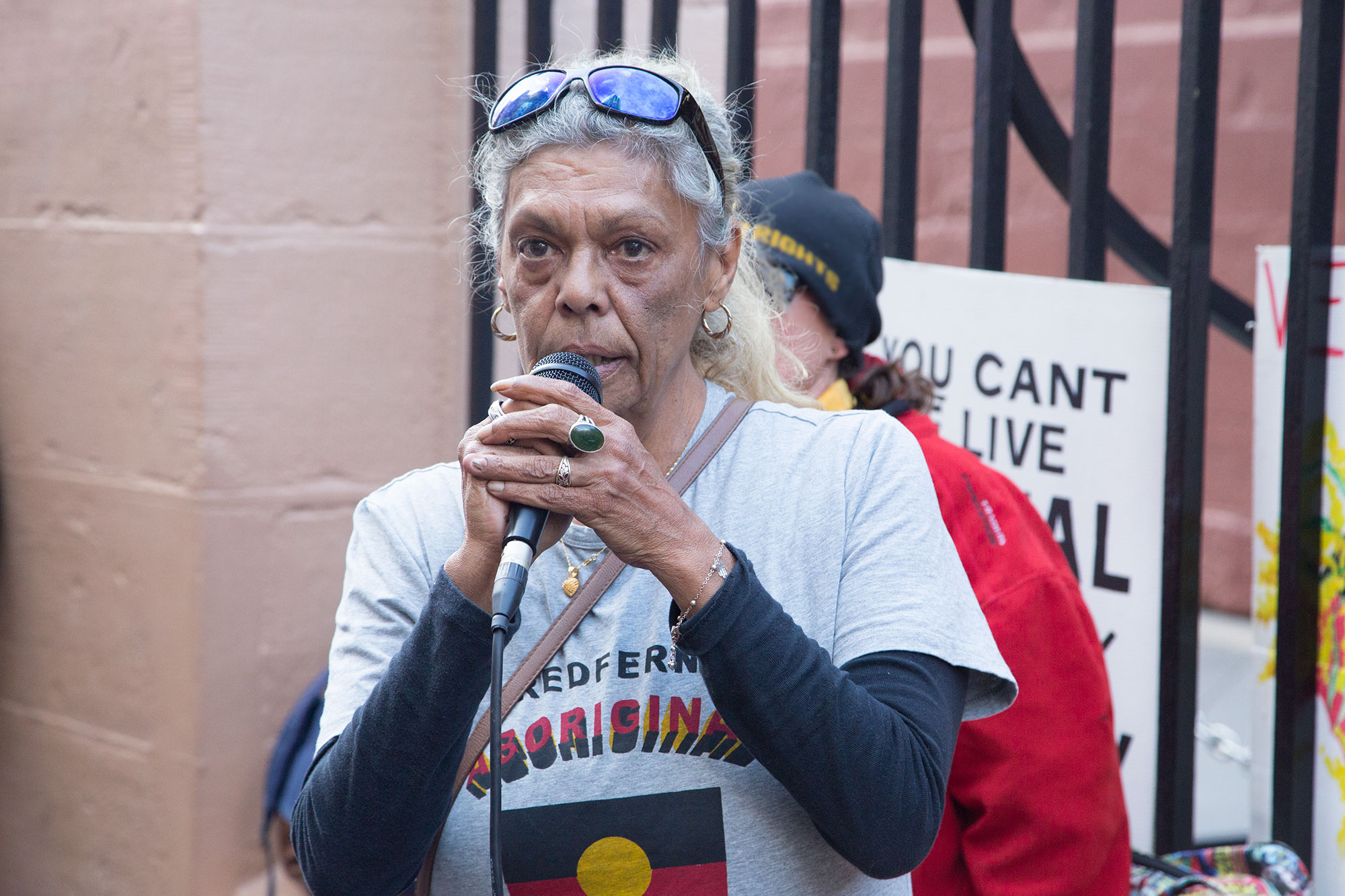
- Jenny Munro speaking at a demonstration outside State Parliament House, New South Wales
- Born: Jenny Coe
- Parents: Les Coe (father); Agnes Coe (mother)
- Relatives: Isabell Coe (sister); Paul Coe (brother)

Jenny Munro (née Coe) is an Australian Wiradjuri elder and a prominent activist for the rights of Indigenous Australians. She has been at the forefront of the fight for Aboriginal housing at The Block in Sydney and started the Redfern Aboriginal Tent Embassy. She is the sister of activists Isabell Coe and Paul Coe.

She is an active member of the Waterloo Public Housing Action Group.

== Early life ==
Munro was born to parents Les and Agnes Coe, (Note: Birth name per Australian Museum entry for Lyall Jnr.) who were Aboriginal land rights activists. She is the younger sister of activist Isabell Coe and her brother Paul Coe, and had another sister and brother.

She grew up on Erambie Mission, near the town of Cowra, New South Wales. In 1972, Munro's parents took her to the Aboriginal Tent Embassy in Canberra, where they joined the protest by sleeping in tents. At the age of 17, she moved to the inner-Sydney suburb of Redfern. In 1972 in Sydney, she met her husband, Lyall Munro Jnr, and they both became founding members of the Aboriginal Housing Company (AHC). Together, she and Lyall moved to an AHC-run house in the Sydney suburb of Marrickville, where they raised two children. She successfully completed an arts / law degree at the University of New South Wales.

In 1978, Munro began work as a trainee bookkeeper at the Aboriginal Children's Services in Sydney, eventually becoming Administrator of the organisation. She was elected chairperson of the Secretariat of National Aboriginal and Islander Child Care (SNAICC), and was involved in campaigns to convince the New South Wales government to change its approach to Aboriginal issues. In the 1998 Australian federal election, she stood as an independent in the electoral Division of Sydney.

== Redfern Aboriginal Tent Embassy ==
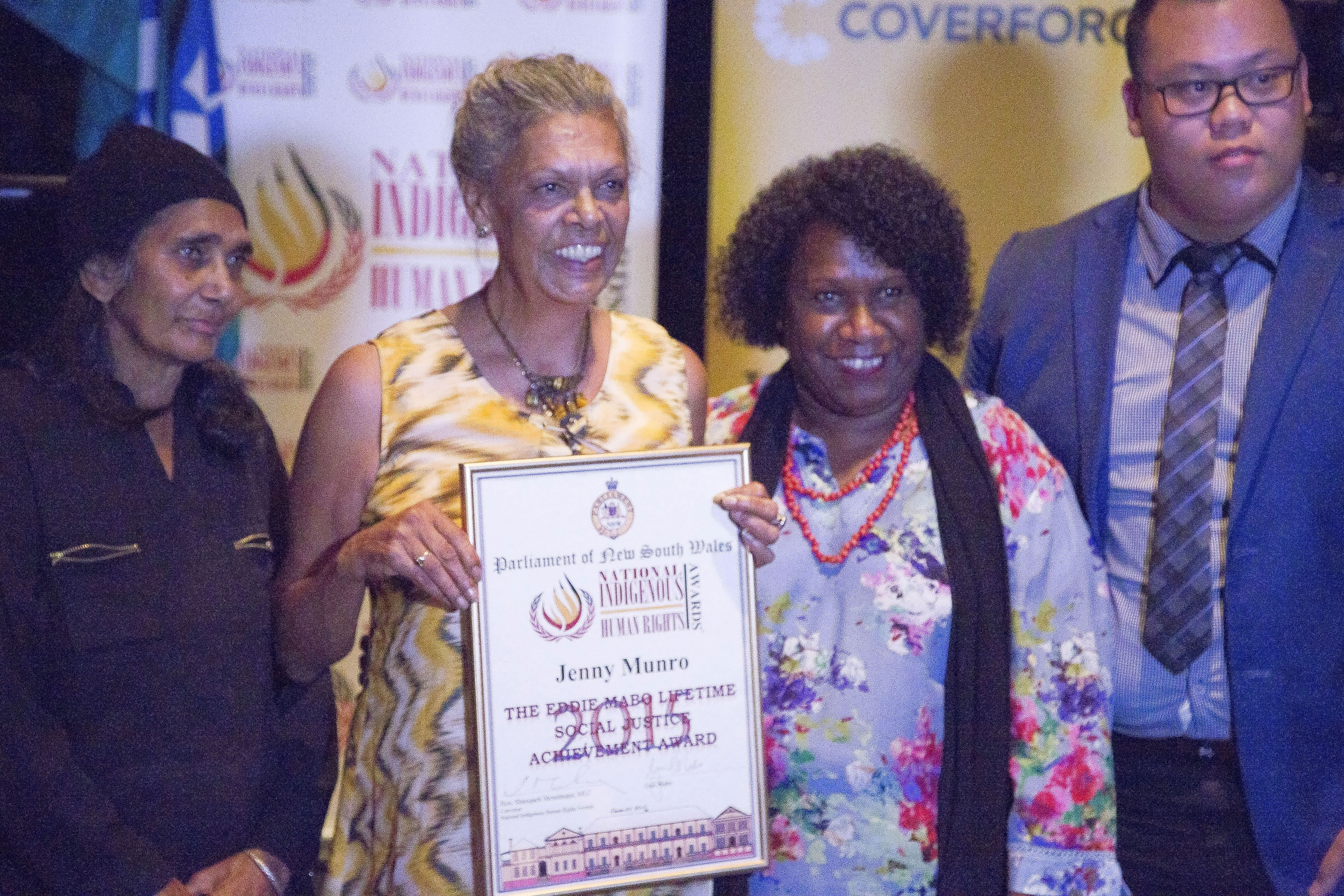
Jenny Munro accepts award at the National Indigenous Human Rights Awards

On 26 May 2014 Munro launched Redfern Aboriginal Tent Embassy to reclaim affordable Aboriginal housing for the former residents of the area known as The Block, despite a stand-off with the Aboriginal Housing Company, which had evicted all the former Aboriginal tenants continuing to occupy The Block. In February 2015 Aboriginal Housing Company chairman Mick Mundine threatened to commence the eviction of the protesters led by Munro. In Sydney's major newspaper, Daisy Dumas reported that the standoff between the protestors and the Housing Company intensified in 2015 with the matter before the Supreme Court for judgment and with the State Attorney General alerted.

After more than 400 days of the Redfern Aboriginal Tent Embassy, Munro declared victory when the Federal Minister for Indigenous Affairs, Nigel Scullion intervened on the Embassy's behalf and brokered a peaceful resolution between the Housing Company and the Embassy. Scullion committed $5 million of federal funds to the site for 62 affordable Aboriginal housing units.

== Honours ==
- National Indigenous Human Rights Awards - 2015 Eddie Mabo Award for Social Justice
