= Anita Heiss =

Indigenous Australian author

Dr. Anita Heiss AM
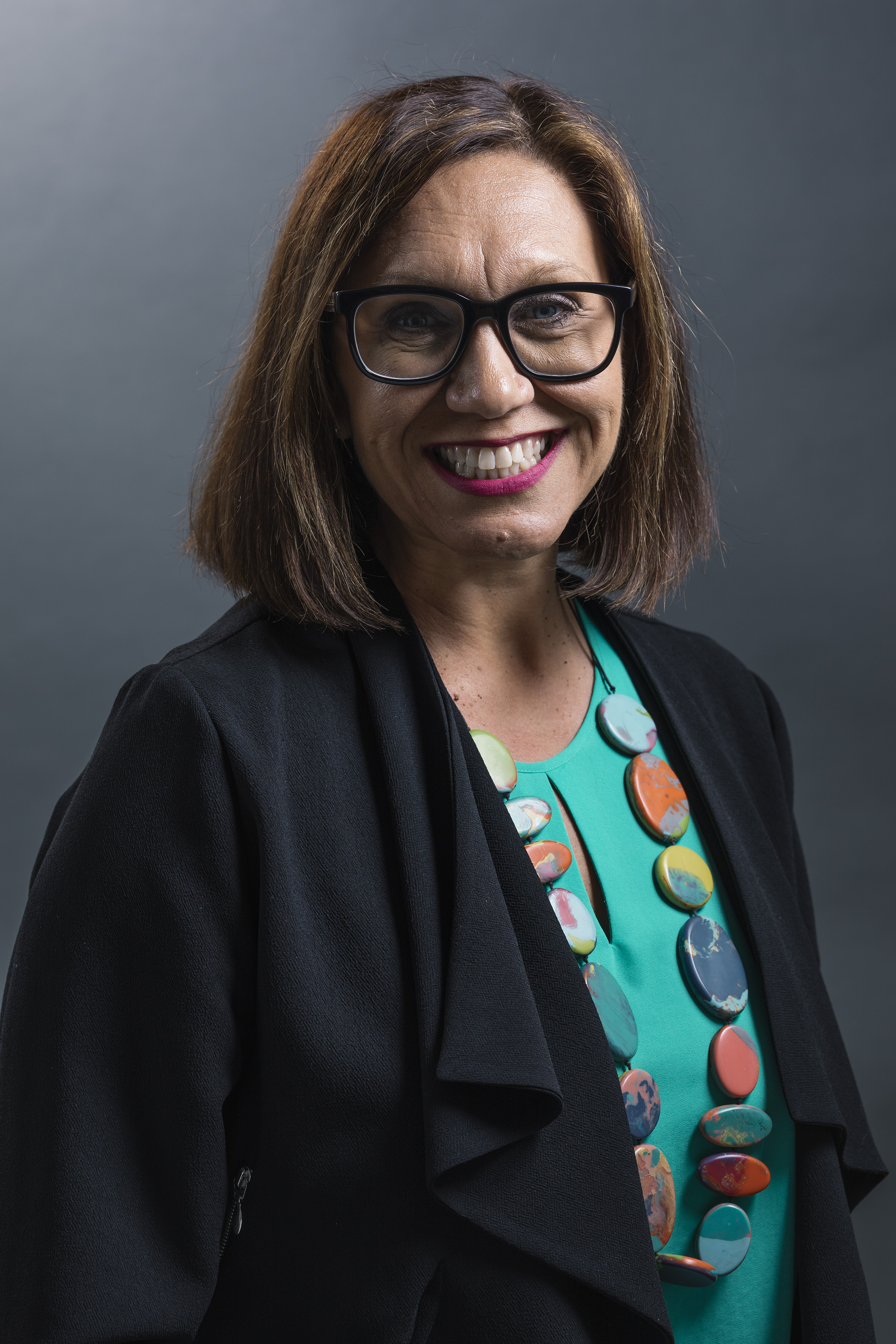
- Heiss in 2017
- Born: Anita Marianne Heiss; 1968 (age 57–58); Sydney, New South Wales, Australia
- Education: University of New South Wales, Western Sydney University
- Occupations: Author, presenter, commentator
- Years active: 2000–present
- Anita Heiss's voice In Wiradjuri and English. Recorded 4 December 2018

Anita Marianne Heiss AM (born 1968) is an Aboriginal Australian author, poet, cultural activist and social commentator. She is an advocate for Indigenous Australian literature and literacy, through her writing for adults and children and her membership of boards and committees.

== Early life and education ==
Heiss was born in Sydney in 1968, and is a member of the Wiradjuri nation of central New South Wales. Her mother, Elsie Williams, was born at Erambie Mission, Cowra in Wiradjuri country, while her father, Josef Heiss, was born in St Michael in the Lungau, Salzburg, Austria.

Heiss was educated at St Clare's College, Waverley, then at the University of New South Wales, where she earned her Bachelor of Arts degree in 1989. After a cadetship at the Australian International Development Assistance Bureau (later AusAID) in Canberra, she returned to UNSW to complete an honours degree in History in 1991. She gained her PhD in Communication and Media at the University of Western Sydney in 2000, becoming the first Aboriginal student at the university to achieve this, which she considers her proudest achievement. While working on her doctorate, Heiss ran writing workshops in regional New South Wales, and also travelled to Canada and New Zealand to do research there, giving several guest lectures while abroad.

== Academic and writing career ==
Heiss is known as an author, poet, cultural activist and social commentator. Her work spans non-fiction, historical fiction, commercial women's fiction, poetry, social commentary and travel articles.

After attaining her doctorate, Heiss taught an Introduction to Indigenous Australia course at the University of Western Sydney, but became disillusioned with academia and resigned her position after a year or two, although retaining her unpaid role as an adjunct associate professor at the Badanami Centre for Indigenous Education at the university, a position she continued until at least 2011.

Heiss was a consultant researcher and writer for the Barani Aboriginal history website, first published by the City of Sydney in 2001.

In 2004 she was writer in residence at Macquarie University, Sydney, a part-time position, at the same time working from home on her writing.

She was Deputy-Director at Warawara Department of Indigenous Studies at Macquarie University from 2005 to 2006.

She was Adjunct Professor at the Jumbunna Indigenous House of Learning (now Jumbunna Institute for Indigenous Education and Research) at the University of Technology, Sydney, from 2012 to at least 2014.

=== Present ===
Appointed in 2021, Heiss was Professor of Communications at the Aboriginal and Torres Strait Islander Studies Unit, University of Queensland but resigned in May 2026 following the university's decision to pulp Bila by Jazz Money.

== Other roles and activities ==
In 1993, Heiss, along with writers Jared Thomas and Kerry Reed-Gilbert (the latter also a good friend), participated in a writers' workshop at which they discussed the germ of an idea which would become the First Nations Australia Writers Network.

From 1998 until 2004, and again from 2007, she was on the management committee of the Australian Society of Authors (ASA).

From 2001 until 2003 she was Communications Adviser for the Aboriginal and Torres Strait Islander Arts Board of the Australia Council for the Arts.

Heiss was chair of Gadigal/Koori Radio until September 2008.

She was a witness in Eatock v Bolt, a 2011 decision of the Federal Court of Australia which held that two articles written by columnist and commentator Andrew Bolt and published in The Herald Sun newspaper had contravened section 18C, of the Racial Discrimination Act 1975. Bolt had accused Heiss and other Aboriginal people of "choosing" their identity for personal benefit.

In 2011 Heiss was a board member for the National Aboriginal Sporting Chance Academy, and an ambassador for Indigenous Literacy Day and for the Books in Homes program. She has been an advocate for the National Centre of Indigenous Excellence, a social enterprise in Sydney. In 2015 Heiss became an ambassador for the Worawa Aboriginal College.

Heiss was appointed to the State Library of Queensland board in 2017. She is not on the board, but a member of the Indigenous Advisory Group, an independent advisory group to the Library Board.

Heiss is Ambassador of the GO Foundation (founded by Adam Goodes, Michael O'Loughlin and James Gallichan); and the Sydney Swans Australian rules football club.

She also runs her own communications business, Curringa Communications.

In 2023, Heiss launched Bundyi, a First Nations imprint with Simon & Schuster. The imprint, named after a Wiradjuri word meaning “to share with me”, focuses on publishing works by First Nations authors, with titles written, edited and designed by First Nations creatives. In her role as Publisher-at-Large, Heiss commissions both fiction and non-fiction titles.

== Awards, fellowships and grants ==
- 1994/1996/2011 – Writer's Grants from the Australia Council for the Arts
- June 1997 – ANZAC Fellowship (NZ Department of External Affairs) to New Zealand to meet Māori authors and publishers
- 2002 – Winner: NSW Premier's History Award (Audio Visual) for the website Barani: The Aboriginal History of the City of Sydney
- 2002 – Shortlist: NSW Premier's History Award (Young People's History) for Who Am I? The diary of Mary Talence, Sydney 1937
- 2003 – Winner: inaugural Australian Society of Authors Medal for contribution to Australian community and life
- 2004 – NSW Indigenous Arts Fellowship
- 2004 – Nominee: Deadly Award for Most Outstanding Contribution to Literature
- 2007 – Winner: Deadly Award for Most Outstanding Contribution to Literature for Not Meeting Mr Right.
- 2008 – Winner: Deadly Award for Most Outstanding Contribution to Literature, with Peter Minter, for the Macquarie PEN Anthology of Aboriginal Literature
- 2010 – Winner: Deadly Award for Most Outstanding Contribution to Literature for Manhattan Dreaming
- 2011 – Winner: Deadly Award for Most Outstanding Contribution to Literature for Paris Dreaming
- 2012 – Finalist: Human Rights Awards, Media, for Am I Black Enough for You?
- 2012 – Winner: Victorian Premier's Literary Award for Indigenous Writing for Am I Black Enough for You?
- 2022 – Winner: New South Wales Premier's Literary Awards Indigenous Writers' Prize for Bila Yarrudhanggalangdhuray
- 2022 – Member of the Order of Australia

== Selected works ==
=== Non-fiction ===
- Am I Black Enough For You? (Random House, 2012) ISBN 9781742751924
- Macquarie PEN Anthology of Aboriginal Literature edited Anita Heiss and Peter Minter (Allen & Unwin Sydney 2008) ISBN 978 1 74175 438 4
- Dhuuluu-yala, To Talk Straight: Publishing indigenous literature (Aboriginal Studies Press, 2003) ISBN 0-85575-444-3

=== Novels ===
- Dirrayawadha: Rise Up, (2024), Simon & Schuster Australia, ISBN 9781761105272
- Bila Yarrudhanggalangdhuray: River of Dreams, (2021), Simon & Schuster Australia, ISBN 9781760850449
- Barbed Wire and Cherry Blossoms, (2016), Simon & Schuster Australia, ISBN 9781925184846
- Tiddas (Simon & Schuster, Australia 2014) ISBN 978 1 92205 2285
- Paris Dreaming (Bantam, Australia 2011) ISBN 9781741668933
- Manhattan Dreaming (Bantam, Australia 2010) ISBN 978 1 86471 1288
- Avoiding Mr Right (Bantam, Australia 2008) ISBN 9781863256049
- Not Meeting Mr. Right (Bantam, Australia 2007) ISBN 978-1-86325-511-0

=== Children's literature ===
- Who am I? The diary of Mary Talence, Sydney 1937 (Scholastic, Australia 2001) ISBN 1-86504-361-3
- Yirra and her deadly dog, Demon (ABC Books, 2007) ISBN 978-0-7333-2039-2
- Demon Guards the School Yard (OUP / Laguna Bay, Australia 2011) ISBN 9780195572568
- My Australian Story: Our Race for Reconciliation (Scholastic, Australia 2017) ISBN 9781760276119
- Koori Princess (Magabala Books 2022) ISBN 9781922613158

=== Poetry ===
- Token Koori (Curringa Communications, 1998) ISBN 0-646-35290-3
- I'm Not Racist, But ... (Salt, 2007) ISBN 978-1-84471-316-5

=== Humour ===
- Sacred cows (Magabala, 1996) ISBN 1-875641-25-4

=== As editor ===
- Growing up Wiradjuri (Magabala Books, 2022) ISBN 1922613746
- Growing Up Aboriginal In Australia (Black Inc, 2018) ISBN 9781863959810
- Life in Gadigal Country (Gadigal Information Service, 2002) ISBN 0 9580923 0 3
- Stories without End (Halstead Press, Australia, 2002) ISBN 1875684956
