= Ray Jackson (Aboriginal activist) =

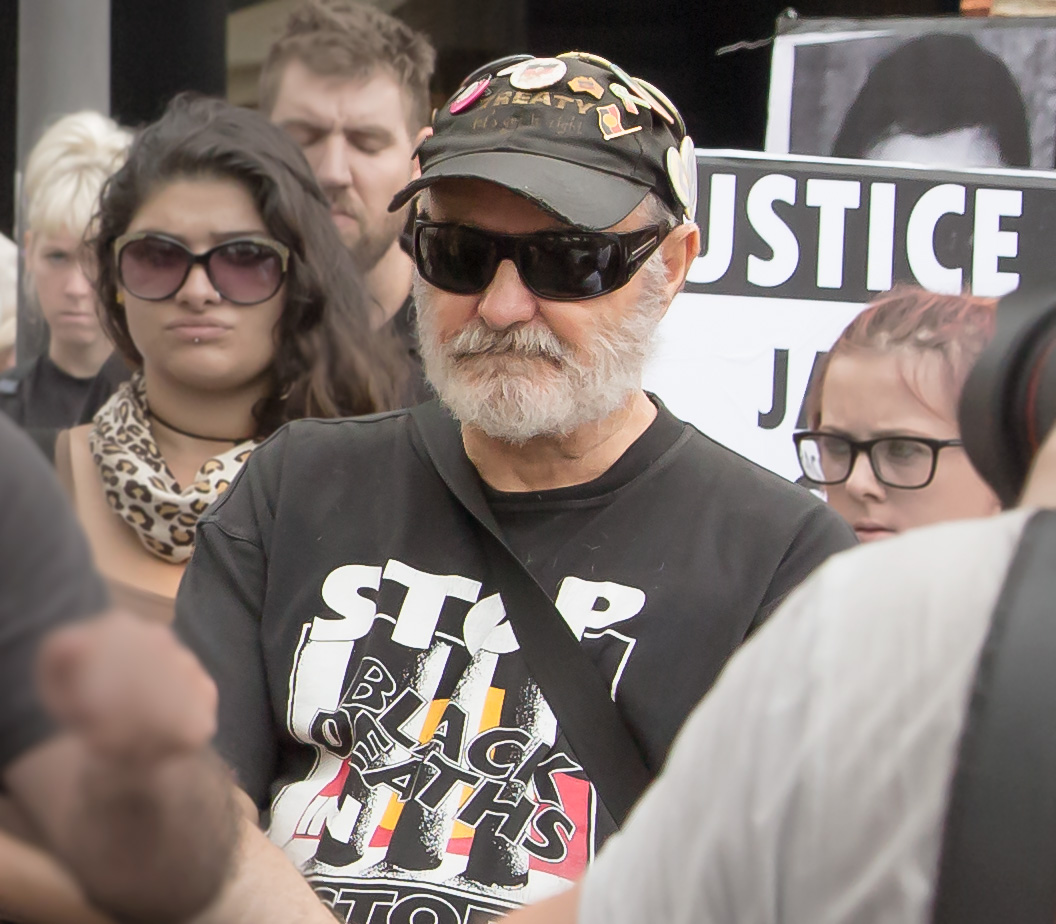
- Ray Jackson at a 2014 rally for Aboriginal boy, TJ Hickey
- Born: 27 March 1941
- Died: 23 April 2015 (aged 74); Sydney
- Other name: Uncle Ray
- Known for: Activism

Ray Jackson (27 March 1941 – 23 April 2015) was an Australian Aboriginal activist and Wiradjuri elder. He was President of the Indigenous Social Justice Association (ISJA), and a prominent campaigner for the rights of Indigenous Australians.

== Early life ==
Ray Jackson was a member of the Stolen Generations. In 1943, when Jackson was two years old, his father was killed in World War II, fighting Japanese forces on the Kokoda Track. Jackson said that instead of his biological mother receiving a war widows pension, the Australian government removed her four children (including Jackson) from her custody due to her Aboriginality.

His name was changed and he was sent to a Catholic institution for a year, before being adopted by a white family. It was not until his teen years that he discovered he had been adopted. He never found his biological family, and never learned the original name they had given him.

== Activism ==
Jackson was one of Australia's most prominent and knowledgeable campaigners on the issue of Aboriginal deaths in custody. He campaigned for justice for the families of victims, Eddie Murray, Mark Mason and TJ Hickey.

Between 1991 and 1997, Jackson was coordinator of the Aboriginal Deaths in Custody Watch Committee, which was financed by the government agency, ATSIC. In an interview published by Green Left Weekly, Jackson said:

"We were so well set we had a hotline any blackfella could call, anytime. If a copper so much as verballed a black kid, we'd get a call and be out at the police station, no matter where it was — at the latest — a day later, interrogating them."

However, when the government led by Prime Minister John Howard cut all funding to the committee, Jackson established the Indigenous Social Justice Association (ISJA) to continue the work.

Jackson's small Waterloo apartment was full of shelves and folders containing meticulous records about Aboriginal deaths in custody. He would attend the scenes where people had died at the hands of police, and represent the deceased's families when dealing with the police and authorities.

In December 2013, the French government agency Commission nationale consultative des droits de l'homme awarded Jackson's Indigenous Social Justice Association a prize of 70,000 euros (US$95,100) in recognition of its contribution to human rights.

Jackson was responsible for hundreds of rallies and actions, especially in remembrance of lost lives to injustices. Jackson confronted police annually in enabling the TJ Hickey January marches from Redfern where he died to NSW Parliament in the heart of the City of the Sydney.

Jackson was often a speaker at protest rallies for Aboriginal rights. Affectionately known as Uncle Ray, he would always attend the rallies wearing in his trademark black cap, decorated with social justice pins. He was a prominent supporter of the Redfern Aboriginal Tent Embassy, and was a familiar sight there up until his death.

== Death ==
In the months before his death, Ray Jackson had not been feeling well, and a week before his death he was hospitalised with pneumonia. Shortly after attending a meeting of the Indigenous Social Justice Association, he died peacefully in his sleep on 23 April 2015. His granddaughter found him in bed that day in his Waterloo flat. At Jackson's request, his body was donated to the University of Sydney.
