= Elsie Heiss =

Australian indigenous elder and Catholic religious leader

- Born: Wiradjuri country near Cowra, New South Wales, Australia
- Other name: Aunty Elsie
- Occupation: Catholic religious leader
- Known for: Work with Catholic Aboriginal Ministries
- Awards: Female Elder of the Year, National NAIDOC Awards, 2009

Elsie Heiss, also known as Aunty Elsie, is an Indigenous Australian, a Wiradjuri elder and a Catholic religious leader. She has led Aboriginal Catholic Ministry programs for over three decades and was NAIDOC Female Elder of the Year in 2009.

== Early life and education ==
Elsie Heiss (née Williams) was born at Erambie Mission in Cowra, New South Wales. Her people, including her father James and her mother Amy, are of the Wiradjuri nation. Heiss spent most of her childhood on Wiradjuri country particularly around Griffith and Cowra in central New South Wales. Her upbringing was shaped by her aboriginal heritage, history and identity, as well as by the Catholic Church, which has been a continual influence throughout her life.

In her late teens, Heiss moved to Sydney, where she met and later married her husband Josef (Joe) Heiss.

After deciding to further her education, Heiss completed a full-time TAFE course in 1989, achieving the highest marks for that year.

== Career ==
Heiss has worked for justice for Aboriginal people for many years, trying particularly to bring about recognition, respect and action from the Catholic Church. She has sought a stronger commitment from the Catholic Church in its support of Aboriginal people, especially by its acceptance of indigenous cultures and practices. She believes that the deep spiritual beliefs of Aboriginal people have much to bring to the Catholic Church.

Heiss''s passion is educating the wider Australian community in understanding Aboriginal people, culture and history. Her knowledge and experience has seen her appointed to many boards and committees including the National Aboriginal and Torres Strait Ecumenical Council of NSW and Catholic Earth Care Australia.

Heiss has built bridges between Aboriginal and non-Aboriginal communities at hundreds of events, speaking on topics as Aboriginal spirituality, the Stolen Generations, Reconciliation and justice.

Heiss has represented New South Wales on the National Aboriginal & Torres Strait Islander Catholic Council (NATSICC) since 1999. Her involvement in the Aboriginal Catholic Ministry (ACM) movement in New South Wales has spanned several decades, initially in Erskineville and later in La Perouse in Sydney. Here she helped establish a centre and the Church of Reconciliation where Aboriginal culture and practice can be celebrated within the context of the Catholic faith.

Heiss' status in community has been recognised both in Australia and internationally. In 1995, she participated in the official smoking ceremony for Pope John Paul II. In 1998 she was the only Aboriginal representative at the Synod of Oceania in Rome.

As Chair of the National Aboriginal and Torres Strait Islander Catholic Council, Heiss played a major role in representing the Aboriginal community during World Youth Day 2008. She welcomed Pope Benedict XVI into Sydney as part of the celebrations, spoke to him in German, and introduced an Indigenous message stick that accompanied the cross on a journey around the country.

== Personal life ==
Heiss was married to Joe for 45 years before he died in 2005. She is a mother of five and grandmother of six. One of her daughters is Aboriginal Australian author Anita Heiss.

== Honours ==
In 2003 Heiss was awarded the NAIDOC community award for her work in health and church in the community. She was awarded Female Elder of the Year by the National NAIDOC Awards in 2009.

In 2010 Heiss was awarded an honorary Doctor of Arts from the University of Notre Dame, Sydney. The university established the Aunty Elsie Indigenous Support Scholarship in 2020 in her honour.

A plaque erected at the Reconciliation Church in December 2013 acknowledges Heiss's contribution as founding member of the Aboriginal Catholic Ministry.

Heiss was also made a Dame Commander of the Order of St Gregory the Great in 2018 for her efforts in promoting an appreciation of Christian spirituality within an Aboriginal context.

== Select publications ==
- Heiss, Elsie. Keep Rekindling that Koori Flame (2003) In: Steppin' Out and Speakin' up. Millers Point, N.S.W: Older Women's Network NSW. pp. 211–222.
- Heiss, Elsie (1999), The Synod for Oceania 2 : an Aborigine at the Synod
