= The Block (Sydney) =

Social housing in Redfern, Sydney

Coordinates: 33.890°S 151.199°E

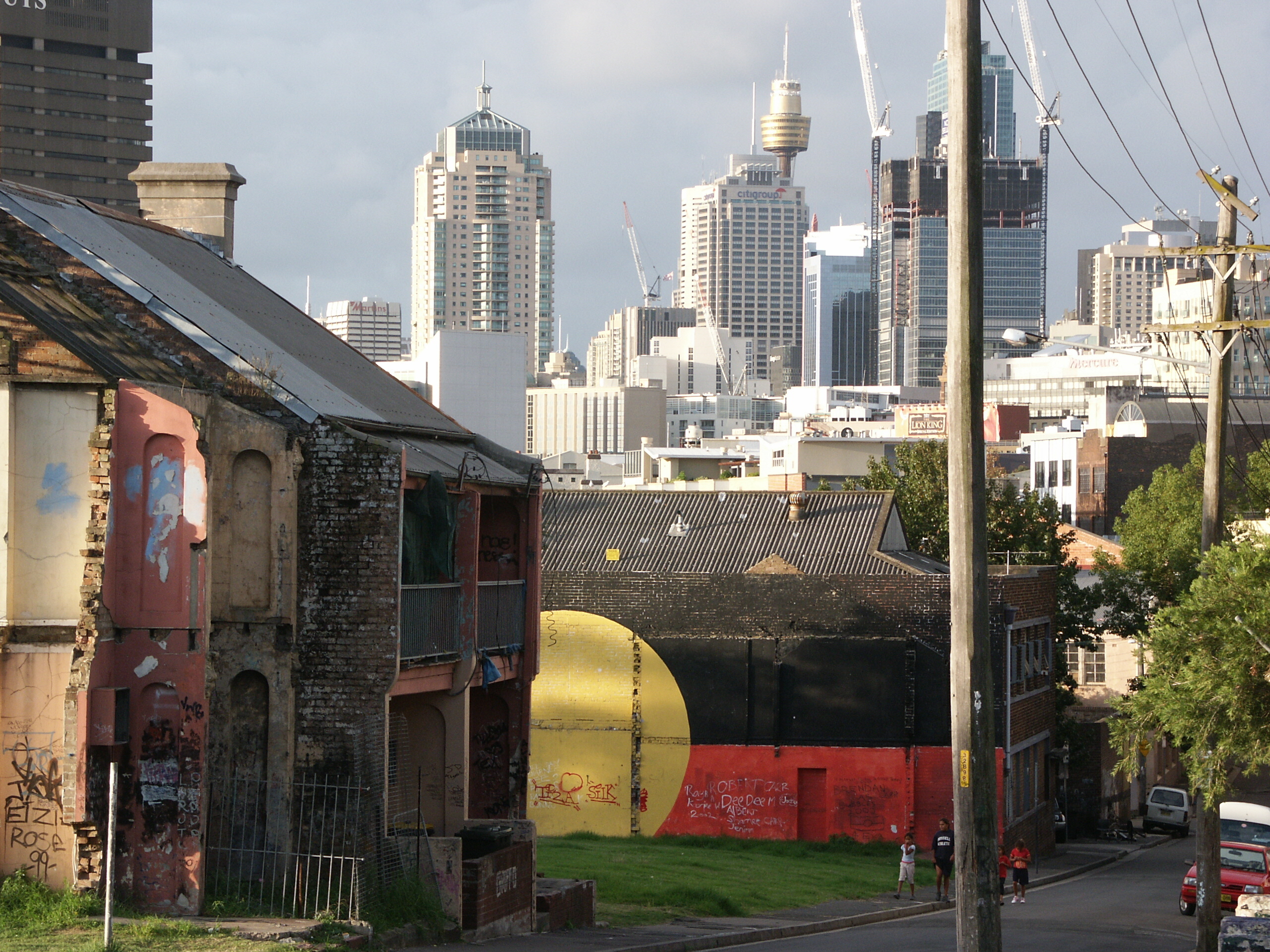
Eveleigh Street, showing Aboriginal flag mural, vacant lot, and derelict terraces c.2003

The Block is a colloquial name given to a residential block of social housing in the suburb of Redfern, Sydney. It is bound by Eveleigh, Caroline, Louis, and Vine Streets. Beginning in 1973, houses on this block were purchased over a period of 30 years by the Aboriginal Housing Company (AHC; originally Aboriginal Housing Committee) for use as a project in Aboriginal-managed housing.

The Block has been progressively demolished and redeveloped since around 2010, as part of the Pemulwuy Project, which was completed in mid-2023. It is now a mixed-use area with student accommodation in the Col James Student Accommodation building, as well as a gymnasium, Indigenous art gallery, and underground car parking. Murals have been refreshed along the railway wall.

== Location ==
The Block is located on the western border of Redfern, on the edge of Darlington. Eveleigh Street is its eastern border, with railway lines on the other side of that street, and The Block used to be referred to as Eveleigh Street. Many Aboriginal men living in the area used to work at the Eveleigh St Railyards The Block is near Redfern station.

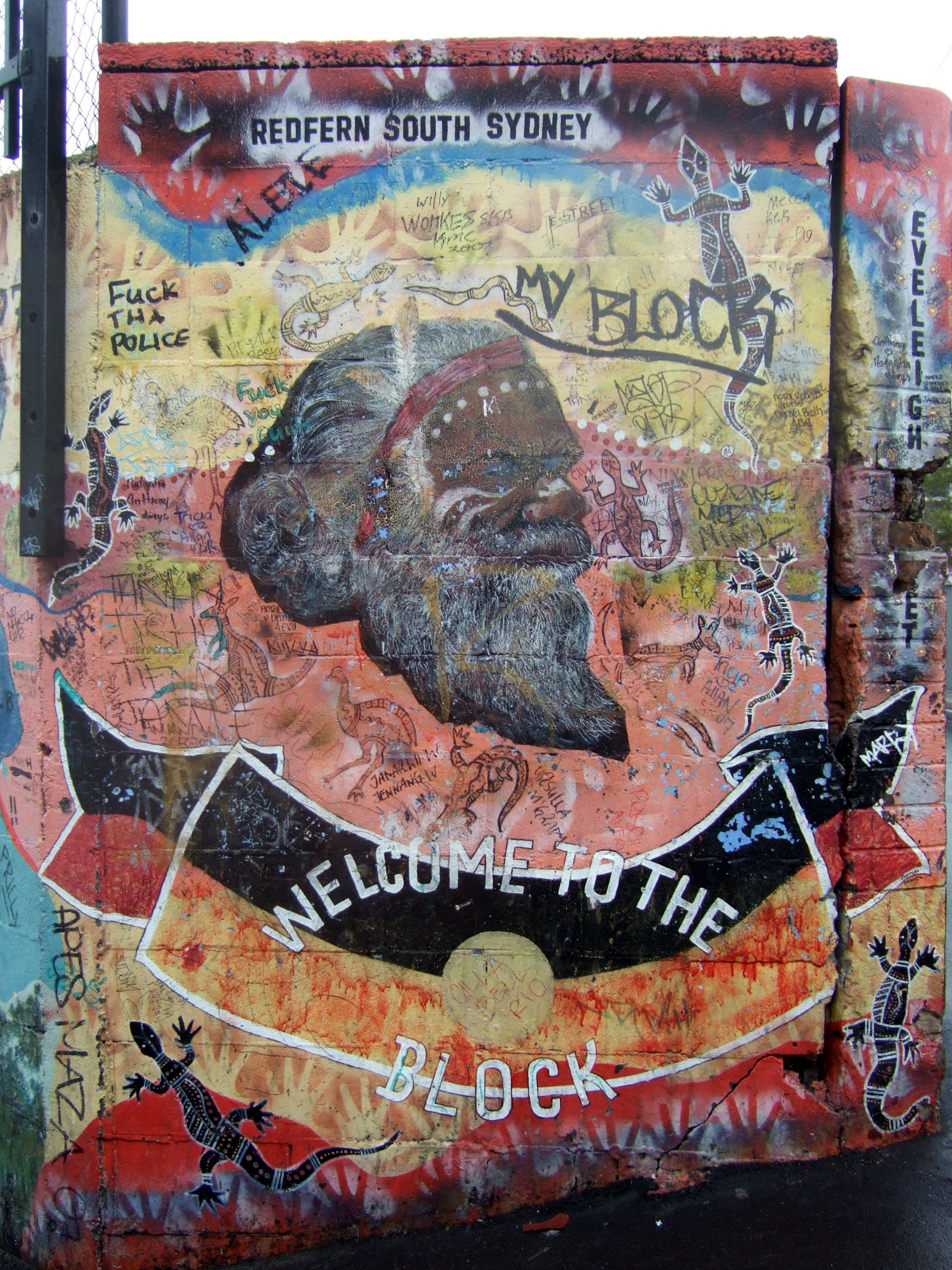
A mural on the corner of Lawson Street and Eveleigh Street (2008)

== Aboriginal Housing Company ==
The area was significant as an affordable source of low-cost housing for disadvantaged Aboriginal people. The Block has historically been the subject of large protests, starting in the early 1970s, when landlords in the area conducted a campaign of evicting all Aboriginal residents. Developer Ian Kiernan, who later founded Clean Up Australia, acquired around half of the housing in The Block in the early 1970s via his company Tierra del Fuego. A number of "Goomies" (Aboriginal homeless people) were squatting in his properties, and he called the police several times to evict them. The confrontations with police led to publicity via television news, which alerted the Whitlam government to the situation.

A group of campaigners, led by future judge Bob Bellear and his wife Kay, along with the Catholic priest Ted Kennedy, lobbied the federal Whitlam government, who bought up Kiernan's and other private properties. Kiernan's construction company, IBK Construction Pty Ltd, sold the houses at a cost price and was tasked with redeveloping the site, promising to hire additional Aboriginal people to complete the work. Kiernan said that he would not be making a profit, and saw it as "our contribution, and because we think people should get behind a responsible government which is doing something for the under-privileged". The Bellears lobbied the government for a grant via H. C. Coombs, chair of the Office of Aboriginal Affairs, in December 1972. In April 1973, Minister for Aboriginal Affairs Gordon Bryant announced on Sunday a federal government grant of A$530,000. This grant allowed the Aboriginal Housing Committee (AHC), an interim committee which later became the Aboriginal Housing Company, (Note: Sometimes incorrectly referred to as Aboriginal Housing Co-operative) to commence purchasing houses. The Builders Labourers Federation was very supportive, and key to convincing Whitlam to enter the arrangement. Bob and Sol Bellear attended the auctions, and properties were acquired cheaply. There was some debate whether they to form a co-operative, but eventually it was decided to register as a company, with many shareholders and a board. Richard Pacey was appointed as director of the board, and the company had access to funding by the Aboriginal Development Commission for repairs. The company was incorporated in 1973.

The narrow back yards were combined into a large communal area and landscape, and included a children's playground. The mayor of South Sydney Council, W. C. Hartup, sent a telegram to Whitlam in protest against the decision to redevelop the housing.

Other people involved in the early days were Bob's brother Sol Bellear; Lyall Munro Jnr and his wife Jenny Munro; Gary Foley; Paul Coe and his sister Isabel Coe; Billy Craigie (later Isabel's husband); Gary Williams; Naomi Mayers; retired boxer Dick Blair (1937–2013), aka Pastor Richard Phillips, then a field officer for South Sydney Community Aid; and non-Indigenous architect Col James (1936–2013).

As houses became available for occupation, priority was given to women with children. Later, a hostel was built at the end of Eveleigh Street to house the homeless people. New Dawn published an article about the Redfern Housing Project in February 1974. According to Col James, "Redfern was the first urban land rights [case]; that’s why it is a really important site in historical terms".

A year after the Fraser government was elected in 1975, it terminated capital works funding to The Block, leading to many homes falling into disrepair. Over the following few years, the AHC acquired almost half the properties on the Block, and the election of the Hawke–Keating government in 1983 led to renewed support for the Aboriginal community in Redfern. In 1994 the AHC acquired the last house on the Block.

According to Col James, although the housing worked really well for its first ten years, it was found that fixed rents led to overcrowding, and there were rent arrears and not enough coming in for ongoing maintenance and repairs. After these issues were sorted, there was a decade in which the AHC secured funding to build new housing, starting with the redevelopment of houses on the corner of Caroline and Louis Streets. There were tensions between Aboriginal and non-Aboriginal residents, exacerbated by alcohol abuse and an influx of Aboriginal people from country areas. An incident which involved the destruction by fire of some white residents' home after some Aboriginal children threw firecrackers through an open window (in retribution for reporting their friends for tunnelling underneath a house on the corner of Caroline and Eveleigh Street), and there were calls to shut down the AHC. A report was commissioned by Pat O'Shane, then director of NSW Aboriginal Affairs. Leonie Sandercock, then professor of planning at Macquarie University, Canadian social planner Wendy Sarkissian, Col James, and Ivor Lloyd, an African American man, were involved in the study. Recommending that much of the English-style terraced housing, which faced and west, should be demolished, this led to a "third phase" of development around 2002, in which of Aboriginal culture and needs should be prioritised. It was also important to create affordable, sustainable, and adaptable housing. City West Housing Company, which created housing in the Ultimo/Pyrmont area, was looked to as a model. The 2002-4 Community Social Plan developed by Angie Pitts for AHC won an international award for its crime prevention through environmental design. It also addressed the issue of what Col James called a "mission mentality" among some residents, by advocating a mixed model, with at least 42 households owning their homes, and around 20 tenants forming five households, for mutual support.

In 2010, the Aboriginal Housing Company decided to demolish a part of The Block that had deteriorated into a slum. By 2014, the character was changing; young professionals were moving into the area, and there were houses advertised for rent in Eveleigh Street for between A$1000 and A$1200 per week.

In 2017 it was reported that the core founding group comprised eight people, of whom Lyall Munro was the only one still alive.

=== Pemulwuy Project ===
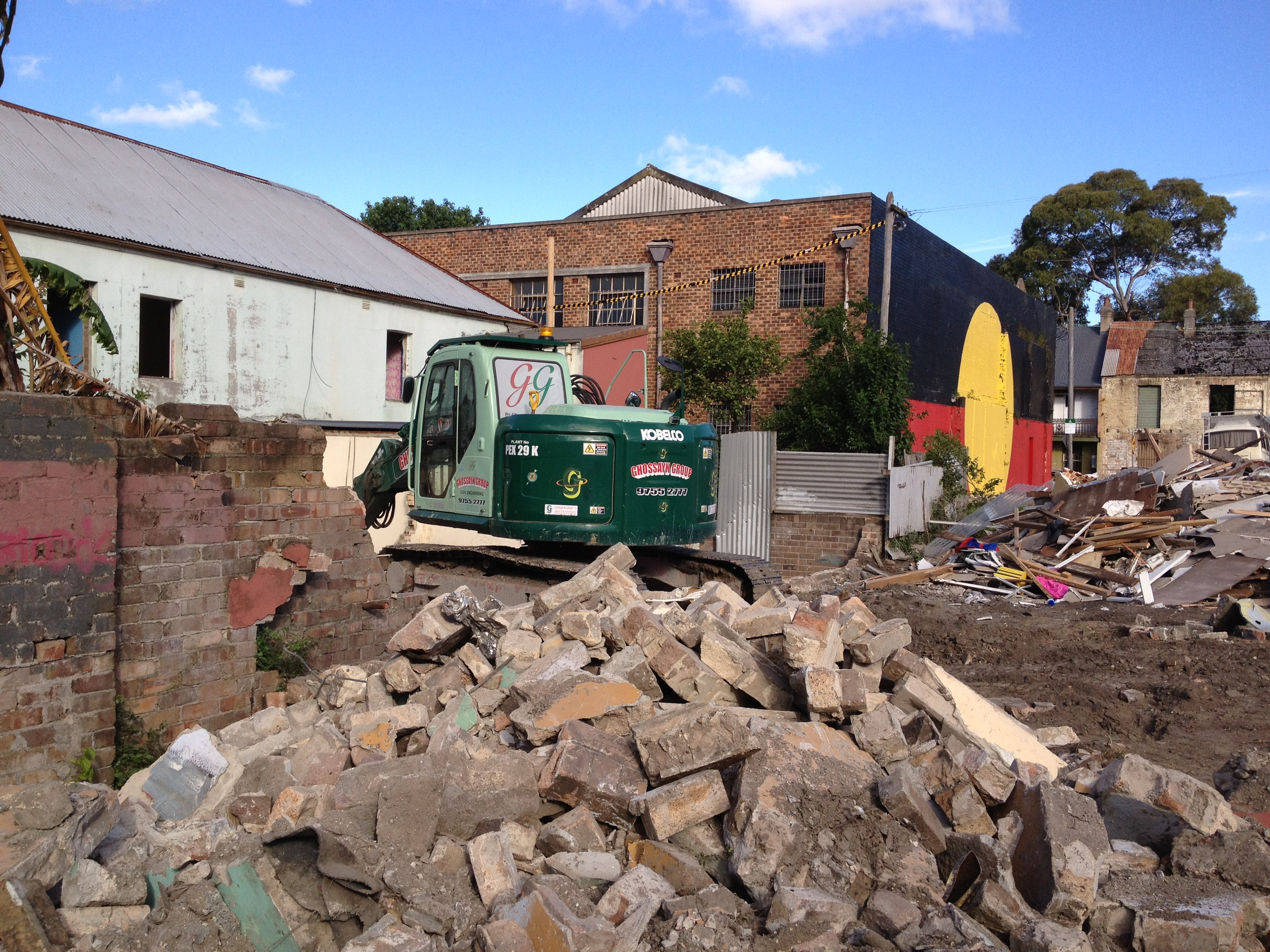
Demolition of the Block in 2011

The AHC's plan for the redevelopment of The Block, known as The Pemulwuy Project (after the 18th-century Bidjigal warrior Pemulwuy), was met with some opposition by the state government in 2008. Demolition of The Block was announced in late 2010, which led to some opposition, including the Redfern Aboriginal Tent Embassy (based on the idea of the Aboriginal Tent Embassy set up in Canberra in 1972), set up in 2014 by Lyall Munro Jnr, his wife Jenny Munro, and other activists, to protest against the redevelopment.

During the 2010s and 2020s, the Block has been the site of many developments.

In March 2017, there was a meeting of around 200 people at the Redfern Community Centre, which had been called to enable the community to ask the AHC about its plans to increase the size of the development. At that time, Alisi Tutuila was chair of the AHC, and Lani Tuitavake was general manager. Many criticised the move, and Lyall Munro (sole survivor of the original eight founders) spoke out against it. It appeared that divisions had emerged between the AHC and sections of the community since the early days. Critics say that the AHC, as a private operator, has abandoned its roots as a community organisation.

On 14 June 2017, AHC submitted the development application to the NSW Department of Planning for Precinct 3, the Col James Accommodation, comprising 522 rooms, located on the eastern side of Eveleigh Street, next to the railway line. Student housing provider Altira is responsible for construction and management of the accommodation. The Col James Student Accommodation building, designed by Turner Studios, provides accommodation for 596 students. The final version of the plans was approved in March 2019, and includes a 24-storey building, with a three-storey building comprising services and common rooms for the students across a courtyard.

In June 2019, the iconic mural featuring the Aboriginal Flag, painted on the side of the Elouera Tony Mundine Gym, was demolished. In its place there would be an underground car park and 36 townhouses will be constructed above it. As of 2020, Mick Mundine was CEO of the AHC.

The design of the Pemulwuy Project won an award for development excellence in 2021. A complex designed by Nordon Jago comprising housing, gymnasium, and Indigenous art gallery was recognised at the Urban Taskforce Development Excellence Awards in November 2021. The railway wall, previously covered with Aboriginal-themed murals, was retained, with the original artist, Danny Eastwood, commissioned to do the repainting of the murals.

On 25 July 2023, there was a joint celebration of the Aboriginal Housing Company's 50th birthday, and the official completion of the Pemulwuy Project.

== 2004 Redfern riot ==
On 14 February 2004, The Block was the scene of 2004 Redfern riots following the death of an Aboriginal boy, TJ Hickey. Hickey died after, while on his bicycle, he collided with a protruding gutter, was flung into the air and was impaled on a 2.5 m (8 ft 2 in) fence outside a block of units off Phillip Street, Waterloo, as he was fleeing police. Hickey was transported from the scene to the Sydney Children's Hospital in a critical but stable condition. He died with his family by his side on 15 February due to the severity of his wounds.

The community were upset about the death, and riots ensued. Redfern railway station was damaged by fire. The ticketing area and station master's office were significantly damaged, and the windows in the front of the station were bricked up for almost a year afterwards to prevent further attacks. They were later replaced with glass windows.
