= Mum Shirl =

Australian activist

- Portrait
- Born: Colleen Shirley Perry Smith; 22 November 1923; Erambie Mission, New South Wales, Australia
- Died: 28 April 1998 (aged 74); Sydney, New South Wales, Australia
- Resting place: Botany Cemetery
- Occupation: Social worker
- Known for: Aboriginal rights
- Spouse: Cecil "Darcy" Hazel Smith
- Children: 2 (1 died during childbirth)

Colleen Shirley Perry Smith AM MBE (22 November 1923 – 28 April 1998), better known as Mum Shirl, was a prominent Wiradjuri woman, social worker and humanitarian activist committed to justice and welfare of Aboriginal Australians. She was a founding member of the Aboriginal Legal Service, the Aboriginal Medical Service, the Aboriginal Tent Embassy, the Aboriginal Children's Services, and the Aboriginal Housing Company in Redfern, a suburb of Sydney. During her lifetime she was recognised as an Australian National Living Treasure.

== Biography ==
Mum Shirl was born as Colleen Shirley Perry on the Erambie Mission, in Wiradjuri country near Cowra, New South Wales, in 1924 to Joseph Perry and Isabell Smith. She did not attend a regular school because of her epilepsy and was taught by her grandfather and learned 16 different Aboriginal languages. She began to visit Aboriginal people in jail after one of her brothers was incarcerated and discovered that her visits also benefited other prisoners. Her community activism also saw her accompanying indigenous people who were unfamiliar with the legal system to court when they had been charged with a crime. Her nickname came from her habit of replying, "I’m his mum" whenever officials queried her relationship with the prisoners - the name by which she became widely known.

Because of her work visiting Aboriginal prisoners, Mum Shirl is the only woman in Australia to have been given unrestricted access to prisons in New South Wales. "She'd be at one end of the state one day, and seen at the other end of the state the next day. The department wasn't getting her from A to B. She used to rely on family and friends to get her around," said Ron Woodham from NSW Corrective Services. Later the Department of Corrective Services revoked her pass, making her prisoner support work near impossible.

Smith also spent considerable time and money finding homes for children whose parents could not look after them and helping displaced children to find their parents again. The children with nowhere to go often ended up living with her. By the early 1990s, she had raised over 60 children. Likewise, many people with no family or friends in Sydney arrived at Mum Shirl's Redfern house seeking shelter.

In 1970, Smith, along with Ken Brindle, and Chicka and Elsa Dixon, were the guiding force behind a group of young Aboriginal men and women who were involved in the campaign for land rights by the Gurindji people. This same group, with Fred Hollows and others helped to establish the Aboriginal Medical Service in July 1971. They also helped establish the Aboriginal Legal Service in 1971, the Aboriginal Black Theatre, the Aboriginal Tent Embassy, the Aboriginal Children's Services, the Aboriginal Housing Company and the Detoxification Centre at Wiseman's Ferry.

== Religion ==
Mum Shirl was an integral and committed part of the Catholic Church of St Vincent's Redfern with the prominent priest Father Ted Kennedy. She was a devout Catholic and a mistress of the bon mot: one of her favourites being "There's nothing out of plumb with the Catholic religion; it's the way Catholics practise it." Kennedy said that she had "a capacity to comfort the afflicted but never suggested that she would not afflict the comfortable". Smith also gave regularly of her time to visit largely non-Indigenous schools through groups such as the Red Land Society at St. Augustine's College and communities as part of educating the broader Australian community on Aboriginal issues and concerns. In the late 1960s, Mum Shirl began as an adviser for the Cardinal of the Archdiocese of Sydney.

== Awards ==
She was made a Member of the Order of the British Empire in 1977 and the Order of Australia (1985). The National Aboriginal and Islander Day Observance Committee (NAIDOC) named Mum Shirl as Aborigine of the Year in 1990. Just a few months before her death, the National Trust acknowledged her as one of Australian National Living Treasures.

== Health and death ==
Mum Shirl had epilepsy throughout her life. She was badly injured in a car crash after which she had a heart attack and was in the hospital for seven months. She died on 28 April 1998. Her funeral at St Mary's Cathedral, Sydney, was presided over by her friend Father Ted Kennedy and was attended by several dignitaries including the Governor-General of Australia, Sir William Deane, as well as many people whom she had helped over the years.

== Legacy ==
Two years after her death, Bronwyn Bancroft and the Boomalli Aboriginal Artists Co-operative organised a tribute exhibition of artworks in her honour.

On 8 July 2018, Mum Shirl was featured in a Google Doodle in honour of NAIDOC Week, which that year had the theme: "Because of her, we can!" The doodle was designed by Bigambul artist Cheryl Moggs.

A tunnel boring machine used in New South Wales is named after her.

The therapeutic unit for female offenders who cannot be safely managed elsewhere within the NSW prison system is named after her: Mum Shirl Unit (MSU) which has been opened in 2009 within the Silverwater Correctional Complex.

== Sources ==
- Mum Shirl with the assistance of Bobbi Sykes, Mum Shirl: an autobiography, Mammoth Australia, 1992, ISBN 978-1-86330-144-2
