= Harry Wedge =

Australian Aboriginal artist (1957–2012)

- Born: 1957; Sydney, New South Wales, Australia
- Died: 8 November 2012 (aged 54–55); Cowra, New South Wales, Australia
- Other names: HJ Wedge, Harry J
- Known for: Painting

Harry James "HJ" Wedge (1957 – 8 November 2012) was a Wiradjuri artist.

== Early life and education ==
Wedge was born in Erambie Mission, Cowra, New South Wales. Prior to starting his artwork professionally, Wedge worked as a driver and fruit picker until he headed to Sydney to enrol at the Eora Centre for the Visual and Performing Arts.

== Career ==
After graduating from the college he became a member of the Boomalli Aboriginal Artists Cooperative, exhibiting with contemporaries such as Ian Abdulla and Elaine Russell. In 1992 he held a solo exhibition called Wiradjuri Spirit Man at Tandanya National Aboriginal Cultural Institute in Adelaide as well as at Boomalli.

In 1993, Wedge was represented in Australian Perspecta at the Art Gallery of New South Wales and was artist-in-residence during which he created the narrative work Stop and think.

The Art Gallery of NSW describes Wedge's work in the following way: "His work focuses on post-colonial narrative and examines current social and environmental issues. He has said that he tries "...to paint what I dream, what I hear on, things you can even hear people talking about on the train...". His powerful paintings operate seductively, enchanting the viewer with signature lyrical figures that he combines with arresting political statements. His figures, refusing to be silenced, become social commentators and express the injustices of the past".

A monograph on Wedge's work, Wiradjuri Spirit Man, was published in 1996 by Art and Australia, with an introduction by Brenda L. Croft and an essay by Judith Ryan. Containing a selection of Wedge's vivid paintings and engaging stories, his work is by turns humorous, confronting and direct.

His work is held in many major private and public collections, including the National Gallery of Australia, National Gallery of Victoria and Queensland Art Gallery.

== Recognition ==
Wedge was awarded the Australian Aboriginal Fellowship by the New South Wales Minister for the Arts.

== Death and legacy ==
He died on 8 November 2012. His funeral was held at St Raphael's Church in Cowra.
