= Dulcie Flower =

Indigenous Australian health worker and human rights activist

Dulcie Flower AM is an Australian human rights activist and healthcare worker dedicated to the improvement of Aboriginal and Torres Strait Islander peoples’ health and well-being. She campaigned for constitutional change for Australia's First Nations people, including the 1967 referendum. Dulcie worked with other activists to establish the first Aboriginal community-controlled health service in Australia, the Aboriginal Medical Service in the inner Sydney suburb of Redfern.

== Early life and education ==
Dulcie Flower was born in Cairns, Queensland, in 1938, growing up with strong ties to her family in the Torres Strait Islands. She is a Miri woman of the Meriam nation from the Torres Strait Islands.

Flower trained to be a Registered Nurse in Cairns before moving to Sydney to continue her training.

== Career and activism ==
Flower became actively involved in the education and training of Indigenous health workers.

She was a founding member of the first Aboriginal community-controlled health service, the Aboriginal Medical Service at Redfern in inner Sydney in 1971. Flower developed the first Aboriginal health workers (AHWs) course in 1984 at Redfern, and the AMS soon afterwards started running post-graduate course in mental health care. These later moved to educational institutions.

Flower was a foundation member of the Congress of Aboriginal and Torres Strait Island Nurses and Midwives.

She was also involved in the 1967 referendum campaign.

== Recognition and awards ==
Flower is an honorary fellow of the Australian College of Nursing.

The Queensland Nurses and Midwives Union (QNMU) presents an excellence award named for Aunty Dulcie Flower and Aunty Gracelyn Smallwood, which recognises a First Nations nurse who has contributed positively to the Aboriginal and Torres Strait Islander nursing and midwifery professions or health outcomes for Aboriginal and Torres Strait Islander peoples and communities.

In 1994 she was awarded an Order of Australia Medal, in recognition of service to the community, particularly on the area of Aboriginal health worker training, and noting her work in the founding of the Aboriginal Medical Service, in Redfern.

In 2019 she was made a Member of the Order of Australia, for significant service to the Indigenous community and to the 1967 Referendum campaign.

Flower received the NAIDOC Lifetime Achievement Award in 2024, recognising her long involvement in campaigns for improved outcomes for First Nations peoples in regard to cultural recognition, industrial equality, health, legal protections, education, housing, clean water, proper waste disposal, and land ownership..

== Works ==
- Dulcie Flower (1987) Aboriginal Women's Health: An Overview. Aboriginal and islander health worker journal, 1987-06, Vol.11 (2), p.3-11
- Dulcie Flower (1993) Launching of the International Year of the World's Indigenous People. Aboriginal and islander health worker journal, Vol. 17 (1), p.17-19
- Dulcie Flower (1993) Launching of the International Year of the World's Indigenous People. The Aboriginal child at school, Vol.21 (3), p.9-11
