= Dick Blair =

Indigenous Australian boxer, pastor, and community leader (1937–2013)

Dick Blair (born Richard Carl Phillips; 1937 – 9 April 2013), also known as Dickie Blair, was an Aboriginal Australian professional boxer, Christian pastor, and community leader in Sydney, Australia. He became the Australian middleweight boxing champion in 1972, and was later involved in the Aboriginal Housing Committee in Redfern as well as mentorship of young people in the area.

== Early life ==
Richard Carl Phillips was born in Fingal Head, in the Tweed Coast region of New South Wales.

He started work as a cane cutter before moving south to Redfern, Sydney, in the late 1960s. During that time there was a new wave of the Aboriginal rights movement, and the 1967 referendum.

== Athletic career ==
Phillips became known as Dick Blair during his boxing career, and was also referred to as Dickie Blair. His boxing career spanned 12 years, beginning in 1963 and turning professional in 1964. For some time he trained Tony Mundine. His boxing stance was orthodox.

In 1968 Blair won the vacant Australian Middleweight title by stopping Bob Murdoch in 10 rounds. He lost the title in 1969 losing a 15-round decision to Billy Choules. Among others, he fought Charkey Ramon, Alipate Korovou, Johnny Gorkom, Fred Taupola,Tuna Scanlan, Trevor Christian, Bob Dunlop,Trevor Thornberry, and Jim Brown (Withers). He retired in 1975, having fought 85 bouts, and with a record of 46 wins-31-5.

== Activism ==
He became a pastor with the local Pentecostal Church in Redfern, when he was known as Pastor Richard Phillips. He co-founded Koori Lighthouse Youth with his wife Yvonne Phillips. (Note: Some sources spell her name as Evonne, but she is mostly referred to as Yvonne, and credited thus for the 2016 documentary Heart of the Fight.) They also set up the Aboriginal Christian Youth Organisation on Holden Street. This included a workshop for training unemployed people, a kitchen, and accommodation for a few homeless children.

He lived in Redfern for many years, and continued to be referred to as Dick Blair. In 1973 he was a field officer for South Sydney Community Aid, an Aboriginal advancement group. As a community leader, he was one of the originators of the Redfern Housing Project, which led to the creation of the Aboriginal-run social housing development known as The Block. In April 1973, the federal government under Gough Whitlam provided funding for the development of the project. In 1974 Blair provided input to the Aboriginal Housing Committee. Architect Col James was also on the board of South Sydney Community Aid, and got involved in The Block through Blair.

== Recognition ==
In 2007, Phillips was featured in a tribute program on the Sweet Science weekly national radio show, which was broadcast to over 50 stations on the National Indigenous Radio Service, Koori Radio in Redfern. The program also featured boxing journalist Tony Pritchard-Nobbs, along with former opponents Jim Withers (Brown) and Alan Moore. (Note: "Sweet science" refers to the sport of boxing.)

A photographic portrait of Phillips by Mervyn Bishop was exhibited in the Sydney Elders exhibition at The Australian Museum in Sydney in 2012. The exhibition was mounted "to celebrate and share the significant commitment and achievements of local [Aboriginal] Elders... [who] contributed to the important role of culture, education, health, community or social justice".

Phillips featured in the 2016 documentary Heart of the Fight: The Story of Dick Blair, directed by Byron Arellano and Mark Taylor and executive produced by Sri Lankan playwright S Shakthidharan with CuriousWorks. CuriousWorks is a Western Sydney community arts organisation established as a start-up "committed to telling diverse community stories" in 2005 by S. Shakthidharan.

Phillips' son, Shane Phillips, worked with Taylor on the film. Taylor described Blair and his wife Yvonne as "spiritual leader[s]" who "were a pillar of strength for their community through the darkest days of The Block's history.

== Personal life and death ==
Dick and Yvonne Phillips had nine of their own children, and fostered many more. Their son Shane Phillips played for the Redfern All Blacks, and was a life member since around 1977, later assistant coach. He is also a community elder, and CEO of a social enterprise for Aboriginal youth called Tribal Warrior.

He spent his later life split between the Tweed Heads region and Sydney, a respected elder. He died in Sydney on 9 April 2013, aged 75.
