= Bob Bellear =

Australian judge

Judge of the District Court of New South Wales
- In office 1996–2005

Personal details
- Born: Robert William Bellear; 17 April 1944
- Died: 15 March 2005 (aged 60) Sydney, New South Wales, Australia
- Citizenship: Australian
- Spouse: Kaye Williams
- Education: UNSW (LLB 1978)
- Profession: Lawyer

Robert William "Bob" Bellear (17 June 1944 – 15 March 2005) was an Australian social activist, lawyer and judge who was the first Aboriginal Australian judge. He served as a judge of the District Court of New South Wales from 1996 until his death in 2005.

== Early life ==
Bellear was born in the far north-east of New South Wales, and grew up near the town of Mullumbimby and he was a Bundjalung man. His grandfather was a Ni-Vanuatu man who was blackbirded to Australia to work on a sugar plantation, and his grandmother was an Aboriginal Australian woman from Minjerribah (also known as Stradbroke Island) in Queensland. His other grandfather had been blackbirded from the Solomon Islands. Bellear was one of nine children and, Aboriginal rights advocate, Sol Bellear was his brother.

He left school early, but could not get a job, a fact which Bellear often attributed to racism. Instead, he joined the Royal Australian Navy, where he was trained in mechanical engineering and clearance diving. He was a successful rugby union player for the Navy's representative side. He was the first Indigenous person to achieve the rank of petty officer. Bellear left the Navy in 1968, with several qualifications, including masonry and fitting and turning. He was then able to easily find a job.

For some time Bellear lived in Redfern with his wife Kaye Williams, whom he had met while in the Navy. The suburb had a substantial Aboriginal population at the time. Bellear co-founded the Aboriginal Housing Company there in 1972 along with his wife Kaye and others, and throughout the 1970s was a director of both the Aboriginal Medical Service and the Aboriginal Legal Service. Bellear was the leader of a campaign to prevent landlords in Redfern from evicting Aboriginal tenants, and his work led to the Whitlam government transferring ownership of The Block to the Aboriginal Housing Corporation.

== Legal education and career ==
Bellear would regularly see the patterns of intimidation and harassment which the New South Wales Police practised against the Aboriginal community in Redfern.

In 1972, Bellear decided that he would study law. He completed his Higher School Certificate studies at Sydney Technical College, and entered a law course at the University of New South Wales. He became only the second Indigenous person to graduate from that university (after Pat O'Shane) when he graduated in 1978. He was admitted to the New South Wales Bar in 1979. As a barrister, he represented many Aboriginal people in criminal trials, and was often instructed by the Aboriginal Legal Service. In 1987 Bellear was appointed as an assisting counsel to the Royal Commission into Aboriginal Deaths in Custody.

In 1993 he was awarded an honorary doctorate of laws by Macquarie University. On 17 May 1996, Bellear was appointed a judge of the District Court of New South Wales, the first Indigenous person to be appointed to any court in Australia. He served as a judge until his death. During this time he mentored young Indigenous lawyers, and encouraged students to attend his courtroom. He did not try to remain in Sydney, instead preferring the rural circuit, where he could visit Aboriginal communities in regional centres, and bring students into his courtroom.

== Personal life ==
In his later life, Bellear was diagnosed with peritoneal mesothelioma, contracted during his time with the Royal Australian Navy, when as an apprentice engineer he was exposed to asbestos fibers. Bellear died at his home on 15 March 2005, wearing a Che Guevara T-shirt. He was survived by his wife, two children Joanne and Kali (a third son, Malu died in his early twenties in 1996) and four grandchildren. The Government of New South Wales granted Bellear a state funeral, held at the Sydney Town Hall. It was attended by about 2000 guests, including Governor of New South Wales Marie Bashir and former Chief Justice of New South Wales Laurence Street.
