= Cheryl Moggs =

Indigenous Australian artist and teacher

- Born: Queensland, Australia
- Occupation: artist
- Notable work: 2018 NAIDOC Week poster

Cheryl Moggs is an Indigenous Australian teacher and artist, notable for her watercolor paintings. She is also a photographer, works in textiles and weaves baskets. Her artwork "tarmunggie-woman" won the 2018 poster contest for the National Aborigines and Islanders Day Observance Committee (NAIDOC) Week. Her Google doodle design in honor of the indigenous leader Mum Shirl was featured on Google's website on 8 July 2018.

== Career ==
Moggs began her career as a teacher, helping students integrate their cultural heritage into their art. She has taught in a variety of settings, from university classes to educational programs in prison. For her own watercolor paintings, Moggs says she draws inspiration from her Bigamul heritage. Moggs works in a variety of mediums as a visual artist, including photography, textiles and basket weaving. Her first solo exhibition was held in 2017 at the Texas Regional Art Gallery in Texas, Queensland.

Moggs was the winner of the 2018 NAIDOC Week national poster contest. Her poster, entitled "tarmunggie – woman", expressed appreciation of inspiring indigenous women who have been trailblazers and leaders, in keeping with that year's NAIDOC Week theme "Because of her we can!" It had three overlaying layers that represented "dreamtime, culture and knowledge". The artwork was selected as the winner of the contest from among 200 entries, one of the largest number of entries for a NAIDOC poster contest. As part of the celebrations for NAIDOC Week, her artwork was placed on display in the Parliament House in Canberra. Moggs also received a cash prize.

The same year, Moogs created a Google doodle honoring Mum Shirl, which was displayed on the Google website on 8 July 2018. The doodle included a black and white image of Mum Shirl layered over traditional designs, along with the words "Because of her we can!"

== Personal life ==
Moggs grew up in Toobeh, Queensland, later moving to Brisbane after she had children. By 2018, she was living in Goondiwindi, Queensland.
