= Sol Bellear =

Sol Bellear AM

Deputy chair of ATSIC
- In office 1991–1994

ATSIC Commissioner for NSW Metro
- In office 1991–1994

ATSIC Regional Councillor for Sydney
- In office 1990–1994 Serving with 19 others

Personal details
- Born: Solomon David Bellear; 1950/1951
- Died: 29 November 2017 (aged 66) Sydney, New South Wales
- Relations: Bob Bellear (brother)

Solomon David Bellear AM (1950/1951 – 29 November 2017) was an Aboriginal Australian public figure.

== Early life ==
Bellear was a Bundjalung man.and he was brought up in the far north of New South Wales, in Mullumbimby, and was one of nine children. His brother Bob Bellear became a judge.

== Activism ==
In 1970 Bellear was part of a delegation that intended to speak to the United Nations General Assembly on Aboriginal and Torres Strait Islander issues. The trip involved attending the "Congress of the African People" in Atlanta, Georgia, United States.

Bellear was the first chair of the Aboriginal Legal Service when it was founded in the early 1970s. Also at that time, he was an active participant in the founding of the Aboriginal Housing Company, that manages The Block in Redfern.

He was the chairman of the Aboriginal Medical Service in Redfern and was on the board from 1975 until his death.

In 1990 Bellear became a member of the Aboriginal and Torres Strait Islander Commission (ATSIC), becoming elected as one of 20 councillors for the Sydney region. He was subsequently elected a commissioner for the NSW Metropolitan Zone. He served as deputy chair before stepping down in 1994.

Bellear introduced Paul Keating at the 1992 Redfern Park Speech. When recalling the speech Bellear said:

Well, thwat’s it. People say that they remember where they were at the time. I was right there on stage with him, and along with Stan Grant. Stan Grant of course was the MC. The day itself was just something unbelievable. It was just like a gathering, a prime minister giving a speech. Yes, it was in Redfern; yes, it was about Aboriginal people. But then into the speech, it just erupted. I mean that speech would have to be one of the most brilliant speeches ever, ever in Australia, if not the southern hemisphere

— Sol Bellear, as quoted in 'Memories of the Redfern Speech: a tribute to Sol Bellear'

== Rugby league ==
During the late 1970s he was graded by the South Sydney Rabbitohs. He was also involved in the Redfern All Blacks, that played at the Koori Knockout competition.

Bellear was a director of South Sydney from 2002 until resigning over the takeover of Russell Crowe and Peter Holmes a Court in 2006.

Bellear was team manager of the Indigenous Dreamtime team who played a Māori team in an exhibition match that preceded the 2008 Rugby League World Cup.

== Honours ==
In 1999 Bellear became a Member of the Order of Australia (AM) for services to the Aboriginal community. The citation mentions his work in Aboriginal health.
