= Tiddas (novel) =

Book by Anita Heiss

- First edition
- Author: Anita Heiss
- Language: English
- Publisher: Kogan Page
- Publication date: Simon & Schuster Australia
- Publication place: Australia
- Pages: 368
- ISBN: 9781922052285
- Preceded by: Am I Black Enough For You

Tiddas is a novel by Anita Heiss published in 2014. The title Tiddas is an Aboriginal term for "women who are like sisters".

The book is about five women who have been friends since childhood who come together for book club meetings.

== Reception ==
Dianne Dempsey of the Sydney Morning Herald comments "While Tiddas may at times have a didactic tone, it is this political subtext, the subversive nature of the book, that provides any interest or edge." Laura Brodnik of bmag says that "it's also a love letter to the city of Brisbane." Lou Heinrich of lip states that it is "depicting urban Aboriginal women in an easily consumable book."

== Adaptation ==
Heiss was commissioned to adapt the book for the stage by La Boite Theatre Company, Brisbane Festival and Queensland Performing Arts Centre. It premiered in 2022. Tiddas was restaged by Belvoir Theatre for the 2024 Sydney Festival.
