= Muurrbay Aboriginal Language and Culture Co-operative =

Centre of Aboriginal Australian languages in New South Wales

Muurrbay Aboriginal Language and Culture Co-operative is a language revitalisation centre for Aboriginal Australian languages of a region in New South Wales, situated in Nambucca Heads.

== History ==
In 1986, several elders of the Gumbaynggirr people got together with the aim of reviving their language. In collaboration with linguist and teacher Brother Steve Morelli OAM, they established a plan to revive the language. First, they found the last remaining recordings of Gumbaynggirr, in order to build up the vocabulary and to create a grammar of the language. In that year, Morelli (nicknamed "Gugs") worked with the group, which included Maggie Morris, and the Gumbaynggirr Language and Culture Group was established in Sherwood.

After obtaining funding from the federal government the elders published the first Gumbaynggirr dictionary-grammar, in 1992. A second edition of Gumbaynggirr dictionary and learners grammar was published in 2015.

The success of the centre led to growth and expansion. Muurrbay was confirmed as a Registered Training Organisation (RTO) in 1997 and started offering language classes. In 2004, it became a regional language centre, adding a further six languages to its offerings.

In 2014, the co-op received extra funding for language revitalisation.

== Description and governance ==
Muurrbay is a regional language and training centre focused on language revitalisation of seven Aboriginal languages in the Northern Rivers, Mid North Coast, and Central Coast of New South Wales. It is a Registered Training Organisation (RTO), and collaborates with local government and community groups about appropriate use of Indigenous history and names in public spaces. It also develops research programs for documentation and archival of linguistic and cultural materials, and collaborates with universities in other language research.

It publishes a variety of materials relating to language, as well as delivering services in linguistics, information technology, and education, including teaching language in local schools.

=== People ===
As of 2023, elder Gary Williams is CEO of Muurrbay. Micklo Jarrett is chair, and former politician Aden Ridgeway is also on the board.

As of August 2023 co-founder Steve Morelli ("Gugs") is still employed at the centre. He was born in Hungary and migrated to Australia with his family in the 1950s. He earned a BA in Languages, followed by graduate diplomas in linguistics and counselling, and has been recognised for his work at Muurrbay several times. In 1996 he received the Aboriginal Education Award of Excellence from the Department of School Education, Aboriginal Education Unit. He received the Patji-Dawes Language Teaching Award by the ARC Centre of Excellence for the Dynamics of Language in 2019 (the International Year of Indigenous Languages) for outstanding achievement, after being nominated by Gary Williams. In 2021 he was awarded an Order of Australia Medal "for services to the Indigenous Community of Mid-North-Coast NSW", which he said was shared with the local elders and community.

== Uses ==
Williams and other members of the Muurrbay team advised the actors in the 2016 ABC series Cleverman on pronunciation of Gumbaynggirr, which they used along with alongside the northern NSW language of Bundjalung.
