= AMS Redfern =

Indigenous Australian community-controlled health service in Sydney

Aboriginal Medical Services Redfern, known as AMS Redfern, formerly the Aboriginal Medical Service (AMS) is an Aboriginal Australian health service in the Sydney suburb of Redfern. Established around 1971, it was the first Aboriginal community-controlled health service in Australia. It became a key Indigenous Australian community organisation, from which most Aboriginal medical services around the State of New South Wales have stemmed.

Many Aboriginal community-controlled health services (ACCHSs) were subsequently founded across Australia, following the AMS model.

== History ==
At the time of the foundation of the AMS, there was no universal health care in Australia, such as Medicare provides today. Inadequate and overcrowded housing and poor nutrition were causing health problems among Aboriginal people that were rare in the mainstream community, and the issue was compounded by the reluctance of Aboriginal people to access mainstream health services for fear of racism, or because of mistrust or an inability to pay.

The foundation of the AMS was driven by Mum (Shirl) Smith, Dulcie Flower, Ken Brindle and Chicka and Elsa Dixon. It was set up by Gordon Briscoe, Dr. Fred Hollows, Dr Archie Kalokerinos, Dulcie Flower, and others, who were all concerned with the serious health problems of Aboriginal Australians in Sydney. Its growth was encouraged by Redfern parish priest Fr Ted Kennedy. The Sisters of Mercy donated the property in which the Aboriginal Medical Service had been established to the Redfern Aboriginal community in 1978. Architect Col James, who did much work pro bono for various Aboriginal organisations, especially the Aboriginal Housing Company , also did work for the AMS.

Mum Shirl was the first field officer. Hollows recruited medical students, doctors and volunteers. Founders also included Paul Coe, Dulcie Flower, John Russell, and Ross McKenna. Aboriginal journalist John Newfong was the inaugural director, and Andrew Refshauge the chief medical practitioner. Naomi Mayers joined as secretary in 1972, later becoming CEO.

Inspired by the success of the Aboriginal Legal Service in providing free services to the Aboriginal community, the group applied for a government grant, and opened the service in a shopfront in Regent Street, Redfern. Its structure mirrored the Aboriginal Legal Service, with prominent community members acting as field officers and white professionals donating their time. The service was controlled by Aboriginal people. Its popularity was so great that it soon became unable to meet the demand for services.

While the New South Wales Department of Aboriginal Affairs appeared committed to the service at first, the organisation struggled for secure funding during its first five years of operation. The department regularly delayed its assessment of funding applications, acquittals and payments, forcing the organisation to operate on bank overdrafts and donations from the community. The centre was staffed by volunteers, and doctors brought their own equipment to use. Despite this, the AMS provided all services free, with the option to donate if the patient felt able. The struggle for funds continued for around 15 years.

The service employed a holistic approach to health care from the beginning. Aboriginal health issues were viewed within the paradigm of Indigenous people's social, economic and political status in Australian society, and it was considered necessary to address this disadvantage in order to improve Aboriginal health. The underlying agenda of the service was political in that it sought to enable Aboriginal people to control their own destinies.

The AMS, in association with Sol Bellear, Paul Coe, Mum Shirl, and Kaye Edwards, set up a breakfast program for children in a park in Newtown, serving food from a caravan borrowed from the Wayside Chapel.

In 1977 the service moved to newly renovated premises in Turner Street, Redfern. A variety of specialist clinics were offered, as well as a general practice and dental clinic.

Dulcie Flower developed the first Aboriginal health workers (AHWs) course in 1984 at Redfern, and the AMS soon afterwards started running post-graduate course in mental health care. These later moved to educational institutions.

At some time before 2012, the Aboriginal Medical Service changed its name to AMS Redfern.

The Aboriginal Medical Service inspired Aboriginal communities across the country to establish their own medical services, and by 2008 there were over 60 Aboriginal-controlled health services in the state of New South Wales. By 2012, there were 150 Aboriginal community-controlled health services (ACCHSs), following the AMS model, in urban, regional and remote Australia.

In 2012, Naomi Mayers was CEO of the organisation. By this time, AMS had grown into a multidisciplinary health service, comprising a broad range of services and clinics. Apart from general medical, these included dental clinics, public health programs, and outreach services. It was also operating as a teaching practice, employing registrars and providing short-term placements for medical and nursing students from the University of Sydney. A number of hospitals and other organisations also collaborated with AMS.

The modern centre was designed by Merrima company, and built on the donated land adjacent to the St Vincent's Roman Catholic community including the church, presbytery, convent and school built around 1887.

On 26 November 2022, the AMS held a gala dinner to celebrate the 50th anniversary of the AMS.

== Services ==
As of 2022, AMS Redfern, registered as Aboriginal Medical Service Cooperative Limited, describes itself as a "multi-functional non-for-profit organisation that delivers a broad range of services and community programs".

The joint CEOs are LaVerne Bellear and Aunty Dulcie Flower.
