= Erambie Mission =

Aboriginal community near Cowra, New South Wales, Australia

- Town
- Coordinates: 33.8464628°S 148.6782728°E
- Country: Australia
- State: New South Wales
- LGA: Cowra Shire

Government
  - State electorate: Cootmundra
  - Federal division: Riverina

Erambie Mission is an Aboriginal community located on the western banks of the Lachlan River, 2.5 km (1.6 mi) from the town of Cowra, in the Central West region of New South Wales, Australia.

== History ==
Erambie was operated by the New South Wales Government as an Aboriginal reserve.

The mission boasted a football team called the Erambie Allblacks, and there were many musicians in the community. During World War II, there were around 70,000 troops stationed at a training camp in Cowra, and people from the mission used to perform for them. They raised money for the war.

A woman called Jane Murray was a kind of matriarch to the community. She had 9 children, and worked with a doctor in Cowra.

The mission was laid out along three streets in a grid of tightly packed houses, but it contains no shops or library. It became home for most of the 700 Aboriginal people in the Cowra area. It was in existence in 1937.

Residents had to obey many rules and regulations, but as far back as the 1940s the mission had a reputation for Aboriginal rights protests staged by the residents.

Writer Bob Merritt's 1975 play, The Cake Man, portrayed life on the mission.

The Cowra ACS (Aboriginal Children's Services) was based at Erambie from 1975 to 2008.

== Prominent residents ==
Dr Laurie Bamblett, who grew up in Erambie, was in 2015 adjunct research fellow at the National Centre for Indigenous Studies at the Australian National University, after spending over two decades developing and conducting community education and health programs at Erambie.

Other residents have included:

- Isabel Coe
- Paul Coe
- Elsie Heiss, mother of Anita Heiss
- Bob Merritt (1945–2011), writer
- Jenny Munro
- Mum Shirl (Smith)
- Harry Wedge
- Claude "Candy" Williams
- Harry Williams
