= Dawn (magazine) =

Australian magazine created by the New South Wales Aboriginal Welfare Board

- Frequency: Monthly
- Publisher: Aboriginal Protection Board (1952–1969); Department of Child Welfare and Social Welfare (1970–1975)
- Founded: 1952
- Final issue: 1975
- Country: Australia
- Based in: Sydney
- Language: English
- ISSN: 0416-8003

Dawn (1952–1960) was an Australian magazine published in Sydney, created by the New South Wales Aborigines Welfare Board and aimed at Aboriginal Australians. It was relaunched by the NSW Department of Child Welfare and Social Welfare as New Dawn in April 1970, which ceased publication after July 1975. All back issues of both magazines are available online on the AIATSIS website.

== History ==
The magazine Dawn was created by the Aborigines Welfare Board in New South Wales, for Aboriginal readers. It ran monthly from January 1952 until December 1968. Two issues were published in 1969, before the disbanding of the Aboriginal Welfare Board led to the publication ceasing.

In 1953, E. J. Morgan, manager of Moree Aboriginal Station, wrote of the beneficial effects that the magazine had had on the Aboriginal people, including a better attitude towards the board and less interest in Communism. He reported that it was very popular and he felt that Dawn had "broken through the apathetic acceptance of their humble state, stimulated their self-respect, and their urge to achieve recognition in the general community", through reading about Aboriginal people who had achieved success in sports and other walks of life. It was described by Superintendent A. W. G. Lipscomb, Superintendent of the board, as a successful experiment:

It has done what it set out to do, bringing the aborigines a new outlook on life, educating them and telling them of each other. It is not merely a magazine for the aboriginal people, but also, and rather a magazine of the aboriginal people...

== New Dawn ==
The magazine was relaunched in April 1970 under the title New Dawn, published by the New South Wales Department of Child Welfare and Social Welfare. It continued to be produced on a monthly basis, but production slowed in 1974 and the final issue was published in July 1975.

== Availability ==
The Australian Indigenous Index, or INFOKOORI, is an online index to the fortnightly newspaper Koori Mail as well as to biographical information from various magazines, including all issues of Dawn and New Dawn. Back copies of both Dawn and New Dawn are available on the AIATSIS website, free for use.
