= Billy Craigie =

Aboriginal Australian activist

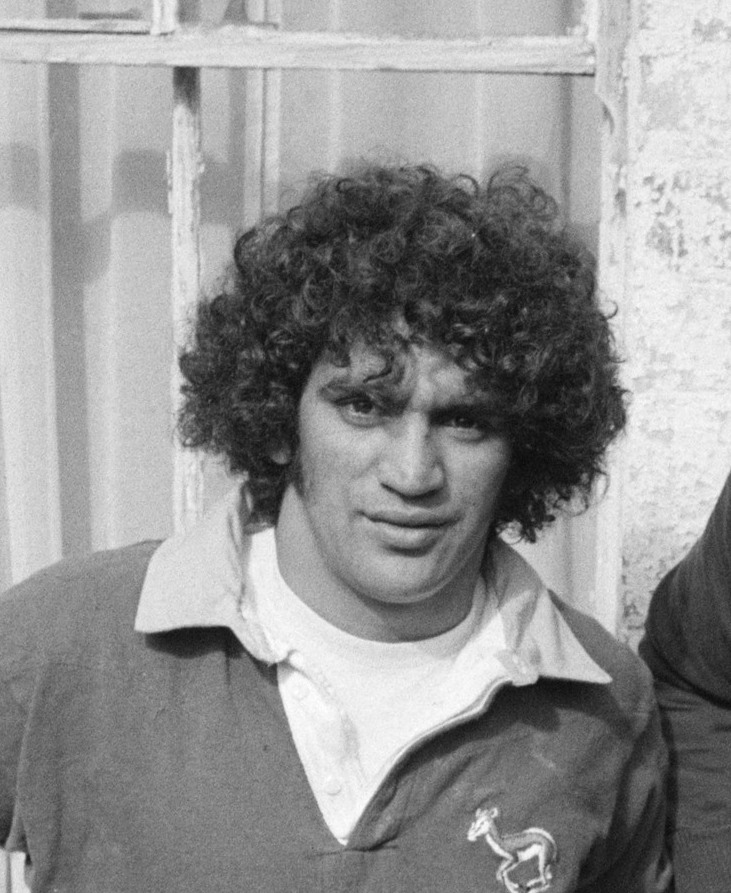
- Billy Craigie wearing a Springbok jersey, 1971
- Born: c. 1953; Moree, New South Wales, Australia
- Died: August 1998
- Known for: Aboriginal rights activism, Aboriginal Tent Embassy
- Spouse: Isabell Coe (before 1998)
- Relatives: William Hickey (grandson)

Billy Davo Craigie (born c. 1953 - August 1998) was an Aboriginal Australian activist. He was one of four co-founders of the Aboriginal Tent Embassy in 1972, the longest continuous protest for Indigenous land rights in the world.

Craigie grew up in Moree, New South Wales and was a member of the Gamilaraay people.

Craigie, along with Bert Williams, Michael Anderson, and Tony Coorey, sent up the Aboriginal Tent Embassy on the lawns of Parliament House in Canberra in response to the government's Australia Day statement on land rights. The statement proposed general purpose leases and not land rights; it required people to intend and be able to make "economic use of the land," and excluded forestry and mining rights. This was unacceptable to the activists, who wanted to be granted the rights to their ancestral lands. A documentary film, Ningla A-Na, was filmed about the protest in 1972.

The activists held a press conference and Craigie said they would maintain the space "indefinitely until we can work out our own Aboriginal government and maybe fill up the rest of the building with elected members from our own, Indigenous, sovereign nation". They, along with a few others were arrested for trespassing, but others came in to take their places. Craigie gave evidence at the trial, stating that the land the government had claimed was sacred, and that paintings and rock arrangements which would have indicated its status had been moved and disrupted when Canberra was settled.

In 1979, along with Cecil Patten, Craigie stole the paintings of Aboriginal artist Yirawala from a commercial gallery which was run by a white man. Their defence was that, since they were Aboriginal, and the paintings were Aboriginal-community owned, they believed they could take them legally to protect them. The case went to trial and the two were found not guilty. In 1980 he participated in a protest of the Brisbane Commonwealth Games.

In 1988 he protested the publication of John Molony's book The Penguin Bicentennial History of Australia by tossing a copy of the book into Sydney Harbour.

He was married to fellow prominent activist Isabell Coe.

Craigie's grandson, William Hickey, is a basketball player.
