= Isabell Coe =

Aboriginal Australian activist and leader (1951–2012)

- Born: 1951
- Died: 2012 (aged 60–61)
- Spouse: Billy Craigie (before 1998)
- Relatives: Paul Coe (brother); Jenny Munro (sister)

Isabell Edie Coe (1951–2012), who was often known by her shortened name Isabel Coe, was a Wiradjuri woman born at Erambie Mission near Cowra, and one of the most prominent Australian Aboriginal leaders.

== Activism ==
Coe was one of the activists who monitored police brutality and harassment against Aboriginal people, which led to the establishment of the Aboriginal Legal Service (ALS) in 1970.

She had a lead role in the running of the original Aboriginal Tent Embassy in Canberra, and was the lead litigant in Isabel Coe v the Commonwealth (1993), where she unsuccessfully tried to force the Australian government to recognise the sovereignty of the Wiradjuri nation.

== Family ==
She was the sister of prominent activists Paul Coe and Jenny Munro, and was married to Billy Craigie, one of the co-founders of the Aboriginal Tent Embassy, who died in 1998.
