= Aboriginal Legal Service (NSW/ACT) =

Australian legal services organisation

The Aboriginal Legal Service (NSW/ACT) (ALS), known also as Aboriginal Legal Service, is a community-run organisation in New South Wales and the Australian Capital Territory, founded in 1970 to provide legal services to Aboriginal Australians and Torres Strait Islanders and based in the inner-Sydney suburb of Redfern. It now has branches across NSW and ACT, with its head office in Castlereagh Street, Sydney and a branch office in Regent Street, Redfern.

The service was Australia’s first free legal service, setting the model for community legal aid, community legal centres and Aboriginal services Australia-wide.

== History ==
Gary Foley later wrote that the Aboriginal Legal Service had its roots in the Australian Black Power movement. This movement had emerged in Redfern, Sydney, Fitzroy, Melbourne, and South Brisbane, following the Freedom Ride led by Charles Perkins in 1965, and was amplified after media reporting on the talk on Black Power given by Caribbean activist Roosevelt Brown in Melbourne in 1968 at the Victorian Aborigines Advancement League, led by Bruce McGuinness and Bob Maza.

In 1970, a public meeting was held at St Luke's Presbyterian Church, Redfern, to propose an organisation which becomes the Aboriginal Legal Service. Aboriginal activists and lawyers, including Paul Coe, Isabel Coe, Gary Williams, Gary Foley, Tony Coorey, established the Aboriginal Legal Service (ALS) in Redfern. J. H. Wooten, then a professor of law at the University of New South Wales and later a judge of the Supreme Court of New South Wales, assisted in establishing the service and writing grant applications for funding. From the outset, it was staffed by volunteers who provided free legal advice and representation to the Aboriginal people of inner Sydney in response to rising incidences of harassment and indiscriminate arrests of Aboriginal people, abuse and intimidation.

In 1971, the service received government funding to provide a full-time solicitor, a field officer and a secretary, and the service was able to open a shop-front in Redfern. The Aboriginal Legal Service was formed into an unincorporated association. The involvement of Aboriginal people in both management and service delivery was critical to its acceptance among the community. The service elected to its board and employed as field officers leaders from diverse Aboriginal communities to ensure that the delivery of Aboriginal legal services was culturally appropriate. Architect Col James, who did much work pro bono for various Aboriginal organisations, especially the Aboriginal Housing Company , also did work for the ALS.

In 1991, the Royal Commission into Aboriginal Deaths in Custody (RCIADIC) report recommended that Aboriginal Legal Services engage in research in law reform as well as the provision of legal services. The ALS was the first organisation to operate a Custody Notification Service (CNS), after it was established in 2000 in response to the recommendations of the RCIADIC.

In 2006, the six Aboriginal Legal Services located in NSW and ACT were amalgamated in response to the funding crisis initiated by the Howard government, which had abolished the Aboriginal and Torres Strait Islander Commission (ATSIC) in 2003 and instead introduced a tender process for the provision of legal aid to Aboriginal and Torres Strait Islander communities.

In 2016, one Aboriginal person died in custody in NSW; this was the first time an Aboriginal person had died in custody in NSW or the ACT since the CNS was implemented. Police failed to notify the CNS when the law did not mandate it for the case in question, rather than there being any problem with the service itself. When 36-year-old Rebecca Maher was taken into protective custody by police for being intoxicated, under the provisions of Part 16 of the Law Enforcement (Powers and Responsibilities) Act 2002, police were only obliged to call the CNS if an Indigenous person was taken into custody for an offence, not if they were detained as an intoxicated person under this Act. As a result of the coronial inquest into her death, in October 2019 the NSW government implemented a change to extend the CNS to cover police custody of intoxicated persons.

== Today ==
The ALS does legal work in criminal law, children’s care and protection law and family law. It also undertakes policy and law reform work.

The Custody Notification Service is now mandated under NSW law (cl. 37 of the Law Enforcement (Powers and Responsibilities) Regulation 2016), requiring that NSW Police officers must inform the CNS of the taking in to custody of Aboriginal and Torres Strait Islander people, but it is not as of August 2020 mandated in the ACT. The service has been successful and has since been cited as a model.

== See also ==
- Aboriginal Legal Service of Western Australia
- North Australian Aboriginal Justice Agency
