= Elma Gada Kris =

Australian dancer

Elma Gada Kris is an Australian dancer, choreographer and NAIDOC award winner. She is a Torres Strait Islander woman of the Wagadagam, Kaurareg, Sipingur, Gebbara and Kai Dangal Buai peoples, and a member of the Bangarra Dance Theatre.

== Early life and education ==
Kris was born on Thursday Island in the Torres Strait. She is a descendant of the Wagadagam, Kaurareg, Sipingur, Gebbara and Kai Dangal Buai peoples.

She attended a performing arts school on the mainland, the National Aboriginal Islander Skills Development Association (NAISDA) Dance College in Sydney.

== Career ==
Kris first danced with Bangarra Dance Theatre in 1997. She danced with the Aboriginal Islander Dance Theatre dance troupe before joining Bangarra Dance Theatre full-time in 1999, dancing with them for more than 20 years. Bangarra Dance Theatre's artistic director Stephen Page described Elma's contribution as “vital within Bangarra’s story and evolution. Over the past twenty years, she has been a unique creative collaborator, a source of wisdom and a valued friend to me. She has been instrumental in shaping and bringing Torres Strait Islander stories to the stage. I have such enormous respect for Elma – she is a rare artist and leaves an incredible cultural legacy for the next generation to carry forward."

Kris also formed her own dance group, Bibir.

== Works ==
Kris's choreographic credits include Malu (Bibir dance company, 1998), Bupau Ipikazil and Bupau Mabigal for NAISDA (1994) and components of the Sydney Olympics Opening Ceremony (2000) and Emeret Lu (Bangarra Dance Theatre, 2007).

== Awards ==
- 2019 NAIDOC Award artist of the year
- 2016 Australian Dance Award for Outstanding Performance by a Female Dancer
- 2012 Dance Australia’s Critics Survey award for Best New Work for Walkabout
- 2007 Deadly Award for Dancer of the Year

Kris has also been nominated for the Helpmann Award (2017) and an Australian Dance Award, for her role in Bennelong (2018).
