= National Black Theatre (Australia) =

Theatre company in Sydney, Australia

The National Black Theatre (NBT) was a theatre company run by a small group of Aboriginal people based in the Sydney suburb of Redfern which operated from 1972 to 1977. The original concept for the theatre grew out of political struggles, especially the land rights demonstrations, which at the time were being organised by the Black Moratorium Committee. The centre held workshops in modern dancing, tribal dancing, writing for theatre, karate and photography, and provided a venue for new Aboriginal drama. It also ran drama classes under Brian Syron, whose students included Jack Davis, Freddie Reynolds, Maureen Watson, Lillian Crombie, and Hyllus Maris.

The company ran the Black Theatre Arts and Culture Centre from 1974 to 1977.

== History ==
=== Precedents ===
Bob Maza and others got involved in community theatre in Melbourne after Maza had travelled to the United States and been impressed by political theatre being staged by African Americans and Native Americans. Along with Jack Charles, Maza co-founded the first Aboriginal theatre company, Nindethana, at the Pram Factory in 1971.

After working in the United States as a director and actor, Brian Syron returned to Sydney and held acting classes in 1969 for Indigenous actors, including Gary Foley and Denis Walker at the Foundation for Aboriginal Affairs. Paul Coe, a law student, approached Jenny Sheehan (aka Jenni(e) van de Steenhaven), a non-Aboriginal drama student, to run classes for young people in 1971. They were given a grant of A$870 to continue the workshops and play readings in February 1972.

Street theatre was organised by the Aboriginal community in Redfern by 1972 as a form of political action. Informal and formal theatrical performances were staged to raise awareness about the Aboriginal tent embassy, land rights demonstrations, and to support the establishment of a legal service.

An art workshop was involved in the printing of posters (including those for the N'ingla a-na rallies) and in ceramics, sculpture, carving, etc. The documentary Ningla A-Na (1972), directed by Alessandro Cavadini, highlighted the land rights movement and Aboriginal activism, including the theatre as examples of the growing movement for self-determination.

Carole Johnson, an African-American dancer, toured Australia with the Eleo Pomare Dance Company in February and March. They witnessed the media coverage of the tent embassy, and the attempts to remove it, and understood the human rights issues. Johnson stayed in Sydney and, with an Australia Council for the Arts grant, started a dance workshop in May, using St Luke's Church hall by the end of the year. Participants included Euphemia Bostock (born 1936, aka Phemie), her daughter Tracey, Wayne Nicol, Norma Williams (Ingram), and Elsie and Joanne Vesper. The dance workshop was documented in the short film Sharing the dream (1974), and led to the formation of NAISDA and the Aboriginal Islander Dance Theatre.

=== Beginnings ===
Coe, Foley, Sheehan, and Lester Bostock (brother of Gerry Bostock) formed a theatre group that they called the National Black Theatre, and Coe and Sheehan applied on behalf of "Black Theatre" for funding from the Australia Council for the Arts for training and to expand the drama workshops. They were refused due to their inexperience.

In mid-1972 Maza was invited to come to Sydney, to share his experience, which had included some time working and studying with the National Black Theatre of Harlem, New York City, and experience writing his own material. His "professional" status attracted the funding that was needed, and A$5,500 was granted by the Australia Council. They rented a house at 174 Regent Street, and for workshops were given use of the hall named Murawina behind a church by Wayside Chapel and the Aboriginal Women's Action Group who operated the children's breakfast program. Maza ran the workshops when Coe and Sheehan had to resume their studies.

When Johnson went to south-east Asia in September to continue her investigation of dance cultures, Phemie Bostock, assisted by Wayne Nicole, took over the co-ordination of the Dance Group. Carole proposed an Aboriginal Community Arts – Education Centre to the Aboriginal Arts Advisory Committee, encapsulating the needs and wants of the community. Social outlets, and cultural and training programs were needed in Redfern.

First performances

The first formal and publicly acknowledged performance by Black Theatre was street theatre in 1972 to publicise the Black Moratorium and the Gove land rights claim against Nabalco (now Rio-Tinto Alcan). This was broadcast nationally by This Day Tonight.

The next performance was to lead the Aboriginal land rights demonstration, held on 14 July across the country on NAIDOC Day. The Pitjantjatjara expression N'ingla-a-na, meaning "We are hungry for our land", became the rallying call.

Six days later, on 20 July, the Aboriginal Tent Embassy in Canberra had been removed. At the re-erection of the tent embassy, on 30 July 1972, the Black Theatre performed the Dance of the Embassy, also called The Challenge, which was a symbolic re-erection of the tent embassy but portrayed the whole history of Aboriginal / European conflict and gave powerful expression to the emotions of that event.

On 7 September, the dance group performed a public concert at the Friends' hall in Devonshire Street, Surry Hills. It was a presentation of class work, works in progress and students' material. The Embassy dance, called Awakening, was revised to include traditional Aboriginal movements.

Basically black

When Maza came to Sydney, he undertook an apprenticeship program for directors and actors with the Nimrod Theatre Company. In the absence of a performance space, the political revue Basically Black was performed at the Nimrod Theatre Company's Stables Theatre, directed by Ken Horler. The cast included Aileen Corpus, Gary Foley, Zac Martin, Bob Maza and Bindi Williams. The revue was a biting satire, continuing the response to the High Court ruling against a traditional claim to land ownership. Premiering 27 October, a successful season of five or six weeks ran until 3 December 1972.

The final performance coincided with a federal election and the famous ALP / Gough Whitlam victory after two decades of conservative rule. The cast, crew and audience gathered in the theatre foyer to party and watch the results of the Federal election come in on specially installed TV sets.

Also at this time, certain advertising agencies began offering work to local Aboriginal people. This interest led to the formation of Ebony Profile, a part of NBT established as a black casting agency that provided people with a grounding in advertising, television and films.

By the end of 1972 NBT, as it was known, was based at 181 Regent Street, an umbrella organisation for a range of groups.

=== 1973 ===
The Metropolitan Local Aboriginal Land Council was established at the Black Theatre in 1973, illustrating its value as a community hub.

Basically black tour and television production

Proving popular with Aboriginal people, Basically Black toured the eastern states the following year. The show was invited to the Innisfail Festival in Queensland. Trusting the assurances of funding, the Black Theatre troupe set off on tour – visits to missions and reserves considered important as there was a range of human rights issues in that state.

It was a white bus, and on the side of it had Black Theatre and Basically Black underneath it. And in those days we had a lot of looks and stares of people wondering what all these blackfellas in this bus here ... [Ted Maza, Bob Maza's nephew, was involved in the music side]

However, the promised funding from the Council for the Arts did not arrive, which put a lot of pressure on the shoestring budget. A new production had been planned for March, a musical, Millingurri. Thirteen out of the fourteen songs were original, and some were recorded. However NBT did not continue operating. Lester Bostock carried on as administrator after the tour, followed by Tony Coorey. Funds were frozen for some time.

After the cast reunited for the ABC Television production of Basically Black, at a 1993 Aboriginal Medical Service meeting Gary Foley said:

"The first black television show by the ABC, which was a version of Basically Black, had some scripts culled by non-Aboriginal scriptwriters from the original production". Foley

The foundations were laid for a broad range of initiatives that followed – the possibility of Aboriginal-initiated theatre had been opened up. What was needed next, was a performance space.

First National Seminar on Aboriginal Arts

The first National Seminar on Aboriginal Arts was held in Canberra in May 1973, sponsored by the Aboriginal Arts Board (AAB) of the Australia Council. Coe, Syron, Foley, Oodgeroo Noonuccal, her grandson Denis Walker, and other delegates discussed possibilities. A number favoured outreach work with mobile productions and workshops touring. Syron suggested a black theatre in each state, as a supplement, not a replacement, to traditional forms. A group presented a program of short sketches on topical issues.

Carole Johnson returned in November to take up a consultancy position with the Urban Theatre Committee (UTC), a sub-committee of the AAB. This meant she worked more with helping to find a building for Black theatre than with dance workshops.

For the first time, a theatre company used Aboriginal people to play Aboriginal people. Sydney Theatre Company produced The Story of Bennelong. Boddy's The Cradle of Hercules played at the Sydney Opera House Old Tote theatre.

=== 1974 ===
The Black Theatre group reformed. Originally there were no financial resources, then funding was obtained from the Department of Aboriginal Affairs and AAB to establish and manage a centre. As Casey said:

One of the major problems facing Aboriginal artists was the battle to be taken seriously as artists rather than as social issues to be supported. To this end, the Black Theatre's achievement of establishing its own performance space was an important step. The resulting exposure of their theatre work to a wider audience was another major step.

Black Theatre Arts and Culture Centre

The Black Theatre Arts and Culture Centre was established in a hall at 27-31 Cope Street (then called Botany Street), adjacent to the Methodist Church, (now Uniting Church), and lasted from 1974 until 1977.

The centre opened officially on 26 July 1974, after singer Bettie Fisher had accepted the position to run the centre. She brought attention to the theatre by inviting visiting black artists Roberta Flack and Russand Roland Kirk to the opening. She recruited Aboriginal theatre director, actor and teacher Brian Syron to work on setting it up. A huge empty former printing factory in Botany Street (later Cope Street) owned by the Methodist Church (Wesley Central Mission) was leased for A$15,000 a year with very few conveniences. The interior was repainted in cream, orange and brown, using paint donated by the local family paint company Pascol Paint. With the help of friends such as Tom Hogan and Kevin Cook from the Builders' Labourers Federation, Fisher renovated the old warehouse and developed a theatre and studio area. Architect Col James, who did much work pro bono for various Aboriginal organisations, especially the Aboriginal Housing Company , also did work for the Black Theatre.

By November 1974, it was up and running.

A theatre provided seating for 100 in a semicircle built up on scaffolding, with cushions spread across. The focus was again on training and workshops. Casey tells the story of a Koori parent leaving his child, overheard outside the centre

You go in there and get what I can't give you. Those theatre people can give it to you.

Functions included: skill development • outlet for artists and the community • theatre centre • exhibition space • exhibited the work of Aboriginal fashion designers sykes and smith Mum Shirl • drop in and meeting place for local and international visitors • focal point for the community • youth centre • starting point for Stolen Generations with the task of beginning the search for their family, at that time known as "lost generation" • bridge between non-Aboriginal producers and directors and Aboriginal actors, such as film director Peter Weir and some television producers doing casting interviews there

The first play staged at the theatre, The Chocolate Frog, was written by non-Aboriginal playwright Jim McNeil. While on the executive committee of the Foundation for Aboriginal Affairs, Bettie Fisher initiated its use as the subject of workshops conducted for inmates of Sydney prisons.

Syron and Johnson worked on a workshop program to upgrade black theatre across Australia. Johnson returned to the United States in May, but returned in 1975 committed to "get dance on solid ground".

=== 1975 ===
After sixteen months of lobbying the centre was given minimal government funding ($9200) from the Department of Aboriginal Affairs.

Dance showcase

A joint dance program with the Sydney dance group, Queensland's Yelangi Dance Company and Torres Strait Island Dancers was presented in February, and a short performance on 6 April, to introduce funding bodies to the work being done by the Black Theatre

The Cake Man

The first serious play to be produced at the centre was The Cake Man, on 12 January 1975. The play was written in 1974 by Bob Merritt from Erambie Mission, Cowra. Merritt wrote The Cake Man while he was in gaol and the play was then smuggled out of the gaol by the Prison Education Officer to the Australian National Playwrights Conference (ANPC). Katharine Brisbane and her husband Phillip Parsons, the founders of Currency Press, passed the text on to Maza. In it Merritt expressed what he believed was at the root of Aboriginal despair.

"It is a poignant fragment of latter day mythology and a powerful Australian play which traces white man's devastation of Blacks over the 200 years to 1974" [Brian Syron]

"about a Bible-loving mother and an alcoholic father, and how a small boy's innocent faith transforms the life of a white Scrooge. But the identification with the characters which the cast immediately made gave the performed work a compelling emotional drive." [Brisbane.]

The play was directed by Maza. It was mainly cast in the Redfern community and starred Justine Saunders, Zac Martin, Teddy Phillips and an eight-year-old Lisa Maza, plus non-Aboriginal actors Max Cullen and Danny Adcock. Gerry Bostock tells how, during the performance of one scene in which a group is set upon by two white thugs, visitors from Elcho Island became incensed and tried to climb on to the stage to offer their assistance, yelling "I'll help ya, brother!".

After initial refusal, Merritt was finally permitted to attend opening night under guard. The cast refused to go on stage until the handcuffs were removed. Lisa Maza presented him with a cake at the end. The play was a huge success with large Koori audiences attending. Casey stresses what an important milestone it was – the first completely Aboriginal-written, initiated, controlled, full-length, professional, recognised production.

After this success, NBT continued to expand, receiving a grant for A$86,000 in June 1975.

Six-week training program

The first national performing arts training for Aboriginal people had a profound effect, on the participants, and as a catalyst for performing arts in Sydney. Syron and Johnson, as members of the UTC, devised a continuing training scheme – to nurture new interests and new ideas, increase visibility and participation, and demonstrate the need for a permanent course or school. It was funded by the Commonwealth Department of Education and the Aboriginal Arts Board, and supported by the Black Theatre.

28 students were selected nationally through mini-workshops held in the capital cities; Brisbane and Melbourne (Adelaide postponed). This "travelling theatre" would also build networks. Syron taught drama, Johnson and Nicol taught dance, Ande Reese (aka Ande Evan Maddox) taught writing, and Tom Rosser taught karate. The intensive six-week course took place at the Black Theatre in Redfern in June and July. Students included Maureen Watson, Jack Davis, Lillian Crombie, Andrew Jackamos, Hylus Maris, Wayne Nicol, Christine Donnelly, Aileen Corpus, Zac Martin, John Bayles, Lorraine Mafi.

On the last night, the group staged plays and dances they had written or choreographed. Over 300 people came from all over the country with no advertising.

Syron met with Carole Johnson and Ande Reese to discuss the production of a film record of The Six Weeks Workshop because he believed that history was being made by all those involved and they needed to record the historic events to realise their value. Reese, like Johnson, was an African American residing in Sydney, with experience in film and television production in the United States. She had been a screenwriting fellow at the American Film Institute, so she began work on a film (which would be completed in 1976).

Outcomes

After the six-week training program, people could, for the first time, see possibility of employment.

Members of the dance group requested more specialised training, and a Careers in Dance course commenced in October. It moved to Bodenweiser Dance Studio in Chippendale, the breakaway causing some grief in the Redfern community. This was the forerunner of the Aboriginal Islander Skills Development Scheme (AISDS), which evolved into the National Aboriginal and Islander Skills Development Association (NAISDA) and the Aboriginal Islander Dance Theatre (AIDT), and the offshoot Bangarra Dance Theatre in 1989.

Christine Donnelly applied for a grant to continue dance workshops at the Centre, but was initially refused.

In August, Johnson and Syron were terminated as consultants to the Aboriginal Arts Board (Urban dance and Urban Theatre), the only consultants for the UTC with experience in the performing arts. (Chicka Dixon was a member who became increasingly active.)

While the dance group focused on further education, the drama group saw most of its students gain work. Many excelled in other areas of the performing arts as well. Yvette Isaacs was awarded a Conservatorium of Music scholarship. Known now as Maroochy Barambah, a successful musician, she has performed in leading roles and established a recording and publishing company Daki Budtcha. Jack Davis developed as a playwright, Cheryl Stone became a booking agent, Maureen Watson became a well-known storyteller and started Radio Redfern. Christine Donnelly founded the Aboriginal Dance Theatre Redfern (ADTR) in 1979 to serve the Redfern community. Lucy Jumawan has worked there for many years as a senior dance teacher.

Performances Jack Davis presented for a performance his second one-act play, The Biter Bit.

Bettie Fisher continued to invite touring international black artists to perform at the Black Theatre. Despite resistance by a number of non-Aboriginal entertainment managers, visitors included the band, Osibisa, and the Ghanaian drummers.

=== 1976 ===
A subscription season was planned of "black plays by black artists" including works by Gerry Bostock, Wole Soyinka, Ione elder and Archie Shepp. Black Theatre Arts and Cultural Centre's director Bettie Fisher died of coronary arteriosclerosis on 12 May 1976, still in her thirties, and the company struggled to secure funding after this.

Funding withdrawn A proposed grant from the Federal government of $86,000 for the 76–77 financial year was withdrawn in June 1976. (Dance and drama were funded separately.) The Board (under the new Liberal government) didn't support the organisation, and was critical of Lester Bostock's appointment as Fisher's replacement. Ironically the Board was planning to spend $197,000 to send 30 Aboriginal performers to Nigeria to take part in the second World Black and African Festival of Arts and Culture.

Marcia Langton believed that the difficulties faced by the black theatre in this period occurred because their work challenged the "accepted" expectations of Aboriginal people. Justine Saunders agreed – "challenging stereotypes, presenting real human beings dealing with conflict".

Here comes the nigger To deal with the financial crisis a fundraising committee was established. The company used their limited resources to produce the play Here Comes the Nigger, written by Gerry Bostock, in 1976. This was the final production at the Redfern Black Theatre and Cultural Centre in 1976. It was directed by Jack Charles, then Bob Maza, who withdrew for other commitments. It then became a cooperative affair with Gerry Bostock and Bryan Brown directing with the cast. The cast included Athol Compton, Kevin Stuart (Smith), Julie McGregor, Marcia Langton, Bryan Brown, Robert Hensley, John Bayles, Ron Murray, Lorraine Mafi Williams and Venieca Doolan. Langton, for example, was running the box office as a volunteer for NAISDA student performances at the centre, in between working for the Aboriginal Medical Service around the corner. This was the first occasion a profile was achieved outside the urban Aboriginal communities. The play was successful – they were starting to draw in a wider audience, often first-time visitors to Redfern, which helped to start to break down the barriers. However, despite its success, funding was cut in the 1976–1977 financial year, and the centre was forced to close in 1977.

Film: Tjintu Pakani – Sunrise awakening

Syron noted in Kicking Down the Doors that Tjinto-Pakani: Sunrise Awakening was completed, including footage of the first professional performance by Black Theatre's dance group under the direction of Johnson in 1976. The film won first prize in the Greater Union Awards, documentary category, at the Sydney Film Festival in May that year. It also screened in Paris at L'Homme Regarde L'Homme, the Museum of Modern Art in New York, and had a private screening at Universal Studios in Hollywood. A half-hour version was televised by ABC Television

One of the items was the Embassy dance, performed this time with traditional movements.

In an interview with Reese for a paper entitled "The Australian Film Commission" written in September 1977, Reese said that when she made Sunrise Awakening

Aborigines wanted to know why they couldn't make their own films about themselves and how and what they were doing. They asked why films about Aborigines were invariably made by the white middle class

As Syron commented in his book Kicking down the doors, "We would ask that question for many years to come."

=== 1977 ===
ABC TV made a television production of the play The Cake Man in 1977, making it the first telemovie to be written by an Aboriginal playwright (Bob Merritt – see above). After its success, Merritt then tried to put on another stage production of the play with the director George Ogilvie who liked the play but saw it as a fresh challenge. The production opened at the Bondi Pavilion, Bondi Beach in Sydney on 30 April 1977 under Ogilvie's direction and starring Justine Saunders with Zac Martin and Brian Syron. It was the first Aboriginal play to enter the repertoire of the European Australian mainstream theatre. Syron's and Saunder's performances were both highly acclaimed.

Prime Minister Malcolm Fraser announced that cultural activities involving Aboriginal people would no longer be helped by the Department of Aboriginal Affairs, but would become the responsibility of the Australia Council. No funds were granted to the Council for its additional responsibilities. Lester Bostock recalled that the Theatre had applied to the department and to the Australia Council for assistance but had received no reply. Lack of funding had become an enormous strain on the Theatre, and all involved. As Langton explained:

With no grants for over a year, the burden of supporting the centre plus making a living burnt people out .

By the end of 1977, the Black Theatre had closed.

=== 1990/1: building demolition ===
The building was eventually demolished in 1990 or 1991, along with the adjacent Radio Redfern building at 27 Cope Street.

== Offshoots and developments ==
In 1979 Christine Donnelly, a participant in the six-week program, founded the Aboriginal Dance Theatre to serve the Redfern community. It was situated next to the Black Theatre site.

In 1980 Bostock and Bryan Brown received script development funding from the Australian Film Commission for a documentary to be made from Bostock's script Here Comes the Nigger.

In 1982 The Cake Man (by Bob Merritt – see above) starring Justine Saunders, Graham Moore and Syron, and directed by Syron, was invited to the World Theatre Festival in Denver, Colorado, and played to packed houses, receiving widespread acclaim.

Merritt went on to become the first Aboriginal screenwriter to co-write a feature film, originally entitled Running Man and released in the UK as The City's Edge (1983) and the first Indigenous screenwriter of feature film Short Changed (1986).

In 1984 Merritt set up the Eora Centre for the visual and performing arts in Redfern, offering young Aboriginal people a comprehensive education. He was a consultant producer on a documentary film about it, Eora Corroboree (1985), the first in a series of documentaries called Black Futures. David Gulpilil contributed to the soundtrack.

In 1987 the First National Black Playwrights' Conference was held under the artistic directorship of Brian Syron, thanks to a push from people like Chicka Dixon, Gary Foley and Rhoda Roberts.

The Aboriginal National Theatre Trust was established in Sydney in the mid-1980s.

In 1988 Carole Johnson was a foundation member and first director of the National Aboriginal and Islander Skills Development Association (NAISDA). She played a major role in the training of Aboriginal and Islander dancers and actors in movement, dance and choreography. NAISDA is based on an idea of Johnson's, where young people would be taught traditional dance from their Aboriginal and Torres Strait Islander elders while also studying a modern dance technique.

Johnson also played a pivotal role in the establishment in 1989 of the Bangarra Dance Theatre. She was founder and foundation member of the theatre which began in the Police Boys Club, Pitt Street, Redfern. The Bangarra Dance Theatre performed their first professional performance in 1990 in Brian Syron's feature film Jindalee Lady, the first feature film to be directed by an Indigenous Australian.

== Impact and legacy ==
Aboriginal Dance Theatre Redfern (1979), NAISDA Dance College, Bangarra Dance Theatre, and Boomalli Aboriginal Artists Cooperative were all born out of Black Theatre, as were the careers of Bob Maza and many others.

The ABC Radio National program Hindsight summarised:

Black Theatre had a profound impact on the Australian arts scene of today. It was also the place where many well known Aboriginal performers got their break. And its legacy is still apparent in today's arts scene.

It was also true that

The centre also functioned as an informal meeting-place for Redfern Blacks who previously had few places in which to gather, save for the local pubs where they encountered prejudice from the Whites and aggression from the police.

Bettie Fisher:

The centre for me is my blood, my guts, my heart and my soul, for my people and their culture. I'm a very emotional person as far as this centre is concerned. Because there is a helluva need for it.

Gerry Bostock:

It was a major step in breaking down barriers, as for many people attending Black Theatre, it was their first visit to Redfern.

Lester Bostock:

Its whole emphasis was to put the points across to its own community. That was the first step. By the people, for the people. All those other things that happened are secondary.

Black Theatre is no longer in Redfern, but in a spiritual sense, as a philosophy of an ideal, it's still alive. The dreams and aspirations of those people are still carried on. When you see people like the Page boys, and you see programs like ICAM, and all these other things, those ideals are still there. The people are still called by the community the Black Theatre people. Even though it's an empty lot now, it's still called the Black Theatre site.

It developed a state of mind and it was also a focus of energy, because it became part of Redfern, where the Kooris and Murries knew their grass roots and knew their artistic endeavours. Many individuals have gone onto radio, television, dance or drama and now contemporary Aboriginal culture is recognised throughout the world.

Kevin Smith:

It inspired a confidence in the community, that things could be done, and a message could be given. Black Theatre itself was a message stick. It was also a refuge, a smart option, a vehicle and a place [to go] without being harassed by police and police dogs, being set upon and attacked and then having a criminal record.

Marcia Langton:

It was very much a community centre. During rehearsals lots of people would come to watch how things were done in the theatre. It was one of those periods when a group of people with amazing backgrounds came together, Maza, Foley, Merritt and Syron, and it worked. It was a hothouse.

Justine Saunders:

It gave the possibility of life... It was wonderful. .. the best thing I ever did, it fine-tuned me. It gave the chance to touch base with my culture. It was a blessing to a people.

== Moving on ==
=== The future of the site ===
The Black Theatre building was handed over to the Redfern Aboriginal community, to a group called the Organisation for Aboriginal Unity (OAU), after its closure as a theatre. The OAU consisted of members of all of the existing organisations and individuals at the time of forming (1975). The OAU and Charles Perkins wanted the site to be developed as a cultural centre for the Redfern community, but there were never any funds to redevelop the site. It then became a squat. As there are organisations that exist now that didn't exist then, Wyanga (next door) being one and the Local Land Council another, the Aboriginal community established another organisation called the Redfern Aboriginal Authority, reforming late in 2004 following suggestions that the NSW Government planned to forcibly acquire land owned by Aboriginal people in Redfern's Block. When ATSIC was abolished in 2005, the Indigenous Land Corporation (ILC) took over the overseeing of the site, redeveloping it in 2008, liaising with Sol Bellear, Redfern Aboriginal Authority's CEO. The ILC sought expressions of interest from Aboriginal businesses and organisations in the arts, multimedia, retail and/or hospitality. Koori Radio moved in and set up a recording studio.

=== The future of black theatre ===
In 1986, Brian Syron, on behalf of the Australia Council's Aboriginal Arts Board, published a "Questionnaire seeking support for establishment of National Aboriginal Theatre Company", ahead of a National Black Playwrights Workshop at James Cook University in Townsville.

In 2007 a new black theatre group formed in Redfern: Moogahlin Performing Arts was formed in November 2007 by a group of Indigenous theatre artists, educators and community workers in honour of Kevin Smith's request and in memory of the founding members of the Black Theatre.

In 2012 The Black Theatre's origins were commemorated in the Sydney Festival's Black Capital program.

== See also ==
- Nindethana Theatre, Melbourne, Australia's first Aboriginal theatre company
