= Janet Munyarryun =

Aboriginal dancer, choreographer and tutor

Guypunura "Janet" Munyarryun (born c. 1960s) is an Australian Aboriginal dancer and choreographer who is a founding member of the Bangarra Dance Theatre.

== Biography ==
Munyarryun was born in Yirrkala, a community in Arnhem Land, Northern Territory. She grew up in the Garthalala homeland, and as a young girl she travelled with her family across country to establish the community of Dhalinybuy. She is a Yolngu woman of the Wangnurri clan.

In 1984, she started working at National Aboriginal and Islander Skills Development Association (NAISDA) Dance College in Sydney, and started cultural workshops to bring traditional dance practices to urban students. She also helped establish the Aboriginal & Torres Strait Islander Dance Theatre (AIDT), contributing as a choreographer and tutor.

In 1989, Bangarra Dance Theatre was formed after NAISDA director Carole Johnson left the organisation, and Munyarryun contributed as a founding member.

She had two children, Rarriwuy and Guruguru, to Paul Hick, an English-born dancer. They separated when Rarriwuy was young.

Rarriwuy remarked of her mother: "[she] was dancing at Bangarra when she was pregnant with me and she took me to all the rehearsals and performances after I was born".

Munyarryun has continued as the cultural advisor for Bangarra, ensuring that their "performances adhere to the traditional stories and songs of her people". She has also worked as an advisor to the Australian Ballet.

In May 2012, Munyarryun performed with an Aboriginal dance troupe at Windsor Castle, England, for celebrations of Queen Elizabeth II's Diamond Jubilee. She also worked to establish the Bunggul Djama Arts Alliance, a community-driven initiative to foster Yolngu performance arts and mixed-media projects.

In 2013, Munyarryun worked on and performed in the dance production The Morning Star. The production travelled between Arnhem Land and Mirramu Creative Arts Centre near Lake George in Bungendore, NSW.

== Theatre ==
- 1997-1999 – Fish, Bangarra Dance Theatre
- 2012 – Infinity: Warumuk − in the dark night, vocalist, Bangarra Dance Theatre
- 2013 – The Morning Star

== Awards ==
- 2012 – Dancer of the Year, Deadly Awards

== Personal life ==
She has a younger brother Djakapurra Munyarryun, a performance artist and dancer, and who was also a founding member of the Bangarra Dance Theatre.

Her children are Rarriwuy Hick, an actress and dancer, and Guruguru Hick, rap artist.
