= Lillian Crombie =

Indigenous Australian actress (1958–2024)

- Born: 1958
- Died: 3 January 2024 (aged 66)
- Education: Alvin Ailey American Dance Theater, National Institute of Dramatic Art
- Occupations: Actress, dancer
- Years active: 1977–2024
- Children: Elaine Crombie

Lillian Crombie (1958 – 3 January 2024), also known as "Aunty Lillian", was an Aboriginal Australian actress and dancer, known for her work on stage, film and television.

== Early life and education ==
Lillian Crombie was born in 1958. She was of the Pitjantjatjara / Yankunytjatjara people of central Australia, but was taken from her parents at the age of seven and never saw them again. She grew up in a loving home with foster parents in Port Pirie, South Australia.

Crombie trained in classical ballet at the Port Pirie Ballet School, before winning a scholarship to Dance Concert Limited in Sydney, which started at the beginning of 1975, when she was 16. There she learnt and performed various cultural dances, such as the maypole dance, and in that year also did a dance and drama course at the National Black Theatre in Redfern. She then joined National Aboriginal and Islander Skills Development Association (NAISDA) as one of their first intake of students in 1976, and joined the performance arm of the organisation, the Aboriginal Islander Dance Theatre (AIDT) soon afterwards.

Crombie then applied for and won a scholarship via Department of Employment, Education and Training (DEET) and the Australia Council to go to the Alvin Ailey American Dance Theater in New York City. She also trained at the National Institute of Dramatic Art (NIDA), after being invited by Keith Bain, and the Eora Centre. She learnt modern dance, jazz ballet and traditional Aboriginal and Torres Strait Islander dance.

== Career ==
=== Dance ===
Crombie toured with AIDT on its first international tour to Nigeria, (FESTAC 77) in 1977, along with Wayne Nicol, Michael Leslie, Richard Talonga, and Roslyn Watson.

Working with Stephen Page, she had some fun doing mixed drag acts, and in the 1980s joined the Sydney Mardi Gras to support the gay community during the AIDS pandemic. Working with David Page, she performed at some fund-raising events for HIV/AIDS.

In 1988, she was one of a four-woman dance troupe who called themselves the African Dance Group and performed a show directed by Robyn Archer at The Space Theatre in the Adelaide Festival Centre for the Adelaide Festival of Arts, entitled AKWANSO (Fly South). The others in the group were Ghanaian-Australian Dorinda Hafner, African-American dancer and choreographer Aku Kadogo, and Jamaican Jigzie Campbell. Each woman tells her own story of racial prejudice, which is followed by a dance by all four women, choreographed by Mary Barnett of the Alvin Ailey American Dance Theater.

=== Stage ===
Crombie's theatre credits include many productions with Company B at the Belvoir Street Theatre (Conversations with The Dead, Black Mary) and the Sydney Theatre Company, and she featured in Bangarra Dance Theatre's Clan and Riverside's Rainbow's End.

She also had lead roles in Mereki the Peacemaker, Gunjies, Capricornia, and The Cherry Pickers.

=== Film and television ===
Crombie had her first outing on screen in the ABC Television series Heartland, along with her close colleague from acting school, Rachael Maza. The series also featured Cate Blanchett, in her first screen role.

Crombie was a co host of the television show Blackout.

Having met film director Baz Luhrmann at NIDA in 1983, she applied for and won a role in his 2008 film Australia.

She also starred in the TV series The Secret Life of Us and Mystery Road, and the feature film Lucky Miles.

== Other activities ==
Following the death of her brother, in 2015 Crombie founded The Lillian Crombie Foundation (TLCF), which supports people who need to travel for "Sorry Business" (for funerals, grieving and healing purposes). It provides financial and emotional support and culturally-appropriate respect and care. She says the spark was provided by the plight of a friend ten years earlier, who could not afford to travel home to Western Australia to attend the funeral of her mother, and no charities were able to help.

In October 2020, Crombie established a series of dance workshops for children in Port Pirie, in preparation for her planned establishment of the Lillian Crombie School of Dance and Drama. The workshops included tuition in classical ballet, hip hop, Aboriginal and Torres Strait Islander dance, and drama. She said in a 2020 interview:

I really want them to have the same experience as I have and I want the kids to if they do love whatever they do, be a fireman, dancer, policeman, whatever... You just don't give up on your love because it's your life. You know it's about living it. It's about experiencing it ... and I think that's why when I went to NIDA that brought the acting out of me more. I honed it and owned it and with dancing, I danced it, dancing gave me that.

As of December 2021, she was intending to create a documentary film and book about her life.

== Recognition ==
In 2019, Crombie shared the Equity Foundation's Lifetime Achievement Award with Ningali Lawford-Wolf. Wesley Enoch described her as "a pioneer of Australian Theatre who has paved the way for many Indigenous stories to be told".

She was referred to with love and respect as "Aunty Lillian" in her later years.

== Personal life ==
Crombie was a survivor of the Stolen Generations, and the mother of actor Elaine Crombie, her child with rugby league player Sam Backo.

She was a fan of the Sydney Swans Australian rules football club, and founded their First Nations supporters club, the Black Swans. After her death, they published a tribute to her.

A 2019 short television documentary in a series called Deadly Family Portraits, called Crombie Crew, focused on Lillian and her daughter Elaine. As of December 2021, the film is available on ABC iview.

== Death and legacy ==
Crombie had health issues and had to have kidney dialysis. She died on 3 January 2024, at the age of 66.

In an interview shortly after her death, Wesley Enoch (who had worked with her a lot) and her longtime friend and colleague Rachael Maza (who entered the industry at the same time as Crombie) spoke of her huge achievements and contributions to the industry. They talked of her talent for comedy as well as showing pathos.

== Filmography ==
=== Film ===
Year	Title	Role	Notes
1977	Journey Among Women	Kameragul	
1980	Buckley's Chance	Aboriginal wife	Short film
1987	The Place at the Coast	Mrs. Lundy	
1990	Plead Guilty, Get a Bond		Short film
1991	Deadly	Sally	
1992	Jindalee Lady	Dresser	
1995	From Sand to Celluloid: Round Up	Street Lady	Short film
2004	Queen of Hearts		Short film
2005	The Djarn Djarns	Cowboy Woman	Short film
2005	Bad Habits	Hazel	Short film
2007	Lucky Miles	Evie	
2007	September	Gran Parker	
2007	Days Like These	Mum	TV movie
2008	Australia	Bandy Legs	
2009	Good Catch	Charlotte Burns	Video
2012	Grandma	Grandma	Short film
2013	Mystery Road	Mrs MacDonald	
2013	Around the Block	Aunty Rose	

=== Television ===
Year	Title	Role	Notes
1984	Mail Order Bride	Aboriginal woman	TV movie
1990	Ring of Scorpio	Aboriginal woman	Miniseries, 4 episodes
1991	Act of Necessity	Yvonne	TV movie
1994	Heartland	Mary Dyer	4 episodes
2003	The Secret Life of Us	Lani Watson	3 episodes
2007	Days Like These	Mum	TV movie
2008	Double Trouble	Milly	13 episodes
2023	Faraway Downs	Bandy Legs	6 episodes

== Theatre ==
Year	Title	Role	Notes	Ref
1984	Mereki the Peacemaker		Toe Truck Theatre	
1988	Fly South (Akwanso)	Lillian	Space Theatre, Adelaide for Adelaide Festival of Arts	
1993	Gunjies		Belvoir, Sydney	
1995	Sydney Stories 2: The Blessing / Two Wongs / In the Club / The Way I Was		Wharf Theatre, Sydney with STC for Sydney Festival	
1997	Up the Road	Aunt Sissy	Merlyn Theatre, Melbourne with Playbox Theatre Company & Belvoir	
1997	Black Mary		Belvoir, Sydney for Festival of Dreaming	
1999	Dance Clan 2: Minymaku Inma / Munikghay	Guest artist	Bangarra Dance Theatre	
2002	The Cherry Pickers	Subina	Northcott Theatre, Exeter, Lakeside Arts Centre, Nottingham with UK Arts International, The Library Theatre Company, Manchester & STC	
2003	Conversations with the Dead		Belvoir, Sydney	
2006	Capricornia	Various roles	Seymour Centre, Sydney with Belvoir, Sydney	
2009	The Man from Mukinupin	Miss Clarry Hummer	Belvoir, Sydney	
2009; 2011	Rainbow's End	Nan Dear	Riverside Theatres Parramatta, Illawarra Performing Arts Centre, Wollongong	
	Black-ed Up		STC	
	La Dispute		STC	
