= Frances Rings =

Aboriginal Australian dancer, choreographer and former television presenter

- Born: Frances Rings; Adelaide, South Australia
- Education: Bundamba State Secondary College; National Aboriginal Islander Skills Development Association
- Occupations: Choreographer; Dancer
- Career
- Current group: Bangarra Dance Theatre

Frances Rings is an Aboriginal Australian dancer, choreographer and former television presenter. She was born in Adelaide, South Australia, and is a Wirangu and Mirning woman. She became artistic director for Bangarra Dance Theatre in 2023.

== Early life and education ==
Frances Rings was born in Adelaide, South Australia. She is a descendant of the Wirangu and Mirning Tribes from the West Coast of South Australia. She has a younger sister Gina, who is a dancer and choreographer. Rings’ parents divorced when she was three years old, and Rings went to live with her father, while her mother continued living on the west coast of South Australia. Her father was a railway worker in Port Augusta, where she partially grew up. From that time Rings’ and her father started to move around Australia frequently. For his work, her father was transferred to Kalgoorlie, and then they eventually went on to move to Albany in Western Australia, and then to Queensland because of the climate there.

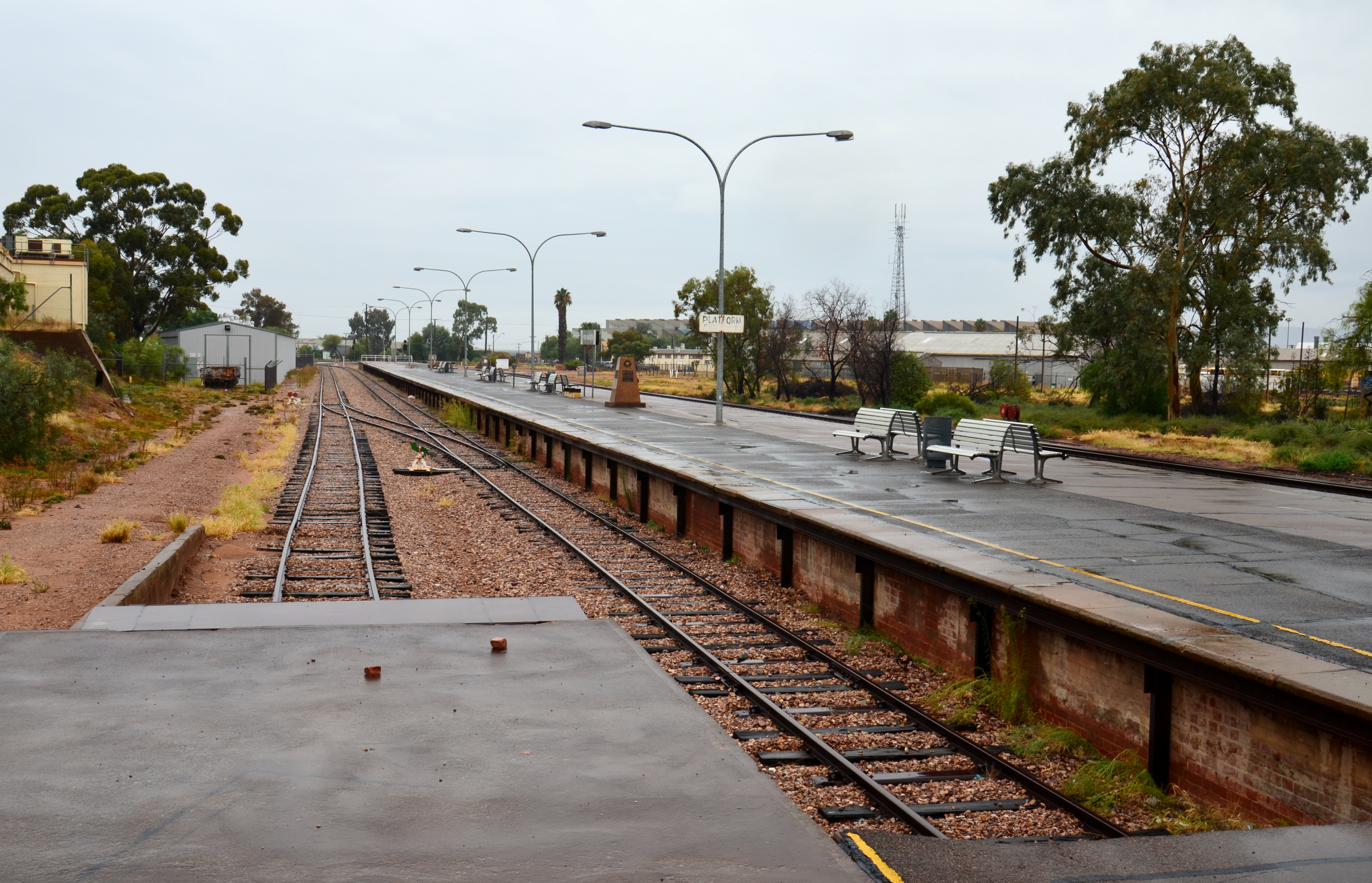
Port Augusta railway station

Growing up in Port Augusta during her early childhood, Rings had voiced an interest in dance, but her family was unable to afford to pay for ballet lessons. She continued to show her passion for dance as she created a theatre in her backyard out of water tanks, which she turned into a cubby house and decorated with curtains, as well as dressing up her siblings in costumes which she made out of bits of materials that were available to her. She would often stage mini productions with her siblings in her makeshift theatre.

At the age of 16, Rings was living in Ipswich, Queensland, where she attended a boarding school. In year 11, when pursuing her Higher School Certificate, dance was offered as a HSC course. Rings decided to sign up for HSC dance as one of her electives. She said that she had an encouraging dance teacher who pushed her to do her best.

When Rings was 17, her speech and drama teacher at school told her about the National Aboriginal and Islander Skills Development Association (NAISDA) in Sydney, where Indigenous students are given the opportunity to learn about dance and culture. Her teacher encouraged her to apply to NAISDA. After completing Year 12, Rings left Ipswich to attend NAISDA in Sydney.

== Career ==
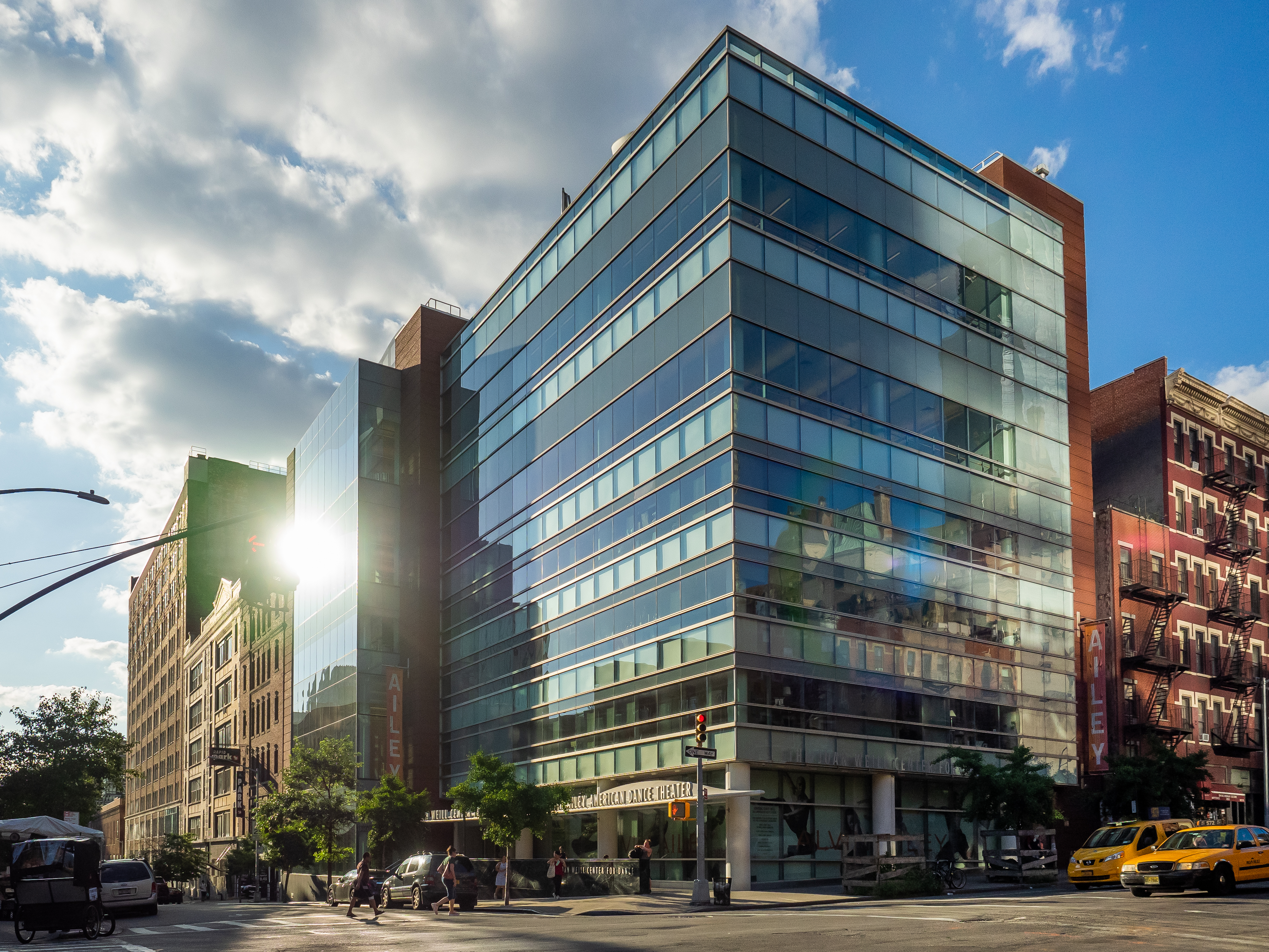
Alvin Ailey American Dance Theatre in New York City

In 1992, Rings graduated from NAISDA. she performed in her graduation performance where Stephen Page, artistic director of the Bangarra Dance Theatre, saw her, and invited her to join Bangarra. In 1993, Rings joined Bangarra to develop her skills as a choreographer. She also performed in Page's production of Praying Mantis Dreaming, Ninni, and Ochres. She became the first choreographic Artist in Residence for Bangarra. In 1995, Rings went to New York on an Australia Council grant, to study at the Alvin Ailey American Dance Theater for three months.

In 2002, Rings made her mainstage choreographic debut with the choreographic production, Rations. She went on to create six more works for Bangarra, including Bush (2003), Unaipon (2004), X300 (2007), Artefact (2010), Terrain (2012), and Sheoak (2015).

Within Australia, Rings has choreographed works for leading dance companies, including the West Australian Ballet, Tasdance and performed for Legs on the Wall theatre company in Sydney. She has also danced in works by leading Australian choreographers like Meryl Tankard and Leigh Warren. Internationally, she has worked with companies like Kahawi Dance Theatre in Six Nations, Turtle Islands (Canada), as well as Atamira Dance Company in Auckland, New Zealand, where she was a guest collaborator and performer for their production of MITIMITI. In 2018, she choreographed a new piece for Atamira called Kotahi.

In 2016, Rings returned to NAISDA as head of creative studies until 2019. Within this period, she directed five end-of-year productions, including Your Skin, My Skin (2014), Kamu (2015), From Sand to Stage (2016), Restoration (2017), and Story Place (2018). After leaving NAISDA, she returned to Bangarra as the associate artistic director in 2019.

On 2 December 2021 it was announced that Rings would take over the role of artistic director from Stephen Page in Bangarra in 2023.

== Influences ==
Rings' earliest memory of dance is watching Young Talent Time (1971–1988), an Australian variety show on television which inspired her to become a dancer. During high school, Rings' dance class was taken on a trip to Sydney to watch a live performance of Cats the musical at the Theatre Royal. Rings remembers being fascinated by the way dancers were able to move their bodies and stated she did not know dancers could use their bodies to create such movements.

Her first dance hero was Michael Jackson, before discovering NAISDA and then Alvin Ailey, whose work greatly influenced her dancing and choreography after her time spent in his studios.

== Choreographic works ==
Rings' choreographic works are often influenced by her childhood experiences with nature. During her childhood, her father, a German migrant to Australia, struggled financially to provide for his family due to the aftermath of World War II. The main source of sustenance that he could provide for his family included what he grew in his own vegetable patch and orchard. Rings also recalls how on the way to school in the morning, she would climb over other people's fences to pick figs, nuts and grapes. She believes that because of her father, Rings developed her "connection to country". It was not because of her Aboriginal background, or from a cultural perspective.

Rings mentions being influenced by the way her aunts and sisters told stories, specifically their body language, such as gestures and expressions, and how she is able to see them reflected within the shape of trees. She said in 2022 that she likes choreography that shows "clean shapes and distinctive physical architecture of body", that also embodies the convergence of the spirits of culture, Country and people.

=== Unaipon (2004) ===
Unaipon (2004) was Rings' third work for Bangarra. It was a celebration of the life of Ngarrindjeri author and inventor David Unaipon (1872–1967), with the work comprising three sections: "Ngarrindjeri", "Science", and "Religion". Each section related to different aspects of Unaipon's life and work, with the whole work bringing an interconnected story to the stage. Rings saw this as a way of bringing Indigenous stories, which had often been ignored in school curricula, to a wider audience, of bringing them into the mainstream.

=== Terrain (2012 and 2022) ===
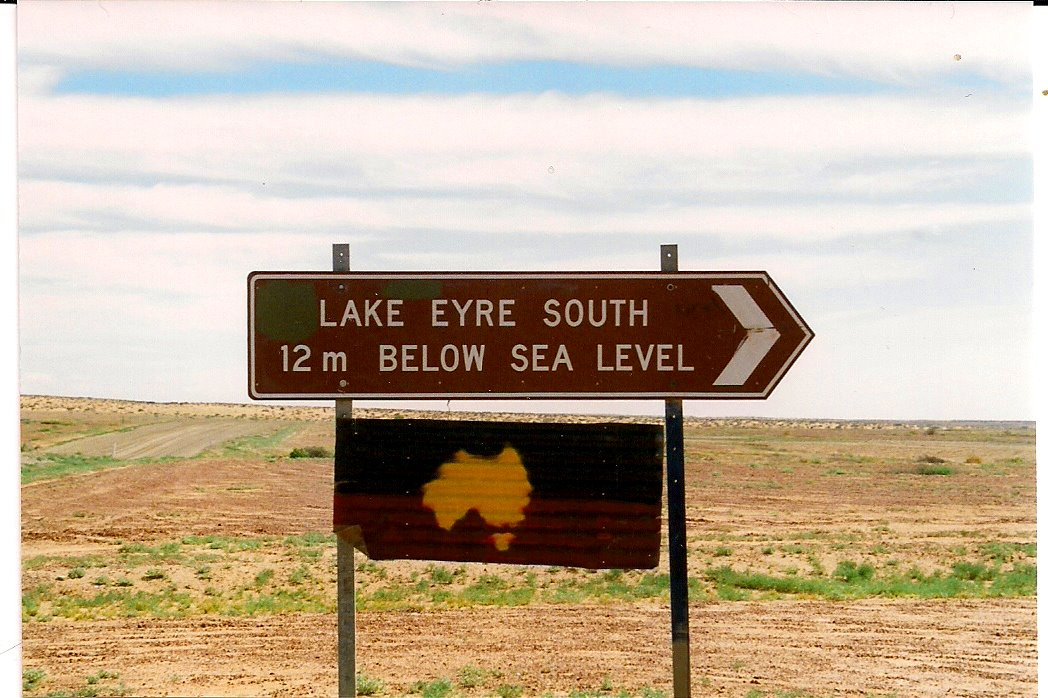
Lake Eyre Sign Post

Stephen Page asked Rings to choreograph a work depicting Aboriginal views on landscape. She cites her trips to Flinders Ranges, which she used to visit every weekend as a child, and also Kati Thanda–Lake Eyre as her main influence to choreograph a piece that illustrates how geographical features influences people's mood and spirit. She wanted to incorporate imagery of Lake Eyre that she had witnessed during her visit. She states how on the first day of her trip to the lake, it was filled with water, but the next day it was empty and shiny. She also took a tour with an Arabana elder, who showed her around waterholes and sacred sites. She had access to stone tools and ancient paintings that mapped secret waterways. Rings was influenced by literal ideas of elements that make up the physical landscape of the lake, and explored figurative ideas of human connections to land and nature which she incorporated into her work, Terrain in 2012.

Rings re-staged Terrain in 2022, with the show touring Sydney, Canberra and Brisbane from June to August.

=== Sheoak (2015) ===
When choreographing Sheoak, Rings was influenced by sheoak trees and how it is used by people to provide medicine, shelter and food amongst other purposes. Through symbolism, Through the choreography, Rings wanted to create a connection between the sheoak trees and Indigenous stories, focusing on how like sheoak trees, Indigenous languages, customs and knowledge are endangered.

== Television ==
Rings has starred in the drama film The Widower (2004).

== Other roles ==
As of 2005 Rings was a member of the Dance Board of the Australia Council.

== Awards ==
Year	Award(s)	Category	Recipient/Nominated Work	Result
2003	Helpmann Award	Best Ballet or Dance Work	Frances Rings Walkabout	Won
2003	Deadly Award	Female Dancer of the Year	Frances Rings	Won
2004	Australian Dance Award	Outstanding Achievement in Choreography	Frances Rings Unaipon	Won
2010	Helpmann Award	Best Regional Touring Production	Frances Rings True Stories	Won
2011	Green Room Award		Frances Rings Artefact	Won
2013	Helpmann Award	Best Ballet or Dance Work	Frances Rings Terrain	Won
2016	Helpmann Award	Best Ballet or Dance Work & Best Choreograph in a Dance or Physical Theatre Work	Frances Rings Sheoak	Won
2017	Helpmann Award	Best Regional Touring Show	Frances Rings Terrain	Won
