= Michael Leslie =

Michael Leslie may refer to:

- Michael Leslie (snooker player)
- Michael Leslie (dancer)

== See also ==
- Michael Lesslie, British playwright, screenwriter and producer
