= Sharing the Dream =

- Directed by: Milena Damyanovic
- Produced by: Milena Damyanovic
- Release date: 1974
- Country: Australia
- Language: English

Sharing the Dream is a 1974 short 16mm film which recorded the Black Theatre dance workshops in Redfern in 1973 taught by African American dancer Carole Y. Johnson.

Milena Damyanovic (also spelt Damjanovic) produced and directed the film. The executive producer was Caroline Jones. The film was released in 1974 and premiered at the 1975 International Women's Film Festival, the first of its kind in Australia and a one-off event. Initiated by the Sydney Women's Film Group, IWFF events were held in capital cities around the country.

Other dancers included Euphemia ("Phemie") Bostock, Wayne Nicol, and later Lucy Jumawan.
