= Ismay Andrews =

American actress

Ismay Andrews was one of the earliest major teachers of African dance in the United States. Her career started in 1929 as a stage actress, and she taught dance in community centers in New York City from 1934 to 1959.

== Stage actor ==
Andrews began her career in as an actor in stage plays in New York City. These included a musical comedy, Great Day, at the Cosmopolitan Theatre in 1929, Ol' Man Satan in 1932, and the operetta Africana in 1934. She also appeared in a 1932 film, The Black King.

== Dance ==
In the early 1930s, Andrews studied dance under Asadata Dafora. People in the United States in this era largely regarded Africans as savage and animalistic, and Dafora was part of bringing an awareness of their humanity and an appreciation for their culture. The new interest in African music and dance offered a new positive black identity rooted in ancient, pre-colonial traditions. This movement in art and culture was connected to the Harlem Renaissance and the Négritude movement.

Andrews taught in New York community centers from 1934 to 1959. She began teaching African dance at the Abyssinian Baptist Church in Harlem in 1934. This makes her one of the earliest major teachers of African dance in the United States, along with Efiom Odok and Dafora. She also taught at Mother African Methodist Episcopal Zion Church, which was one of the primary centers of African American culture in New York City at the time.

Her students included Chief Bey, Pearl Primus, Coleridge-Taylor Perkinson,, Alice Dinizulu, Alexandreena Dixon, Eartha Kitt, Eleo Pomare, Bea Richards (later a prominent actress), and Brunilda Ruiz.

Ismay Andrews never traveled to Africa, but learned African traditions through researching in public libraries.

=== 1940s ===
In the 1940s, Andrews focused on the dances of East Africa. She founded and directed a dance company known as the Swa-Hili Dancers who performed re-constructed East African dances. (Note: See "Dance Observer". Dance Observer. Vol. 12–13. New York City. 1945. OCLC 1565860. and "Dances of Anatolian Turkey". Dance Observer. New York City. 1959. OCLC 1565860.) They performed on stage at the Stage Door Canteen, in cabarets, and for the USO during World War II.

The African American community in Harlem strongly supported Andrews cultural work throughout her career.

== Recognition ==
In May 1971, in a formal ceremony, the Modern Organization for Dance Evolvement (MODE), founded by Carole Johnson and others in New York, awarded Andrews their inaugural dance award for "a person who contributed to the black experience in dance".

== Death ==
She died in poverty in New York City.

== See also ==
- African-American art#The Harlem Renaissance to contemporary art
- African-American culture
- African-American dance
- Caterina Jarboro
- Josephine Baker
- Marcus Garvey
- Zora Neale Hurston
