= Aboriginal Dance Theatre Redfern =

Cultural centre in Sydney, Australia

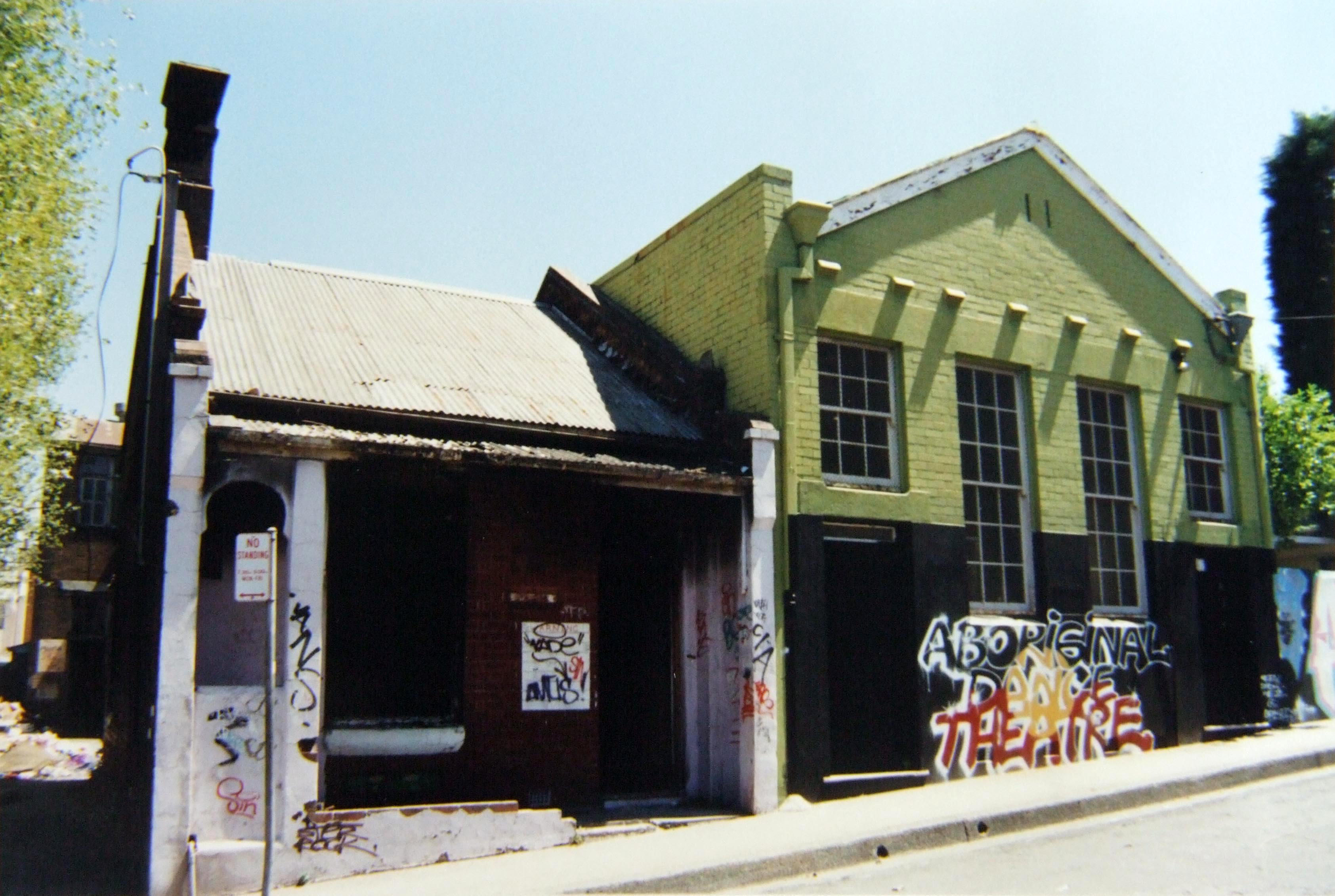
- Aboriginal Dance Theatre Redfern building, 1989
- Formation: 1979; 47 years ago
- Founder: Christine Donnelly
- Purpose: Indigenous Australian cultural organisation
- Website: aboriginaldancetheatreredfern.com

The Aboriginal Dance Theatre Redfern (ADTR) is an Australian non-profit organisation providing cultural and dance programs for Aboriginal Australian, located in the Sydney suburb of Redfern. It was founded in 1979 by Christine Donnelly, who remains executive director as of November 2022.

ADTR instigated the founding of the National Aboriginal Dance Council Australia (NADCA) in 1995.

== History ==
The Aboriginal Dance Theatre was founded in 1979 by Christine Donnelly, who remains at the helm as director as of 2022.

The idea of the theatre was based in political struggles, in particular the land rights activism of the 1970s. Donnelly had been a participant in the Six Weeks Performing Arts Training Programme held in Redfern (which later led to the development of NAISDA Dance College, and, indirectly, Bangarra Dance Theatre). It was originally housed in the National Black Theatre building, and both organisations used theatre as a form of political action.

Donnelly states that her objective in establishing the performing arts and cultural centre was "to bring dance to Aboriginal youth and children by furthering the cultural, social and educational development of Aboriginal people", especially the underprivileged people of Redfern. She is particularly proud of the establishment of the National Aboriginal Dance Council Australia (NADCA) in 1995. In this ADTR was supported by Ausdance National. NADCA was still in existence in 2007, when it was in the process of developing a document on "Cultural Protocols on Aboriginal Dance".

ADTR later moved to 82–88 Renwick Street.

== Programs ==
ADTR used to offer accredited courses in Aboriginal dance and theatre, as well as an outreach program in dance for young people from Sydney, regional New South Wales and beyond. Donnelly has encouraged people to dance in their own styles, whether traditional, contemporary dance, or a fusion of the two.

Today, the organisation's work is focused on Aboriginal health and well-being through culture, dance, sports and recreational programs. As of 2022 its programs include programs for children and young people, including cultural awareness, sports, and dance programs that cover many styles of dance (including traditional, contemporary, jazz, and hip-hop); women's programs (including health, social justice and leadership); and cultural programs, which include dance awareness, canoe-making, and a "men's business" group.

ADTR is a registered charitable institution.

== Christine Donnelly ==
Christine Donnelly, née Onus, is granddaughter of activist and showman Bill Onus, a Wiradjuri / Yorta Yorta man. She is the daughter of his daughter Christine. Her other grandfather is of the Darkinjung people of the Hawkesbury River, connected to Sydney Eora clans.

Donnelly's daughter Aiyisha is also involved in the performing arts, as well as visual art.

=== Recognition ===
A photographic portrait of Donnelly taken by renowned Aboriginal photographer Mervyn Bishop is included in the Sydney Elders exhibition at the Australian Museum. The exhibition was mounted in 2012, and represents a selection of Elders who have "contributed to the important role of culture, education, health, community or social justice".
