= Bangarra Dance Theatre =

Indigenous Australian dance company

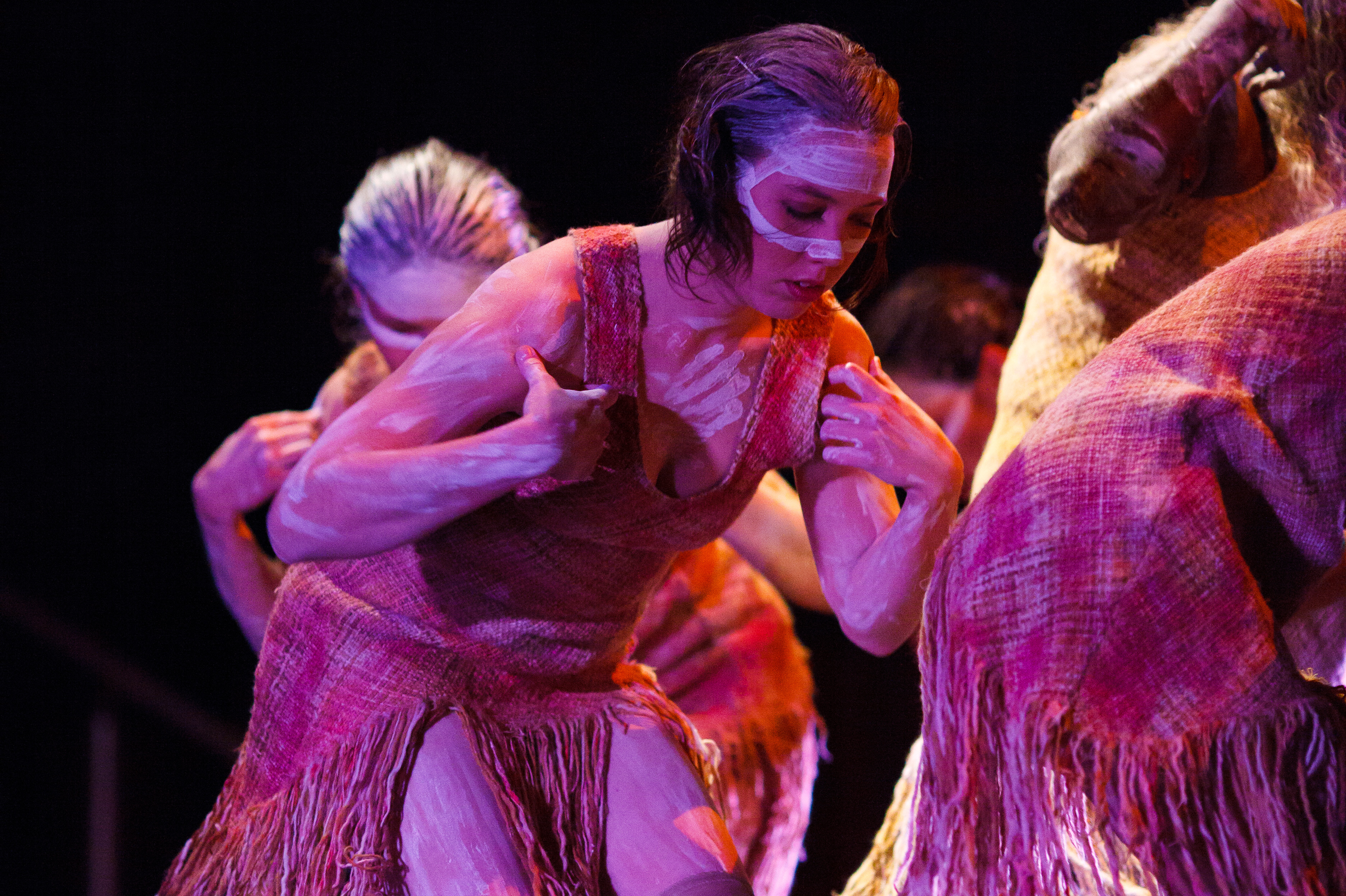
- Bangarra Dance Theatre at a 2011 Australian Human Rights Commission event
- Formation: 1989; 37 years ago
- Founder: Carole Y. Johnson, Rob Bryant, Cheryl Stone
- Website: www.bangarra.com.au

Bangarra Dance Theatre is an Aboriginal and Torres Strait Islander dance company focused on contemporary dance. It was founded by African American dancer and choreographer Carole Y. Johnson, Gumbaynggirr man Rob Bryant, and South African-born Cheryl Stone. Bangarra (/bɑːˈŋɑːrɑː/) means "to make fire" in Wiradjuri.

Stephen Page was artistic director from 1991 to 2021, with Frances Rings taking over in 2022. The company has received many Helpmann Awards as well as other accolades. Bennelong (2017) and Dark Emu (2018) have been among Bangarra's most successful works, playing to huge audiences around the country. Terrain has also been performed multiple times since 2012, most recently at the Venice International Festival of Contemporary Dance in July 2026.

== History ==
Bangarra Dance Theatre was founded in October 1989 by Carole Y. Johnson, an African-American modern dancer and founder of the National Aboriginal and Islander Skills Development Association (NAISDA), Rob Bryant, a Gumbaynggirr man and graduate of NAISDA, and Cheryl Stone, a South African-born student at NAISDA. The word bangarra (/bɑːˈŋɑːrɑː/) means "to make fire" in the Wiradjuri language, and is pronounced with the "eng" sound rather than a hard G.

Clive Joseph Robin "Rob" Bryant (later known as Uncle Rob Bryant), born in Bellingen, New South Wales in 1947, was a retired leading aircraftman of the RAAF and a Vietnam veteran. Stone had been born in South Africa, growing up in Cape Town and moving to Australia as a teenager in 1969. She participated in the six-week Black Theatre workshop established by Johnson in Redfern, Sydney, in 1975

Johnson toured Australia in 1972 with American choreographer Eleo Pomare and his company, and remained in Australia. In 1975, Johnson became the founding director of the Aboriginal Islander Skills Development Scheme, now known as the National Aboriginal and Islander Skills Development Association (NAISDA).

Johnson had a three-part plan for Aboriginal dance in Australia. It was to establish a school to give academic qualifications, and train dancers as members of a student and graduate performing company that would also teach. It would further provide a path for the dancers to other dance-related areas, including choreography, tour management, and all front and back of house skills. The other key aim was to maintain authentic cultural continuity, friendships, and close ties to traditional communities. Johnson mentored Stone, who studied alongside the dancers. She planned the formation of Bangarra Dance Theatre and, in 1989, became its founding artistic director. Bangarra is a Wiradjuri word meaning "to make fire".

Stephen Page has been the artistic director since 1991. Bangarra's first full-length show, Praying Mantis Dreaming, was produced in 1992. In 1994, Page, with Bernadette Walong as associate director, created Ochres and productions have followed annually since 2000. All have been successful within Australia and some have toured the United States and the United Kingdom. The group also made significant contributions to the opening and closing ceremonies of the 2000 Summer Olympics in Sydney. The opening ceremony was co-directed by Stephen Page along with Rhoda Roberts, and Page co-choreographed a segment called Awakening, which was narrated by Ernie Dingo.

In 2012, Rings first choreographed the nine-part piece Terrain, which was inspired by the South Australian salt lake Kati Thanda-Lake Eyre and Aboriginal people's Connection to Country.

Bennelong (2017) and Dark Emu (2018), were Bangarra's biggest ever works, playing to around 70,000 people across the country. Dark Emu was co-created by Stephen Page with former Bangarra dancers Daniel Riley and Yolande Brown, inspired by Bruce Pascoe's book of the same name. It became the most successful production in Bangarra's history, and was highly critically acclaimed.

In 2019, the company marked its thirtieth anniversary with the launch of a digital archive and exhibition called Knowledge Ground.

In early December 2021, Page announced that he would be stepping down from the role of artistic director in 2022, handing over to Frances Rings, former dancer and choreographer with Bangarra and later associate artistic director. Bangarra's last performance with Page as director was Wudjang: Not the Past, which premiered at the Sydney Festival in January 2022 before touring to Hobart and then Adelaide as part of the Adelaide Festival in March 2022.

In 2023, Rings, a Kokatha woman, was choreographer and artistic director for the company's new work, Yuldea. It tells the story of the South Australian town of Ooldea, which was settled in the early 20th century as it was close to the water source known as "Yooldil Kapi" by the Aboriginal groups who lived in the area, including the Kokatha, Mirning, and Wirangu peoples. Rings' father, a German migrant, worked on the railway, and her mother was born nearby. Yuldea has four acts – Supernova, Kapi (Water), Empire, and Ooldea Spirit. The creative team included Gamilaroi astronomer Karlie Noon, and musical duo Electric Fields, and Bangarra's chief composer, Leon Rodgers. The voices of people from Yalata were recorded for the last track.

Waru – journey of the small turtle, directed by Stephen Page and written by his son Hunter Page-Lochard, premiered in Sydney in 2023, and ran for two seasons before going on tour from 26 June to 9 November 2024. It was the first children's work performed by Bangarra, and won Best Production for Children in the Sydney Theatre Awards in 2023.

In July 2026, Bangarra Dance Theatre was awarded the Golden Lion for Lifetime Achievement in Dance by Biennale Danza 2026, the dance division of the Venice Biennale. This was the first time an Australian dance company has received this honour. The company performed the European premiere of Terrain on 25 and 26 July at the Teatro Malibran.

== Cultural identity ==
In September 2026, after a process of consultation with Wiradjuri elders and language specialists, including Uncle Stan Grant Snr and Letetia Harris, the company held a cultural workshop to help all members understand Wiradjuri culture, as well as the origin and correct pronunciation of the name of the company. Bangarra announced the correct pronunciation formerly, and Rings would like its staff, alumni, audiences, and others to use this pronunciation. She believes that language reclamation is important, as "the doorway to Country, they're the doorway to knowledge and understanding about kinship and family and lore and all of those practices that give us our identity".

== People ==
=== Page brothers ===
- Stephen Page AO, artistic director 1991–2021
- David Page (1961–2016), composer and musical director
- Russell Page (1968–2002), dancer

=== Others ===
- Raymond D. Blanco, who featured in the film Jindalee Lady (1992), was former Head of Culture and Training Operations at NAISDA, and the first Indigenous Australian to lead a dance company when he took over the reins of the Aboriginal Islander Dance Theatre in 1991
- Lillian Crombie, dancer
- Ella Havelka, dancer
- Elma Gada Kris, dancer and choreographer
- Banula Marika, dancer and musician
- Ningali Lawford-Wolf
- Daniel Riley, dancer and choreographer, artistic director of Australian Dance Theatre from 2022
- Frances Rings, dancer and choreographer, artistic director from 2022

== Works ==
- 1992 – Praying Mantis Dreaming
- 1995 – Ochres
- 1997 – Fish
- 1997 – Rites (with The Australian Ballet)
- 2000 – Skin (Spear, 2015 film, based on this)
- 2001 – Corroboree
- 2002 – Walkabout
- 2003 – Bush
- 2004 – Unaipon
- 2004 – CLAN
- 2005 – Boomerang
- 2006 – Gathering with the Australian Ballet
- 2007 – True Stories
- 2008 – Mathinna, based on the life of Palawa girl Mathinna
- 2008 — Rites (with The Australian Ballet)
- 2009 — Fire – A Retrospective
- 2010 – of earth & sky
- 2012 – Terrain
- 2013 – Blak
- 2014 – Patyegarang and Kinship
- 2015 – lore
- 2016 – OUR land people stories
- 2017 – Bennelong
- 2018 – Dubboo - life of a songman
- 2018 — Dark Emu
- 2019 — Spirit
- 2023 – Yuldea
- 2023 – Waru – journey of the small turtle
- 2024 – Dance Clan

== Discography ==
=== Albums ===
List of albums, with selected details
Title	Details
Clan: The Music (with David Page)	Released: 2004; Format: CD; Label: Nikinali Music (NN002)
Boomerang - The Music	Released: 2005; Format: CD; Label: Nikinali Music (NN003)
Lore - Dance Stories of Land and Sea (with David Page and Steve Francis)	Released: 2015; Format: CD; Label: Bangarra Dance Theatre (BDT2015)

=== Films ===
- Jindalee Lady (1992), featuring then lead dancer Raymond Blanco. This was the first fiction feature film directed by an Aboriginal director (Brian Syron).
- Spear (2015) – drama film directed by Stephen Page, based on the live performance Skin (2000).
- Firestarter – The Story of Bangarra (2020) is a feature-length documentary film about the dance company, directed by Nel Minchin and Wayne Blair. It covers 30 years of Bangarra's existence, charting the story of the three Page brothers' (Stephen, David and youngest brother, the dancer Russell) roles in the development of the company. The film had its world premiere as the closing night film of the Brisbane International Film Festival on 11 October 2020, and eight days later won the Adelaide Film Festival's Feature Documentary Award.

== Awards and nominations ==
In 1993, Bangarra was a joint winner of the Group Award in the Sidney Myer Performing Arts Awards, sharing the award with Italian Australian theatre company Doppio Teatro.

In July 2026, the company was awarded the Golden Lion for Lifetime Achievement in Dance at the Venice Biennale.

=== Australian Dance Awards ===
The Australian Dance Awards recognise excellence and promote dance in Australia. They are awarded under the auspices of the Australian Dance Council (Ausdance) for performance, choreography, design, dance writing, teaching and related professions. they commenced in 1997.

Year	Nominee / work	Award	Result (wins only)	Ref.
1997	Stephen Page (Artistic Director of Bangarra Dance Theatre)	Outstanding achievement in choreography	Won	
2004	Frances Rings for Unaipon (Bangarra Dance Theatre)	Outstanding Achievement in Choreography	Won	
2004	Fire - A Retrospective (Bangarra Dance Theatre)	Outstanding Performance by a Company	Won	
2010	Bangarra Dance Theatre for Belong	Outstanding Performance by a Company	Won	
2012	Bangarra Dance Theatre for Belong	Outstanding Performance by a Company	Won	
2015	Waangenga Blanco (Bangarra Dance Theatre)	Outstanding Performance by a Male Dancer for Patyegarang	Won	
2016	Bangarra Dance Theatre for Lore	Outstanding Performance by a Company	Won	
2016	Elma Kris for Lore (Bangarra Dance Theatre)	Outstanding Performance by a Female Dancer	Won	
2016	David Mack for Frame of Mind (Bangarra Dance Theatre)	Outstanding Performance by a Male Dancer	Won	
2017	Bangarra Dance Theatre for OUR Land People Stories	Outstanding Performance by a Company	Won	
2018	Beau Dean Riley Smith for Bennelong (Bangarra Dance Theatre)	Outstanding Performance by a Male Dancer	Won	

=== Deadly Awards ===
The Deadly Awards, (commonly known simply as The Deadlys), was an annual celebration of Australian Aboriginal and Torres Strait Islander achievement in music, sport, entertainment and community. They ran from 1996 to 2013.

Year	Nominee / work	Award	Result (wins only)	Ref.
Deadly Awards 2008	Stephen Page and Bangarra Dance Theatre	Outstanding Achievement in Entertainment	awarded	
Deadly Awards 2009	Stephen Page and Bangarra Dance Theatre	Achievement in Theatre or Live Performance	Won	

=== Helpmann Awards ===
The company has received the Helpmann Award for Best Ballet or Dance Work a number of times. The Helpmann Awards is an awards show, celebrating live entertainment and performing arts in Australia, presented by industry group Live Performance Australia since 2001. Note: 2020 and 2021 were cancelled due to the COVID-19 pandemic.

Year	Nominee / work	Award	Result	Ref.
2001	Skin (Bangarra Dance Theatre)	Helpmann Award for Best Ballet or Dance Work	Won	
2001	Stephen Page for Skin (Bangarra Dance Theatre)	Helpmann Award for Best Choreography in a Ballet or Dance Work	Nominated	
2001	Stephen Page for Skin (Bangarra Dance Theatre)	Helpmann Award for Best New Australian Work	Won	
2001	Karen Norris for Skin (Bangarra Dance Theatre)	Helpmann Award for Best Lighting Design	Nominated	
2002	Corroboree (Bangarra Dance Theatre)	Best Ballet or Dance Work	Nominated	
2002	Stephen Page for Corroboree (Bangarra Dance Theatre)	Best Choreography in a Ballet or Dance Work	Won	
2002	Stephen Page for Corroboree (Bangarra Dance Theatre)	Best New Australian Work	Nominated	
2002	David Page and Steve Francis – Corroboree	Best Best Sound Design	Nominated	
2003	Walkabout (Bangarra Dance Theatre)	Best Ballet or Dance Work	Nominated	
2003	Walkabout (Bangarra Dance Theatre)	Best New Australian Work	Won	
2003	Stephen Page for Walkabout (Bangarra Dance Theatre)	Helpmann Award for Best Original Score	Won	
2003	Stephen Page and Steven McTaggart "Rush" - Walkabout (Bangarra Dance Theatre)	Best Choreography in a Ballet or Dance Work	Nominated	
2003	Frances Rings "Rations" - Walkabout (Bangarra Dance Theatre)	Best Choreography in a Ballet or Dance Work	Nominated	
2003	Russell Page – Walkabout (Bangarra Dance Theatre)	Best Male Dancer in a Ballet or Dance Work	Won	
2004	Bush (Bangarra Dance Theatre)	Best Ballet or Dance Work	Won	
2004	Stephen Page Bush (Bangarra Dance Theatre)	Best Choreography in a Ballet or Dance Work	Nominated	
2004	Jennifer Irwin – Bush (Bangarra Dance Theatre)	Best Costume Design	Nominated	
2004	Nick Schlieper – Bush (Bangarra Dance Theatre)	Best Lighting Design	Won	
2006	Jennifer Irwin – Amalgamate (The Australian Ballet & Bangarra Dance Theatre)	Best Costume Design	Nominated	
2007	Clan (Bangarra Dance Theatre)	Helpmann Award for Best Regional Touring Production	Nominated	
2008	True Stories (Bangarra Dance Theatre)	Best Regional Touring Production	Nominated	
2009	Mathinna (Bangarra Dance Theatre)	Best Ballet or Dance Work	Won	
2009	Stephen Page Mathinna (Bangarra Dance Theatre)	Best Choreography in a Dance or Physical Theatre Production	Won	
2009	David Page for Walkabout (Bangarra Dance Theatre)	Best Original Score	Won	
2010	Fire (Bangarra Dance Theatre)	Best Ballet or Dance Work	Won	
2010	Deborah Brown Fire (Bangarra Dance Theatre)	Best Female Dancer in a Dance or Physical Theatre Work	Nominated	
2010	Stephen Page Fire (Bangarra Dance Theatre)	Best Choreography in a Dance or Physical Theatre Production	Won	
2010	True Stories (Bangarra Dance Theatre)	Best Regional Touring Production	Won	
2011	Frances Rings – Artefact (of Earth & Sky) (Bangarra Dance Theatre)	Best Choreography in a Dance or Physical Theatre Production	Nominated	
2011	Mathinna (Bangarra Dance Theatre)	Best Regional Touring Production	Won	
2012	Stephen Page – ID from Belong (Bangarra Dance Theatre)	Best Choreography in a Ballet or Dance Work	Won	
2012	Waangenga Blanco – Belong (Bangarra Dance Theatre)	Best Male Dancer in a Ballet or Dance Work	Nominated	
2012	David Page and Steve Francis – Belong (Bangarra Dance Theatre)	Best Original Score	Won	
2013	Terrain (Bangarra Dance Theatre)	Best Ballet or Dance Work	Won	
2013	Deborah Brown – Terrain (Bangarra Dance Theatre)	Best Female Dancer in a Dance or Physical Theatre Production	Won	
2013	David Page - Terrain (Bangarra Dance Theatre)	Best Original Score	Won	
2013	Frances Rings - Terrain (Bangarra Dance Theatre)	Best Choreography in a Ballet or Dance Work	Nominated	
2013	Artefact (of Earth & Sky) (Bangarra Dance Theatre)	Best Regional Touring Production	Nominated	
2014	David Page & Paul Mac – Blak	Best Original Score	Nominated	
2015	Stephen Page – Patyegarang (Bangarra Dance Theatre)	Best Choreography in a Dance or Physical Theatre Production	Nominated	
2016	Sheoak (Bangarra Dance Theatre)	Best Ballet or Dance Work	Won	
2016	Frances Rings – Sheoak (Bangarra Dance Theatre)	Best Choreography in a Dance or Physical Theatre Work	Won	
2016	Stephen Page, Bernadette Walong-Sene, Djakapurra Munyarryun – Ochres (Bangarra Dance Theatre)	Best Choreography in a Dance or Physical Theatre Work	Nominated	
2016	Yolanda Lowatta – Sheoak (Bangarra Dance Theatre)	Best Female Dancer in a Dance or Physical Theatre Work	Won	
2016	Frances Rings, Deborah Brown and Waangenga Blanco – Lore (Bangarra Dance Theatre)	Best New Australian Work	Nominated	
2016	David Page - Ochres (Bangarra Dance Theatre)	Best Original Score	Nominated	
2016	David Page - Ochres (Bangarra Dance Theatre)	Best Sound Design	Nominated	
2017	OUR Land People Stories (Bangarra Dance Theatre)	Best Dance Production	Nominated	
2017	Jennifer Irwin - OUR Land People Stories (Bangarra Dance Theatre)	Best Costume Design	Nominated	
2017	Elma Kris – Nyapanyapa (Bangarra Dance Theatre)	Best Female Dancer in a Dance or Physical Theatre Work	Nominated	
2017	Terrain (Bangarra Dance Theatre)	Best Regional Touring Production	Won	
2018	Bennelong (Bangarra Dance Theatre)	Best Dance Production	Won	
2018	OUR Land People Stories (Bangarra Dance Theatre)	Best Regional Touring Production	Won	
2018	Stephen Page – Bennelong (Bangarra Dance Theatre)	Best New Australian Work	Won	
2018	Steve Francis – Bennelong (Bangarra Dance Theatre)	Best Original Score	Nominated	
2018	Jennifer Irwin – Bennelong (Bangarra Dance Theatre)	Best Costume Design	Nominated	
2018	Jacob Nash – Bennelong (Bangarra Dance Theatre)	Best Scenic Design	Won	
2018	Nick Schlieper – Bennelong (Bangarra Dance Theatre)	Best Lighting Design	Won	
2019	Waangenga Blanco – Dark Emu (Bangarra Dance Theatre)	Best Male Dancer in a Ballet, Dance or Physical Theatre Production	Won	
2019	Bennelong (Bangarra Dance Theatre)	Best Regional Touring Production	Won	

== See also ==
- Aboriginal Dance Theatre Redfern
- Dance in Australia
- NAISDA Dance College
- National Black Theatre (Australia)
