= Leni Wylliams =

American dancer and choreographer (1961–1996)

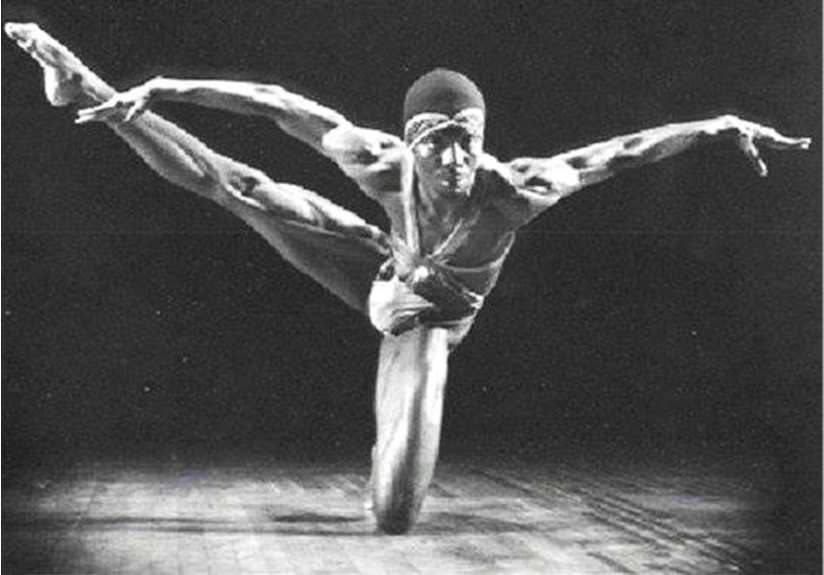
- Leni Wylliams dancing ORBWEB in 1983
- Born: Leonard Morrell Williams; January 15, 1961; Denver, Colorado
- Died: September 13, 1996 (aged 35); Kansas City
- Education: Thomas Jefferson High School (Denver)

Leni Wylliams (born Leonard Morrell Williams; January 15, 1961 – September 13, 1996) was an African-American dancer and choreographer.

== Early life and education ==
Leni Wylliams (né Leonard Morrell Williams) was born January 15, 1961 in Denver, Colorado, to Allice Williams and Harold Williams, Jr. His three sisters were Kimberly, Dana, and Rebecca.

In 1979, he graduated from Thomas Jefferson High School (Denver).

== Career ==
Wylliams began to pursue dance training at the Denver-based school of Cleo Parker Robinson during his early teens and subsequently advanced to performing in her company – Cleo Parker Robinson Dance Ensemble – until 1982 when at the invitation of Eleo Pomare, he moved to New York City to appear with Eleo Pomare Dance Company. Ultimately, Pomare set all of his solos on Wylliams - entrusting Wylliams to dance all of the roles he - Pomare - had created and performed for himself.

Wylliams also danced in the companies of José Limón, Pina Bausch, Paul Sanasardo, Donald Byrd, Fred Benjamin, and Rod Rodgers, as well as with Nederlands Dans Theater and Forces of Nature Dance Theatre Company.

Wylliams choreographed for ballet and modern dance companies around the world. Among dances he choreographed are Ascension, Baharini, Evidence of Souls Not Seen, In the Rain, Minus Him, Quiet City, Shah Tah Tee and Sweet In The Morning. Wylliams taught in Russia, East Germany, Asia, and throughout the United States. He, too, was a visiting professor of dance at the University of Missouri-Kansas City's Conservatory of Music.

In Boston during the late 1980s, Wylliams was interim-artistic-director of the Danny Sloan Dance Company; was founding artistic director of Wyll Danse Theatre; collaborated with acclaimed television producer Barbara Barrow-Murray; appeared 1989 with Sarah Caldwell’s Opera Company of Boston [OCB]; was assistant choreographer to renown-Broadway-choreographer Patricia Birch for the OCB’s 1989 staging of Leonard Bernstein's Mass, as well as for a 1989 OCB engagement at the Bolshoi in Moscow.

Wylliams was assistant choreographer for Martin, a ballet tribute to Martin Luther King Jr. with music and libretto by Gordon Parks, which premiered in Washington, D.C. during 1989 and was screened on national television on King's birthday in 1990. Wylliams also assisted Carmen de Lavallade in choreographing the Metropolitan Opera's 1990 staging of Porgy and Bess .

Wylliams met Mary Pat Henry while both were guest artists during a 1987 Victoria Arts Collaborative summer intensive in Victoria, BC, Canada. It was there that they became aware of their remarkably-similar visions of dance and its history. Henry, who during 1986 had relocated from New York City to the University of Missouri–Kansas City to teach at its Conservatory of Music, asked Wylliams to join her there too, which he did during 1990. During 1991, the two of them co-founded the Wylliams/Henry Danse Theatre and were its co-directors.

During 1991, Wylliams choreographed, in collaboration with Heather White, what was to become his signature solo - Sweet In The Morning, with vocals by Bobby McFerrin.

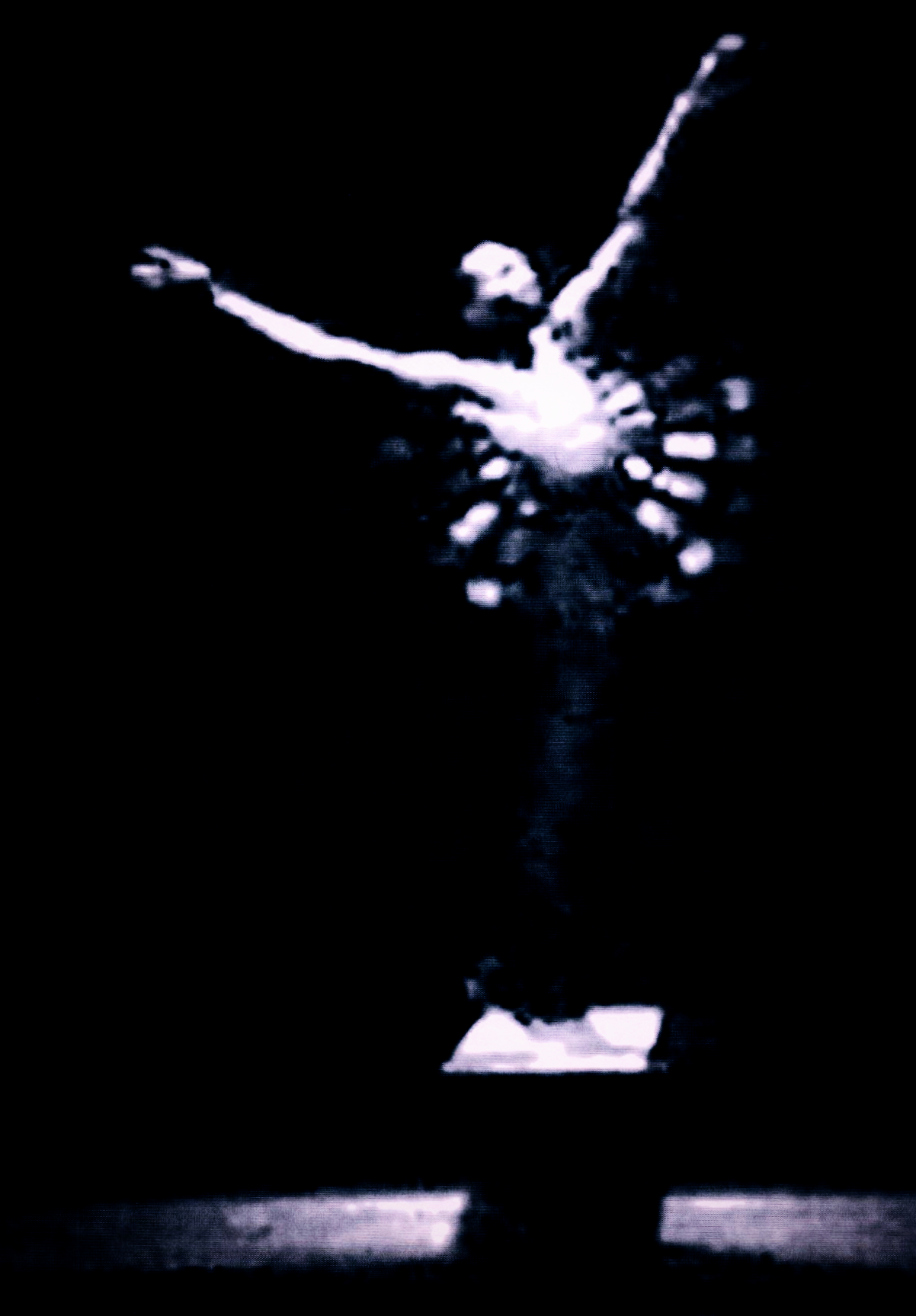
Sweet in the Morning danced by Leni Wylliams, May 1994

Wylliams performed his Sweet In The Morning during a "Blasts From The Past And Deep Down Soul" dance event (curated by Dianne McIntyre) Wednesday, July 3 at the 1996 National Black Arts Festival [NBAF] in Atlanta, GA. That signature solo danced by Wylliams was shown along with a select array of presentations by other NBAF performance artists in a televised documentary of the festival - Ark of the Spirit - with Avery Brooks produced by Turner Broadcasting System.

== Death and legacy ==
=== Murder ===
On the morning of Friday, September 13, 1996, Wylliams was found murdered in the bedroom of his Kansas City home, having been bludgeoned, doused with a flammable substance, and set on fire. The Jackson County medical examiner's office determined Wylliams had died of blunt trauma and smoke inhalation.

On September 17, 1996, suspect Timothy O. Evans was apprehended and charged with first-degree murder and armed criminal action, after significant evidence had been found to incriminate him. Prior to his encounter with Wylliams, Evans had told acquaintances he was going out to "jack" [rob] someone. On December 11, 1997, Evans was found guilty of first-degree murder, first-degree arson, and armed criminal action. He was given a life sentence in the beating death, a life sentence for armed criminal action, plus 15 years for first-degree arson.

=== Praise ===
Fellow-artistic director Mary Pat Henry described Wylliams as having “one of the most articulate bodies” in which one “could see every muscle and every move of the dance as it moved through him”. Wylliams was lauded by Kansas City Star classical-music-editor Scott Cantrell as having danced with “the quality of radium” and moving “with power and fine-tuned precision, but also with a riveting ecstasy”. After being witness to a solo danced by Wylliams, Katherine Dunham told Wylliams “you are pure poetry”.

The November 1983 performance by Wylliams as "Profit Jones" in Eleo Pomare's Radiance of the Dark during Eleo Pomare Dance Company's 25th anniversary season was reported in a New York Times review as being “show stopping”. A May 1985 NY Times review of dances presented by José Limón Dance Company's Clay Taliaferro cites "the impressive Leni Wylliams". During Fred Benjamin Dance Company's twentieth year celebration in 1989, Wylliams danced the solo Illuminations which Benjamin remarked "just about stopped the show!"

As an instructor, Wyllliams was praised as having the ability to inspire dancers to believe in themselves – to believe the impossible was possible. If a class was stuck, Wylliams would sing Summertime and tell the students to start moving to it.

=== Tributes ===
Awards established and/or named in honor of Leni Wylliams :

- Leni Wylliams Award presented by Cleo Robinson Dance, Denver: Saluting achievements in Choreography and Innovation.
- Summertime Award presented by Coquitlam District Music Festival, Port Coquitlam, BC, Canada : A glass memorial trophy with a willow tree etched into it - inscribed "In memory of Leni Wylliams, an adjudicator, that had soul, artistry, and the incredible ability to make young dancers believe in themselves" - presented with a small bursary during Honour Performance at the end of each Coquitlam District Music Festival.

== Wylliams/Henry Danse Theatre ==
The company built by co-artistic directors Leni Wylliams and Mary Pat Henry has been considered an influential contributor to the development of dance in the Midwestern United States. Wylliams/Henry Contemporary Dance Company (formerly Wylliams/Henry Danse Theatre) maintains a repertory of more than 100 works.

It has been noted for its athletic style and for presenting works drawn from a rich archive of American modern dance traditions. The company's repertory contains not only their own works, but also dances by a range of choreographers.

== See also ==
- List of dancers
