= Aboriginal Centre for the Performing Arts =

Performing arts organization in Australia

Coordinates: 27.4754°S 153.0367°E

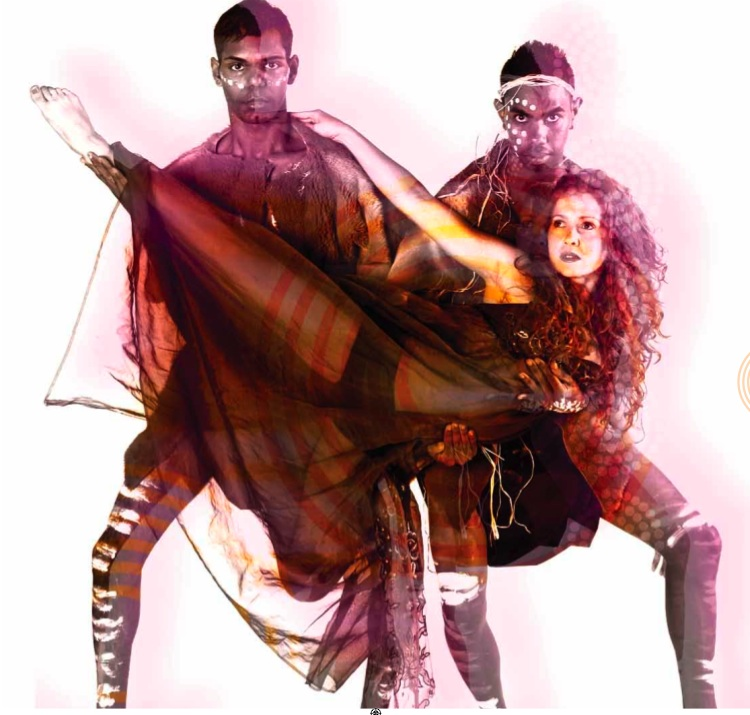
A 2012 ACPA production

The Aboriginal Centre for the Performing Arts (ACPA) is a national Australian institution for the culturally sensitive training of Aboriginal Australian and Torres Strait Islander people in the performing arts. Founded in 1997, it has been located in Fortitude Valley, Brisbane, since 2017.

== History ==
The proposal for a national training institution for Aboriginal and Torres Strait Islander performing arts first arose in 1994, as part of the federal government's national arts policy, "Creative Nation". In 1997 the Queensland Government engaged choreographer and dancer Michael Leslie to establish the Aboriginal Centre for the Performing Arts, and in 1998 classes were first held at the Metro Arts building in Edward Street, Brisbane.

ACPA moved first to South Brisbane, then to Kangaroo Point. In January 2017, ACPA moved again, to the Judith Wright Arts Centre in Fortitude Valley, where greatly improved facilities include purpose-built studios for music, acting and dance.

== Description ==
The organisation teaches Indigenous and non-Indigenous acting, music and dance. It has won several national awards and is nationally accredited as a registered training organisation. ACPA receives funding from the Queensland and Australian governments, as well as from the private sector.

== Funding and governance ==
The Aboriginal Centre for the Performing Arts is supported by the Queensland Government through Arts Queensland and the Department of Education and Training. ACPA's education partners include the Brisbane Arts Theatre, the University of Tasmania and Queensland University of Technology. Its corporate supporters include the Judith Wright Arts Centre, the Queensland Performing Arts Centre, the National Institute of Dramatic Art, and Ausdance Queensland. The current CEO as of January 2019 is Wesley Aird.
