= Aboriginal Islander Dance Theatre =

Indigenous Australian dance company

Aboriginal Islander Dance Theatre (AIDT) was the first dance company used to train Aboriginal and Torres Strait Islander students on their dancing career, and grew into a performance group. Originating in the National Aboriginal and Islander Skills Development Association (predecessor to NAISDA), it was based in Sydney, New South Wales, and operated from 1976 to 1998.

== History ==
The group has its origins in "Careers in Dance", a full-time dance training course established in 1975 for Aboriginal and Islander students by the Aboriginal Arts Board and headed by African American dancer Carole Johnson, who had links to the Black Power movement in the United States. She set up classes in St James Church Hall in the Sydney suburb of Glebe, where the training included traditional as well as contemporary styles of dance. The group of student dancers established in 1976 grew to include teachers as well as advanced and graduate students of the NAISDA (National Aboriginal and Islander Skills Development Association) Dance College, and in 1988 became a professional performing group.

In 1977 AIDT embarked on its first international tour, with Wayne Nicol, Michael Leslie, Richard Talonga, Lillian Crombie and Roslyn Watson (as guest artist) performing at the Second African and Black World Festival of Arts and Culture (FESTAC 77) in Nigeria. After undergoing its transformation into a large professional dance troupe in 1988, AIDT performed in Finland and Germany, and later toured throughout Australia, as well as in Asia, Europe and the Americas. The company became known as the most toured dance company in Australia.

In 1989 Johnson resigned, believing at that time that the school and the company were too closely connected, and their aims sometimes conflicted. There were multiple government grants from various sources, demanding different criteria and creating a large administrative burden. John Alderman was appointed to the role of leading the company in 1987, but the Aboriginal Arts Board soon afterwards directed that senior roles needed to be occupied by Aboriginal people, or it would withdraw its funding.

In 1991 Raymond D. Blanco, who also danced with the company, became artistic director, the first Indigenous Australian to lead a dance company.

The company wound up in 1998.

== People ==
Notable dancers in the 1970s included Wayne Nicol, Michael Leslie, Richard Talonga, and Lillian Crombie.

Malcolm Cole (1949-1995), was an Aboriginal and South Sea Islander man from Far North Queensland, who later also taught at the college. He is especially remembered for his participation in the 1988 Sydney Mardi Gras, in which, in collaboration with artist Panos Couros, he enacted the story of the First Fleet, with himself as Captain Cook – the first ever Aboriginal float entry in the parade.

Notable dancers in the 1980s included Monica Stevens and Sylvia Blanco. Stevens is featured in "NAISDA with Monica Stevens", an episode in the 2013 documentary television series Desperate Measures. It is available on SBS on Demand.

Dance tutors included Janet Munyarryun, Larry Gurruwiwi.

== Notable works ==
- Gelam, choreographed by Dujon Niue, the first ever adaptation of a Torres Strait Island legend
- Colours, the first contemporary interpretation of Indigenous use of colour, in a concept from dancer Gary Lang and choreographed by Marilyn Miller, Dujon Niue and Raymond Blanco

== Notable students ==
- Gail Mabo, 1984 to 1987
- Stephen Page
- Mitch Torres

== See also ==
- Aboriginal Centre for the Performing Arts
