= Eleo Pomare =

American choreographer (1937–2008)

- Born: 20 October 1937; Santa Marta, Colombia
- Died: August 8, 2008 (aged 70); Manhattan, New York City
- Occupation: Choreographer
- Known for: Politically-charged productions; Black dance

Eleo Pomare (20 October 1937 – 8 August 2008) was a Colombian-American modern dance choreographer. Known for his politically charged productions depicting the Black experience, his work had a major influence on contemporary dance, especially Black dance. He founded the Eleo Pomare Modern Dance Company in Amsterdam, Netherlands (1960–1963), and, after returning to the United States, established the Eleo Pomare Dance Company in New York City in 1964, which continued after his death. After a tour to Australia in 1972, and the subsequent return of his then lead dancer, Carole Johnson, his style of dancing continues to influence Aboriginal and Torres Strait Islander modern dancers.

== Early life and education ==
Eleo Pomare was born on 20 October 1937 in Santa Marta, Colombia, where on 19 June 1940 his sister Selina Forbes Pomare also was born. His father - James "Tawney" Forbes of Haitian/French ancestry - was captain of a cargo ship which while near Colón, Panama during World War II was torpedoed by the Germans. Six-year-old Pomare was with his dad at that time and was rescued, but his father was never found.

Afterward, Pomare went to live with his mother - Mildred Pomare Lee - in Panama. During 1947, he was sent on his own to stay with an aunt and uncle in New York City where a few years later, he was joined by his mother. Pomare attended New Lincoln School in Harlem and later studied at New York's High School of Performing Arts, where he was mentored by Verita Pearson prior to graduating in 1953. During that time, Pomare was also teaching dance to young people at the Police Athletic League (PAL).

== Career ==
Pomare founded his first dance company in 1957, called Corybantes, but dismantled it to travel to Europe to study and perform with Kurt Jooss and Harold Kreutzberg in Essen, Germany, on a John Hay Whitney scholarship. After clashing with British choreographer teacher Antony Tudor there, refusing to comply with "the preservation of a racialized hierarchy within dance", he left the Jooss school, along with the other dancers in his group. He established his own dance company in Amsterdam, Netherlands, called the Eleo Pomare Modern Dance Company (1960–1963). There he collaborated with many dancers, in particular the Australian modern dancer, teacher, and choreographer, Elizabeth Cameron Dalman (then Wilson), who became company manager. His most significant performance with the company was Resonance, a collaboration with the electronic composer Ton Bruynèl, Japanese-American sculptor Shikiji Tajiri, and African-American painter Sam Middleton, first presented in Rotterdam and afterwards in other cities in the Netherlands. Dalman also danced in this production.

He returned to the United States in 1964, when he revived and expanded his company. The company performed at the Waltann School of Creative Arts in Brooklyn in November 1967.

During September 1966, Pomare, along with Carole Johnson and others, established the Association of Black Choreographers, which later was followed by founding of The Feet, a magazine for black dancers.

William Moore (1933–1992), African American dance critic, dancer, researcher, and founder of Dance Herald magazine, managed the company at some point.

=== Major works ===
An important work was Gin. Woman. Distress., a three-part solo dance, to the songs of Bessie Smith. It depicts the slow deterioration of a homeless woman. Pomare choreographed the work for Elizabeth Cameron Dalman in New York during 1966, and it was widely toured by Dalman in Europe and Australia from 1966 to 1987. The work was also taught to Johnson, who performed it in Adelaide in 1972.

One of the company's signature pieces developed by Pomare was called Blues for the Jungle (1966), originally titled Harlem Moods, as it depicted life in Harlem, New York. First performed in Amsterdam, the work is in three parts: Underworld, From Prison Walls, and Dat Day. Other productions in the 1960s included Missa Luba in 1965 and Las Desenamoradas in 1967 (based on Federico García Lorca's play The House of Bernarda Alba set to "Olé" by John Coltrane).

A November 1983 performance by Leni Wylliams as "Profit Jones" in Radiance of the Dark during the company's 25th anniversary season was reported in a New York Times review as being "show stopping". Other featured dancers included:

- Dudley Williams
- Loretta Abbott
- Al Perryman
- Dyane Harvey-Salaam
- Charles Grant
- Chuck Davis
- Martial Roumain

In 1986, in honour of Nelson Mandela, Pomare created Morning Without Sunrise, set to music by Max Roach.

=== Touring ===
The company toured to Adelaide, South Australia, in 1972, to perform at the Adelaide Festival of Arts. Dancers on the tour were: Carole Johnson, Roberta Pikser, Jennifer Barry, Frank Ashley, Strody Meekins, Martial Roumain, Henry Yu Hao Yen, Lillian Coleman, Dyane Harvey, and Carole Simpson.

Pomare came to the attention of Aboriginal Australian activists after refusing to perform at Chequers Theatre, situated in the suburb of Nailsworth, north of Adelaide city centre. Pomare deemed it unsafe for the type of performance, and an inferior venue, and he insisted that his company be treated with respect. The powers that be ensured that equipment and props were moved to the Warner Theatre in King William Street, in time for the performance the following day. Pomare upset the box office manager by giving his allocation of orchestra seats away to some Aboriginal people who wanted to see the performance but had not been able to get tickets. The company performed Blues for the Jungle on this tour, which, according to Johnson, "really excited the blacks who saw for the first time how the contemporary arts could be used to convey relevant social messages". Johnson also performed Gin. Woman. Distress. on the tour.

The company also toured to Sydney, supported by the Australia Council for the Arts. Johnson went on to run a workshop and then start courses for Aboriginal Australians, and headed the Aboriginal Islander Dance Theatre in 1976.

The company also toured North America, Europe, Asia, the Caribbean and Africa, performing in Lagos, Nigeria, for FESTAC '77, the Second World Black and African Festival of Arts and Culture.

== Recognition ==
Pomare was awarded a Guggenheim Fellowship in 1972.

The borough president of Manhattan, David Dinkins, declared 7 January 1987 as Eleo Pomare Day.

== Death and legacy ==
Pomare died of cancer in Manhattan, New York, on 8 August 2008.

The Eleo Pomare Dance Company continued after his death. Dancer and choreographer Martial Roumain, who joined the company as a teenager, was responsible for preserving Pomare's work and for future performances of it.

An exhibition celebrating his achievements, entitled The Man, The Artist, The Maker of Artists, was mounted at the National Museum of Dance from 2011 to 2012.

In January 2021, Loris Anthony Beckles, a former member of the Eleo Pomare Dance Company and founder of the Beckles Dancing Company in Dallas, Texas, gave a talk on Pomare's legacy, entitled Dance as activism: Meet Eleo Pomare, a revolutionary artist.

Pomare is often considered the angry black man of modern dance, although he did not consider himself angry or bitter, but that he is rather "telling it like it is". "I'm labeled...angry...because I will not do what they want from a black dancer. They want black exotics... I have something to say and I want to say it honestly, strongly and without having it stolen, borrowed or messed over."

The impact of Pomare as writer, dancer and choreographer has helped many gain an understanding of the black experience. Johnson's work with Aboriginal and Torres Strait Islander dancers in Australia, helping to create NAISDA's forerunner in 1975, and subsequent formation of Bangarra Dance Theatre in 1989, carried on Pomare's legacy. Johnson herself said that "Pomare made me the dancer that I am today... I was very technical, which he liked, but he managed to pull all my emotion out". She also said that he had a strong influence in Australia, the legacy of his 1972 visit to Adelaide.
