= Carole Johnson (dancer) =

African American contemporary dancer and choreographer (born 1940)

- Born: Carole Yvonne Johnson; 1940 (age 85–86); Philadelphia, PA., U.S.
- Education: Adelphi College; Juilliard School
- Occupations: Contemporary dancer Choreographer; Arts administrator
- Years active: 1960s to present
- Known for: Co-founder of NAISDA and Bangarra Dance Theatre

Carole Yvonne Johnson (born 1940) is an African American contemporary dancer and choreographer, known for her role in the establishment of the National Aboriginal Islander Skills Development Association (NAISDA), and as co-founder of Bangarra Dance Theatre in Australia. Early in her career she became a lead dancer in the Eleo Pomare Dance Company, and Pomare had a profound influence on her dancing style.

She is also an activist, arts administrator and researcher.

== Early life and education ==
Carole Yvonne Johnson was born in Jersey City, New Jersey of African-American descent. Her father, Fred S. A. Johnson, formed a branch of the YMCA in North Philadelphia, and Carole grew up Philadelphia. The family was middle class, and she trained in classical ballet as a child. As a teenager, she studied at the Philadelphia Ballet Guild under British choreographer Antony Tudor (who founded the school in the mid-1950s, and mentored black students there). She also trained under Sydney Gibson King.

After graduating from high school, she was introduced to modern dance at Adelphi College in Garden City, New York. In 1960, she was accepted into the Juilliard School in New York City, and graduated in 1963 with a Bachelor of Arts. During her studies, she also attended further technique classes with the New Dance Group.

== Early career ==
Staying in NYC, Johnson continued dance studies in ballet and jazz dance, at the same time teaching at various schools in New York, including the Waltann School of Creative Arts in Brooklyn and at the Harlem YMCA. She also performed with a number of ballet companies, including Ballet Guild, Ballet Players and Ballet Concepts.

In 1966 she joined the Eleo Pomare Dance Company. The company practised modern dance and focused on "the black experience through political expression", and Johnson became a principal dancer within the troupe. In December 1966, Johnson performed the work presented Gin. Woman. Distress. with Australian dancer Elizabeth Cameron Dalman at the Choreographic Workshop Series of the Association of Black Choreographers. She later said that "Pomare made me the dancer that I am today... I was very technical, which he liked, but he managed to pull all my emotion out".

During September 1966, along with Eleo Pomare, Rod Rodgers, Gus Solomon and Pearl Reynolds, Johnson established the Association of Black Choreographers, which was predecessor to the Modern Organization for Dance Evolvement [MODE]. Its stated emphases were "to be of service to professionals in dance, and to be an educational and informational organisation for the general public and people in other professions interested in dance", and its 12 listed goals showed a focus on black dance.

In 1970 Johnson founded and became the editor of The Feet (also styled THE FEET and The FEET), a magazine for black dancers which was published from 1970 to 1973 (23 issues) as a project of MODE, with its final anniversary edition published in June 1973. Bernadine Jennings, who worked under Johnson at the time and later established and ran Dance Giant Steps to promote professional dance artists and companies, was a contributor to the magazine. Contributors included Chuck Davis, Rod Rodgers, and Zita Allen (a founding contributor), and The Feet was later edited by Alicia Adams.

In the final issue of The Feet, Johnson listed several accomplishments of MODE: a new dance service award (with the inaugural one given to Ismay Andrews, an early teacher of many later luminaries); a television panel discussion; a community dance series; and the First National Congress on Blacks in Dance, held at Indiana University Bloomington, from 26 June to 1 July 1973.

In 1971, Johnson was awarded a fellowship by the New York State Council to travel to Senegal, Sierra Leone and Ghana to study traditional dance in those countries, and to study and teach at the University of Ghana.

Johnson's work contributed to a definition of "Black dance"; she saw it as "first and foremost, movement that is not limited to any one particular technique, vocabulary or style".

== Work in Australia ==
In 1972, the Eleo Pomare Dance Company toured to Australia to perform the Adelaide Festival of Arts in Adelaide, South Australia, and Sydney, New South Wales, supported by the Australia Council for the Arts. The company performed their signature piece Blues for the Jungle on this tour, which, according to Johnson, "really excited the blacks who saw for the first time how the contemporary arts could be used to convey relevant social messages". Johnson, who was at that time the leading dancer in the company, decided to stay on in Australia for a while, to help develop dance performances by Aboriginal and Torres Strait Islander dancers.

At the Adelaide Festival, Johnson was introduced to Jennifer Isaacs, Indigenous officer for the Australia Council, by South African visual artist Bauxhau Stone (who had been working with Pitjantjatjara artists in the Central Desert). This meeting led to funding for Johnson to deliver training in the form of dance workshops in the inner-Sydney suburb of Redfern, on the Sydney leg of the tour. Johnson set up a six-week Aboriginal modern dance workshop, (in which dancer Cheryl Stone participated). As part of the drive to save the Aboriginal Tent Embassy, she created The Challenge - Embassy Dance, featuring students from the workshops, including Wayne Nicol; Norma Williams (Ingram); Euphemia "Phemie" Bostock and her daughter Tracey; and sisters Elsie and Joanne Vesper. Johnson compared the situation of urban Aboriginal Australians to Black people living in ghetto conditions in New York. She left Australia after the workshop.

Johnson returned to Australia twice during the following three years to hold workshops in Sydney. By 1973, Redfern had become a hive of social and political activity and activism. She became involved with the National Black Theatre that had been established in Redfern, at the same time being appointed as urban theatre consultant for the Aboriginal Arts Board (of the Australia Council). She strove to see urban Aboriginal people reconnecting to their roots, with their diverse communities getting together to produce song and dance, at the same time providing exposure of these cultures to a wider (non-Indigenous) audience. She was involved with Sydney Theatre Company's Cradle of Hercules in 1974, and then ran workshops in contemporary dance workshops in collaboration with the Black Theatre workshop, which had been created in Sydney by Jenny Sheehan (aka Jenni(e) van de Steenhaven), a young non-Indigenous drama student from the University of New South Wales, Paul Coe, and Bob Maza. Coe and Maza were from Melbourne, and had studied theatre in the U.S. with black actors and directors there.

In 1975 she worked with Brian Syron to develop a six-week dance training program. This opened with a performance by Pastor Brady's Yelangi Dance Company and Stephen Mam's Torres Strait Island / Waiben Dancers. In 1976 this program grew into a professional dance course for Indigenous Australians, called "Careers in Dance", which became a subsidiary of the Aboriginal Islander Skills Development Scheme (AISDS), with Johnson as founding executive director. (Later, in 1988, this was renamed National Aboriginal Islander Skills Development Association, or NAISDA. The Aboriginal Islander Dance Theatre (AIDT), the first Aboriginal and Torres Strait Islander contemporary dance company, developed out of AISDS, as a student performing group (and later separated from NAISDA).

Over the years, Johnson developed relationships with Yolngu dancers from Yirrkala and Lardil people from Mornington Island (Kunhanha).

In 1988, Johnson left, Raymond D. Blanco became the new head of the organisation, and AISDS was renamed National Aboriginal Islander Skills Development Association (NAISDA).

In 1989, she co-founded, along with Rob Bryant and South-African-born Cheryl Stone, (Note: According to the National Library of Australia catalogue, "Stone was born in South Africa and grew up in Cape Town, moving to Australia as a teenager in 1969. Stone participated in the six-week Black Theatre workshop established by Carole Johnson in Redfern, Sydney in 1975.") Bangarra Dance Theatre, and became its founding artistic director. Stephen Page took over the directorship in 1991, and Johnson continued her work in related venues, dividing her time between Australia and the United States.

== Later work and research ==
In the U.S., Johnson worked at Black Dance conferences in Denver and Philadelphia, and lectured on contemporary Australian Indigenous dance.

In 1994 she returned to Australia to work full-time with the Department of Human Services and Health, (Note: Superseding department name of Department for Community Services.) developing arts workshops for isolated Indigenous communities.

As of May 2021, she was conducting a postgraduate degree by research at the Purai Global Indigenous History Centre of the University of Newcastle in New South Wales. Her thesis is entitled "NAISDA and Indigenous urban Dance in Australia in the 1980s: A story of political activism, community development and transnational cooperation and creativity!".

== Recognition and awards ==
- 1999: Induction into the Hall of Fame, Australian Dance Awards
- 2003: Centenary Medal, "For service to Australian society through dance and the Indigenous community"

== Impact and legacy ==
Many academic and other works cite the influence of Johnson on Indigenous Australian dance as well as the definition of black dance.

== Works ==
With the Eleo Pomare company, Johnson danced in the following works, among others:

- The Angels Are Watching Over Me
- Construction in Green
- From the Soul
- Gin, Woman, Distress, as Bessie Smith
- Jailhouse Blues, as Angela Davis
