= Stephen Page =

Australian choreographer, film director and dancer

Stephen Page AO
- Born: 1965 (age 60–61); Brisbane, Queensland, Australia
- Occupations: Artistic director; dancer; choreographer; film director
- Known for: Bangarra Dance Theatre
- Notable work: Skin, Corroboree, Bennelong
- Relatives: David Page (brother); Russell Page (brother); Hunter Page-Lochard (son)

Stephen George Page AO is an Aboriginal Australian choreographer, film director and former dancer. He was artistic director of the Bangarra Dance Theatre, an Indigenous Australian dance company, from 1991 until 2022. During this time he choreographed or created 33 works for the company, as well as several other major works, including segments of the opening and closing ceremonies of the Sydney Olympic Games. He was artistic director of the 2004 Adelaide Festival of the Arts, and has also done work for theatre and film.

== Early life and education ==
Stephen Page was born in Brisbane in 1965. He was the tenth of 12 children, raised in the Brisbane suburb of Mt Gravatt./> Page is descended from the Nunukul people on his mother's side and the Munaldjali of the Yugambeh people from southeast Queensland, on his father's, but his parents lived in a time where they were not able to celebrate their Aboriginal identity. Page has described his father as a "jack of all trades" and an excellent craftsman.

Page attended the Cavendish Road State High School in Brisbane from 1994 to 1997, and felt fortunate to be able to do so, as all of his older sisters had to leave school at a young age to work and bring in income for the family. There he learnt music and some dance, although did not obtain a Higher School Certificate.

He first worked as a trainee law clerk at the Aboriginal and Torres Strait Island legal service, and he considered going on to study law at university, but was attracted by a poster about an Indigenous dance college. He moved to Sydney when he was 16 and trained with the Aboriginal Islander Dance Theatre, which would later become the National Aboriginal Islander Skills Development Association (NAISDA). He graduated from NAISDA in 1983 after three years, gaining a certificate and diploma. In 1984, Page choreographed his first major work, Warumpi Warumpi, for a choreographic workshop at NAISDA.

== Career ==
=== Early career ===
In 1986 Page was offered work with Graeme Murphy's Sydney Dance Company, performing in After Venice, Wilderness, Nearly Beloved, Shining (1987), Poppy, Company of Wo/men and King Roger. In their 1987 season, Page danced in Sheherezade / Late Afternoon of a Faun / Rumours 1 / Afterworlds at the Sydney Opera House. He also toured to Greece, Italy, Japan, Hong Kong, and Korea with the company,

In 1988, during the bicentenary of Australia and the associated Indigenous activism, Page decided that he did not want to dance in a non-Indigenous company, so went back to NAISDA and became a teacher and choreographer. In that year, he toured with the NAISDA-associated Aboriginal Islander Dance Theatre (AIDT) to Germany and Finland, and he was artistic director of the end-of-year college show, Kayn Walu, in 1989, the year that Bangarra Dance Theatre was founded. The following year, Page co-choreographed Djunba Woman, presented by AIDT at Belvoir St Theatre in Sydney on 1 November 1990. Raymond Blanco was artistic director at that time, and Page's brother David played music for the production.

He did however do further work with Sydney Dance Company and Graeme Murphy, which he credits with teaching him choreography skills. In 1991 he choreographed Trackers of Oxyrhyncus, as well as Mooggrah for the company's season, The Shakespeare Dances.

Also in 1991, he choreographed a sextet for Opera Australia's Marriage of Figaro.

=== Bangarra Dance Theatre ===
In 1991, Page was appointed principal choreographer of Bangarra Dance Theatre, (Note: Bangarra is a Wiradjuri word meaning "to make fire".) and at the end of the year became artistic director. His brothers Russell and David joined Bangarra around the same time. In 1992 he choreographed Praying Mantis Dreaming, Bangarra's first full-length work, which toured widely that year and in 1993 (Canberra, Central Western NSW, Melbourne, Brisbane, China and Hong Kong, Sydney, Cairns, Western Australia, North East Arnhem Land, New York, Los Angeles, and London).

Also in 1996 he made his creative debut with the Australian Ballet, choreographing Alchemy, its score composed by his brother David Page. The following year, he brought the Australian Ballet and Bangarra together in Rites, set to Igor Stravinsky's The Rite of Spring. His choreography for the piece was described as "an easy mix of the various contemporary dance vocabularies that Page had studied in the course of his career, juxtaposed against references to Indigenous dance", with Bangarra's cultural consultant Djakapurra Munyarryun one of the main performers. The National Library of Australia holds photographs of the rehearsals.

He then co-choreographed Ochres (with then Bangarra assistant artistic director Bernadette Walong), telling the story of the earth and the power of the elements. Fish followed the themes of from Ochres, moving onto water. The world premiere of Fish took place on 12 August 1997 at the Edinburgh International Festival. Fish was later adapted by Page for the screen, shown on SBS Television in January 1999.

He choreographed Bangarra's Skin, which premiered at the Sydney Olympic Arts Festival in 2000. Skin consisted of two parts: Shelter, inspired by the work of desert artist Emily Kngwarreye; and Spear, a collaboration with singer-songwriter Archie Roach. and won Helpmann Awards. The work looked at kinship ties across Aboriginal communities.

Bangarra's triple bill Corroboree, choreographed by Page and with music composed by his brother David and Steve Francis, toured internationally in 2001 and 2002, mainly in the US, but was also performed in China and Monaco. It sold out in the US, with performances at Brooklyn Academy of Music in New York and Kennedy Centre in Washington DC. The work earned Page a Helpmann Award for Best Choreography. In 2002, he choreographed Totem for The Australian Ballet's principal dancer, Stephen Heathcote. Also in 2002 came Bangarra's double bill, Walkabout, which premiered at Victorian Arts Centre Playhouse in Melbourne. Page choreographed Rush, while Frances Rings did Rations. It also toured to the Theatre Royal Sydney and the Playhouse, Brisbane.

Bush, co-choreographed by Page and Frances Rings, was staged in Melbourne, Sydney, and Brisbane in 2003; Washington, New York, and Hawaii in 2004 (where it sold out); Japan and New Zealand in 2005; and the UK in 2006.

In 2004, after two performances in Melbourne in April and June, Bangarra returned to the Sydney Opera House on 25 June another sell-out production co-choreographed by Page and Rings, Clan. Clan was a double bill, comprising Unaipon by Rings (who also danced) and Reflections by Page. As for most Bangarra productions, music was by David Page.

In 2005 Page choreographed Boomerang, which was staged in Melbourne, Sydney, and Brisbane.

On 17 March 2006, Page created Gathering for the Australian Ballet and Bangarra, a double bill consisting of a reworked Rites and Amalgamate, staged at The State Theatre in Melbourne.

In September/October 2007, he presented another sell-out season of Kin at the Malthouse Theatre in Melbourne.

In 2008 he created a new, full-length work for Bangarra, entitled Mathinna, inspired by the journey of a young Tasmanian girl between two cultures. Mathinna won a Helpmann Award in 2009 for Best Dance Work and Best Choreography. In September/October 2008, Page took Rites to London and Paris with the Australian Ballet, and Bangarra's Awakenings to Washington, New York, and Ottawa.

In 2009, after returning from a tour of Germany, Hungary, and Austria with True Stories (choreographed by Elma Kris and Frances Rings), (first staged in 2007) Page and the dancers spent 10 days in Arnhem Land on a cultural exchange. In 2009 Page celebrated Bangarra's 20th anniversary with Fire – A Retrospective. This work featured many highlights and memorable performances, from its modest beginnings to its status as a world-renowned dance company.

In 2014, he directed Patyegarang, for Bangarra's 25th anniversary, and in 2016, Nyapanyapa, as part of a triple bill. In 2017 his work Bennelong (based Bennelong), which won another Helpmann Award for Best New Australian Work.

In 2018, Page co-created Dark Emu, with former Bangarra dancers Daniel Riley and Yolande Brown, danced by the current Bangarra ensemble. The work was inspired by Bruce Pascoe's book of the same name, and became the most successful production in Bangarra's history, and was highly critically acclaimed.

In June 2021, Page and Rings choreographed Sandsong, the first public production by the company since the COVID-19 pandemic shutdown in March 2020. The piece honours the legacy of Ningali Josie Lawford-Wolf, who had been a friend and cultural consultant to Bangarra, bringing stories of her Country as a Wangkatjunga woman, the Kimberley region of Western Australia.

In early December 2021, Page announced that he would be stepping down from the role of artistic director of Bangarra at the end of 2022, handing over to Frances Rings from 2023.

Bangarra's last performance with Page as director was Wudjang: Not the Past, which premiered at the Sydney Festival in January 2022 before touring to Hobart, and then Adelaide as part of the Adelaide Festival. He left Bangarra at the end of 2022. He had choreographed or created 33 works for and with Bangarra.

During his time with Bangarra, Page also spent time nurturing young talent through Bangarra's "Rekindling" youth program, a program led by retired senior dancers.

=== Other work ===
In 1996 Page choreographed the flag handover ceremony for the Atlanta Olympic Games, and in 2000 co-directed segments of the opening and closing ceremonies of the Sydney Olympic Games. In the opening ceremony, he co-directed, with Rhoda Roberts, and co-choreographed a segment called Awakening, narrated by Ernie Dingo. There were discussions in the Sydney Aboriginal community about whether to boycott the Olympics, but it was Page's vision that "we needed a presence within the stadium and a true spirit to awaken the ground/ceremony especially for the rest of the world", and he met with Charlie Perkins, Isabel Coe, and others at Redfern Town Hall to thrash out the issues. In the end, the ceremony included 380 women from Central Desert, most of whom had never been to the city before; 500 people from the Kimberley, NE Arnhem Land, and elsewhere; 500 Torres Strait Islander students, and 500 Koori children from secondary schools in NSW.

Page was artistic director of the 2004 Adelaide Festival of the Arts, for which he received acclaim.

In 2006, the Queensland Art Gallery director asked him to create a new dance work for the opening of the Gallery of Modern Art. Along with his son Hunter Page-Lochard and nephews, he created Kin, a special project that opened Asia Pacific Triennial of Contemporary Art.

In the evening of Sunday 18 March 2007, Page directed a traditional smoking ceremony in honour of the historic celebration marking the 75th anniversary of the Sydney Harbour Bridge, after a day-long celebratory event. In August 2007 he directed Victorian Opera's Orphée et Eurydice in Melbourne: "An Italian opera by a German composer, based on a Greek myth, translated into French and directed by an Aboriginal man".

In 2018, Page directed or choreographed work for the 2018 Gold Coast Commonwealth Games. He has also choreographed works for the Australian Football League.

Waru – journey of the small turtle, directed by Page and written by his son Hunter, premiered in Sydney in 2023, and ran for two seasons before going on tour from 26 June to 9 November 2024. It was the first children's work performed by Bangarra, and won Best Production for Children in the Sydney Theatre Awards in 2023.

The 2024 Adelaide Festival commissioned Page to create a work to open the festival, Baleen Moondjan, which was performed on a huge stage in front of huge specially-constructed "whalebones" on the beach at Glenelg. It was Page's first major work since leaving Bangarra, and portrayed the relationships between baleen whales and First Nations totem systems. With music composed by Steve Francis, the performance combined contemporary dance, storytelling, and songs in English, Jandai, and Gumbaynggirr/Yaegl languages. Rapper DOBBY narrated, and actor Elaine Crombie played Gindara. The stories are drawn from his mother's Ngugi, Nunukul, and Moondjan heritage, from Minjerribah/Stradbroke Island in Queensland.

== Theatre and screen ==
Page's theatre credits include directing his own brother, musician David Page, in the one-man show Page 8, which toured Australia and the UK and was produced many times between 2004 and 2014.

Late in 2008, he went to Broome, Western Australia, as choreographer for the film adaptation of Bran Nue Dae, directed by Rachel Perkins.

He worked on the contemporary operatic film Black River, and adapted the 1997 Bangarra work Fish, with the film shown on SBS Television in January 1999.

Page directed the chapter "Sand" in the 2013 feature film The Turning, and also choreographed the feature film The Sapphires (2011).

In 2013, he was associate director on the Sydney Theatre Company's production of Andrew Bovell's play The Secret River, which had its world premiere as part of Sydney Festival in August 2013.

In 2015 his directorial debut feature film, Spear, was shown at the 2015 Toronto International Film Festival. His son, Hunter Page-Lochard, played the lead role as Djali.

== Personal life ==
Page's brother musician David Page (1961–2016) was composer for Bangarra, and younger brother Russell Page (1968–2002), was a dancer and "the muse" for Bangarra. He was deeply affected by their deaths, as shown in the 2020 feature documentary film Firestarter – The Story of Bangarra. He later said that his job "and my creative skills and spirit was probably what saved me through the journey of my brothers both passing", and sees art as medicine.

His son is actor Hunter Page-Lochard (born 1993) whose mother, Cynthia "Sabine" Lochard, is African-American and was a dancer for the New York City Ballet. He also has a stepdaughter, Tamika Walker, daughter of ex-partner Cynthia/Sabine. Page and Lochard separated in around 1998, which he attributes partly to the stress of frequent overseas tours, building Bangarra into a major company, and preparations for the Sydney Olympics. However they have always maintained a respectful relationship. For two years sometime later they lived in a large share house together, co-parenting when they could, with several other women who also stepped in to help.

In May 2023, Page's family history was revealed in an episode (S14.E5) of Who Do You Think You Are? on SBS Television. In it, he met family previously unknown to him, who are South Pacific Islanders.

In November 2023, he was a guest in a podcast by parenting expert Maggie Dent, called The Good Enough Dad, in which he spoke about how being raised by women made him a good father.

== Recognition and honours ==
His alma mater, Cavendish Road State High School, named one of its school houses "Page" in his honour. The house colour is purple, and members call themselves the "Page Pythons".

On 1 January 2001, Page was awarded a Centenary Medal, "for service to Australian society and dance".

In 2008, Page was named New South Wales Australian of the Year, "for his efforts to bring cultures together through art, and his role in mentoring the next generation of Indigenous storytellers and dancers". He received the award from Deputy Premier John Watkins in a ceremony at the Art Gallery of NSW.

In 2015, Page was awarded an honorary doctorate of Creative Arts by the University of Technology Sydney.

In 2016, Martin Portus (former director of marketing and communication at the Australia Council for the Arts) conducted an interview with Page, who discussed significant periods in the history of the Bangarra Dance Theatre, beginning with the nature of his access to traditional cultures, especially in north-east Arnhem Land.

In the 2017 Queen's Birthday Honours (12 June), Page was appointed Officer of the Order of Australia (AO) "for distinguished service to the performing arts and contemporary dance, through enriching Australia's cultural environment, and by presenting Aboriginal and Torres Strait Islander arts to the world".

In 2023 Page was invited to deliver the Andrew Sayers Memorial Lecture at the National Portrait Gallery in Canberra. On 27 April 2023 he gave his address, entitled "Clanship", in which he spoke about cultural connections relating to family, Aboriginal kinship, Aboriginal identity, and relationships with the wider world, including Native American Indians and Canadian First Nations peoples. The lecture was streamed live.

=== Awards and nominations ===
Bangarra Dance Theatre has won numerous awards for their performances, including many Helpmann Awards. Page himself has also won several, including Best Choreography in a Ballet, Dance or Physical Theatre Production as well as Best New Australian Work for Bennelong in 2018. Helpmann and other prominent awards are listed below, followed by a list of other personal awards won by Page.

==== Australian Dance Awards ====
The Australian Dance Awards recognise excellence and promote dance in Australia. They are awarded under the auspices of the Australian Dance Council (Ausdance) for performance, choreography, design, dance writing, teaching and related professions.

Year	Nominee / work	Award	Result (wins only)	Ref.
1997	Stephen Page (Artistic Director of Bangarra Dance Theatre)	Outstanding achievement in choreography	Won	
2010	Stephen Page	Services to Dance	awarded	

==== Deadly Awards ====
The Deadly Awards, (commonly known as The Deadlys), was an annual celebration of Australian Aboriginal and Torres Strait Islander achievement in music, sport, entertainment and community. They ran from 1996 to 2013.

Year	Nominee / work	Award	Result (wins only)	Ref.
Deadly Awards 2008	Stephen Page and Bangarra Dance Theatre	Outstanding Achievement in Entertainment	awarded	
Deadly Awards 2009	Stephen Page and Bangarra Dance Theatre	Achievement in Theatre or Live Performance	Won	

==== Helpmann Awards ====
The Helpmann Awards are a series of awards celebrating live entertainment and performing arts in Australia, presented by industry group Live Performance Australia since 2001. Note: 2020 and 2021 were cancelled due to the COVID-19 pandemic.

Year	Nominee / work	Award	Result	Ref.
2001	Stephen Page for Skin (Bangarra Dance Theatre)	Helpmann Award for Best Choreography in a Ballet or Dance Work	Nominated	
2001	Stephen Page for Skin (Bangarra Dance Theatre)	Helpmann Award for Best New Australian Work	Won	
2002	Stephen Page for Corroboree (Bangarra Dance Theatre)	Best Choreography in a Ballet or Dance Work	Won	
2002	Stephen Page for Corroboree (Bangarra Dance Theatre)	Best New Australian Work	Nominated	
2003	Stephen Page for Walkabout (Bangarra Dance Theatre)	Best New Australian Work	Won	
2003	Stephen Page for Walkabout (Bangarra Dance Theatre)	Helpmann Award for Best Original Score	Won	
2003	Stephen Page and Steven McTaggart "Rush" for Walkabout (Bangarra Dance Theatre)	Best Choreography in a Ballet or Dance Work	Nominated	
2004	Stephen Page for Bush (Bangarra Dance Theatre)	Best Choreography in a Ballet or Dance Work	Nominated	
2009	Stephen Page for Mathinna (Bangarra Dance Theatre)	Best Choreography in a Dance or Physical Theatre Production	Won	
2010	Stephen Page for Fire (Bangarra Dance Theatre)	Best Choreography in a Dance or Physical Theatre Production	Won	
2012	Stephen Page for ID from Belong (Bangarra Dance Theatre)	Best Choreography in a Ballet or Dance Work	Won	
2015	Stephen Page for Patyegarang (Bangarra Dance Theatre)	Best Choreography in a Dance or Physical Theatre Production	Nominated	
2016	Stephen Page, Bernadette Walong-Sene, Djakapurra Munyarryun for Ochres (Bangarra Dance Theatre)	Best Choreography in a Dance or Physical Theatre Work	Nominated	
2016	Stephen Page	JC Williamson Award	awarded	
2018	Stephen Page for Bennelong (Bangarra Dance Theatre)	Best New Australian Work	Won	

==== NAIDOC Awards ====
The NAIDOC Awards are annual Australian awards conferred on Australian Aboriginal and Torres Strait Islander individuals during the national celebration of the history, culture and achievements of Australian Aboriginal and Torres Strait Islander peoples known as NAIDOC Week. (The name is derived from National Aborigines and Islanders Day Observance Committee.)

Year	Nominee / work	Award	Result (wins only)	Ref.
2012	Stephen Page	Artist of the Year	Won	
2016	Stephen Page	Lifetime achievement award	awarded	

==== Other awards ====
Page was also the recipient of many other awards, including:

- 1993: Mo Award for Dance Performance of the Year
- 1993: Paris Opera Screen Award, Grand Prix for Black River (film)
- 2002: Matilda Award for Contribution to the Arts in Queensland
- 2003: Sidney Myer Performing Arts Award, Individual Award
- 2004: Sidney Myer Performing Arts Award, Individual Indigenous Award
- 2017: Australia Council Dance Award
- 2022: Red Ochre Award
- 2022: Inaugural Wendy Blacklock Industry Legend Award, presented by PAC Australia
- 2022: Global Sydney Award

== Footnotes ==
Preceded by Sue Nattrass	Director of the Adelaide Festival of Arts; 2004	Succeeded by Brett Sheehy
