= NAISDA Dance College =

Dance college for Aboriginal Australian students

The NAISDA Dance College (usually referred to as simply NAISDA) is a performing arts training college based in Kariong, New South Wales for Aboriginal and Torres Strait Islander people in Australia. It was established as the Aboriginal Islander Skills Development Scheme (AISDS) in 1975, which became the National Aboriginal and Islander Skills Development Association (NAISDA) in 1988. The date of establishment of the college is usually cited as 1976, although some sources report it as 1975.

The dance troupe Aboriginal Islander Dance Theatre (AIDT) arose in 1976 from AISDS, from which several dancers and choreographers went on to form Bangarra Dance Theatre.

== History ==
=== 1975–1999 ===
The Aboriginal/ Islander Skills Development Scheme was founded by African American dancer Carole Johnson in 1975. She had toured Australia, performing in Adelaide and Sydney, in 1972, as part of the Eleo Pomare Dance Company of New York City, and was commissioned by the Australia Council for the Arts to run dance classes for Aboriginal people in Sydney. After a display performance of Indigenous dance at the Black Theatre in 1975 there was a six-week workshop, the Six Weeks Performing Arts Training Programme, held in Redfern. A performance by Pastor Brady's Yelangi Dance Company and Stephen Mam's Torres Strait Island or Waiben Dancers opened the workshop. Tutors included Johnson (contemporary dance); Eddie Pau and Henry Peters (traditional dance of the Torres Strait Islands and Mornington Island); Brian Syron, with Ann Swan (drama); and others who taught speech, sound and lighting, karate, and writing. The participants in the workshop included John Bayles, Euphemia Bostock, Laurel Briggs, Fred Buckskin, Irene Casey, Betty Colbund, Aileen Corpus, Lillian Crombie, Jack Davis, Christine Donnelly, Elizabeth Duncan, Ros Forgan, Monica Hoffman, Yvette Isaacs, Andrew Jackomos, Rhona Keys, Pearl King, Lorraine Mafi, Shireen Malamoo, Hylus Maris, Zac Martin, Wayne Nicol, Dorathea Randall, Fred Reynolds, Ralph Rigby, Cherie (Cheryl) Stone (co-founder of Bangarra Dance Theatre), Georgina Telfer, Maureen Watson, Roslyn Watson, and Darryl Williams.

After the workshop, a three-year professional course called "Careers in Dance" was created. Preliminary funding for three months was provided by the Department of Education. The Aboriginal Islander Skills Development Scheme was established in 1975 to train Indigenous Australians in dance. It arose from a collaboration of choreographers trained in Western dance styles and cultural custodians of traditional Aboriginal dance, led by Carole Johnson. Its first intake of students, who started in October 1975, were Lillian Crombie, Wayne Nicol, Michael Leslie, Dorathea Randall, Cheryl Stone and Darryl Williams (who had participated in the workshop), and new students Richard Talonga and Roslyn Watson. Torres Strait Islander people were involved from the beginning, owing to strict rules that traditional dances could only be performed if a traditional owner of that dance was present. There was an emphasis on developing a unique style of contemporary Indigenous dancing.

In 1976, Careers in Dance became a subsidiary of the Aboriginal Islander Skills Development Scheme (AISDS), which was established as the National Aboriginal Islander Skills Development Association in 1988, and is now NAISDA Dance College. NAISDA refers to 1976 as its foundation date, although some sources cite 1975.

Founding members of NAISDA, apart from Johnson, were Lucy Jumawan from the Philippines, the principal teacher, and students Lillian Crombie, Wayne Nicol, Dorathea Randall, Cheryl Stone, Darryl Williams, Michael Leslie, Richard Talonga, Malcolm Cole, Kim Walker and Philip Langley. Over the years, Johnson engaged many other dancers and choreographers from around Australia and worldwide, and together they developed what is now known as Contemporary Indigenous Dance Technique.

The Aboriginal Islander Dance Theatre (AIDT), which arose out of NAISDA in 1976 and comprising NAISDA students, was the first contemporary Indigenous Australian dance company. It toured nationally and internationally, becoming known as the most toured dance company in Australia. AIDT remained a part of the NAISDA under the artistic direction from 1989 of Raymond D. Blanco, former student of NAISDA and the first Indigenous person to lead a dance company in Australia. It disbanded following the departure of Blanco in 1998.

Johnson founded Bangarra Dance Theatre in 1989, with Stephen Page taking the reins in 1991.

In 1997, NAISDA achieved the status of registered training organisation, and became a founding member of the federal government's "Australian Roundtable for Arts Training Excellence" (ARTS8), comprising a number of "elite training institutions" directly funded by the Office for the Arts. It was intended that Johnson's vision of training style should persist.

=== 2000–present ===
Until 2007, NAISDA was located in the inner Sydney suburbs of Redfern, Glebe and then The Rocks, before moving to their present location in the Mt Penang Parklands, near Gosford. Shortly after the move, former student Kim Walker was appointed Executive Director and Head of Dance. the board appointed alumnus Kim Walker as Executive Director and Head of Dance.

As of 2008, NAISDA was funded as an arts education "Centre of Excellence" by the Australian Government and was also supported by the New South Wales Government. It was a registered training organisation (RTO) offering Certificates II, III and IV and a Diploma in Careers in Dance, and was a member of the Australian Roundtable for Arts Training Excellence.

Between 2008 and 2010, Walker, in close collaboration with the NAISDA Performing Arts Advisory Committee, developed a new curriculum, which was implemented in 2011. In March 2012 a new building, housing a number of purpose-built studios, was opened. In 2016, founder Carole Johnson, along with three college graduates, undertook a six-week performing tour of the United States. Also in 2016, NSW Arts Minister Leslie Williams announced A$59,000 of new funding for NAISDA.

In November–December 2016, the 40th anniversary of NAISDA was celebrated in an exhibition at Carriageworks at Redfern. Naya Wa Yugali ("We Dance" in Darkinyung language) featured oral histories, photographs, film footage and artwork by Tracey Moffatt, Michael Riley, Juno Gemes, Lee Chittick and Elaine Kitchener as well as a specially commissioned work by Vicki Van Hout and Marian Abboud. An auction was held to help raise funds for the planned new international college, Naya Wa Yugali.

NAISDA has built close ties with Badu and Saibai Islands in the Torres Strait, Elcho Island and Yirrkala (NT), and Turkey Creek (WA).

== Description and governance ==
NAISDA is based in Mount Penang Parklands in Kariong on the Central Coast of New South Wales, on Darkinjung land. Graduates have worked in arts management, dance, music, theatre and film, both at the elite and community level.

As of 2021, NAISDA Ltd is a limited company that runs the Dance College, and is governed by a board which includes Wesley Enoch and Elizabeth Butcher AM and is chaired by Maryah Sonter. The NAISDA Foundation is a separate fund-raising entity, whose patron since its establishment in December 2013 is Dame Marie Bashir AD CVO. It continues to be funded by the Australian and New South Wales Governments. Its funding as one of the ARTS8 group of eight elite training organisations in the performing arts is through the Office for the Arts.

NAISDA achieves a completion rate of around 84 per cent, compared with the national rate for completion of 34 per cent in the VET sector.

== Future plans ==
Plans are under way for new international art education centre, Naya Wa Yugali (meaning "we dance" in Darkinjung language) to be built adjacent to the current campus. Plans include an expanded curriculum of accredited courses across the creative industry, helping to increase the number of qualified artists and leaders. It will also provide training and retraining for people already in industry, and will include a program of "open courses, classes, concerts, performances, arts exchange forums, school programs, outreach and engagement opportunities for our regional, national and international communities".

== In film and television ==
NAISDA was the subject of an ABC Television documentary, From Dreamtime to Dance, narrated by Stan Grant and broadcast in 2002.

The school features in "NAISDA with Monica Stevens", an episode in the 2013 documentary television series Desperate Measures. Monica Stevens is a choreographer and was a student at NAISDA and a notable member of AIDT in the 1980s. The series is available on SBS on Demand.

== People ==
=== Malcolm Cole ===
Malcolm Cole (1949-1995), was an Aboriginal and South Sea Islander man from Ayr in Far North Queensland, later a teacher and counsellor at the college. He is especially remembered for his participation in the 1988 Sydney Mardi Gras, in which he took the role of Captain Cook in an enactment of the First Fleet landing, in which a boatful of black sailors was pulled by a white man. This was the first ever Aboriginal float entry in the parade. Along with Lillian Crombie, he was the first co-presenter for the ABC Television's Blackout in 1989. He also taught dance as an artist in residence at many Australian schools.

He discovered he was HIV-positive in 1988, and was shunned by all of his Sydney friends, but was cared for by his family when he became ill. He died of HIV/AIDS in 1995 at the home of his twin brother, Robert, in Currajong, a suburb of Townsville. Robert recreated Malcolm's costume in order to wear it in the 2024 Mardi Gras parade, to commemorate his brother.

His legacy includes the Malcolm Cole Aboriginal and Torres Strait Islander Performing Arts Scholarship at the University of New South Wales; the Alexandria Public School weekly awards called "Malcolms"; and Malcolm Cole Terrace in the Canberra suburb of Whitlam.

Cole is also commemorated by a 20-metre (66 ft) high mural of him dressed in the Captain Cook costume at White Bay Power Station in Sydney, as part of the 2024 Biennale of Sydney. The mural was painted by Dylan Mooney, a 28-year-old Torres Strait and South Sea Islander. The artist, along with Malcolm's brother Robert, participated in a panel as part of the Biennale, which reflected on his legacy as an unapologetic gay man and a trailblazer. A segment on ABC TV's evening current affairs programme, 7.30, on 4 March 2024 covers Robert's appearance in the parade.

=== Staff ===
Other teachers not mentioned above, among many others, included David Gulpilil and Larry Gurruwiwi.

=== Prominent alumni ===
Wayne Nicol and Dorathea Randall were the first Aboriginal and Torres Strait Islander choreographers who graduated from NAISDA.

Other notable alumni include:

- Christine Anu
- Lillian Crombie
- Gary Lang (of NT Dance Company)
- Stephen Page
- Russell Page

== See also ==
- National Black Theatre (Australia)
