= Michael Leslie (dancer) =

Australian choreographer and dancer

Michael Leslie is an Indigenous Australian dancer and choreographer.

== Career and achievements ==
Leslie was part of a team which created the following organisations: the Aboriginal Centre for the Performing Arts; the Black Swan Theatre Company; Marrugeku Physical Theatre; and the NAISDA Dance College. He also created the Michael Leslie Pilbara Performing Arts Program to expose local children to the performing arts.

In 1993, he choreographed the first Aboriginal Australian musical, Bran Nue Dae.

In 2018, he performed at the Ochre Contemporary Dance Company's Australian Premiere Season of 3 point 3.

== Recognition ==
In 1979 Leslie was awarded the Churchill Fellowship to further his studies, which he used in 1981.

In 2010 he received the Red Ochre Award from the Australia Council for the Arts, receiving A$50,000.
