= Lousy Little Sixpence =

- Directed by: Alec Morgan
- Produced by: Alec Morgan; Gerald Bostock
- Cinematography: Martha Ansara; James Grant; Alessandro Cavadini; Fabio Cavadini
- Edited by: John Scott; Rhonda MacGregor
- Music by: Ralph Schneider
- Distributed by: Ronin Films
- Release date: 29 September 1983
- Running time: 54 minutes
- Country: Australia
- Language: English

Lousy Little Sixpence is a 1983 Australian documentary film about Australian history that details the early years of the Stolen Generations and the struggle of Aboriginal Australians against the Aboriginal Protection Board in the 1930s. The film's title references the amount of pocket money that Aboriginal children were to be paid for their forced labour, although few ever received it.

== Overview ==
Lousy Little Sixpence begins with the testimonies of survivors of the Stolen Generations who were born in the early 1900s. Later, the film documents the work of Jack Patten and the Aborigines Progressive Association in the 1930s, and ends with the Day of Mourning on 26 January 1938, which marked 150 years of European settlement in Australia.

== Production ==
Lousy Little Sixpence took three years to research and produce. In the early stages of production, the film's producers Alec Morgan and Gerry Bostock travelled through New South Wales and Victoria while receiving unemployment benefits, looking for information on the Stolen Generations to include such as newspaper articles, films and photographs.

The film screened for six weeks at Dendy cinemas in Sydney.

== Restoration ==
The National Film and Sound Archive restored the film to digital quality in 2023. They also held an interview with director Alec Morgan about the film.

== Cast ==
- Margaret Tucker as herself
- Bill Reid as himself
- Geraldine Briggs as herself
- Flo Caldwell as herself
- Violet Shea as herself
- Chicka Dixon as Narrator

== See also ==
- Stolen Generations
- Day of Mourning (Australia)
- Aborigines Progressive Association
- Aboriginal Protection Board
