= Black Words, White Page =

1989 book by Adam Shoemaker

- Author: Adam Shoemaker
- Subject: Indigenous Australian literature
- Publisher: University of Queensland Press
- Publication date: 1989
- Publication place: Australia
- ISBN: 9780702221491

Black Words, White Page is a 1989 non-fiction book about Indigenous Australian literature by the Canadian-Australian academic Adam Shoemaker. The book was written based on research that Shoemaker had conducted for his doctoral degree in Aboriginal literature at the Australian National University, including interviews conducted with the Aboriginal authors Oodgeroo Noonuccal, Gerry Bostock, and John Newfong. It was published by the University of Queensland Press in 1989, and saw new editions in 1992 and 2004. The book has been described as one of the first detailed historical studies of Indigenous Australian literature.

== Summary ==
Black Words, White Page traces the history of English-language Aboriginal writing, beginning with the 1929 publication of David Unaipon's Native Legends. It goes on to analyse how white Australians authors wrote about Aboriginal Australians between the 1930s and early 1960s, including in the works of Judith Wright, Randolph Stow, and Patrick White. Simultaneously, the book traces Australian policy towards Aboriginal Australians and the community's socioeconomic standing during this era. It concludes with a study of writing by Aboriginal authors published between 1963 and 1988, with chapters on a series of themes and genres of Aboriginal writing.

In Black Words, White Page, Shoemaker argues that Aboriginal literature has a distinct character and cannot be judged solely according to Western standards. The book analyses Aboriginal Australian writing in the context of other literatures that Shoemaker terms "Fourth World", including Indigenous Canadian writing. Shoemaker draws links between the themes and styles of Aboriginal writing, and Aboriginal political history.

== Publication history ==
Shoemaker grew up in Canada and came to Australia to complete a PhD in Aboriginal literature at the Australian National University in 1980. He wrote Black Words, White Page based on research conducted as part of his PhD. Shoemaker spent several years interviewing Aboriginal authors, including Oodgeroo Noonuccal, Gerry Bostock, Candy Williams, John Newfong, and Faith Bandler, and includes excerpts from these interviews in his book. The book was published in 1989 by the University of Queensland Press as part of its series "UQP Studies in Australian Literature". New editions of Black Words, White Page were published in 1992 and 2004.

== Reception ==
Reviewers of Black Words, White Page held differing interpretations of the relationship between Shoemaker, a non-Indigenous author, and the book's subject matter. The writer Veronica Brady wrote that while Black Words, White Page was an important work, the complexity and scope of the topic was so great that the book was unable to fully break down the barrier between Aboriginal and non-Aboriginal lived experience. She suggests that the book imposes an outside framework laden with assumptions onto Aboriginal writers, describing the book as "unquestioningly Eurocentric" and lacking acknowledgement of the distinct intentions and perceptions of Aboriginal writers. Eva Rask Knudsen, in contrast, wrote that Shoemaker handled his subject matter with tact and allowed Aboriginal writers to speak for themselves by adopting the position of an intermediary. To Knudsen, the book makes a persuasive argument for the uniqueness of Aboriginal Australian writing. To the scholar J. J. Healy, Shoemaker takes on the role of an apologist and guide to the landscape of Indigenous writing, while occasionally adopting the role of a "great Protector" who attempts to shield Aboriginal literature from unwarranted white criticism.

Brady argues that the book challenges stereotypes of Aboriginal illiteracy and ignorance by demonstrating the diversity of Aboriginal writing and placing it in a broader historical context. Knudsen adds that the book provides particular insight into the writing of David Unaipon, as well as the connections between Aboriginal writing and political history. The scholar of Australian literature Gay Raines wrote that the book was notable for placing a diverse body of Aboriginal Australian literature in the context of political struggle, and that in doing so Shoemaker had demonstrated that the works featured a "common theme of a search for identity". Reviewers of the book commented on Shoemaker's position as an outsider, with Healy writing that the most interesting aspect of the book was the open communication between the Aboriginal interviewees and Shoemaker, a "Canadian Crusoe" exploring an unfamiliar cultural context. Healy analysed the book in terms of a dialogue between Shoemaker and his interviewees, arguing that while Shoemaker was comfortable in his analysis of the writings of deceased or well-established authors like Unaipon and Noonuccal, he exhibited a degree of unease in his commentary on some Aboriginal authors' writing.

The book won the Walter McRae Russell Award, awarded by the Association for the Study of Australian Literature for the best first book of literary criticism. The writer Veronica Brady has described Black Words, White Page as "the first historical overview of Aboriginal writing". The literary scholar David Carter writes that the book helped to define Aboriginal literature as a distinct topic of study within the scope of Australian literature. Knudsen describes the book as "the first comprehensive and full-length study of black Australian literature".
