= Ben Ferris (disambiguation) =

Ben Ferris may refer to:

- Ben Ferris (musician), Former keyboardist of Woe, Is Me
- Ben Ferris (filmmaker), Australian filmmaker
