= Protected (film) =

- Directed by: Alessandro Cavadini
- Produced by: Carolyn Strachan
- Starring: Don Brady (narrator); Robert Hughes (narrator)
- Cinematography: Fabio Cavadini
- Edited by: Rhonda Mac Gregor
- Release date: 11 November 1975
- Running time: 55 minutes
- Country: Australia
- Language: English

Protected is a 1975 documentary film, narrated by Don Brady and Sydney-born producer Robert Hughes.

The film was directed by Alessandro Cavadini (who also made Ningla A-Na, about the Aboriginal Tent Embassy). It was an exposé of the ill-treatment of Aboriginal workers by white men. The details of what life was like for Aboriginal Australians on Palm Island became more widely known when Alessandro Cavadini and Carolyn Strachan recreated the strike in 1957 by hundreds of the Island's residents even though there was huge resistance from local authorities.

Some 22 years later in 2007, Aboriginal activist, and convicted Palm Island rioter Lex Wotton presented a screening of the film to the Film Fanatics Society at Petersham Bowling Club. He recalled watching the film as a schoolboy and seeing his father on film. He said that screening opened his eyes to the way "things were different on Palm". He also said "There are numerous things that people haven't documented but this [film] was one thing that brought what was happening to the indigenous people to the attention of the wider community.
