= Untitled Earth Sim 64 =

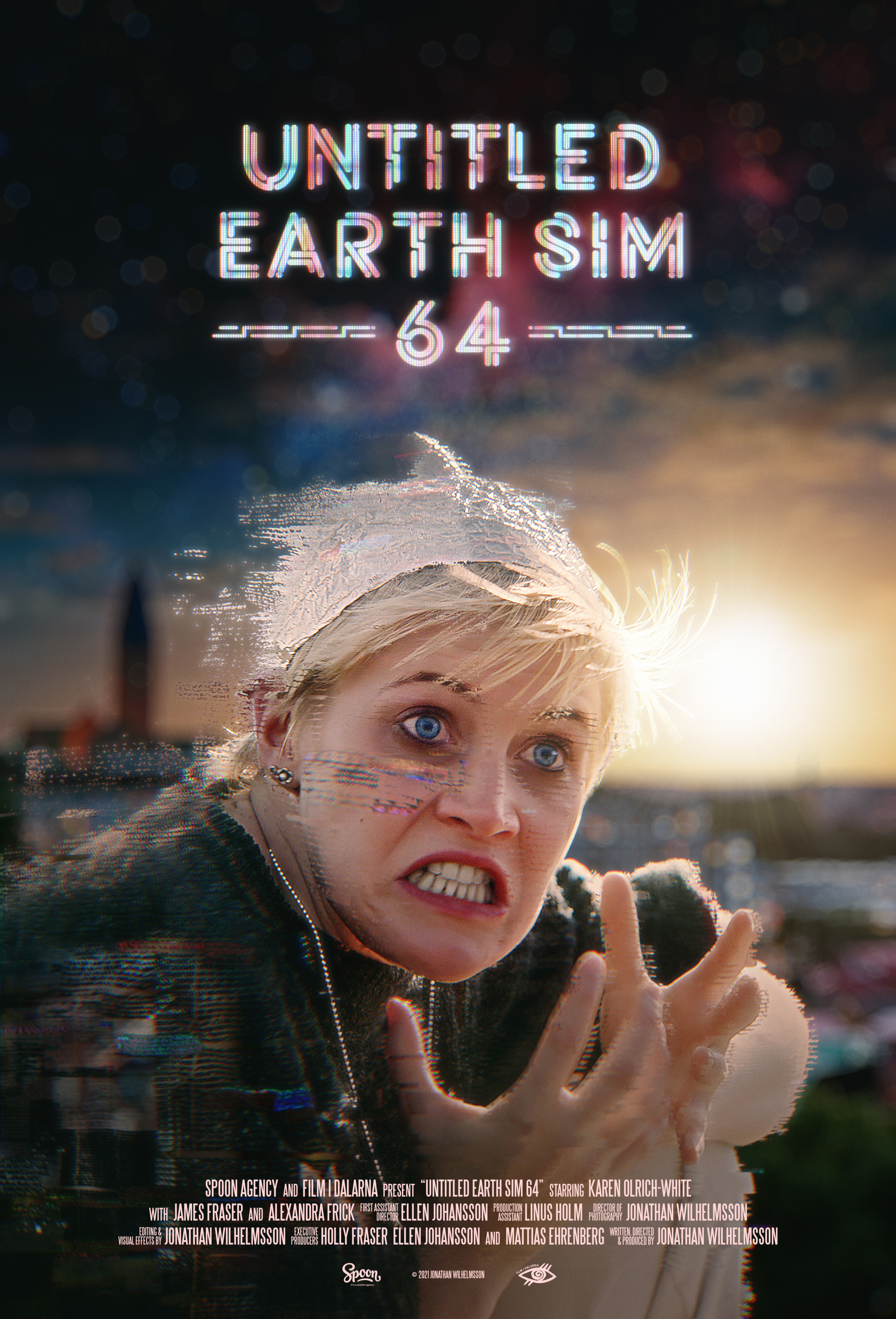
- Theatrical release poster
- Directed by: Jonathan Wilhelmsson
- Written by: Jonathan Wilhelmsson
- Produced by: Jonathan Wilhelmsson; Holly Fraser; Ellen Johansson; Mattias Ehrenberg
- Starring: Karen Olrich-White; Alexandra Frick; James Fraser
- Cinematography: Jonathan Wilhelmsson
- Edited by: Jonathan Wilhelmsson
- Production companies: Spoon Agency; Film i Dalarna
- Release date: 3 May 2021
- Running time: 6 minutes
- Country: Sweden
- Language: English
- Budget: 15000 SEK

Untitled Earth Sim 64 is a 2021 science-fiction comedy short film written and directed by Jonathan Wilhelmsson (who previously made Waltzing Tilda). The story is about Marie, a woman who comes to learn that her universe is an untitled simulation. The film was shot in Gothenburg, Sweden, and was released in May 2021 along with a behind the scenes documentary on the making of the film. It was later released by Gunpowder & Sky under their science-fiction label Dust.

== Plot ==
Marie is an offbeat woman who suspects that all is not right with the world. After experiencing various glitches in reality, she is called upon by a mysterious being that accidentally lets slip that her universe is a simulation. Marie's life quickly unravels at this revelation, as she desperately looks for meaning in an untitled simulation.

== Cast ==
- Karen Olrich-White as Marie
- Alexandra Frick as Friend
- James Fraser as The Researcher (voice)
