= Gerry Bostock =

Bundjalung playwright (1942–2014)

Gerry Bostock (15 July 1942 – 16 May 2014) was a Bundjalung activist, playwright, poet and filmmaker. He is best known for being a founding member of Sydney's National Black Theatre and for his work as a film producer. He produced the 1983 documentary Lousy Little Sixpence about the treatment of Aboriginal Australians.

== Early life ==
Bostock was born in 1942 in New South Wales, of the Bundjalung people. He had a brother, Lester. Bostock joined the Australian Army in adulthood and served for nine years, including a tour of service overseas. After exiting the service, he moved to Redfern, where he was a founding member of the National Black Theatre along with his brother.

== Career ==
His 1976 his play Here Comes the Nigger was performed at the Black Theatre Arts and Culture Centre in Redfern, starring Athol Compton and Julie McGregor, with Marcia Langton in a supporting role. Many of the cast were involved in the Black Women's Action group and its monthly publication Koori Bina. During one performance of the play, a group of audience members attempted to climb onto the stage to interfere in the events, which Bostock attributed to the emotional power of the performance. Also in 1976, Bostock wrote his poem "Black Children," which he said was inspired by the Aboriginal Tent Embassy.

The following year the theater shut down and Bostock moved on to other ventures, primarily filmmaking. He began working for Film Australia in 1977 and founded his own production company, Kuri Productions, in 1985. With Alec Morgan, he produced the 1983 documentary, Lousy Little Sixpence, which covers the treatment of Aboriginal Australians from 1900 to 1946.

== Later life and legacy ==
In 1986, Bostock became a Kurradji, or traditional healer. Bostock was on the organizing committee for the Sydney Writers' Festival in 1994 and 1995. He died in 2014.

Adam Shoemaker, in his 2004 book Black Words White Page, described Bostock as being part of a group of Aboriginal poets who were influenced by African-American Vernacular English alongside Lionel Fogarty and Aileen Corpus.
