= John Newfong =

Australian journalist (1943–1999)

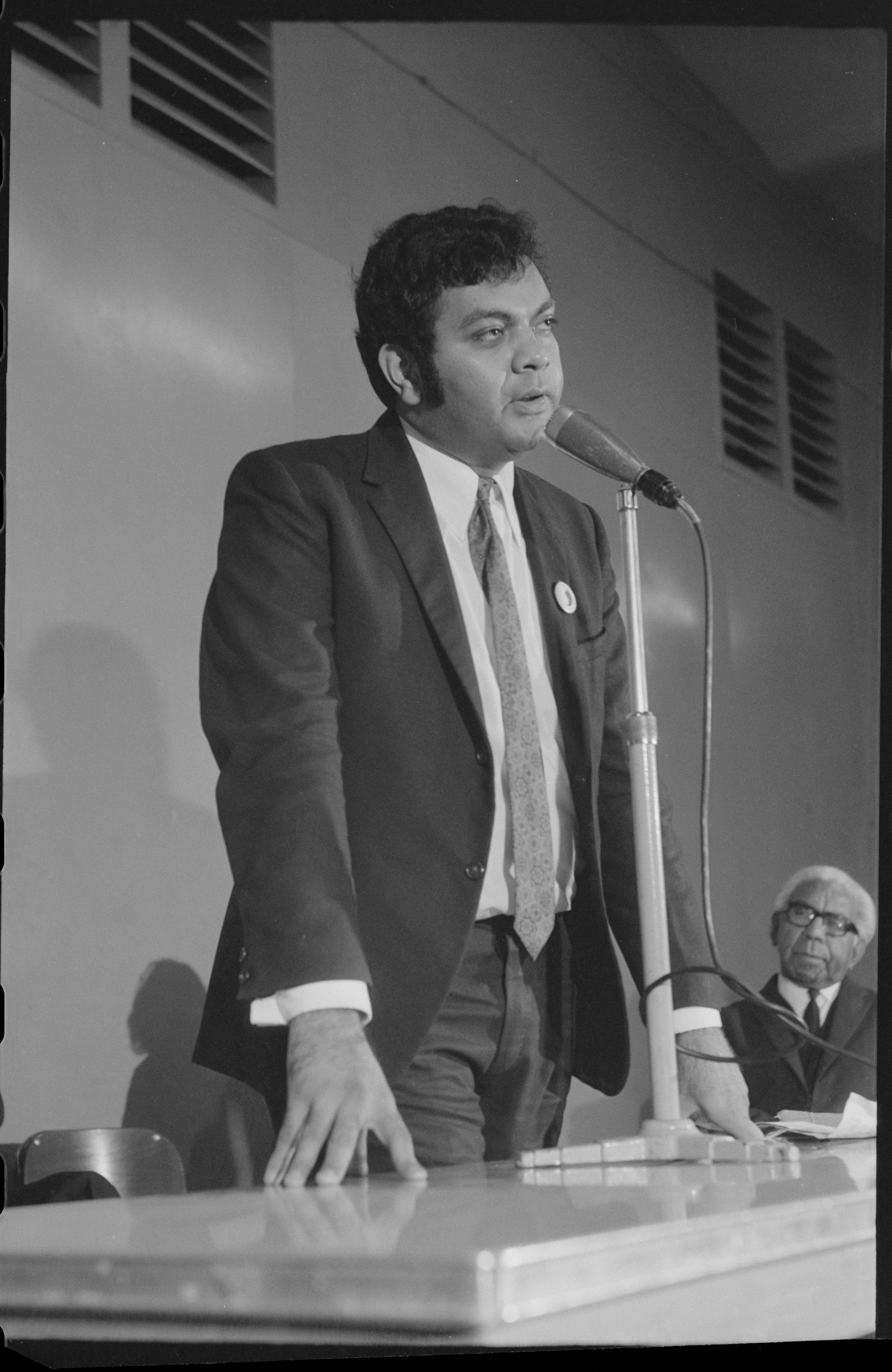
- Sydney, 1970
- Born: 3 November 1943
- Died: 30 May 1999 (aged 55)
- Known for: Journalism, Indigenous rights activism

John Archibald Newfong (3 November 1943 – 30 May 1999) was an Aboriginal Australian journalist and writer. A descendant of the Ngugi people of Moreton Bay, he was the first Aboriginal person to be employed as a journalist in the mainstream print media in Australia.

== Early life ==
Newfong was born on 3 November 1943 in Wynnum, a suburb of Brisbane, Queensland. His father, Ben "Archie" Archibald Nu Fong, was a Queensland champion heavyweight boxer, and his mother, Edna Crouch, played in the Australian women's cricket team which played England in 1935.

Newfong's family moved to North Stradbroke Island but, when Newfong was five, the family returned to Wynnum, where he attended the local school, and later, Wynnum High School. After graduating in 1961, he wanted to study law; however, entrance to university at the time would only allow Aboriginal people to undertake education degrees to become teachers, and only if they chose to teach in a community. He instead worked in Mount Isa as a miner in 1965.

He also took a job in the ABC mailroom in Brisbane, worked as a proofreader, and wrote TV reviews for the Sydney Daily Mirror. He studied typography, graphic design and fashion.

== Politics ==
Straight after leaving school, Newfong joined a student group and joined the Aborigines Advancement League in Victoria.

Newfong was the campaign secretary for the Queensland Council for the Advancement of Aborigines and Torres Strait Islanders, the state affiliate of the Federal Council for the Advancement of Aborigines and Torres Strait Islanders (FCAATSI), in the lead-up to the 1967 referendum. He had joined the Queensland council in 1961, and was soon promoted to the federal council.

In 1970, he was elected as the national (general) secretary of FCAATSI and, in the same year was involved in protests against celebrating the bicentennial of Captain Cook's visit to Australia. He resigned from the FCAATSI position after a few months.

In 1972, Newfong was made the "chief spokesperson" for the Aboriginal Tent Embassy on the lawns of Old Parliament House in Canberra, where his media contacts and experience in the Canberra press corps were crucial in establishing a public image for the embassy. His political allies here included Gary Foley, Charles Perkins, Paul Coe, Isabel Coe, Gordon Briscoe and Chicka Dixon. Although he resided at the embassy, which was established as a land rights protest, from February until July and was quoted frequently in The Australian and overseas press, he is best remembered for his quote, "The Mission has come to town".

Newfong was known to be extremely knowledgeable on African matters. He was one of the first people in the Aboriginal movement to realise the importance of international pressure on Australia, especially from the African nations. During the 1960s, he was heavily influenced by overseas independence movements in removing colonial overrule. He was the only Aboriginal speaker at the Black Moratorium to speak specifically about the influence that multinational corporations had on the Australian government in relation to Aboriginal policy.

He was the elected member for the South East Queensland / Brisbane metropolitan of the National Aboriginal Conference (NAC) in 1977, and was a member of its executive until 1979.

== Journalism ==
Soon after the 1967 referendum, Newfong was offered a cadetship at The Sydney Morning Herald newspaper in Sydney, and later worked at The Australian.

Newfong's was the inaugural editor and principal writer of Identity from 1972 to 1973 and 1979 to 1980. This was an Indigenous Australian magazine funded by the Aboriginal Publications Foundation. According to Marcia Langton, the publication became "enormously influential" under his leadership. Newfong published a five-point plan for land rights in the magazine.

He became involved in Koori Bina, a monthly newspaper published by Black Women's Action from 1976 to 1979, helping the inexperienced young women in its production.

Throughout the 1980s and 1990s, he contributed to a long list of publications.

== Other roles ==
He was a board member of the Aboriginal Arts Advisory Committee between 1969 and 1970 and board member of the Aboriginal Publications Foundation.

Newfong was the public relations director of the Aboriginal Medical Service in the Sydney suburb of Redfern from 1975. He maintained an ongoing concern for Indigenous health throughout his life.

He also did public relations work for Channel Nine (Cyclone Tracy phone line), the New South Wales Society for Crippled Children and National Aboriginal and Islander Health Organisation.

He became a adviser and speechwriter for the New South Wales Government, and head of public relations at the Aboriginal Development Commission.

Writing in The Australian in 1986, Newfong defended Aboriginal legal services from attacks by the Police Federation of Australia, who criticised government funding for those services.

In 1993, Newfong was a lecturer at James Cook University in Townsville, where he taught journalism and media studies. The following year, Newfong was briefly Aboriginal policy officer for the Australian Medical Association in Canberra.

He served on the board of the Public Broadcasting Foundation, assisting with the expansion of Aboriginal radio.

== Later life, death and legacy ==
Until his death in 1999, Newfong lectured at various Australian universities on Indigenous health and government relations.

In November 2018, he was inducted into Australia's Media Hall of Fame.

In the annual Kennedy Awards, named after crime reporter Les Kennedy, the prize for outstanding Indigenous affairs reporting was named the John Newfong Award.

Adrian Atkins is writing Newfong's official anthology.
