= Frontyard Films =

Australian film production company

Frontyard Films is an Australian film production company that makes documentary films, owned by Australian documentary filmmakers Amanda King and Fabio Cavadini. Their films include An Evergreen Island, Starting from Zero and A Thousand Different Angles.

== Background ==
=== Fabio Cavadini ===
Cavadini came to Australia from northern Italy, where he was a dental technician, in 1969. He had grown up mainly in Switzerland and came to Australia at the urging of his brother, Alessandro Cavadini, who made Ningla A-Na, a documentary about the setting up of the Aboriginal Tent Embassy in 1972. Fabio met Bob Maza, Gary Foley and others who were involved in Basically Black, an Aboriginal comedy revue which was also made into a TV program. Alessandro and his then partner, Caroline Strachan, raised the money to make a film on Palm Island, Protected, for which Fabio did the camerawork. They subsequently made a short film called We Stop Here (1977), about the Dyirbal people of the upper reaches of the Murray River in Queensland. Cavadini co-directed Buried Alive, the Story of East Timor with Gil Scrine and Ron Hibberd, for which he shadowed José Ramos Horta around the world, filming him.

=== Amanda King ===
King went to art school in Newcastle, New South Wales from 1973 to 1977, intending to become an art teacher. Film courses had not yet been established, but they did some basic training in how to make videos. She became involved as an activist with the invasion of East Timor in 1975, particularly after the death of the Balibo Five. Moving to Sydney later, she teamed up with filmmaker Martha Ansara around 1985, who had been approached by Ramos Horta to make a film about him. With input from journalist Denis Freney, King and James Kesteven co-directed The Shadow Over East Timor (1987). The film was released on SBS Television just months before the Dili massacre in November 1991, and received much publicity; Cavadini's Buried Alive had been screened on ABC Television in the preceding year. It was nominated for an AFI Award for Best Television Documentary in 1991.

=== Other roles ===
King and Cavadini were founding faculty members of the Sydney Film School, where they both taught documentary filmmaking from 2004 until at least 2015.

== Description ==
Frontyard Films is owned by King and Cavadini.

== Filmography ==
=== An Evergreen Island ===
An Evergreen Island (2000) depicts life on the Pacific island of Bougainville under a military blockade. Filmmakers Amanda King and Fabio Cavadini document the resilience of a people surviving for years with virtually no trade or contact with the outside world. The film was a finalist in Short Form Documentary at Australia's 2008 ATOM Awards.

=== Starting From Zero ===
Starting From Zero (2002) followed the challenges faced by three exiled East Timorese on returning to their devastated homeland, during its transition into the independent country of Timor Leste. The project was made possible by funding from the Australian Film Commission and SBS TV, Australia. Starting from Zero aired on the A&E Network in the US, and received honours at the US International Film and Video Festival.

=== A Thousand Different Angles ===
Frontyard Films' A Thousand Different Angles (2010) surveys the work and artistic philosophies of Melbourne sculptor Inge King, a WWII refugee who was one of the influential “Centre 5” group of Australian sculptors. The production, featuring an original jazz score, debuted on ABC TV, Australia in 2010.

== Festival screenings ==
Documentaries by Frontyard Films have screened at festivals, theatres and museums in Australia, Canada, England, Greece, India, New Zealand, South Africa, and the United States, as well as on television.
