= Naomi Mayers =

Indigenous Australian health pioneer (born 1941)

Naomi Mayers OAM (born 1941) is a leader in Australian health. She is also known for having been lead vocalist of the music group The Sapphires, on which a popular 2012 film of the same name was based.

== Early life ==
Mayers was born in 1941, of Yorta Yorta and Wiradjuri heritage.

She was one of three members of The Sapphires, along with Beverly Briggs (her sister) and Laurel Robinson, in the 1960s. She and Briggs chose not to travel with the group to Vietnam, owing to their opposition to the Vietnam War.

== Career in health ==
She became involved in the foundation of the Aboriginal Medical Service in 1971, encouraged by Fred Hollows. She was officially appointed as coordinator in 1972, with fellow Sapphires Robinson and Briggs joining the service later. She had had some nursing experience, and started as an administrator. Mayers helped to lead the institution over the following 40 years, with the help of people like Dulcie Flowers and "Mum Shirl" (Shirley Smith), in 2012 she was CEO of the organisation.

She is regarded as a leader in Aboriginal health services.

In 1976 Mayers, Bobbi Sykes, Sue Chilly (also spelt Chilli), and Marcia Langton formed the Black Women's Action (BWA) group, which later evolved into the Roberta Sykes Foundation. BWA published a monthly community newspaper for Aboriginal people, Koori Bina (meaning "Black ears"), which ran until June 1979.

In 1989, Mayers was the lead author of a government strategy document, "A national Aboriginal health strategy".

== Recognition and honours ==
In 1984 Mayers was awarded the Medal of the Order of Australia for "service to Aboriginal welfare".

In 2006, she was the subject of a television documentary made by Film Australia for SBS Television, entitled Jetja Nai medical mob : Naomi Mayers.

Mayers was given a Lifetime Achievement award in the 2023 NAIDOC Week Awards. This is awarded "to an Aboriginal and Torres Strait Islander person who has dedicated their life to their community".
