= Australia Day 2012 protests =

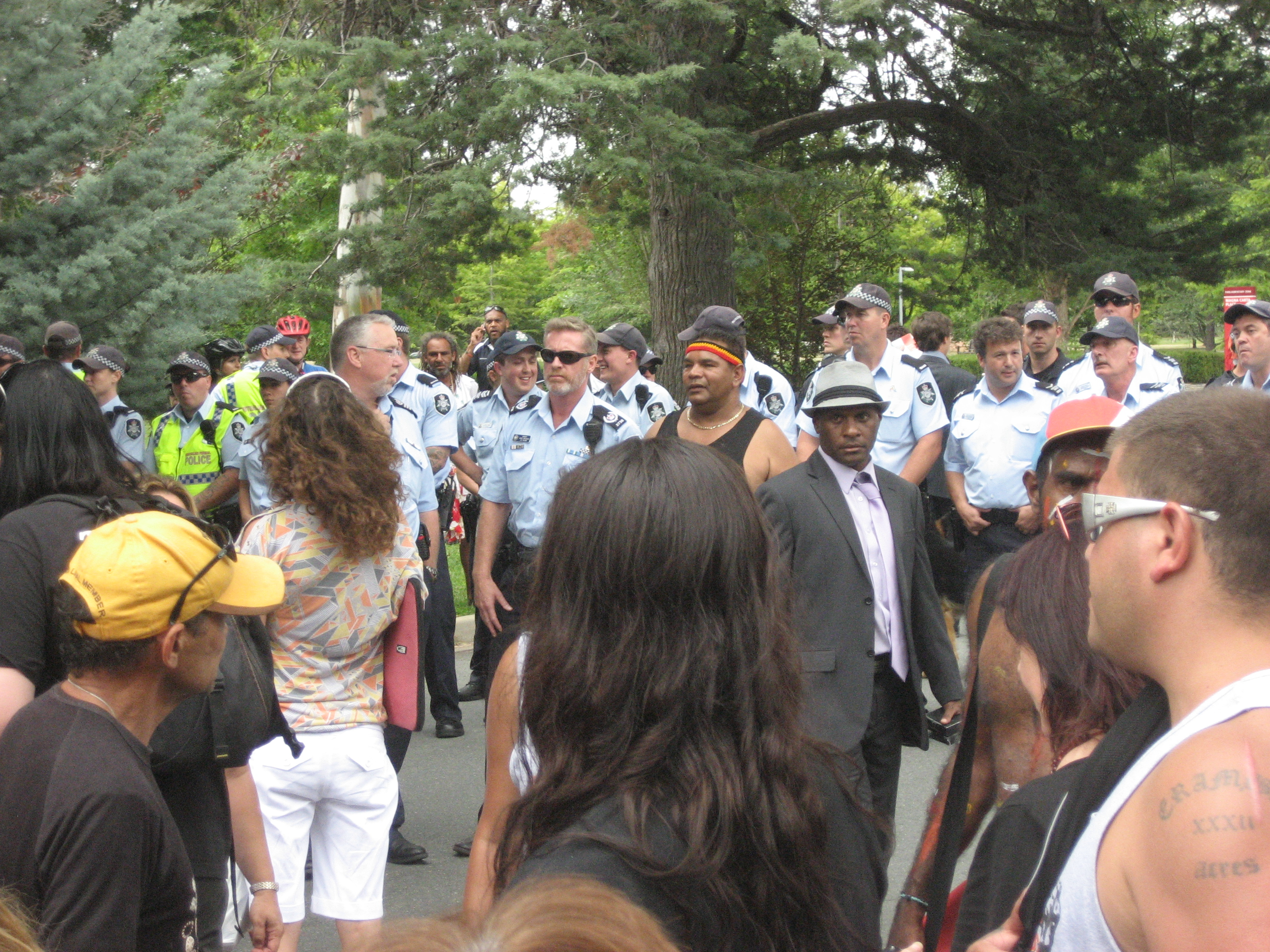
Australia Day Aboriginal Tent Embassy Protest

The Australia Day Protests of 2012 began with a commemoration at the Aboriginal Tent Embassy in Canberra to mark its 40th anniversary and culminated in a security scare which saw the Prime Minister and Opposition Leader of Australia escorted from a nearby Canberra venue amidst rowdy protesters. The protesters had been advised of the leaders' whereabouts and misinformed of a statement by the opposition leader in relation to the Tent Embassy by a union official who had received information about Abbott's statement and whereabouts from the prime minister's office.

Gillard and Abbott were temporarily trapped when around 100 protesters surrounded the venue. The security scare made international headlines and saw Prime Minister Julia Gillard stumble and lose her shoe as she was carried by a body guard to her car.

== Background ==
On Thursday 26 January 2012, Australia Day, the Aboriginal Tent Embassy in Canberra staged a 40th Anniversary celebration. That morning, the Australian Leader of the Opposition, Tony Abbott was interviewed and asked if the Aboriginal Tent Embassy was still relevant or if it should be moved. He replied,

Look, I can understand why the tent embassy was established all those years ago. I think a lot has changed for the better since then. We had the historic apology just a few years ago, one of the genuine achievements of Kevin Rudd as prime minister. We had the proposal which is currently for national consideration to recognise indigenous people in the Constitution. I think the indigenous people of Australia can be very proud of the respect in which they are held by every Australian and, yes, I think a lot has changed since then and I think it probably is time to move on from that.

Later that day, Abbott attended an awards ceremony with Australian Prime Minister Julia Gillard at the Lobby Restaurant in Canberra. Gillard and Abbott were presenting emergency services medals.

== Protest ==
Near to the Lobby Restaurant, The Aboriginal Tent Embassy was holding a celebration of its 40th anniversary. Barbara Shaw was one of the organisers present. Kim Sattler, an Aboriginal and secretary of Unions ACT, was also at the celebration. Tony Hodges of Gillard's office had a conversation with Kim Sattler about Abbott's comments and also informed her that Abbott was nearby. Hodges and Sattler also exchanged text messages. Sattler then relayed to Shaw that Abbott "made a statement to the press that the Tent Embassy should be pulled down". Shaw relayed the comments to the participants at the tent embassy and encouraged them to confront Abbott and Gillard at The Lobby Restaurant.

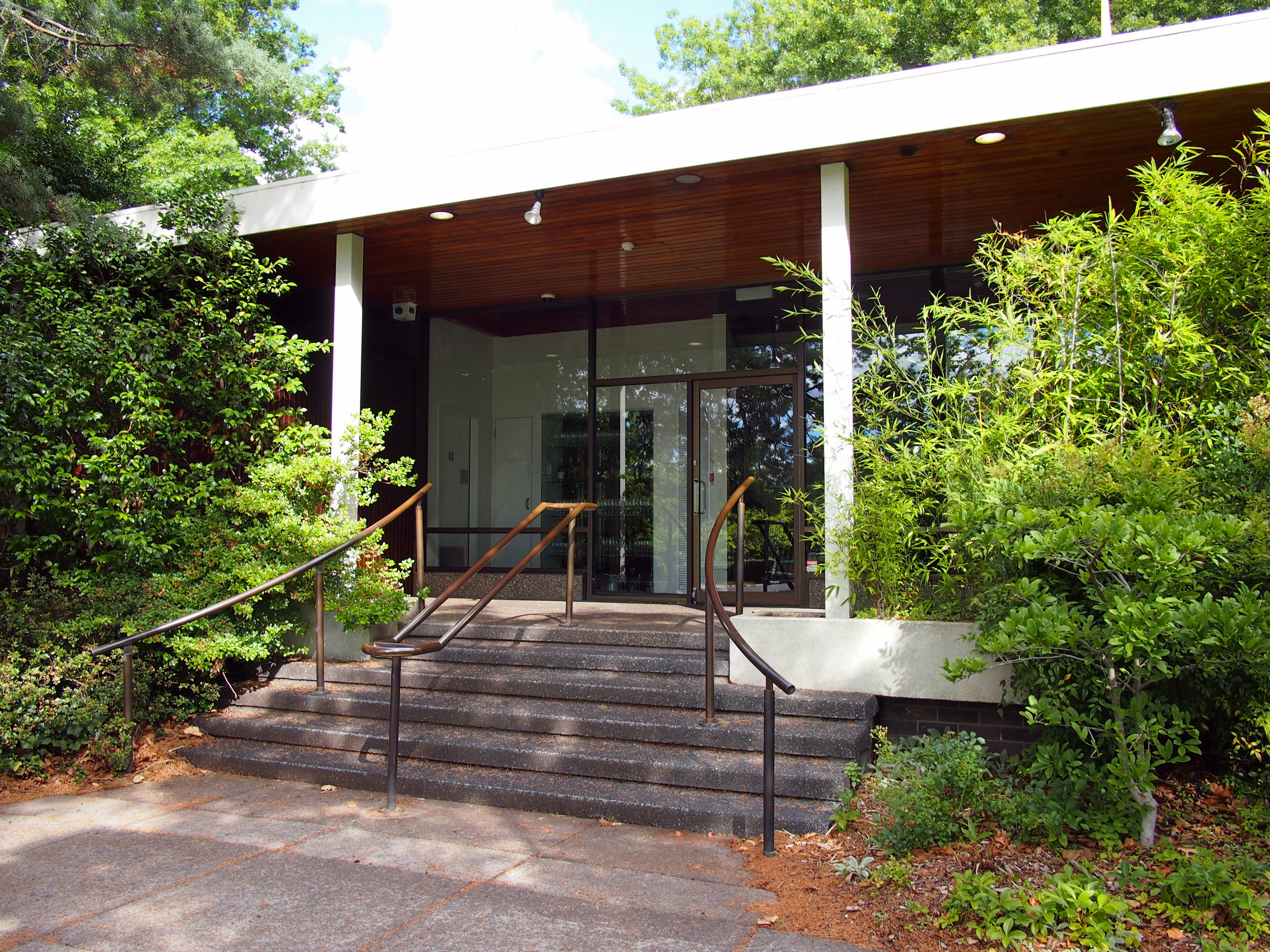
The doorway and steps the Prime Minister's security detail used to rush Gillard and Abbott out of the Lobby Restaurant

A group of protesters surrounded the Lobby Restaurant, banging on windows, and chanting. This prompted the Prime Minister's security guards (with large numbers of Federal Police assisting) to evacuate the Prime Minister and (on her request) the Opposition Leader from the venue. The Prime Minister lost her shoe during the chaotic evacuation, which was eventually returned by the protesters.

According to the Prime Minister's office, that afternoon Hodges revealed to his superiors, senior press secretary Sean Kelly and communications director John McTeirnan, that he had phoned Sattler, informing her of Abbott's comments and his whereabouts. Gillard said that she was informed of Hodges involvement in the afternoon. Hodges resigned.

After the event, the protesters claimed that the protest had been peaceful, except for intimidation by the police.

The next day, an Australian flag was burned by young Aboriginal protesters.

=== Controversy over comment allegations ===
The event received international news coverage. Some days later the federal Opposition asked the Australian Federal Police (AFP) to investigate whether there had been any criminal incitement to riot, but the AFP initially found no evidence of a criminal act. Video footage of Sattler asking Shaw to direct the protest emerged and the AFP then did investigate Sattler and Hodges. According to the ABC's 7.30 programme, in the early aftermath of the protest, Sattler reportedly claimed to have had no part in the protest. Later she said she only repeated what Hodges had told her. Following a call from the Prime Minister's office, Sattler told the media on 13 February that she did not tell protesters that Abbott wanted to "tear down" the embassy. The following evening, the ABC 7.30 programme aired footage of Sattler telling Shaw at the protest: "Abbott's just made a statement to the press that the Tent Embassy should be pulled down. He's over there". Abbott had not made the comment.

Unions ACT voted to maintain full support of Sattler despite her involvement. The AFP inquiry found that Hodges' decision to contact Sattler was in accordance with his duties as a media advisor, and the information he provided was accurate and already in the public domain. However, Sattler "mistranslated" the information Hodges had provided during her conversation with Shaw by stating that Abbott had expressed a desire to "pull down" the embassy. The AFP concluded that a "lack of foresight" by Hodges, Sattler and others and the misscommunication of Abbott's comments had contributed to the protests, but there was no evidence of any criminal conduct.

At a Senate Inquiry, Australian Federal Police commissioner Tony Negus testified that the Embassy had been considered in security planning but there was no warning of any risk.
