= Jonathan Wilhelmsson =

Swedish director and filmmaker

- Born: Jonathan Persson; 31 October 1991 (age 34); Mockfjärd, Sweden
- Occupation: Filmmaker
- Years active: 2007–present
- Known for: Waltzing Tilda; Untitled Earth Sim 64

Jonathan Wilhelmsson (born October 31, 1991) is a Swedish director and filmmaker. He is best known for his low-budget short films Waltzing Tilda and Untitled Earth Sim 64.

Wilhelmsson was born in Mockfjärd, Sweden where he started making films with his father's home video camera. He later studied at Sydney Film School in Australia.

== Select filmography ==
- Naomi and the Heartbreakers (2013)
- A Squeal in the Hamsterwheel (2016)
- Waltzing Tilda (2017)
- Alone in New York (2018)
- Mighty Jobs (TV Series documentary, 2018-2020)
- Untitled Earth Sim 64 (2021)
