= Sydney Film School =

Location
- 242 Young Street, Waterloo; Sydney; Australia
- Coordinates: 33.901055°S 151.207885°E

Information
- School type: Film school, selective
- Established: 2004
- Age range: 18+
- Website: www.sydneyfilmschool.edu.au

Sydney Film School is a private film school based in Waterloo, a suburb in Sydney, Australia. It was created to provide practical-based filmmaking training to students.

Sydney Film School is located at Waterloo Studios, a working professional production studio. The Studios house a Soundstage, Production Offices, Post-Production Edit & Audio Suites, and Rehearsal Studios.

Waterloo Studios won the Tertiary Category of the 2014 Master Builders Association Excellence in Construction Award.

Sydney Film School shares the facilities with Sydney Actors School, a practical-based stage and screen acting school. Film and acting students build relationships and collaborate through the duration of their studies. The studios also partner with international film and acting companies and programs, with many using Waterloo Studios’ facilities for their own shoots and productions.

== History ==
Sydney Film School was established in August 2004 by a group of founding partners including Mark Allen, John Buckmaster, Ben Ferris, Phillip Handy, Leslie Oliver, Uracha Oliver, John Saunders, Joe Skrzynski, Emile Sherman and Willie Weinstein. Amanda King and Fabio Cavadini were founding faculty members, and taught documentary filmmaking from 2004 until at least 2015.

The school was officially launched on 3 February 2005 by the Premier of the State of NSW and Minister for the Arts, Bob Carr. The Founding Director was Ben Ferris (2004–18).

The school's campus was located for many years at 82 Cope Street, Waterloo, before moving to a new building called Production House, Waterloo Studios.

As of February 2012, 78 films produced by Sydney Film School had screened at 106 international film festivals worldwide, with 34 first place wins

In 2019 Sydney Film School changed ownership as part of an amalgamation with Sydney Acting School (formerly known as International Screen Academy) at Waterloo Studios. This amalgamation took place after the school had moved into the Academy's Young Street campus from its Cope Street campus. Although the Sydney Film School name, brand and course structure live on, the original founders and staff are no longer involved with the current school.

Waterloo Studios, a purpose-built film and TV studio in Sydney, Australia, that is home to Sydney Film School, and Sydney Actors School.

== Courses and admission ==
Sydney Film School offers a one-year Diploma of Screen & Media, and one year Advanced Diploma of Screen & Media.

Students are selected through an interview and pitch presentation process. Prospective students apply at the Sydney Film School website, and then prepare a film/TV pitch to present to the interview panel.

== Accolades ==
In April 2020, Variety magazine included Sydney Film School in their list of "The Top Film Schools and Educators From Around the Globe".

Some of the accolades afforded to Sydney Film School graduates for their work include:

- Best Student Documentary Film at Antenna Film Festival: "Ol' Blue Eyes", Matt Cooney
- Finalist at Bondi Short Film Festival: "Letters Home", Neilesh Verma
- Industry Advisory Board (IAB) Pitch Competition winner: "Lotus Sonny", Gary Sofarelli
- Opening Night screening; Best Australian Animation & Best Australian Composer at World of Women WOW Film Festival, 2012: "Camera Obscura", Marta Maia
- Best Comedy Feature & Best Supporting Actress at the American Independent Filmmaker Showcase: "Sick", Nick Danger
- Best Direction in a Student Film at 2012 Australian Directors Guild Awards: "The Room", Epiphany Morgan
- Best Drama at Blue Mountain Film Festival and Audience Award at Sandfly Film Festival: "The Good Neighbour", James Crisp
- Best Drama Short at Stockholm Independent Film Festival, The Newcomer Award at Video Junkee 2017, Bronze Award for Best Film at Novemberfestivalen 2017 and Best Nordic Film at The Nordic Youth Film Festival 2018: "Waltzing Tilda", Jonathan Wilhelmsson.

== Sydney Film School Festival ==
At the end of each semester, the school organises the Sydney Film School Festival to display the students' work. Previous guest keynote speakers at the Sydney Film School Festival awards ceremony have included: George Miller (July 2005), Tom Zubrycki (July 2006), Phillip Noyce (December 2006), Paul Keating – Former Prime Minister of Australia (July 2007), Gillian Armstrong (December 2007), Bob Connolly (July 2008), Phillip Hearnshaw (December 2008), Bruce Beresford (December 2009), Ray Lawrence (July 2010), Virginia Judge (December 2010), Gretel Killeen (July 2011), Wayne Blair (July 2012), John Duigan (December 2012) and David Jowsey (July 2013).
