= Bobbi Sykes =

Australian poet and author

- Born: Roberta Sykes; 16 August 1943; Townsville, Australia
- Died: 14 November 2010 (aged 67); Sydney, Australia
- Education: Harvard Graduate School of Education
- Occupation: Poet
- Writing career
- Genre: Poetry

Roberta "Bobbi" Sykes (16 August 1943 – 14 November 2010) was an Australian poet and author. She was a lifelong campaigner for Indigenous land rights, as well as human rights and women's rights.

== Early life and education ==
Born Roberta Barkley Patterson in Townsville, Queensland, sometime in the 1940s, Sykes was raised by her white mother, Rachel Patterson, and never knew her father. Sykes says in her autobiography that his identity is unknown, and her mother told her a number of different accounts about him; variously that he was Fijian, Papuan, African American, and Native American. The most consistent and plausible version was that he was an African American soldier stationed in Australia during World War II.

Although she fought hard for Australian Aboriginal rights, she herself was not of Australian Aboriginal descent. She was sometimes criticised for not correcting the record when others assumed she was Aboriginal.

== Early activism ==
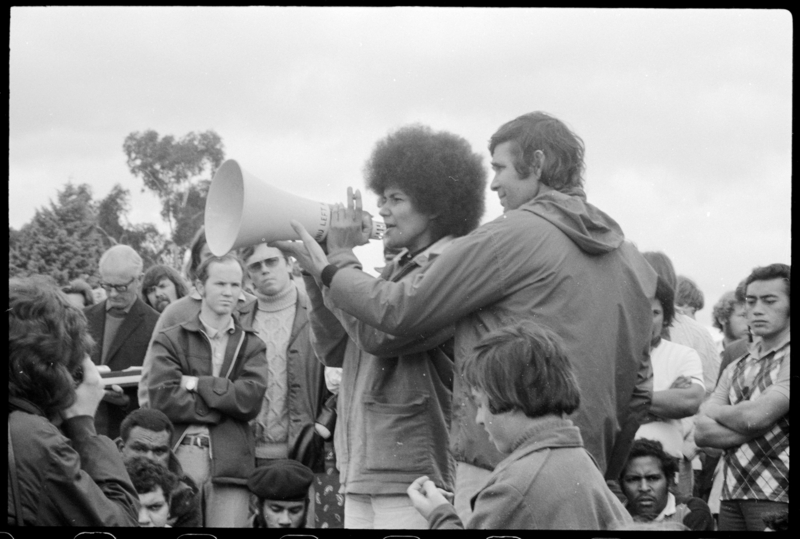
Sykes with Gordon Briscoe at the Aboriginal Tent Embassy, Canberra, 30 July 1972

Sykes was expelled from St Patricks College at age 14 and, after a succession of jobs, including a nurse's assistant at the Townsville General Hospital from 1959 to 1960, she moved to Brisbane and then to Sydney in the early to mid-1960s, where she worked as a striptease dancer at the notorious Pink Pussycat Club in Kings Cross under the stage name of "Opal Stone".

She became a freelance journalist and got involved in several national Indigenous activist organisations. She was one of the many protestors arrested at the Aboriginal Tent Embassy in July 1972.

During the 1970s Sykes, along with Sue Chilly (also spelt Chilli), (Note: Iris Susanne (or Suzanne) Colleen Chilly was born in 1954 at Nambour, Queensland, and was described by ASIO as "a staunch member of the Aboriginal rights movement, progressing reform both as an activist of groups such as the Australian Black Panthers, and as a field officer of the Department of Aboriginal and Island Affairs". She was a colleague of Cheryl Buchanan at the Aboriginal Publications Foundation.) Marcia Langton, and Naomi Mayers, formed the Black Women's Action (BWA) group, which later evolved into the Roberta Sykes Foundation.

She was involved in the creation and early development of the Redfern Aboriginal Medical Service, the National Black Theatre in Redfern, and in the setting up of Aboriginal Islander Dance Theatre in Glebe, which later became NAISDA, which nurtured Bangarra Dance Theatre.

== Poetry ==
Sykes's early poetry was published in 1979 in the book Love Poems and Other Revolutionary Actions. The first edition was limited to a thousand copies (with the first 300 numbered and signed). A mass-market edition was published in 1988. Her second volume of poetry was published in 1996. In 1981 she ghosted the autobiography of Mum (Shirl) Smith, an Aboriginal Australian social worker in New South Wales.

She won the Patricia Weickert Black Writers Award in 1981.

== Harvard and later activism ==
Sykes received a PhD in education from Harvard University in 1983 or 1984, after Black Women's Action raised funds to cover her expenses to study there in 1979. She was the first black Australian to graduate from a United States university.

She returned to Australia, where she took over running the BWA.

She was appointed to the Nation Review, as Australia's first (presumed) Indigenous columnist.

== Recognition ==
In 1994 her role was recognised when awarded the Australian Human Rights Medal.

Sykes's three-volume autobiography Snake Dreaming was published between 1997 and 2000. The first volume won The Age Book of the Year 1997 and the 1998 Nita Kibble Literary Award for women writers.

== Death and legacy ==
Sykes died in Sydney in November 2010.

== Roberta Sykes Foundation ==
During the 1970s Sykes, along with Sue Chilly (often spelt Chilli; from Brisbane), Marcia Langton, and Naomi Mayers, formed the Black Women's Action (BWA) group, which later evolved into the Roberta Sykes Foundation. BWA started publishing a monthly community newspaper for Aboriginal people, Koori Bina, also spelt Koori-Bina (meaning "black ears"; also translated as "listen up"). Aboriginal journalist John Newfong, already established in mainstream media and inaugural editor and principal writer of quarterly magazine Identity (1971–1982) was also involved. The paper raised awareness of biased coverage of Indigenous issues in mainstream Australian media, and covered Aboriginal unemployment, health issues, and land rights, but struggled on minimal funding, relying on donations to keep going. It was later described as a "hard-hitting, staunchly political newspaper". It criticised cuts to funding that affected Aboriginal organisations and the Fraser government's plans to dismantle Medibank. Along with other Indigenous publications, it covered stories in detail that were not found, or only superficially covered, in mainstream media, such as Aboriginal housing.

Students at Aboriginal Islander Dance Theatre were taught publishing and writing skills to produce the newspaper, which eventually led to their assuming responsibility for its publication. The cast of Here Comes the Nigger by Gerry Bostock, which played at Black Theatre in Redfern in December 1976, were involved in the publication and group. The journal ran from June 1976 to June 1979, before running out of funds. A new magazine, AIM (Aboriginal and Islander Message or Aboriginal-Islander-Message), took up its format and ran until 1982. It was more moderate in tone than its predecessor, but did publish political stories challenging government policy, such as the powers given to ASIO over Aboriginal campaigners. It also encouraged Indigenous participation and activism. AIM was produced by a group of Aboriginal students, overseen by two mainstream journalists

Langton later wrote that the founders of the paper had been inspired by Abo Call, published in 1938 in Sydney, by Jack Patten (co-founder of the Aborigines Progressive Association) and Percy Reginald Stephensen. She also wrote: "the experience of producing those newspapers within a hostile white environment... because it has the power and resources, has historically defined us".

BWA expanded its scope over time, and started funding small enterprises established by Aboriginal women. In 1979 it raised funds to pay for Sykes to study at Harvard University, where she became the first Aboriginal woman to graduate from an American university. It contributed to several other Black women's educational goals, including Norma Ingram and MaryAnn Bin-Sallik, who both attended Harvard too. BWA played a crucial part in raising public awareness and funds to enable Mum Shirl to pay off the mortgage on her house she was in danger of losing, after giving so much to others throughout her life.

In 1990, Black Women's Action became registered as a tax-deductible entity, changing its name to Black Women's Action in Education Foundation (BWAEF) to reflect the change. Langton, Rob Bryant (later co-founder of Bangarra), Jackie Huggins, Jilpia Jones, Brian Syron and Lili Tuwai became trustees of the foundation. Funds to assist Aboriginal students to achieve goals were raised mainly through small individual donations and community fundraising events.

In 2003 Sykes became ill and participated less in BWAEF activities, but the foundation continued its work until around 2006, when there was an hiatus for a few years.

In late 2008, Sykes asked Danny Gilbert to revive the foundation, and Gilbert suggested a change of name to the Roberta Sykes Indigenous Education Foundation (RSIEF). In 2010, Peter Waters (chair), Jilpia Jones, Shireen Malamoo, Mark McMillan, Richard Potok and Nicole Watson were appointed as trustees, with Potok also taking the role of executive director. RSIEF has continues Sykes' work, supporting a number of Aboriginal and Torres Strait Islander students to undertaking postgraduate study overseas. It also runs a program of bursaries to support short course overseas study.

== Awards and nominations ==
- 1981: Patricia Weickert Black Writers Award
- 1994: Australian Human Rights Medal
- 1997: Age Book of the Year for Snake Cradle
- 1998: National Biography Award for Snake Cradle
- 1998: Nita B. Kibble Literary Award for Snake Cradle

== Bibliography ==
- Love Poems and other Revolutionary Actions (Cammeray: The Saturday Centre, 1979)
- Mum Shirl: An Autobiography (with Colleen Shirley Perry) (Melbourne, 1981)
- Love Poems and other Revolutionary Actions (St. Lucia: University of Queensland Press, 1989) ISBN 0-7022-2173-2
- Eclipse (Queensland, Australia: Univ of Queensland Press, 1996) ISBN 0-7022-2848-6
- Incentive, Achievement and Community (Sydney: Sydney University Press, 1986)
- Black Majority (Hawthorn, Australia: Hudson, 1989) ISBN 0-949873-25-X
- Murawina: Australian Women of High Achievement (Sydney: Doubleday, 1993) ISBN 0-86824-436-8
- Snake Cradle (Sydney: Allen & Unwin, 1997) ISBN 1-86448-513-2
- Snake Dancing (Sydney: Allen & Unwin, 1998) ISBN 1-86448-513-2
- Snake Circle (Sydney: Allen & Unwin, 2000) ISBN 1-86508-335-6
