= Adam Shoemaker =

Canadian-Australian academic (born 1957)

Adam Maximilian Shoemaker (born 1957) is a Canadian-Australian academic and higher education administrator, and a scholarly authority within the field of Indigenous Australian literature. He currently serves as vice-chancellor of Victoria University.

== Education ==
Shoemaker was born in Canada, and holds a BA Honours degree from Queen's University in Ontario, Canada (1979), and a PhD from the Australian National University in Canberra, Australia (1986).

== Professional career ==
Shoemaker has held several positions in higher education administration in Australia, including at Griffith University, Monash University, the Australian National University and in 2016 he was appointed Vice-Chancellor of Southern Cross University. In late-2020, he commenced as vice-chancellor and president of Victoria University.

== Honours and awards ==
Shoemaker is a Commonwealth Scholar. He also has received a number of literary awards, including being highly commended for the Human Rights Awards, and winner of the Walter McRae Russell Award.

== Select publications ==
- Shoemaker, A.M. 1993. Mudrooroo: A Critical Study. Pymble: Angus and Robertson.
- Shoemaker, A.M. (ed.) 1998. A Sea Change: Australian Writing and Photography. Sydney: Sydney Organising Committee for the Olympic Games.
- Shoemaker, A.M. 2004. Black Words, White Page: Aboriginal Literature 1929-1988. Canberra: ANU Press.
- Muecke, S. and Shoemaker, A.M. 2002. Les Aborigènes d'Australie, collection « Découvertes Gallimard » (nº 428), série Culture et société. Paris: Éditions Gallimard.
- Muecke, S. and Shoemaker, A.M. 2004. Aboriginal Australians: First Nations of an Ancient Continent, 'New Horizons' series. London: Thames and Hudson.
