= Ben Ferris =

Australian filmmaker

Ben Ferris is an Australian filmmaker. He was a co-founder of the Sydney Film School, of which he was the Director from 2004 to 2018. In 2020 he co-founded Breathless Films, an AACTA-winning production company that has produced the Australian feature films "Birdeater" (2023), "Tennessine" (2023), "Love Road" (2023), "The Longest Weekend" (2022), and "Lonesome" (2022).

== Notable Achievements ==
As a film writer/director he has won major international awards, including the Grand Prix at the Akira Kurosawa Memorial Short Film Festival in Tokyo, Japan for his short film "The Kitchen" (2003) and the Grand Prix at the One Take Film Festival in Zagreb, Croatia for his short film "Ascension" (2004). He has written and directed the feature film "Penelope" (2009) (with an original score by renowned music composer Max Richter) which screened in National Competition at the 56th Pula Film Festival and the critically acclaimed feature hybrid drama-documentary film "57 Lawson" (2016). In 2017 he won a residency at the prestigious Cité internationale des arts in Paris. In 2018 he was shortlisted for the Eurimages Project Lab Award at the 53rd Karlovy Vary Film Festival for his feature film "In(di)visible". In 2022 he was nominated for an AACTA in his role as producer of the feature film "Lonesome".
