= Waltzing Tilda =

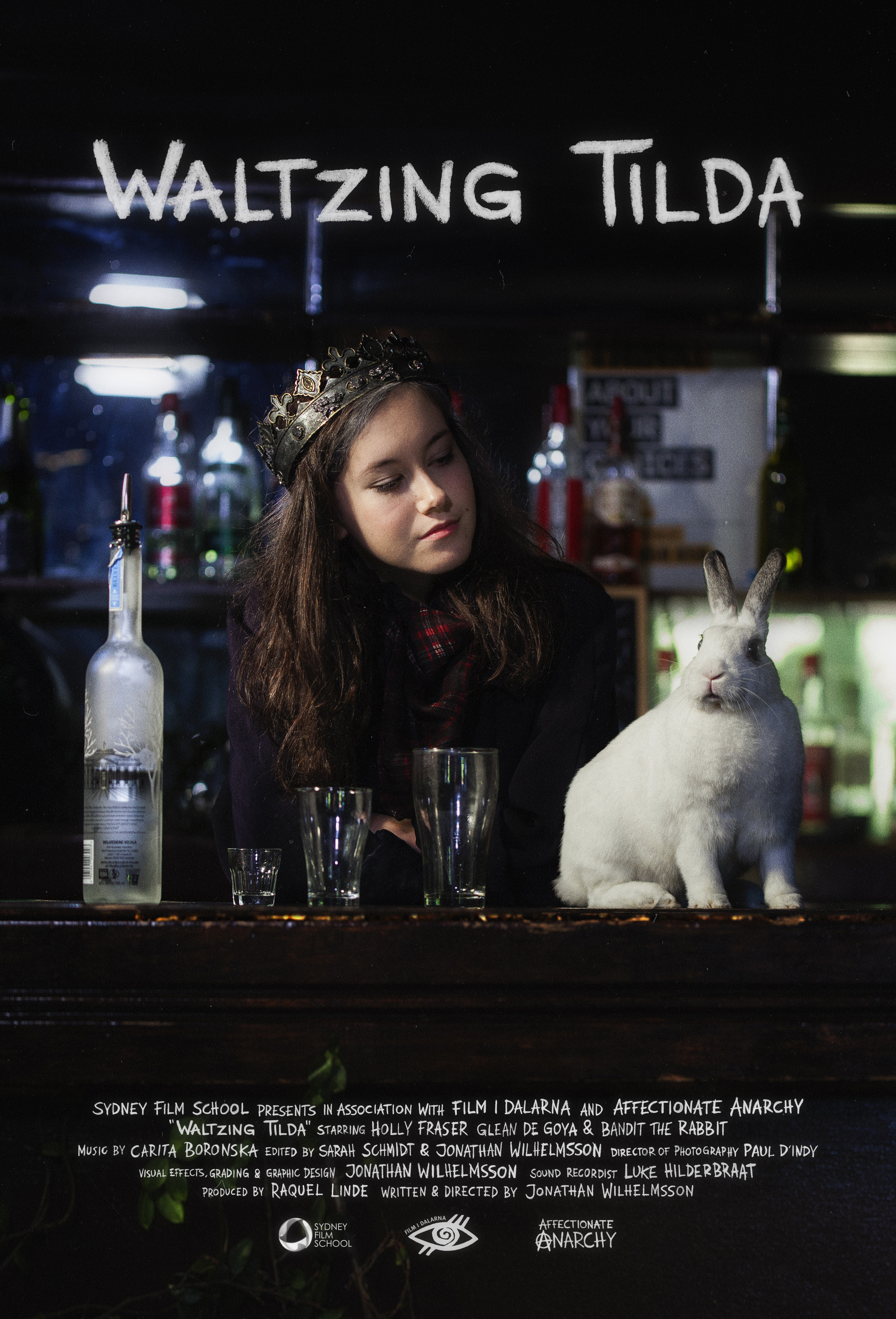
- Theatrical release poster
- Directed by: Jonathan Wilhelmsson
- Written by: Jonathan Wilhelmsson
- Produced by: Raquel Linde
- Starring: Holly Fraser; Glean De Goya; Bandit the Rabbit
- Cinematography: Paul d'Indy
- Edited by: Sarah Schmidt & Jonathan Wilhelmsson
- Music by: Carita Boronska
- Production companies: Sydney Film School; Film i Dalarna; Affectionate Anarchy
- Release date: 20 January 2017 (Australia)
- Running time: 15 minutes
- Countries: Australia; Sweden
- Language: English
- Budget: 5650 AUD

Waltzing Tilda is a 2017 post-apocalyptic comedy-drama short film written and directed by Jonathan Wilhelmsson. The story is about Tilda, a lone wolf disillusioned with society who one day finds herself the last human on earth. The film was produced in Australia at Sydney Film School.

== Plot ==
Tilda (Holly Fraser) is an aimless lone wolf in her early twenties who has grown completely disillusioned with society. One morning she wakes up to find humanity mysteriously gone, and overjoyed she rampages across the city, vandalizing the Sydney Opera House and destroying the Queen Victoria Statue, crowning herself King of the World. Two years later Tilda has gone slightly crazy in her deteriorating kingdom, her only company being a talking, foul-mouthed rabbit named Shane (voiced by Glean De Goya). Shane tries to talk sense into Tilda who is now a severe alcoholic wasting her life away, his point being that she is still a part of the world and needs to take responsibility. Tilda won’t listen, but after inadvertently causing the death of Shane she begins a journey towards maturity, admitting that she’s lived a selfish life that was only given value by the people around her. She sings "Waltzing Matilda" at a funeral for Shane before finally fading away.

== Cast ==
- Holly Fraser as Tilda
- Glean De Goya as Shane (voice)
- Bandit the Rabbit as Shane
- Indiana Kwong as Tilda's friend (voice)
- John Buckmaster as Father (voice)
