= Aboriginal Tent Embassy =

Permanent on-going protest in Australia

- Indigenous land rights in Australia; Part of History of Indigenous Australians
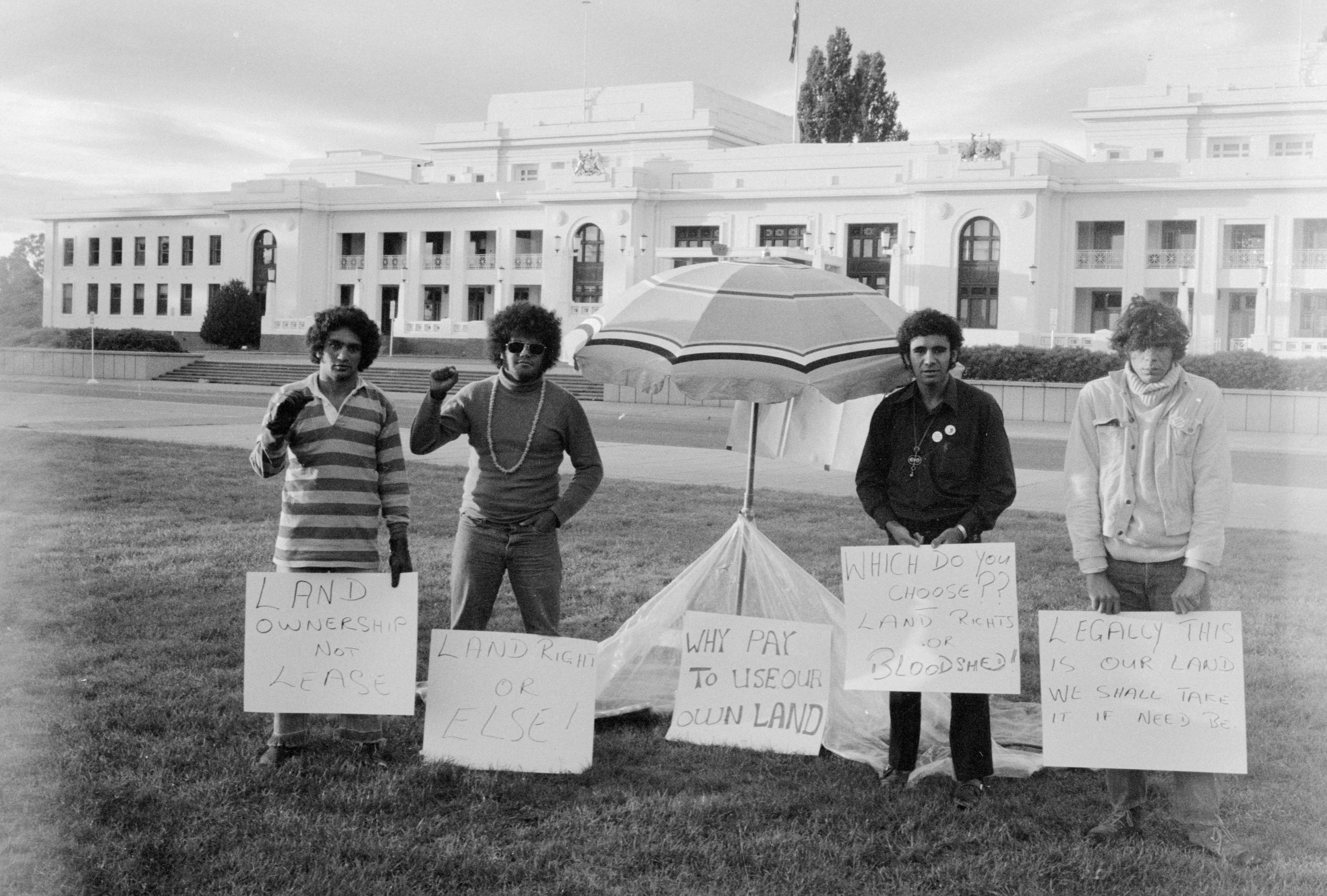
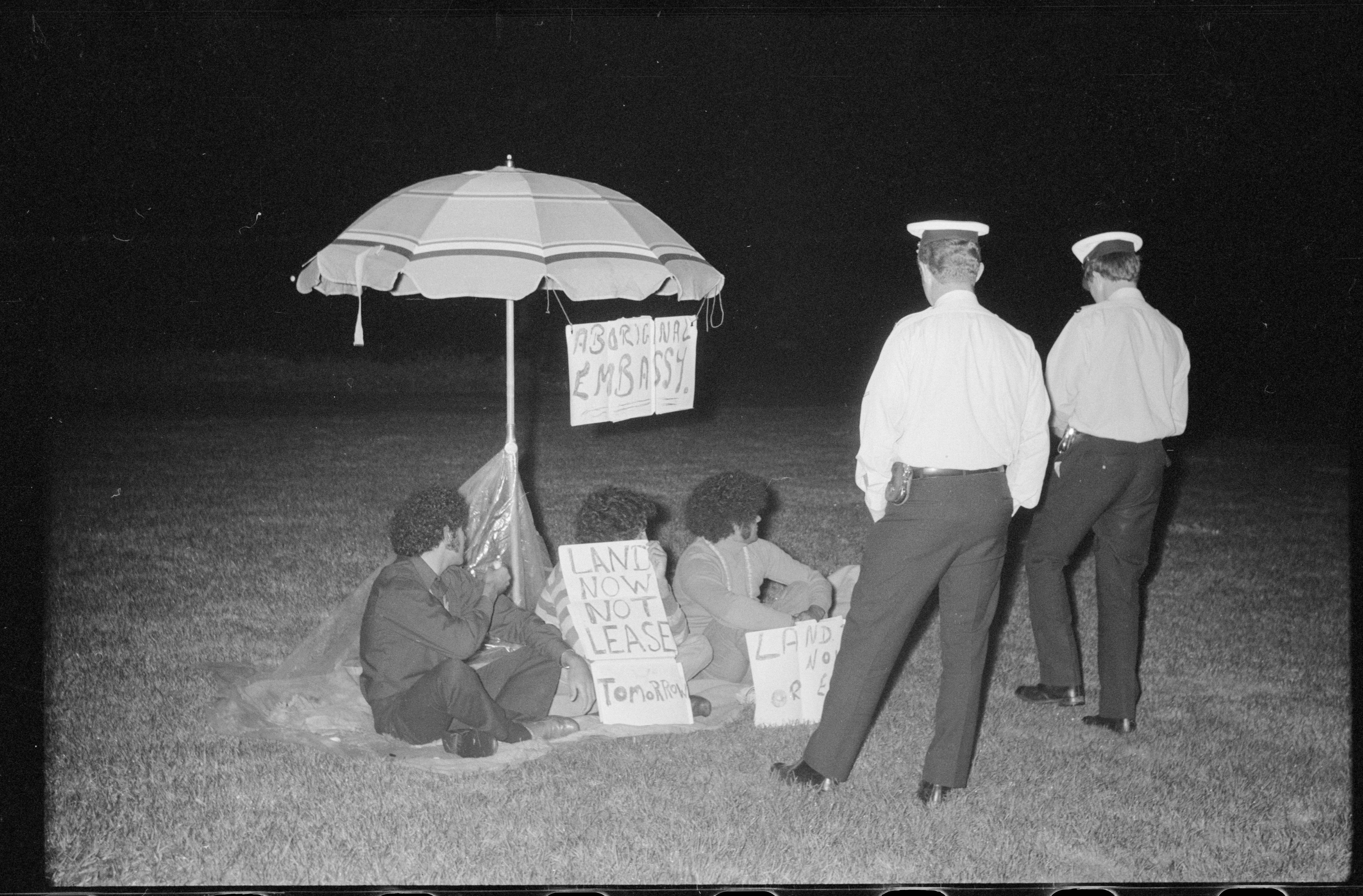
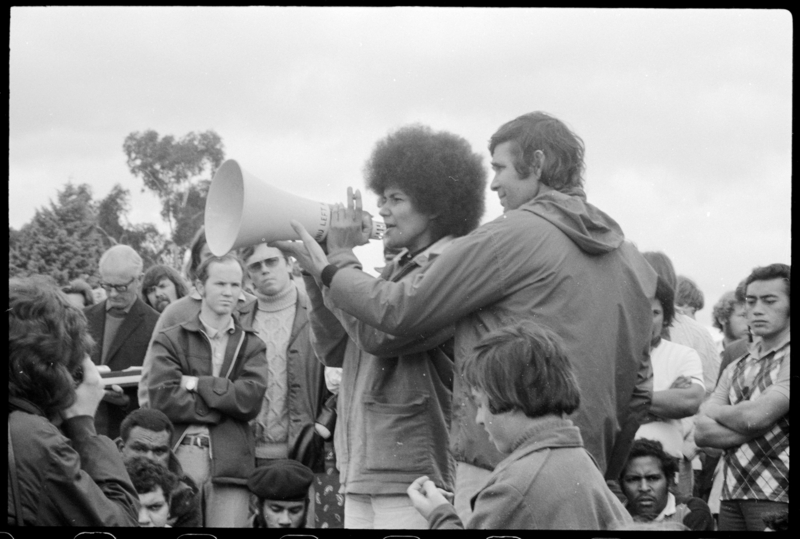
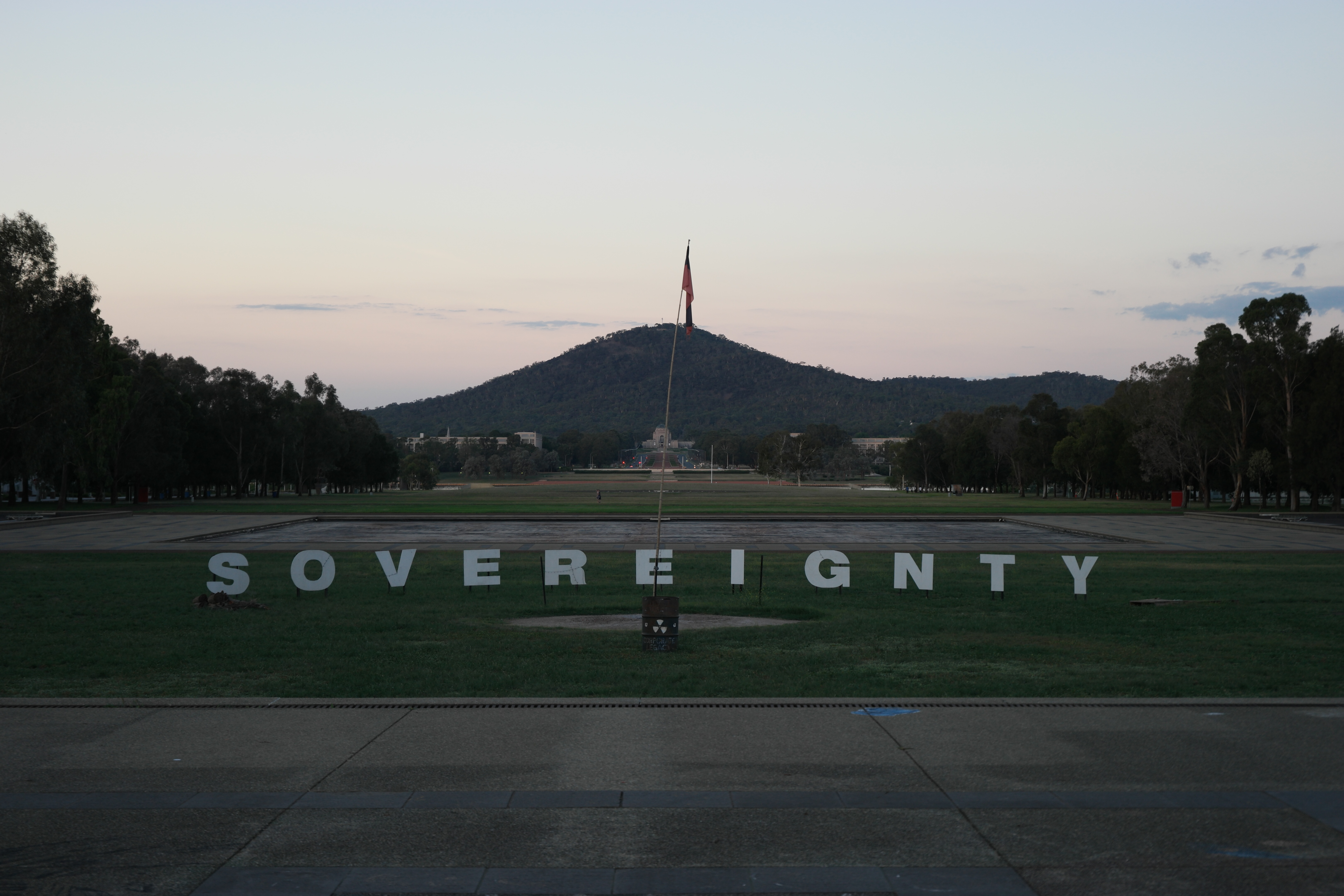
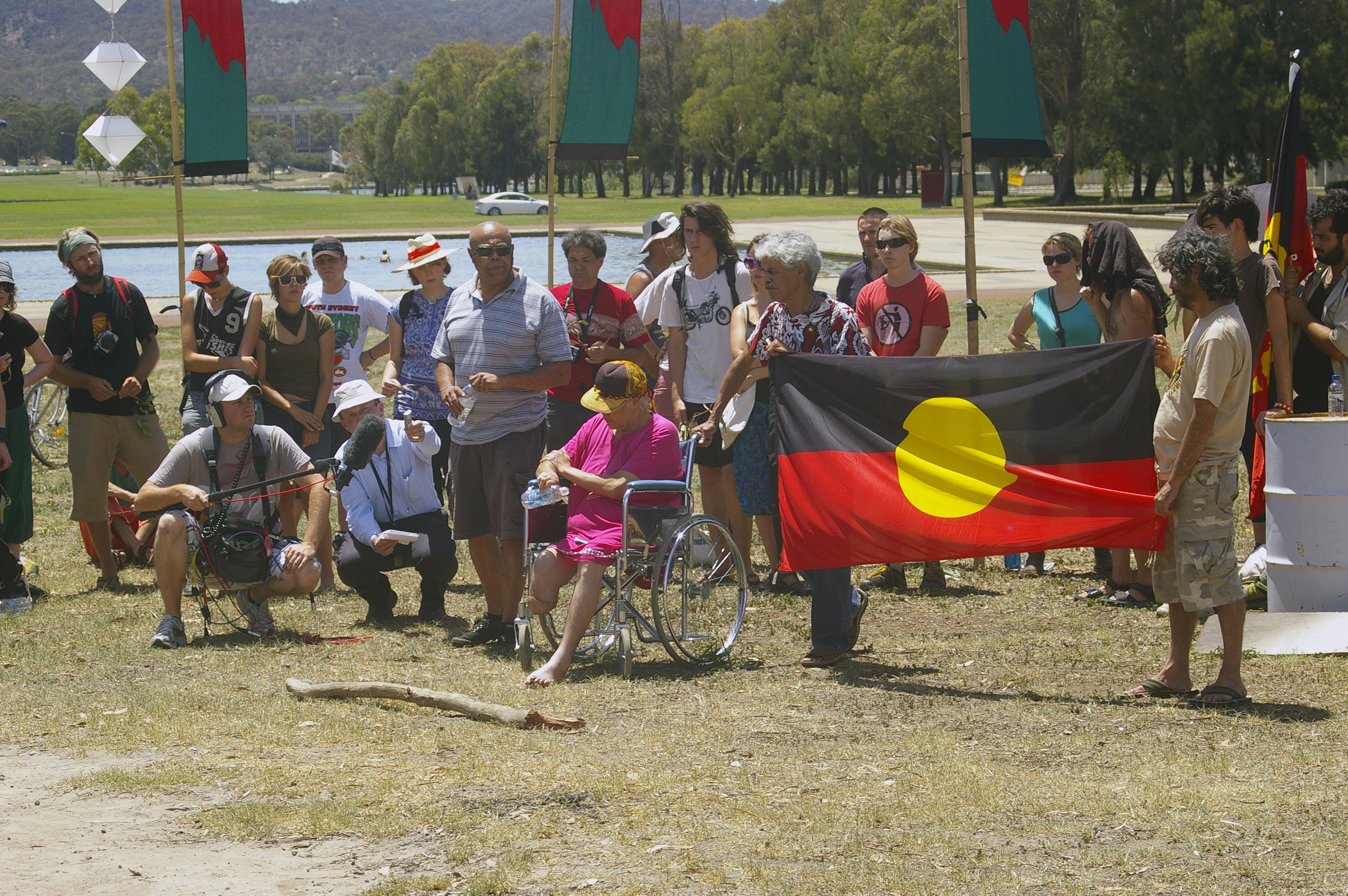
- From top: Billy Craigie, Bert Williams, Ghillar Michael Anderson and Tony Coorey, first day of the Aboriginal Tent Embassy, January 1972; Police question protesters, January 1972, Bobbi Sykes and Gordon Briscoe, July 1972; January 2015; Australia Day 2010
- Date: 26/27 January 1972
- Location: Canberra, Australia; 35°18′04″S 149°07′48″E
- Caused by: Dispossession of Indigenous Australians
- Goals: Land rights, self-determination and reassertion of Indigenous sovereignty
- Methods: Nonviolent resistance, civil disobedience, peaceful protest
- Status: Ongoing

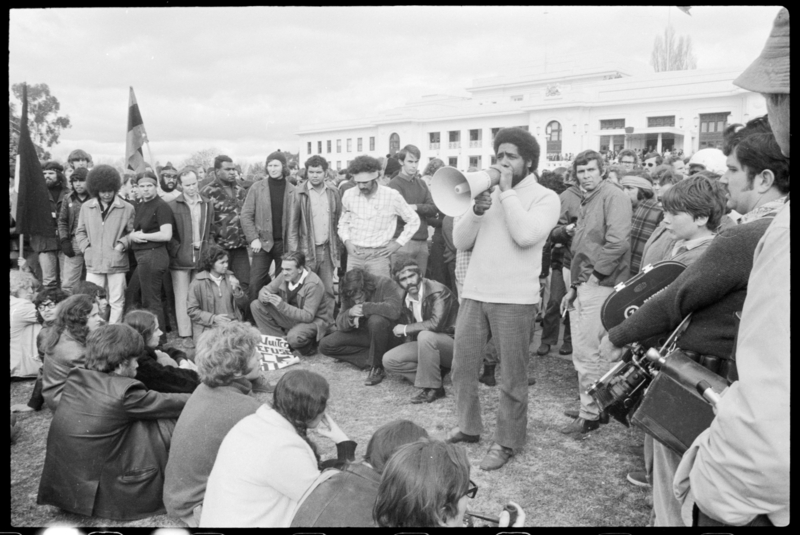
Bob Maza addresses a protest at the Embassy, 30 July 1972

The Aboriginal Tent Embassy is a permanent protest occupation site as a focus for representing the political rights of Aboriginal Australians and Torres Strait Islander people. Established on 26 January (Australia Day) 1972, it is the longest continuous protest for Indigenous land rights in the world.

First established in 1972 under a beach umbrella as a protest against the McMahon government's approach to Indigenous Australian land rights, the Aboriginal Tent Embassy is made up of signs and tents. Since 1992 it has been located on the lawn opposite Old Parliament House in Canberra, the Australian capital. It is not considered an official embassy by the Australian Government. The Embassy has been a site of protest and support for grassroots campaigns for the recognition of Indigenous land rights in Australia, Aboriginal deaths in custody, self-determination, and Indigenous sovereignty.

== Background ==
Chicka Dixon said that he had attended a political rally in 1946 where the initial idea and inspiration for the Embassy was raised by Jack Patten, President and co-founder of the Aborigines Progressive Association. Patten had called for an Aboriginal mission station to be placed in front of Parliament House, where the eyes of the world could see the plight of the land's First Peoples.

In 1967, Australians voted in an historic referendum to amend the Australian Constitution to allow the Commonwealth Government to include Aboriginal people in official population counts for constitutional purposes, and to be able to make separate laws for them; however, young urban Aboriginal people were not happy with progress since then. There had been many years of conservative governments in Australia, and during the 1960s there were also large protests against Australian involvement in the Vietnam War as well as against apartheid in South Africa. This energy was tapped into by Indigenous rights protesters.

On 26 January 1972 (Australia Day), then prime minister William McMahon issued a new policy relating to Aboriginal land use. Under this new legislation by the Coalition government, which had refused to recognise Aboriginal land rights or native title in Australia, Indigenous people would be granted leases. They offered 50-year general-purpose leases for Aboriginal people which would be conditional upon their "intention and ability to make reasonable economic and social use of land", while reserving for the Crown rights to minerals and forestry.

== 1972: establishment ==
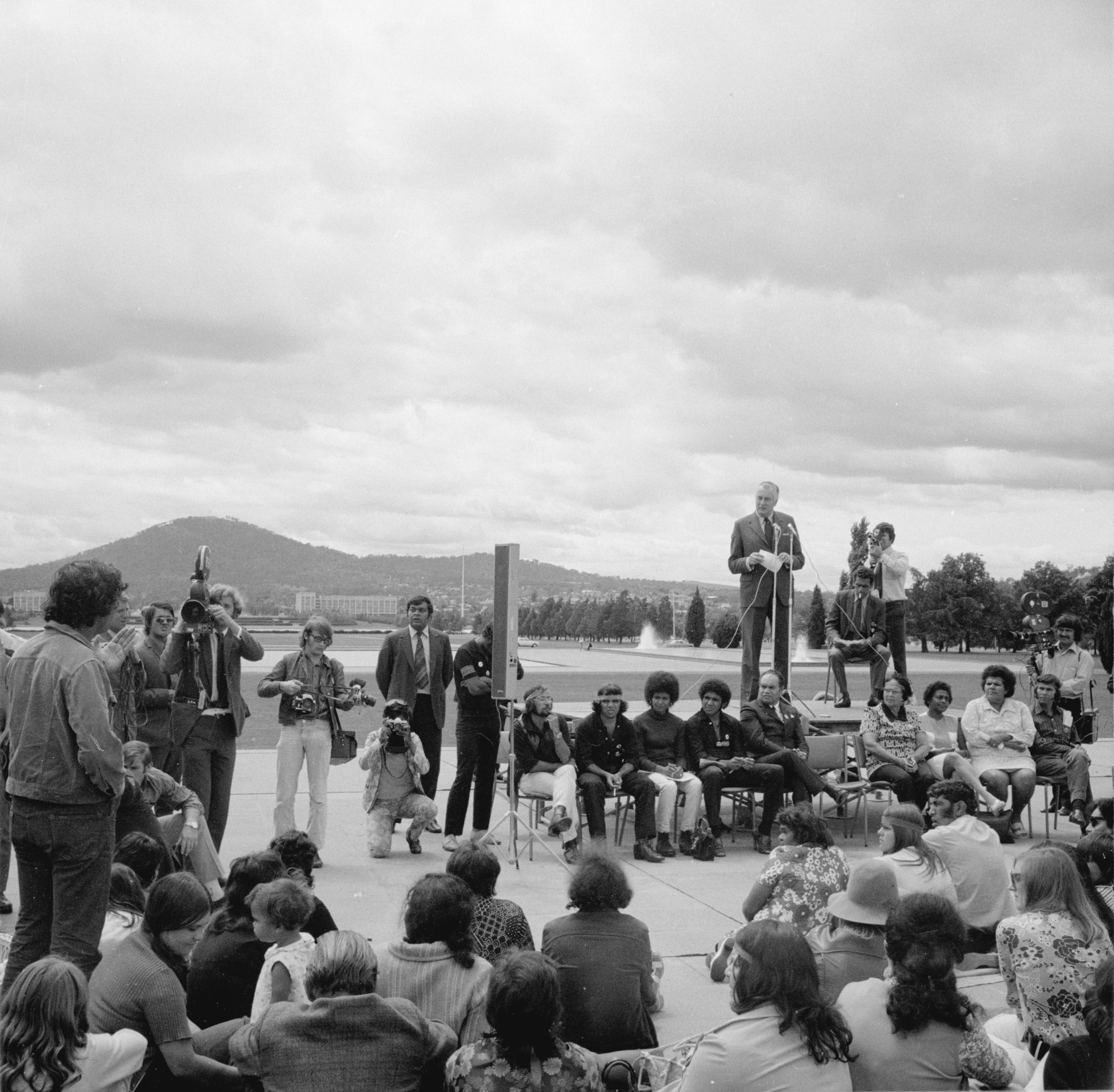
Gough Whitlam speaking at the Embassy, 8 February 1972

On 26 January 1972, four Aboriginal men, Michael Anderson, Billy Craigie, Tony Coorey and Bertie Williams (son of singer Harry Williams; later Kevin "Bert" Johnson), arrived in Canberra from Sydney, to establish an Aboriginal Embassy by planting a beach umbrella on the lawn in front of Parliament House (now Old Parliament House).

Williams suggested calling the tiny protest, at that point just a camp with a few placards, an embassy. The term "embassy" was deliberately chosen to draw attention to the fact Aboriginal people had never ceded sovereignty, and that there had never been any kind of treaty process with the Crown; they were the only cultural group in Australia who did not have an embassy to represent them. Dr Gary Foley later wrote in his 2014 book about the embassy that the term "tent embassy" was intended to serve as a reminder that Aboriginal people were living in substandard conditions, and treated "like aliens in their own land".

On 6 February 1972 the Aboriginal Tent Embassy presented a list of demands to Parliament:

- Control of the Northern Territory as a State within the Commonwealth of Australia; the parliament in the Northern Territory to be predominantly Aboriginal with native title and mining rights to all land within the Territory.
- Legal title and mining rights to all other presently existing Aboriginal reserve lands and settlements throughout Australia.
- The preservation of all sacred sites throughout Australia.
- Legal title and mining rights to areas in and around all Australian capital cities.
- Compensation money for lands not returnable to take the form of a down-payment of A$6 billion and an annual percentage of the gross national income.

Leader of the Australian Labor Party (then in opposition) Gough Whitlam spoke at the Embassy on 8 February 1972, as did Bobbi Sykes and Frank Roberts Jnr, father of theatre director Rhoda Roberts. Senator Neville Bonner, who in 1971 became the first Indigenous Australian elected to federal parliament, sympathised with the motives of the protestors, but stated they should obey eviction orders and "disagreed with the term 'embassy' because of its implication that Aboriginal people were foreigners". On a visit to the site he received "a steady stream of racial taunts from protestors during an outdoor interview" with the ABC.

The beach umbrella was soon replaced by several tents and Aboriginal people, including activists such as Gary Foley, Isabell Coe, John Newfong, Chicka Dixon, and Gordon Briscoe, and non-Indigenous supporters came from all parts of Australia to join the protest. The occupiers were told by Kep Enderby that they were legally entitled to camp outside Parliament since it was Commonwealth land. Dixon said that he became the "Minister for Defence" and they all assigned themselves portfolios. They painted the gutter "No Parking – Aboriginal Staff Only", and then introduced the (Aboriginal) flag. Support grew around the world too.

In May 1972, with winter approaching, embassy spokesman Sammy Watson Jnr announced that it would be cutting down its staff to four people over winter. A new accounting system would be introduced, with their bookkeeping open to inspection. Any donations superfluous to the needs of running the embassy would be given to community projects. Watson and Gary Foley said that the aim of the embassy was "to develop awareness among urban Blacks, in particular, of Black nationalism, and to unite all Aborigines despite cultural or language difficulties in the fight for their rights". They also expressed solidarity with other oppressed groups, and class struggles. Michael Anderson resigned as High Commissioner for the embassy at this time as he wished to turn his attention to a voter registration among Aboriginal people in rural New South Wales.

The demands were rejected, and following an amendment to the Trespass on Commonwealth Lands Ordinance 1932 (which made the occupation a squat which could then be evicted), police moved in without notice on 20 July 1972. They removed the tents and arrested eight people. Three days later, on 23 July, 200 activists returned to the site and were prevented from reoccupying it by 200 police, who dismantled the embassy. Chicka Dixon commented "we decided to fight the coppers, so we armed ourselves with little sticks". The police did not intervene, and after listening to speeches the crowd dispersed peacefully. The clash was later described by Anderson as "a bloody battle", which caused 36 police to be taken to hospital and 18 protesters to be sent to jail. A week later on 30 July, around 2000 people turned up, and the tents were re-erected afterwards removed by the protesters, in a peaceful demonstration.

During the first six months of its life in 1972 the Embassy succeeded in uniting Aboriginal people throughout Australia in demanding uniform national land rights, and mobilised widespread non-Indigenous support for the cause. Humour was used to engage ordinary Australians. Other people associated with the Embassy demonstration in 1972 include Gary Williams, Sam Watson (aka Sammy Watson Jnr), Pearl Gibbs, Roberta Sykes, Alana Doolan, Cheryl Buchanan (later partner of poet and activist Lionel Fogarty, and mother of six children), Pat Eatock, Kevin Gilbert, Denis Walker, and Shirley Smith ("Mum Shirl").

Many of the main participants in the Embassy, including John Newfong, Cheryl Buchanan, Gary Foley and Michael Anderson, also produced Indigenous newspapers, which published alternative information from that found in mainstream newspapers. The Embassy also began to attract attention in the international press such as The New York Times and BBC News, and comparisons were made with apartheid in South Africa. Some of the protesters in the Aboriginal rights movement had been involved in the Black theatre, and performed street theatre as well as being heard on the stage.

The ACT Supreme Court ruled in September 1972 that the amendment to the Trespass on Commonwealth Lands Ordinance 1932 did not allow for the eviction of the Embassy. A Bill was quickly added to make the Ordinance retrospective, and the Embassy was evicted again the next day, after it had been symbolically re-erected.

== 1970s–1990s: temporary relocation ==
In October 1973, around 70 Aboriginal protesters staged a sit-in on the steps of Parliament House and the Tent Embassy was re-established. The sit-in ended when Labor Prime Minister Gough Whitlam agreed to meet with protesters.

On 30 May 1974 the embassy was destroyed in a storm, but its contents were safeguarded by the Department of the Capital Territory, and it was re-established on 30 October by the Organisation of Aboriginal Unity (OAU), who staged a sit-in in at the Department of Aboriginal Affairs and on the steps of Parliament House and temporarily renamed it the Canberra Aboriginal Reserve. They charged Whitlam with forgetting his earlier promises. On 21 November the OAU said that the "mission" would remain on the Parliament House lawns until "The Department of Aboriginal Affairs was abolished; all reserves and land on which blacks were now living were handed back to them in full ownership; compensation for land lost was paid plus a percentage of the annual gross income; an Aboriginal commission was formed to handle Aboriginal affairs and distribute all funds; all budget submissions were met and approved in time to enable all black organisations to function at the requirement of the people".

In February 1975 Aboriginal activist Charles Perkins negotiated the "temporary" removal of the Embassy with the Government, pending Government action on land rights. In December 1976 the embassy was dismantled after the passing of the Aboriginal Land Rights Act 1976 with bipartisan support by the Fraser government, having been introduced by the Whitlam government in mid-1975. The protest site was then relocated to various sites in Canberra until 1992. In March 1976, the Embassy was established in a house in the nearby suburb of Red Hill; however, this closed in 1977. For a short period in 1979, the embassy was re-established by Lyall Munro Jnr, Cecil Patten, and Paul Coe, as the "National Aboriginal Government" on Capital Hill, site of the proposed new Parliament House.

On the 20th anniversary of its founding in 1992, the Aboriginal Tent Embassy was re-established at the original site on the lawns of Old Parliament House. Despite being a continual source of controversy, with many calls for its removal, it has existed on the site since that time.

In 1993, the ashes of the poet Kevin Gilbert, who had been involved in the early days, were buried at the site.

The site of the Tent Embassy was added to the Australian Register of the National Estate in 1995, after being registered in 1987, as the only Aboriginal site in Australia that is recognised nationally as representing political struggle for all Aboriginal and Torres Strait Islander people.

== 2000s–2010s ==
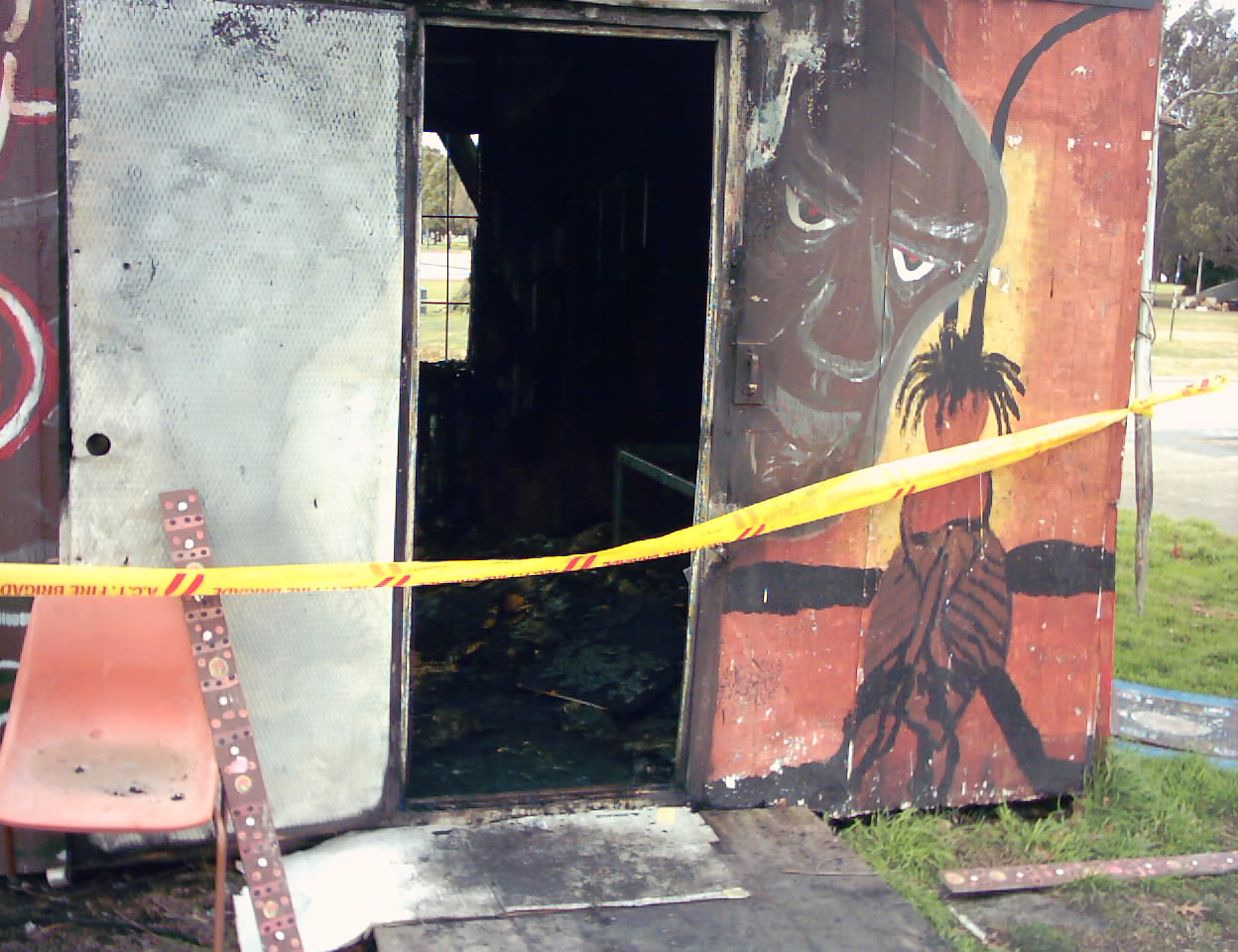
Damage to the Embassy from December 2003 arson attack

In the leadup to the 2000 Sydney Olympics, Isabell Coe from the Wiradjuri Nation set up a Peace Camp and combined ashes from Canberra's sacred fire to the fire at Victoria Park in Camperdown, New South Wales to promote reconciliation. This sacred fire was originally made by Kevin Buzzacott and lit by Wiradjuri man Paul Coe at the embassy in 1998.

The 30th anniversary was celebrated in January 2002, when a group of Aboriginal elders, including Uncle Kevin Buzzacott, reclaimed the sacred totems of the kangaroo and emu (which come with cultural obligations) from the Australian Coat of Arms, which was put on public display in front of the ceremonial fire. Police were called, and Buzzacott was charged with "dishonestly appropriating a bronze coat of arms with the intention of permanently depriving the Commonwealth of its property". Buzzacott also made an unsuccessful attempt to charge the Australian Government with genocide, but this was turned down by the Attorney-General.

There have been a number of suspicious fires at the site. The most devastating fire took place in June 2003, when 31 years of records were lost. Police again attempted to remove protesters from the site after this.

Some elders of the local Ngunnawal people called for the eviction of the Tent Embassy in 2005, viewing it as an eyesore.

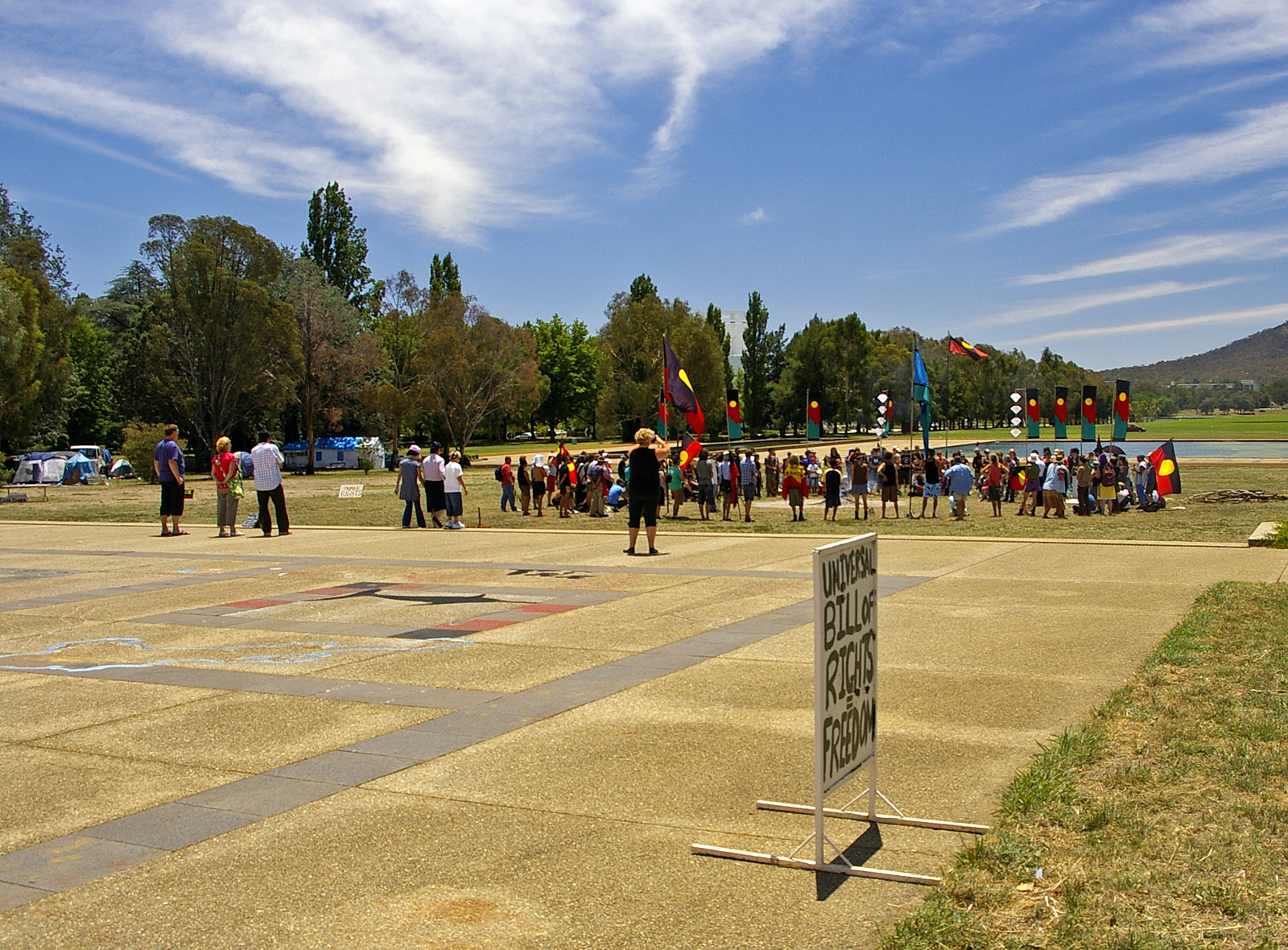
Corroboree for Sovereignty, Aboriginal Tent Embassy, January 2010

In August 2005, the Federal Government (then the fourth term of the Howard government) announced a review into the Aboriginal Tent Embassy. A non-Indigenous professional mediation firm, Mutual Mediations, was appointed by the Territories Minister, Jim Lloyd, to meet tent residents and Aboriginal leaders to develop a plan. They reached a decision on the Embassy's future early in December 2005. The key recommendation was that there should be an "evolving concept of the tent embassy without permanent camping", with seven other main recommendations which, according to Gary Foley, were designed "to bring the anarchistic embassy site effectively under government control and direction", which "would be the total antithesis of the concept of the embassy and its significance to Indigenous communities Australia wide".

=== 2012: 40th anniversary ===
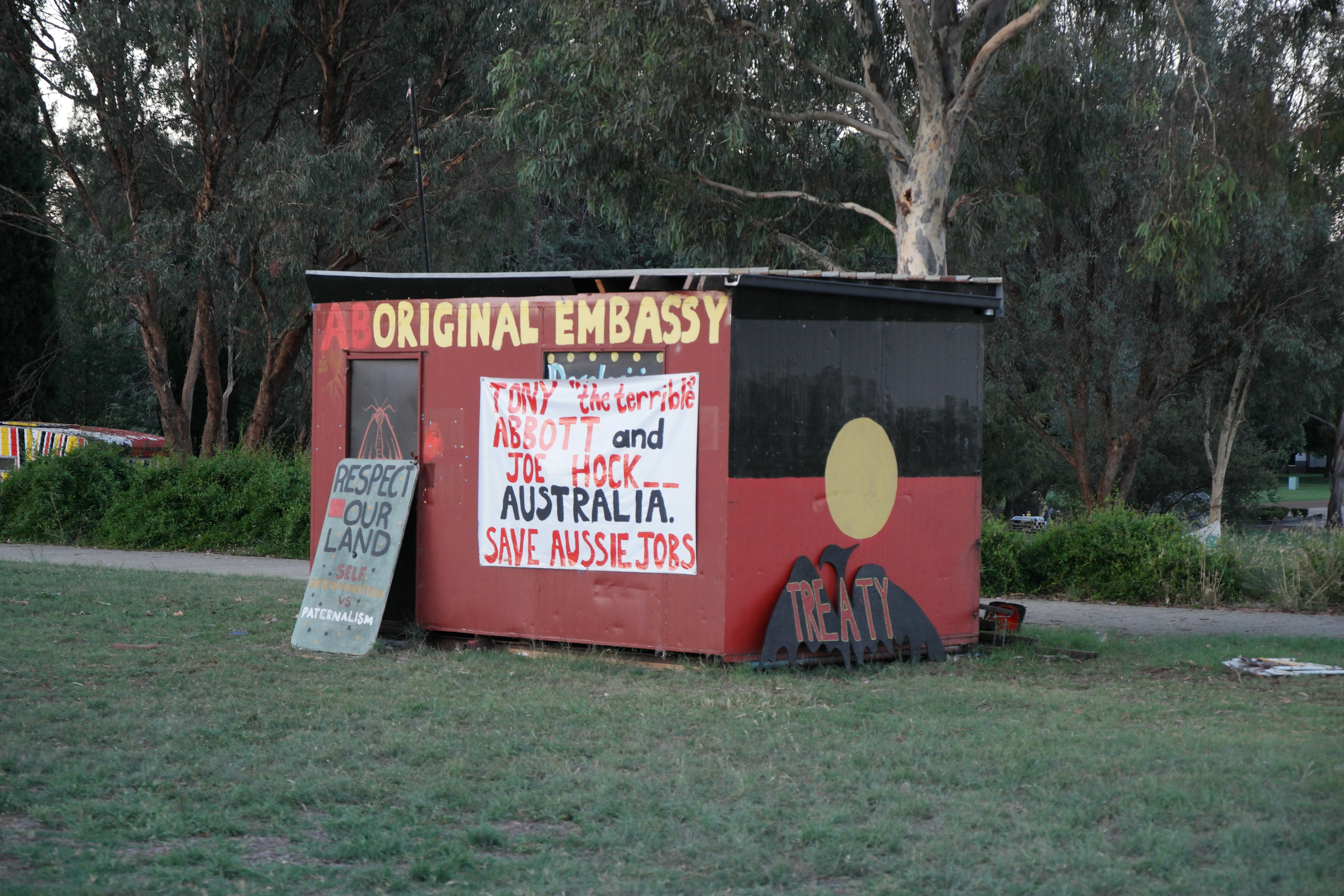
Aboriginal Tent Embassy, 2015

On Australia Day, 26 January 2012, the Embassy celebrated its fortieth anniversary. The National Congress of Australia's First Peoples planned a series of events over two days, to celebrate the struggle for Aboriginal land rights and the theatre of political protest. The ACT Government helped to fund the event, which included coachloads of attendees coming from the country, and a Skype session with Gary Foley on stage. Ghillar Michael Anderson was the only one of the original four founders still alive at this time.

What became known as the Australia Day 2012 protests occurred when Prime Minister Julia Gillard and Opposition Leader Tony Abbott went to the Lobby Restaurant, close to the embassy site. That morning Abbott had been asked whether he found the Embassy "still relevant" and he had replied "I think the Indigenous people of Australia can be very proud of the respect in which they are held by every Australian and, yes, I think a lot has changed since then and I think it probably is time to move on from that".

These comments angered activists since they felt Abbott was proposing that the Embassy should be evicted. Gillard and Abbott were hastily escorted from the restaurant under the protection of police officers, and during the scramble Gillard lost one of her shoes, which was collected by protesters. At first the Embassy posted on its Facebook page that the shoe would be returned only in exchange for stolen land, but the shoe was later returned to her.

== 2020s ==
In December 2021 and January 2022, "Sovereign Citizens" along with anti-vaxxers, staged rival protests, and set fire to the door of Old Parliament House (now housing the Museum of Australian Democracy), causing more than $4 million worth of damage. Ngunnawal elder Aunty Matilda House-Williams, who was there when the embassy was founded in 1972, condemned the fire and said the protest did not represent the embassy or Canberran Indigenous people. Some of the outsiders have been charged.

Aboriginal Tent Embassy, 2026

Aboriginal figures nearby the Aboriginal Tent Embassy, 2026

=== 2022: 50th anniversary ===
On 26 January 2022, at 50 years old, the Tent Embassy has become the longest continuous protest for Indigenous land rights in the world. Organisers said that the week of the anniversary is a chance for First Nations people to "honour and mourn our past, celebrate our survival and strategise for the next 50 years".

The day was marked by cultural events and speeches, with a focus on reparatory justice and moving forward in the future. Around 2,500 people, including Ngalan Gilbert, grandson of Kevin Gilbert, attended the main march which finished at the site of the Aboriginal Tent Embassy. At a separate event, a crowd was addressed by the only surviving member of the original embassy, Ghillar Michael Anderson, and early participant Cheryl Buchanan. The film Ningla A-Na, a documentary film charting Black activism in South-East Australia made in 1972, was screened at the event.

== In film ==
=== Ningla A-Na ===
The film Ningla A-Na, a documentary film charting Black activism in South-East Australia made in 1972, documents the events, including the eviction by police. The film, whose title means "hungry for land" (in Arrernte), is held in the National Film and Sound Archive owing to its heritage value. Directed and produced by Alessandro Cavadini (brother of producer Fabio Cavadini, with whom he later made Protected (1975), about Palm Island), the film contains interviews with Fred Hollows, Mum Shirl, Bob Maza, Carole Johnson and Paul Coe.

The term "Ningla A-na" was also used for the Black Moratorium marches on 14 July 1972.

=== Still We Rise ===
Still We Rise is a feature documentary film about Aboriginal activism of the 1970s and since, marking the 50th anniversary of the Tent Embassy. The film was written and directed by Indigenous filmmaker John Harvey, who is from Sabai in the Torres Strait Islands. It premiered on ABC Television on 8 December 2022. It features interviews with Paul Coe, Gary Foley, Bobbi Sykes, Chicka Dixon, and Denis Walker, and music by King Stingray, Dan Sultan, Miiesha and others. Billy Craigie, Bertie Williams, Tony Coorey, and Ghillar Michael Anderson also appear in the film, which celebrates their activism and asks the question why they are not better known today. It was made by Tamarind Tree Pictures in association with VicScreen, with some financing by Screen Australia, and developed and produced in association with the Australian Broadcasting Corporation. Harvey was informed by talks with Gary Foley, now an academic and historian. Still We Rise had a special screening at ACMI in Melbourne on 18 December 2022, which included a Q&A with Harvey and Gary Foley, and is freely available to Australian viewers on ABC iview. Harvey has produced and directed several other short films and television series.

== Significance and commentary ==
At the time, the Tent Embassy focused international attention on injustices in Australia, which had gone largely unnoticed hitherto.

According to Australian scholar Lynda-June Coe, who is a niece of two of the co-founders, the Aboriginal activist movement traces its origins back to Aboriginal warriors who resisted European colonisation during the frontier wars. Coe also stated that the Tent Embassy serves as a symbol which extends back to the arrival of the First Fleet in 1788, as Aboriginal Australians never signed a treaty with European colonists nor ceded any of their land; reflecting on the five decades of the Tent Embassy's existence, Coe argued that the aims of the Aboriginal activist movement as they were formulated in the 1970s are still relevant to young Aboriginal people today.

The CEO of the National Aboriginal and Torres Strait Islander Legal Services, Jamie McConnachie, sees the Tent Embassy as a kind of "anchor", which has "created a sea of activism in their communities and beyond". Some of these issues include the high proportion of Indigenous Australians in prison, Aboriginal deaths in custody, the age of criminal responsibility in Australia, and the debate around Australia Day.

Ken Wyatt, Minister for Indigenous Australians, said on the occasion of the 50th anniversary in 2022 that he did not think that the embassy was redundant.

It's a powerful symbol that has left a legacy to remind all Australians that it took four men sitting under an umbrella to heighten an awareness of many of the challenges that exist within the Aboriginal communities across the geographic diversity of this nation.

Federal MP Linda Burney said on the 50th anniversary that it was just as relevant now as it had ever been:

...it still says something very powerful to the Australian public, and that is that Aboriginal Australia has been here for a very long time, and will continue to be here into the future... it's a symbol that has come to represent to me personally, the struggle, the political struggle, in particular, of Aboriginal Australia.

== Other Aboriginal tent embassies ==
In 2012, there were six other tent embassies dotted around the nation.

The Redfern Tent Embassy was set up in 2014 by Lyall Munro Jnr, his wife Jenny Munro, and other activists, to protest against a planned redevelopment of The Block in the Sydney suburb of Redfern.

== See also ==
- Australian Aboriginal sovereignty
- Redfern Aboriginal Tent Embassy
