= Marcia Langton =

Australian Aboriginal scholar and activist

Marcia Langton AO FASSA FAHA FTSE
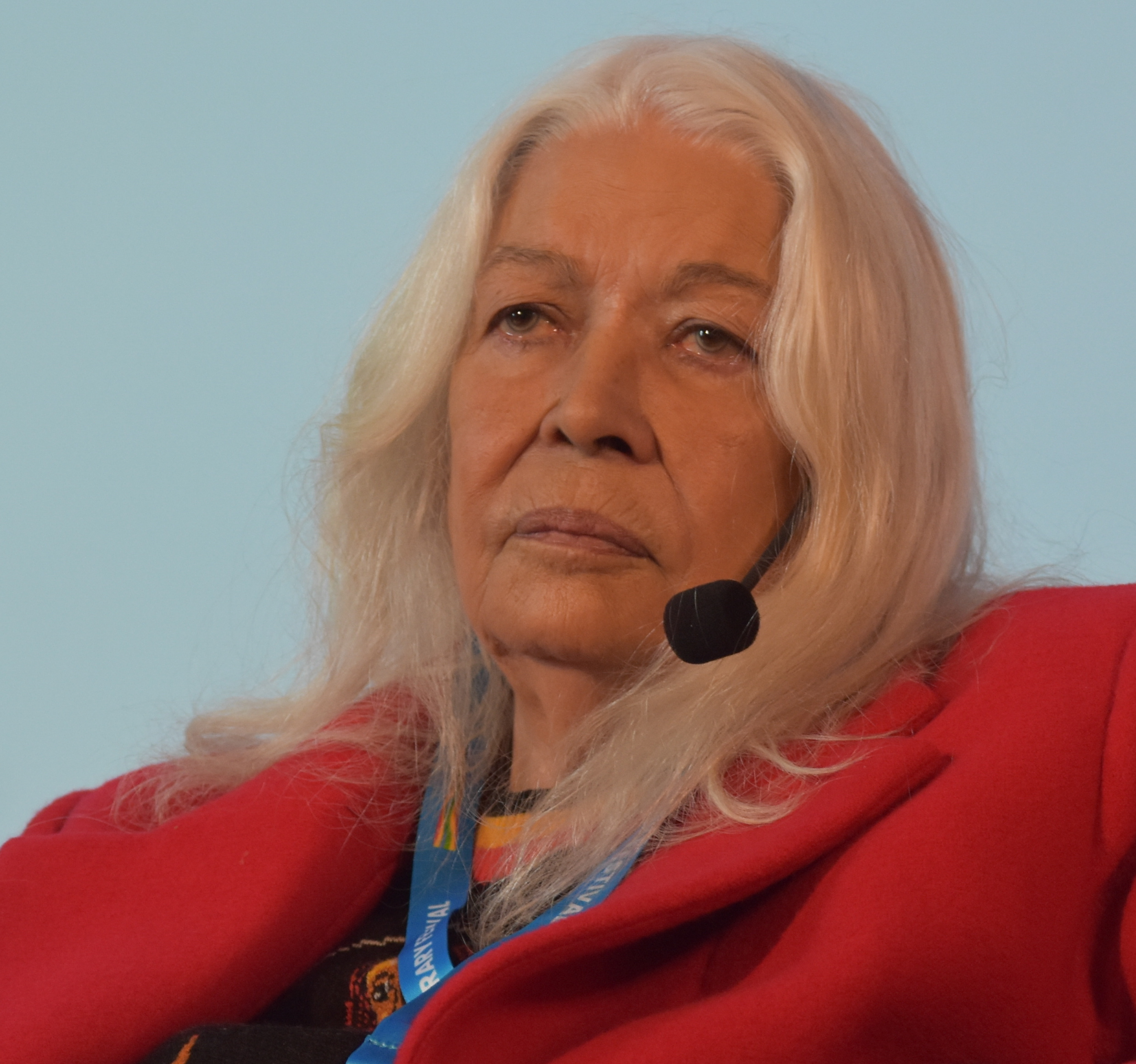
- Langton in 2025 at Queenscliffe Literary Festival
- Born: 31 October 1951 (age 75); Brisbane, Queensland, Australia
- Education: Australian National University (BA), Macquarie University (PhD)
- Occupations: Anthropologist, geographer
- Employer: University of Melbourne
- Organization: Alice Springs Friends of East Timor

Marcia Lynne Langton (born 31 October 1951) is an Aboriginal Australian writer and academic. As of 2022 she is the Redmond Barry Distinguished Professor at the Melbourne School of Population and Global Health, University of Melbourne. Langton is an activist for Indigenous rights.

== Early life and education ==
Marcia Langton was born on 31 October 1951 to Kathleen (née Waddy) and grew up in south-central Queensland and Brisbane as a descendant of the Yiman and Bidjara heritage, both groups being Aboriginal Australian peoples. Her father had no presence in her life. Her mother married Scots-born, ex-Korean War veteran Douglas Langton when Marcia was a year old. Marcia was close to her maternal grandmother Ruby and her sister Teresa.

She and her mother moved often, without secure housing or employment, and she attended nine primary schools. She attended Aspley State High School from 1964 to 1968, where she was a prefect and good student, but after objecting to racism in a school text, she was expelled.

She was taken to her first political meeting by Oodgeroo Noonuccal at the age of 16, so by the time she enrolled for a law/arts degree at the University of Queensland in 1969, she had already become an activist. She advocated for Indigenous land rights and against racism. She spent one year at the university, during which time she fell pregnant with her son.

After hearing that Brisbane police were clamping down on Indigenous activists (at the beginning of Joh Bjelke-Petersen's premiership), she left the country aged 18, with her son. For five years she travelled and worked, from New Guinea to Japan, across Asia to Switzerland and North America. After her return (in early 1975) she moved to Sydney, perceiving it as less racist than Brisbane. While in Japan, where she lived for six months, and Asia, she found "racial invisibility" for the first time; she was not perceived as different because she was black. In Japan, Langton learnt about Buddhism, and later became a self-described "lazy Buddhist". Wiradjuri artist Brook Andrew painted Langton in a Buddhist pose. On her travels she met US servicemen who had served in the Vietnam War, and became acquainted with Afro American culture and the Black Power movement. After flying to New York City, she was kidnapped by people traffickers, but escaped.

In Sydney, Langton worked as nutrition co-ordinator at the Aboriginal Medical Service, and also worked with Fred Hollows in optical health.

After moving to Canberra in 1977, she studied anthropology at the Australian National University, working part-time, and graduated in 1984.

In 2005 she completed a PhD in geography at Macquarie University.

== Early career ==
In Canberra, Langton worked for the Australian Law Reform Commission in its work on recognising customary law. She became a history research officer at the Australian Institute of Aboriginal Studies (now AIATSIS).

In 1988 she moved to Alice Springs in the Northern Territory and worked as a senior anthropologist for the Central Land Council for six years, before being made head of the Aboriginal Issues Unit of the Royal Commission into Aboriginal Deaths in Custody, which she undertook for 15 months over 1989 to 1990. After this, she wrote Too Much Sorry Business, in which she connected the high number of Aboriginal men who died in police or prison custody in the Northern Territory to Indigenous mortality rates, and to alcohol and other substance abuse.

Langton was then appointed assistant head of the Division of Aboriginal and Islander Affairs in Queensland (under the government of Wayne Goss), but was forced to resign 15 months later.

She also worked for the Australian Film Commission, Cape York Institute for Policy and Leadership, and, in the early 1990s, the Cape York Land Council, where she met lawyer Noel Pearson. In 1992, Langton was appointed chair of AIATSIS in Canberra.

== Academic career ==
In 1995, Langton moved full-time into university research and teaching. She spent five years as Ranger Professor of Aboriginal and Torres Strait Islander Studies at Northern Territory University (now Charles Darwin University) in Darwin before moving to Melbourne.

In 2000 she was appointed Foundation Chair of Australian Indigenous Studies at the University of Melbourne, then in the arts faculty, where in 2016, she became a distinguished professor, and in 2017, associate provost. In 2006, she moved to the university's faculty of medicine, to work with Indigenous academic and social health activist Ian Anderson; the Indigenous Studies Centre also moved to this faculty.

Her 2005 PhD thesis in geography at Macquarie University applies phenomenological theory to the study of Aboriginal peoples of the eastern Cape York Peninsula.

In 2012 she became the patron of the Indigenous Reading Project, a charitable organisation that uses digital technology to improve the reading ability of Aboriginal and Torres Strait Islander children.

== Activism and political views ==
=== 1970s ===
During the early 1970s, Langton was one of three leaders of the Communist League, a group founded by Queensland doctor John McCarthy, Peter Robb and others in 1972, which merged into the Socialist Workers Party around 1976.

In 1976, Langton, Bobbi Sykes, Sue Chilly (also spelt Chilli), (Note: Iris Susanne (or Suzanne) Colleen Chilly, born 1954) and Naomi Mayers formed the Black Women's Action (BWA) group, which later evolved into the Roberta Sykes Foundation. BWA published a monthly community newspaper for Aboriginal people, Koori Bina (meaning "Black ears"), which ran until June 1979. Langton later wrote that the founders of the paper had been inspired by Abo Call, which had been published in 1938 in Sydney by Jack Patten (co-founder of the Aborigines Progressive Association) and Percy Reginald Stephensen. She was also involved in a number of other Black community publications, and wrote in the introduction to her 1979 Listing of Aboriginal periodicals: "the experience of producing those newspapers within a hostile white environment... because it has the power and resources, has historically defined us".

In December 1976, Langton played the part of Vena, a nurse, in Here Comes the Nigger by Gerry Bostock, which was played at Black Theatre in Redfern, Sydney.

Langton went to Canberra for a year in 1977, after being elected general secretary to the Federal Council for the Advancement of Aborigines and Torres Strait Islanders, where she enrolled for an anthropology degree at ANU.

=== 1999 to present ===
In October 1999, Langton was one of five Indigenous leaders who were granted an audience with Queen Elizabeth II to discuss an apology and Indigenous recognition in the Australian Constitution.

In 2007, Langton supported The Intervention by the Howard government. By this time, along with Noel Pearson, she believed that there was a crisis in over-dependence on welfare among Indigenous people, and there was a need for greater Indigenous responsibility. These views put Pearson and Langton at odds with many other Indigenous activists.

In May 2008, the federal government appointed her to the Native Title Payments Working Group looking into reform of the Australian native title process.

She has argued that settlement with mining companies on Aboriginal land often benefits local interests more than the Australian Government, and that the proposed 2010 resource tax on mining in Australia needed a redesign to support Indigenous rights and employment. She advocated for agreements to be made directly between mining groups and Indigenous owners of the land, with Aboriginal corporations as mediators. She worked with Rio Tinto at their headquarters in Melbourne, and was impressed with their understanding of native title since the passing of the Native Title Act 1993 and their interest in working with Aboriginal communities.

In 2017 she campaigned against environmentalists, arguing that they were thwarting native title reform as part of their case against the Adani Carmichael coal mine. Her criticisms of Indigenous litigants have been rebuffed by Indigenous lawyer Tony McAvoy SC.

On 30 October 2019, Langton and Tom Calma were announced as co-chairs of the Senior Advisory Group—convened by Ken Wyatt and consisting of 20 leaders and experts from across the country—of the proposed Indigenous voice to government under the Morrison government. In July 2021 the Indigenous Voice Co-design Process panel released its final report, often referred to as the Calma Langton report, outlining a model of a proposed Voice.

Under the Albanese government elected in 2022, the proposal changed to be an Indigenous Voice to Parliament, enshrined in the Australian Constitution. This change, along with the recognition of Indigenous Australians in the Constitution, was put to a referendum in Australia. Langton campaigned for a Yes vote in the referendum. In the course of answering an audience question at a community information meeting, she said of the No campaign that "Every time the No case raises one of their arguments, if you start pulling it apart you get down to base racism — I'm sorry to say it but that's where it lands — or just sheer stupidity". For this she was criticised in some sectors of the media and various politicians from the No campaign, including a headline by The Australian (later corrected) which read "No Voters Branded Racist, Stupid". This was followed by Opposition Leader Peter Dutton publishing on Instagram: "No voters branded 'racist, stupid' by prominent Voice campaigner Marcia Langton". Langton refuted and criticised the reporting of her statements, and said that she would be taking legal advice with regard to Dutton's post. The referendum took place on 14 October 2023, and was defeated in all six states and by the national majority.

On 1 November 2023, Langton strongly backed uniform alcohol restrictions across the Northern Territory.

=== Current roles and views ===
Langton is a frequent media commentator and has served on various high-level committees on Indigenous issues. These have included the Council for Aboriginal Reconciliation, the directorship of the Centre for Indigenous Natural and Cultural Resource Management, the chair of the Indigenous Higher Education Advisory Council and the chair of the Cape York Institute for Policy and Leadership.

In 2023, she was regarded as conservative by left-wing and socialist organisations, but is generally apolitical.

== Other activities and roles ==
Langton has worked in other countries (notably Canada and East Timor) on the rights of indigenous peoples, with special reference to conservation and environmental issues and has published works on issues of gender and identity, resource management and substance abuse.

She is also known as a film and art critic and has appeared in several films, including Jardiwarnpa: a Warlpiri fire (an episode in the film series Blood Brothers) and Night Cries: A Rural Tragedy.

In 2012, she gave the Boyer Lectures titled The Quiet Revolution: Indigenous People and the Resources Boom.

She has been on the judging panel for the annual Horne Prize since its inception in 2016.

== Recognition and honours ==
Langton was made a member of the Order of Australia in the 1993 Queen's Birthday Honours for "service as an anthropologist and advocate of Aboriginal issues". She was promoted to officer of the Order of Australia in the 2020 Australia Day Honours for "distinguished service to tertiary education, and as an advocate for Aboriginal and Torres Strait Islander people".

Other recognition has included:

- 2001: Fellow, Academy of Social Sciences in Australia
- 2001: Inducted onto the Victorian Honour Roll of Women
- 2002: Neville Bonner Award for Indigenous Education (jointly with Larissa Behrendt)
- 2005: Named one of Australia's top 20 intellectuals in a survey conducted by The Sydney Morning Herald
- 2008: Winner, Victorian Premier's Literary Awards, Alfred Deakin Prize for an Essay Advancing Public Debate, for Trapped in the Aboriginal Reality Show
- 2008: Listed as 7th in a list of Australia's top 40 public intellectuals by the API Network
- 2011: Finalist, Female Actor of the Year, in Deadly Sounds Aboriginal and Torres Strait Islander Music, Sport, Entertainment and Community Awards
- 2012: Fellow of Trinity College (University of Melbourne)
- 2016: Fellow of Emmanuel College at The University of Queensland
- 2016: University of Melbourne Redmond Barry Distinguished Professor, a continuing role
- 2017: First Associate Provost at the University of Melbourne
- 2019: Winner, Indie Book Awards, for Illustrated Non-Fiction, for Welcome to Country: A Travel Guide to Indigenous Australia
- 2020: Commended, New South Wales Premier's Literary Awards, Indigenous Writer's Prize, for Welcome to Country: A Travel Guide to Indigenous Australia
- 2020: International Astronomical Union's Working Group for Small Body Nomenclature formally approves the asteroid 1979 ML_{1} as 7809 Marcialangton, in honour of her efforts to incorporate Aboriginal astronomical perspectives into the Australian National Curriculum
- 2021: Honorary Fellow of the Australian Academy of Technology and Engineering
- 2025: Inaugural winner, Rechnitz Memorial Award, Academy of the Social Sciences in Australia
- 2026: Fellow of the Australian Academy of the Humanities

== Personal life ==
Langton has a son, who lives in New Zealand, and a daughter who is a lawyer.

== Selected works ==
=== Books ===
- Jones, R.L., Waghorne, J. & Langton, M. (eds.). 2025. Dhoombak Goobgoowana: A History of Indigenous Australia and the University of Melbourne. V2: Voice. Melbourne University Press. ISBN ebook 9780522880427
- Corn, A., Langton, M. & Curkpatrick, S. (eds.). 2024. Indigenous Knowledge: Australian Perspectives. Melbourne University Publishing.
- Jones, R.L., Waghorne, J. & Langton, M. (eds.). 2024. Dhoombak Goobgoowana: A History of Indigenous Australia and the University of Melbourne. V2: Voice. Melbourne University Press. ISBN ebook 9780522880441
- Langton, M. & Ryan, J. (eds.) 2024. 65,000 Years: A Short History of Australian Art. Thames and Hudson. ISBN 9781760764210
- Langton, M. 2023. The Welcome to Country Handbook: A Guide to Indigenous Australia. Hardie Grant Travel. ISBN 1741178223
- Langton, M. & Corn, A. 2023. First Knowledges Law: The Way of the Ancestors. Thames & Hudson. ISBN 9781760762827
- Langton, M., Smith, K., Eastman, T., O’Neill, L., Cheesman, E., & Rose, M. (2020). Family violence policies, legislation and services: Improving access and suitability for Aboriginal and Torres Strait Islander men. Research report, 26. Sydney: ANROWS.
- Langton, M. 2018 (2nd ed. 2021). Welcome to Country: A Travel Guide to Indigenous Australia. Hardie Grant Travel.
- Davis, M. and Langton M. (eds.). 2016. It's Our Country: Indigenous Arguments for Meaningful Constitutional Recognition and Reform. Melbourne University Press.
- Langton M. 2013. The Quiet Revolution: Indigenous People and the Resources Boom. ABC Books.
- Langton M. and J. Longbottom (eds.) 2012. Community futures, legal architecture: foundations for Indigenous peoples in the global mining boom. London: Routledge.
- Perkins, R. and Langton M. (eds). 2008. First Australians. An Illustrated History. Melbourne University Publishing, Melbourne.
- Langton, M., Palmer, L., Mazel, O., K. Shain & M.Tehan (eds). 2006. Settling with Indigenous Peoples: Modern Treaty and Agreement Making . Annandale, NSW: Federation Press.
- Langton, M. & M. Nakata (eds). 2005. Australian Indigenous Knowledge and Libraries. Canberra: Australian Academic and Research Libraries.
- Langton, M., 2005. An Aboriginal ontology of being and place: the performance of Aboriginal property relations in the Princess Charlotte Bay area of eastern Cape York Peninsula, Australia. Unpub. PhD thesis, Human Geography/Anthropology. Sydney: Macquarie University.
- Langton, M., M. Tehan, L. R. Palmer & K. Shain (eds). 2004. Honour among nations? Treaties and agreements with Indigenous peoples. Melbourne: Melbourne University Publishing. (Choice List of Outstanding Academic Titles 2006, American Libraries Association, Choice: Current Reviews for Academic Libraries)
- Langton, M. (1998). Burning Questions: Emerging environmental issues for Indigenous peoples in northern Australia. Darwin, Northern Territory: Centre for Indigenous Natural and Cultural Resource Management, Northern Territory University. ISBN 9781876483067. Archived from the original on 7 February 2007.
- Langton M. & W. Jonas., 1994. The Little Red, Yellow and Black (and Green and Blue and White) Book: a short guide to Indigenous Australia. Canberra: AIATSIS.
- Langton, M., 1994. Valuing cultures: recognising Indigenous cultures as a valued part of Australian heritage. Council for Aboriginal Reconciliation. Canberra : Australian Govt. Pub. Service.
- Langton, M., 1993. Well, I heard it on the radio and I saw it on the television: an essay for the Australian Film Commission on the politics and aesthetics of filmmaking by and about Aboriginal people and things. Sydney: Australian Film Commission.
- Langton, M. & N. Peterson, (eds). 1983. Aborigines, Land & Land Rights. Valuing Cultures: recognising Indigenous cultures as a valued part of Australian heritage. Canberra: AGPS.
- Langton, M., 1983. After the tent embassy: images of Aboriginal history in black and white photographs Sydney: Valadon Publishing.

=== Articles ===
- Langton, M. (2010). "The Resource Curse". Griffith Review (29). Archived from the original on 11 May 2009.
- Langton, M., and O. Mazel. 2008. Poverty in the midst of plenty: Aboriginal people, the 'resource curse' and Australia's mining boom. Journal of Energy and Natural Resources Law. 26(1): 31–65.
- Langton, M., 2008. chapter in Manne, R. (ed.) "Dear Mr Rudd: Ideas for a Better Australia". Black Inc.
- Langton, M., 2007. Trapped in the Aboriginal reality show. Griffith Review Edition 19 – Re-imagining Australia. Sydney: Griffith University.
- Langton, M., 2003. chapter "Grounded and Gendered: Aboriginal Women in Australian Cinema" in French, L. (ed.) Womenvision: Women and the Moving Image in Australia. Damned Publishing, Melbourne. pp. 43–56.
- Langton, M. (2000). "'The Fire that is the Centre of Each Family' Landscapes of the Ancients" ( (PDF)). In Ann P. Hamblin (ed.). Visions of Future Landscapes. Proceedings of the 1999 Australian Academy of Science Fenner Conference on the Environment, 2–5 May 1999, Canberra. Canberra, ACT: Bureau of Rural Sciences. pp. 169–178. Archived from the original on 15 April 2012.

=== Films ===
- Night Cries: a rural tragedy (1990 short film, with Tracey Moffatt and Penny McDonald)
- Blood Brothers, a 1993 four-part Australian documentary series;
  - Jardiwarnpa: a Warlpiri fire (4th episode, written by Langton; with Ned Lander and Rachel Perkins)
- Rachel Perkins' TV series First Australians (SBS television, 2008), features many commentaries by Langton
- Here I Am, 2011 (feature fiction, directed by Beck Cole and starring Langton)
