= Ningla A-Na =

1972 documentary film

- Directed by: Alessandro Cavadini
- Written by: Alessandro Cavadini
- Produced by: Alessandro Cavadini
- Cinematography: Ian Stocks
- Edited by: Ronda MacGregor
- Music by: Gloria Fletcher
- Release date: 1972
- Running time: 72 minutes
- Country: Australia
- Language: English

Ningla A-Na (Hungry for our Land) is a 1972 Australian documentary film created by Alessandro Cavadini.

== Synopsis ==
Based around the establishment of the Aboriginal Tent Embassy in 1972, the film looks at political protests and Aboriginal organisations in Australia.

== Production and release ==
Ningla A-Na was restored and re-released in 2022, marking the 50th year of the Embassy.

== Reception ==
A review in Tribune says "Cavadini captures the vitality and the militancy of the movement to such an extent that it needs no comment. The rap sessions have a spontaneity, lack of staginess and an honesty that many other documentaries to achieve."

In The Age, Colin Bennett writes "Agree with Cavadini's strongly committed film or not, it is probably the most powerful and illuminating coverage of the black movement yet made and if seen widely at this time when land rights are again in the news should help to rid our southern audiences of a good deal of apathy."

Luke Buckmaster in The Guardian gave it 5 stars, calling it Australia's greatest ever protest movie: so alive and so galvanising it seems to have its own electromagnetic force".
