= Chicka Dixon =

Australian activist (1928–2010)

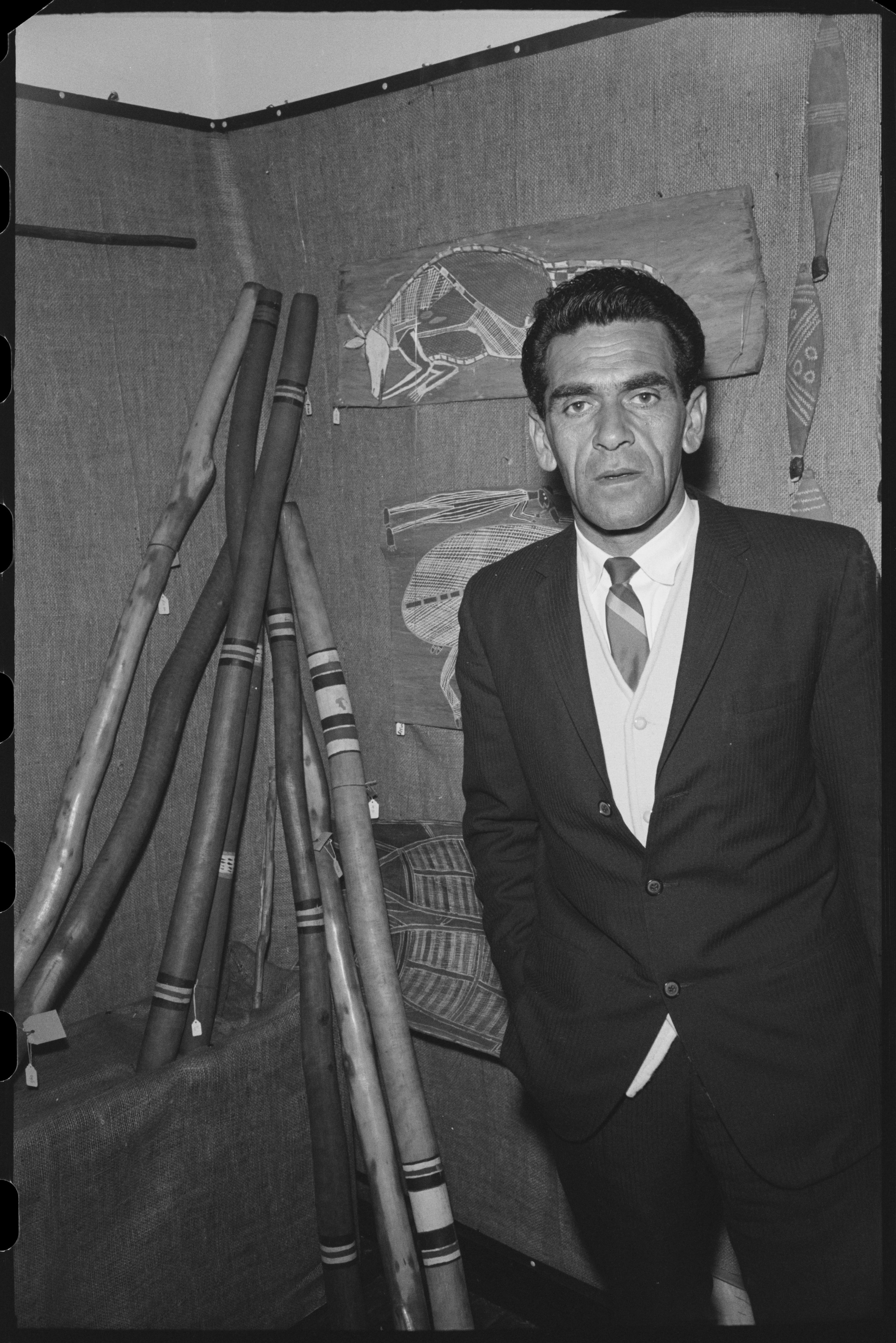
Dixon at the Foundation for Aboriginal Affairs, 1967

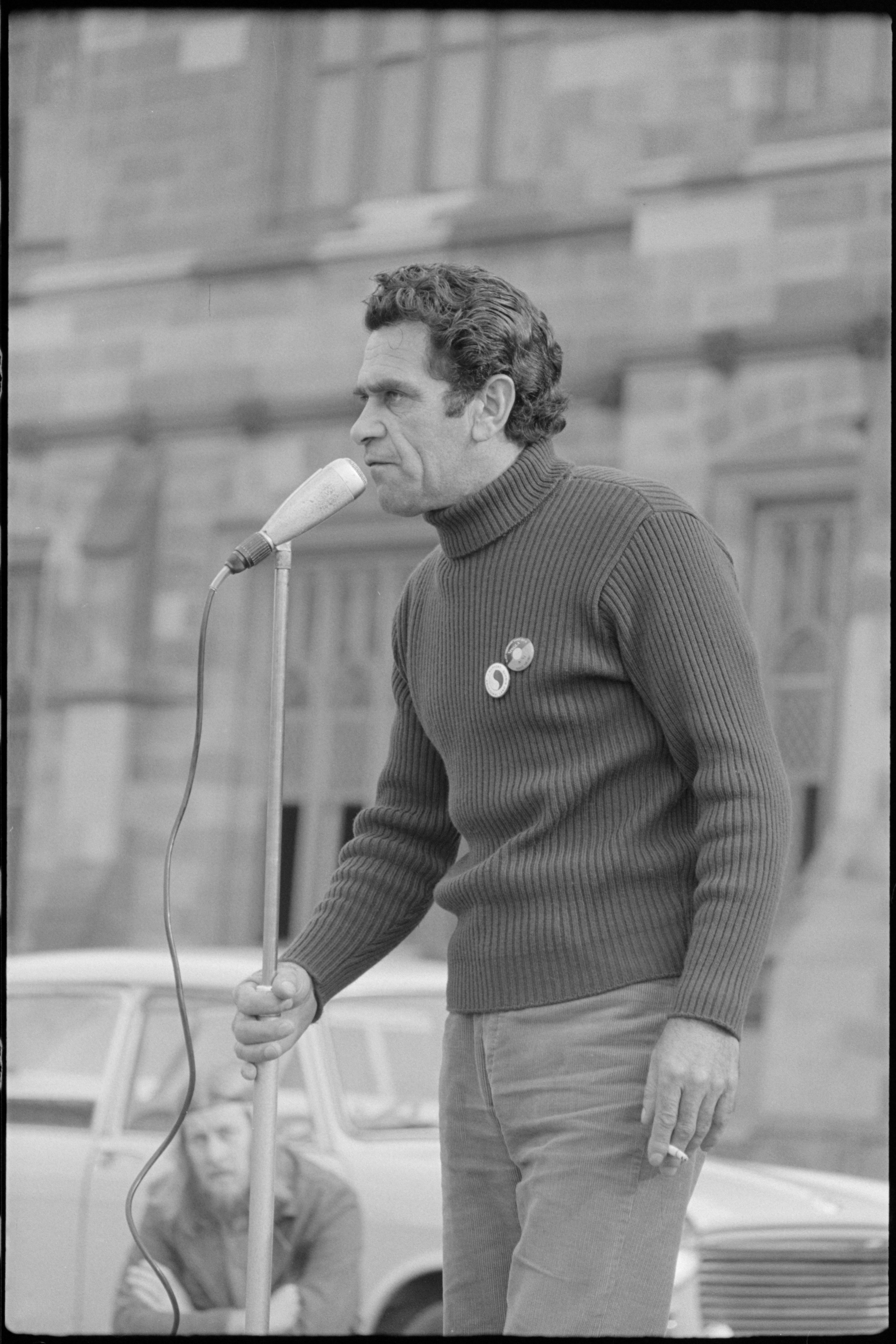
Dixon in 1972

Charles "Chicka" Dixon (5 May 1928 – 10 March 2010) was an Australian Aboriginal activist and leader. He was active in campaigns around the 1967 referendum and the Aboriginal Tent Embassy, dedicating his life to the fight for basic human rights and justice for Aboriginal and Torres Strait Islander people.

== Early life ==
Dixon was born at Wallaga Lake on the New South Wales south coast, one of thirteen children, and moved to Sydney as a teenager.

Dixon attended his first political meeting on his 18th birthday in 1946. Inspired by Jack Patten, an organiser of the 1938 Day of Mourning and the Aborigines Progressive Association, and was politically active ever since. During the 1960s he was spokesperson for the Federal Council for the Advancement of Aborigines and Torres Strait Islanders. He joined the Waterside Workers Federation in 1964.

In 1970, Dixon was instrumental in establishing Australia's first Aboriginal Legal Service in Redfern; he co-founded the Tent Embassy in Canberra in 1972. In 1972, he travelled to China to highlight the Aboriginal struggle in an attempt to shame the Australian Government into action. Qantas would not fly the group, so Dixon found an airline that would.

He was the first Aboriginal person to be appointed as a Councillor on the Australia Council and is a former chairman of the council's Aboriginal Arts Board serving from 1983 to 1986.

In 2007, reports appeared in the Sydney Morning Herald and Brisbane Times claiming Dixon had obtained 150 pages of his ASIO File. Dixon said the files were wildly inaccurate. Dixon joins activists Charles Perkins, Faith Bandler, Melbourne academic Gary Foley, author Michael Hyde, and ABC's Phillip Adams in being among those who have obtained their ASIO files and openly spoken about them in mainstream media.

== Honors and awards ==
In 1983, Dixon was named the first Aboriginal of the Year. In 2003, his portrait was commissioned by the National Portrait Gallery which did an exhibition called Proof showcasing key players in Aboriginal history.

In 2006, he was awarded an Honorary Doctorate of Letters for his eminent service to the community by the University of New South Wales.

== Death and legacy ==
During his seventies, he dealt with asbestos poisoning, a legacy from his working days on the Sydney docks as a wharfie. Dixon died at a Sydney nursing home on 20 March 2010 from asbestosis, which the Maritime Union of Australia (MUA) says he contracted as a wharf worker. He received a state funeral. He was survived by his two daughters, Rhonda and Christine, his brothers and sisters, nieces, nephews, grandchildren and extended family. The Chicka Dixon Institute for Social Change was created by Chicka's daughter Rhonda Dixon-Grovenor to honour her father.
