= Bindi Cole =

Australian photographer (born 1975)

Bindi Cole Chocka
- Born: 1975 (age 50–51); Melbourne, Victoria, Australia
- Occupations: Artist, curator and writer

Bindi Cole Chocka (born 1975) is an Australian contemporary new media artist, photographer, writer and curator of Wadawurrung heritage.

== Early life and education ==
Born in Melbourne in 1975, she holds a Bachelor of Fine Arts from Federation University (2010) and a Diploma in Applied Photography from the Northern Melbourne Institute of TAFE, which she completed in 2004. She is currently undertaking a PhD at Deakin University.

== Career ==
Cole’s work often references her life story and experiences, such as her Wadawurrung heritage, the importance of Christianity in her life, and the impact of politics, the law and other power structures on her lived experience and that of her family and community. Her artistic practice questions the way people circumscribe and misconstrue contemporary identity and experience.

=== Early works ===
Cole's first major work which came to public attention was Heart Strong (2007), an exhibition at the Koorie Heritage Trust, Melbourne. This work focused on the media's portrayal of Indigenous communities. Cole also photographed elite Indigenous sportsman for the calendar Men in Black. Cole's portrait of boxer Anthony Mundine, Do you like what you see, won the Boscia Galleries Award for Photography at the Victorian Indigenous Art Awards.

Cole's approach to art includes the use of video, text and installation as well as photography.

=== Not Really Aboriginal (2008) ===
Wathaurung Mob, 2008.

Cole's Not Really Aboriginal is a series of photographs including portraits and group photographs in which the faces of the subjects are blackened with paint. Not Really Aboriginal explores Cole's Indigenous identity and heritage, and the ways in which they are questioned by mainstream society due to her fair complexion.

The series was a result of being named by Andrew Bolt, in a series of blog posts, as an Aboriginal person who 'exploited their Aboriginality'. These statements by Bolt resulted in the Australian Federal Court case Eatock v Bolt in which Cole became a witness.

=== Sista Girls (2010) ===
Sista Girls is a 2010 photographic series which focuses on the Yimpininni, a community of transgender women in the Tiwi Islands, Northern Territory.

Cole travelled there to shoot the Sista Girls after previously photographing Tiwi Island drag performer Foxy Empire (Jason De Santis) in 2008. This work on the islands was shortlisted for the Telstra National Aboriginal and Torres Strait Islander Art Awards and, a portrait from the series, Ajay, won the 2009 Victorian Indigenous Art Awards Deadly Award.

In this work, Cole explores aspects of Indigenous identity and culture, and how that is reconciled with transgender identity with the influence of colonisation.

== Other activities ==
Cole was a witness in Eatock v Bolt, a 2011 decision of the Federal Court of Australia which held that two articles written by columnist and commentator Andrew Bolt and published in The Herald Sun newspaper had contravened section 18C, of the Racial Discrimination Act 1975. Bolt had accused Cole and other Aboriginal people of "choosing" their identity for personal benefit.

== Recognition ==
Her works have been exhibited in the Museum of Contemporary Art (Taiwan), MOCADA (New York), National Gallery of Australia, Gallery of Modern Art, Queensland, Art Gallery of Western Australia, Art Gallery of New South Wales, Museum of Contemporary Art, Shepparton Art Museum, Benalla Art Gallery and Horsham Regional Art Gallery, Victoria. In 2010, Cole was named one of Melbourne’s Top 100 Most Influential People by The Age.

=== Awards ===
- National Photography Portrait Prize, National Portrait Gallery – Finalist (2007)
- William & Winifred Bowness Photography Award, Monash Gallery of Art – Finalist (2007)
- National Photography Portrait Prize, National Portrait Gallery – Finalist (2007)
- Victorian Indigenous Art Award, Boscia Galleries Award for Photography – Winner (2007)
- 25th Telstra Aboriginal & Torres Strait Islander Art Award – Finalist (2008)
- Victorian Indigenous Art Awards – Finalist (2008)
- Victorian Indigenous Art Awards, Deadly Art Award – Winner (2009)
- William & Winifred Bowness Photography Award – Monash Gallery of Art – Finalist (2010)
- 27th National Aboriginal & Torres Strait Islander Telstra Art Awards – Finalist (2010)
- Melbourne Festival Art Trams – winning tram design (2013)
- Victorian Indigenous Art Award, Art Gallery of Ballarat – Highly Commended (2013)
- The Blake Prize, UNSW Galleries – Finalist (2014)
- Victorian Indigenous Art Award, Art Gallery of Ballarat – Finalist (2014)
- The Substation Contemporary Art Prize, The Substation – Finalist (2014)
- Wyndham Art Prize, Wyndham Art Gallery – Winner (2015)
- Redlands Konica Minolta Art Prize, National Art School – Invitation Only (2015)
- National Artist Self-Portrait Prize, University of Queensland Art Museum – Invitation Only (2015)
