= Hate speech laws in Australia =

Hate speech laws in Australia give redress to someone who is the victim of discrimination, vilification or injury on grounds that differ from one jurisdiction to another. Since the 20th century, all Australian states and territories had introduced legislation to give redress when a person is victimised on account of skin colour, ethnicity, national origin, or race. Some jurisdictions have also given redress when a person is victimised on account of religion, disability, gender identity, HIV/AIDS status, or sexual orientation. Section 18C of the Commonwealth Racial Discrimination Act 1975 makes racial vilification a civil offence, although attempts to make racial vilification a criminal offence have failed. Following the 2025 Bondi Beach shooting, a bill was introduced by the Albanese government to define certain types of hate speech that would be a criminal offence. On 20 January 2026, the bill was passed by both Houses of Parliament, to be known as the Combatting Antisemitism, Hate and Extremism (Criminal and Migration Laws) Act 2026.

== Federal ==
The Racial Discrimination Act 1975 forbids hate speech on several grounds. The Act makes it "unlawful for a person to do an act, otherwise than in private, if: the act is reasonably likely, in all the circumstances, to offend, insult, humiliate or intimidate another person or a group of people; and the act is done because of the race, colour or national or ethnic origin of the other person, or of some or all of the people in the group." An aggrieved person can lodge a complaint with the Australian Human Rights Commission. If the complaint is validated, the Commission will attempt to conciliate the matter. If the Commission cannot negotiate an agreement which is acceptable to the complainant, the complainant's only redress is through the Federal Court.

In 2002, the Federal Court applied the Act in the case of Jones v Toben. The case involved a complaint about a website which contained material that denied the Holocaust. The Federal Court ruled that the material was a violation of the Act.

Section 474.17 of the Criminal Code makes it an offence to use a carriage service such as the Internet in a manner which reasonable persons would regard as menacing, harassing or offensive. Federal criminal law, therefore, is available to address racial vilification where the element of threat or harassment is also present, although it does not apply to material that is merely offensive.

Following the controversial 2011 Eatock v Bolt decision convicting right-wing columnist Andrew Bolt of violating 18C for his newspaper columns on "fair-skinned aborigines", then-Liberal Party leader Tony Abbott campaigned on a promise to repeal 18C of the Racial Discrimination Act. In 2014, after Abbott's election as Prime Minister of Australia, then-Attorney-General George Brandis put forth a bill which would have significantly weakened 18C but not repealed it entirely. The measure to weaken 18C failed, primarily due to extensive lobbying in favour of 18C from Australia's Jewish community.

=== Human Rights and Anti-Discrimination Bill 2012 ===
In 2012, under the Gillard government, then-Attorney-General Nicola Roxon proposed the Human Rights and Anti-Discrimination Bill 2012, which would have made it illegal to discriminate on the basis of age, breastfeeding, disability, family responsibilities, gender identity, immigrant status, industrial history, marital or relationship status, medical history, nationality or citizenship, political opinion, potential pregnancy, pregnancy, race, religion, sex, sexual orientation or social origin. Critics argued the law was too restrictive and would shift the burden of proof to the person accused of discrimination. While this proposed law was broadly supported by the Australian Human Rights Commission, many Australian human rights organisations and the Australian Greens (who opined that the proposed law did not go far enough), it was narrowly defeated in Parliament.

=== 2026 reforms ===
Following the 2025 Bondi Beach shooting, which targeted Jewish Australians, prime minister Anthony Albanese announced reforms to hate speech laws focused on antisemitism. The Combatting Antisemitism, Hate and Extremism Bill 2026 passed Parliament on 20 January 2026, with the bill giving Australian Security Intelligence Organisation (ASIO) and the relevant minister powers to outlaw hate groups and introducing aggravated offences for religious officials, such as preachers, who advocate violence or extremist rhetoric. The bill also initially included provisions to make racial vilification a criminal offence, but these measures were removed from the bill after it failed to find support in Parliament. In reaction to these proposed laws, the National Socialist Network, a neo-Nazi organisation, announced it would disband.

The Bill passed both houses of parliament on 20 January 2026, It passed in the House 116 votes to 7, and 38-22 in the senate and would come into force as the Combatting Antisemitism, Hate and Extremism (Criminal and Migration Laws) Act 2026 the day after receiving royal assent.

As of May 2026, there is a constitutional challenge from the National Socialist Network (NSN) related to the constitutionality of the 2026 hate speech and hate group legislation.

== Australian Capital Territory ==
The Discrimination Act 1991 is similar to the law in New South Wales.

In 2016 the law was amended to include a proscription of actions inciting hatred toward, revulsion of, serious contempt for, or severe ridicule of a person or group of people on the ground of any of the following(a) disability; (b) gender identity; (c) HIV/AIDS status; (d) race; (e) religious conviction; (f) sexuality. Prior to the passage of these amendments, religion in particular was not included.

== New South Wales ==
In 1989, by an amendment to the Anti-Discrimination Act 1977, New South Wales became the first state to make it unlawful "for a person, by a public act, to incite hatred towards, serious contempt for, or severe ridicule of, a person or group of persons on the ground of the race of the person or members of the group". The amendment also created a criminal offence for inciting hatred, contempt or severe ridicule towards a person or group on the grounds of race by threatening physical harm (towards people or their property) or inciting others to threaten such harm. "Homosexual vilification" is also prohibited under the Act. Prosecution of the offence of serious vilification requires consent from the Attorney General of New South Wales and carries a maximum penalty of a $10,000 fine or 6 months imprisonment for an individual—$100,000 for a corporation. An offence has not yet been prosecuted under this law.

As of 1994, the Act has had various setbacks in its process to handle complaints, such as complaints not being proceeded with due to the lack of evidence in cases and those pursuing the act of discrimination losing interest in their own complaint or settling out of court under non-disclosure agreements. Further, due to the nature of discrimination reports in NSW, the Board receives multiple complaints stemming from a single act of vilification and therefore is required to address each complaint separately, which can create dissonance between the resolutions desired by each individual or group.

In June 2018, both houses of the Parliament of New South Wales unanimously passed and the Governor of New South Wales signed an urgent bill without amendments called the Crimes Amendment (Publicly Threatening and Inciting Violence) Bill 2018 to repeal the vilification laws within the Anti-Discrimination Act 1977 and replace it with criminal legislation with up to an explicit three-year term of imprisonment. The legislation went into effect on 13 August 2018 - by proclamation on 10 August 2018.

== Northern Territory ==
The Anti-Discrimination Act 1992 prohibits discrimination and harassment in activities associated with education, work, accommodation, services, clubs, and insurance or superannuation.

== Queensland ==
Queensland's Anti-Discrimination Act 1991 and amendments create laws that are similar to Tasmania's. In 2001, the Islamic Council of Queensland brought the first action under the Act for victimisation on account of religion. The Islamic Council complained that the respondent Mr. Lamb, a candidate in a federal election, had expressed some unfavourable opinions about Muslims in an electioneering pamphlet. Walter Sofronoff, for the Anti-Discrimination Tribunal, dismissed the action on the ground that Mr. Lamb did not intend to incite hatred or contempt but rather wanted to let the electors know his opinions on political matters.

On 5 March 2026, the Queensland government enacted a new hate speech law that banned the slogans "From the river to the sea" and "Globalise the intifada", which are used by some supporters of Palestine against Israeli occupation. One week later, a woman was arrested for wearing a sleeveless shirt with the first slogan, and a speaker at a pro-Palestinian rally was also arrested for explaining to the attendees what the sentence meant and why, in his opinion, the government had banned it.

== South Australia ==
The Racial Vilification Act 1996 is similar to the law in New South Wales. In the 30 years since the introduction of the legislation, the law has never been used. In 2002, the Attorney-General's Department released a discussion paper entitled "Proposal for a new law against religious discrimination and vilification". Following many objections, no legislation was enacted.

== Tasmania ==
The Anti-Discrimination Act 1998 prohibits "any conduct which offends, humiliates, intimidates, insults or ridicules another person" on the basis of attributes including race, sexual orientation, religion, gender identity and disability.

Section 19 of the Act prohibits anyone from inciting hatred. The Act says:

A person, by a public act, must not incite hatred towards, serious contempt for, or severe ridicule of, a person or a group of persons on the ground of –

(a) the race of the person or any member of the group; or
(b) any disability of the person or any member of the group; or
(c) the sexual orientation or lawful sexual activity of the person or any member of the group; or
(d) the religious belief or affiliation or religious activity of the person or any member of the group.

== Victoria ==
The Racial and Religious Tolerance Act 2001 makes behaviour that incites or encourages hatred, serious contempt, revulsion or severe ridicule against another person or group of people, because of their race or religion, unlawful in Victoria. The Act went into effect on 1 January 2002. The Act also prohibits racist graffiti, racist posters, racist stickers, racist comments made in a publication, including the Internet and email, statements at a meeting or at a public rally. The Act explicitly applies to public behaviour, not personal beliefs or thoughts. From June 30, 2026 the legislation was repealed and replaced with a new Anti-Vilification Act.

== Western Australia ==
Unlike other jurisdictions, Western Australian law imposes criminal but not civil sanctions against racial vilification. In Western Australia, the Criminal Code was amended in 1989 to criminalise the possession, publication and display of written or pictorial material that is threatening or abusive with the intention of inciting racial hatred or of harassing a racial group. Penalties range between six months and two years imprisonment. The Western Australian legislation only addresses written or pictorial information—not verbal comments. The emphasis on written material arose in direct response to the racist poster campaigns of the Australian Nationalist Movement in the late 1980s and early 1990s. In 2004, the Criminal Code Amendment (Racial Vilification) Act 2004 was passed, making racial vilification punishable by 14 years imprisonment.
