= Gillian Triggs =

Australian legal scholar (born 1945)

Emeritus Professor Gillian Triggs AC
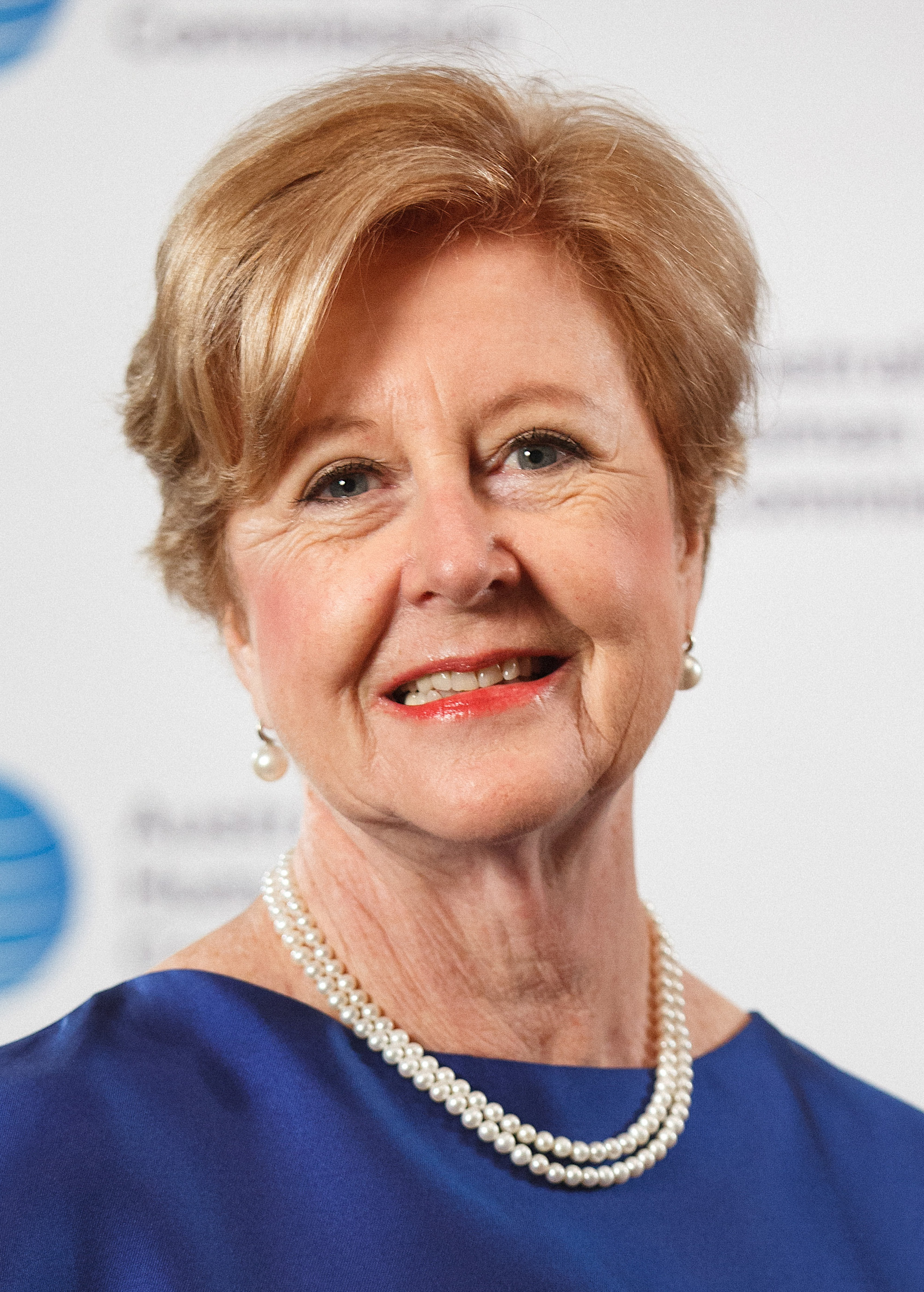
- Triggs in 2015

President of the Australian Human Rights Commission
- In office 30 July 2012 – 26 July 2017
- Appointed by: Nicola Roxon
- Preceded by: Catherine Branson KC
- Succeeded by: Ros Croucher AM

Personal details
- Born: 30 October 1945 (age 81) London, England, UK
- Citizenship: Australian / British
- Spouse: Alan Brown AM
- Children: 3
- Education: University of Melbourne; Southern Methodist University
- Occupation: Academic
- Profession: Public international lawyer; Academic
- Triggs' voice recorded September 2018

Gillian Doreen Triggs AC (born 30 October 1945) is an Australian and British public international lawyer, specialising in human rights and trade and commercial law. She is also an academic, barrister, and director. She became widely known in Australia after her appointment as president of the Australian Human Rights Commission for a five-year term in 2012.

After working in private chambers as a consultant on international law for around a decade, Triggs was appointed professor at the Melbourne Law School in 1996. She was dean of the Sydney Law School, where she was the Challis Professor of International Law between 2007 and 2012. In 2019, she was appointed by United Nations Secretary-General António Guterres as Assistant Secretary-General of the United Nations. In this capacity, she served until December 2023 as the Assistant High Commissioner for Protection.

Triggs is the recipient of many honours and awards, and was appointed a Companion of the Order of Australia in the 2025 Australia Day Honours.

== Early life and education ==
Gillian Doreen Triggs was born in London, England, on 30 October 1945 In north London, she attended a local convent school, and studied ballet. Her father was a major in the British Army, and her mother a WREN (member of the Women's Royal Navy Service). In 1958, aged 12, she migrated at the age of 12 with her family to Melbourne, Australia.

She attended University High School and then the University of Melbourne, where she was crowned "Miss University" in 1966. She earned a Bachelor of Laws in 1968.

After her admission to the Supreme Court of Victoria as a barrister and solicitor in 1969, Triggs gained a scholarship to Southern Methodist University in Texas and was awarded a Master of Laws in 1972.

== Early career and further studies ==
From 1972 to 1974 Triggs worked for the Dallas Police Department, serving as legal advisor to the chief of police on the Civil Rights Act of 1964. In 1973 she was appointed assistant professor at the University of Nebraska.

Returning to Australia, in 1975 she was appointed lecturer at the Faculty of Law at the university (later Melbourne Law School), becoming senior lecturer in 1984.

She undertook a Doctor of Philosophy in territorial sovereignty at the University of Melbourne, which was awarded in 1982. She then travelled to the Antarctic under the auspices of the Antarctic Science Advisory Council and spent two months there.

== Career in law and academia (1987–2011) ==
Triggs in 2006

In 1987 or 1988, Triggs joined Mallesons Stephen Jaques, where she worked as a consultant on international law continuing to provide consultation until 2005, including in Singapore, Paris, and Melbourne.

In 1996 Triggs was appointed professorial fellow at Melbourne Law School, a position she held until 2007. From 2000 until 2004 she was associate dean of the School of Graduate Studies, and also held a number of other roles within the Faculty of Law during this time. She was also director of both the Institute for Comparative and International Law and the Centre for Energy & Resources Law at the university. She was the director of the British Institute of International and Comparative Law from July 2005 to September 2007.

Triggs returned to Australia in 2007, to become the dean of the University of Sydney Law School and Challis Professor of International Law. She took up this role in October 2007, leaving in 2012.

Triggs was admitted to the Victorian Bar, and from 2009 to 2011, she was an honorary member at Sydney barristers' chambers Seven Wentworth Chambers.

== Australian Human Rights Commission (2012-2017) ==
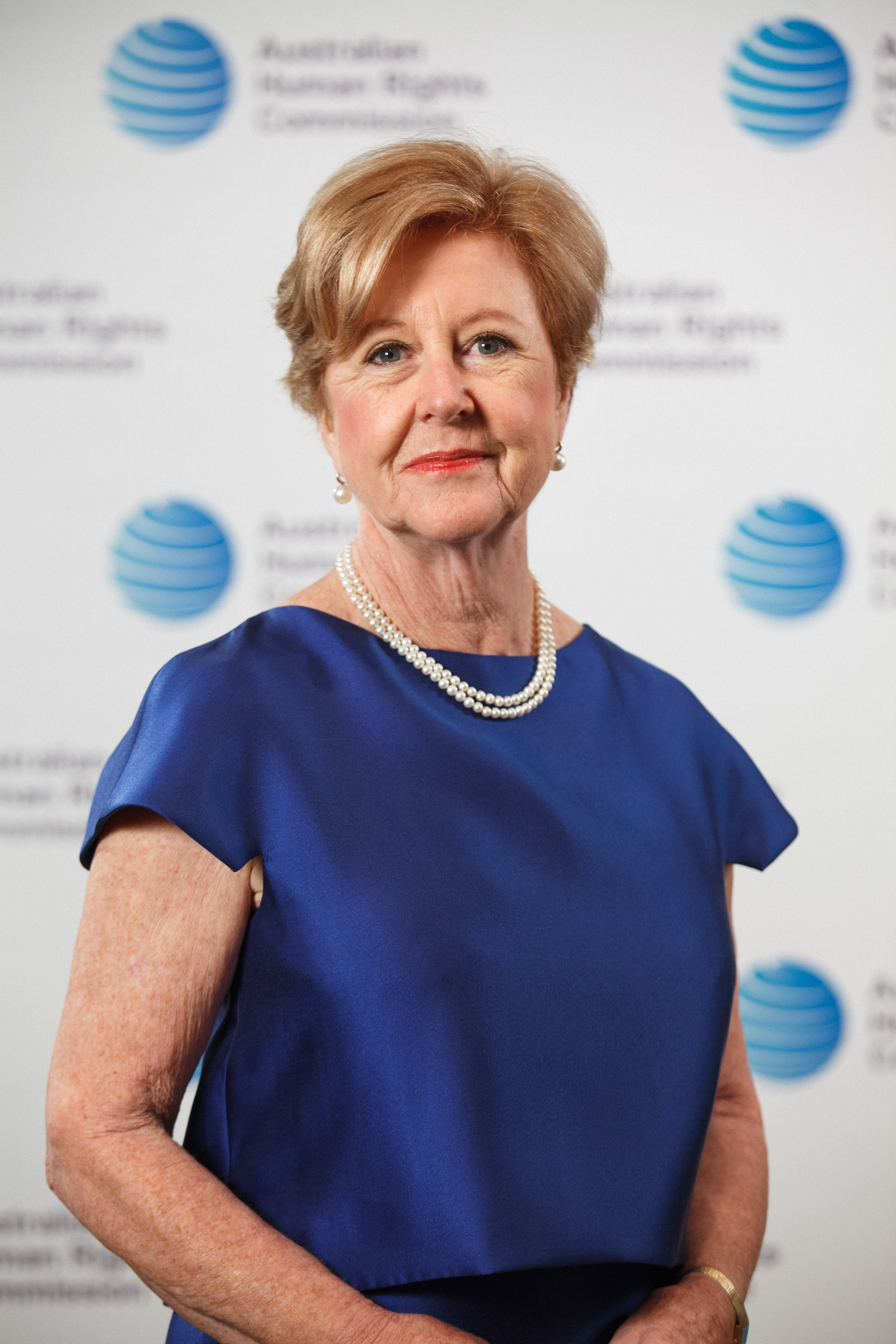
Triggs at the 2015 Human Rights Awards

On 27 July 2012, Triggs ended her term as dean of the Sydney Law School taking up her appointment as the president of the Australian Human Rights Commission, for a period of five years commencing 30 July 2012. Following the resignation of Helen Szoke, she was Acting Race Discrimination Commissioner from 30 July 2012 to 19 August 2013, until Tim Soutphommasane was appointed to the role.

On 3 February 2014, almost two years after her appointment as the president of the Australian Human Rights Commission, Triggs launched the National Inquiry into Children in Immigration Detention 2014, to "investigate the ways in which life in immigration detention affects the health, well-being and development of children". The report was published in November 2014 as "The Forgotten Children: National Inquiry into Children in Immigration Detention". From this time, there was an increase in tensions between the Australian Government under Liberal Prime Minister Tony Abbott and the Office of the President of the HRC. Some government ministers alleged that the report was politically motivated and that Triggs' decision not to conduct a review during the term of the previous Labor government was evidence of this. However, Triggs criticised both Labor and Coalition governments for ignoring their commitments and legal obligations to protect children under their care and protection. She received significant public support, and a censure motion was passed in the Senate against Attorney-General George Brandis over his attacks on her as the president of the HRC. Triggs said in 2015 that her critics often make personal attacks, to divert attention from issues she is raising, and that she would welcome a discussion with the ministers on important issues; "they never attack me on the law".

The review led to most of the children eventually being released from mandatory and indefinite detention, with the review confirmed by the government's Moss Review and the United Nations, as well as being supported by the High Court of Australia and the international legal community.

=== Racial Discrimination Act case ===
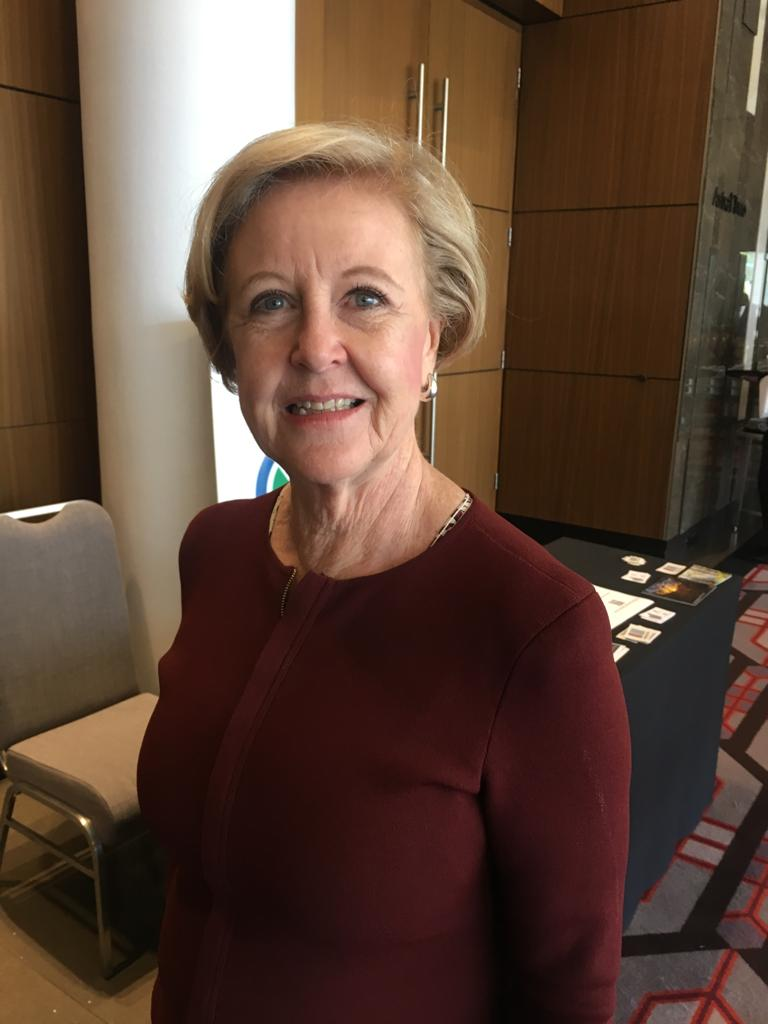
Triggs in September 2018

In 2016, Triggs received criticism for her handling of an action involving three Queensland University of Technology (QUT) students who were accused of racial vilification under Section 18C of the Racial Discrimination Act 1975 (Cth). One of the students was alleged to have breached Section 18C because of a Facebook post which read: "Just got kicked out of the unsigned Indigenous computer room. QUT stopping segregation with segregation". In November 2016, the Federal Court threw out the lawsuit and Judge Michael Jarrett concluded the claim had no reasonable prospects of success. Triggs said she had urged the government to introduce a higher threshold before the commission was obliged to investigate hate speech complaints, but defended the commission's handling of the case, saying that the complaint had "a level of substance".

Tony Morris, the lawyer who represented the students, claimed that Triggs was to blame for the case making it to court after 14 months. The HRC did not contact the students about the complaint, instead leaving that task to QUT. Triggs said that 11 months of the delay were due to a request by the complainant and QUT not to notify the students. An article by two authors affiliated with the Liberal Party and a PhD student, published in The Conversation, questioned why the AHRC did not initially reject the complaints. The authors suggested that the decision not to reject the complaints may have given the complainant false hope that the case had merit.

In November 2016, Triggs supported a proposal to change Section 18C. At the time, it was unlawful to "offend, insult, humiliate or intimidate" on the basis of race. Triggs said removing "offend" and "insult" and inserting "vilify" would be a strengthening of the laws but did not advocate for this. In February 2017, Triggs told a Senate committee that the HRC did not see a case to change 18C but recommended reforms requiring that respondents be notified of complaints and allowing the president greater powers to reject complaints.

=== Political critics ===
In October 2016, Liberal Senator Ian MacDonald alleged that Triggs had misled the Senate by stating that a journalist had misquoted comments made by her about several Australian politicians in a profile piece by The Saturday Paper. She later said that she accepted that the article was "an accurate excerpt from a longer interview". In November 2016, Prime Minister Malcolm Turnbull said that the government would not renew Triggs' commission when it expired in July 2017.

In March 2017, Triggs defended her engagement to speak at a fundraising event for the Bob Brown Foundation, after Liberal Senator Eric Abetz criticised her appearance there, as the foundation conducts overtly political activist campaigns. Other senior members of government, including Immigration Minister Peter Dutton, called for her resignation.

== UNHCR (2019–2023) ==
In 2019, she was appointed by United Nations Secretary-General António Guterres as Assistant Secretary-General of the United Nations. In this capacity, she served until December 2023 as the Assistant High Commissioner for Protection in the executive team of the United Nations High Commissioner for Refugees, Filippo Grandi.

As of 2025 Triggs remains ambassador of Australia for UNHCR.

== Recognition and honours ==
=== Honorary positions ===
- Honorary fellow, College of Law, Sydney
- Honorary Master Bencher, Inner Temple, London (2023)
- Emeritus Professor at the University of Sydney (2012)
- Professorial fellow at Melbourne Law School

=== Honours and awards ===
- 2014: Honorary doctorate, Macquarie University
- 2016: Honorary doctorate, Deakin University
- 2016: Sir Ron Wilson Human Rights Award, Australian Council for International Development
- 2017: Voltaire Award, Liberty Victoria
- 2018: Humanist of the Year
- 2018: NSW Award Winner, Women and Leadership Australia
- 2019: Winner, Judge's Choice Catalyst Award, Pro Bono Australia's Impact 25 Awards
- 2021: Inaugural Ruth Bader Ginsburg Medal, by the World Jurist Association
- 2023: Prominent Women of International Law Award
- 2023: American Society of International Law: International Law Woman of the year
- 2025: Companion of the Order of Australia, in the 2025 Australia Day Honours, "for eminent service to humanitarian and human rights law, to international relations, to social justice advocacy, and to tertiary legal education and research"

== Publications ==
Triggs has published papers on various topics of public international law, including World Trade Organization disputes resolution, energy and resources law, law of the sea, territorial sovereignty, jurisdiction and immunity, international criminal law, international environmental law and human rights.

Triggs is also author of two editions of International Law: Contemporary Principles and Practices (2006, 2011), and has co-written, written, or edited a number of books and numerous book chapters and articles. She has been editor of the journals International and Comparative Law Quarterly and Australian Mining and Petroleum Law Association Journal.

Her memoir, Speaking Up, was published by Melbourne University Press in 2018.

== Other roles ==
Among others, past roles include:

- Chair, Academic Advisory Group, Section on Energy and Resources Law, International Bar Association (SERL) (2000-4)
- Member, Attorney General's International Legal Service Advisory Council and Chair, Working Group on International Legal Education, 2001-2005
- Australian representative, Council of Jurists, Asia Pacific Forum for National Human Rights Institutions (2002-2005)
- Chair, Australian International Health Institute
- Chair, International Legal Issues Committee, Law Council of Australia
- Chair, Council of
- Fellow, Janet Clarke Hall, University of Melbourne, 1997-2005, and deputy chair of the Governing Board
- Chair and member, Appeals Board, Royal Australasian College of Surgeons, 2007-2012
- President and member, Administrative Tribunal, Asian Development Bank, 2012-2019
- Advisory Committee Member, Kaldor Centre for International Refugee Law, UNSW, 2013-2019
- Patron and chair, Justice Connect, 2017-2019
- Chair, Independent Expert Panel, Inquiry into Abuse of Office, Bullying and Sexual Harassment at the UNAIDS Secretariat, 2018
- Patron Refugee Legal Australia (as of 2025)
- Ambassador, Australia for UNHCR (as of 2025)

Apart from the countries mentioned above, Triggs has also worked in China, Vietnam, Thailand, Germany, and Iran.

== Personal life ==
Triggs first married Melbourne law professor Sandy Clark, with whom she had two daughters and a son in close succession. Their third child, Victoria, was profoundly disabled, being born with a rare chromosomal abnormality called Edwards syndrome, and was not expected to live. Clark and Triggs took her home when she was six months old, but, with two toddlers at home, found it very difficult to care for all three properly, so, reluctantly, they found a family who would become her primary carers. Victoria died around 2008 at the age of 21. Triggs' marriage to Clark ended in 1989.

She later married former Australian diplomat Alan Brown AM.

Legal offices
Preceded by Catherine Branson	President of the Australian Human Rights Commission; 2012–2017	Succeeded by Ros Croucher
