= Pat Eatock =

Australian indigenous activist and academic

June Patricia "Pat" Eatock (14 December 1937 – 17 March 2015) was an Indigenous Australian activist and academic. In 1972, she became the first Indigenous woman in Australia to stand for federal parliament. Doubts about the truth of her Aboriginal background have been raised by Roger Karge, in his book The Witness for the Prosecution.

== Early years ==
She was born in Redcliffe to Roderick Eatock, of Aboriginal and English descent, and Scottish migrant Elizabeth Stephenson Anderson. Having left school at the age of fourteen, she moved to Sydney at eighteen and married her cousin, Ron Eatock, with whom she had six children.

== Career and activism ==
In 1972 she attended a land rights conference in Alice Springs, after which she left her husband and moved to Canberra. With her baby, Eatock joined the Aboriginal Tent Embassy in Canberra and participated in the protests against its removal.

In 1972 she was the first indigenous woman to stand for federal parliament, running unsuccessfully as an independent candidate for Australian Capital Territory.

She was the first non-matriculated mature-aged student to study at the Australian National University in 1973, and graduated in 1977 with a Bachelor of Arts. In 1975 Eatock attended the Alternative Tribune to the International Women's Year World Conference in Mexico City. From 1978 to 1981 she was a project officer in the Aboriginal Unit of the Department of Social Security, and she was also a lecturer at Curtin University (1991–92, community development) and James Cook University (1997, Aboriginal studies).

From 1992 to 1996 she established and managed Perleeka Aboriginal Television.

In 2011, Eatock was the lead litigant in a case against conservative columnist Andrew Bolt, in which she and others sued Bolt under the Racial Discrimination Act (RDA) following a column alleging that fair-skinned indigenous Australians identified as Aboriginals for monetary gain. The court found for Eatock against Bolt.

Following an incident in 2012 Eatock became known as the “holder of the shoe” after then-Prime Minister Julia Gillard lost her shoe during a protest at the 40th anniversary of the Aboriginal Tent Embassy in Canberra.

== Personal life ==
Eatock died in 2015.
