= Racial Discrimination Act =

Racial Discrimination Act may refer to:

- Racial Discrimination Act 1975 – an act passed by the Australian Parliament making racial discrimination unlawful
- Racial Discrimination Act 1944 – an act passed by the Parliament of Ontario prior to the Canadian Human Rights Act
