= Eatock v Bolt =

2011 Federal Court of Australia case

- Court: Federal Court of Australia
- Decided: 28 September 2011
- Citations: [2011] FCA 1103, (2011) 197 FCR 261
- Legislation cited: Racial Discrimination Act 1975 (Cth)

Ruling
- In publishing the two articles in question the defendants contravened section 18C of the Racial Discrimination Act 1975 (Cth).

Court membership
- Judge sitting: Bromberg J

Eatock v Bolt was a 2011 decision of the Federal Court of Australia which held that two articles written by columnist and commentator Andrew Bolt and published in The Herald Sun newspaper had contravened section 18C, of the Racial Discrimination Act 1975 (Cth) (RDA). The case was controversial and instigated community debate about freedom of speech.

== Factual background ==
On 15 April 2009, The Herald Sun published an article authored by columnist Andrew Bolt in its print edition, entitled "It's so hip to be black", and republished the article on its website with the title "White is the new black". On 21 August 2009, a second article authored by Bolt was published in print and online entitled "White fellas in the black".

Pat Eatock, a woman of Aboriginal descent, brought proceedings in the Federal Court against Bolt and the proprietor of The Herald Sun, The Herald & Weekly Times Pty Ltd, suing on her own behalf and on behalf of people like her who have a paler, rather than darker skin, and who are recognised as Aboriginal persons in Australia. Eatock alleged that the two newspaper articles authored by Bolt conveyed offensive messages about light-skinned Aboriginal people, by saying that they were not genuinely Aboriginal and were pretending to be Aboriginal so they could access benefits that are available to Aboriginal people. Eatock sought a declaration that the articles contravened section 18C of the Racial Discrimination Act 1975, an injunction preventing publication or republication of the articles, and an apology from the newspaper.

=== Witnesses ===
The other Aboriginal people involved in the case and called as witnesses were Anita Heiss, Bindi Cole, Geoff Clark, Larissa Behrendt, Leeanne Enoch, Wayne Atkinson, Graham Atkinson, and Mark McMillan.

== Relevant legislation ==
Section 18C of the RDA relevantly provided:

"(1) It is unlawful for a person to do an act, otherwise than in private, if:

(a) the act is reasonably likely, in all the circumstances, to offend, insult, humiliate or intimidate another person or a group of people; and
(b) the act is done because of the race, colour or national or ethnic origin of the other person or of some or all of the people in the group."

The exemption provision in section 18D relevantly provided:

"Section 18C does not render unlawful anything said or done reasonably and in good faith:

(a) in the performance, exhibition or distribution of an artistic work; or
(b) in the course of any statement, publication, discussion or debate made or held for any genuine academic, artistic or scientific purpose or any other genuine purpose in the public interest; or
(c) in making or publishing:

(i) a fair and accurate report of any event or matter of public interest; or
(ii) a fair comment on any event or matter of public interest if the comment is an expression of a genuine belief held by the person making the comment."

== Decision ==
Justice Mordecai Bromberg found that the two articles authored by Bolt conveyed the following imputations:

- That there are pale-skinned people in Australia with essentially European ancestry but with some Aboriginal descent, of which the identified individuals are examples, who are not sufficiently Aboriginal to be genuinely identifying as Aboriginal persons but who, motivated by career opportunities available to Aboriginal people or by political activism, have chosen to identify as Aboriginal; and
- Light skin colour indicates a person who is unlikely to be sufficiently Aboriginal to be genuinely identifying as an Aboriginal person.

Justice Bromberg found that it was reasonably likely that an ordinary person within the group of pale-skinned Aboriginal persons would have been offended and insulted by the newspaper articles, in particular the challenge to the legitimacy of the identity of those individuals and the concentration on skin colour as the defining determinant of racial identity. In addition, Justice Bromberg found that it was reasonably likely that Eatock would be "humiliated and intimidated by her perception of the capacity of the articles to generate negative or confronting attitudes to her from others". Justice Bromberg found that the articles were written "because of the race, colour or ethnic origin of those people". As such, Justice Bromberg held that the publication of the two articles contravened section 18C of the RDA.

Justice Bromberg held that the exemption provision in section 18D of the RDA did not apply, because the publications were "not done reasonably and in good faith" in the making or publishing of a fair comment or in the course of any statement, publication or discussion for a genuine purpose in the public interest. Bromberg said that the articles contained "erroneous facts, distortions of the truth and inflammatory and provocative language".

Justice Bromberg also observed in passing: "The intrusion into freedom of expression is of no greater magnitude than that which would have been imposed by the law of defamation if the conduct in question and its impact upon the reputations of many of the identified individuals had been tested against its compliance with that law."

== Reaction to the decision ==
A variety of journalists and commentators took issue with the Federal Court's decision on the grounds that it restricted free speech on a matter of public interest, given Bolt's articles had addressed matters of public interest such as criteria for eligibility for public funds, money, jobs and prizes; but other journalists and commentators supported the case as an example of a legitimate restriction on freedom of expression. The political allegiance of the presiding judge to the Australian Labor Party has also been raised as an issue (Justice Bromberg had once stood for Labor pre-selection).

Bolt himself described the decision as a "terrible day for free speech" in Australia and said it represented "a restriction on the freedom of all Australians to discuss multiculturalism and how people identify themselves. I argued then and I argue now that we should not insist on the differences between us but focus instead on what unites us as human beings".

Following the decision, in October 2011 Professor Adrienne Stone of Melbourne University supported the judgement and told the ABC radio Law Report program: "I think that there is an argument to say that people who've been subjected to this kind of insult, based on their race, especially since there are groups subject to historical disadvantage, are actually entitled to have the state intervene and say that there was an unlawful act here." Legal philosopher Dale Smith of Monash University told the same program that he disagreed with the decision, saying "we should ensure freedom of expression, and then find other ways of protecting or promoting freedom from racial intolerance and prejudice that don't infringe upon people's freedom of speech." Andrew Dodd, a former presenter of the ABC TV's Media Report program, described the decision as "a slap in the face for freedom of expression... because I think it does curtail the extent to which we are able to talk freely about issues that are difficult to discuss, which may have a public interest component, and which concern minority groups." ABC Radio presenter Daniel Browning, who had been named in one of Bolt's articles, said that he had felt "humiliated" and "professionally undermined" by the articles, and suggested the restriction on freedom of expression could be justified.

In June 2013, trade unionist Paul Howes said in response to the case that he objected to the law for having "Orwellian" overtones and "I am concerned that people in some of the circles I mix, on my side of politics, increasingly seem to think that they should write, or invoke, or resurrect, laws that will shut Andrew Bolt up". The ABC's Jonathan Holmes of Media Watch described Justice Bromberg's interpretation of the RDA, and his application of it to Bolt's columns, as "profoundly disturbing" because it reinforced concerns that section 18C creates "one particular area of public life where speech is regulated by tests that simply don't apply anywhere else, and in which judges - never, for all their pontifications, friends of free speech - get to do the regulating".

In 2016, Labor Senator Kimberley Kitching, said she was "very surprised" when Justice Bromberg decided to hear the Bolt case, given that “He was an active ALP person, he was active enough that he was in a faction, he ran for preselection... Obviously he would have had some views about [Andrew Bolt], and perhaps he was not the best person to hear [the] case.” Bromberg had run unsuccessfully for Labor preselection in Melbourne in 2001.

== See also ==
- Indigenous identity fraud
- Pretendian
