= Michael Jarrett =

Michael Jarrett may refer to:

- Michael Jarrett (cricketer) (born 1972), English medical doctor and cricketer
- Michael Jarrett (archaeologist) (1934–1994), British archaeologist and gay rights activist
- Michael Jarrett (judge), judge of the Federal Circuit and Family Court of Australia
