= The Bolt Report =

Australian TV discussion series

- The Bolt Report logo used on News24
- Presented by: Andrew Bolt
- Country of origin: Australia
- Original language: English
- No. of seasons: 14

Production
- Production locations: Melbourne, Victoria
- Running time: 60 minutes
- Production companies: News Corp Australia (2011–15); News24 (2016–present)

Original release
- Network: Network Ten (2011–15); News24 (2016–present)
- Release: 8 May 2011 – present

The Bolt Report is an Australian political discussion program hosted by conservative commentator Andrew Bolt, who focuses on conservative political and social comment in the form of opinion commentary, panel discussion and interviews. The program highlights climate-change denial, immigration issues, Indigenous Australians, federal deficits and government borrowing, government corruption and free speech.

The program premiered on 8 May 2011 on Network Ten as a weekly Sunday morning political discussion show airing for thirty minutes at 10am AEST/AEDT. The Bolt Report continued in 2014, with an extended running time of one hour, until 2015.

In 2016, the program moved to News24, relaunching as a nightly primetime program, which debuted on 25 April 2016.

== Format ==
Former logo of The Bolt Report (2011–2015)

The program involves panel discussions, interviews and commentary.

The show also previously had individual segments including:

- "Spin of the Week" – a look at the best media spin of the week nominated by readers of his blog
- "Free Speech Award" – an award given to a high-profile personality who has made a controversial or criticised statement during the week. The inaugural award went to a former prime minister, Paul Keating, for his description of supporters of Lord Mayor of Sydney Clover Moore as "sandal-wearing, muesli-chewing, bike-riding pedestrians".
- "Poor Taste Award" – an award given to a high-profile personality for an offensive statement made during the week. The inaugural award went to Julia Gillard for describing Tony Abbott as the "love child of Sarah Palin and Donald Trump".

== News24 relaunch ==
The programme was put into hiatus in December 2015 with the last bulletin aired on 29 November 2015, reportedly over News Corp's unwillingness to continue paying production costs of $2 million. While the future of the program was initially deemed uncertain, Bolt became a contributor to News24 in February 2016, seemingly confirming the end of his association with Ten.

In March 2016 it was announced that The Bolt Report would resume on News24 in May 2016 airing in primetime on weeknights at 7pm. The News24 version will be produced in-house from the News24 Melbourne bureau, unlike the Ten version which was produced by News Corp Australia.

The program ultimately premiered on Sky News Live earlier than previously advised on 25 April 2016.

== Ratings ==
The program debuted with 163,000 while the encore received 123,000 viewers. The debut was narrowly beaten by Insiders, which received 172,000 viewers.Bolt stated on his blog he would like to beat Insiders on which he had appeared for 10 years. He reached this goal in his second episode, reaching 174,000 viewers, beating Insiders with 166,000.

In 2011, ratings for the show declined to 136,000 viewers for the third episode and 131,000 for the encore. This compared to 207,000 for Insiders. For the remainder of 2011, The Bolt Report remained at the bottom of the free-to-air ratings for its timeslot. This contrasted with The Bolt Report's 2012 ratings share which regularly exceeded that of Insiders. In July 2013 the number of viewers of the program was approximately 168,000. In November 2013 the program had an estimated 104,000 viewers.

The program grew its audience by 23 percent in 2015.

The first eleven episodes of The Bolt Report on News24 in 2016 averaged 23,254 national viewers, behind the averages of both Jones + Co (36,122) and Paul Murray Live (30,186). Bolt defended the average stating the figures were "out of date, because we're building, not sinking". Episodes on both 12 and 16 May 2016 for The Bolt Report averaged 42,000 viewers and outrated all other Sky News programs on those dates and peaked at 50,000 viewers on 20 May 2016. The Bolt Report was the most watched program on subscription television on 9 November 2016 as part of post-2016 American presidential election coverage with 139,000 viewers.

In the first half of 2018, The Bolt Report posted its highest ratings since moving to News24, and increasing viewership by 36% since the same period in 2017.

In 2019, the show continued to set record ratings for the program up +26% year-on-year and reaching 256,000 weekly.

In the first half of 2020, The Bolt Report was up +38% year-on-year, with a reach of 710,000 viewers.

By 2020, the show increased its average audience by +27%, reaching an average of 327,000 unique viewers each week.

== See also ==
- List of Australian television series
