= Australian Council for International Development =

The Australian Council For International Development (ACFID) is an independent national association of Australian non-government organisations (NGOs) working in the field of international aid and development. ACFID was founded in 1965, with Syd Einfeld as Chairman, and has over 130 members working in 90 developing countries and supported by over 1.5 million Australians. It lobbies for non-government aid organisations, and Australian government development aid.

ACFID was formerly known as ACFOA (The Australian Council For Overseas Aid). ACFID is based in Canberra, Australia.

The ACFID Code of Conduct is a voluntary, self-regulatory industry Code for international development organisations. Launched in 1998 by Governor General Sir William Deane, it represents a commitment by its signatories to high standards of integrity and accountability.

The ACFID Code of Conduct defines the standards of best practice for international development organisations in the fields of organisational integrity, governance, communication with the public, finances and personnel and management practices.

== Vision ==
To promote conditions of sustainable human development in which people are able to enjoy a full range of human rights, fulfill their needs free from poverty, and live in dignity.

== ACFID Members ==
The following organisations were listed as full ACFID members as of December 2012.

- 40K Foundation Australia
- ACC International Relief
- Act for Peace - NCCA
- ActionAid Australia
- ADRA Australia
- Afghan Australian Development Organisation
- Anglican Board of Mission - Australia
- Anglican Overseas Aid
- Archbishop of Sydney's Overseas Relief and Aid Fund
- Assisi Aid Projects
- Australasian Society for HIV Medicine
- Australian Cranio-Maxillo Facial Foundation
- Australia for UNHCR
- Access Aid International
- Australian Business Volunteers
- Australian Conservation Foundation
- Australian Doctors International
- Australian Doctors for Africa
- Australian Federation of AIDS Organisations
- Australian Foundation for the Peoples of Asia and the Pacific
- Australian Himalayan Foundation
- Australian Hope International Inc.
- Australian Injecting and Illicit Drug Users League*
- Australian Lutheran World Service
- Australian Marist Solidarity Ltd
- Australian Medical Aid Foundation
- Australian Respiratory Council
- Australian Volunteers International
- Baptist World Aid Australia
- Brien Holden Vision Institute Foundation
- Burnet Institute
- Business for Millennium Development
- CARE Australia
- Caritas Australia
- CBM Australia
- Charities Aid Foundation
- ChildFund Australia
- CLAN (Caring and Living as Neighbours)
- Cufa
- Daughters of Our Lady of the Sacred Heart Overseas Aid Fund*
- Door of Hope Australia Inc.
- Emergency Architects Australia
- Engineers without Borders
- Family Planning New South Wales
- Foresight (Overseas Aid and Prevention of Blindness)
- The Fred Hollows Foundation
- Friends of the Earth Australia
- Global Development Group
- GraceWorks Myanmar
- Habitat for Humanity Australia
- HealthServe Australia
- Hunger Project Australia
- International Detention Coalition*
- International Needs Australia
- International Nepal Fellowship (Aust) Ltd
- International River Foundation
- International Women's Development Agency
- Interplast Australia & New Zealand
- Islamic Relief Australia
- John Fawcett Foundation
- Kyeema Foundation
- Lasallian Foundation
- Leprosy Mission Australia
- Lifestyle Solutions (Aust) Ltd
- Live & Learn Environmental Education
- Mahboba's Promise Australia
- Marie Stopes International Australia
- Mercy Works Inc.
- Mission World Aid Inc.
- Motivation Australia
- Nusa Tenggara Association Inc.
- Oaktree
- Opportunity International Australia
- Oro Community Development Project Inc.
- Oxfam Australia
- Partners in Aid
- PLAN International Australia
- Project Vietnam
- Quaker Service Australia
- RedR Australia
- RESULTS International (Australia)
- Salesian Society Incorporated
- Salvation Army (NSW Property Trust)
- Save the Children Australia
- SeeBeyondBorders
- Sexual Health & Family Planning Australia
- SIMaid
- TEAR Australia
- Transparency International Australia
- Union Aid Abroad-APHEDA
- UnitingWorld
- University of Cape Town Australian Trust
- WaterAid Australia
- World Education Australia
- World Vision Australia
- WWF-Australia
