= Women in international law =

International Comprehensive Law

International law is a series of verbal agreements and written contracts between nations that govern how those nations interact with one another. "Public" international law includes human rights both in conflict situations and post-conflict reconstruction. The Convention on the Elimination of All Forms of Discrimination against Women (CEDAW) was adopted by the United Nations General Assembly in 1979 and has the goal of promoting women's rights. Women have contributed to work on post-conflict reconstruction, aid and ceasefire negotiations. They have also contributed to the Geneva II peace talks regarding Syria, and were involved in the Rohingya conflict in Myanmar as 'front-line responders'.

== International law mechanisms ==
The Convention on the Elimination of All Forms of Discrimination against Women (CEDAW) was adopted by the United Nations General Assembly on 18 December 1979, thirty years after the establishment of the United Nations Commission on the Status of Women. The goals of the convention were to promote women's rights and address systematic discrimination experienced by women. The rights covered in CEDAW includes women's political participation, education, health, employment, marriage and legal equality. CEDAW also advocates for a change in the traditional roles of men and women.

United Nations Security Council Resolution 1325, adopted on 31 October 2000, states the role women can play in conflict prevention and resolution, peace processes and post-conflict reconstruction. This resolution was the first time that the UN Security Council addressed the impact of armed conflict on women. UNSCR 1325 encourages all actors to increase the participation of women in these processes and to install mechanisms that will protect women and girls from violence on the basis of gender in conflict situations, such as rape and sexual abuse. Subsequent research undertaken since the adoption of UNSCR 1325 has addressed the involvement of women in peace and security, and is now consolidated under the "Women, Peace and Security Agenda." Additionally, evidence collected by UN Women illustrates the correlation between conflict prevention and gender equality. In 2016, the report found a 20% reduction in peace agreements containing gender-specific provisions, dropping from 70% to 50%.

== Prominent Women of International Law Award recipients ==
The American Society of International Law has a Women in International Law Interest Group (WILIG) "created to promote and enhance the careers of women in the field of international law. Every year, the WILIG Prominent Woman in International Law Award honors those who have advanced women, gender, and women's rights in international law.

Previous awardees:

- 2023: Gillian Triggs, UN Assistant Secretary-General and Assistant High Commissioner for Protection with UNHCR
- 2022: Fatou Bensouda, Former Prosecutor, International Criminal Court
- 2021: Gabrielle Kirk McDonald, American arbitrator on the Iran–United States Claims Tribunal seated in The Hague
- 2020: Judge Elizabeth Odio Benito, Inter-American Court of Human Rights
- 2019: Tracy Robinson, University of the West Indies Faculty of Law
- 2018: I. Maxine Marcus, Director, Partners in Justice International
- 2017: Judge Rosemary Barkett, Judge, Iran-United States Claims Tribunal
- 2016: Elizabeth Andersen, Executive Director, American Bar Association Rule of Law Initiative
- 2015: Anne-Marie Slaughter, President & CEO, New America Foundation
- 2014: Judge Joan Donoghue, International Court of Justice, Judge Julia Sebutinde, International Court of Justice, Judge Xue Hanqin, International Court of Justice
- 2013: Diane Marie Amann, University of Georgia School of Law
- 2012: Mireille Delmas-Marty, Chair of Comparative Legal Studies and Internationalization of Law at College de France
- 2011: Lucy Reed, Partner, Freshfields Bruckhaus Deringer; Former President, ASIL
- 2010: Dinah Shelton, Commissioner, Inter-American Commission on Human Rights; Professor, George Washington University Law School
- 2009: Unity Dow, Justice, High Court of Botswana
- 2008: Graciela Dixon, Chief Justice, Supreme Court of Panama
- 2007: Taghreed Hikmat, Judge, International Criminal Tribunal for Rwanda
- 2006: Rosalyn Higgins, President, International Court of Justice
- 2005: Regan Ralph, Executive Director, Fund for Global Human Rights, Kelly D. Askin, Senior Legal Officer for International Justice, Open Society Justice Initiative, Lea Browning, President, W.E.A.R.E. for Human Rights
- 2004: Cecelia Medina, Judge, Inter-American Court of Human Rights
- 2003: Hauwa Ibrahim, Hubert H. Humphrey Fellow, American University Washington College of Law; Defense Counsel to Nigerian defendant Amina Lawal, Sujata V. Manohar, Member, National Human Rights Commission of India; Former Judge, Supreme Court of India
- 2002: Patricia Wald, Former Judge, International Criminal Tribunal for the former Yugoslavia
- 2001: Marcia A. Wiss, Partner, Hogan & Hartson
- 2000: Ruth Lapidoth, Professor, Hebrew University Faculty of Law
- 1999: Patricia Viseur Sellers, Legal Advisor for Gender Related Crimes and Senior Acting Trial Attorney in the Office of the Prosecutor for the International Criminal Tribunals for the former Yugoslavia and Rwanda
- 1997: Lea Browning, Hogan & Hartson, Sujata V. Manoha, Director, International Centre for Ethnic Studies, Ricki Helfer, Chair, Federal Deposit Insurance Corporation, Sonia Picado, Ambassador of Costa Rica to the United States
- 1996: Patricia Schroeder, Member, U.S. House of Representatives, Geraldine A. Ferraro, U.S. Ambassador to the UN Human Rights Commission, Edith B. Weiss, President, American Society of International Law; and Professor, Georgetown University Law Center, Diane P. Wood, Judge, U.S. Court of Appeals, 7th Circuit
- 1995: Cynthia C. Lichtenstein, Professor, Boston College of Law, Laura Bocalandro, Inter-American Development Bank, Rita E. Hauser, President, The Hauser Foundation, Arvonne S. Fraser, U.S. Representative, UN Commission on the Status of Women
- 1994: Jamie S. Gorelick, General Counsel, U. S. Department of Defense, Rosalyn Higgins, Professor, London School of Economics, Madeleine E. Wall, Group Director, Legal Services Cable & Wireless PLC
- 1993: Charlene Barshefsky, Deputy U.S. Trade Representative, Carol F. Lee, General Counsel, Export-Import Bank of the United States, Elizabeth R. Rindskopf, General Counsel, Central Intelligence Agency

== Democratic Republic of the Congo: Violence against women ==
Some academic research surrounding gender inequality has included the Democratic Republic of the Congo (DRC) in their case studies. Women and girls have been found to be targets within DRC conflicts, including of crimes such as rape, forced prostitution and forced marriage. Up to six million people were killed in wars in the region lasting approximately two decades. Reasons for the conflict include the DRC's mineral wealth and natural resources. Crimes against civilians, predominantly women and girls, have not been subject to formal prosecution. These acts include gang rape (which accounts for a majority of cases), public rape, instrumental rape and female genital mutilation.

The UN Population Fund concluded that over 8,000 acts of sexual violence occurred in 2009 and 2010 in the DRC. By 2011, it was estimated that 1,152 women were raped every day, or 48 women per hour. In 2014, reported cases of rape in the DRC were increasing. Gender-based and sexual violence in the region persists due to high instability. Another reason is the high level of impunity that acts of sexual assault are met with, as the judicial system is under-resourced and the social status of women in the DRC remains low, whereby there exists a social stigma surrounding female rape victims. Additionally, displacement, insecurity and continuing conflict increase violence against women and girls, by members of their communities as well as armed groups.

In 2006, the Congolese government adopted a new law providing a legal framework to criminalise acts of sexual mutilation, sexual slavery, sexual relations with underage children, and the use of instruments in sexual violence. This has been designed to combat informal settlements between perpetrators and the families of victims, such as forced marriages between a victim and her rapist. The UN has since adopted the Comprehensive Strategy on Combating Sexual Violence in the DRC, focusing on combating impunity; preventing violence; reformation of the security sector; and assistance for survivors. Additionally, the UN Security Council has since adopted Resolutions 1856 (2008), 1888 (2009) and 1960 (2010) to condemn sexual violence in conflict situations, building on Resolution 1325 in its advocacy of women's involvement in peace processes and post-conflict reconstruction.

Within Congolese society there exists a stigma surrounding female rape victims, whereby they are ostracised from their families and communities. In 2017, the international campaign "16 Days of Activism" (established 1991) to end violence against women and girls, saw governments, activists, men, women and civil society collectively promote human rights. On November 25, 2017, UN agencies, media, civil society, government officials and students gathered in Kinshasa to launch the 2017 campaign theme "Leave No One Behind: End Violence Against Women and Girls." This included school competitions in which students answered questions about the texts and laws designed to protect women and girls from gender-based violence.

== Syria: Women's involvement in the peace talks ==
Due to the Syrian civil war, Syrian women and girls have been vulnerable to sexual and gender-based violence, marginalization and poverty. As a result, there have been approximately 500,000 deaths and an unprecedented number of refugees. While both women and men are subjected to gender-based violence, women and girls have statistically been the greater targets of these acts. Pre-existing gender inequalities put women and girls at a greater risk of violence, trafficking, forced marriage and exploitation. Some women participated in the Geneva II peace talks, although not formally. In 2012, UN Women reviewed 31 peace processes and found that 4% of peace agreements contained female signatories. A study undertaken by the Council on Foreign Relations in 2018 found that between 1990 and 2017, 19% of peace agreements contained references to women.

Women have predominantly been actors at the local level and not in formal peace negotiations, addressing the consequences of civil war by assisting internally displaced peoples and survivors of sexual violence, engaging in ‘cross-community dialogue’ and working in factories at their own personal risk. Women have led non-violent protests to release detainees, worked in field hospitals and schools, distributed aid and supplies, and "documented human rights violations."

On 6 January 2014, the Syrian Women's Charter was created in Damascus, advocating an end to violence and for Syrian unity to create a Syria that will better recognise and uphold the basic human rights of its nation. Syrian women have made active proposals for civil society participation and have worked together despite personal and political differences. Additionally, the Syrian Women's Political Movement was created and is aiming for a 30% quota of women participating in conflict resolution processes. The "It Takes a Woman" campaign was launched by UN Women in 2017 to raise awareness of Syrian women activists involved in both formal and informal peace processes, highlighting public debate over women's rights to participate in the ongoing peace processes.

== Myanmar: Rohingya women respond to the ongoing crisis ==
In Western Myanmar, the Rohingya population continues to be affected by mass killings, village destruction and gang rapes perpetrated by Myanmar's security forces. The attacks began in Myanmar's Rakhine State in August 2017, and the violence is ongoing. Since then, approximately 650,000 people have crossed into neighbouring Bangladesh, with tens of thousands displaced within the Rakhine state. Women and girls have been affected by issues such as mutilation, gang rape, forcible detention and being burned to death (Refugees International 2018). Exact statistics are unknown, due to difficulties in documentation of sexual violence. In a camp in Cox's Bazar, Bangladesh, up to 600,000 refugees live in crowded conditions, with girls as young as 11 reported to be forced into marriage by their families.

Statistics show that the representation of women in Myanmar's peace talks remains low. In the April 2016 peace talks, women accounted for 13% of the 700 delegates, the number increasing to 17% in May 2017. 4% of the 48-member peace committee were women. In the conflict zone, women operate as 'front-line responders', mostly taking care of other women in roles ranging from midwives to caseworkers, and providing information about services, safety, and human rights to the community. In October 2017, the Committee on the Elimination of Discrimination against Women (CEDAW) and the Committee on the Rights of the Child (CRC) called on Myanmar to stop the violence in the Rakhine State and to investigate cases of violence against women and children.
