= Section 18C of the Racial Discrimination Act 1975 =

Section of an Australian racial vilification law

Section 18C of the Racial Discrimination Act 1975, deals with offensive behaviour "because of race, colour or national or ethnic origin" in Australia. It is a section of the Racial Discrimination Act 1975, which was passed by the Australian Parliament during the term of the Whitlam government and makes racial discrimination unlawful in Australia. Section 18C was added by the Keating government in 1995. The Section has been controversial and subject to much debate.

== Contents ==
As of November 2016, Section 18C is worded as follows:

Offensive behaviour because of race, colour or national or ethnic origin

(1) It is unlawful for a person to do an act, otherwise than in private, if:

(a) the act is reasonably likely, in all the circumstances, to offend, insult, humiliate or intimidate another person or a group of people; and

(b) the act is done because of the race, colour or national or ethnic origin of the other person or of some or all of the people in the group.

Note: Subsection (1) makes certain acts unlawful. Section 46P of the Australian Human Rights Commission Act 1986 allows people to make complaints to the Australian Human Rights Commission about unlawful acts. However, an unlawful act is not necessarily a criminal offence. Section 26 says that this Act does not make it an offence to do an act that is unlawful because of this Part, unless Part IV expressly says that the act is an offence.

(2) For the purposes of subsection (1), an act is taken not to be done in private if it:

(a) causes words, sounds, images or writing to be communicated to the public; or

(b) is done in a public place; or

(c) is done in the sight or hearing of people who are in a public place.

(3) In this section:

"public place " includes any place to which the public have access as of right or by invitation, whether express or implied and whether or not a charge is made for admission to the place.

== Defences to 18C ==
Defences to 18C are found under 18D of the Racial Discrimination Act. Exemptions are made under Section 18D for:

- artistic works,
- academic, scientific or other purposes that are genuinely in the public interest,
- fair and accurate reporting, or
- fair comment that is an expression of genuine belief.

== The law in practice ==
Complaints under the Act can be lodged with Australia's Human Rights Commission, which is charged with investigating and either dismissing complaints, or initiating conciliation processes. If unresolved, matters can be taken to court. As of 2014, fewer than 5 per cent of complaints had gone to court, and a majority of those have been dismissed.

Section 18C does not create a criminal offence, but rather, under Section 46P of the Australian Human Rights Commission Act 1986 (Cth), people may take complaints to the Australian Human Rights Commission. If at that point, the complaint cannot be resolved, then an application alleging "unlawful discrimination" may be made to the Federal Court of Australia or to the Federal Circuit Court. When such allegations are upheld, the court may make orders, including for compensation.

== Case law examples ==
As of March 2014, some 15 cases had reached court and most of these had been dismissed. Complainants were mostly Aboriginal Australians, with Jewish people being the second largest group, though cases had also been brought by Caucasians.

- In Bryant v Queensland Newspaper Pty Ltd [1997] HREOCA 23, a complaint by an English person against use of the word Pom and Pommy in newspapers was dismissed.
- Rugema v Gadsten Pty Ltd & Derkes [1997] HREOCA 34 awarded $55,000 in damages to an African former refugee who had suffered racial abuse in the workplace.
- In Combined Housing Organisation Ltd, Ipswich Regional Atsic for Legal Services, Thompson and Fisher v Hanson [1997] HREOCA 58 a case was dismissed against politician Pauline Hanson over comments about Aboriginal welfare policy.
- In Mcglade v Lightfoot [1999] HREOCA 1, a complaint was lodged against Senator Ross Lightfoot over comments he had made that Aboriginal people were the most primitive people on earth and that aspects of their culture were abhorrent. His apology to the Senate was considered as part of the court's dismissal of the case.
- The tribunal upheld a complaint against a Councillor who made comments about "shooting" Aboriginal people in Jacobs v Fardig [1999] HREOCA 9.
- In Australian Macedonian Human Rights Committee (Inc) v State of Victoria [2000] HREOCA 52, the court found that the State of Victoria had acted unlawfully by instructing staff to "refer for the time being to the language that is spoken by people living in the Former Yugoslav Republic of Macedonia, or originating from it, as Macedonian (Slavonic)".
- In Jones v Toben [2000] HREOCA 39 the court found it was unlawful for the defendant to speak of the treatment of Jews in the 1930s and 1940s as having been "mythologised".
- In McMahon v Bowman [2000] FMCA 3 the court found against a man for calling his neighbour a "black bastard".
- In Wanjurri v Southern Cross Broadcasting (Aus) Ltd [2001] HREOCA 2, Southern Cross Broadcasting and journalist Howard Sattler were ordered to pay each of the five complainants $10,000 in damages.
- In Prior v Queensland University of Technology [2016], the Federal Circuit Court threw out a lawsuit which an Indigenous staff member at the Queensland University of Technology brought against some students for racist comments made on Facebook after one of them had been asked to leave a computer room in the university's Indigenous Higher Education Unit, an area set aside for Indigenous students and funded by the Commonwealth Government for the purpose of improving recruitment and retention of Indigenous students.

=== Eatock v Bolt ===
In Eatock v Bolt, Justice Mordecai Bromberg of the Federal Court found that two articles written by journalist Andrew Bolt and published in The Herald Sun newspaper had breached the Racial Discrimination Act. The case was controversial and instigated community debate about freedom of speech.

Justice Bromberg said in his reasons for the judgement that he had determined that some of the imputations in the two newspaper articles, were "reasonably likely to offend, insult, humiliate or intimidate" what he termed "fair-skinned Aboriginal people" (or some of them), and that the articles were written "because of the race, colour or ethnic origin of those people". He did not accept that 18D should provide a defence because he considered that the text contained "erroneous facts, distortions of the truth and inflammatory and provocative language". Bromberg also wrote "The intrusion into freedom of expression is of no greater magnitude than that which would have been imposed by the law of defamation if the conduct in question and its impact upon the reputations of many of the identified individuals had been tested against its compliance with that law".

A variety of journalists and commentators took issue with the Federal Court's decision on the grounds that it restricted free speech on a matter of public interest, but other journalists and commentators supported the case as an example of a legitimate restriction on freedom of expression. The political allegiance of the presiding judge to the Australian Labor Party was also raised as an issue (Justice Bromberg had once stood for Labor pre-selection). Bolt himself described the decision as a "terrible day for free speech" in Australia and said it represented "a restriction on the freedom of all Australians to discuss multiculturalism and how people identify themselves".

== Criticisms ==
Section 18C has been criticised for interfering with freedom of speech and political communication in Australia. Though a majority of cases are not made public, several known cases have proved controversial, with actions brought against individuals, politicians, journalists, comedians, cartoonists, university students, media organisations and governments.

Trade Unionist Paul Howes has argued that 18C stretches out its fingers "into the realm of what Orwell might have called a Thought Crime". In 1995, left-wing ABC journalist Phillip Adams argued against the provision, saying that a better response to expressions of racial hatred was "public debate, not legal censure".

While some conservative politicians have claimed the bar for breaching 18C is too low, courts have consistently shown that this is not the case, and to fall within 18C the speech must have "... profound and serious effects, not to be likened to mere slights".

The Abbott government expressed concerns that the wording of the legislation unreasonably limited freedom of speech. In March 2016, the Australian Law Reform Commission called for review of S 18C, stating "In particular, there are arguments that s18C lacks sufficient precision and clarity, and unjustifiably interferes with freedom of speech by extending to speech that is reasonably likely to 'offend'." The ALRC noted that it had received "widely divergent views" on whether s 18C should be amended but found as follows:

In the ALRC's view, s 18C of the RDA would benefit from more thorough review in relation to implications for freedom of speech. In particular, there are arguments that s 18C lacks sufficient precision and clarity, and unjustifiably interferes with freedom of speech by extending to speech that is reasonably likely to 'offend'. In some respects, the provision is broader than is required under international law, broader than similar laws in other jurisdictions, and may be susceptible to constitutional challenge.

— Traditional Rights and Freedoms—Encroachments by Commonwealth Laws (ALRC Report 129)

In November 2016, the President of the Human Rights Commission Gillian Triggs voiced support for changes to 18C, saying that removing the words "offend" and "insult" and inserting "vilify" would strengthen the laws.

== Attempts at reform ==
The Abbott government took a proposal to amend the Racial Discrimination Act to the 2013 Federal Election. The government argued that the Act unduly restricted free speech in Australia, by making "insult" and "offence" the test for breach of the law. Attorney-General George Brandis argued the case for amending the Keating government's controversial Section 18C of the Act. In March 2013, George Brandis released draft amendments for community consultation, and announced that the proposed changes would "strengthen the Act's protections against racism, while at the same time removing provisions which unreasonably limit freedom of speech." After community consultation, the Government was unable to secure support for changes to the Act from the Senate, and the Abbott government shelved the proposal. The draft amendments had met with criticism from the ALP, Liberal MP Ken Wyatt, and an alliance of racial minority representatives including Jewish lobby groups concerned with Holocaust denial in the media.

The question of amendment re-emerged during the term of the Turnbull government amid controversy over the pursuit of university students and cartoonist Bill Leak under 18C. The Government put the issue to Parliament's human rights committee to examine freedom of speech, including possible amendments to 18C, and changes to the Human Rights Commission's complaints-handling process. In 2016, the Australian Law Reform Commission and the President of the Human Rights Commission Gillian Triggs voiced support for changes to 18C.

On 30 March 2017, the Australian Senate voted down changes to 18C with 31 voting against (Labor, Greens, Lambie, Nick Xenophon Team) and 28 voting for (Coalition, Derryn Hinch, One Nation, and Liberal Democrat).

== Support for status quo ==
The Federally governing Labor Party opposes any changes to Section 18C.

=== Responses to Changing 18C ===
Party positions:

Position	Political parties	Ref
Oppose	Australian Labor Party	
Oppose	Australian Greens	
Support	Liberal/National Coalition	
Support	Pauline Hanson's One Nation	
