= Michael Jarrett (judge) =

Australian judge

Michael Jarrett is a Judge of the Federal Circuit and Family Court of Australia. He was previously a Judge of the Federal Circuit Court of Australia until its merger with the Family Court of Australia. Before then, he was a Federal Magistrate of the Federal Magistrates Court of Australia, before it was named the Federal Circuit Court of Australia. Jarrett has presided over a variety of cases, including family law, administrative law, bankruptcy, copyright, human rights, industrial law, and trade practices. Prior to being a judge, Jarrett was a barrister.

In 2016, Jarrett decided an action involving three Queensland University of Technology (QUT) students who were accused of racial vilification under Section 18C of the Racial Discrimination Act 1975 (Cth). One of the students was alleged to have breached Section 18C because of a Facebook post which read: "Just got kicked out of the unsigned Indigenous computer room. QUT stopping segregation with segregation." In November 2016, Jarrett held the claim had no reasonable prospects of success and threw out the lawsuit.
