= Australia for UNHCR =

Australian charity

- Established: 4 July 2000; Operating since 4 July 2000; 26 years ago
- Founder: Naomi Steer
- Services: Building support for the UN's Refugee Agency
- Website: www.unrefugees.org.au

Australia for UNHCR is an Australian charity that raises funds and support for the United Nations High Commissioner for Refugees, the UN's Refugee Agency. It was established on 4 July 2000.

== Fundraising ==
The organisation raises funds for international humanitarian programs supporting refugees and other displaced or stateless people, and undertakes activities to raise public awareness of the plight of refugees and other persons of concern to UNHCR.

From an income of $100,000 in the first year of fundraising, the organisation raised $6.6 million in 2008. The most recent Annual Information Statement reported to the Australian Charities and Not-for-profits Commission reports a total annual income of $41,510,916.

This has funded humanitarian work in Central America, the Philippines and throughout Africa.

== Special Representatives ==
High profile special representatives of Australia for UNHCR include Australian stage, film and theatre actor Marta Dusseldorp, actor and author Carina Hoang, cricketer Ian Chappell and comedian and actor Jane Turner.

== Patrons ==
The founding patron of Australia for UNHCR was former Nationals leader and deputy Prime Minister Tim Fischer, who was followed by former Governor General of Australia, Quentin Bryce. As of January 2025 the Patrons are Gillian Triggs and Michael Dwyer.

== Board ==
Members of the Board of Directors include former CEO of First State Super Michael Dwyer, Chief Technology Officer for The Iconic Zoe Ghani, former ABC News (Australia) executive Kate Dundas, Microsoft Australia executive Lynn Dang, Rick Millen and sports administrator John Boultbee (sport administrator).
