= Racial Discrimination Act 1975 =

Australian law

Parliament of Australia
- Long title: An Act relating to the Elimination of Racial and other Discrimination
- Citation: Racial Discrimination Act 1975
- Enacted by: House of Representatives
- Enacted: 11 June 1975
- Administered by: Australian Human Rights Commission
- Status: In force

The Racial Discrimination Act 1975 (Cth) is an Act of the Australian Parliament, which was enacted on 11 June 1975 and passed by the Whitlam government. The Act makes racial discrimination in certain contexts unlawful in Australia, and also overrides state and territory legislation to the extent of any inconsistency.

The Act is administered by the Australian Human Rights Commission (AHRC). The president of the commission is responsible for investigating complaints. If a complaint is validated, the commission will attempt to conciliate the matter. If the commission cannot negotiate an agreement which is acceptable to the complainant, the complainant's only redress is through the Federal Court of Australia or through the Federal Circuit and Family Court of Australia. The commission also attempts to raise awareness about the obligations that individuals and organisations have under the Act.

== The Act ==
=== Prohibition of racial discrimination in certain contexts ===
Racial discrimination occurs under the Act when someone is treated less fairly than someone else in a similar situation because of their race, colour, descent or national or ethnic origin. Racial discrimination can also occur when a policy or rule appears to treat everyone in the same way but actually has an unfair effect on more people of a particular race, colour, descent or national or ethnic origin than others.

It is against the law to discriminate in areas such as:

- Employment (section 15) - e.g. when seeking employment, training, promotion, equal pay or conditions of employment;
- Land, housing or accommodation (section 12) - e.g. when buying a house or when renting;
- Provision of goods and services (section 13) - e.g. when buying something, applying for credit, using banks, seeking assistance from government departments, lawyers, doctors and hospitals, or attending restaurants, pubs, entertainment venues;
- Access to places and facilities for use by the public (section 11) - e.g. when trying to use parks, libraries, government offices, hotels, places of worship, entertainment centres, hire cars;
- Advertising (section 16) - e.g. advertising for a job stating that people from a certain ethnic group cannot apply;
- Joining a trade union (section 14).

==== Cases ====
In Bligh and Ors v State of Queensland [1996] HREOCA 28, the Human Rights and Equal Opportunity Commission (precursor to the Australian Human Rights Commission) found in favour of a number of Aboriginal applicants who had worked on Great Palm Island Aboriginal reserve and were underpaid between 31 October 1975 (the Act's start date) and 31 May 1984. A$7,000 was awarded to each applicant, although the evidence suggested that the loss of income A$8,573.66 to A$20,982.97. Following this case, the Queensland Government settled 5,729 claims with a single payment of A$7,000 under the Award Wages Process, established in May 1999, to Indigenous people employed by the government on Aboriginal reserves between 1975 and 1986 (the date their policy of paying below-award rates to Indigenous Australians officially ended).

In Wotton v Queensland (No 5) police raids and behaviour following the 2004 Palm Island community riot, sparked by the death in custody of an Aboriginal man, were found to have breached the Racial Discrimination Act with $220,000 in damages awarded in 2016. Police actions were described in the judgement as "unnecessary, disproportionate" with police having "acted in these ways because they were dealing with an Aboriginal community." Dozens of police officers in riot gear wearing balaclavas with no identification and carrying large guns had marched into the community conducting early-morning raids on 27 November 2004. Residents reported officers kicking down doors, pointing guns at children's heads, and tasering residents. with one resident and his partner awarded $235,000 compensation for assault, battery and false imprisonment in a separate case. Subsequently, this led to a record class action settlement of $30 million and a formal apology issued by the Queensland State Government in May 2018.

=== Section 18C ===
Section 18C of the Act makes it is unlawful for a person to do an act in public if it is reasonably likely to "offend, insult, humiliate or intimidate" a person of a certain race, colour or national or ethnic origin, and the act was done because of one or more of those characteristics.

While some conservative politicians have claimed the bar for breaching 18C is too low, courts have consistently shown that this is not the case, and to fall within 18C the speech must have "... profound and serious effects, not to be likened to mere slights."

Exemptions are provided in section 18D, including acts relating to artistic works, genuine academic or scientific purposes, fair reporting, and fair comment on matters of public interest.

Cases and determinations in relation to section 18C include the following:

- In Bryant v Queensland Newspaper Pty Ltd [1997] HREOCA 23, the predecessor of the AHRC, the Human Rights and Equal Opportunity Commission (HREOC) dismissed a complaint by an English person against use of the words "Pom" and "Pommy" used in newspapers.
- Rugema v Gadsten Pty Ltd & Derkes [1997] HREOCA 34, the HREOC awarded $55,000 in damages to an African former refugee who had suffered racial abuse in the workplace.
- In Combined Housing Organisation Ltd, Ipswich Regional Atsic for Legal Services, Thompson and Fisher v Hanson [1997] HREOCA 58, the HREOC dismissed a complaint against politician Pauline Hanson over comments about Aboriginal welfare policy.
- In Mcglade v Lightfoot [1999] HREOCA 1, the HREOC dismissed a complaint against Senator Ross Lightfoot over comments he had made that Aboriginal people were the most primitive people on earth and that aspects of their culture were abhorrent, on the basis that he had apologised in the Senate and retracted his comments.
- In Jacobs v Fardig [1999] HREOCA 9, the HREOC found that a Councillor who had made comments about "shooting" Aboriginal people contravened section 18C.
- In Jones v Toben [2000] HREOCA 39 the HREOC found that a person had contravened section 18C when they referred to the treatment of Jews in the 1930s and 1940s as having been "mythologised". Following orders made by the Federal Court of Australia to enforce the commission's decision, in Toben v Jones [2003] FCAFC 137 the Full Court of the Federal Court of Australia dismissed an appeal from those orders, in which the defendant challenged the constitutional validity of section 18C.
- In McMahon v Bowman [2000] FMCA 3, the Federal Magistrates Court of Australia found that a person had contravened section 18C by calling his neighbour a "black bastard".
- In Wanjurri v Southern Cross Broadcasting (Aus) Ltd [2001] HREOCA 2, the HREOC found that Southern Cross Broadcasting and journalist Howard Sattler had contravened section 18C, and ordered each to pay the five complainants $10,000 in damages.
- In Eatock v Bolt [2011] FCA 1103, the Federal Court of Australia held that newspaper commentator Andrew Bolt had contravened section 18C for comments made in relation to fair-skinned Aboriginal persons.
- In Prior v Queensland University of Technology & Others [2016] FCCA 2853, the Federal Circuit Court of Australia summarily dismissed a claim brought by an indigenous staff member at the Queensland University Technology against certain students for comments made on Facebook after one of them had been evicted from a computer room set aside for indigenous students, on the basis that the claim had no reasonable prospects of success.

=== Complaint process and remedies ===
An aggrieved person may make a complaint of a contravention of the Act to the Australian Human Rights Commission. If the complaint cannot be resolved, then an application alleging "unlawful discrimination" may be made to the Federal Court of Australia or to the Federal Circuit Court. When such allegations are upheld, the court may make orders, including for compensation.

== Analysis ==
=== Constitutionality ===
The source of the federal parliament's power to pass the Act is the external affairs power contained in section 51(xxix) of the Australian Constitution. Under that power, the federal parliament implemented international obligations arising under the 1965 International Convention on the Elimination of All Forms of Racial Discrimination, which Australia ratified in September 1975. The High Court of Australia confirmed that the external affairs power was a valid source of power for the Act in Koowarta v. Bjelke-Petersen (1982), and again in Mabo v Queensland (No 1) (1988).

While the AHRC maintains that the Act provides an appropriate balance between freedom of speech and freedom from racial vilification, legal academics Forrester, Finlay and Zimmermann have suggested that section 18C of the Act, enacted in 1995, may be unconstitutional on the basis that it is inconsistent with the constitutional implied freedom of political communication.

=== Law reform proposals ===
Section 18C of the Act has been a topic of debate, especially in recent years. While some conservative politicians have claimed the bar for breaching 18C is too low, courts have consistently shown that this is not the case, and to fall within 18C the speech must have "... profound and serious effects, not to be likened to mere slights."

In 1995, left-wing ABC journalist Phillip Adams argued against the provision, saying that a better response to expressions of racial hatred was "public debate, not legal censure".

In 2011, the Federal Court ruled that commentator Andrew Bolt had contravened section 18C of the Act as he could not rely on the exemptions under Section 18D. Bolt said that the verdict was "a restriction on the freedom of all Australians to discuss multiculturalism and how people identify themselves".

The political allegiance of the presiding judge to the Australian Labor Party has also been raised as an issue (Justice Bromberg had once stood for Labor pre-selection).

In 2013, members of the Abbott government proposed significant changes to section 18C in a draft bill put on public exhibition, which would have substantially limited the scope of the prohibition. The Attorney-General, George Brandis, defended the proposed changes, stating that people have "a right to be bigots". Trade Unionist Paul Howes argued that section 18C stretches out its fingers "into the realm of what Orwell might have called a Thought Crime". After public consultation and opposition by minority groups, the Government did not proceed with the proposed changes.

More recently, members of the Turnbull government have proposed less significant and narrower changes to section 18C, and the Attorney-General, George Brandis, has asked for the Joint Parliamentary Committee on Human Rights to conduct an inquiry on the appropriateness of section in its current form. In March 2016, the Australian Law Reform Commission called for review of section 18C, stating “In particular, there are arguments that s18C lacks sufficient precision and clarity, and unjustifiably interferes with freedom of speech by extending to speech that is reasonably likely to ‘offend’." The ALRC noted that it had received "widely divergent views" on whether s 18C should be amended but found as follows:

"In the ALRC’s view, s 18C of the Act would benefit from more thorough review in relation to implications for freedom of speech. In particular, there are arguments that s 18C lacks sufficient precision and clarity, and unjustifiably interferes with freedom of speech by extending to speech that is reasonably likely to ‘offend’. In some respects, the provision is broader than is required under international law, broader than similar laws in other jurisdictions, and may be susceptible to constitutional challenge." In 2016, Labor Senator Kimberley Kitching, said she was "very surprised" when Justice Bromberg decided to hear the Bolt case given, “He was an active ALP person, he was active enough that he was in a faction, he ran for preselection... Obviously he would have had some views about [Andrew Bolt], and perhaps he was not the best person to hear [the] case.” Bromberg had run unsuccessfully for Labor preselection in Melbourne in 2001.

In November, 2016, the President of the Human Rights Commission Gillian Triggs voiced support for changes to 18C, saying that removing the words "offend" and "insult" and inserting "vilify" would strengthen the laws.

On March 30, 2017, the Australian Senate voted down changes to 18C with 31 votes; Labor, Greens, Lambie, Xenophon voting against and 28 votes Liberal, Derryn Hinch, One Nation, and Liberal Democrat for.

== See also ==
- Hate speech laws in Australia
- List of anti-discrimination acts
- Racism in Australia
- Human rights in Australia
