= Andrew Bolt =

Australian columnist

- Born: 26 September 1959 (age 67); Adelaide, Australia
- Occupations: Columnist; TV host; radio host
- Years active: 1993–present
- Employers: Herald Sun; Sky News Australia
- Television: The Bolt Report
- Spouse: Sally Morrell (m. 1989)
- Website: heraldsun.com.au/andrewbolt

Andrew Bolt (born 26 September 1959) is an Australian conservative social and political commentator. He has worked at the News Corp-owned newspaper company The Herald and Weekly Times (HWT) for many years, for both The Herald and its successor, the Herald Sun. His current roles include blogger and columnist at the Herald Sun and host of television show The Bolt Report each weeknight. In Australia, Bolt is a controversial public figure, who has frequently been accused of abrasive demeanour, racist views and inappropriate remarks on various political and social issues.

== Background ==
Bolt was born in Adelaide, his parents being newly-arrived Dutch immigrants. He spent his childhood in remote rural areas, including Tarcoola, South Australia, while his father worked as a school teacher and principal. After completing secondary school at Murray Bridge High School, Bolt travelled and worked overseas before returning to Australia and beginning an arts degree at the University of Adelaide. Dropping out of university he took up a cadetship with The Age, a Melbourne broadsheet newspaper. His roles at The Age included sports writer, prior to joining The Herald. His time as a reporter included a period as the newspaper's Asia correspondent, based first in Hong Kong and later in Bangkok. He worked for the Hawke government on two election campaigns.

== Media career ==
Bolt has had various roles on numerous TV networks, radio stations and in the print media.

In 2005, Bolt released a compilation of newspaper columns in a book entitled Still Not Sorry: The Best of Andrew Bolt.

=== Print ===
Bolt's column and articles are published by News Corp Australia in the Herald Sun and his column is published in The Daily Telegraph, The Advertiser in Adelaide, Northern Territory News and The Courier-Mail.

=== Internet ===
In May 2005, Bolt established a web-only forum in which readers could offer comments, feedback and questions in response to his columns. He posted some of these comments on the Herald Sun website. The forum changed to a more conventional blog format in July 2006.

=== Radio ===
Bolt co-hosted a daily radio show, Breakfast with Steve Price and Andrew Bolt, on the former MTR 1377.

He appeared weekly on radio station 2GB in Sydney for The Clash with union leader Paul Howes and as of 2016 is a regular guest four nights a week on Nights with Steve Price, which is broadcast on 2GB and Melbourne's 3AW, 4BC Brisbane and network stations across Australia.

=== Television ===
From 2001 to 2011, he was a regular guest on Insiders.

Bolt left Insiders in May 2011 to host his own weekly program, The Bolt Report, on Network Ten. The Bolt Report ended on Ten in 2015 and, in 2016, Bolt became a contributor to Sky News Live. The Bolt Report subsequently resumed on Sky News Live in May 2016 as a nightly format.

He has also appeared on the ABC television show Q&A and ABC Radio National's Late Night Live with Phillip Adams.

== Controversies, court actions and findings ==
=== Leak of intelligence document ===
In June 2003, Bolt published an article criticising Andrew Wilkie in which he quoted from a classified intelligence document written by Wilkie as an intelligence analyst for the Office of National Assessments. It was claimed, but never proven, that someone in Foreign Minister Alexander Downer's office had leaked the document to Bolt. A spokesperson for the Australian Federal Police said that they did not have any evidence to identify the culprit.

=== Stolen Generations ===
Bolt has questioned the existence of the Stolen Generation. Bolt stated that it is a "preposterous and obscene" myth and that there was actually no policy in any state or territory at any time for the systematic removal of "half-caste" Aboriginal children. Robert Manne responded that Bolt did not address the documentary evidence demonstrating the existence of the Stolen Generations and that this is a clear case of historical denialism. Bolt then challenged Manne to produce ten cases in which the evidence justified the claim that children were "stolen" as opposed to having been removed for reasons such as neglect, abuse, abandonment, etc. He argued that Manne did not respond and that this was an indication of unreliability of the claim that there was policy of systematic removal. In reply, Manne stated that he supplied a documented list of 250 names. Bolt stated that, prior to a debate, Manne provided him with a list of 12 names that he was able to show during the debate was "a list of people abandoned, saved from abuse or voluntarily given up by their parents"; and that during the actual debate, Manne produced a list of 250 names without any details or documentation as to their circumstances. Bolt also stated that he was subsequently able to identify and ascertain the history of some of those on the list and was unable to find a case where there was evidence to justify the term "stolen". He stated that one of the names on the list of allegedly stolen children was 13-year-old Dolly, taken into state care after being "found seven months pregnant and penniless, working for nothing on a station".

The Bolt/Manne debate is an example of the adversarial arguments on the issue. There is focus on individual examples as evidence for or against the existence of a policy, and little or no analysis of other documentary evidence such as legislative databases showing how the legal basis for removal varied over time and between jurisdictions, or testimony from those who were called on to implement the policies, which was also recorded in the Bringing Them Home report. A 2008 review of legal cases claims it is difficult for Stolen Generation claimants to challenge what was written about their situation at the time of removal.

=== Defamation case ===
In 2002, magistrate Jelena Popovic was awarded $246,000 damages for defamation after suing Bolt and the publishers of the Herald Sun over a 13 December 2000 column in which he claimed that she had "hugged two drug traffickers she let walk free". Popovic stated that she had in fact shaken their hands to congratulate them on having completed a rehabilitation program. The jury found that what Bolt wrote was untrue, unfair and inaccurate, but cleared him of malice.

Bolt emerged from the Supreme Court of Victoria after the jury verdict, stating that his column had been accurate and that the mixed verdict was a victory for free speech. His statement outside the court was harshly criticised by Supreme Court Justice Bernard Bongiorno, who later overturned the jury's decision, ruling that Bolt had not acted reasonably because he did not seek a response from Popovic before writing the article and, in evidence given during the trial, showed he did not care whether or not the article was defamatory. Justice Bongiorno ordered that Popovic be awarded $210,000 in aggravated compensatory damages, $25,000 in punitive damages and $11,500 interest. The judge stated that the damages awarded were significantly influenced by Bolt's "disingenuous" comments he had made outside court and the Herald Sun's reporting of the jury's decision. The Court of Appeal later reversed the $25,000 punitive damages, though it upheld the defamation finding, describing Bolt's conduct as "at worst, dishonest and misleading and at best, grossly careless".

=== Racial discrimination case ===
In September 2010, nine individuals commenced legal proceedings in the Federal Court against Bolt and the Herald Sun over two posts on Bolt's blog. The nine sued over posts titled "It's so hip to be black", "White is the New Black" and "White Fellas in the Black". The articles suggested it was fashionable for "fair-skinned people" of diverse ancestry to choose Aboriginal racial identity for the purposes of political and career clout. The applicants claimed the posts breached the Racial Discrimination Act 1975. They sought an apology, legal costs, and a gag on republishing the articles and blogs, and "other relief as the court deems fit". They did not seek damages. On 28 September 2011, Justice Mordecai Bromberg found Bolt to have contravened section 18C of the Racial Discrimination Act.

The case was controversial. Bolt described the decision as a "terrible day for free speech" in Australia and said it represented "a restriction on the freedom of all Australians to discuss multiculturalism and how people identify themselves. I argued then and I argue now that we should not insist on the differences between us but focus instead on what unites us as human beings." Jonathan Holmes of the ABC's Media Watch described Justice Bromberg's interpretation of the Racial Discrimination Act, and his application of it to Bolt's columns as "profoundly disturbing" because it reinforced concerns that 18C creates "one particular area of public life where speech is regulated by tests that simply don't apply anywhere else, and in which judges - never, for all their pontifications, friends of free speech - get to do the regulating." Bolt later commented that he believed Justice Bromberg's failed attempt to run for the Labor Party ten years prior had a role in the final decision.

=== Assault ===
On 6 June 2017, Bolt was assaulted in Lygon Street, Melbourne by two masked men, while a third apparently filmed the attack. Melbourne Antifa, a self described "anti-fascism" activist group, appeared to claim a connection in the incident on Facebook, posting that Bolt attacked "some of our family in solidarity ... while they were protesting today". Video footage of the assault on Bolt was described as 'alarming', with Bolt saying he was "sick of being targeted for his conservative beliefs and would pursue his attackers for justice and demand a charitable donation".

=== Immigration ===
Bolt has spoken out against the changing racial demographics of Australia. In August 2018, Bolt wrote an article titled "Tidal wave of new tribes dividing us" in which he argues that a "tidal wave" of migrants are swamping Australia, forming enclaves and "changing our culture". He also said "Immigration is becoming colonisation, turning this country from a home into a hotel." This article prompted a press council complaint. Bolt has also written approvingly of Jean Raspail's book The Camp of the Saints, a novel depicting Europe being swamped by Asian immigrants, calling it "prophetic and brave" and "a brilliantly prophetic novel."

=== Defence of George Pell ===
In 2019, Bolt defended Cardinal George Pell, who at that time had been convicted of child sexual abuse (he was later acquitted by the High Court), saying that "I am not a Catholic or even a Christian. He is a scapegoat, not a child abuser." He also stated that "In my opinion, this is our own OJ Simpson case, but in reverse. A man was found guilty not on the facts but on prejudice. ... Cardinal George Pell has been falsely convicted of sexually abusing two boys in their early teens. That's my opinion, based on the evidence." He went on to say that the successful prosecutions case was "flimsy" and that the conviction was the result of a "vicious" smear that formed part of a "sinister" campaign against the cardinal, adding that Pell was being made to "pay for the sins made by his church". Bolt reiterated his support for Pell when the appeal against Pell's conviction was dismissed in Victoria's Court of Appeal. On 7 April 2020, the High Court of Australia quashed Pell's convictions and determined that verdicts of acquittal be entered in place of all previous verdicts.

On 14 April 2020, Bolt interviewed George Pell on Sky News Australia following his acquittal by the High Court. During the interview, Bolt asked Pell if he felt ashamed of the way the Catholic church dealt with the ongoing sex abuse crisis. Pell replied that he did and described the crisis as a "cancer", also stating that failures for the church to act still haunted him. Pell said he didn't commit the alleged Melbourne sex abuse and didn't know why the accuser testified against him. He suggested the accuser may have been 'used'.

=== Comments regarding Greta Thunberg ===
In July 2019, Bolt made comments about Swedish climate activist Greta Thunberg in which he questioned the legitimacy of her views on climate breakdown due to Thunberg's autism. "I have never seen a girl so young and with so many mental disorders treated by so many adults as a guru", wrote Bolt. He went on to question why such leaders "treat a young and strange girl with such awe and even rapture". The comments were widely seen as ignorant. Later in the article, Bolt went on to describe Thunberg's younger sister as displaying "a spectacular range of mental issues". Thunberg responded to the article on Twitter, saying "I am indeed 'deeply disturbed' about the fact that these hate and conspiracy campaigns are allowed to go on and on and on just because we children communicate and act on the science. Where are the adults?"

=== Comments regarding Bruce Pascoe ===
Author Bruce Pascoe grew up thinking his ancestry was British. In his 30s he came to believe that he also has Australian Aboriginal heritage and identified himself as Koori. Bolt objected to this apparent change in Pascoe's heritage following the success of Dark Emu, a book written by Pascoe in 2014 that reexamines colonial accounts of Aboriginal people in Australia, and cites evidence of pre-colonial agriculture, engineering and building construction by Aboriginal and Torres Strait Islander people. Bolt suggested on his blog that Pascoe had succumbed to "the romance of the Noble Savage… the thrill of the superstitious".

In an earlier article in the Griffith Review (2012, following Eatock v Bolt) titled "Andrew Bolt's Disappointment" (also reproduced in Salt: Selected Stories and Essays), Pascoe had suggested that he and Bolt could "have a yarn" together, without rancour, because "I think it's reasonable for Australia to know if people of pale skin identifying as Aborigines are fair dinkum". He described how and why his Aboriginal ancestry – and that of many others – had allegedly been buried.

In early 2020, the feud escalated when Bolt published a letter provided to him by Josephine Cashman, which resulted in Cashman being dismissed from the Federal Government's Indigenous voice to government's Senior Advisory Group. In the blog post, Bolt said the letter had been written by a Yolngu elder, denouncing Pascoe and Dark Emu. However the elder asserted that he had not written the letter, and it was also found to have paragraphs lifted from other sources.

=== Child sexual grooming comments ===
Bolt was widely condemned by child protection advocates who stated that he had minimised the seriousness of child sexual grooming during a segment on his Sky News show on 18 February 2020. Bolt repeatedly used the phrase "hit on" to describe the sexual grooming of a Year 9 school boy by his athletics coach at St Kevin's College, Melbourne. Child welfare advocate Katrina Lines said "There is no consensual social situation in which it would be OK for an adult to 'hit on' a child. The adult was grooming the child and building an emotional connection so they could do what they wanted to him". The abused school boy later stated that Bolt and Gerard Henderson's comments made him feel "sick" and accused the pair of "trivialising" the assaults. Bolt and Henderson apologised for their comments in the subsequent days.

=== Climate change ===
In 2021, Bolt opposed the News Corp campaign to publicise the effects of climate change as 'rubbish'. Australian Conservation Foundation chief executive, Kelly O'Shanassy, commented that Bolt has "no credibility" on climate change.

== Books by Bolt ==
- Bolt: Still Not Sorry, Melbourne: Wilkinson Publishing, 2016.
- Bolt: Worth Fighting For: Insights & Reflections, Melbourne: Wilkinson Publishing, 2016.

== Personal life ==
Bolt is married to Sally Morrell, a fellow columnist at the Herald Sun. They have been married since 1989 and have three children. Bolt is an agnostic.
