= Paul Howes =

Australian trade unionist

National Secretary of the Australian Workers' Union
- In office 24 November 2007 – 2014
- Preceded by: Bill Shorten
- Succeeded by: Scott McDine

Personal details
- Born: 23 August 1981 (age 45) Sydney, New South Wales, Australia
- Party: Democratic Socialist Perspective (1993–1996); Australian Labor Party (1996–present)
- Occupation: Union official

Paul Howes (born 23 August 1981) is an Australian trade unionist. He was involved in the Australian trade union movement from 1999 through 2014. His most recent position was as National Secretary of the Australian Workers' Union, the youngest person to serve in that position. In 2008, Howes was elected as vice president of the Australian Council of Trade Unions, and he served on a number of Government boards.

Howes resigned from his position as AWU National Secretary on 24 March 2014; he formally stepped down in July.

== Background and early career ==
Howes entered politics while still at Blaxland High School in the Blue Mountains of New South Wales, joining the far-left political groups Democratic Socialist Party. He did not finish high school, leaving in Year 9.

By the age of 16, after a solidarity trip to Cuba to the World Festival of Youth and Students, Howes abandoned far-left politics and joined the Australian Labor Party. In an interview with the newspaper The Age Howes stated: "A beautiful country with beautiful people, but I didn't like seeing people getting arrested or the clear and transparent oppression and propaganda, and I eventually thought, 'This is all bonkers'".

Howes has three children from his first marriage. He is married to Qantas executive Olivia Wirth.

== Trade union career ==
Howes became a union official at the age of 17 when he was employed as a research officer by the Labor Council of New South Wales (now Unions New South Wales). He joined the Australian Workers' Union as an official in New South Wales in 2002 and was later recruited to the National Office of the union. In 2005 he was elected as the union's National Vice President, becoming the youngest national official in the history of the union. He was elected National Secretary of the Australian Workers' Union following the election of former AWU National Secretary Bill Shorten to the Australian House of Representatives in November 2007.

Howes was also Deputy Chair of AustralianSuper, one of the largest superannuation trusts in Australia. He was also a member of the National Executive of the Australian Labor Party. He was a director of the Chifley Research Centre and the McKell Institute as well as representing the Asia Pacific Region on the executive committee of the IndustriALL Global Union.

Howes came to national attention as a union spokesperson for the miners during the Beaconsfield Mine Disaster.

In December 2008, Howes was elected vice president of the Australian Council of Trade Unions. In February 2009 and February 2013, he was re-elected unopposed as the National Secretary of The Australian Workers' Union. An episode of ABC program Australian Story, broadcast August 2010, highlighted his influence within Labor, especially leading up to the 2010 Australian federal election.

In November 2010 Howes wrote Confessions of a Faceless Man: inside campaign 2010, an autobiographical analyses of the election and 18 months in Australian politics. He also gave a speech to the Sydney Institute, which The Australian published as an opinion piece headed: "ALP's faceless men must learn to tolerate dissent."

In 2013, Howes was considered for an appointment to the Australian Senate, but subsequently withdrew his nomination in September, while announcing his intention to continue to serve as the national secretary of the Australian Workers Union. In explaining his reasons for stepping down, Howes stated that his public support for gay marriage had drawn the ire of pro-Catholic right-wing members of the ALP. Speaking to reporters, Howes stated that "I don't want to be a wrecker and I don't want to divide. It is clear if I was to be a candidate for this position it would be a divisive, negative and destructive fight in the New South Wales branch of the Australian Labor Party".

In a speech in February 2014, Howes provoked controversy by arguing that the biggest problem with industrial relations in Australia is the constant changes in the regulatory framework. He called for a new partnership between business, government and unions to collaborate and agree to a framework which could provide a stable industrial relations environment. Howes declared agreement with the Abbott government saying there had been "unsustainable growth in wages" in some sectors of the economy.

== Published works ==
- Howes, Paul (2010). Confessions of a Faceless Man: inside campaign 2010 (1st ed.). Melbourne University Press. ISBN 978-0-522-85833-4.

Trade union offices
Preceded by Bill Shorten	National Secretary of the Australian Workers' Union; 2007–2014	Succeeded by Scott McDine
