= Australian Aboriginal identity =

Perception of oneself as Aboriginal Australian

Aboriginal Australian identity, sometimes known as Aboriginality, is the perception of oneself as Aboriginal Australian, or the recognition by others of that identity. Aboriginal Australians are one of two Indigenous Australian groups of peoples, the other being Torres Strait Islanders. There has also been discussion about the use of "Indigenous" vs "Aboriginal", or more specific group names (which are many and based on varied criteria), such as Murri or Noongar (demonyms), Kaurna or Yolngu (and subgroups), based on language, or a clan name. Usually preference of the person(s) in question is used, if known.

The term "Aboriginal" was coined by white settlers in Australia in the 1830s, after they began to adopt the term "Australian" to define themselves. No real attempt to define the term legally was made until the 1980s, despite use of the term twice in the 1901 Constitution of Australia, before these were removed following the 1967 referendum. Various legal and administrative definitions have been used over the years. A leading judgment by Justice Brennan in the 1992 Mabo v Queensland (No 2) case (which relates to Indigenous of the Torres Strait exclusively) stated that an Indigenous identity of a person depends on a three-part test: biological descent from the Indigenous people; recognition of the person's membership by that person; and recognition by the elders or other persons enjoying traditional authority among those people. This is still in use today.

Various factors affect Aboriginal people's self-identification as Aboriginal, including a growing pride in culture, solidarity in a shared history of dispossession (including the Stolen Generations), and, among those are fair-skinned, an increased willingness to acknowledge their ancestors, once considered shameful. Aboriginal identity can be politically controversial in contemporary discourse, among both Aboriginal and non-Aboriginal people. Successive censuses have shown those identifying as Indigenous (Aboriginal and/or Torres Strait Islander) at a rate far exceeding the growth of the whole Australian population.

== History ==
A legal historian estimated in 1991 that at least 67 classifications, descriptions or definitions to determine who is an Aboriginal person had been used by governments since white settlement in Australia.

=== 1788 – 1980 ===
The term "Aborigine" was coined by white settlers in Australia in the 1830s from ab origine, a Latin phrase meaning "from the very beginning".

Until the 1980s, the sole legal and administrative criterion for inclusion in this category was race, classified according to visible physical characteristics or known ancestors. This was similar to the legal doctrine of partus sequitur ventrum in the American South which had been present from 1662 onward during the colonial era and mandated that a child's status was determined by that of their mothers: if born to Aboriginal mothers, children were considered Aboriginal, regardless of their paternity.

In the era of colonial and post-colonial government, access to basic human rights depended upon your race. If you were a "full-blooded Aboriginal native ... [or] any person apparently having an admixture of Aboriginal blood", a half-caste being the "offspring of an Aboriginal mother and other than Aboriginal father" (but not of an Aboriginal father and other than Aboriginal mother), a "quadroon", or had a "strain" of Aboriginal blood you were forced to live on Reserves or Missions, work for rations, given minimal education, and needed governmental approval to marry, visit relatives or use electrical appliances.

The Constitution of Australia, in its original form as of 1901, referred to Aboriginal people twice, but without definition. Section 51(xxvi) gave the Commonwealth parliament a power to legislate with respect to "the people of any race" throughout the Commonwealth, except for people of "the aboriginal race". The purpose of this provision was to give the Commonwealth power to regulate non-white immigrant workers, who would follow work opportunities interstate. The only other reference, Section 127, provided that "aboriginal natives shall not be counted" in reckoning the size of the population of the Commonwealth or any part of it. The purpose of Section 127 was to prevent the inclusion of Aboriginal people in Section 24 determinations of the distribution of House of Representatives seats amongst the states and territories.

The New Deal for Aborigines, announced by the federal government in 1938, divided Aboriginal people into four categories – myalls ("aboriginals in their native state"), semi-detribalised, fully detribalised, and half-caste (mixed race).

Explicit references to Aboriginal people in the constitution were removed by the 1967 referendum. (These amendments altered Section 51(xxvi), and Section 127, having the immediate effect of including Aboriginal people in determinations of population, and also empowering the Federal Parliament to legislate specifically for this racial group.) Since that time, there have been a number of proposals to amend the constitution to specifically mention Indigenous Australians.

=== 1980s: Commonwealth Definition, rise and respect ===
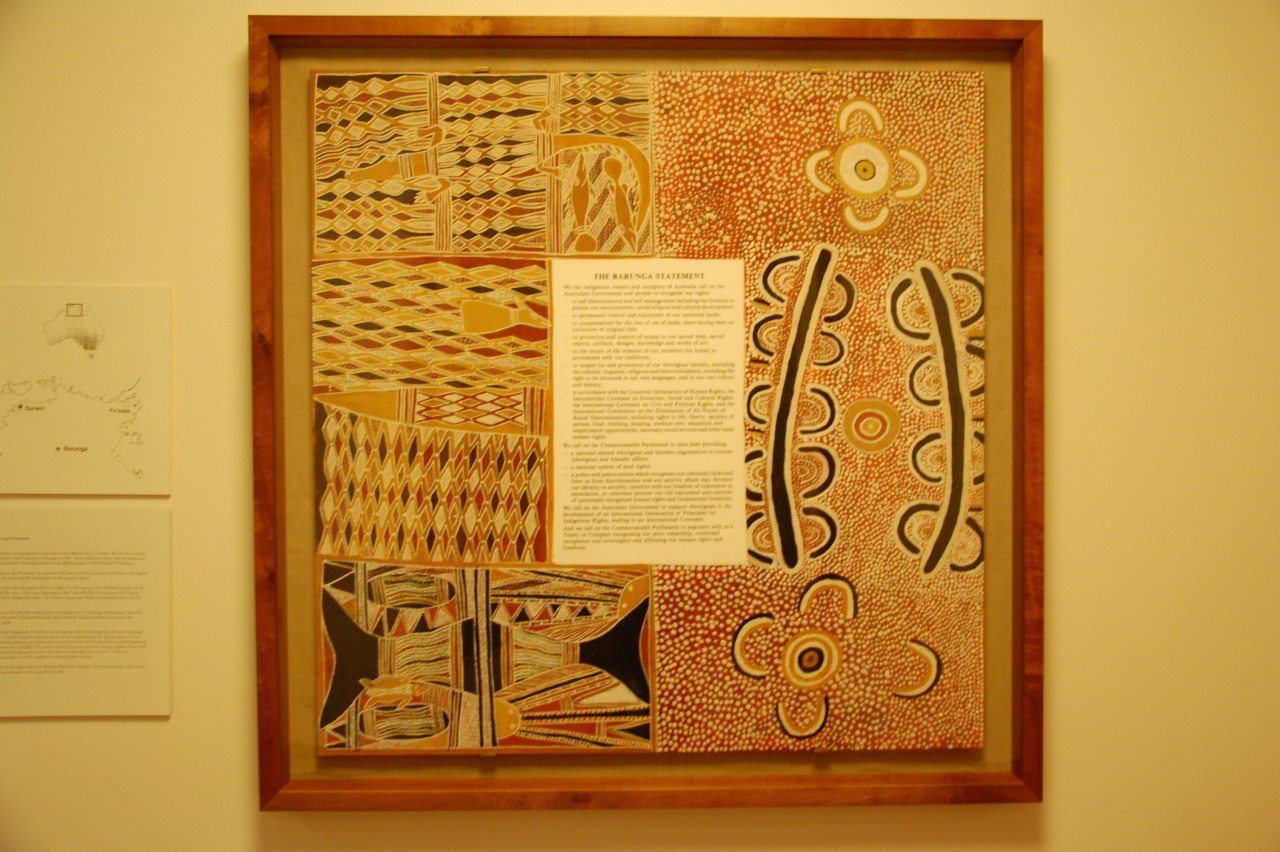
The Barunga Statement on display in Parliament House, Canberra

Between 1981 and 1986, a rise of 42% of people identifying as Aboriginal occurred across Australian census areas (see also separate section below). The rise roughly amount to "68,000 new claims of Aboriginal identity".

In 1988, as part of bicentennial celebrations, Prime Minister Bob Hawke was presented with a statement of Aboriginal political objectives by Galarrwuy Yunupingu and Wenten Rubuntja, in what became known as The Barunga Statement. Among many requests, the Statement called for the Australian government to facilitate "respect for and promotion of our Aboriginal identity, including the cultural, linguistic, religious and historical aspects, and including the right to be educated in our own languages and in our own culture and history".

==== Legal and administrative definitions since 1980 ====
In 1978, the Cabinet of the Australian Government offered a three-part definition, based on descent, self-identification, and community acceptance. (For the purposes of the Australian Census, the last factor is excluded as impractical.) A definition was proposed by the Department of Aboriginal Affairs in the Report on a Review of the Administration of the Working Definition of Aboriginal and Torres Strait Islanders (Canberra, 1981): "An Aboriginal or Torres Strait Islander is a person of Aboriginal or Torres Strait Islander descent who identifies as an Aboriginal or Torres Strait Islander and is accepted as such by the community in which he (she) lives". The 1981 Report added impetus to the definition, and it was soon adopted by all Government departments for determining eligibility to certain services and benefits. The definition was also adopted by the states, for example in the New South Wales Aboriginal Land Rights Act 1983. This definition has become known as the "Commonwealth Definition".

The change to Section 51(xxvi) following the 1967 Referendum enabled the Commonwealth parliament to enact laws specifically with respect to Aboriginal peoples as a "race". In the Tasmanian Dam Case of 1983, the High Court of Australia was asked to determine whether Commonwealth legislation, whose application could relate to Aboriginal people—parts of the World Heritage Properties Conservation Act 1983 (Cth) as well as related legislation—was supported by Section 51(xxvi) in its new form. The case concerned an application of legislation that would preserve the cultural heritage of Aboriginal Tasmanians. It was held that Aboriginal Australians and Torres Strait Islanders, together or separately, and any part of either, could be regarded as a "race" for this purpose. As to the criteria for identifying a person as a member of such a "race", the definition by Justice Deane has become accepted as current law. Deane said:

...By "Australian Aboriginal" I mean, in accordance with what I understand to be the conventional meaning of that term, a person of Aboriginal descent, albeit mixed, who identifies himself as such and who is recognised by the Aboriginal community as an Aboriginal.

While Deane's three-part definition reaches beyond the biological criterion to an individual's self-identification, it has been criticised as continuing to accept the biological criterion as primary. It has been found difficult to apply, both in each of its parts and as to the relations among the parts; biological "descent" has been a fall-back criterion.

A new definition was proposed in the Constitutional Section of the Department of Aboriginal Affairs' Report on a Review of the Administration of the Working Definition of Aboriginal and Torres Strait Islanders (Canberra, 1981):

An Aboriginal or Torres Strait Islander is a person of Aboriginal or Torres Strait Islander descent who identifies as an Aboriginal or Torres Strait Islander and is accepted as such by the community in which he (she) lives.

Justice Gerard Brennan in his 1992 leading judgment in Mabo v Queensland (No 2) stated that Aboriginality of a person depends on a tripartite test:

Membership of the Indigenous people depends on biological descent from the Indigenous people and on mutual recognition of a particular person's membership by that person and by the elders or other persons enjoying traditional authority among those people.

=== 1990s: Legal challenges ===
The Commonwealth Definition continued to be used administratively and legislatively, notably in the Mabo case, which in 1992 recognised native title in Australia for the first time. However, debate about the definition became heated, particularly in Tasmania, over whether the emphasis should be on identification by self and/or community or by descent. The Tasmanian Aboriginal Centre (TAC) emphasised evidence of descent, and started refusing services to people who had previously been identified as Aboriginal. A report commissioned by the Aboriginal and Torres Strait Islander Commission (ATSIC) found that people seeking to identify as Aboriginal should satisfy all three criteria, and should provide documentary evidence to show a direct line of ancestry through a family name linking them to traditional Aboriginal society at the time of colonisation of Tasmania. Debate over the issue was also included in three Federal Court judgements, with varying interpretations.

After 1999 ATSIC election, questions were raised about the Aboriginality of many of the 824 voters and some of those who were elected. Debate continued until November 2002, with the Administrative Appeals Tribunal (AAT), which referred the question to the Federal Court. The AAT found that

It is probable that there are in the wider Tasmanian community persons who have a degree of Aboriginal descent although there are no public records which support their claim. 2. Self identification and community recognition of applicants as Aborigines, particularly where there is evidence of a family history or tradition of Aboriginal descent passed on orally, can provide evidence of Aboriginal descent.

TAC complained that now more than a third of the 30 candidates standing in the election were "white", and called for a boycott.

== Other definitions ==
=== From Aboriginal Australians ===
- Eve Fesl, a Gabi-Gabi woman, wrote in the Aboriginal Law Bulletin in 1986: "The word aborigine' refers to an indigenous person of any country. If it is to be used to refer to us as a specific group of people, it should be spelt with a capital 'A', i.e., 'Aborigine'".
- Lowitja O'Donoghue, commenting on the prospect of possible amendments to Australia's constitution, said: "I really can't tell you of a time when indigenous became current, but I personally have an objection to it, and so do many other Aboriginal and Torres Strait Islander people. ... This has just really crept up on us ... like thieves in the night. ... We are very happy with our involvement with indigenous people around the world, on the international forum ... because they're our brothers and sisters. But we do object to it being used here in Australia." O'Donoghue said that the term Indigenous robbed the traditional owners of Australia of an identity because some non-Aboriginal people now wanted to refer to themselves as Indigenous because they were born there.

=== From academia ===
- Dean of Indigenous Research and Education at Charles Darwin University, Professor MaryAnn Bin-Sallik, has lectured on the ways Aboriginal Australians have been categorised and labelled over time. Her 2008 lecture offered a new perspective on the terms urban, traditional and of Indigenous descent as used to define and categorise Aboriginal Australians: "Not only are these categories inappropriate, they serve to divide us. ... Government's insistence on categorising us with modern words like 'urban', 'traditional' and 'of Aboriginal descent' are really only replacing old terms 'half-caste' and 'full-blood' – based on our colouring. She called for a replacement of this terminology by that of "Aborigine" or "Torres Strait Islander" – "irrespective of hue".

=== Use of the term "black" ===
The term "black" has been used to refer to Aboriginal Australians since European settlement. While originally related to skin colour and often used pejoratively, the term is used today to indicate Aboriginal heritage or culture in general and refers to any people of such heritage regardless of their level of skin pigmentation. In the 1970s, many Aboriginal activists, such as Gary Foley, proudly embraced the term "black", and writer Kevin Gilbert's book from the time was entitled Living Black. The book included interviews with several members of the Aboriginal community, including Robert Jabanungga, reflecting on contemporary Aboriginal culture. Use of this term varies depending on context and its use needs care as it may be deemed inappropriate.

== Factors affecting Aboriginal identity ==
=== Self-identification ===
Evidence from biographies has shown that, unlike white people, Aboriginal people do not define themselves in terms of race, but rather culture; Aboriginal historian Victoria Grieves says that the recency of one's Aboriginal ancestors does not determine one's identification as Aboriginal. Many intangible aspects of culture are transmitted through families and kinship systems. Often, having living Aboriginal relations is the main determinant of cultural connectedness. "Family, kinship, relatedness and connectedness are the basis of Aboriginal world-views and the philosophy that underpins the development of Aboriginal social organisation", she says.

Aboriginal identity contains interconnecting parts, some or all of which may constitute an individual's self-identification:

1. Peoplehood – "the persistence of Aboriginal peoplehood with a diversity of identities, and thereby relinquish[ing] romantic notions of singular Indigenous selfhood".
2. Beliefs or religion,
3. Culture, the celebration of the religio-cultural worldview and customs of Aboriginal lore.

Observing particular aspects of Aboriginal culture and spiritual beliefs help to maintain continuity and cohesiveness within a community. Ceremonies can play a large role in passing down Dreaming lore, customs connection to country, and laws of the group.

Recognition of Aboriginal land rights in Australia has played a decisive role in the development of Aboriginal identity, as "land rights has demanded that both Aborigines and white develop and articulate definitions of a unique Aboriginal identity." Academic Gordon Briscoe has also proposed that, among many other factors, Indigenous health has historically shaped this identity, particularly in relation to British settlement of Australia.

Anthropologist Ian Keen suggested in 2006 that the scale of varieties of Australian Aboriginal languages "plays an important role in questions of Aboriginal identity".

=== Subsets ===
There are subsets to Aboriginal identity in Australia. Regional versions relating to a specific Aboriginal sub-culture or sub-ethnic group include a large number of groupings, based on language, culture, traditional lands, demonym or other features, but there is also a broader "pan-Aboriginal self-identification".

=== Non-Indigenous perceptions ===
Aboriginal music has been positively utilised in public performances to non-participating audiences to further enhance public recognition in, and the development of, Aboriginal identity within modern Australia. Historian Rebe Taylor, who specialises in Australian Indigenous peoples and European settlement, has been critical of negative associations of Aboriginal identity, such as with the Australian welfare system.

== 2020 court ruling about non-alien status ==
On 11 February 2020 the High Court of Australia, in a judgement affecting two court cases (Love v Commonwealth of Australia; Thoms v Commonwealth of Australia: [2020] HCA 3), first used the tripartite test used by Justice Brennan in Mabo v Queensland (No 2) (1992) to determine Aboriginality of the two plaintiffs. The court then determined that if a person is thus deemed to be an Aboriginal Australian, they cannot be regarded as an alien in Australia, even if they hold foreign citizenship. The two men concerned, Daniel Love and Brendan Thomas, could not thus be deported as aliens under the provisions of the Migration Act 1958, after both had earlier been convicted of criminal offences and served time in prison until 2018.

Having determined that both men (Love and Thoms) fulfilled the criteria of identification as Aboriginal, the Justices held "that it is not open to the Parliament to treat an Aboriginal Australian as an "alien" because the constitutional term does not extend to a person who could not possibly answer the description of "alien" according to the ordinary understanding of the word. Aboriginal Australians have a special cultural, historical and spiritual connection with the territory of Australia, which is central to their traditional laws and customs and which is recognised by the common law. The existence of that connection is inconsistent with holding that an Aboriginal Australian is an alien within the meaning of s 51(xix) of the Constitution".

== Contemporary discourse ==
In 2019, Bruce Pascoe was the subject of a media controversy regarding the identity of fair-skinned Aboriginal people.

In a 2011 case, Eatock v Bolt, the Federal Court of Australia found that columnist Andrew Bolt had breached the Racial Discrimination Act 1975 in two newspaper articles. Bolt claimed that certain prominent Aboriginal people with fair skin were claiming to be Aboriginal for perceived advantages. The articles questioned whether these people were "Aboriginal enough". The presiding judge Justice Bromberg found that the articles contained "erroneous facts, distortions of the truth and inflammatory and provocative language".

In 2014, an ARC Indigenous research fellow, Warraimaay historian Dr Victoria Grieves Williams of the University of Sydney argued that further "understanding of the true nature of Aboriginal identity gives us an opportunity to begin to make decisions on who has the right to claim Aboriginality." Writing in The Sydney Morning Herald in 2016, Ben Wyatt called on all Australian citizens to recognize the "ancient identity and story of Aboriginal Australians", and that it was "this identity, this story, which still remains to be embraced, captured and adopted by all Australians". Later that year, Will Hodgman announced a relaxation to rules regarding the identity of Aboriginal Tasmanians. Causing some backlash in the Aboriginal community, the Tasmanian Aboriginal Centre (reconstructionists of the Palawa kani language) protested that the Premier of Tasmania's proposals would mean that residents need only "'tick a box' if they wanted to claim Aboriginality" and that "the community would be 'swamped with white people'".

In March 2019, Mark Latham announced the One Nation party's plans to introduce reforms to "tighten the eligibility rules for Aboriginal identity" in Australia, which would "require DNA evidence of at least 25 per cent Indigenous - the equivalent of one fully Aboriginal grandparent."

In May 2019, The Guardian revealed how Liberal Party candidate Jacinta Price, daughter of Aboriginal activist Bess Price, had received criticism for incorrectly calling into question a constituent's Aboriginal identity, referring to him as a white Australian.

In June 2019, government minister Ben Wyatt, who had admitted struggling with his own Aboriginal identity as a teenager, praised NAIDOC Week for its "strong celebration of Aboriginal identity and culture".

In July 2019, an ABC News "Indigenous" piece reviewed Anita Heiss's Growing Up Aboriginal in Australia, which reported how the book was helping to counter the "racist myth of a singular Aboriginal identity". Similarly, ABC Innovation's Little Yarns podcast aims to "celebrate the diversity of Indigenous cultures and languages", dispelling misconceptions regarding a "homogeneous Aboriginal identity".

In late 2019, author Bruce Pascoe's Aboriginal identity was questioned by Bolt and a few Aboriginal people associated with the groups he had written about as his ancestors (Yuin, Bunurong and Aboriginal Tasmanian). Pascoe was also supported by members of these groups as well as prominent Aboriginal identities. The controversy led to fair-skinned Aboriginal people across the country being questioned about their Aboriginality.

In December 2019, a video of a fair-skinned Aboriginal man being confronted by two neighbours in his home went viral. The video showed a woman attempting to tear down an Aboriginal flag, while both questioning the man's Aboriginality and using anti-Aboriginal racial slurs. Former Federal Government Senator Nova Peris remarked upon the contradiction, tweeting how the woman "in her rage, unable to think rationally blurt[ed] out her final angry remarks of ‘go & live in a humpy on the river’ yet seconds earlier... was adamant...they weren't Aboriginal."

== Reasons for growth in census figures ==
The numbers of Indigenous-identifying people have grown since 1986 at a rate far exceeding that of the whole population and what would be expected from natural increase. This rise has been attributed to various factors, including increased preparedness to identify as Indigenous and by the propensity for children of mixed partnerships to identify as Indigenous. One possible confounding factor is that the census question allows a person to acknowledge both Aboriginal and Torres Strait Islander origins but does not allow a person to acknowledge both Indigenous and non-Indigenous origins – perhaps leading to the expectation that people of mixed Aboriginal and non-Aboriginal origin will identify as Aboriginal. Other reasons suggested after the 2021 census increase include a high fertility rate and a reduction of fear that used to accompany identification as Aboriginal, and an increasing pride in their identity.

In urban Australia there is a high proportion of such mixed partnerships (incidentally, much higher than black/white partnerships in the United States). By 2002, it appeared that there was likely to be a narrowing of the gap between the socioeconomic indicators of the two groups, particularly in urban areas, leading to government policy possibly moving away from Indigenous-specific services or benefits in these areas.

=== 2021 census ===
In the 2021 Australian census, 812,000 people identified as Aboriginal and/or Torres Strait Islander, representing 3.2% of the population. This was an increase from 2.8% in 2016 (i.e. about 25%increase), and 2.5% in 2011. Of these:

- 91.4% identified as Aboriginal
- 4.2% identified as Torres Strait Islander
- 4.4% identified as both Aboriginal and Torres Strait Islander.

However, the net undercount of Aboriginal and Torres Strait Islander people was 17.4%, and the estimated Indigenous population is around 952,000 to 1,000,000, or just under 4 per cent of the total population.

== See also ==
- Country (Indigenous Australians)
- Welcome to Country
- Native American identity in the United States
