= Section 127 of the Constitution of Australia =

Section 127 of the Constitution of Australia was the final section within Chapter VII (dealing with miscellaneous matters) of the Australian Constitution, and excluded Indigenous Australians from population counts for constitutional purposes. It came into effect on 1 January 1901 when the founding states federated into the Commonwealth of Australia, and was repealed effective 10 August 1967 following the 1967 referendum.

== Text ==
Section 127 was included in the Constitution of Australia when it was ratified, and stated that:

In reckoning the numbers of the people of the Commonwealth, or of a State or other part of the Commonwealth, aboriginal natives shall not be counted.

The interpretation of section 127 depends on the language used in other parts of the Constitution. Section 24 mandates that each state is entitled to members in the House of Representatives based on a population quota determined from the "latest statistics of the Commonwealth." These statistics arise from the census conducted under the auspices of section 51(xi). The purpose of section 127 was to prevent the inclusion of Aboriginal people in section 24 determinations, and thus to prevent the Indigenous populace from influencing the determination of electoral boundaries by the Australian Electoral Commission. Including Indigenous people in these calculations would alter the distribution of seats between the states to the benefit of states with larger Aboriginal populations (though not to the benefit of the Aboriginal people). Concerns were expressed at the 1897–98 Federation Convention about the distribution of seats and also the possibility of states receiving reduced monies from Commonwealth grants if section 127 were not included.

The language of section 127 does not include the words statistic or census, and consequently the Commonwealth had the power to collect data on the Aboriginal populace, though what was collected lacked quality and comprehensiveness. Its purpose was not to deny information to the government but to give effect to a belief that the indigenous peoples of Australia were separate from the colonists joining together to form a nation. As the British gradually acquired sovereignty over the continent, Aboriginal peoples became British subjects. After Federation, the "Australian governments and the people had no use for the Aborigines." Consideration of the Indigenous population was limited to the "problem" of the potential for their number to influence the composition of the House of Representatives, and that was "solved" with section 127. Actual responsibility for the Aboriginal people was left to the individual states (explaining their exclusion from race power); this contributed to the mistaken belief that Aboriginal Australians were considered as 'flora and fauna' until the 1967 referendum on the status of Aboriginals, which was originally the metaphor of pioneer Aboriginal filmmaker Lester Bostock to describe the status of Indigenous Australians, not a statement of fact. Constitutional scholar George Williams has described the race power and section 127 as part of the racism in Australia's constitutional DNA. In the 1960s in the lead-up to the repeal of section 127, racist attitudes towards Aborigines were openly expressed. For example, the Sydney Morning Herald characterised the idea of trying to count the indigenous population as part of the census as both "a mildly entertaining historical oddity" and as "more difficult than rounding up a mob of wild brumbies".

== Repeal ==
The Holt government held two constitutional referendums on 27 May 1967, and amendments relating to Indigenous Australians were carried overwhelmingly with 90.8% of votes cast in favour. Technically, the referendum passed the bill titled the Constitution Alteration (Aboriginals) 1967 and it became law on 10 August 1967. The referendum altered section 51(xxvi) and allowed the Federal Parliament to legislate for the benefit of the Aboriginal people located in the states (they were already so empowered in the territories by section 122). Additionally, the High Court decision in Kartinyeri v Commonwealth ruled that legislating to the detriment of Indigenous Australians was also within the scope of the power. Section 127 was repealed in its entirety and had the immediate effect of including Aboriginal Australians in population estimates.

The other question put in the referendum, to allow the number of seats in the House of Representatives to be increased without increasing the number of senators, was rejected. Other racially discriminatory parts of the Constitution were left in place.

=== Consequences ===
One immediate consequence of the repeal of section 127 was that full inclusion of Indigenous people in the census became mandatory and that the Commonwealth government could make laws for them. Additionally this meant that the Aboriginal population was reflected in the allocation of seats in the House of Representatives between the states.

== Other sources ==
- Attwood, Bain; Markus, Andrew (2007). The 1967 Referendum: Race, Power and the Australian Constitution. Aboriginal Studies Press. ISBN 9780855755553.
- Brennan, Frank (2015). No Small Change: The Road to Recognition for Indigenous Australia. University of Queensland Press. ISBN 9780702254505.

== See also ==
- Section 25 of the Constitution of Australia
- Three-Fifths Compromise, similar clause in U.S. Constitution that limited total count of slaves in censuses to 60% of total for purposes of allocating seats in Congress.
