= Expansion of the Australian Parliament =

Expansion of the Australian Parliament has been proposed various times in history. As of 2026, expansions of the Australian Parliament have occurred in 1949 and 1984. The news media and analysts in Australia have speculated that another expansion may take place. Complaints have been raised that MPs are serving too many constituents, overloading their offices with excessive amounts of work. The Australian Senate is currently made up of 76 senators and the House of Representatives contains 150 MPs.

== 1949 ==
In 1949, the Australian Parliament was expanded from 75 to 123 seats following the passage of the Representation Act 1948 by the Chifley government.

When the bill to expand Parliament was being considered in 1948, the Liberal–Country Coalition voted against the expansion of both chambers. The Coalition was concerned about the introduction of proportional representation to the Senate voting system and suggested a double dissolution as a potential fix but this was not accepted by the government.

== 1984 ==
The Australian Parliament previously expanded the amount of seats in the House of Representatives from 125 to 148 seats under the Hawke government.

When the changes were being considered by Parliament in 1983, the Liberal Party opposed such changes, while the National Party supported them. In Parliament, the Nationals broke with the Coalition to vote with the government and deliver the expansion of Parliament. The National Party received analysis that said they could gain more seats.

== Committee ==
In 2023, the Joint Standing Committee on Electoral Matters considered increasing the size of the House of Representatives from by 49 members from 151 to 200. The committee said that increasing the size of the House would ensure the principle of "one vote, one value" is better adhered to. The committee also assessed proposals to increase the House to 175 seats. The committee assessed increasing the size of the Senate to 92 seats with an increase of two to four senators elected from each territory.

== Future ==
In 2023, The Sydney Morning Herald reported that the Albanese government is considering its options as to expanding Parliament.

Progressive think tank The Australia Institute has proposed expanding the House of Representatives to a similar size proportional to the 1984 Hawke government's reforms would equal about 223 to 234 House seats and up to 122 senators.

Electoral analyst Kevin Bonham has suggested expanding Parliament by one-sixth, which will elect 14 senators per state and about 175 MPs, or an expansion of one-third, which would result in states electing 16 senators and 200 MPs. He said that an expansion by one-third may be favourable to Labor and the Greens in the Senate, but would have no effect in the House of Representatives.

Electoral analyst Malcolm Mackerras suggested expanding the House of Representatives to 175 seats and expanding the number of senators that are elected in states to 14, he also suggested giving the ACT one more senator.

The Parliamentary Budget Office has determined that expanding Parliament by 24 MPs and two new senators would cost about $42 million from 2027 to 2028.

The Liberal Party has indicated that they would oppose an increase to the size of Parliament. The National Party has expressed support for such reforms.

In a speech on 2 April 2026 at the National Press Club, prime minister Anthony Albanese dismissed the idea of expanding Parliament, saying that triggering a negative campaign against it would not "be healthy for our democracy". Divisive campaigning played a major role in the failed 2023 Voice to Paraliament referendum.

== Constitutional provisions ==
Section 24 of the Australian Constitution requires that "the number of such members [of the House of Representatives] shall be, as near as practicable, twice the number of the senators". This means that if the House of Representatives increases its number of members, the Senate will also be required to double the amount of its seats.
