= 1967 Australian referendum =

The 1967 Australian referendum occurred on 27 May 1967 under the Holt government. It contained three topics asked about in two questions, regarding the passage of two bills to alter the Australian Constitution.

The first question (Constitution Alteration (Parliament) Bill 1967) sought to increase the number of Members in the House of Representatives. The second question (Constitution Alteration (Aboriginals) Bill 1967) related to Indigenous Australians (referred to as "the Aboriginal Race") and was in two parts: whether to give the Federal Government the power to make laws for Indigenous Australians in states, and whether in population counts for constitutional purposes to include all Indigenous Australians.

Results (Note: Handbook of the 44th Parliament (2014) "Part 5 - Referendums and Plebiscites - Referendum results". Parliamentary Library of Australia.)
Question	NSW	Vic	Qld	SA	WA	Tas	States in favour	Voters in favour	Result
(25) Parliament	Yes	No	No	No	No	No	1:5	40%	Not carried
(26) Aboriginal people	Yes	Yes	Yes	Yes	Yes	Yes	6:0	91%	Carried

== Results in detail ==
=== Parliament ===
Result
State	Electoral roll	Ballots issued	For		Against		Informal
State	Electoral roll	Ballots issued	Vote	%	Vote	%	Informal
New South Wales	2,315,828	2,166,507	1,087,694	51.01	1,044,458	48.99	34,355
Victoria	1,734,476	1,630,594	496,826	30.87	1,112,506	69.13	21,262
Queensland	904,808	848,728	370,200	44.13	468,673	55.87	9,855
South Australia	590,275	560,844	186,344	33.91	363,120	66.09	11,380
Western Australia	437,609	405,666	114,841	29.05	280,523	70.95	10,302
Tasmania	199,589	189,245	42,764	23.06	142,660	76.94	3,821
Total for Commonwealth	6,182,585	5,801,584	2,298,669	40.25	3,411,940	59.75	90,975
Results	Obtained majority in one state and an overall minority of 1,113,271 votes. Not carried						

This section is an excerpt from 1967 Australian referendum (Parliament) § Results

=== Aboriginal people ===
Result
State	Electoral roll	Ballots issued	For		Against		Informal
State	Electoral roll	Ballots issued	Vote	%	Vote	%	Informal
New South Wales	2,315,828	2,166,507	1,949,036	91.46	182,010	8.54	35,461
Victoria	1,734,476	1,630,594	1,525,026	94.68	85,611	5.32	19,957
Queensland	904,808	848,728	748,612	89.21	90,587	10.79	9,529
South Australia	590,275	560,844	473,440	86.26	75,383	13.74	12,021
Western Australia	437,609	405,666	319,823	80.95	75,282	19.05	10,561
Tasmania	199,589	189,245	167,176	90.21	18,134	9.79	3,935
Total for Commonwealth	6,182,585	5,801,584	5,183,113	90.77	527,007	9.23	91,464
Results	Obtained majority in all six states and an overall majority of 4,656,106 votes. Carried						

This section is an excerpt from 1967 Australian referendum (Aboriginals) § Results

== See also ==
- Referendums in Australia
- Politics of Australia
- History of Australia
