= 1967 Australian referendum (Parliament) =

1967 Parliament referendum
- 27 May 1967
- Question 1 Do you approve the proposed law for the alteration of the Constitution entitled— 'An Act to alter the Constitution so that the number of members of the House of Representatives may be increased without necessarily increasing the number of Senators'?

Results
Choice	Votes	%
Yes	2,298,669	40.25%
No	3,411,940	59.75%
Valid votes	5,710,609	98.43%
Invalid or blank votes	90,975	1.57%
Total votes	5,801,584	100.00%
Registered voters/turnout	6,182,585	93.84%
- Results by county

The first part of the 1967 Australian referendum to change the Constitution was the Parliament question, which related to the relative number of members in each house of the Australian Parliament − the so-called "nexus". The 1967 Australian referendum called by the Holt government on 27 May 1967 consisted of two parts, with the second question relating to Aboriginal Australians.

Section 24 of the Australian Constitution requires that the number of members in the House of Representatives be, as nearly as possible, twice the number of members in the Senate. The most important effect of the "nexus" in the Australian Constitution is to prevent the dilution of the collective voting power of the Senate, which represents the Australian states equally, in any joint sitting of both houses following a double dissolution election. The nexus ensures that Senators will always have about one-third of the votes in a joint sitting, and Members of the House of Representatives about two-thirds. The referendum question asked the public to vote on whether "the number of members of the House of Representatives may be increased without necessarily increasing the number of Senators". It was defeated, with 59.75% of voters voting "No" to this question.

== Question ==
Do you approve the proposed law for the alteration of the Constitution entitled 'An Act to alter the Constitution so that the number of members of the House of Representatives may be increased without necessarily increasing the number of Senators'?

== Results ==
Result (Note: Handbook of the 44th Parliament (2014) "Part 5 - Referendums and Plebiscites - Referendum results". Parliamentary Library of Australia.)
State	Electoral roll	Ballots issued	For		Against		Informal
State	Electoral roll	Ballots issued	Vote	%	Vote	%	Informal
New South Wales	2,315,828	2,166,507	1,087,694	51.01	1,044,458	48.99	34,355
Victoria	1,734,476	1,630,594	496,826	30.87	1,112,506	69.13	21,262
Queensland	904,808	848,728	370,200	44.13	468,673	55.87	9,855
South Australia	590,275	560,844	186,344	33.91	363,120	66.09	11,380
Western Australia	437,609	405,666	114,841	29.05	280,523	70.95	10,302
Tasmania	199,589	189,245	42,764	23.06	142,660	76.94	3,821
Total for Commonwealth	6,182,585	5,801,584	2,298,669	40.25	3,411,940	59.75	90,975
Results	Obtained majority in one state and an overall minority of 1,113,271 votes. Not carried						

== See also ==
- Referendums in Australia
- Politics of Australia
- History of Australia
