= Section 51(xi) of the Constitution of Australia =

Section 51(xi) of the Constitution of Australia, a subsection of section 51, grants the Commonwealth the power to make laws for "census and statistics".

== Background ==
The first version of the Constitution included a census power. Its inclusion was not controversial. It can be seen as a class of "nationhood powers" which reflected basic powers that a "nation" was viewed with possessing (similar nationhood powers would include the currency power, the weights and measures power, and the postal power).

Australian colonies had collected statistics from settlement. The first simultaneous census was held across Australia in 1881 as part of the Census of the British Empire.

In December 1905 the Commonwealth Government passed the Census and Statistics Act 1905.

The first Commonwealth Census after federation was held in 1911 (although a simultaneous state census was held in 1901).

The Australian Bureau of Statistics is the Commonwealth agency responsible for census and statistics.

== Related Constitution sections ==
Section 24 says the number of members in the House of Representatives per state will be based on the based on quotas based on population, which will be based on "the latest statistics of the Commonwealth" (s. 24(i) and s. 24(ii)). Section 24 evinces a clear intention that the Commonwealth would use section 51(xi) to conduct census and collect information, rather than leaving the matter to the states.

Section 127 stated that "in reckoning the numbers of the people ... aboriginal natives should not be counted." This section was removed by a referendum to amend the constitution that was held in 1967.

Section 127 did not use the word "census" or "statistics" – the language of s. 51(xi). On a purposive approach, the debates at the Constitutional Conventions showed the clear purpose of section 127 was to limit section 24. Section 127 operated to prevent the number of Aboriginal Australians being used in the calculations for the number of members of the House of Representatives. Section 127 was quite a narrow provision, in that it did not use the word "statistics". Accordingly, section 51(xi) still allowed the Commonwealth had the power to collect statistics on Aboriginal people which it did, according population numbers.
