= ABC Digital Network Division =

ABC Digital Network Division, formerly ABC Innovation, was a division of the Australian Broadcasting Corporation. ABC Innovation was formed in early 2007 to develop digital products and services across the ABC, taking over many of the services previously managed by the New Media and Digital Services division, including ABC Online.

In 2015, ABC Innovation was replaced by the ABC Digital Network Division, but by 2017 the Digital Network fell under the Chief Technology Officer, and the name is no longer in existence.

== History ==
The ABC established its original Multimedia Unit in 1995, to manage the corporation's website (launched in August that year). Although the unit at first relied upon funding allocation to the corporation's television and radio operations, in subsequent budgets it began to receive its own. The ABC provided live, online election coverage for the first time in 1996, although it was not until 1997 that limited news content was provided.

ABC Multimedia was renamed ABC New Media and Digital Services in 2000, at the same time becoming an "output division" similar to television or radio. The department continued to perform the same functions, in addition to taking control of the ABC's first digital television channels - Fly TV and ABC Kids. Broadband news services were introduced in 2001.

The formation of ABC Innovation was announced in February 2007. In March 2007, ABC Innovation led the corporation's establishment of an "ABC Island" in virtual world Second Life, launched with a live simulcast of a Four Corners program on virtual worlds titled "You Only Live Twice". The division won a Content+Technology|Content+Technology (C+T) Award in the Rich Media category on 18 July 2007, for its work in developing ABC Island.

In September 2007, ABC Innovation created a mobile off-deck portal providing coverage of the Australian Federal Election which could be downloaded to mobile devices.

ABC NOW, a desktop application combining the ABC television, radio and news RSS feeds, was released on 3 December 2007.

In March 2012, Angela Clark was appointed head of the ABC Innovation unit.

In 2015, the ABC Managing Director Mark Scott announced that the Innovation Division would be replaced with an ABC Digital Network Division, with the aim of prioritising the ABC's online and mobile initiatives. Clark remained head of the Division until the end of financial year 2015/6, but by 2017 she was gone, and the Digital Network fell into the Technology division under the Chief Technology Officer. In May 2017, Helen Clifton was appointed to the new role of Chief Digital and Information Officer, which continues as of June 2020.
