= Australian Senate =

Upper house of the Parliament of Australia

Coordinates: 35°18′28″S 149°07′26″E

Senate
- 48th Parliament of Australia

Type
- Type: Upper house of the Parliament of Australia

Leadership
- President: Sue Lines, Labor since 26 July 2022
- Leader of the Government: Penny Wong, Labor since 1 June 2022
- Manager of Government Business: Katy Gallagher, Labor since 1 June 2022
- Leader of the Opposition: Michaelia Cash, Liberal since 25 January 2025
- Manager of Opposition Business: Jonathon Duniam, Liberal since 25 January 2025

Structure
- Seats: 76
- Political groups: Government (30): Labor (30); Opposition (27); Coalition: Liberal (23) (Note: Including two Liberal National Party of Queensland (LNP) senators and one Country Liberal Party senator who sit in the Liberal party room.); National (4) (Note: Including two Liberal National Party of Queensland (LNP) senators who sit in the National party room.); Crossbench (19): Greens (10); One Nation (4); Lambie Network (1); United Australia (1); Australia's Voice (1); Independent (2) (Note: David Pocock (ACT); Lidia Thorpe (Vic))
- Length of term: 6 years (state senators); 3 years (territory senators)

Elections
- Voting system: Proportional representation (single transferable vote)
- Last election: 3 May 2025 (Half Senate election)
- Next election: On or before 20 May 2028

Meeting place
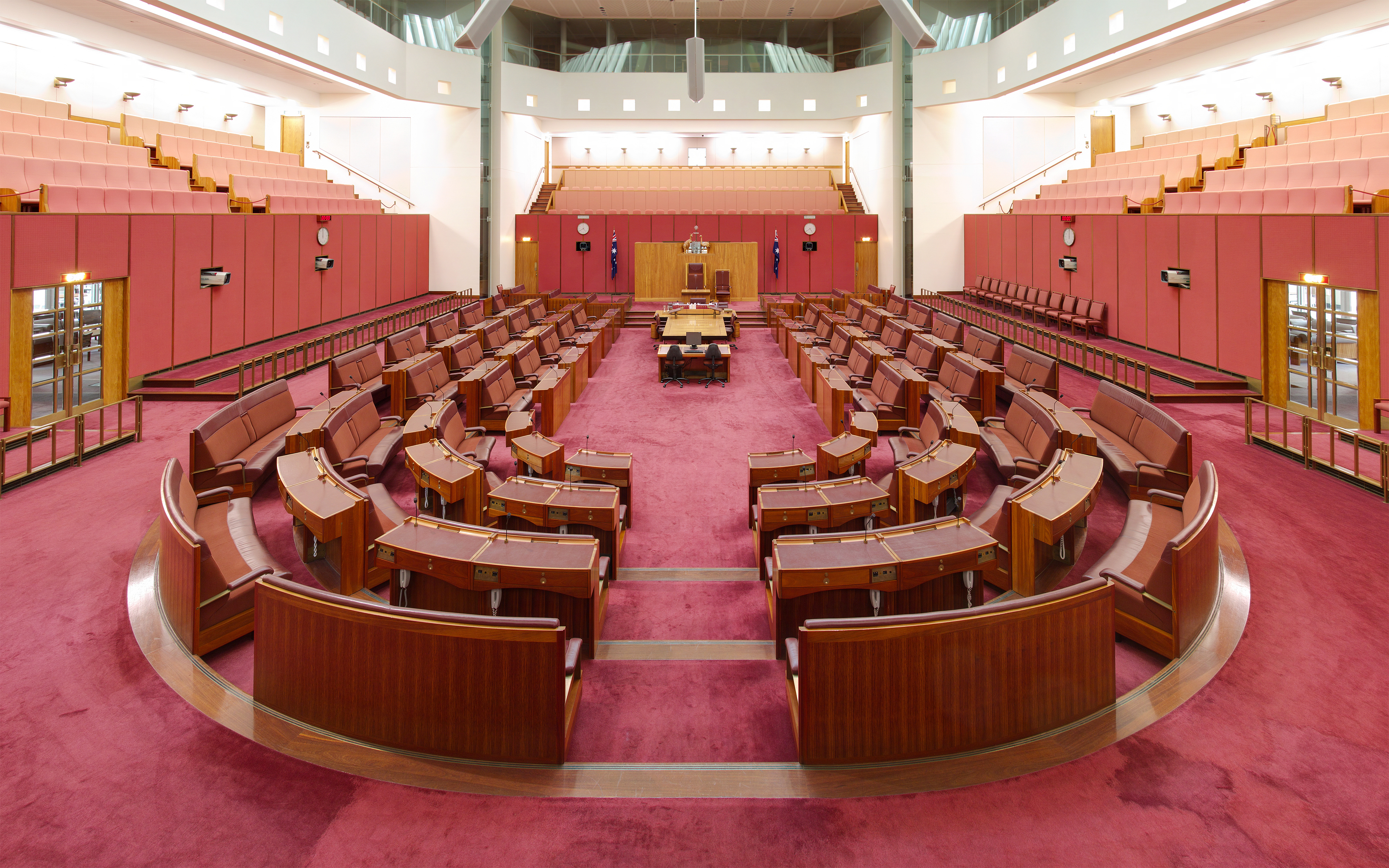
- Senate Chamber; Parliament House; Canberra, Australian Capital Territory, Australia

Website
- aph.gov.au/About_Parliament/Senate

The Senate is a chamber of the bicameral Parliament of Australia; it is the upper house, with the lower house being the House of Representatives. The powers, role and composition of the Senate are set out in Chapter I of the Constitution of Australia as well as federal legislation and constitutional convention.

There are a total of 76 senators: 12 are elected from each of the six Australian states, regardless of population, and 2 each representing the Australian Capital Territory (including the Jervis Bay Territory and Norfolk Island) and the Northern Territory (including the Australian Indian Ocean Territories). Senators are popularly elected under the single transferable vote system of proportional representation in state-wide and territory-wide districts.

Section 24 of the Constitution provides that the House of Representatives shall have, as near as practicable, twice as many members as the Senate. The constitution grants the Senate nearly equivalent powers to the House, with the exception that the Senate may not originate or amend money bills, but only reject or defer them. According to convention, the Senate plays no role in the formation of the executive government and the prime minister is drawn from the majority party or coalition in the House. However, the government appoints a Senate leader and senators hold senior roles in the government as ministers of state and members of cabinet. Senators from the opposition likewise serve in the shadow ministry.

The Senate elects one of its members to serve as president, who exercises only an ordinary vote and has no casting vote. Since the late 20th century, it has been rare for governments to hold a majority in the Senate and the balance of power has typically rested with minor parties and independents. In practice, this means government bills cannot be assured of passage and regulations may be disallowed. The power to bring down the government and force elections by blocking supply also exists, as happened for the first and only time during the 1975 constitutional crisis. Since major reforms in 1970, the Senate's role as a house of review has increased with the expansion of its committee system.

Senators from states ordinarily serve six-year terms, with half of the Senate up for re-election at each federal election along with the entirety of the House of Representatives. However, there is no constitutional requirement that Senate and House elections occur at the same time; the last Senate-only and House-only elections occurred in 1970 and 1972 respectively. The terms of senators from territories expire at the dissolution of the House of Representatives, typically at three-year intervals. Section 57 of the constitution provides for a double dissolution as a mechanism to break deadlocks between the House and Senate, whereby the entire Senate is dissolved and all seats made vacant.

Casual vacancies are filled by the relevant state or territory parliament, or by the corresponding state or territory government on an interim basis if the parliament is not in session. A constitutional amendment passed in 1977 provides that casual vacancies must be filled by a member of the same political party as the previous senator.

== Origins and role ==
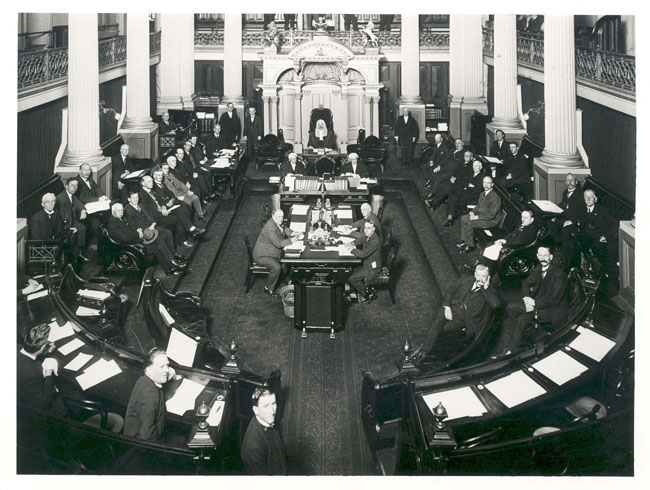
The Australian Senate in 1923

The Constitution of Australia founded the Senate as the upper house of the national parliament of the newly federated Australia. In contrast to countries employing a pure Westminster system, the Senate plays an active role in legislation and is not merely a 'chamber of review'. Instead of being modelled solely after the House of Lords, as the Senate of Canada was, the Australian Senate was in part modelled after the United States Senate, by giving equal representation to each state and practically full equal legislative powers (except concerning money bills, which can not be introduced in the Senate, but may be rejected, amended, or deferred in the chamber, which famously occurred during the Dismissal of the government led by Gough Whitlam in 1975), along with the lower house. This was done to give less populous states a real influence in the Parliament, while also maintaining the traditional review functions upper houses have in the Westminster system. This has led to the description of a "Washminster system" (that is, a hybrid of the US Washington D.C. and UK Westminster political systems) to describe the Australian political structure.

Although the prime minister and treasurer, by convention (though not legal requirement), are members of the House of Representatives (after John Gorton was appointed prime minister in 1968, he resigned from the Senate and was elected to the House), other ministers may come from either house, and the two Houses have almost equal legislative power. As with most upper chambers in bicameral parliaments, the Senate cannot introduce or amend appropriation bills (bills that authorise government expenditure of public revenue) or bills that impose taxation, that role being reserved for the lower house; it can only approve, reject or defer them. That degree of equality between the Senate and House of Representatives reflects the desire of the Constitution's authors to prevent the more populous states totally dominating the legislative process.

In practice, however, most legislation (except for private member's bills) in the Australian Parliament is initiated by the government, which has control over the lower house. It is then passed to the Senate, which has the opportunity to amend the bill, pass or reject it. In the majority of cases, voting takes place along party lines, although there are occasional conscience votes.

The Senate maintains a number of committees, which engage in a wide variety of inquiries. The results have no direct legislative power, but are valuable forums that raise many points of view that would otherwise not receive government or public notice.

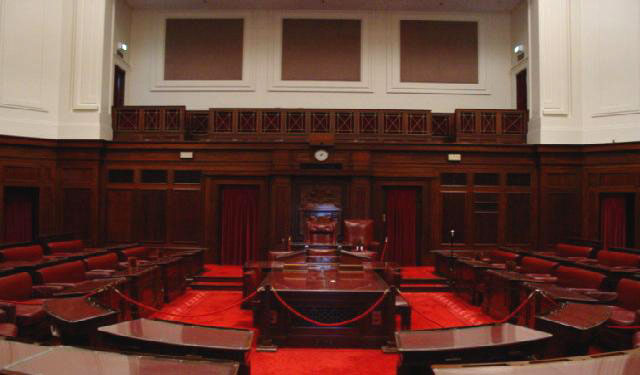
The Senate chamber at Old Parliament House, Canberra, where the Parliament met between 1927 and 1988.

== Electoral system ==
The system for electing senators has changed several times since Federation. The original arrangement involved a first-past-the-post and block voting system, on a state-by-state basis. This was replaced in 1919 by preferential block voting. Block voting tended to produce landslide majorities. For instance, from 1920 to 1923 the Nationalist Party held all but one of the 36 seats, and from 1947 to 1950, the Australian Labor Party held all but three.

In 1948, single transferable vote with proportional representation on a state-by-state basis became the method for electing senators. At this time the number of senators was expanded from 36 to 60 and it was argued that a move to proportional representation was needed to even up the balance between both major parties in the chamber. The change in voting systems has been described as an "institutional revolution" that has had the effect of limiting the government's ability to control the chamber, as well as helping the rise of Australian minor parties.

The 1984 election saw the introduction of group ticket voting, in order to reduce a high rate of informal voting that arose from the requirement that each candidate be given a preference, and to allow small parties and independent candidates a reasonable chance of winning a seat. This allowed voters to select a single party to distribute their preferences on their behalf (voting "above the line"), but voters were still able to vote directly for individual candidates and distribute their own preferences if they wished (voting "below the line") by numbering every box. Following 1981, the government has only had a majority in the Senate from 2005 to 2007; otherwise, negotiations with other parties and independents have generally been necessary to pass legislation.

Group tickets were abolished in advance of the 2016 election to reduce the number of senators elected with a very small number of first preference votes as a result of the candidates of these micro-parties preferencing each other. In the place of group tickets, a form of optional preferential voting was introduced. As a result of the changes, voters may now assign their preferences for parties above the line (numbering as many boxes as they wish), or individual candidates below the line, and are not required to fill all of the boxes. Both above and below the line voting now use optional preferential voting. For above the line, voters are instructed to number at least their first six preferences; however, a "savings provision" is in place to ensure that ballots will still be counted if less than six are given. For below the line, voters are required to number at least their first 12 preferences. Voters are free to continue numbering as many preferences as they like beyond the minimum number specified. Another savings provision allows ballot papers with at least 6 below the line preferences to be formal. The voting changes make it more difficult for new small parties and independent candidates to be elected to the Senate, but also allow a voter to voluntarily exhaust preferences — that is, to ensure their vote cannot flow to specific candidates or parties — if none of the voter's candidate preferences are elected.

The changes were subject to a challenge in front of High Court of Australia by sitting South Australian senator Bob Day of the Family First Party. The senator argued that the changes meant the senators would not be "directly chosen by the people" as required by the constitution. The High Court rejected Day's challenge unanimously, deciding that both above the line and below the line voting were consistent with the constitution.

=== Ballot paper ===
The Australian Senate voting paper under the single transferable vote proportional representation system resembles the following example (shown in two parts), which shows the candidates for Victorian senate representation in the 2016 federal election.

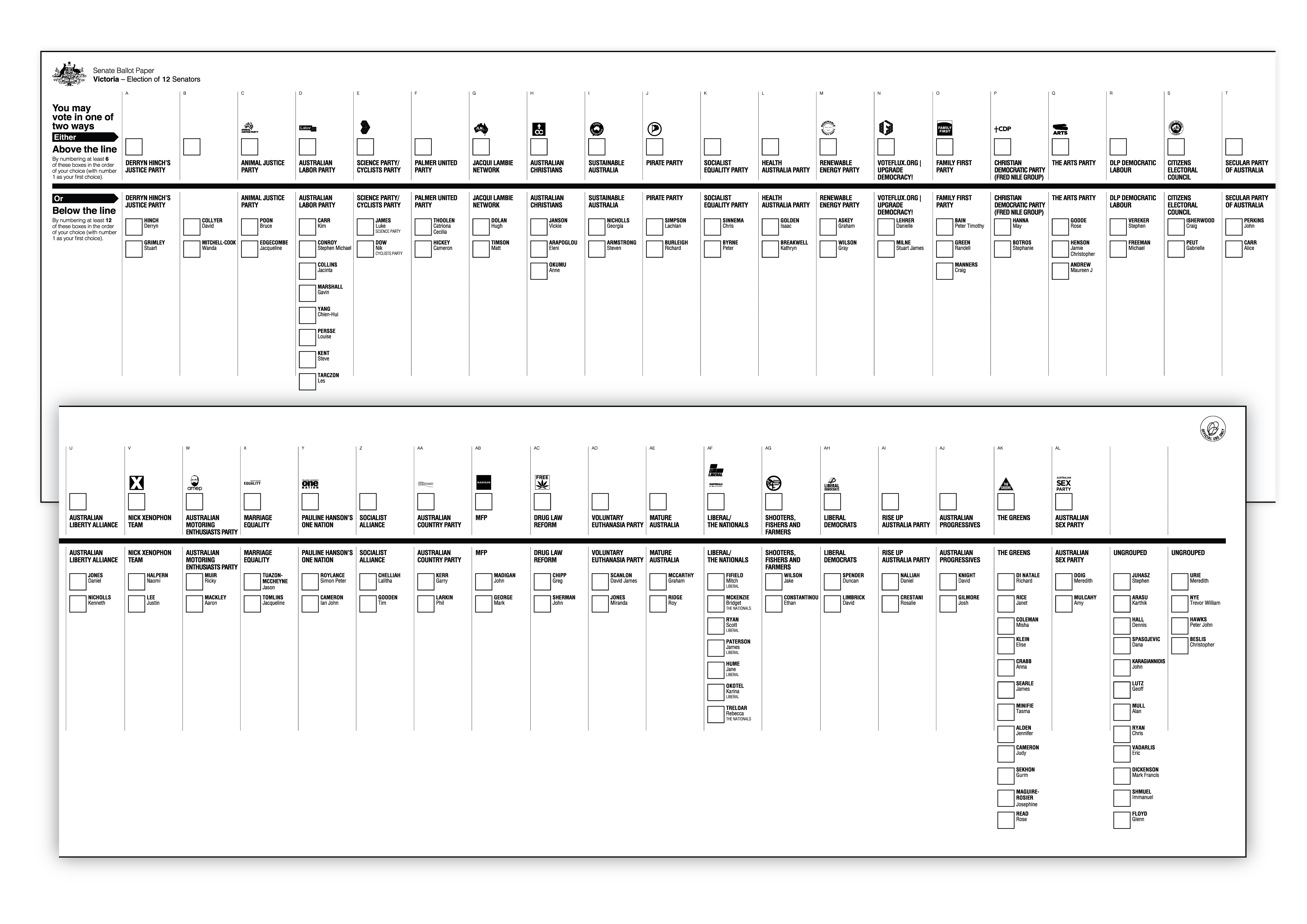
Senate ballot paper used in Victoria for 2016

To vote correctly, electors must either:

- Vote for at least six parties above the thick black line, by writing the numbers 1–6 in party boxes. Votes with fewer than six boxes numbered are still admitted to the count through savings provisions.
- Vote for at least twelve candidates below the thick black line, by writing the numbers 1–12 in the individual candidates' boxes. Votes with between six and twelve boxes numbered are still admitted to the count through savings provisions.

Because each state elects six senators at each half-Senate election, the quota for election is only one-seventh or 14.3% (one third or 33.3% for territories, where only two senators are elected). Once a candidate has been elected with votes reaching the quota amount, any votes they receive in addition to this may be distributed to other candidates as preferences, if there are still open seats to fill.

With an odd number of seats in a half-Senate election (three or five), 50.1% of the vote wins a majority (i.e. two or three respectively).

With an even number of seats in a half-Senate election (six), 57.1% of the vote is needed to win a majority of seats (four out of six).

The ungrouped candidates in the far right column do not have a box above the line. Therefore, they can only get a primary (number 1) vote from electors who vote below the line. For this reason, some independents register as a group, either with other independents or by themselves, such as group B in the above example.

Names of parties can be shown only if the parties are registered, which requires, among other things, a minimum of 1,500 members.

=== Order of parties ===
The order of parties on the ballot papers and the order of ungrouped candidates are determined by a random ballot conducted by the Australian Electoral Commission.

=== Deposit ===
Candidates, parties and groups pay a deposit of $2,000 per candidate, which is forfeited if they fail to achieve 4% of the primary vote.

=== Public subsidy ===
Candidates, parties and groups earn a public subsidy if they gain at least 4% of the primary vote. At the 2019 federal election, funding was $2.756 per formal first preference vote.

== Membership ==
Under sections 7 and 8 of the Australian Constitution:

- The Senate must comprise an equal number of senators from each original state,
- each original state shall have at least six senators, and
- the Senate must be elected in a way that is not discriminatory among the states.

These conditions have periodically been the source of debate, and within these conditions, the composition and rules of the Senate have varied significantly since federation.

=== Size and nexus ===
Under section 24 of the Constitution, the number of members of the House of Representatives has to be "as nearly as practicable" double the number of senators.

The reasons for the nexus are twofold: a desire to maintain a constant influence for the smaller states, and maintain a constant balance of the two Houses in the event of a joint sitting after a double dissolution. A referendum in 1967 to eliminate the nexus was rejected.

The size of the Senate has changed over the years. The Constitution originally provided for six senators for each state, resulting in a total of 36 senators.

The Constitution permits the Parliament to increase the number of senators, provided that equal numbers of senators from each original state are maintained; accordingly, in 1948, Senate representation was increased from 6 to 10 senators for each state, increasing the total to 60.

In 1975, the two territories, the Northern Territory and the Australian Capital Territory, were given an entitlement to elect two senators each for the first time, bringing the number to 64. The senators from the Northern Territory also represent constituents from Australia's Indian Ocean Territories (Christmas Island and the Cocos (Keeling) Islands), while the senators from the Australian Capital Territory also represent voters from the Jervis Bay Territory and since 1 July 2016, Norfolk Island.

The latest expansion in Senate numbers took place in 1984, when the number of senators from each state was increased from 10 to 12, resulting in a total of 76 senators.

=== Term ===
Senators normally serve fixed six-year terms (from 1 July to 30 June). At most federal elections, the seats of 40 of the 76 senators (half of the 72 senators from the six states and all four of the senators from the territories) are contested, along with the entire House of Representatives; such an election is sometimes known as a half-Senate election. The seats of senators representing states elected at a half-Senate election are not contested at the next election, provided it is a half-Senate election. However, under some circumstances, the entire Senate (and the House of Representatives) is dissolved, in what is known as a double dissolution. Following a double dissolution, half the senators representing states serve terms ending on the third 30 June following the election (two to three years) and the rest serve a five- to six-year term. Section 13 of the Constitution requires the Senate to allocate long and short terms amongst its members. The term of senators representing a territory expires at the same time as there is an election for the House of Representatives.

Section 13 of the Constitution requires that in half-Senate elections, the election of state senators shall take place within one year before the places become vacant. The actual election date is determined by the governor of each state, who acts on the advice of the state premier. The governors almost always act on the recommendation of the governor-general, with the last independent Senate election writ being issued by the governor of Queensland during the Gair Affair in 1974.

Slightly more than half of the Senate is contested at each general election (half of the 72 state senators, and all four of the territory senators), along with the entire House of Representatives. Except in the case of a double dissolution, senators for the states are elected for fixed terms of six years, commencing on 1 July following the election, and ceasing on 30 June six years later.

The term of the four senators from the territories is not fixed, but is defined by the dates of the general elections for the House of Representatives, the period between which can vary greatly, to a maximum of three years and three months. Territory senators commence their terms on the day that they are elected. Their terms expire the day prior to the following general election day.

While there is no constitutional requirement for the election of senators to take place at the same time as those for members of the House of Representatives, the government usually synchronises the dates of elections for the Senate and House of Representatives. However, because their terms do not coincide, the incoming Parliament may for some time comprise the new House of Representatives and the old Senate, except for the senators representing the territories, until the new senators start their term on the next 1 July.

Following a double dissolution, all 76 senators face re-election. If there is an early House election outside the 12-month period in which Senate elections can occur, the synchronisation of the election will be disrupted, and there can be half-Senate elections without a concurrent House election. The last time this occurred was on 21 November 1970.

=== Quota size ===
The number of votes that a candidate must receive to be elected to the senate is referred to as a "quota". The quota is worked out by dividing the number of formal votes by one more than the number of vacancies to be filled and then adding one to the result. The 2019 senate election was a half senate election, so 6 senate vacancies were contested in each state. At this election, the quotas in each state were:

State	2019 quota	% of the NSW 2019 quota	2016 double dissolution quota
NSW	670,761	100%	345,554
Vic	534,207	80%	269,250
Qld	414,495	62%	209,475
WA	206,661	31%	105,091
SA	156,404	23%	81,629
Tas	50,285	7%	26,090

=== Proportional representation of the states vs one vote one value ===
Each state elects the same number of senators, meaning there is equal representation for each of the Australian states, regardless of population, so the Senate, like many upper Houses, does not adhere to the principle of one vote one value. Tasmania, with a population of around 500,000, elects the same number of senators as New South Wales, which has a population of more than 8 million.

State/Territory/Commonwealth	2021 Census population	Population per senator
New South Wales	8,339,347	694,945
Victoria	6,503,491	541,957
Queensland	5,156,138	429,678
Western Australia	2,660,026	221,668
South Australia	1,781,516	148,459
Tasmania	557,571	46,464
Northern Territory (including Christmas Island and Cocos (Keeling) Islands)	234,890	117,445
Australian Capital Territory (including Jervis Bay Territory and Norfolk Island)	456,687	228,343
Australia	25,422,788	334,510

The proportional election system within each state ensures that the Senate incorporates more political diversity than the lower house (House of Representatives), which has historically been a two party body. The elected membership of the Senate more closely reflects the first voting preference of the electorate as a whole than does the composition of the House of Representatives, despite the large discrepancies from state to state in the ratio of voters to senators. This often means that the composition of the Senate is different from that of the House of Representatives, contributing to the Senate's function as a house of review.

With proportional representation, and the small majorities in the Senate compared to the generally larger majorities in the House of Representatives, and the requirement that the number of members of the House be "nearly as practicable" twice that of the Senate, a joint sitting after a double dissolution is more likely than not to lead to a victory for the House over the Senate. When the Senate had an odd number of senators retiring at an election (3 or 5), 51% of the vote would lead to a clear majority of 3 out of 5 per state. With an even number of senators retiring at an election, it takes 57% of the vote to win 4 out of 6 seats, which may be insurmountable. This gives the House an advantage in joint sittings but not in ordinary elections, where the Senate may be too evenly balanced to get House legislation through.

A party does not need the support of the Senate to form government (needing only a majority in the House of Representatives), however the Senate can block supply, effectively preventing the government from lawfully spending money. Whether a government facing a Senate that blocks supply is obliged to either resign or call an election was one of the major disputes of the 1975 constitutional crisis. However, even where the Senate does not block supply, they can still use their power to frustrate the legislative agenda of the government.

=== Parties ===
Political parties have played a major role in the operations of the Senate throughout its history. Some framers of the constitution intended that senators would give first priority to the interests of their states, placing state considerations above party interests. However, others involved in drafting the constitution – including Alfred Deakin, Isaac Isaacs, and H. B. Higgins – correctly predicted that party considerations would soon dominate state interests.

Party discipline was important in the Senate from the first parliament, most notably with the formation of an Australian Labor Party caucus after the inaugural 1901 election which required its members to vote in line with decisions of the majority. A two-party system became ensconced in both houses of parliament following the "fusion" of the non-Labor parties in 1909, largely as a response to the discipline of the ALP. Votes on party lines soon became a regular feature of debate, with corresponding criticisms that the Senate had merely become a rubber stamp for the government rather than filling the role of a states' house.

The "block" voting system used for the Senate prior to electoral reform in 1948 contributed to uneven party representation in the Senate, with the party securing the majority of votes in a state typically winning all that state's Senate seats. After the emergence of the two-party system, there were only two elections between 1910 and 1949 where the government formed in the House of Representatives did not also hold a majority in the Senate. In both cases (1913 and 1929) the government lasted only a single term. The system produced "extreme and wildly fluctuating results". On five occasions, the government won all available seats at half-Senate elections; consecutive landslide victories could resulted in the opposition being reduced to a handful of seats, such as when the ALP was reduced to a single Senate seat after the 1919 election. These outcomes, while still uncommon, led the Senate to be perceived as a weak institution serving as a rubber stamp and contributed to calls for reform.

The system of proportional representation passed in 1948 and implemented at the 1949 election resulted in a more even balance of party representation. A largely unintended consequence of the reforms was the emergence of minor parties as a political force in the Senate, ending a period of 40 years where every elected senator had been a member of either the ALP or the various anti-Labor parties. The first minor party to achieve prominence and obtain the balance of power in the Senate was the Democratic Labor Party (DLP), formed after the ALP split of 1955. The Australian Democrats and the Australian Greens have also held the balance of power at various points. This marked the start of a pattern of non-government control of the Senate, where neither the government nor the opposition held a majority of seats and the government was reliant on minor party and independent senators to pass legislation. Since 1962, the government has secured a Senate majority on only three occasions: after the 1975, 1977 and 2004 elections.

=== Casual vacancies ===
Section 15 of the Constitution provides that a casual vacancy of a State senator shall be filled by the State Parliament. If the previous senator was a member of a particular political party the replacement must come from the same party, but the State Parliament may choose not to fill the vacancy, in which case Section 11 requires the Senate to proceed regardless. If the State Parliament happens to be in recess when the vacancy occurs, the Constitution provides that the State Governor can appoint someone to fill the place until fourteen days after the State Parliament resumes sitting.

== Procedure ==
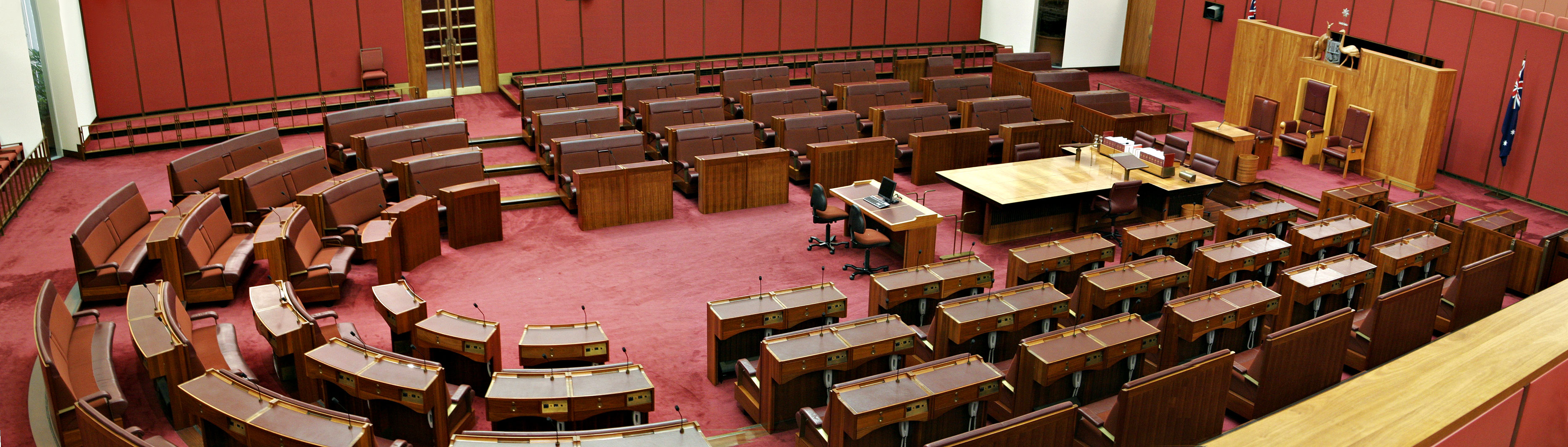
The Australian Senate

=== Work ===
The Australian Senate typically sits for 50 to 60 days a year. (Note: Figures are available for each year on the Senate StatsNet.) Most of those days are grouped into 'sitting fortnights' of two four-day weeks. These are in turn arranged in three periods: the autumn sittings, from February to April; the winter sittings, which commence with the delivery of the budget in the House of Representatives on the first sitting day of May and run through to June or July; and the spring sittings, which commence around August and continue until December, and which typically contain the largest number of the year's sitting days.

The senate has a regular schedule that structures its typical working week.

==== Dealing with legislation ====
All bills must be passed by a majority in both the House of Representatives and the Senate before they become law. Most bills originate in the House of Representatives, and the great majority are introduced by the government.

The usual procedure is for notice to be given by a government minister the day before the bill is introduced into the Senate. Once introduced the bill goes through several stages of consideration. It is given a first reading, which represents the bill's formal introduction into the chamber.

The first reading is followed by debate on the principle or policy of the bill (the second reading debate). Agreement to the bill in principle is indicated by a second reading, after which the detailed provisions of the bill are considered by one of a number of methods (see below). Bills may also be referred by either House to their specialised standing or select committees. Agreement to the policy and the details is confirmed by a third and final reading. These processes ensure that a bill is systematically considered before being agreed to.

The Senate has detailed rules in its standing orders that govern how a bill is considered at each stage. This process of consideration can vary greatly in the amount of time taken. Consideration of some bills is completed in a single day, while complex or controversial legislation may take months to pass through all stages of Senate scrutiny. The Constitution provides that if the Senate vote is equal, the question shall pass in the negative.

==== Committees ====
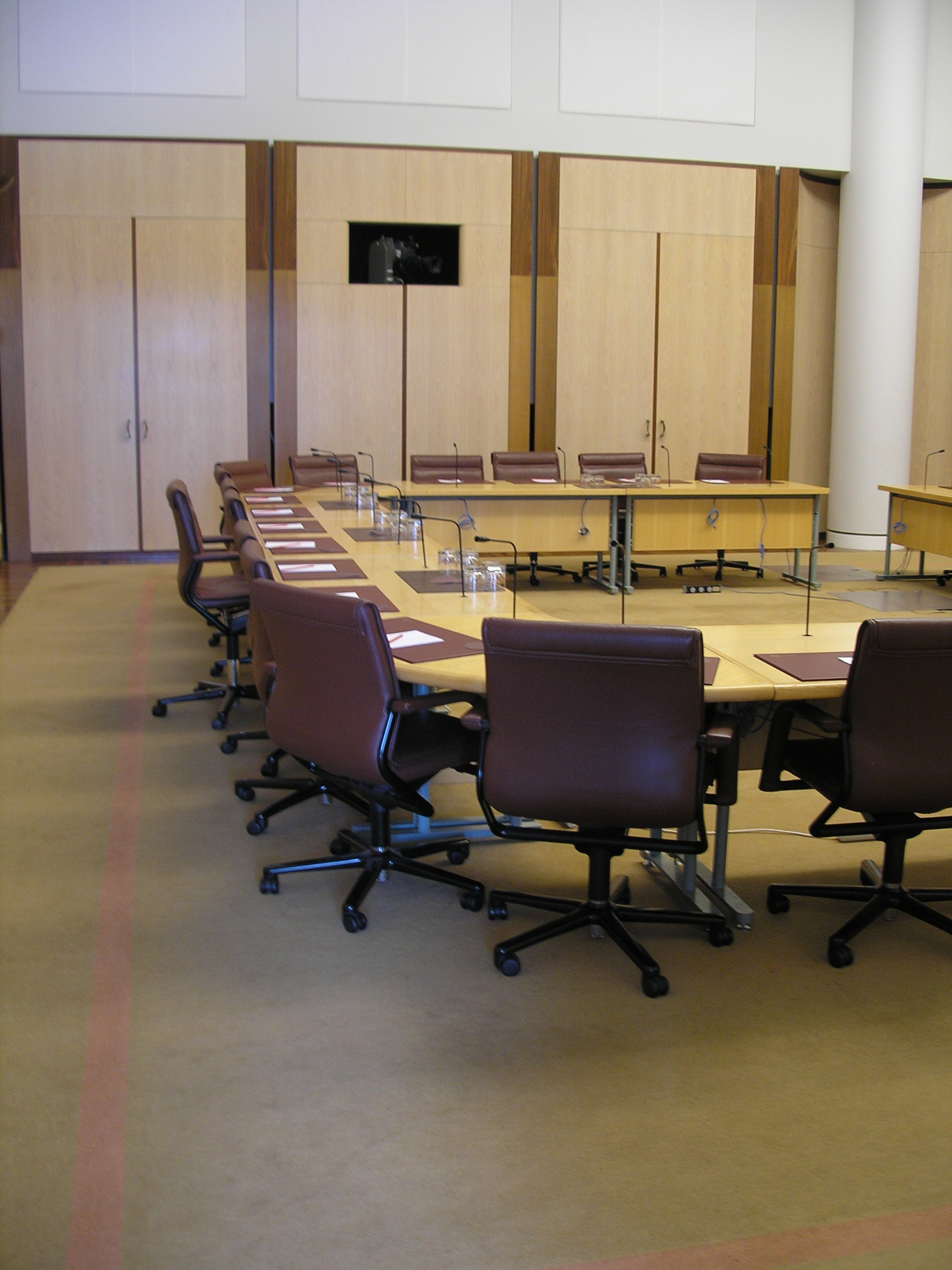
A Senate committee room in Parliament House, Canberra

A short video on Australian Parliamentary Committees

In addition to the work of the main chamber, the Senate also has a large number of committees which deal with matters referred to them by the Senate. These committees also conduct hearings three times a year in which the government's budget and operations are examined. These are known as estimates hearings. Traditionally dominated by scrutiny of government activities by non-government senators, they provide the opportunity for all senators to ask questions of ministers and public officials. This may occasionally include government senators examining activities of independent publicly funded bodies, or pursuing issues arising from previous governments' terms of office. There is however a convention that senators do not have access to the files and records of previous governments when there has been an election resulting in a change in the party in government. Once a particular inquiry is completed the members of the committee can then produce a report, to be tabled in Parliament, outlining what they have discovered as well as any recommendations that they have produced for the Government to consider.

The ability of the Houses of Parliament to establish committees is referenced in Section 49 of the Constitution, which states, "The powers, privileges, and immunities of the Senate and of the House of Representatives, and of the members and the committees of each House, shall be such as are declared by the Parliament, and until declared shall be those of the Commons House of Parliament of the United Kingdom, and of its members and committees, at the establishment of the Commonwealth."

Parliamentary committees can be given a wide range of powers. One of the most significant powers is the ability to summon people to attend hearings in order to give evidence and submit documents. Anyone who attempts to hinder the work of a Parliamentary committee may be found to be in contempt of Parliament. There are a number of ways that witnesses can be found in contempt, these include; refusing to appear before a committee when summoned, refusing to answer a question during a hearing or to produce a document, or later being found to have lied to or misled a committee. Anyone who attempts to influence a witness may also be found in contempt. Other powers include the ability to meet throughout Australia, to establish subcommittees and to take evidence in both public and private hearings.

Proceedings of committees are considered to have the same legal standing as proceedings of Parliament. They are recorded by Hansard, except for private hearings, and also operate under Parliamentary privilege. Every participant, including committee members and witnesses giving evidence, is protected from being prosecuted under any civil or criminal action for anything they may say during a hearing. Written evidence and documents received by a committee are also protected.

==== Holding governments to account ====
One of the functions of the Senate, both directly and through its committees, is to scrutinise government activity. The vigour of this scrutiny has been fuelled for many years by the fact that the party in government has seldom had a majority in the Senate. Whereas in the House of Representatives the government's majority has sometimes limited that chamber's capacity to implement executive scrutiny, the opposition and minor parties have been able to use their Senate numbers as a basis for conducting inquiries into government operations. When the Howard government won control of the Senate in 2005, it sparked a debate about the effectiveness of the Senate in holding the government of the day accountable for its actions. Government members argued that the Senate continued to be a forum of vigorous debate, and its committees continued to be active. The Opposition leader in the Senate suggested that the government had attenuated the scrutinising activities of the Senate. The Australian Democrats, a minor party which frequently played mediating and negotiating roles in the Senate, expressed concern about a diminished role for the Senate's committees.

In addition to review of legislation, the Legislation Act 2003 provides that the Senate may also disallow legislative instruments – typically regulations made by government ministers using powers delegated by relevant legislation. The same power is afforded to the House of Representatives, but is rarely exercised given the government's control of numbers in the lower house. The Legislation Act 2003 provides that any senator may move a motion disallowing a legislative instrument, which if passed within 15 days has the effect of repealing the instrument. The government may not enact an equivalent legislative instrument for a period of six months following the disallowal.

=== Voting ===
Senators are called upon to vote on matters before the Senate. These votes are called divisions in the case of Senate business, or ballots where the vote is to choose a senator to fill an office of the Senate (such as the President).

Party discipline in Australian politics is strong, so divisions almost always are decided on party lines. Nevertheless, the existence of minor parties holding the balance of power in the Senate has made divisions in that chamber more uncertain than in the House of Representatives.

When a division is to be held, bells ring throughout the parliament building for four minutes, during which time senators must go to the chamber. At the end of that period the doors are locked and a vote is taken, by identifying and counting senators according to the side of the chamber on which they sit (ayes to the right of the chair, noes to the left). The whole procedure takes around eight minutes. Senators with commitments that keep them from the chamber may make arrangements in advance to be 'paired' with a senator of the opposite political party, so that their absence does not affect the outcome of the vote.

The Senate contains an even number of senators, so a tied vote is a real prospect (which regularly occurs when the party numbers in the chamber are finely balanced). Section 23 of the Constitution requires that in the event of a tied division, the question is resolved in the negative. The system is however different for ballots for offices such as the President. If such a ballot is tied, the Clerk of the Senate decides the outcome by the drawing of lots. In reality, conventions govern most ballots, so this situation does not arise.

==== Political parties and voting outcomes ====
The strength of party discipline is demonstrated by how rare it is for members to vote against the position taken by their party. The exceptions are where a conscience vote is allowed by one or more of the political parties; and occasions where a member of a political party crosses the floor of the chamber to vote against the instructions of their party whip. Crossing the floor very rarely occurs, but is more likely in the Senate than in the House of Representatives.

When the government has a majority in the Senate, the importance of party discipline increases, as it is only backbenchers that may prevent the passage of government bills. While strong party discipline has been a feature of Australian politics since the emergence of the Labor Party in the early 1900s, as late as 1980 the Fraser government could not be assured that his party's majority in the Senate would translate to absolute control, with at least 12 senators prepared to vote against the government. Similarly, when the Howard government had a Senate majority between 2005 and 2007, the internal differences between members of the government coalition parties became more apparent. However, due to the increase in party discipline, only two senators in this period crossed the floor: Gary Humphries on civil unions in the Australian Capital Territory, and Barnaby Joyce on voluntary student unionism. A more significant potential instance of floor crossing was averted when the government withdrew its Migration Amendment (Designated Unauthorised Arrivals) Bill, of which several government senators had been critical, and which would have been defeated had it proceeded to the vote. The controversy that surrounded these examples demonstrated both the importance of backbenchers in party policy deliberations and the limitations to their power to influence outcomes in the Senate chamber.

In September 2008, Barnaby Joyce became leader of the Nationals in the Senate, and stated that his party in the upper house would no longer necessarily vote with their Liberal counterparts.

== Where the Houses disagree ==
=== Double dissolutions and joint sittings ===
If the Senate rejects or fails to pass a proposed law, or passes it with amendments to which the House of Representatives will not agree, and if after an interval of three months the Senate refuses to pass the same piece of legislation, the government may either abandon the bill or continue to revise it, or, in certain circumstances outlined in section 57 of the Constitution, the Prime Minister can advise the Governor-General to dissolve the entire parliament in a double dissolution. In such an event, the entirety of the Senate faces re-election, as does the House of Representatives, rather than only about half the chamber as is normally the case. After a double dissolution election, if the bills in question are reintroduced, and if they again fail to pass the Senate, the Governor-General may agree to a joint sitting of the two Houses in an attempt to pass the bills. Such a sitting has only occurred once, in 1974.

The double dissolution mechanism is not available for bills that originate in the Senate and are blocked in the lower house.

On 8 October 2003, the then Prime Minister John Howard initiated public discussion of whether the mechanism for the resolution of deadlocks between the Houses should be reformed. High levels of support for the existing mechanism, and a very low level of public interest in that discussion, resulted in the abandonment of these proposals.

=== Allocating terms after a double dissolution ===
After a double dissolution election, section 13 of the Constitution requires the Senate to divide the senators into two classes, with the first class having a three-year "short term", and the second class a six-year "long term". The Senate may adopt any approach it wants to determine how to allocate the long and short terms, however two methods are currently 'on the table':

- "elected-order" method, where the senators elected first attain a six-year term. This approach tends to favour minor party candidates as it gives greater weight to their first preference votes; or
- re-count method, where the long terms are allocated to those senators who would have been elected first if the election had been a standard half-Senate election. This method is likely to be preferred by the major parties in the Senate where it would deliver more six-year terms to their members.

The Senate applied the "elected-order" method following the 1987 double dissolution election. Since that time the Senate has passed resolutions on several occasions indicating its intention to use the re-count method to allocate seats at any future double dissolution, which Green describes as a fairer approach but notes could be ignored if a majority of senators opted for the "elected-order" method instead. In both double dissolution elections since 1987, the "elected order" method was used.

== Blocking supply ==
The Senate has the same legislative power as the House of Representatives, except it may not originate or amend taxing or appropriation bills; they may only pass or reject them. The ability to block the annual appropriations bills required to fund the government ("supply") was exercised in the 1975 Australian constitutional crisis. During the crisis, the Opposition used its numbers in the Senate to defer supply bills, refusing to deal with them until an election was called for both Houses of Parliament, an election which it hoped to win. The Prime Minister of the day, Gough Whitlam, contested the legitimacy of the blocking and refused to resign. The crisis brought to a head two Westminster conventions that, under the Australian constitutional system, were in conflict – firstly, that a government may continue to govern for as long as it has the support of the lower house, and secondly, that a government that no longer has access to supply must either resign or be dismissed. The deadlock ended in November 1975 when Governor-General Sir John Kerr dismissed Whitlam's government and appointed Opposition Leader Fraser as Prime Minister, on the condition that elections for both Houses of parliament be held.

In 2014, ABC elections analyst Antony Green noted that the blocking of supply alone cannot force a double dissolution. There must be legislation repeatedly blocked by the Senate which the government can then choose to use as a trigger for a double dissolution.

== Current Senate ==
State	Seats held
New South Wales	
Victoria	
Queensland	
Western Australia	
South Australia	
Tasmania	
Australian Capital Territory	
Northern Territory	

=== 2022 election ===
In the 2022 half-Senate election, 40 seats were up for election: six from each state and two from each territory. The senate results were: Liberal/National coalition 15 seats (−4), Labor 15 seats (±0), Greens 6 seats (+3), Jacqui Lambie Network 1 seat (+1), One Nation 1 seat (±0), United Australia 1 seat (+1), and independent 1 seat (+1). The composition of the Senate after the election was:

- Liberal/National Coalition 32 seats
- Labor 26 seats
- Greens 12 seats
- Jacqui Lambie Network 2 seats
- One Nation 2 seats
- United Australia 1 seat
- Independent (David Pocock) 1 seat

=== 2025 election ===
In the 2025 half-senate election, 40 seats were up for election: six from each state and two from each territory. The senate results were: Liberal/National coalition 13 seats (−3), Labor 16 seats (+3) Greens 6 seats (±0), One Nation 3 seats (+2), Jacqui Lambie Network (±0), and Independent (±0). Following the election, senator Dorinda Cox switched from Greens to Labor. The composition of the Senate after the election was:

- Labor: 29 seats
- Liberal/National Coalition: 27 seats
- Greens 10 seats
- One Nation: 4 seats
- United Australia: 1 seat
- Jacqui Lambie Network: 1 seat
- Australia's Voice: 1 seat
- Independent: 3 seats

On 14 May 2026, independent Senator Tammy Tyrrell joined Labor, increasing Labor's representation to 30.

== Historical party composition of the Senate ==
The Senate has included representatives from a range of political parties, including several parties that have seldom or never had representation in the House of Representatives, but which have consistently secured a small but significant level of electoral support, as the table shows.

Results represent the composition of the Senate after the elections. The full Senate has been contested on eight occasions; the inaugural election and seven double dissolutions. These are highlighted in puce.

Election Year		ALP Labor	LIB Liberal (Note: Includes results for the Free Trade Party for 1901 and 1903, the Anti-Socialist Party for 1906, the Commonwealth Liberal Party for 1910—1914, the Nationalist Party for 1917—1929, and the United Australia Party for 1931—1943.)		NAT National (Note: Includes results for the Country Party for 1919—1974 and the National Country Party for 1975—1980.)	DLP Labor DLP	DEM Democrats	GRN Greens	CLP CLP	IND Independent	Other parties		Total seats	Electoral system
Election Year		ALP Labor	LIB Liberal		NAT National	DLP Labor DLP	DEM Democrats	GRN Greens	CLP CLP	IND Independent	Name	Seats	Total seats	Electoral system
1st	1901	8	11 (Note: Protectionist Party)	17	—N/a	—N/a	—N/a	—N/a	—N/a	—N/a	—N/a	—N/a	36	(Note: Plurality-at-large voting)
2nd	1903	8	12	14	—N/a	—N/a	—N/a	—N/a	—N/a	1	Revenue Tariff	1	36	
3rd	1906	15	6	13	—N/a	—N/a	—N/a	—N/a	—N/a	2	—N/a	—N/a	36	
4th	1910	22	14		—N/a	—N/a	—N/a	—N/a	—N/a	—N/a	—N/a	—N/a	36	
5th	1913	29	7		—N/a	—N/a	—N/a	—N/a	—N/a	—N/a	—N/a	—N/a	36	
6th	1914	31	5		—N/a	—N/a	—N/a	—N/a	—N/a	—N/a	—N/a	—N/a	36	
7th	1917	12	24		—N/a	—N/a	—N/a	—N/a	—N/a	—N/a	—N/a	—N/a	36	
8th	1919	1	35		—N/a	—N/a	—N/a	—N/a	—N/a	—N/a	—N/a	—N/a	36	(Note: Preferential block voting)
9th	1922	12	24		—N/a	—N/a	—N/a	—N/a	—N/a	—N/a	—N/a	—N/a	36	
10th	1925	8	25		3	—N/a	—N/a	—N/a	—N/a	—N/a	—N/a	—N/a	36	
11th	1928	7	24		5	—N/a	—N/a	—N/a	—N/a	—N/a	—N/a	—N/a	36	
12th	1931	10	21		5	—N/a	—N/a	—N/a	—N/a	—N/a	—N/a	—N/a	36	
13th	1934	3	26		7	—N/a	—N/a	—N/a	—N/a	—N/a	—N/a	—N/a	36	
14th	1937	16	16		4	—N/a	—N/a	—N/a	—N/a	—N/a	—N/a	—N/a	36	
15th	1940	17	15		4	—N/a	—N/a	—N/a	—N/a	—N/a	—N/a	—N/a	36	
16th	1943	22	12		2	—N/a	—N/a	—N/a	—N/a	—N/a	—N/a	—N/a	36	
17th	1946	33	2		1	—N/a	—N/a	—N/a	—N/a	—N/a	—N/a	—N/a	36	
18th	1949	34	21		5	—N/a	—N/a	—N/a	—N/a	—N/a	—N/a	—N/a	60	
19th	1951	28	26		6	—N/a	—N/a	—N/a	—N/a	—N/a	—N/a	—N/a	60	(Note: Single transferable vote)
20th	1953	29	26		5	—N/a	—N/a	—N/a	—N/a	—N/a	—N/a	—N/a	60	
21st	1955	28	24		6	2	—N/a	—N/a	—N/a	—N/a	—N/a	—N/a	60	
22nd	1958	26	25		7	2	—N/a	—N/a	—N/a	—N/a	—N/a	—N/a	60	
23rd	1961	28	24		6	1	—N/a	—N/a	—N/a	1	—N/a	—N/a	60	
24th	1964	27	23		7	2	—N/a	—N/a	—N/a	1	—N/a	—N/a	60	
25th	1967	27	21		7	4	—N/a	—N/a	—N/a	1	—N/a	—N/a	60	
26th	1970	26	21		5	5	—N/a	—N/a	—N/a	3	—N/a	—N/a	60	
27th	1974	29	23		6	—N/a	—N/a	—N/a	—N/a	1	Liberal Movement	1	60	
28th	1975	27	26		8	—N/a	—N/a	—N/a	1	1	Liberal Movement	1	64	
29th	1977	27	27		6	—N/a	2	—N/a	1	1	—N/a	—N/a	64	
30th	1980	27	27		3	—N/a	5	—N/a	1	1	—N/a	—N/a	64	
31st	1983	30	23		4	—N/a	5	—N/a	1	1	—N/a	—N/a	64	
32nd	1984	34	27		5	—N/a	7	—N/a	1	1	Nuclear Disarmament	1	76	(Note: Preferential block voting (Group voting ticket))
33rd	1987	32	26		7	—N/a	7	—N/a	1	2	Nuclear Disarmament	1	76	
34th	1990	32	28		5	—N/a	8	—N/a	1	1	Greens (WA)	1	76	
35th	1993	30	29		6	—N/a	7	—N/a	1	1	Greens (WA)	2	76	
36th	1996	29	31		5	—N/a	7	—N/a	1	1	Greens (WA)	1	76	
36th	1996	29	31		5	—N/a	7	—N/a	1	1	Greens (Tas)	1	76	
36th	1996	29	31		5	—N/a	7	—N/a	1	1	Total	2	76	
37th	1998	29	31		3	—N/a	9	1	1	1	One Nation	1	76	
38th	2001	28	31		3	—N/a	8	2	1	2	One Nation	1	76	
39th	2004	28	33		5	—N/a	4	4	1	—N/a	Family First	1	76	
40th	2007	32	32		4	—N/a	—N/a	5	1	1	Family First	1	76	
41st	2010	31	28 (+3 LNP)		2	1	—N/a	9	1	1	—N/a	—N/a	76	
42nd	2013	25	23 (+5 LNP)		3 (+1 LNP)	1	—N/a	10	1	1	Family First	1	76	
42nd	2013	25	23 (+5 LNP)		3 (+1 LNP)	1	—N/a	10	1	1	Liberal Democrats	1	76	
42nd	2013	25	23 (+5 LNP)		3 (+1 LNP)	1	—N/a	10	1	1	Motoring Enthusiast	1	76	
42nd	2013	25	23 (+5 LNP)		3 (+1 LNP)	1	—N/a	10	1	1	Palmer United	3	76	
42nd	2013	25	23 (+5 LNP)		3 (+1 LNP)	1	—N/a	10	1	1	Total	6	76	
43rd	2016	26	21 (+3 LNP)		3 (+2 LNP)	—N/a	—N/a	9	1	—N/a	Family First	1	76	(Note: Single transferable vote (Optional preferential voting))
43rd	2016	26	21 (+3 LNP)		3 (+2 LNP)	—N/a	—N/a	9	1	—N/a	Liberal Democrats	1	76	(Note: Single transferable vote (Optional preferential voting))
43rd	2016	26	21 (+3 LNP)		3 (+2 LNP)	—N/a	—N/a	9	1	—N/a	Jacqui Lambie	1	76	(Note: Single transferable vote (Optional preferential voting))
43rd	2016	26	21 (+3 LNP)		3 (+2 LNP)	—N/a	—N/a	9	1	—N/a	Justice Party	1	76	(Note: Single transferable vote (Optional preferential voting))
43rd	2016	26	21 (+3 LNP)		3 (+2 LNP)	—N/a	—N/a	9	1	—N/a	Nick Xenophon Team	3	76	(Note: Single transferable vote (Optional preferential voting))
43rd	2016	26	21 (+3 LNP)		3 (+2 LNP)	—N/a	—N/a	9	1	—N/a	One Nation	4	76	(Note: Single transferable vote (Optional preferential voting))
43rd	2016	26	21 (+3 LNP)		3 (+2 LNP)	—N/a	—N/a	9	1	—N/a	Total	11	76	(Note: Single transferable vote (Optional preferential voting))
44th	2019	26	26 (+4 LNP)		2 (+2 LNP)	—N/a	—N/a	9	1	1	Jacqui Lambie	1	76	
44th	2019	26	26 (+4 LNP)		2 (+2 LNP)	—N/a	—N/a	9	1	1	Centre Alliance	2	76	
44th	2019	26	26 (+4 LNP)		2 (+2 LNP)	—N/a	—N/a	9	1	1	One Nation	2	76	
44th	2019	26	26 (+4 LNP)		2 (+2 LNP)	—N/a	—N/a	9	1	1	Total	5	76	
45th	2022	26	23 (+5 LNP)		3	—N/a	—N/a	12	1	1	United Australia	1	76	(Note: Single transferable vote (Proportional representation))
45th	2022	26	23 (+5 LNP)		3	—N/a	—N/a	12	1	1	Jacqui Lambie	2	76	(Note: Single transferable vote (Proportional representation))
45th	2022	26	23 (+5 LNP)		3	—N/a	—N/a	12	1	1	One Nation	2	76	(Note: Single transferable vote (Proportional representation))
45th	2022	26	23 (+5 LNP)		3	—N/a	—N/a	12	1	1	Total	5	76	(Note: Single transferable vote (Proportional representation))
46th	2025	28	26		9	—N/a	—N/a	11	1	4	Jacqui Lambie	1	76	
46th	2025	28	26		9	—N/a	—N/a	11	1	4	United Australia	1	76	
46th	2025	28	26		9	—N/a	—N/a	11	1	4	Australia's Voice	1	76	
46th	2025	28	26		9	—N/a	—N/a	11	1	4	People First	1	76	
46th	2025	28	26		9	—N/a	—N/a	11	1	4	One Nation	2	76	
46th	2025	28	26		9	—N/a	—N/a	11	1	4	Total	6	76	

== See also ==
- 2025 Australian federal election
- Canberra Press Gallery
- Clerk of the Australian Senate
- Double dissolution
- Expansion of the Australian Parliament
- Father of the Australian Senate
- List of Australian Senate appointments
- Members of the Australian Parliament who have served for at least 30 years
- Members of the Australian Senate, 2025–2028
- Women in the Australian Senate
