= Section 24 of the Constitution of Australia =

Section 24 of the Constitution of Australia is titled "Constitution of House of Representatives". It provides that the House of Representatives be "directly chosen by the people of the Commonwealth" and have roughly twice as many seats as the Senate. A High Court ruling in 1977 clarified that the provision applies to States only. A provision for Territories is instead provided by legislation passed in Parliament in accordance with Section 122 of the Constitution.

The section also provides a formula for the number of seats in each State, subject to later amendment by the parliament, and guarantees at least five members for each original State.

== Text ==
The House of Representatives shall be composed of members directly chosen by the people of the Commonwealth, and the number of such members shall be, as nearly as practicable, twice the number of the senators.

The number of members chosen in the several States shall be in proportion to the respective numbers of their people, and shall, until the Parliament otherwise provides, be determined, whenever necessary, in the following manner:
(i) a quota shall be ascertained by dividing the number of the people of the Commonwealth, as shown by the latest statistics of the Commonwealth, by twice the number of the senators;
(ii) the number of members to be chosen in each State shall be determined by dividing the number of the people of the State, as shown by the latest statistics of the Commonwealth, by the quota; and if on such division there is a remainder greater than one-half of the quota, one more member shall be chosen in the State.

But notwithstanding anything in this section, five members at least shall be chosen in each Original State.

== Provisions and interpretations ==
=== "Directly chosen" clause ===
Section 24 provides that members of the House of Representatives be "directly chosen by the people of the Commonwealth". A similar clause is found in section 7 relating to the election of senators.

In Attorney-General (Cth) ex rel. McKinlay v Commonwealth (1975), the High Court of Australia found that the two "directly chosen" clauses do not necessitate a universal adult suffrage or require electorates of equal size ("one vote, one value").

In Lange v Australian Broadcasting Corporation (1997), the High Court held that:

Freedom of communication on matters of government and politics is an indispensable incident of that system of government which the Constitution creates by directing that the members of the House of Representatives and the Senate shall be ‘directly chosen by the people’ of the Commonwealth and the States.

In Roach v Electoral Commissioner (2007), which considered the voting rights of prisoners, Chief Justice Murray Gleeson observed in obiter that "the words of ss 7 and 24, because of changed historical circumstances including legislative history, have come to be a constitutional protection of the right to vote". Justices William Gummow, Michael Kirby and Susan Crennan did not endorse a constitutional right to vote but held that sections 7 and 24 do not allow for disproportionate restrictions on the right to vote.

It has been suggested that sections 7 and 24 would form an impediment to the introduction of reserved seats for Indigenous Australians.

=== Nexus clause ===
Section 24 contains what is referred to as the "nexus clause", which provides that the number of members of the House of Representatives "shall be, as nearly as practicable, twice the number of the senators". In reality, the number of House of Representative members can never be exactly twice the number of senators due to the minimum five senators per Original State clause, which guarantees five seats to Tasmania, more than what would have been calculated from the Section.

The nexus clause has the effect of giving the House of Representatives, which is the representative of the most recent will of the people, additional weight in the event of a joint sitting after a double dissolution. However since the acceptance of full voting members in Parliament from the mainland Territories, the nexus no longer guarantees a relationship between the size of the House and the Senate and in particular '[once Territories are accorded representation the nexus requirement will no longer necessarily dictate the strengths of the two chambers when meeting together in joint sittings'.

It also has the effect of requiring any substantive increase in the House (to accommodate population growth) to be accompanied by an increase in the number of Senators. One of the framers of the Constitution, Edmund Barton, claimed the nexus was 'an essential of Federation' in that it protected the relative size and status of the Senate.

It has been noted that the nexus clause is one of the few clauses unique to the Australian Constitution, in that it has no identified precedent in other jurisdictions. Its inclusion was "hotly debated" and it has "since become a significant obstacle to any expansion of the size of parliament".

In 1967, the Holt government submitted to a referendum a proposal to amend the constitution to abolish the nexus clause, which however was carried by a majority in only one state. The 1975 Constitutional Convention and the 1988 Constitutional Committee also supported the removal of the clause.

=== "Number of senators" and "people of the Commonwealth" ===
In Attorney-General (NSW) ex rel. McKellar v Commonwealth (1977), the High Court ruled that the "number of senators" in Section 24 refers to only the number of State senators and cannot include the number of Territory senators. The same case also ruled that the "people of the Commonwealth" only includes people in the States excludes people in the Territories. These rulings were later incorporated in legislation (Commonwealth Electoral Act 1918) for the purpose of determining entitlements to House of Representatives seats.

=== Apportionment ===
The section sets out the manner in which the number of members in each state and territory is to be determined. However, it also provides that that method shall apply "until the Parliament otherwise provides", which the Parliament has provided. The current apportionment method is described in section 48 of the Commonwealth Electoral Act 1918, and is still consistent with Section 24 of the Constitution.
