= Australian House of Representatives =

Lower house of the Parliament of Australia

Coordinates: 35°18′31″S 149°07′30″E

House of Representatives
- 48th Parliament of Australia
- Commonwealth Coat of Arms

Type
- Type: Lower house of the Parliament of Australia

Leadership
- Speaker: Milton Dick, Labor since 26 July 2022
- Prime Minister: Anthony Albanese, Labor since 23 May 2022
- Leader of the House: Tony Burke, Labor since 1 June 2022
- Leader of the Opposition: Angus Taylor, Liberal since 13 February 2026
- Manager of Opposition Business: Dan Tehan, Liberal since 17 February 2026

Structure
- Seats: 150
- Political groups: Government (94): Labor (94); Opposition (41); Coalition: Liberal (27) (Note: Including 10 Liberal National Party of Queensland (LNP) MPs who sit in the Liberal party room); National (14) (Note: Including 6 Liberal National Party of Queensland (LNP) MPs who sit in the National party room); Crossbench (15): One Nation (2); Community Strong (2); Greens (1); Katter's Australian (1); Centre Alliance (1); Independent (8) (Note: Nicolette Boele (Bradfield, NSW); Kate Chaney (Curtin, WA); Andrew Gee (Calare, NSW); Helen Haines (Indi, Vic); Dai Le (Fowler, NSW); Monique Ryan (Kooyong, Vic); Sophie Scamps (Mackellar, NSW); Andrew Wilkie (Clark, TAS))
- Length of term: 3 years

Elections
- Voting system: Full preferential voting
- Last election: 3 May 2025
- Next election: By 23 September 2028

Meeting place
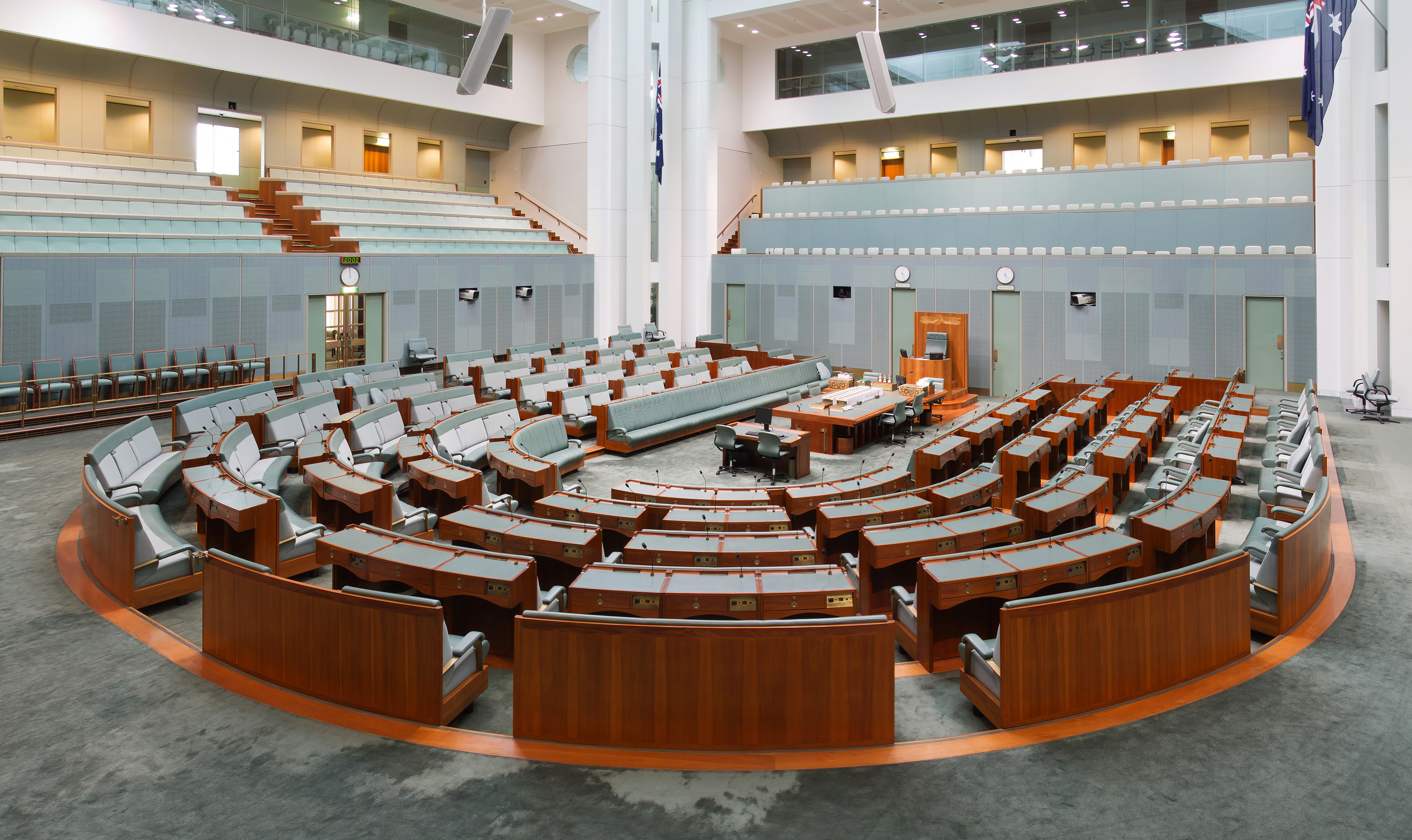
- House of Representatives Chamber; Parliament House; Canberra, Australian Capital Territory; Australia

Website
- House of Representatives

The House of Representatives is a chamber of the bicameral Parliament of Australia; it is the lower house, with the upper house being the Senate. The powers, role and composition of the House are set out in Chapter I of the Constitution of Australia as well as federal legislation and constitutional convention.

The term of members of the House of Representatives is a maximum of three years from the date of the first sitting of the House, but on only one occasion since Federation has the maximum term been reached. The House is almost always dissolved earlier, usually alone but sometimes in a double dissolution alongside the whole Senate. Elections for members of the House of Representatives have always been held in conjunction with those for the Senate since the 1970s.

A member of the House may be referred to as a "Member of Parliament" ("MP" or "Member"), while a member of the Senate is usually referred to as a "senator". Under the conventions of the Westminster system, the government of the day and the prime minister must achieve and maintain the confidence of this House in order to gain and remain in power.

The House of Representatives currently consists of 150 members, elected by and representing single member districts known as electoral divisions (commonly referred to as "electorates" or "seats"). The number of members is not fixed but can vary with boundary changes resulting from electoral redistributions, which are required on a regular basis. Prior to the 1984 election, the number of members increased from 125 to 148. It was reduced to 147 for the 1993 election, returned to 148 for the 1996 election, increased to 150 for the 2001 election, and stood at 151 for the 2022 Australian federal election. The 2025 election saw 150 seats contested.

The House of Representatives chamber is designed to seat up to 172 members, with provision for an ultimate total of 240 to be accommodated.

Each division elects one member using full-preferential voting. This voting system was put in place after the 1918 Swan by-election, which Labor unexpectedly won when two conservative parties of that era split a substantially larger conservative (and anti-Labor) vote between themselves. The Nationalist government of the time changed the lower house voting system from first-past-the-post to full-preferential voting, effective from the 1919 general election.

== Origins and role ==
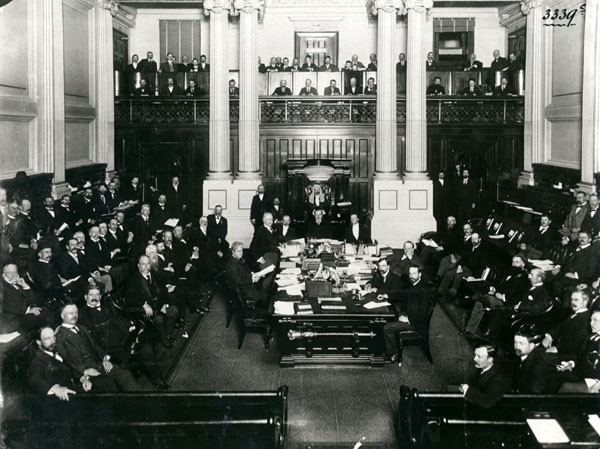
The Australian House of Representatives in 1901

The Constitution of Australia of 1900 established the House of Representatives in a newly federated Australia. The House is presided over by the speaker. Members of the House are elected from single member electorates (geographic districts, commonly referred to as "seats" but officially known as "Divisions of the Australian House of Representatives").

One vote, one value legislation requires all electorates within each state to have approximately the same number of voters. In 2022 there was an average of just over 117,000 electors per seat. However, the baseline quota for the number of voters in an electorate is determined by the number of voters in the state in which that electorate is found. The electorates of the smallest states and territories tend to have more variation from the mean in terms of numbers of electors. Each state is guaranteed a minimum of five seats in the Constitution, which has the effect of granting Tasmania more seats than they would otherwise be entitled to due to their population size. Federal electorates have their boundaries redrawn or redistributed whenever a state or territory has its number of seats adjusted, if electorates are not generally matched by population size or if seven years have passed since the most recent redistribution. Full preferential voting is used in elections. A full allocation of preferences is required for a vote to be considered formal. This allows for a calculation of the two-party-preferred vote.

Under section 24 of the Constitution, each state is entitled to members based on a population quota determined from the "latest statistics of the Commonwealth". These statistics arise from the census conducted under the auspices of section 51(xi). Until its repeal by the 1967 referendum, section 127 prohibited the inclusion of Aboriginal people in section 24 determinations as including the Indigenous peoples could alter the distribution of seats between the states to the benefit of states with larger Aboriginal populations.

The total number of seats representing states in the House of Representatives must be "as nearly as practicable, twice the number of the senators", according to section 24 of the Constitution. This requirement is known as the "nexus provision". This requirement was included in the Constitution in order to maintain the power of the Senate relative to the House of Representative: both due to the belief by the drafters of the Constitution that a numerically weaker Senate would inherently lead to a lower "influence, prestige, and dignity" and to ensure the influence of the Senate in case of a joint sitting after a double dissolution. Another reason was to make it harder politically for the House of Representatives to be increased, thereby maintaining the smaller states over representation in the lower house due to their constitutional minimum of five seats. The requirements for territory seats are set via legislation, which currently requires that the Australian Capital Territory and the Northern Territory have at least one member each.

According to the Australian Constitution, the powers of both Houses are nearly equal, with the consent of both Houses needed to pass legislation. The difference mostly relates to taxation legislation. In practice, by convention, the person who can control a majority of votes in the lower house is invited by the governor-general to form the government. The leader of that party (or coalition of parties) becomes the prime minister, who then can nominate other elected members of the government party in both the House and the Senate to become ministers responsible for various portfolios and administer government departments.

Bills appropriating money (supply bills) can only be introduced or amended in the lower house and thus only the party with a majority in the lower house can govern. In the current Australian party system, virtually all contentious votes are along party lines, with relatively few members crossing the floor to vote against their party's position; thus the party able to form government usually has a majority and is able to reliably win votes in the lower house.

The opposition party's main roles in the House are to present arguments against the government's policies and legislation where appropriate, and to attempt to hold the government accountable as much as possible by asking questions of ministers during question time and during debates on motions and legislation.

The preferential voting system of the lower house has resulted in a single party or coalition almost always having a majority of seats in the chamber. After the first decade of Federation, the only time when this did not occur was following the 1940 and 2010 elections. By contrast, the only period in recent times during which the government of the day has had a majority in the Senate was from July 2005 (when the senators elected at the 2004 election took their seats) to December 2007 (when the Rudd government was sworn in after winning the 2007 election). Hence, results of votes in the Senate are usually more contested and closely watched.

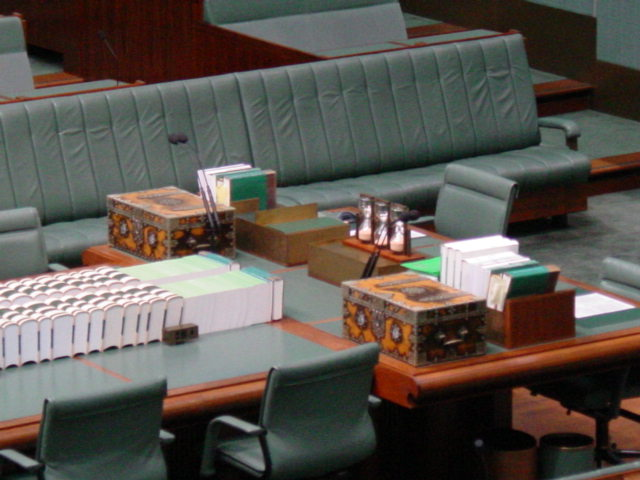
Frontbench and despatch box

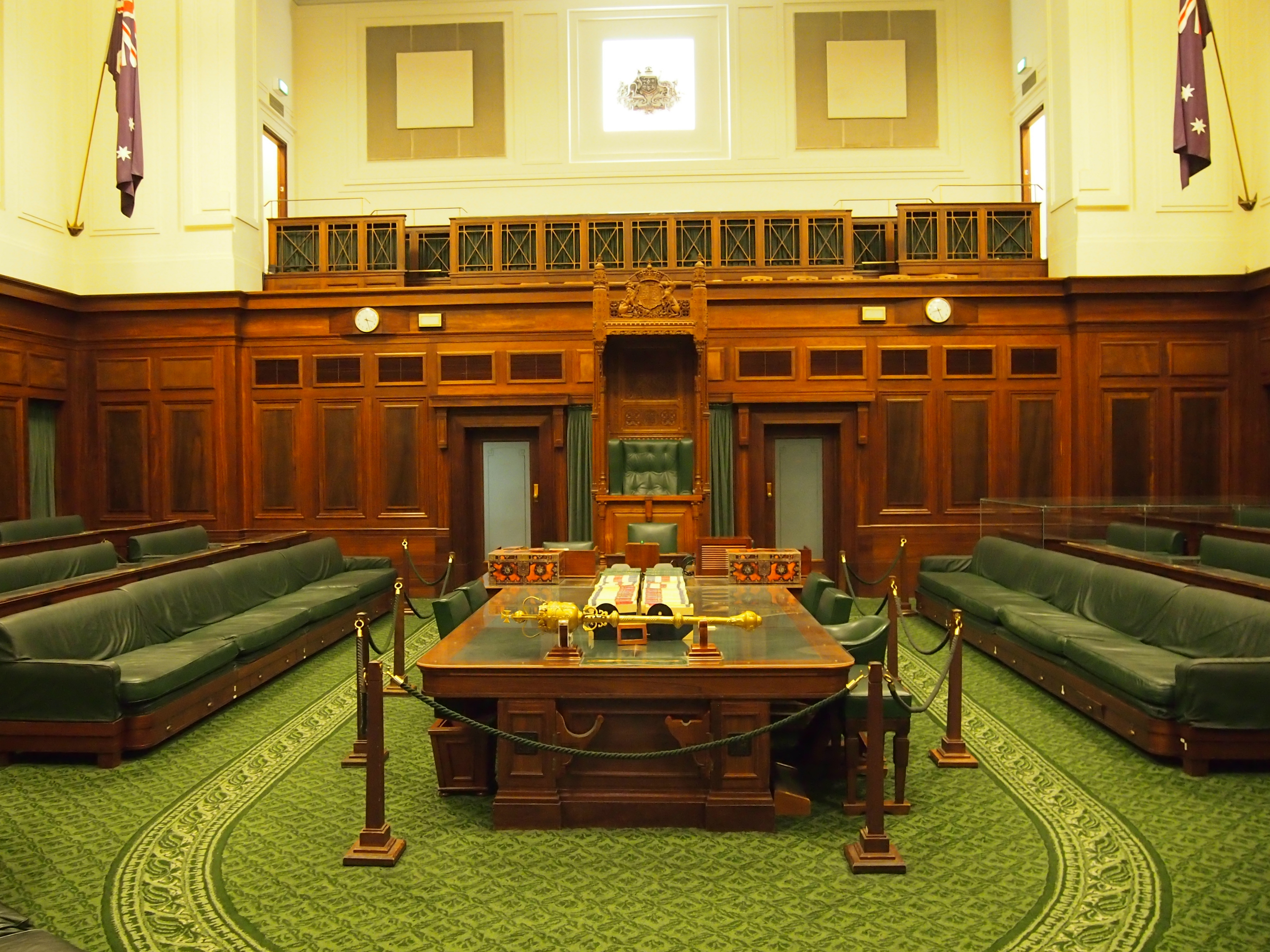
The House of Representatives chamber at Old Parliament House, Canberra, where the Parliament met between 1927 and 1988

In a reflection of the United Kingdom House of Commons, the predominant colour of the furnishings in the House of Representatives is green. However, the colour was lightened and given a uniquely Australian cast in the new Parliament House (opened 1988), suggesting the colour of eucalyptus tree leaves. Also, unlike the House of Commons, the seating arrangement of the crossbench is horse-shoe shaped, a hybrid of oppositional arrangements of the House of Commons and hemicycle arrangements preferred by legislatures of in Europe and the United States.

Australian parliaments are notoriously rowdy, with MPs often trading colourful insults. As a result, the speaker frequently has to use the disciplinary powers vested in them under standing orders.

Since 2015, Australian Federal Police officers armed with assault rifles have been present in both chambers of the federal Parliament.

== Electoral system ==
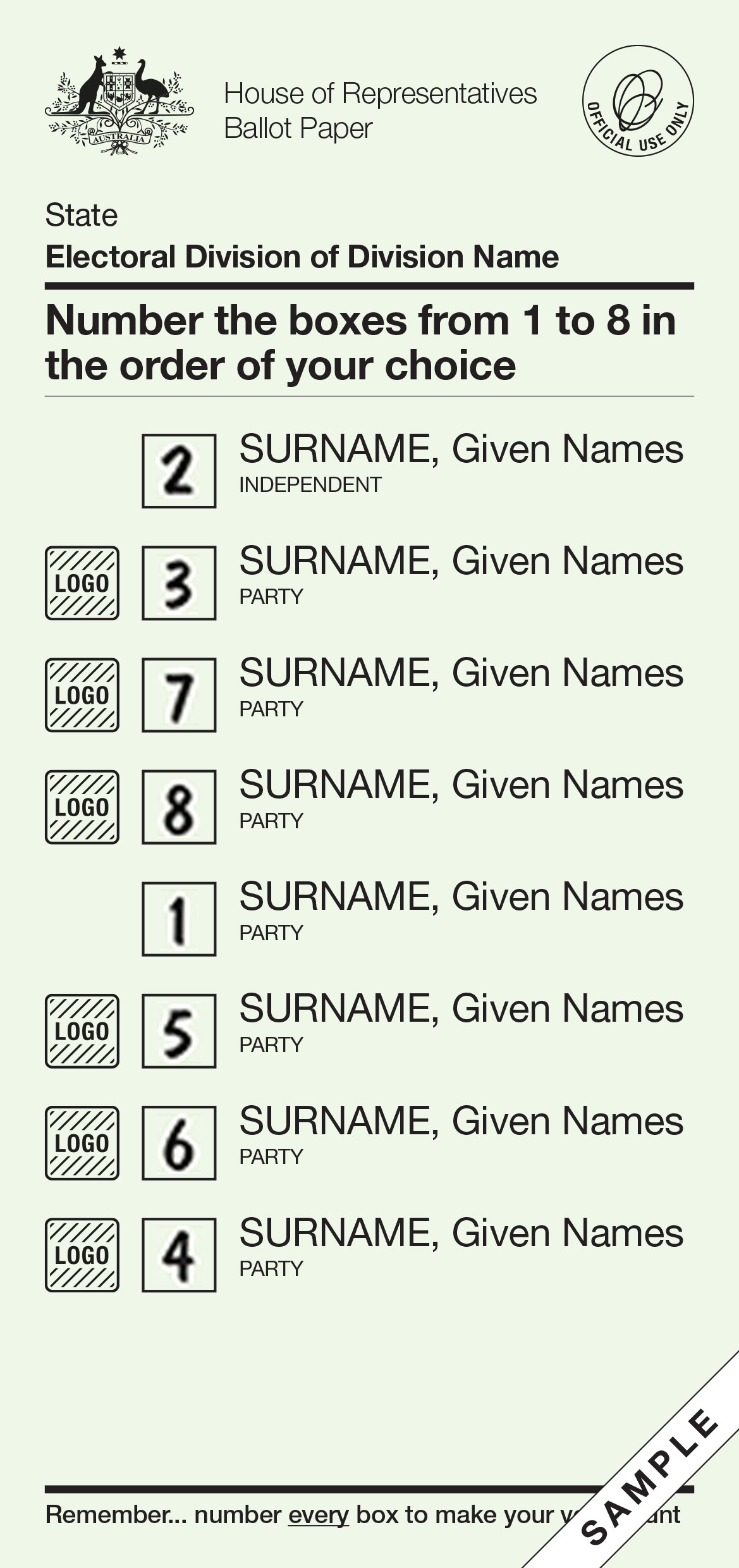
House of Representatives ballot paper

From the beginning of Federation until 1918, first-past-the-post voting was used in order to elect members of the House of Representatives but since the 1918 Swan by-election which Labor unexpectedly won with the largest primary vote due to vote splitting amongst the conservative parties, the Nationalist Party government, a predecessor of the modern-day Liberal Party of Australia, changed the lower house voting system to full preferential voting, as of the subsequent 1919 election. This system has remained in place ever since, allowing the Coalition parties to safely contest the same seats. Full-preference preferential voting re-elected the Hawke government at the 1990 election, the first time in federal history that Labor had obtained a net benefit from preferential voting.

From 1949 onwards, the vast majority of electorates, nearly 90%, are won by the candidate leading on first preferences, giving the same result as if the same votes had been counted using first-past-the-post voting. The highest proportion of seats (up to 2010) won by the candidate not leading on first preferences was the 1972 federal election, with 14 of 125 seats not won by the plurality candidate.

=== Allocation process for the House of Representatives ===
The main elements of the operation of preferential voting for single-member House of Representatives divisions are as follows:

- Voters are required to place the number "1" against their first choice of candidate, known as the "first preference" or "primary vote".
- Voters are then required to place the numbers "2", "3", etc., against all of the other candidates listed on the ballot paper, in order of preference. Every candidate must be numbered, otherwise the vote becomes "informal" (spoiled) and does not count.)
- Prior to counting, each ballot paper is examined to ensure that it is validly filled in (and not invalidated on other grounds).
- The number "1" or first preference votes are counted first. If no candidate secures an absolute majority (more than half) of first preference votes, then the candidate with the fewest votes is excluded from the count.
- The votes for the eliminated candidate (i.e. from the ballots that placed the eliminated candidate first) are re-allocated to the remaining candidates according to the number "2" or "second preference" votes.
- If no candidate has yet secured an absolute majority of the vote, then the next candidate with the fewest primary votes is eliminated. This preference allocation is repeated until there is a candidate with an absolute majority. Where a second (or subsequent) preference is expressed for a candidate who has already been eliminated, the voter's third or subsequent preferences are used.

Following the full allocation of preferences, it is possible to derive a two-party-preferred figure, where the votes have been allocated between the two main candidates in the election. In Australia, this is usually between the candidates from the Coalition parties and the Australian Labor Party.

== Relationship with the government ==
Under the Constitution, the governor-general has the power to appoint and dismiss the "Queen's [or King's] Ministers of State" who administer government departments. In practice, the governor-general chooses ministers in accordance with the traditions of the Westminster system that the government be drawn from the party or coalition of parties that has a majority in the House of Representatives, with the leader of the largest party becoming prime minister.

A sub-set of the most important ministers then meet in a council known as Cabinet. Cabinet meetings are strictly private and are frequently held to discuss vital issues and make policy decisions. The Constitution does not recognise the Cabinet as a legal entity; it exists solely by convention. Its decisions do not in and of themselves have legal force. However, it serves as the practical expression of the Federal Executive Council, which is Australia's highest formal executive body. In practice, the Federal Executive Council meets solely to endorse and give legal force to decisions already made by the Cabinet. All members of the Cabinet are members of the Executive Council. A senior Cabinet member holds the office of vice-president of the Executive Council and acts as presiding officer of the Executive Council in the absence of the governor-general. The Federal Executive Council is the Australian equivalent of the executive councils and privy councils in other Commonwealth realms such as the King's Privy Council for Canada and the Privy Council of the United Kingdom.

A minister must be a senator or member of the House of Representatives at the time of their appointment, or become one within three months of their appointment. This provision was included in the Constitution (section 64) to enable the inaugural ministry, led by Edmund Barton, to be appointed on 1 January 1901, even though the first federal elections were not scheduled to be held until 29 and 30 March.

The provision was also used after the disappearance and presumed death of the Liberal prime minister Harold Holt in December 1967. The Liberal Party elected John Gorton, then a senator, as its new leader, and he was sworn in as prime minister on 10 January 1968 (following an interim ministry led by John McEwen). On 1 February, Gorton resigned from the Senate to stand for the 24 February by-election in Holt's former House of Representatives electorate of Higgins due to the convention that the prime minister be a member of the lower house. For 22 days (2 to 23 February inclusive) he was prime minister while a member of neither house of parliament.

On a number of occasions when ministers have retired from their seats prior to an election, or stood but lost their own seats in the election, they have retained their ministerial offices until the next government is sworn in.

== Committees ==
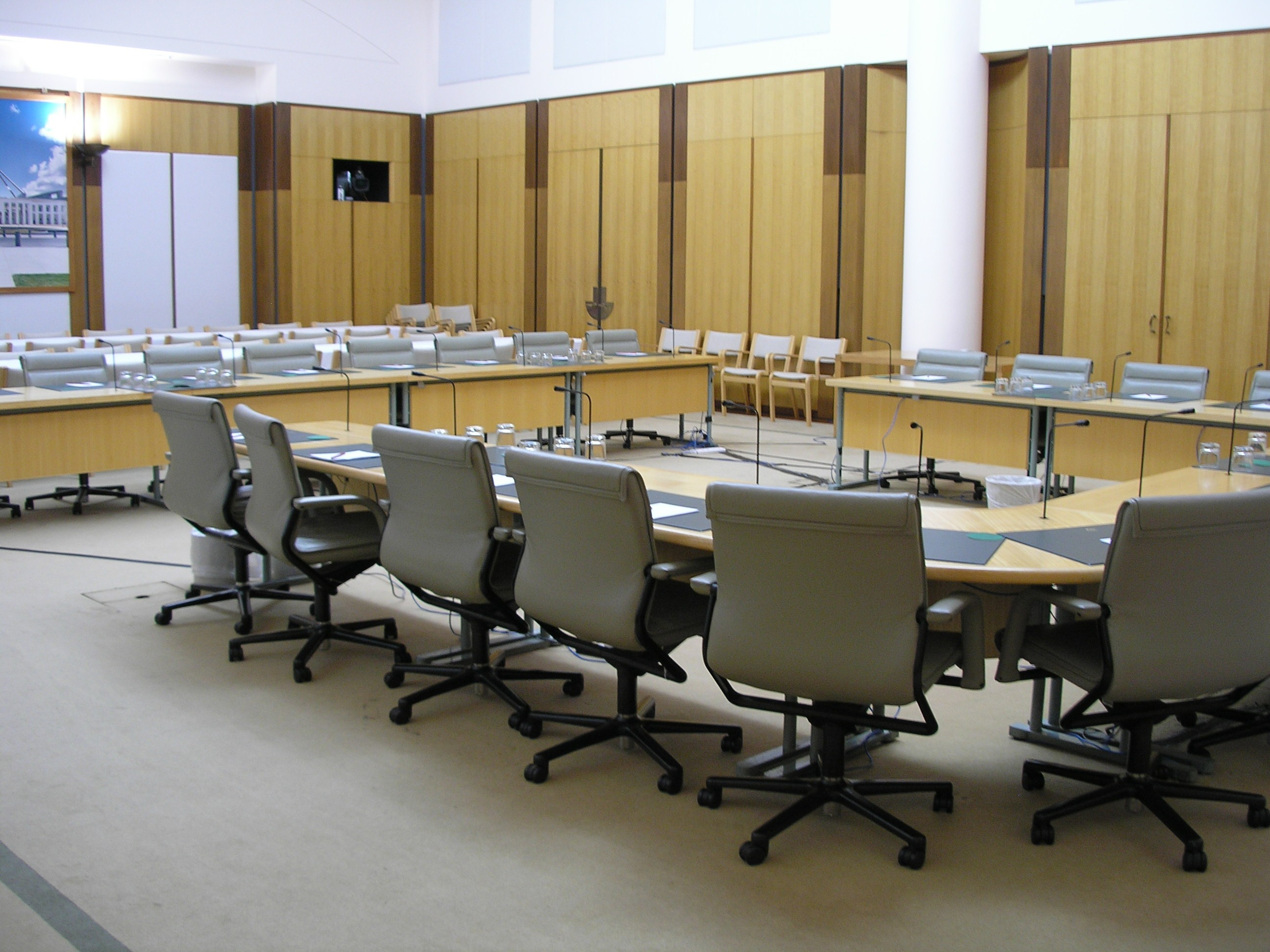
House of Representatives committee room, Parliament House, Canberra

In addition to the work of the main chamber, the House of Representatives also has a large number of committees which deal with matters referred to them by the main House. They provide the opportunity for all MPs to ask questions of ministers and public officials as well as conduct inquiries, examine policy and legislation. Once a particular inquiry is completed the members of the committee can then produce a report, to be tabled in Parliament, outlining what they have discovered as well as any recommendations that they have produced for the government to consider.

The ability of the chambers of Parliament to establish committees is given in section 49 of the Constitution, which states that, "The powers, privileges, and immunities of the Senate and of the House of Representatives, and of the members and the committees of each House, shall be such as are declared by the Parliament, and until declared shall be those of the Commons House of Parliament of the United Kingdom, and of its members and committees, at the establishment of the Commonwealth."

A short video on Australian Parliamentary Committees

Parliamentary committees can be given a wide range of powers. One of the most significant powers is the ability to summon people to attend hearings in order to give evidence and submit documents. Anyone who attempts to hinder the work of a Parliamentary committee may be found to be in contempt of parliament. There are a number of ways that witnesses can be found in contempt. These include refusing to appear before a committee when summoned, refusing to answer a question during a hearing or to produce a document, or later being found to have lied to or misled a committee. Anyone who attempts to influence a witness may also be found in contempt. Other powers include, the ability to meet throughout Australia, to establish subcommittees and to take evidence in both public and private hearings.

Proceedings of committees are considered to have the same legal standing as proceedings of Parliament, they are recorded by Hansard, except for private hearings, and also operate under parliamentary privilege. Every participant, including committee members and witnesses giving evidence, are protected from being prosecuted under any civil or criminal action for anything they may say during a hearing. Written evidence and documents received by a committee are also protected.

Types of committees include:

Standing committees, which are established on a permanent basis and are responsible for scrutinising bills and topics referred to them by the chamber; examining the government's budget and activities and for examining departmental annual reports and activities.

Select committees, which are temporary committees, established in order to deal with particular issues.

Domestic committees, which are responsible for administering aspects of the House's own affairs. These include the Selection Committee that determines how the House will deal with particular pieces of legislation and private members business and the Privileges Committee that deals with matters of parliamentary privilege.

Legislative scrutiny committees, which examine legislation and regulations to determine their impact on individual rights and accountability.

Joint committees are also established to include both members of the House of Representatives and the Senate.

== Federation Chamber ==
The Federation Chamber is a second debating chamber that considers relatively uncontroversial matters referred by the House. The Federation Chamber cannot, however, initiate or make a final decision on any parliamentary business, although it can perform all tasks in between.

The Federation Chamber was created in 1994 as the Main Committee, to relieve some of the burden of the House: different matters can be processed in the House at large and in the Federation Chamber, as they sit simultaneously. It is designed to be less formal, with a quorum of only three members: the deputy speaker of the House, one government member, and one non-government member. Decisions must be unanimous: any divided decision sends the question back to the House at large.

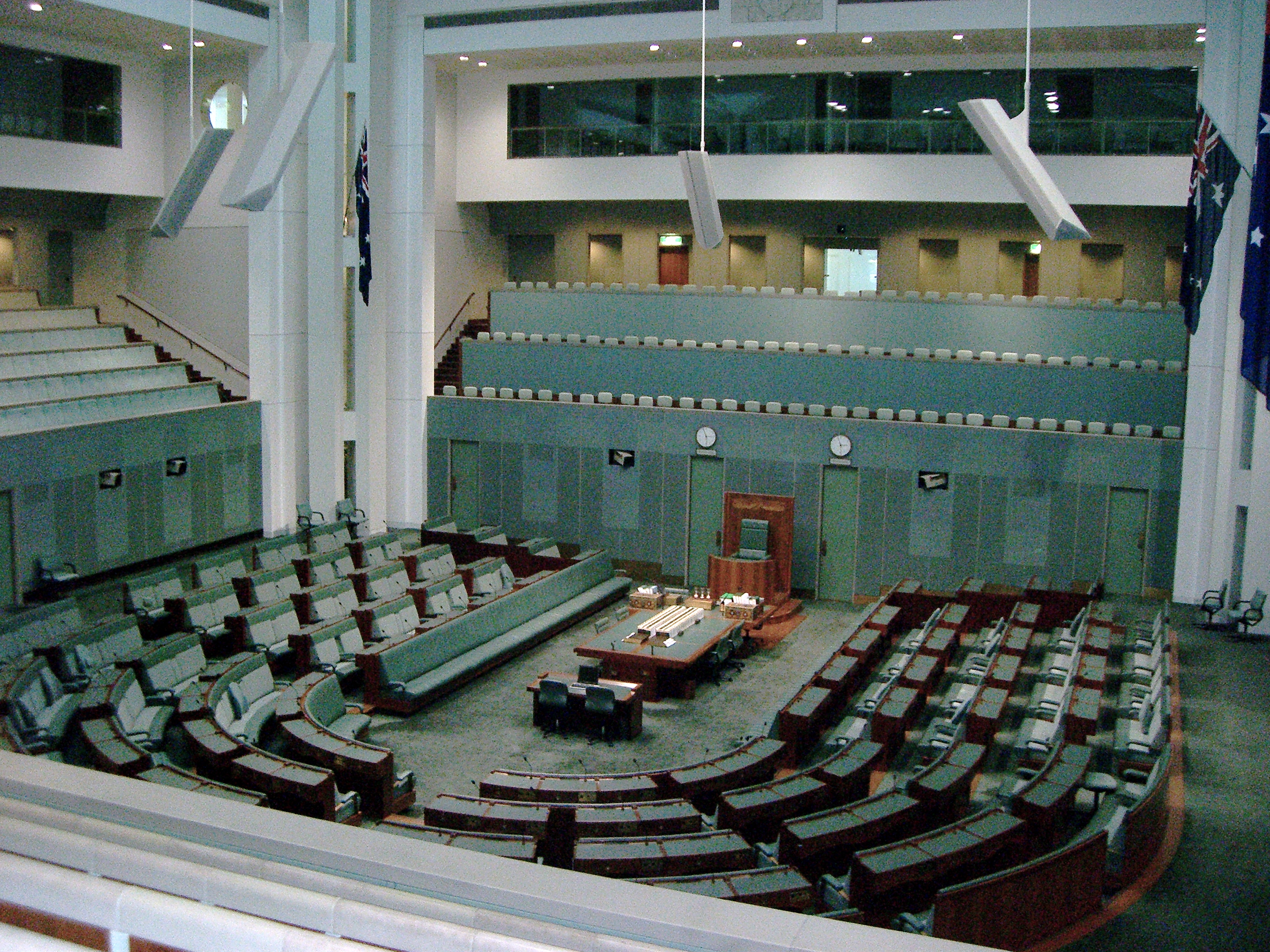
Inside the House of Representatives

The Federation Chamber was created through the House's standing orders: it is thus a subordinate body of the House, and can only be in session while the House itself is in session. When a division vote in the House occurs, members in the Federation Chamber must return to the House to vote.

The Federation Chamber is housed in one of the House's committee rooms; the room is customised for this purpose and is laid out to resemble the House chamber.

Due to the unique role of what was then called the Main Committee, proposals were made to rename the body to avoid confusion with other parliamentary committees, including "Second Chamber" and "Federation Chamber". The House of Representatives later adopted the latter proposal.

The concept of a parallel body to expedite Parliamentary business, based on the Australian Federation Chamber, was mentioned in a 1998 British House of Commons report, which led to the creation of that body's parallel chamber Westminster Hall.

== Primary, two-party and seat results ==
A two-party system has existed in the Australian House of Representatives since the two non-Labor parties merged in 1909 and continued with the creation of the Coalition in 1922. The 1910 election was the first to elect a majority government, with the Australian Labor Party concurrently winning the first Senate majority. Prior to 1909 a three-party system existed in the chamber. In 1919, the voting system changed from first-past-the-post to preferential voting. The two-party-preferred vote (2PP) has been commonly used since the 1970s to analyse how voting patterns relate to the seats won. ALP = Australian Labor Party, L+NP = grouping of Liberal/National/LNP/CLP Coalition parties (and predecessors), Oth = other parties and independents.

House of Representatives results
Election Year		Labor	Free Trade	Protectionist	Independent	Other parties		Total seats
1st	1901	14	28	31	2			75
Election Year		Labor	Free Trade	Protectionist	Independent	Other parties		Total seats
2nd	1903	23	25	26		1	Revenue Tariff	75
Election Year		Labor	Anti-Socialist	Protectionist	Independent	Other parties		Total seats
3rd	1906	26	26	21	1	1	Western Australian	75

	Primary vote			2PP vote		Seats			
Election	ALP	L+NP	Oth.	ALP	L+NP	ALP	L+NP	Oth.	Total
1901	19.4%	–	80.6% (Note: Protectionist (44.4%), Free Trade (34.2%), Independent Labor (0.6%), Others (2%))	–	–	14	–	61 (Note: Protectionist (31), Free Trade (28), Independent Labor (1), Other (1))	75
1903	31.0%	–	69% (Note: Protectionist (29.7%), Free Trade (34.4%), Others (5%))	–	–	23	–	52 (Note: Protectionist (26), Free Trade (25), Revenue Tariff (1))	75
1906	36.6%	–	63.4% (Note: Protectionist (16.4%), Anti-Socialists (38.2%), Others (8.7%))	–	–	26	–	49 (Note: Protectionist (16), Anti-Socialists (27), Others (6))	75
1910	50.0%	45.1%	4.9%	–	–	42	31	2	75
1913	48.5%	48.9%	2.6%	–	–	37	38	0	75
1914	50.9%	47.2%	1.9%	–	–	42	32	1	75
1917	43.9%	54.2%	1.9%	–	–	22	53	0	75
1919	42.5%	54.3%	3.2%	45.9%	54.1%	26	38	1	75
1922	42.3%	47.8%	9.9%	48.8%	51.2%	29	40	6	75
1925	45.0%	53.2%	1.8%	46.2%	53.8%	23	50	2	75
1928	44.7%	49.6%	5.8%	48.4%	51.6%	31	42	2	75
1929	48.8%	44.2%	7.0%	56.7%	43.3%	46	24	5	75
1931	37.8% (Note: 27.1% (ALP) + 10.6% (Lang Labor))	48.4%	24.5%	41.5%	58.5%	14	50	11	75
1934	41.2% (Note: 26.8% (ALP) + 14.4% (Lang Labor))	45.6%	27.6%	46.5%	53.5%	18	42	14	74
1937	43.1%	49.3%	7.5%	49.4%	50.6%	29	43	2	74
1940	40.1%	43.9%	15.9%	50.3%	49.7%	32	36	6	74
1943	49.9%	31.3%	18.6%	58.2%	41.8%	49	23	2	74
1946	49.7%	39.3%	11.0%	54.1%	45.9%	43	26	5	74
1949	46.0%	50.3%	3.7%	49.0%	51.0%	47	74	0	121
1951	47.7%	50.3%	2.1%	49.3%	50.7%	52	69	0	121
1954	50.1%	46.8%	3.2%	50.7%	49.3%	57	64	0	121
1955	44.7%	47.6%	7.8%	45.8%	54.2%	47	75	0	122
1958	42.9%	46.6%	10.6%	45.9%	54.1%	45	77	0	122
1961	48.0%	42.1%	10.0%	50.5%	49.5%	60	62	0	122
1963	45.5%	46.0%	8.5%	47.4%	52.6%	50	72	0	122
1966	40.0%	50.0%	10.0%	43.1%	56.9%	41	82	1	124
1969	47.0%	43.3%	9.7%	50.2%	49.8%	59	66	0	125
1972	49.6%	41.5%	8.9%	52.7%	47.3%	67	58	0	125
1974	49.3%	44.9%	5.8%	51.7%	48.3%	66	61	0	127
1975	42.8%	53.1%	4.1%	44.3%	55.7%	36	91	0	127
1977	39.6%	48.1%	12.2%	45.4%	54.6%	38	86	0	124
1980	45.1%	46.3%	8.5%	49.6%	50.4%	51	74	0	125
1983	59.5%	43.6%	6.9%	53.2%	46.8%	75	50	0	125
1984	47.5%	45.0%	7.4%	51.8%	48.2%	82	66	0	148
1987	45.8%	46.1%	8.1%	50.8%	49.2%	86	62	0	148
1990	39.4%	43.5%	17.1%	49.9%	50.1%	78	69	1	148
1993	44.9%	44.3%	10.7%	51.4%	48.6%	80	65	2	147
1996	38.8%	47.3%	14.0%	46.4%	53.6%	49	94	5	148
1998	40.1%	39.5%	20.4%	51.0%	49.0%	67	80	1	148
2001	37.8%	43.0%	19.2%	49.0%	51.0%	65	82	3	150
2004	37.6%	46.7%	15.7%	47.3%	52.7%	60	87	3	150
2007	43.4%	42.1%	14.5%	52.7%	47.3%	83	65	2	150
2010	38.0%	43.3%	18.7%	50.1%	49.9%	72	72	6	150
2013	33.4%	45.6%	21.0%	46.5%	53.5%	55	90	5	150
2016	34.7%	42.0%	23.3%	49.6%	50.4%	69	76	5	150
2019	33.3%	41.4%	25.2%	48.5%	51.5%	68	77	6	151
2022	32.6%	35.7%	31.7%	52.1%	47.9%	77	58	16	151
2025	34.6%	31.8%	33.6%	55.2%	44.8%	94	43	13	150

== See also ==
- Australian House of Representatives committees
- Canberra Press Gallery
- Chronology of Australian federal parliaments
- Clerk of the Australian House of Representatives
- Expansion of the Australian Parliament
- List of Australian federal by-elections
- List of longest-serving members of the Parliament of Australia
- Members of the Australian House of Representatives
- Members of the Australian Parliament who represented more than one state or territory
- Speaker of the Australian House of Representatives
- Women in the Australian House of Representatives
- Browne–Fitzpatrick privilege case, 1955
