= Council for Aboriginal Rights =

Former Australian human rights organisation

The Council for Aboriginal Rights (CAR) was founded in Melbourne in 1951 in order to improve rights for Indigenous Australians. Although based in the state of Victoria, it was a national organisation and its influence was felt throughout Australia; it was regarded as one of the most important Indigenous rights organisations of the 1950s. It supported causes in several other states, notably Western Australia and Queensland, and the Northern Territory. Some of its members went on to be important figures in other Indigenous rights organisations.

The Council wound up in the 1980s, after some of its work had borne fruit by bringing awareness of many injustices enshrined in legislation to the wider Australian and international community, and public opinion brought changes to the political landscape in Australia and both legislation and government support for services to Indigenous people had improved.

== Foundation ==
A strike in Darwin in 1950 led indirectly to the creation of CAR. The North Australian Workers' Union (NAWU) had supported the residents of the Aboriginal reserves of Bagot and Berrimah reserves in their actions opposing curfews imposed on them by the government, and demands for better housing, wages and working conditions. NAWU also publicised the exile of the leader of the strike action, Fred Waters, to Haast's Bluff, west of Alice Springs, over 1,500 km (930 mi) from his home and family, by the Department of Native Affairs, despite having not been convicted of any crime. NAWU president Murray Norris garnered support on a speaking tour of the eastern states, helping non-Indigenous people to understand the conditions suffered by Aboriginal Territorians.

After hearing Norris speak, a group of people founded the Council for Aboriginal Rights at a meeting on 16 March 1951, attended by about 70 people, including members of trades unions, women's organisations, and churches. The new organisation's aims were to fight for the rights of and justice for Aboriginal Australians, although pastor (and former footballer) Doug Nicholls and Bill Onus were the only Aboriginal people present. Its aim was to "plan, conduct and organize the widest possible support for a campaign to obtain justice for all Australian Aborigines". The group based the principles, constitution and subsequent campaigns of the council on the United Nations Declaration of Human Rights (passed in 1948), with the intention of testing existing Australian laws against this standard. The first office-bearers elected were:

- President: Farnham Maynard, an Anglican clergyman
- Vice-president: Colin Williams, a Methodist minister
- Honorary Secretary: Henry Wardlaw

Executive members (all peace activists) included Shirley Andrews, biochemist, researcher and activist, and Molly Rayne, an academic at the University of Melbourne.

A few months later, the first public meeting of the council was held in Melbourne Town Hall on 19 June 1951 and attracting 900 people, including individuals from other states and various organisations such as unions, women's organisations, and religious bodies who joined the new body. The three speakers at the inaugural meeting, medical practitioner and church moderator Charles Duguid of South Australia, writer Alan Marshall, and Doug Nicholls. The meeting publicised the new organisation.

== 1950s–1960s ==
In early 1952, Andrews was elected honorary secretary after Wardlaw resigned. She held this office until 1961, and through mobilising a network of contacts she developed, starting campaigns aiming to change discriminatory laws and practices, she and the council began to affect some of the entrenched negative attitudes towards Aboriginal people held by white Australians. Between 1953 and 1961 Andrews wrote and edited the biannual Bulletin, consisting of four or five foolscap pages stapled together which described the latest CAR activities. The Bulletin even reached members abroad in England, Italy, and India.

Among her contacts, there were a few particular people with whom she worked extensively. One of these was Don Mcleod, the Western Australian Aboriginal rights activist in the Pilbara in the mid-20th century. She enabled McLeod's lecture tour of the eastern states in 1955, which was sponsored by the council. About 3,000 Victorians were inspired by hearing him speak about Aboriginal self-determination in WA in the form of an Aboriginal-run mining company. Another of Andrews' regular correspondents was Mary Montgomerie Bennett, who worked with the Wongutha people of the Eastern Goldfields region of WA. Inspired by her work, Andrews lobbied the federal government for amendments to the Social Services Consolidation Act 1947 to enable Aboriginal people's eligibility for the old age pension, unemployment benefits, and other social services.

The council's focus was on educating non-Indigenous people about how Aboriginal people's rights were not heeded in many cases across the country. It organised defence for artist Albert Namatjira, after he was charged with an offence under the Welfare Ordinance 1953. Namatjira and well-known Aboriginal actor Robert Tudawali were mentioned in press releases and letters to newspapers which showed that government policy had a big influence on the disadvantage experienced by Aboriginal people, and proposed social and political solutions rather than welfare to end disadvantage.

During the 1950s the council was the strongest voice for justice for Aboriginal people in Australia, and (although it was itself a national organisation, working across the country) it worked towards the creation of a national advocacy body, to which state-based organisations would contribute. Andrews wrote to the Aborigines' Advancement League of South Australia and the Western Australian Native Welfare Council (created in 1952 at the request of the WA Minister for Native Affairs and co-founded by George Abdullah) in 1953 but her ideas were not greeted with action. However, in 1956 Australian suffragette and committee member of the Anti-Slavery and Aborigines' Protection Society in London, Jessie Street, wrote to Andrews about the council's plans to bring Australia's treatment of its Aboriginal population to the attention of the United Nations.

Duguid had a very high opinion of the work done by the Council for Aboriginal Rights, considering them the most important activist body in the 1950s.

Following the Warburton Ranges controversy in 1957, CAR was a founding member of the Federal Council for Aboriginal Advancement (FCAA, later FCAATSI), with representatives at the Adelaide meeting on 16 February 1958 which marked the founding of the first body which represented Aboriginal interests nationally. With the FCAA headquarters in Melbourne, CAR would often take on projects upon request by Davey, who was FCAA secretary.

In 1957 Barry Christophers became president after Baynes' resignation. Doug Nicholls and Stan Davey wished to focus more on the welfare needs of Aboriginal Victorians, so Andrews encouraged them to establish a new organisation; this would become the Victorian Aborigines Advancement League (VAAL), established in 1957 (now Aboriginal Advancement League). Both organisations remained affiliated with the FCAA. ASIO became interested in the organisation as several of the office bearers were members of the Communist Party of Australia, and it was during the Cold War years. By the 1960s, most of the affiliated religious organisations had withdrawn, and the Council consisted mainly of left-wing activists and researchers.

In 1961 Pauline Pickford took over the position of honorary secretary from Andrews. Pickford's presence brought in more Aboriginal Victorians, including Laurie Moffatt from Lake Tyers, Joe McGinness' sister Margaret Edwards, and Nicholls and Bill Onus were all active during the 1960s. After involvement with a case concerning the Cape Bedford Mission at Hope Vale in Queensland in 1961, Pickford retained close ties with Gladys O'Shane, president of the Cairns Aborigines and Torres Strait Islanders Advancement League (CATSIAL) and other activists from far north Queensland, such as McGinness and Evelyn Scott. Margaret Tucker was another notable member.

In 1962 it undertook to assist the FCAA with research for and the organisation of a campaign including a carefully-worded petition, to put pressure on the federal government to hold a referendum to allow constitutional change giving the Commonwealth the power to make laws pertaining to Indigenous Australians. Shirley Andrews, Barry Christopher and Stan Davey (of CAR) and Labor politician Gordon Bryant drafted the petition in Melbourne, which they then sent to other states for further refinement. The petition was headed "Towards equal citizenship for Aborigines", and it was deliberately different from that of earlier petitions (such as the 1957 petition launched by the Aboriginal-Australian Fellowship in Sydney). It highlighted the legislative and policy discrimination in the various states and territories "which deprive Aborigines of equal wages and employment opportunities and deny them the right to own and develop their remaining tribal lands". The laws and policies applied to Indigenous peoples governed matters including voting rights, marriage, property ownership, and wage rates, and there was wide disparity in the legislation within and among the states and territories. The FCAA petition campaign resulted in 103,000 signatures in 94 separate petitions.

== 1970s–1980s ==
In 1973 FCAATSI became an Indigenous-controlled body, and the Whitlam Labor government set up the National Aboriginal Consultative Committee in the same year, and helped to fund new organisations such as Aboriginal legal services and Aboriginal health services. CAR continued to support Indigenous enterprises, but its earlier sense of purpose had diminished. There is no evidence in the organisation's files, held in the State Library of Victoria, of an exact date when it ceased to function, but its activities appear to have come to an end in the mid-1980s.

== Legacy ==
The influence of the Council for Aboriginal Rights was immense, and it was a key player in the struggle for Indigenous rights in Australia. It helped to shape public opinion, and influenced the growing calls for constitutional reform. The work done on the FCAA's 1962 petition campaign was significant. The campaign led ultimately to the creation and passing of the 1967 referendum, which gave the Federal Government the power to make laws for Indigenous Australians in states, as well as including them in population counts (the Australian census).
