= Elizabeth Maud Hoffman =

Australian Aboriginal rights activist

- Born: Elizabeth Maud Morgan; 10 March 1927; Cummeragunja, NSW, Australia
- Died: 6 April 2009 (aged 82); Cummeragunja
- Other names: Aunty Liz, Yarmauk
- Occupation: Aboriginal rights activist
- Awards: NAIDOC Lifetime Achievement Award (2006), Victorian Honour Roll of Women

Elizabeth Maud Hoffman, née Morgan, also known as Aunty Liz or Yarmauk, (10 March 1927 – 6 April 2009) was an Australian Indigenous rights activist and public servant. She co-founded the first Indigenous Woman's Refuge in Australia, named "The Elizabeth Hoffman House" in her honour. She was one of 250 women included in the Victorian Honour Roll of Women in 2001 and received the inaugural NAIDOC Lifetime Achievement Award in 2006.

== Life ==
Elizabeth Maud Morgan was born on 10 March 1927 in Cummeragunja, an Aboriginal reserve in New South Wales. She was the second child of Michael Stafford Morgan and Maud Miriam Morgan (née Ross). Morgan's mother died when she was eleven, shortly after she had been removed from the family sent to live at the station hospital, where she worked as a domestic servant. In 1939, Morgan experienced the Cummeragunja walk-off, a protest by Aboriginal people against restrictive practices at the reserve, which shaped her further determination to fight for Aboriginal people's rights.

In 1954, Morgan gave birth to her first child, Ross. She was a single mother until 1956, when she met her partner with whom she had three children, Monica, Bernard and Denis. The family moved to Moama in New South Wales, but after separation, she took the children to Melbourne in 1971. Here she started to work with the Aborigines Advancement League (AAL) as Matron of Gladys Michell Youth Hostel.

== Activism and achievements ==
In early 1970s Hoffman co-founded an Aboriginal women's refuge in Melbourne, "The Elizabeth Hoffman House". In 1972, she also co-founded the Yorta Yorta Tribal Council, placing a claim over traditional lands. The same year she along with her sister Merle established the Victorian Aboriginal Legal Service in Fitzroy, and co-founded the Victorian Aboriginal Health Service along with Alma Thorpe, Bruce McGuinness, and others.

In 1973, Hoffman became a chairperson of the Aborigines Advancement League and the same year she started as a Board Member and actor in the Nindathanan Theatre. In 1974, Hoffman and Eric (Joe) McGuinness co-founded the Aboriginal Housing Cooperative, (Note: Not to be confused with the Aboriginal Housing Company in Redfern, Sydney.) with Hoffman as chairperson.

From 1975 to 1983, Hoffman was a salaried director of the Aborigines Advancement League, becoming the longest serving director of the AAL. During this time, she oversaw the AAL building appeal that resulted in relocation of the premises from Westgarth to Thornbury. In 1977–1978 Hoffman became the inaugural chairperson of the Victorian Aboriginal Child Care Agency (VACCA).

From the late 1970s until 1985, Hoffman was a commissioner with the Aboriginal Development Commission.

In 1982, Elizabeth Hoffman House became incorporated. In 1983, Hoffman returned to Cummeragunja and became a founding member of the Cummeragunja Housing and Development Corporation. In 1985, she became a founding member of the Yorta Yorta Local Aboriginal Land Council and the Housing Co-operative and the same year she was elected as the second Yorta Yorta Representative on the NSW Aboriginal Land Council. Helping to establish the Yorta Yorta Murray Goulburn Rivers Clans Group, Hoffman became its inaugural chairperson in 1993–1998. In 1998, she became an Elder of the Yorta Yorta Nation Aboriginal Corporation.

A collection of Hoffman's poetry To Our Koori Sons was published in 2009.

Elizabeth Maud Hoffman died on 6 April 2009 in Cummeragunja.

== Awards and honours ==
In 2001 Hoffman was one of the 250 women included in the Victorian Women's Honour Roll.

She was awarded a National NAIDOC Award for Lifetime Achievement in 2006. This award was granted for dedicating life to Aboriginal people, challenging governments and communicating about family violence, child protection practices, land rights, and protecting cultural and environmental heritage.

Hoffman is honoured in the mural Balit Naggt-bul in Melbourne featuring Life Members of Aboriginal Advancement League.
