= Aborigines and Torres Strait Islanders Advancement League =

Australian Indigenous rights organisation (1960–1970s)

The Aborigines and Torres Strait Islanders Advancement League, (CATSIAL), also referred to as the Cairns Aborigines and Torres Strait Islanders Advancement League or Cairns Aboriginal and Torres Strait Islander Advancement League, and Aborigines and Torres Strait Islanders Advancement League (Cairns), was an Indigenous rights organisation founded in Cairns, Queensland in January 1960. It existed until the late 1970s.

CATSIAL joined the national body, the Federal Council for Aboriginal Advancement (FCAA), soon after its establishment. It had an office in Townsville as well, and was associated with the Queensland Council for the Advancement of Aborigines and Torres Strait Islanders (QCAATSI) based in Brisbane, which was also part of the FCAA. The organisation was unusual in that both the membership and executive consisted mostly of Aboriginal and Torres Strait Islander people, whereas similar organisations in other states in the 1950s consisted mostly of Anglo-Australians, but the relationships between CATSIAL and the other groups grew strong nonetheless.

Gladys O'Shane was president of the League. Joe McGinness was secretary from 1958 to 1967, and also became president of the FCAA (later FCAATSI). Because of this connection, CATSIAL became active in the federal movement, initiating campaigns such as that against the Queensland legislation relating to Aboriginal and Torres Strait Islander people.

Most of the active members of the League were also members of the Communist Party of Australia (CPA), similar to the sister organisation in Victoria, the Council for Aboriginal Rights (CAR), as the CPA was the only political party in Australia that had developed a policy on Aboriginal Australians. The Cairns Trades and Labour Council, the Union of Australian Women and the Waterside Workers' Federation all supported the League both morally and financially. Trade unionists and CPA members assisted CATSIAL with their work.

The league fought to establish recognition of the fact that Aboriginal people were the original owners of the land, and also recognition as full citizens of Australia. The league's first success was getting a taxi driver who had been sacked on racial grounds reinstated, with the assistance of the local Trades and Labour Council.

The Queensland group kept close ties with the CAR activists such as Shirley Andrews, Stan Davey, Pauline Pickford, and Barry Christophers, in particular during and after their involvement with the case concerning the Cape Bedford Mission at Hope Vale in 1961.

Some of the targets of the League's campaigns apart from Hope Vale were: Queensland legislation which still discriminated against Indigenous people (the Aborigines' and Torres Strait Islanders' Affairs Act 1965 and its 1971 successors), police brutality (especially in Mareeba and Mossman), the 1967 referendum, educational opportunities, employment matters (including equal wages), and benefits for Torres Strait Islander ex-servicemen.
