= Lorna Lippmann =

Australian researcher and Aboriginal rights activist (1921–2004)

- Born: 21 December 1921; Melbourne, Victoria, Australia
- Died: 16 June 2004 (aged 82); Canterbury, New South Wales, Australia
- Education: University of Melbourne; Monash University
- Occupations: Academic researcher, writer and campaigner for the rights of Aboriginal Australians
- Employer(s): Department of War Organization of Industry; French Chamber of Commerce; Centre for Research into Aboriginal Affairs, Monash University; Office of the Commissioner for Community Relations; Australian Human Rights Commission
- Organization(s): Aboriginal Advancement League; Federal Council for the Advancement of Aborigines and Torres Strait Islanders (FCAATSI)
- Notable work: Words or Blows: Racial Attitudes in Australia (1973); Generations of Resistance: The Aboriginal Struggle for Justice (1981)
- Spouse: Walter Lippmann (m. 1945, d. 1993)

Lorna Sylvia Lippmann (21 December 1921 – 16 June 2004) was an Australian anthropology researcher, writer and campaigner for the rights of Aboriginal Australians. She was convenor of the Legislative Reform Committee of the Federal Council for the Advancement of Aborigines and Torres Strait Islanders (FCAATSI), campaigned for the 1967 Australian referendum (Aboriginals) on the legal status of Indigenous Australians, and worked as assistant director of Monash University's Centre for Research into Aboriginal Affairs (now known as the Centre for Australian Indigenous Studies). She was the author of works including Words or Blows: Racial Attitudes in Australia (1973) and Generations of Resistance: The Aboriginal Struggle for Justice (1981).

== Early life, family and education ==
Lippmann was born on 21 December 1921 in Melbourne, Victoria, Australia. Her father was born in Russia and had arrived in Australia in 1939, aged 3, after his Orthodox Jewish family fled from pogroms. Her mother was born in Australia and had Yorkshire and Jewish heritage.

Lippmann matriculated from the local Vaucluse convent school, where she had been taught by French Catholic nuns, when she was aged 14. After eight months working as a teaching aide at Yarra Primary School, she enrolled to study French at the University of Melbourne, graduating in 1942.

After achieving her bachelor's degree, Lippmann worked in the Department of War Organization of Industry for the remainder of World War II. She was then employed by the French Chamber of Commerce.

In 1945, Lorna married businessman and activist Walter Lippmann at the liberal synagogue Temple Beth Israel in Melbourne.

== Activism ==
After watching Douglas Nicholls and William Grayden’s film about the living conditions of Aboriginal people in Western Australia’s remote Warburton Ranges in 1957, Lippmann became a campaigner for the rights of Aboriginal Australians and advocate for Aboriginal people's right to self-determination. She joined the newly formed Aboriginal Advancement League (AAL) in the late 1950s and campaigned to prevent children from being taken away from their families.

Lippman became convenor of the Legislative Reform Committee of the Federal Council for the Advancement of Aborigines and Torres Strait Islanders (FCAATSI) in 1964. With the FCAATSI, she campaigned against discriminatory clauses in state and federal laws and worked towards the 1967 Australian referendum (Aboriginals) on the legal status of Indigenous Australians.

In 1963, Lippmann enrolled to study anthropology and sociology at Monash University and was invited to become a research assistant in the University's new Centre for Research into Aboriginal Affairs (now known as the Centre for Australian Indigenous Studies (CAIS)) during the course of her studies. She was later promoted to assistant director of the Centre.

Between 1969 and 1970, Lippmann interviewed Indigenous Australians from rural Victoria and New South Wales who had participated in cultural assimilation programs after the 1930s New Deal for Aborigines. Her research found that most became "ambivalent" about improvements to housing, but that there remained different opinions on the concept of steady employment being desirable or not, dividing the community.

Lippman published books based on her research projects, with her most important being Words or Blows: Racial Attitudes in Australia (1973) and Generations of Resistance: The Aboriginal Struggle for Justice (1981). Words Or Blows was described by the literary journal Meanjin Quarterly as an "important sociological work" and poet and author Kevin Gilbert wrote of the work that 'Mrs Lippmann is one of the very few whites in this country who have arrived at a clear understanding of what a truly meaningful Aboriginal policy must provide for the Aboriginal people'.

In 1975, Lippmann begun working as project officer and Victorian director for the Office of the Commissioner for Community Relations, where she was responsible for investigating complaints of racial discrimination. Lippmann then became community education officer for the Australian Human Rights Commission.

== Death and legacy ==
Lippmann died on 16 June 2004 in Canterbury, New South Wales, Australia. A year after her death, the Lorna Lippmann scholarship was set up at CAIS to assist indigenous students.

== Publications ==
- To Achieve Our Country: Australia and the Aborigines (1970), Cheshire, Melbourne.
- Words or Blows. Racial Attitudes in Australia (1973), Penguin, Ringwood.
- The Aim Is Understanding: Techniques to Promote Better Intergroup Relations (1977), Australia & New Zealand Book Company, Sydney.
- Generations of Resistance: The Aboriginal Struggle for Justice (1981).
- Generations of Resistance: Mabo and Justice (1994), Longman Cheshire, Melbourne.
