= Barrie Pittock =

Australian climate & environment scientist

Albert Barrie Pittock
- Born: 1938 (age 86–87); Camberwell Victoria Australia
- Died: 03 October 2024; Melbourne, Victoria
- Citizenship: Australia
- Education: Camberwell High School; Melbourne University
- Known for: Indigenous rights; Climate change; 2007 IPCC Nobel Peace Prize; Quakerism
- Spouse: Diana Pittock
- Children: Jamie Pittock; Mathew Pittock; Chris Pittock
- Scientific career
- Institutions: CSIRO (1965–1999)
- Thesis: (1963)

Albert Barrie Pittock (born 1938) is an Australian climatologist, environment scientist, author, and advocate for the rights of Indigenous Australians. He was among the many recipients of the 2007 Nobel Peace Prize.

== Early life and education ==
Barrie Pittock was born in Warrnambool, and grew up in Camberwell, Victoria, Australia. After attending Camberwell High School, he studied at Melbourne University, and attained his PhD in physics in 1963. While there became concerned about the educational (and other) inequalities facing Aboriginal communities in outback Australia.

== Human rights ==
From his teenage years onwards, but especially in the 1960s, Pittock was an active campaigner for Indigenous rights and educational opportunities for Aboriginal Australian and Torres Strait Islander people.

As a member of the Federal Council for the Advancement of Aborigines and Torres Strait Islanders, he became the convener of its Legislative Reform group in 1966, which led to his extensive involvement in the 1967 Aboriginal referendum and 1968 Aboriginal land rights campaigns.

He served on the committee of the Victorian Association for Immigration Reform from its formation in 1960, and on the Quaker Service Council of Australia from its inception in 1964.

== Climate change ==
In the 1970s he became aware of the potential for a global "nuclear winter" should warfare break out in the Northern Hemisphere, and of the slow progressive warming of the climate generally. He has written extensively on climate change, and been a campaigner for government policy to address it.

In the 1990s he was a member of the Climate Impact Group within the CSIRO, and was one of 16 Australian delegates to the Intergovernmental Panel on Climate Change.

== Awards ==
In 2019 he was awarded the Medal of the Order of Australia.

Pittock was a member of the Intergovernmental Panel on Climate Change that received the 2007 Nobel Peace Prize jointly with Al Gore.

In 1999 he was awarded an Australian Government Public Service Medal.

Upon graduating in 1963, he was awarded a Fulbright Scholarship to study at the National Center for Atmospheric Research in Boulder, Colorado, United States.

== Personal life ==
In 1956 Pittock was a conscientious objector to compulsory military training associated with the Korean War, and began attending Quaker meetings, where he was drawn to the testimonies of peace and equality. In 1959 he was formally accepted into membership of the Victoria Regional Meeting of Quakers in Australia.

In 1969 he presented the sixth James Backhouse Lecture "Toward a Multi-Racial Society".

After his retirement in 1999, Pittock continued writing and campaigning for climate change mitigation and for Indigenous rights, but his writing and other activities have dwindled since he was diagnosed with Alzheimer's disease in 2014.

He was a featured resident of Mayflower Village in 2019.
