= Bruce McGuinness =

Australian Aboriginal activist

- Born: 17 June 1939; Cootamundra, New South Wales, Australia
- Died: 5 September 2003 (aged 64); Melbourne, Victoria
- Years active: 1960–1990
- Known for: Indigenous rights activism
- Notable work: The Koorier
- Children: Kelli McGuinness (son), in the band Blackfire

Bruce Brian McGuinness (17 June 1939 – 5 September 2003) was an Australian Aboriginal activist. He was active in and led the Victorian Aborigines Advancement League, and is known for founding and running The Koorier, which was the first Aboriginal-initiated national broadsheet newspaper (later known as National Koorier and then Jumbunna) between 1968 and 1971.

== Early life and education ==
A Wiradjuri man, McGuinness was born on 17 June 1939 in Cootamundra.

He studied law at Monash University but did not accept his degree.

== Activism ==
In the late 1960s he travelled to the United States to attend a Pan-Pacific Conference, where he was inspired by the Black Panther Party to advocate for increased rights for Aboriginal Australians. He was an early member of the Aboriginal Advancement League (aka Victorian Aborigines Advancement League, or VAAL), later becoming president, following Doug Nicholls in the role. His appointment led to some dissent in the organisation, as moderate VAAL members, including Nicholls, were concerned that McGuinness' more radical approach would turn people away from VAAL. McGuinness forged connections with more radical Aboriginal activists from across Australia, such as Gary Foley (whom he mentored) and Denis Walker, and the world. Foley wrote in an epitaph that McGuinness "was in many ways an unreconstructed Marxist-Leninist to the end".

He joined the Federal Council for the Advancement of Aborigines and Torres Strait Islanders and became its Victorian state director, but in 1970 broke away to form the National Tribal Council with Foley, Walker and Naomi Mayers.

McGuinness advocated for Aboriginal people to take control of their own affairs. In 1969, he invited Caribbean Black Power activist Roosevelt Brown to speak visit VAAL, and started seeing the Aboriginal struggle against the backdrop of colonialism and white power. In the November 1972 issue of Identity magazine, in an article about Black Power, referring to the July 1972 Black Moratorium protest in Melbourne, he wrote: "The day of reckoning has arrived. I have just slayed the white myth of black subservience and docility... At your own hands, you, white man, have been appointed your own executioner". Despite his generally radical stance, he did not dismiss non-Aboriginal activists, and praised the work of white campaigners such as Stan Davey and Gordon Bryant in the late 1950s and 1960s.

McGuinness helped establish the Victorian Aboriginal Health Service, along with Alma Thorpe and others, in 1973, and was also co-founder of the National Aboriginal and Islander Health Organisation.

== The Koorier ==
McGuiness founded and was responsible for The Koorier, which was the first Aboriginal-initiated national broadsheet newspaper (later known as National Koorier and then Jumbunna). The Koorier and Jumbunna were published by the Victorian Aborigines Advancement League (VAAL), while the National Koorier was the mouthpiece of the National Tribal Council. It was published in Fitzroy between 1968 and 1971, and Lin Onus and Bob Maza were significant contributors to the paper.

Like Identity, published in Perth, the paper was used to stimulate political activity, and to disseminate messages in and beyond the Indigenous public sphere, to educate the non-Indigenous Australian public.

Young activist Robbie Thorpe, inspired by McGuinness' publication, later produced The Koorier 2 during the 1970s and 1980s, and later The Koorier 3, published by the Koori Information Centre.

== Films ==
McGuinness directed the film Black Fire, also titled Blackfire, thought to be the first film directed by an Indigenous Australian person. Doug Nicholls, Harry Williams, and his son Bertie Williams starred in the film, and Lin Onus was responsible for sound production. The release date is usually cited as 1972, and the runtime recorded as 20 minutes, but some sources date it as 1969, with a runtime of 60 minutes. McGuinness created the film as an anthropology assignment, in collaboration with his non-Aboriginal friend Martin Bartfeld, on a budget of A$500. (Note: However, a short film dating from 1946 made by Bill Onus was recently discovered, and features in his grandson Tiriki's film Ablaze (2021).)

His son Kelli McGuinness was a member of a 1990s band called Blackfire, with Kutcha Edwards as lead singer. Their first album was called A Time to Dream, and McGuinness gave the same name to his second film, released in 1974.

== Later life and death ==
He was awarded an honorary doctorate by Tranby College shortly before his death from emphysema in Melbourne on 5 September 2003.
