= Muriel Bamblett =

Yorta Yorta and Dja Dja Wurrung advocate for Aboriginal child welfare

Muriel Pauline Bamblett AO
- Occupations: Chief executive, professor
- Known for: Aboriginal child welfare
- Awards: Centenary of Federation Medal

Muriel Pauline Bamblett AO is a Yorta Yorta, Dja Dja Wurrung, Taungurung, Boon Wurrung Elder and advocate for Aboriginal child welfare in Victoria and Australia.

== Career ==
Bamblett has been the chief executive of Victorian Aboriginal Child and Community Agency (VACCA), since 1999. In 2009, Bamblett was made an adjunct professor in the School of Social Work and Social Policy at La Trobe University. She is also currently the chairperson of the Secretariat of National Aboriginal and Islander Child Care (SNAICC).

Bamblett is a member of the Victorian Treaty Elders' Voice Group; Aboriginal Family Violence Steering Committee; Victorian Children's Council; Aboriginal Justice Forum; and the Aboriginal Community Elders Service. From 2009 to 2011 she was a member of the board of the Northern Territory Inquiry into Child Protection. She was elected to the Victorian First Peoples' Assembly in November 2019.

=== Recognition ===
In 2019, Bamblett was awarded the Order of Australia for distinguished service to the Indigenous community of Victoria as an advocate for the self-determination and cultural rights of children.

Bamblett also received the Centenary of Federation Medal; the Robin Clark Memorial Award for Inspirational Leadership in the Field of Child and Family Welfare; and the Women's Electoral Lobby Inaugural Vida Goldstein Award. She was inducted onto the Victorian Honour Roll of Women in 2011. In 2017 she was awarded an honorary degree of Doctor of Letters in Social Work by the University of Sydney in recognition of her outstanding contribution to Aboriginal child and family welfare.

She was awarded the Person of the Year Award at the 2024 NAIDOC Awards.
