= Mollie Dyer =

Aboriginal Australian child welfare worker

- Born: 1927; Barmah, Victoria, Australia
- Died: 1998 (aged 70–71)
- Occupations: Aboriginal Australian child welfare worker and community worker
- Children: 6
- Parent(s): Margaret Tucker and Philip Tucker

Mollie Geraldine Dyer AM (1927–1998) was an Aboriginal Australian child welfare worker and community worker, best known for co-founding the Victorian Aboriginal Child and Community Agency in 1977. In later life, she was a respected elder and spokesperson, known as "Auntie Mollie".

== Early life and education ==
Mollie Geraldine Dyer, later known as "Auntie Mollie," was born in 1927 in Barmah, Victoria, Australia, of Yorta Yorta descent. She was the daughter of Margaret Tucker, an Aboriginal activist involved in establishing the Australian Aborigines League, and Philip Tucker, an Irishman.

Dyer grew up in Hawthorn and Hastings and was educated at a convent school in Abbotsford, where she was the only Aboriginal pupil. She would frequently travel to New South Wales to stay with her mother's family at Cummeragunja Mission. When Dyer's father was serving overseas during World War II, Dyer, aged 15, left school to enter the workforce, where she experienced significant racism.

== Career and advocacy ==
In the 1960s and 1970s, Dyer worked with a group of fellow Aboriginal women to establish and deliver services to the Aboriginal community despite a lack of funding. In 1966, Dyer accepted a full-time position with the Aborigines Advancement League, continuing and formalising her welfare work.

When the Victorian Aboriginal Legal Service was established in 1973, Dyer moved to a position there.

In 1976, Dyer delivered a speech at a national adoption conference, and this instigated discussion of an Aboriginal-run agency to support Aboriginal children and families. The Victorian Aboriginal Child Care Agency was established, and Dyer served as Program Director, and soon similar organisations were established in other parts of Australia. Dyer worked to establish the Secretariat of National Aboriginal and Islander Child Care (SNAICC) in 1981.

In the 1980s, Dyer was a respected elder and spokesperson. She was part of the group that established the Brambuk Living Cultural Centre in Halls Gap and held positions on numerous boards and committees. She also organised several awareness-raising conferences for public servants.

== Personal life ==
Dyer's first marriage, to Alan Burns in 1947, produced six children, all of whom were to become involved in Aboriginal community work and activism. She later married Charlie Dyer. In addition to her six biological children, Dyer fostered 20 more children.

== Recognition and honours ==
Dyer was made a Member of the Order of Australia in the Queen's Birthday Honours List in June 1979 in recognition of service to the Aboriginal community.

She received the International Year of the Child Award and the Advance Australia Medal. The Victorian Aboriginal Child Care Agency headquarters was named in her honour.

== Death and legacy ==
Dyer died in 1998. Dyer's memoir Room for One More: The Life of Mollie Dyer was published in 2003, although it had been written before Dyer's 1998 death.

According to her entry in the Victorian Aboriginal Honour Roll, "Through her efforts she challenged institutionalised prejudices at the highest levels, forging a legacy of respect and understanding that lives on today".

In 2012, she was inducted into the Victorian Aboriginal Honour Roll.

A street in the ACT suburb of Bonner is named after her.
