= Alma Thorpe =

Australian Aboriginal elder and activist

- Born: Alma Beryl Brown; 1935 (age 90–91)
- Occupations: Aboriginal elder and activist
- Known for: co-founded the Victorian Aboriginal Health Service
- Relatives: Lidia Thorpe (granddaughter)

Alma Beryl Thorpe (born 1935) is an Australian Aboriginal elder and activist. In 1973, she co-founded the Victorian Aboriginal Health Service (VAHS), together with her mother, Edna Brown, and Bruce McGuinness.

== Early life and education ==
Thorpe was born in Melbourne during the Great Depression in Australia in 1935, and her family lived in the suburb of Fitzroy. Her mother was Edna Brown, who, after being forced off the Framlingham Aboriginal Reserve in 1932, aged 15, became a community organiser in Fitzroy. She set up an Aboriginal funeral fund from her new home, after observing many homeless Aboriginal men being buried in pauper's graves. Her father, James Brown, was a second-generation Scottish-Australian who worked for Victorian Railways and was a communist involved in the labour movement.

Thorpe left school at the age of 12 and worked in a shoe factory, and at 18 married and moved to the town of Yallourn.

In the 1960s, Thorpe separated from her husband and returned to Melbourne, along with her children, and began work as a barmaid.

== Achievements ==
Inspired by her mother, Edna, Thorpe joined community leaders such as Geraldine Briggs and Margaret Tucker in protests for Aboriginal rights. In 1972, she was involved in setting up the Aboriginal Tent Embassy.

In 1973, together with her mother and co-founder Bruce McGuinness, she helped to establish the Victorian Aboriginal Health Service (VAHS) to help the Aboriginal community with their health and wellbeing. Through her communist connections, she had been able to enter China and observe the 'barefoot doctors' program; from this experience came her concept of the Aboriginal Health Worker. According to McGuinness, "Without Alma Thorpe there wouldn't have been a health service".

Thorpe also set up the Yappera Children's Service to provide childcare, and in 1977, a youth club and gym, later renamed Melbourne Aboriginal Youth Sport and Recreation (MAYSAR).

== Current positions ==
As of 2019, she is Elder in Residence at the Institute of Koorie Education at Deakin University and continues her work with MAYSAR.

== Recognition ==
As a reward for her efforts in the Aboriginal community, she was made a lifetime member of the Aborigines Advancement League.

== Personal life and family ==
Thorpe had seven children with her husband and later fostered two more on her own.

Her daughter Marjorie Thorpe was a commissioner on the Stolen Generations inquiry that produced the Bringing Them Home report, and later a member of the Council for Aboriginal Reconciliation, and a preselected Australian Greens federal candidate for the electorate of Gippsland. Before that, she was coordinator of SNAICC and director of the Victorian Aboriginal Child Care Agency.

Marjorie's daughter Lidia Thorpe became the first Indigenous woman elected to the Parliament of Victoria in 2018, and the first Victorian Aboriginal Senator in 2020.
