= Otto van der Sprenkel =

Dutch bibliographer, political scientist, and historian

Otto Pierre Nicolas Berkelbach van der Sprenkel (1906–1978) was a Dutch bibliographer, political scientist, and historian of China.

== Early life ==
Born in Bussum, van der Sprenkel was raised in the UK and earned First-Class Honours at the London School of Economics.

== Career ==
He held academic positions at the University of Toronto and SOAS. At Nankai University on a British Council appointment. He experienced the Chinese Communist Revolution, an experience that contributed to the book he co-authored (with Michael Lindsay, 2nd Baron Lindsay of Birker and Robert Guillain) New China, Three Views (1950).

He returned to SOAS before moving to Australia to teach at the Canberra University College in 1956 and continued at the Australian National University when the college was amalgamated. He was a Foundation Fellow of the Australian Academy of the Humanities in 1969. He retired in 1971. His attempt at compiling a comprehensive bibliography of Chinese history in Western languages was incomplete at his death, though held in manuscript form at the National Library of Australia, to which he also donated or bequeathed numerous rare books. His work on late imperial China was noted for his work on the bureaucratic system, which was also the topic of his 1957 Morrison Lecture.

== Personal life ==
A convert to the Society of Friends in 1956, he gave the 1973 James Backhouse Lecture "Friends and Other Faiths."

He died in Canberra.
