= Backhouse Lecture =

Annual presentation series

The Backhouse Lecture series has been given annually since 1964 as a presentation at Quakers Yearly Meeting in Australia. It is similar in themes and structure to the Swarthmore Lecture series in Britain. Also known as the James Backhouse Lecture, as it is named for James Backhouse.

== Past Lectures ==
Year	Venue	Presenter	Topic	Link
2025	Melbourne, Victoria (and on-line)	Tim Gee	The seed is in all: A journey through the Quaker world	video»
2024	Adelaide, South Australia (and on-line)	Jackie Leach-Scully	(60th anniversary) God’s ways, not our ways: A dissident Quaker response to disability	video» book»
2023	Hobart, Tasmania (and on-line)	Jon Watts	Quakers, the Internet, and What’s Next	video»
2022	on-line	Yarrow Goodley	Creating hope: Working for justice in catastrophic times	video»
2021	on-line	(Panel discussion)	The 2021 Australian Backhouse Panel Discussion: Searching for Truth: Friends in a 'post-truth' - world	video» transcript» resources»
2020	on-line	Fiona Gardner	Seeking Union with Spirit: Experiences of Spiritual Journeys	video»
2019	Hobart, Tasmania	Jason MacLeod	Animating Freedom: Accompanying Indigenous struggles for self-determination	video»
2018	Cooranbong, NSW	Cho-Nyon Kim	An Encounter between Quaker Mysticism and Taoism in Everyday Life	video» transcript»
2017	Adelaide, South Australia	David Carline	Reflections on the 50th anniversary of the 1967 Referendum in the context of two Aboriginal life stories	video»
2016		Margery Post Abbott	Everyday Prophets	video»
2015		Sally Herzfeld and Alternatives to Violence Project Members	This We Can Do: Quaker faith in action through the Alternatives to Violence Project	
2014		Tracy Bourne	Our life is love, and peace, and tenderness; Bringing children into the centre of Quaker life and worship	
2013		Jocelyn Bell Burnell	A Quaker astronomer reflects: Can a scientist also be religious	
2012		David Atwood	From the inside out: Observations on Quaker work at the United Nations	jstor»
2011		Rosemary (Rowe) Morrow	A demanding and uncertain adventure: Exploration of a concern for Earth restoration and how we must live to pass on to our children - and their children, and all living things - an Earth restored	jstor»
2010		(54 contributors)	Finding our voice Our truth, community and journey as Australian Young Friends	jstor»
2009		Helen Gould	The Quaking Meeting Transforming our selves, our meetings and the more-than-human world	audio» jstor»
2008		George Ellis	Faith, hope and doubt in times of uncertainty Combining the realms of scientific and spiritual inquiry	audio» jstor»
2007		Jenny Spinks	Support for our true selves - Nurturing the space where leadings flow	audio» jstor»
2006		Polly O. (Daksi) Walker	One Heart and a Wrong Spirit: The Religious Society of Friends and Colonial Racism	jstor»
2005		David Johnson	Peace is a Struggle	
2004	Armadale North, Victoria	Ute Caspers	Growing a Fruitful Friendship - A Garden Walk	audio» au-nla» jstor» ouevre» bio»(German)
2003		Helen Bayes	Respecting the Rights of Children and Young People: A New Perspective on Quaker Faith and Practice	audio» jstor» jstor»
2002		Mark Deasey	To Do Justly, And To Love Mercy: learning from Quaker service	audio» jstor»
2001		Hendrik W van der Merwe	Reconciling Opposites: Reflections on peacemaking in South Africa	audio» jstor»
2000	Armadale North, Victoria	Susannah Kay Brindle	To Learn A New Song: A Quaker Contribution Towards Real Reconciliation with the Earth and its Peoples	audio» jstor»
1999		Norman Talbot	Myth and Stories, Lies and Truth	
1998		Charles Stevenson	Embraced by Other Selves: Enriching personal nature through group interaction	audio» jstor»
1997		Richard G. Meredith	Learning of one another The Quaker encounter with other cultures and religions	audio» jstor»
1996		Elise Boulding	Our Children, our Partners A new vision for social action in the 21st century	jstor»
1995	(from Bangkok, Thailand)	Donna Kyle Anderton & Barbara Baker Bird	Emerging Currents in the Asia-Pacific	audio»
1994		Di Bretherton	As the Mirror Burns Making a Film about Vietnam	
1993		Ursula Jane O'Shea	Living the Way Quaker spirituality and community	jstor»
1992	No Backhouse Lecture given.			
1991		David James and Jillian Wychel	Loving the Distances Between: Racism, Culture and Spirituality	jstor»
1990		Jo Vallentine and Peter D. Jones	Quakers in Politics: Pragmatism or Principle?	jstor»
1989		Erica Fisher	A New-Born Sense of Dignity and Freedom	
1988		David Purnell	Creative Conflict	
1987		Carol and Dougald McLean	The Vision That Connects - Building The Future We Choose	
1986		Susumu Ishitani	Looking for Meanings of My A-Bomb Experience in Nagasaki	
1985		Gerald Priestland	For All The Saints	
1984		Peter D. Jones	Pilgrims for Justice and Peace	
1983		Sabine Willis	An Adventure into Feminism with Friends	
1982		John Ormerod Greenwood	Celebration: A Missing Element in Quaker Worship	
1981		Roger C. Wilson	What Jesus Means To Me: Jesus the Liberator	
1980		Hector Kinloch	Quakers and Sacramental History: Reflections on Quaker Saints by a Quaker Sinner	
1979		J. Duncan Wood	Quakers in the Modern World: The Relevance of Quaker Beliefs to the Problems of the Modern World	
1978		Margaret Wilkinson	Wisdom: The Inner Teacher	
1977	Naarmaroo, NSW	Mary Woodward	Papua New Guinea: Third World on our doorstep	transcript» jstor»
1976		Stewart and Charlotte Meacham	Imperialism Without Invading Armies: peace, justice and the multinationals in Southeast Asia	
1975		Winifred A. M McNaughton	A Time To Reap, A Time To Sow: Retirement	
1973 (Aug)		Yukio Irie	Pilgrimage Toward The Fountainhead: Quakerism and Zen Buddhism Today	oeuvre» (date falls in FY 1974)
1973		Otto B. Van Sprenkel	Friends and Other Faiths	
1972		L. Hugh Doncaster	The Quaker Message: a Personal Affirmation	oeuvre»
1971	No Backhouse Lecture was given this year; instead, David Hodgkin gave an address under the title "Quakerism-A Mature Religion for Today", which was printed but not as a James Backhouse Lecture.			subsequent revision»
1970	Melbourne, Vic	Keith A. W. Crook	Security for Australia?	transcript»
1969	Pymble, NSW	A. Barrie Pittock	Toward a Multi-Racial Society	transcript» jstor» bio»
1968		William N. Oats	In The Spirit of the Family	bio»
1967		Douglas V. Steere	On Being Present Where You Are	
1966		Rudolf Lemberg	Seeking In An Age Of Imbalance	jstor»
1965		Clive Sansom	The Shaping Spirit	
1964		Kenneth E. Boulding	The Evolutionary Potential Of Quakerism	

Further details on Quakers Australia's website.
