= Hector Kinloch =

American-born Australian academic and politician (1927–1993)

Hector Gilchrist Lusk Mactaggart Kinloch
- Born: 14 December 1927; Boston, Massachusetts, United States
- Died: 6 August 1993 (aged 65); Canberra, Australia
- Citizenship: Australian
- Known for: lecturing on US History; radio reporting on US politics (to an Australian audience); work on Gambling Addiction; campaigning against allowing Casinos in Canberra
- Spouses: Anne Russell (b. 8-Dec-1931; m. 1955; div. 1966); Lucy Maniam (b. 20-Jan-1939; m. Dec-1966; d. 19-Aug-2019)
- Children: 3

Academic background
- Education: Christ's College, Cambridge (grad. 1949); Yale University (1955-1960)
- Thesis: Anglican Clergy in Connecticut 1701-1785 (1960)

Hector Gilchrist Lusk Mactaggart Kinloch (14 December 1927 – 6 August 1993) was an American-born Australian academic and politician.

== Biography ==
He was born Boston, Massachusetts, in 1927.

He travelled to England, where he graduated from Christ's College, Cambridge with first class honors in history in 1949.

After graduating he served in the US Army for three years. In 1960, he moved to Australia and lectured in history at the University of Adelaide. From 1965-1968, he was Visiting Fulbright Professor of US History at the University of Malaya in Kuala Lumpur. He joined the Australian National University in Canberra in 1968 and remained there until 1988.

He helped establish the National Association for Gambling Studies and was a vociferous critic of the proposed Casino Canberra. Given his anti-gambling stance he was invited by Bernard Collaery of the Residents Rally to be a candidate in the inaugural ACT Legislative Assembly election. He was elected in 1989 and retired in 1992.

He died on 6 August 1993.

== Personal life and religious background ==
Hector Kinloch's childhood was difficult, with many family crises and periods living in Dr Barnado's Homes and foster care.

He was married twice, to Anne Russell from 1955 to 1964 (divorce finalized in 1966), and to Lucy Maniam from December 1966 until his death. In 1993 Lucy was still working at Dickson College.

He was a life-long Christian, and joined the Canberra Regional Meeting of the Society of Friends (Quakers) in May 1971, where he held many active roles. He had a particular interest in the life of the early Quaker John Woolman, and delivered the 1980 Backhouse Lecture on the topic “Quaker Saints and Sinners”.

He travelled widely, including the US, Northern Ireland, England, Australia, and Singapore.

== Legacy ==
Kinloch Circuit in the Canberra suburb of Bruce is named after him, as is the Kinloch UniLodge on the ANU campus, and the north tower of ANU Fenner Hall residence.

== External links and references ==
- Australian Dictionary of Biography
- Photo of Hector Kinloch, National Archives of Australia
- Death of Dr Kinloch, Condolence Debate, ACT Legislative Assembly 17 August 1993
- Testimony to the Grace of God in the life of Hector Kinloch for the Canberra Regional Meeting of the Religious Society of Friends (Quakers) in Australia.
- Scans of archive records show him:

- being registered for the US draught (order no K-14455-X) on his 18th birthday (despite having emigrated to the UK more than 10 years earlier)
- according to the 1950 US census, living at Fort Dix
- departing New York for Southampton on 27 December 1952
- arriving at New York from Southampton on 30 August 1953
- with Anne arriving at Liverpool from New York on 20 June 1958

Specific
