= One Man's Road =

- Directed by: Bob Kingsbury
- Starring: Clive Andrew Williams (1915–1980)
- Edited by: Ian Dunlop
- Production company: Commonwealth Film Unit
- Release date: 1967
- Running time: 26 minutes
- Country: Australia
- Language: English

One Man's Road (1967) is a short Australian documentary film about the experiences of Aboriginal Australians.

The most prominent role in the movie was given to Aboriginal Australian activist Clive Andrew Williams (1915–1980). Upon the film's release, Williams was dismayed to find that the Australian Department of Territories had been using the movie as propaganda to promote the cultural assimilation of Aboriginal people.

The movie was produced by the Commonwealth Film Unit. It was premiered on National Aborigines' Day, 14 July 1967 and the next day started playing on multiple television channels to mark the day, airing again in successive years. the Age's Teletopics column said "Clive Williams impressed as an exemplary family man of great inner resources. Though his path to assimilation was a difficult one, the documentary was too consoling. So easy to say: "If he can do it, what's stopping others?" And that's neither the point nor the end of the story."
