= SNAICC =

Indigenous Australian organisation focused on child health and welfare

SNAICC – National Voice for our Children, formerly Secretariat of National Aboriginal and Islander Child Care and usually referred to simply as SNAICC, is an Australian organisation dedicated to the health and wellbeing of Aboriginal and Torres Strait Islander children. As of 2024 Catherine Liddle is CEO of SNAICC.

== History ==
The inaugural Aboriginal Child Survival Seminar was held in Melbourne, Victoria, in 1979. There the attendees proposed the formation of a national peak body to advocate for and represent Aboriginal and Torres Strait Islander children nationally, the main driver being the high rates of removal of Indigenous children from their families by the state and territory child protection systems. Yorta Yorta women Mollie Dyer and her mother Margaret Tucker, who had established the Victorian Aboriginal Child Care Agency in 1976, were instrumental in advocating for the body. The Secretariat of National Aboriginal and Islander Child Care was formally established as a result of the proposal in 1981, and it developed a statement of purpose to outline its mission. In 1982, the first national executive was elected, and from 1983 onwards, SNAICC has received funding from the federal government (initially from the Department of Social Security).

In 1988, SNAICC initiated National Aboriginal and Islander Children's Day, which continues to be celebrated each year on 4 August.

During the 1990s, SNAICC established itself as a key advocate for the welfare of Aboriginal and Torres Strait Islander children. In 1990, in partnership with the Brotherhood of St Laurence, it released the report "Aboriginal Child Poverty: Our Children are Our Future", highlighting the links between child poverty and the critical issues of abuse and neglect, and during the decade published several significant reports. In 1991 SNAICC became the first national Indigenous organisation to call for an inquiry into the Stolen Generations, and in 1996, developed the Proposed Plan of Action for Prevention of Child Abuse and Neglect in Aboriginal Communities. At the second National Aboriginal and Torres Strait Islander Child Survival Conference in Melbourne in 1997, SNAICC strongly recommended that all states and territories adopt the Aboriginal Child Placement Principle.

In the 2000s, SNAICC actively engaged with the United Nations Working Group on Indigenous Populations, contributing to advancements in child protection reforms at both national and global levels. In 2003, SNAICC joined the federal Ministerial Council for Aboriginal and Torres Strait Islander Affairs Family Violence Taskforce, and in 2004 established the SNAICC Resource Service, to develop and disseminate resources for services supporting Indigenous children and families. In 2006, SNAICC signed an agreement with the Australian Government for a National Indigenous Child Care Plan, later endorsed by many key organisations.

SNAICC was a key driver of the establishment of National Standards for Out-of-Home Care in 2010. It continued to work internationally, attending UN sessions in New York City and Geneva, and secured funding for the "Kids Matter: Early Childhood" initiative. It also produced further reports and introduced a model for cultural advice and support. In 2014 SNAICC launched the national "Family Matters" campaign to address the over-representation of Indigenous children in out-of-home care.

In 2016, the Secretariat of National Aboriginal and Islander Child Care registered under the Corporations (Aboriginal and Torres Strait Islander) Act 2006 (CATSI Act), becoming "SNAICC – National Voice for our Children". In 2018 SNAICC played a critical role in influencing the Closing the Gap Refresh. As a member of the Coalition of Peaks Joint Council, SNAICC collaborated to establish critical targets for children's health and safety.

Through the COVID-19 pandemic in Australia in 2020-21, SNAICC continued to help to develop the inaugural National Aboriginal and Torres Strait Islander Early Childhood Strategy and "Safe and Supported: the National Framework for Protecting Australia’s Children" (2021-31), as well as helping to advance the new National Agreement on Closing the Gap.

== Aims and functions ==
SNAICC follows principles of self-determination and community control to improve the lives of Indigenous children and families in Australia. It provides advice to child protection and early childhood education bodies, and helps to develop guidelines, propose policies to achieve real and lasting change for the children and their families. As well as liaising with the Commonwealth and state governments, SNAICC also works with non-Indigenous services that are involved in providing services to Indigenous families.

SNAICC releases annual Family Matters Reports (since 2016, online since 2021) and organises a National Week of Action.

SNAICC has always aimed "to drive sustained positive systemic and institutional change at the top level".

== Notable people ==
Doreen Coller was on the initial steering committee.

Jenny Munro was one of the earliest chairs of SNAICC.

Marjorie Thorpe, daughter of Alma Thorpe and mother of politician Lidia Thorpe, was coordinator of SNAICC as well as director of the Victorian Aboriginal Child Care Agency.

Heather Kemarre Shearer, a member of the South Australian Stolen Generations, was secretary of SNAICC at some point. Before that, she was Secretary of the South Australian Aboriginal Child Care Agency in 1978, and was later a coordinator of the Alice Springs Aboriginal Child Care Agency.

From 1998 to 2008 Muriel Bamblett was chair, and was again chair as of 2023.

Catherine Liddle was appointed CEO commencing 8 February 2021, and remains in the position as of August 2024.

== Impact ==
SNAICC's work and reports are often reported in news outlets.

== Conferences ==
The 2007 SNAICC National Conference was held in Adelaide, South Australia. In July 2010, the SNAICC National Conference was held in Alice Springs, NT.

The 5th National Conference was held in Cairns, Queensland, in June 2013. It was addressed by Megan Mitchell, National Children's Commissioner.

The 6th National Conference was held in Perth, Western Australia, in 2015.

The 8th National Conference was held in Adelaide, South Australia, in September 2019. Aboriginal and Torres Strait Islander Social Justice Commissioner June Oscar addressed the conference.

The 10th National Conference was held in Darwin in September 2023, and there were over 1500 attendees. Notable speakers included Judge Frances Eivers, former Aotearoa New Zealand Children's Commissioner, Lead Convenor of the Coalition of Peaks Pat Turner, and leader of the Yes campaign for the Indigenous Voice to Parliament, Dean Parkin. Nooky and J-Milla performed at the conference.

== Significant publications ==
SNAICC has authored and/or published a large number of reports, periodicals, and books. These include:

- Through Black Eyes: Family Violence Resource Handbook (1992 and later editions)
- State of Denial (2002), focusing on the Northern Territory, leading to increased resources being allocated tor the NT child welfare system
- Footprints to where we are : a resource manual for Aboriginal and Torres Strait Islander children's services (2005)
- Working and walking together : supporting Family Relationship Services to work with Aboriginal and Torres Strait Islander families and organisations (2010)
- Growing up our way : Aboriginal and Torres Strait Islander child rearing practices matrix (2012)
- "Family Matters Report" (annually since 2016, online since 2021)

It also produces a newsletter.
