= Flora and Fauna Act myth =

Urban myth about the rights of Indigenous Australians before 1967

The "Flora and Fauna Act" myth is a belief often repeated in public debate that Indigenous Australians were classified as fauna by legislation, specifically under a “Flora and Fauna Act”, and managed as such by the Australian and State Governments, and that the legislation and practice was overturned by a change to the Australian Constitution implemented by the 1967 referendum about Aboriginal affairs.

A fact check conducted by ABC News in 2018 found "Aboriginal people in Australia have never been covered by a flora and fauna act, either under federal or state law". Law professor Helen Irving has identified the "Flora and Fauna Act" myth as part of a series of myths about the 1967 referendum and the evolution of Aboriginal civil rights in general.

== Notable incidents ==
In 2003, Linda Burney, the first Aboriginal woman elected to the New South Wales Legislative Assembly and Australian House of Representatives, incorrectly claimed in her maiden speech that she had spent the first ten years of her life under the Flora and Fauna Act. Burney's comments led to the increased proliferation of the "Flora and Fauna Act" myth.

In 2018, actress Shareena Clanton claimed that her mother "was not considered a human being until the referendum came through from the Flora and Fauna Act in 1967". In July 2020, the Australian Broadcasting Corporation (ABC) published an interview with Victor Bartley, a Wiradjuri man, in which he claimed that he had "received a letter back stating I was exempt from national service because I was Indigenous under the National Flora and Fauna Act ... to this day I still don't know if I'm a kangaroo or a flower".

In 2023, as part of the Indigenous Voice referendum Yes campaign, Adam Goodes stated his mother was part of the Flora and Fauna Act.

== Origin ==
Academic and indigenous rights activist Marcia Langton, in speaking to the ABC, said she first heard the term "Flora and Fauna Act" mentioned by filmmaker Lester Bostock at a council meeting in Canberra in the 1970s. Langton stated that she believed Bostock meant it in a metaphorical sense and she "had no idea that this would grow into the urban myth that it is today". She went on to say "We were not classified under the 'flora and fauna act' but we were treated as animals."

The New South Wales National Parks and Wildlife Act 1974 and similar acts in other states may have encouraged the development of the myth, as they included Aboriginal heritage sites in their purview. Before the creation of separate indigenous affairs departments, some states administered the area through combined departments that also dealt with wildlife. For example, Western Australia had a Department of Aborigines and Fisheries (1909–1920) and the federal government had a Department of the Environment, Aborigines and the Arts (1971–1972).

== See also ==
- 1967 Australian referendum (Aboriginals)
