= Clive Andrew Williams =

Aboriginal Australian leader (1915–1980)

- Born: 22 February 1915 (most likely); Casino, New South Wales
- Died: 1 December 1980; Lismore
- Resting place: buried in Goonellabah cemetery
- Organization: Tranby Co-operative College for Aborigines. Sydney Aborigines Progressive Association. Federal Council for the Advancement of Aborigines and Torres Strait Islanders (FCAATSI).
- Known for: Activism for aboriginal Australian matters
- Spouse: Ida Drew
- Children: 3 sons, 6 daughters

Clive Andrew Williams (1915–1980) was an Aboriginal Australian political activist.

== Early life ==
As a child he was one of the very few aboriginal people to be accepted into Casino Intermediate High School.

== Political activism ==
During the 1960s Williams became involved with the Tranby Co-operative College for Aborigines at Glebe, Sydney, where he worked with religious leader William Alfred Clint. During this time Williams was elected as the vice-preside of the Sydney Aborigines Progressive Association.

According to the Australian Dictionary of Biography, Williams joined the Aboriginal-Australian Fellowship, and was an attendee of the annual conferences of the Federal Council for the Advancement of Aborigines and Torres Strait Islanders (FCAATSI).

In 1967 Williams was given a prominent role in the movie One Man's Road in which he and his wife shared stories of their lives. The movie was produced by the Commonwealth Film Unit. Upon the film's release, Williams discovered that the Australian Department of Territories had been using the movie as propaganda to promote the cultural assimilation of Aboriginal people.

Later in life Williams was a member of a council of elders which worked with the Northern Rivers College of Advanced Education on matters of Aboriginal recognition, especially the Bundjalung people.

Williams died of myocardial infarction in 1980. After his death, one of his daughters followed in his footsteps and became an aboriginal cultural activist like her father.
