= Federal Council for the Advancement of Aborigines and Torres Strait Islanders =

Former Australian agency

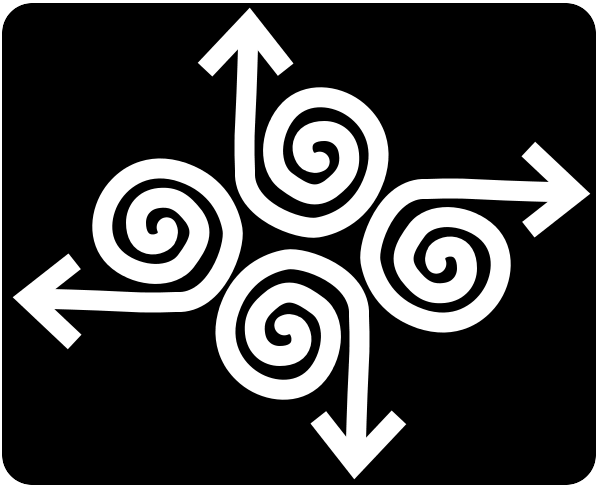
- Logo of the FCAATSI
- Abbreviation: FCAATSI
- Formation: 16 February 1958
- Founded at: Adelaide, South Australia, Australia
- Dissolved: 1978; 48 years ago
- Purpose: Indigenous Rights Activism
- Headquarters: Adelaide, South Australia (1958–?); Melbourne, Victoria (pre-1967); Sydney, New South Wales (post-1967)
- Formerly called: Federal Council for Aboriginal Advancement (FCAA)

The Federal Council for the Advancement of Aborigines and Torres Strait Islanders (FCAATSI), founded in Adelaide, South Australia, as the Federal Council for Aboriginal Advancement (FCAA) on 16 February 1958, was a civil rights organisation which campaigned for the welfare of Aboriginal Australians and Torres Strait Islanders, and the first national body representing Aboriginal interests. It was influential in lobbying in favour of the 1967 Referendum on Aboriginal Australians. It was renamed to National Aboriginal and Islander Liberation Movement (NAILM) in the early to mid 1970s, before disbanding in 1978.

== Background ==
The idea of uniting Aboriginal rights groups in order to form a united lobbying forces had existed for some time, fuelled by periodic concern for the plight of Indigenous Australians; however two occurrences in the mid-1950s encouraged renewed discussion of the issue. The Anti-Slavery and Aborigines' Protection Society, based in London, began planning to approach the United Nations on behalf of Australian Aboriginal people, accompanied by an information gathering visit of Australia by Lady Jessie Street. At the same time, public concern was raised over living conditions among nomadic Aboriginal peoples (specifically the Wongi peoples) living on the Warburton Ranges following the publication of a report and a subsequent film shot by Bill Grayden and Douglas Nicholls, called Manslaughter. The series of events which became known as the Warburton Ranges controversy ignited public concern and outrage, leading to lobbying of parliamentarians and other activism by both Indigenous and non-Indigenous people.

These events motivated activist Shirley Andrews to begin planning a meeting of concerned parties in 1957.

== History ==
=== Foundation (1958) ===
From 14 February to 16 February 1958, a meeting was held in Willard Hall, in Wakefield Street, Adelaide, attended by 12 delegates from nine Aboriginal rights and welfare leagues and 12 observers. The meeting culminated in the foundation of the Federal Council for Aboriginal Advancement, designed to unite existing lobby groups, with a goal to help "the Aboriginal people of Australia to become self-reliant, self-supporting members of the community". Among others, Labor Party MP for the Division of Wills in Victoria, Gordon Bryant, who was president of the Aborigines Advancement League (AAL) from 1957 to 1964, was a founding member.

This was the first national body representing Aboriginal interests. Longtime campaigner for Aboriginal rights and one of the oldest delegates and then president of the Aborigines Advancement League of South Australia, Charles Duguid, was elected as the first president. Only groups which had "earned themselves the right to be considered seriously as organisations fighting on behalf of Aborigines" and some newer groups which had proven worthy were invited. Different lobby groups focussed on different aspects of Aboriginal welfare or rights and members varied in composition, but they all desired to effect change. It was hard to measure success, but all contributed to changing public opinion to an acceptance that Aboriginal people deserved rights.

To this aim, five key principles were established:

- Equal citizenship rights with other Australian citizens
- An adequate standard of living equivalent to that expected by other Australians
- Equal pay for equal work and the same industrial protection as for other Australians
- Free and compulsory education for detribalised Aborigines
- The absolute retention of all remaining native reserves, with native communal or individual ownership

It was a significant milestone to bring together the disparate groups under an umbrella organisation. The Aborigines Advancement League of South Australia sought to disaffiliate from the FCAA from about 1959 onwards, achieving this in 1966, because it thought the federal organisation too focussed on the state of Victoria.

=== Expansion and name change (1958–1966) ===
In the early 1960s, FCAA administration was being run from AAL president Gordon Bryant's electorate office in Coburg, Victoria.

The Cairns-based Aborigines and Torres Strait Islanders Advancement League was established in January 1960, and affiliated with the FCAA shortly afterwards. The Northern Territory Council for Aboriginal Rights (NTCAR) was founded in 1961, with their constitution based on sister organisation Council for Aboriginal Rights (CAR) in Victoria, only with an extra requirement that 75 per cent of executive members had to be of Aboriginal descent. The first president was Jacob Roberts, succeeded by Phillip Roberts in 1962. It became an affiliate of FCAA during that year, tipping the voting balance in favour of the left-wing Aboriginal affiliates, the others being CAR (Victoria), the Aboriginal-Australian Fellowship (New South Wales) and the Queensland Council for the Advancement of Aborigines and Torres Strait Islanders (QCAATSI) based in Brisbane. The Methodist Commission on Aboriginal Affairs, under John Jago, was the only Christian organisation to join the FCAA. Jago was a member of the executive for two years.

In July 1963, the FCAA sponsored Gordon Bryant and WA Labor politician Kim Beazley Sr. on a visit to Yirrkala, to investigate Yolngu complaints about a mining company being granted licence to explore for bauxite on their traditional land. This led to the Yirrkala bark petitions being presented to the Australian Parliament in August 1963, and a committee being set up to investigate their grievances.

The organisation grew in numbers, especially among Aboriginal and Torres Strait Islander people. From the original 25 founding members, the organisation's membership grew to 220 in 1965; over the same time frame, the number of Aboriginal members grew from 4 to 65. From 1963, an annual conference was held in Canberra, Capital Territory, attracting delegates from 65 affiliated organisations, with one third of attendees at the conference in 1970 being Indigenous. At that time, Joe McGinness was president. Gordon Bryant (then vice-president) and Victorian AAL activist Stan Davey attended the inaugural three-day conference held in Canberra over the Easter weekend (mid-April 1963), at which Aboriginal people were given a platform to speak. Nurse and activist Isobelle Mary Ferguson, as honorary secretary of the Aboriginal Affairs Association, read that organisation's report at the conference. At the conference, FCAA resolved to write to the Yolngu people of Yirrkala, through mission superintendent Edgar Wells, in order to find out their feelings about the proposed mining of bauxite on their traditional lands on the Gove Peninsula, in Arnhem Land, Northern Territory. The conference was given page one coverage by Tribune, the official organ of the Communist Party of Australia.

In 1964, the organisation's remit was expanded to include Torres Strait Islanders, and the name was therefore changed to the "Federal Council for the Advancement of Aborigines and Torres Strait Islanders".

Joe McGinness was the first Aboriginal president of FCAATSI in 1961, remaining in the position until the end of the organisation for all but one year. Stan Davey (who was also active in the AAL) was general secretary for ten years.

From the early 1960s, Winnie Branson attended the national conference in Canberra as a member of the Adelaide Delegation, becoming the first South Australian state secretary of FCAATSI in early 1967 and holding the position until 1971.

=== 1967 Referendum ===
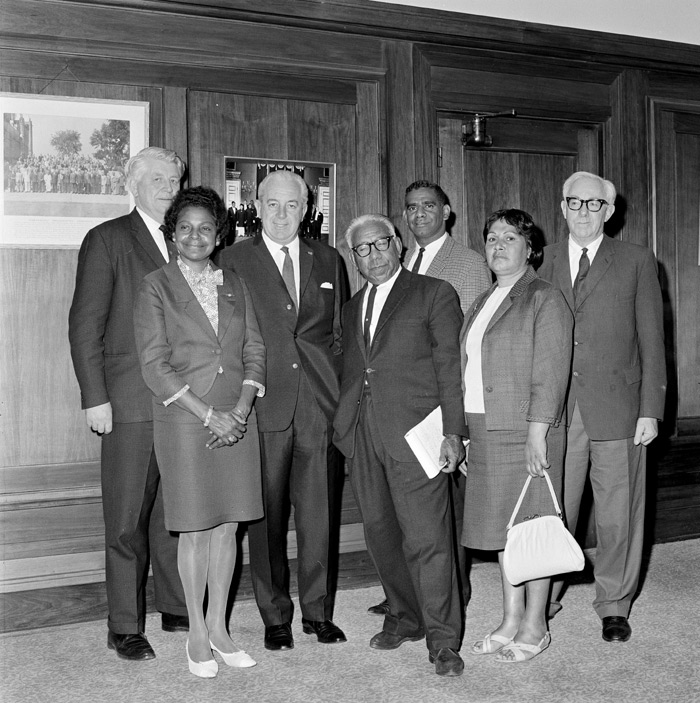
Gordon Bryant (left), Harold Holt, and Bill Wentworth (right) meeting with FCAATSI representatives – from left to right, Faith Bandler, Douglas Nicholls, Burnum Burnum, and Winnie Branson, February 1967

In 1962, a national campaign was launched, following a petition raised to a national level based on work done by the Council for Aboriginal Rights (CAR) in Melbourne, in order to push for a more active involvement in Aboriginal affairs at a Commonwealth level. By the end of the year, the petition had over 100,000 signatures, and after continuous lobbying, members of the council were able to meet with Prime Minister Robert Menzies in 1965. This meeting was considered to have been crucial in the change in government attitude.

Winnie Branson, along with Faith Bandler, Douglas Nicholls, and Burnum Burnum, met with Prime Minister Harold Holt and MPs Gordon Bryant and William Wentworth in Canberra prior to the 1967 referendum.

The hugely successful 1967 Referendum gave the Australian Parliament the power to legislate for Aboriginal peoples.

=== Aboriginal membership debate (1967–1970) ===
The 1967 Referendum was seen as a major success for Aboriginal rights; however it signalled an end of unity in the FCAATSI. Allegations were made that the organisation was not representative of Indigenous peoples, as the Executive Council had a white majority. This eventually led to the resignation of the General Secretary, Stan Davey, as well as two other high-ranking Aboriginal executives, Oodgeroo Noonuccal and Charles Perkins. Faith Bandler took over as acting General Secretary, moving the headquarters to Sydney in the process.

Discontent with the lack of involvement of Indigenous members in the leadership of the organisation was accompanied with questioning of the focus on a common struggle between different races. The emerging alternative opinion was that the time had come for Indigenous peoples to take full control of lobbying efforts and base their agenda solely on Indigenous matters. The "Report on Aboriginal and European Leadership in FCAATSI", written by Barrie Pittock and published in the council's Annual Report of 1968, expresses this desire for more Indigenous leadership, and echoes discontent that this has not been sufficiently met:

[T]here is a basic need to have Aborigines as spokesmen for their own people; and I believe that while this organization, and this Executive, have sought to encourage Aboriginal leadership, we have not done it.

— A.B. Pittock, "Report on Aboriginal and European Leadership in FCAATSI"

=== National Tribal Council ===
This division came to a head in the Annual Conference of 1970, in which motions were tabled proposing a restriction on membership and voting rights to Indigenous members. The failure of these motions led to their proponents leaving the organisation, resulting in the formation of the National Tribal Council by Kath Walker (later known as Oodgeroo Noonuccal) and Douglas Nicholls, comprising around 40 members. They drew up an interim constitution, which allowed for two classes of membership, with full membership only available to Aboriginal or Islander people. Walker became national chair, while other involved included her son Denis Walker; journalist John Newfong; Chicka Dixon; and Barrie Pittock. Gary Foley, Naomi Mayers, and Bruce McGuinness were also involved.

The National Tribal Council lasted three years before disbanding.

=== Decline and demise (1970–1978) ===
The dream of an Indigenous-controlled council was finally realised in 1973. However, with an increase in the number of non-affiliated organisations campaigning for Indigenous rights, and the formation of the Department of Aboriginal Affairs and the National Aboriginal Consultative Committee (later National Aboriginal Conference) by the federal government, the importance of the FCAATSI diminished.

Marcia Langton was elected general secretary in 1977, and moved to Canberra to take up the post.

FCAATSI eventually changed its name to the National Aboriginal and Islander Liberation Movement (NAILM) to reflect its change in focus, but when state funding was removed in 1978, the organisation disbanded.

== Notable members ==
- Claude "Candy" Williams (1929–1983).
- Clive Andrew Williams (1915–1980).

== See also ==
- Aboriginal Australians
- Australian referendum, 1967 (Aboriginals)
- Indigenous land rights in Australia
- Native title in Australia
- Self-determination of Australian Aborigines
- Torres Strait Islanders
