= Bill Onus =

Aboriginal Australian activist

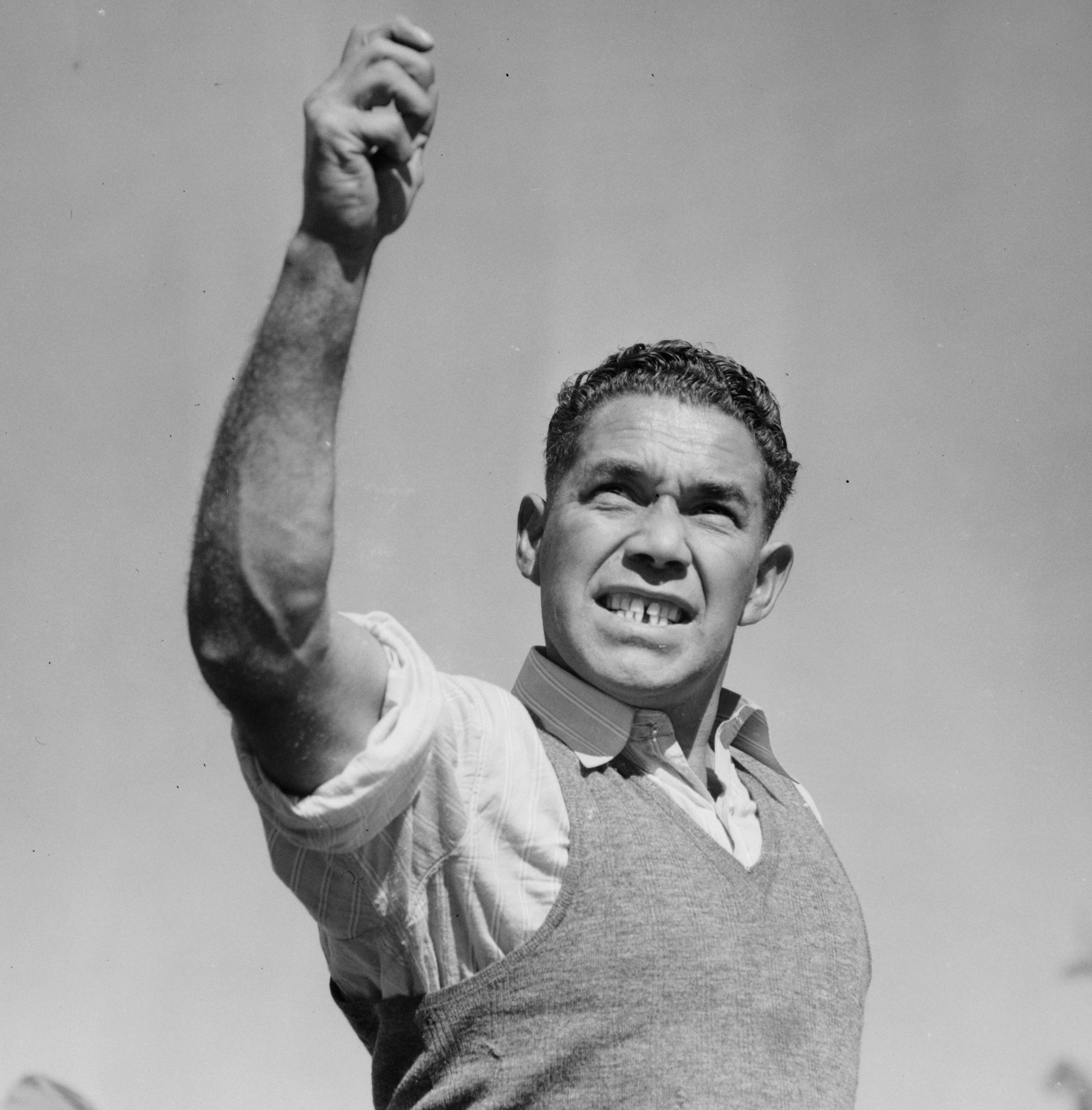
- Bill Onus, 1941
- Born: William Townsend Onus; 15 November 1906; Cummeragunja Reserve, Australia
- Died: 10 January 1968 (aged 61); Deepdene, Melbourne, Australia
- Known for: Indigenous rights activism
- Children: Lin Onus

William Townsend Onus Jnr (15 November 1906 – 10 January 1968) was an Aboriginal Australian political activist, designer, and showman, also known for his boomerang-throwing skills. He was father of artist Lin Onus.

== Early life and education ==
Onus was born on 15 November 1906 at the Cummeragunja Aboriginal Reserve in New South Wales, the eldest child of William Townsend Onus Snr and Maud Mary Onus, née Nelson, from Framlingham, Victoria. His father was of Wiradjuri background and his mother of the Yorta Yorta people, and he had a brother, Eric, (Note: Eric wrote and narrated the first song ever recorded by the Country Outcasts (comprising Harry & Wilga Williams and others), "Nullarbor Prayer", over several days in a studio in Currabubula, NSW.) and a sister, Maude, known as "Sissy". In 1916, in a time when many people were leaving Cummeragunja owing to land being taken and children being forcibly removed, Maude also left, moving to nearby Echuca, in Victoria.

Bill grew up along with several other people destined to become advocates for and leaders of their people: Doug Nicholls, John (Jack) Patten, and Margaret Tucker. He was educated at Thomas Shadrach James' mission school in Cummeragunja as well as spending two years at school in Echuca from the age of ten.

In 1918 the family followed his father to the Riverina, where William Snr worked as a drover.

== Working life and activism ==
In 1922, the age of 16, Onus left home to become a shearer, which he pursued for seven years.

In 1929 he moved to Sydney, where he initially worked at the Bankstown Aerodrome as a rigger. During the Great Depression Onus took a number of jobs, including prospecting down the coast at Bega, and truck-driving upon his return to Sydney in 1934. He lived at the Salt Pan Creek camp in south-western Sydney, where refugees from the north and south coast and Cummeragunja lived, including Jack Patten, Jack Campbell, and Pearl Gibbs.

In 1936, Onus appeared in Charles Chauvel's feature film Uncivilised, then in 1937 had an acting role in Ken G.Hall's romantic melodrama Lovers and Luggers (retitled Vengeance of the Deep in the US and UK).

In 1939, Onus joined the Aborigines Progressive Association (APA), later becoming secretary and becoming a full-time employee of the association, described as "an uncompromising radical". He was then living in the Sydney suburb of Newtown. He established the Moree branch of the APA, and was involved in the Committee for Aboriginal Citizen Rights (associated with the Australian Labor Party), which was attempting to reform the Aborigines Welfare Board of New South Wales. In Redfern, where many families were arriving and settling, he organised fund-raising weekly dances. The funds were used for legal aid for Aboriginal war veterans, as well as the Redfern All Blacks rugby league team, co-founded in 1938 with Wesley Simms.

In 1939 he returned home to take part in the Cummeragunja walk-off, which was one of the earliest mass protests of Indigenous Australians.

Upon moving to Northern Territory for the filming of Harry Watt's classic film The Overlanders in 1945, Onus saw Aboriginal stockmen being treated violently and being chained up.

From 1946, Onus re-joined his parents in the Melbourne suburb of Fitzroy, this time working as a shipping clerk. He met his second wife, Mary Kelly, at a Communist Party of Australia rally during this period. He also joined forces with pastor and later co-founder of the Aborigines Advancement League (AAL) Doug Nicholls, and with his brother Eric, the three travelled widely, using public rallies, community meetings, and the media to advocate for Aboriginal rights. They organised support for the Pilbara strike in Western Australia, and protests against the Woomera rocket testing range in South Australia.

In 1949 Onus addressed a crowd at The Domain in Sydney with Bill Ferguson and Reg Saunders. He considered standing for federal parliament (as Ferguson did), but did not go ahead. The AAL was also involved in the push to retain Lake Tyers Mission, an Aboriginal reserve, and in 1963 he and his brother Eric Onus organised a march in Melbourne. They later teamed up with Stan Davey to form the Save Lake Tyers Committee, which eventually resulted in the first successful land rights claim in Victoria, when in 1971 Lake Tyers was returned to the traditional owners.

Activists started utilising Aboriginal culture as a form of activism, and Onus played a big part in many types of performance.

In the 1950s he joined the protest against British nuclear tests at Maralinga. When he intended to travel to the United States to talk about Indigenous rights in Australia, with relation to the civil rights movement there, his passport was suddenly cancelled. It later emerged that ASIO had handed his file to the US embassy.

Onus became a leader of Aboriginal Victorians in the fight for the "yes" vote in the 1967 referendum for over a decade, as the first Aboriginal president of the Aborigines Advancement League (AAL), and in the same year became a representative on the Victorian Aboriginal Welfare Board.

He was the first Aboriginal Justice of the Peace.

== As a showman and entrepreneur ==
During the 1940s and 1950s Onus became famous for his skill at boomerang-throwing, performing at various tourist sites in Victoria and NSW, and also toured New Zealand.

Working from home he began a new career as a businessman, selling Aboriginal art. After a serious road accident in 1952 disabled him for a year, he was afterwards able to use the compensation money to establish Aboriginal Enterprises, a business selling Aboriginal art and souvenirs in Belgrave, Victoria. He was able to open branches at Port Augusta, South Australia (1964), and at Narbethong, Victoria (c.1965). They sold bark paintings from Arnhem Land as well as artefacts, furniture, textiles, and pottery produced locally. His businesses provided training and employment to many Aboriginal people (as well as non-Aboriginal), including family members: brother Eric became manager of the Narbethong branch with his wife Winnie; sister Maude (Sissy) and several of her sons (James Onus, and Joe, Bruce, Dennis and John McGuinness); his son Lin; daughter Isobel and her son Warren (Woz) Owens.

== Performance and filmmaking ==
In August 1946, Onus was involved in a production called White Justice about the Pilbara strike, co-produced by the AAL and Melbourne's New Theatre in Flinders Street, Melbourne. An excerpt from the play, which featured Eric Onus and his wife Wynne, Reg Saunders, Doug Nicholls, and many then-residents of Fitzroy, was captured on 35mm film by Bill Onus, making him possibly the first Aboriginal filmmaker (an accolade formerly assumed to belong to his nephew Bruce McGuinness for his 1972 film Blackfire). The nine and a half minute film was only rediscovered in 2021, having never been released (possibly due to pressures exerted on potential distributors by ASIO) and ended up in the National Film and Sound Archive years later. It features in his grandson Tirki Onus's film Ablaze, about his grandfather.

In 1949, Onus organised an Indigenous revue which brought together traditional ceremonies and acts with more contemporary acts and Indigenous artists. The revue was called Corroboree 1949 and was performed in Melbourne at Wirth's Olympia (the present site of the Victorian Arts Centre). The acts included Margaret Tucker, Edgar Bux, Miss Georgie Lee, May Lovett, Joyce McKinnon, Ted "Chook" Mullett and his Gum Street Band.

In February 1951, Onus shamed the Victorian Government for excluding Aboriginal people from jubilee celebrations planned that year, causing them to allocate £2000 plus the services of non-indigenous professionals, including theatre director Irene Mitchell, scriptwriter Jean Campbell and set designer Dres Hardingham. An Aboriginal Moomba: Out of the Dark was staged with great success over five nights and a matinee performance in June 1951 at the Princess Theatre, Melbourne, with actors paid out of AAL funds. Organised by Onus and Doug Nicholls, the revue included Indigenous opera singer Harold Blair and Indigenous blues singer Georgia Lee in the line-up. Onus also presented artist Albert Namatjira and actor Robert Tudawali to showcase Aboriginal culture.

As a result of the success of the revue, in 1955 Onus suggested the name for the Moomba festival in Melbourne. He said that it means "let's get together and have fun", although this meaning has been disputed.

=== Documentaries ===
Onus had roles in several Australian feature fiction films, including:

- Uncivilised (1936)
- Lovers and Luggers (1937) (retitled Vengeance of the Deep in the US and UK)
- The Overlanders (1946)

In the 1950s and 1960s, Onus started using 8mm film (the home movie format), filming local tourists as well as visiting celebrities. This included footage of Jamaican singer Harry Belafonte learning how to throw a boomerang at Aboriginal Enterprises.

He became well known for presenting ABC Television's 12-part children's series, Alcheringa in 1962, which recognised and showcased Aboriginal culture. He also contributed to the associated Alcheringa book series (1963–1969) published by Rigby Ltd in Adelaide.

He appeared with Doug Nicholls in the nine-minute-long documentary Forgotten People (1967), produced by the Aborigines Advancement League.

Onus features as the subject of the 82-minute film Ablaze, made by his grandson, opera singer Tiriki Onus, co-directed with Alec Morgan (director of the documentary Lousy Little Sixpence (1983)), premiering in the Melbourne International Film Festival in August 2021, after six years in the making. The film was released in Australian cinemas in May 2022. The film also starred Uncle Jack Charles, and won an AWGIE Award for "Documentary – Broadcast or Exhibition". The documentary suggests that the film company that produced Onus' film was put under political pressure to drop it.

== Death, family and legacy ==
Onus died in 1968 of a coronary occlusion.

His business enterprises had created a model for cultural maintenance, and helped to foster and rebuild Aboriginal social cohesion and cultural pride, and his actions contributed to "projecting a new and distinctive contemporary Aboriginal presence in south-eastern Australia".

Onus married Bella Elizabeth Patten on 12 May 1928 at St Andrew's Presbyterian Church in West Wyalong, in the Riverina region. She was the sister of Jack Patten, who led the Cummeragunja walk-off in 1939. They had two daughters, Christine (1928–1951) and Isobel (1930–c. 1976), before getting divorced in 1941. One of Christine's daughters is Christine Donnelly, founder and as of 2022 still director of the Aboriginal Dance Theatre Redfern; the other, Aiyisha, is also involved in the visual and performing arts. Isobel's son is Warren "Woz" Owens, an actor.

On 10 June 1947, in Melbourne, he married Mary McLintock Kelly, a Scot, after meeting at a Communist Party rally. Her parents, although disapproving of the marriage, had a house built for them next door to them, at 33 Terry Street, Deepdene. Their child, artist Lin Onus was born on 4 December 1948). Lin's children are Kenneth and Biralee from his first marriage, and Tiriki Onus from his second marriage, an artist, opera singer, and filmmaker.

Writer, filmmaker, and activist Bruce McGuinness is a nephew of Bill Onus.

== Recognition ==
After his death, there has been a greater appreciation of Onus' work and achievements. His work has been showcased in exhibitions such as Making a show of it (subtitled Indigenous entertainers and entrepreneurs in 1950s Melbourne; held in Melbourne in 2008) and Modern Times: the untold story of Modernism in Australia (Heide Museum of Modern Art, 2009). Other examples are held in the collections of the National Museum of Australia, Australian Museum, Powerhouse Museum, and South Australian Museum.
