= Shirley Andrews =

Australian biochemist, dancer and activist

Shirley Andrews OAM
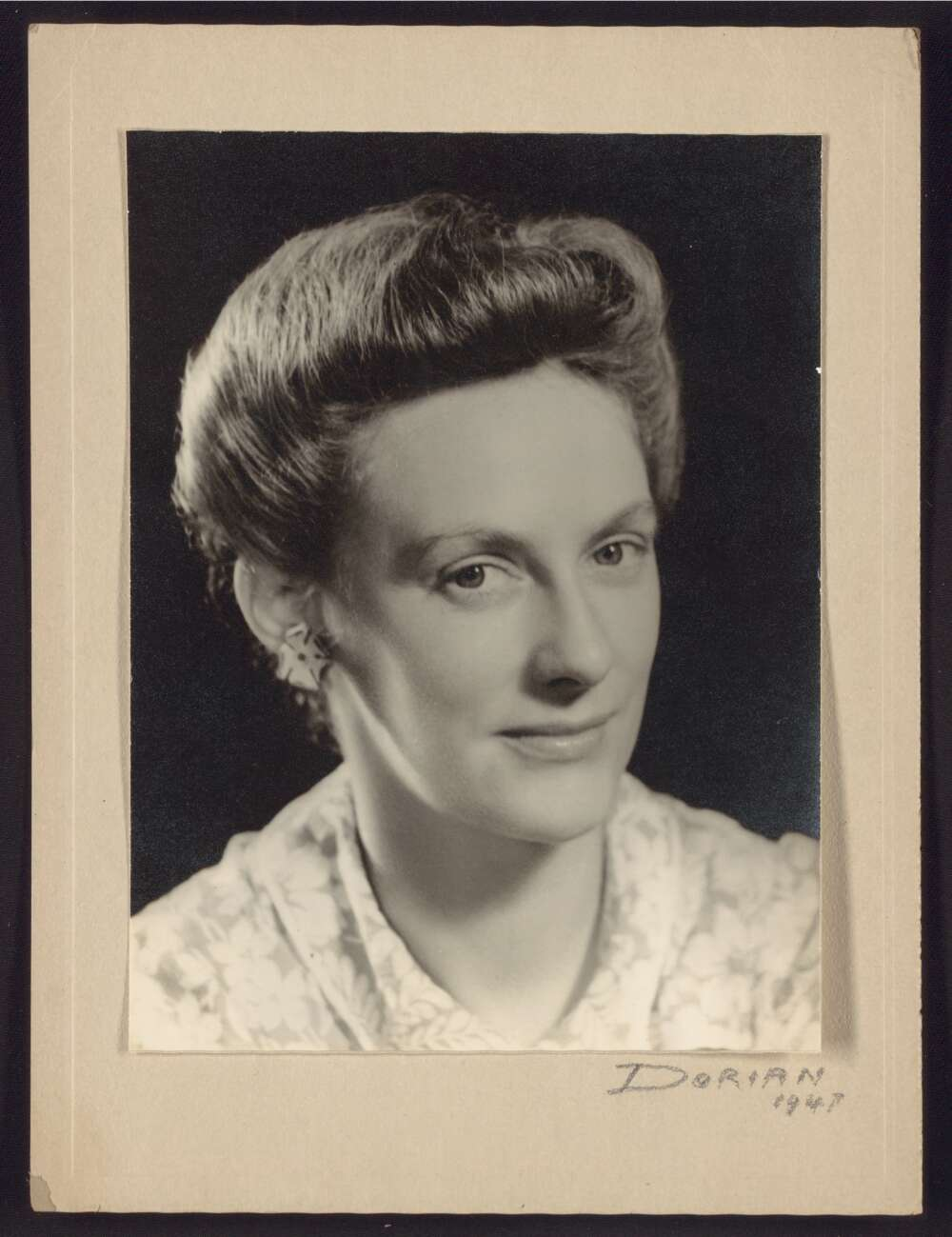
- Andrews in 1947
- Born: 5 November 1915; Melbourne, Australia
- Died: 15 September 2001 (aged 85)
- Education: University of Melbourne (B.Sc.)
- Occupations: Biochemist, dancer, researcher, activist
- Known for: Australian folk dance Aboriginal rights activism
- Notable work: Take Your Partners; Two Hundred Years of Dancing
- Parent(s): Doris & Arthur Andrews
- Honours: Medal of the Order of Australia

Shirley Aldythea Marshall Seymour Andrews OAM (5 November 1915 – 15 September 2001) was an Australian biochemist, dancer, researcher, and Aboriginal rights activist.

== Early life and education ==
Shirley Aldythea Andrews, also known as Shirley Aldythea Seymour Marshall and Shirley Seymour, was born on 5 November 1915, to Doris Andrews and Arthur Andrews. Andrews grew up in Sandringham, Victoria, living with her mother, grandmother, and uncle. She attended school at Miss Montford's school, in Sandringham, until the age of eleven. Later, she boarded at St Michael's Grammar in St Kilda, Victoria.

After graduating from St Michael's, Andrews enrolled in a science course at the University of Melbourne, from 1934 to 1937. In her first years at university she rented houses and apartments with her mother in the Melbourne area.

Andrews also began to learn ballet during her time at university. She took lessons from Edouard Borovansky and later became interested in Australian folk dance. Andrews helped establish the folk dance society and the Victorian folk music club, meanwhile continuing her studies at university. She wrote a book on traditional dancing in Australia.

After completing her Bachelor of Science degree, Andrews was offered a Caroline Kay scholarship to the veterinary school at Melbourne University. After accepting the scholarship offer, Andrews worked at the Veterinary School for six years, doing biochemical testing on animal tissue and fluids.

== Career ==
Following her time at Melbourne University, Andrews joined the CSIRO (Commonwealth Scientific and Industrial Research Organisation) in 1947, as a research officer. Later on, the organisation (CSIRO) became aware of a relationship that had developed between Andrews and Bill Bird, the secretary of the Seamen's Union. The ASIO (Australian Security Intelligence Organisation) informed the CSIRO of the connection, causing Andrews to find it difficult to continue her works at the organisation. Andrews left the CSIRO in 1953.

After leaving CSIRO, in 1953 Andrews was hired by John Cade to run the clinical laboratory at the Royal Park Psychiatric Hospital in Victoria. Her title was Senior Biochemist. She held this position for over twenty years, leaving in 1977. At Royal Park she tested lithium blood levels using a flame spectrophotometer. She also worked to establish safe methods of using lithium to treat symptoms of manic depressive illness (now bipolar disorder). It was while working in this area that she discovered that bromureide (bromide) drugs — widely used as a tranquilliser at the time — instigated symptoms of mental illness. This led to significant reduction in the use of bromide. In 1965, she published her findings in an article in the Medical Journal of Australia. In 1969, Maurice Serry and Andrews published their research on the estimation of lithium levels in psychiatric patients. She retired from the hospital in 1977.

== Political activity ==
Andrews was active in a number of leftist social organizations over the course of her life. She was a member of the Communist Party of Australia in the 1940s, though she left in 1951 due to dissatisfaction with the Soviet Union.

In 1951, Andrews became a founding member and secretary of the Council for Aboriginal Rights (CAR). The CAR was a confederation striving for equal rights for Aborigines. The CAR also contributed to the establishment of the 1967 referendum, when Australia voted to count Aborigines in the census. Andrews worked tirelessly to provide a political focus on Aboriginal rights for the next 20 years.

== Recognition and honours ==
In 1994 Andrews was awarded the Medal of the Order of Australia (OAM) for "service to folklore through the study of Australian traditional social dancing".

== Personal life ==
Andrews never married and never had children.

Although Andrews preferred to work in the backroom, she was a self-confident leader. She showed these qualities and many more while working throughout her life to make significant changes to Australian society. Andrews referred to herself as a liberated woman and believed strongly in women's rights.

== Works ==
- Take Your Partners
- Two Hundred Years of Dancing, with Peter Ellis

== See also ==
- Aboriginal land rights in Australia
- Federal Council for the Advancement of Aborigines and Torres Strait Islanders
