= Stan Davey =

Australian Aboriginal rights activist

- Born: 20 July 1922; Western Australia
- Died: 22 September 2010 (aged 88); Frankston, Victoria
- Occupation: Aboriginal rights activist
- Known for: Co-founder of Aboriginal Advancement League; founding secretary of FCAATSI
- Children: 4

Stanley Fraser Davey AM (20 July 1922 – 22 September 2010) was a prominent Australian activist and advocate for Aboriginal Australians. He co-founded several advocacy organisations, including the Victorian Aborigines Advancement League, where he was the founding secretary, alongside Pastor Doug Nicholls, and the Federal Council for Aboriginal Advancement.

== Early life and education ==
Stanley Fraser Davey was born in Western Australia on 20 July 1922. He grew up in the Perth suburb of Cottesloe and was a committed Christian, raised as an active member of the Church of Christ.

He studied at the College of the Bible, Glen Iris, in the Melbourne suburb of Glen Iris, graduating in 1947.

== Ministry ==
Davey returned to Perth, and worked as the Western Australian youth director of Churches of Christ for two years. He was ordained as a minister in the Churches of Christ in 1952, and, returning to Melbourne, until 1957 was minister at the church in Ivanhoe. He said that he was drawn to this church, part of the Christian Restoration Movement, (Note: Incorrectly shown in the source as "Reformation Movement".) because of its "policy of autonomous structures" - each church operated independently and democratically, according to the wishes of its congregation. He was for three years secretary of the Victorian Churches of Christ Aborigines' Mission Committee.

In 1956, Davey published a pamphlet titled "Neither Male Nor Female—The Place of Women in the Church", which argued for greater rights and responsibilities for women in leadership roles in the church.

He had started having doubts about the policy of the Menzies government towards Aboriginal Australians, and, following a meeting with Doug Nicholls (who was a Churches of Christ pastor as well as Aboriginal activist), he decided to dedicate his life to the Aboriginal cause. He left his ministry in 1957.

== Activism and career ==
Davey, usually known as Stan, met both Aboriginal activists, such as Joe McGinness, and white Australians who were advocating for Aboriginal people, such as Shirley Andrews, Doris Blackburn, and Labor politician Gordon Bryant. The Victorian Aborigines Advancement League (VAAL; later Aboriginal Advancement League, or AAL) was established in March 1957, with Bryant as founding president, Blackburn as deputy president, Davey as secretary, and Nicholls as field officer.

In 1958 Davey was a co-founder of the Federal Council for Aboriginal Advancement (FCAA; later FCAATSI), and was general secretary for 10 years. This was a non-denominational, non-partisan, multi-racial political advocacy organisation, which acted as an umbrella for 13 existing Aboriginal rights associations. By October 1962, the FCAA had 34 member organisations around the country. It ran out of Bryant's electorate office in Coburg. During these years, he was possibly the most influential non-Indigenous Aboriginal rights activist in the country. In February 1963, the FCAA received a telegram from the Methodist missionary Edgar Wells at Yirrkala, on the Gove Peninsula in Arnhem Land, asking for help for the local Yolŋu people who were about to have their land taken by a bauxite mining company. Davey sent out a press statement on behalf of the FCAA, including to the ABC. This battle led to the Yirrkala bark petitions in that year, and ultimately the Gove land rights case in 1971, the first litigation on native title in Australia, in which the court ruled against the concept of native title for the Yolŋu people. (Note: Later contested and overturned in Commonwealth v Yunupingu in 2025.)

In July 1963, Davey published a pamphlet, titled "Genesis or Genocide? The Aboriginal assimilation policy". This was no. 101 in a series called Provocative Pamphlets, published by the Federal Literature Committee of Churches of Christ in Australia, which voiced "strong and real objections to an assimilation policy which assumes one of the races involved in the process has nothing to contribute to the national character and whose only hope is to 'get lost' in the dominant community".

Davey worked for the FCAA and the Churches of Christ in Australia for around ten years, during which he travelled around Australia to see how Aboriginal people were living. He was paid for some of his work, but much of his time was given voluntarily. In 1965, he supported Don McLeod (another non-Indigenous activist) in advocating for Aboriginal people's access to unemployment benefits, as they were being penalised for not accepting low-paying jobs. In the late 1960s, he invited Yolngu man Daymbalipu (one of the signatories of the Yirrkala bark petitions) to Victoria, to observe first-hand the devastating effects of mining in La Trobe Valley. Daymbalipu stayed with former Yirrkala teacher Ron Croxford.

In 1966, he travelled to Daguragu in the Northern Territory to support Gurindji stockmen during the Wave Hill walk-off.

He also joined brothers Eric and Bill Onus in forming the Save Lake Tyers Committee. Their tireless lobbying led to the first successful land rights claim in Victoria in 1971, when Lake Tyers was returned to the traditional owners.

In 1968 he resigned as the director of the AAL and moved to the Pilbara and Kimberley regions in Western Australia to work directly with Aboriginal communities. He worked for Don McLeod teaching English, and later assisted Aboriginal people in Broome to establish a fishing cooperative. He worked in a number of communities with his second wife Jan Richardson, often living in rough conditions. They worked to improve conditions for the people living in Fitzroy Crossing and Wyndham, being appalled at the treatment of Aboriginal people and the conditions under which they lived. From 1975 until 1980 in Fitzroy Crossing, Davey helped six Aboriginal groups to get incorporated and establish economic independence, while Richardson worked with the women in the camps. During these years in north-western WA, he noted evidence of discrimination against individual Aboriginal people as well as campaigning on rights issues, helped along by his networks built through VAAL and FCAA. The Western Australian Government later recognised the work he had done, especially in Wyndham.

In 1980, Davey moved with his family moved to the Northern Territory, where he worked for the Gurindji people and the Yolngu people of Arnhem Land. From 1988 he worked for the Uniting Church in Darwin, working in community development.

Aged 71 or 72 (1990s), he returned to Wyndham with his wife, where they helped to establish alcohol rehabilitation services upon being requested to do so by the Oombulgurri Community.

=== Other work ===
In around 1959, Davey started working as a high school teacher with the Victorian Education Department, where he stayed for several years.

Aged nearly 50 (around 1971), he undertook hard physical work as a wharfie and as a labourer in Western Australia. After gaining a reputation as a bit of a troublemaker for standing up for Aboriginal people, he was often denied work.

== Honours ==
He was appointed a Member of the Order of Australia (AM) for his work for Aboriginal peoples in the 1999 Australia Day Honours.

== Personal life and death ==
Davey first married Joan, and they had two children. He later married Dr Jan Richardson, and they had two children.

When working in Wyndham in his 70s, he had to leave in order to care for Jan after she was seriously injured in a car accident.

On 22 September 2010 Davey died of pneumonia at a nursing home in Frankston, at the age of 88. A funeral service was held for him at the Aborigines Advancement League Hall in Thornbury on 4 October 2010.

In 2022, historian Clare Wright discovered that Davey's ex-wife Joan, then living in Derby, Western Australia, was in possession of the fourth bark petition, which had been given to Davey by Gordon Bryant. Wright met Joan, and she agreed to return the framed document to Yirrkala. After undergoing meticulous preservation measures by Artlab in Adelaide, the document was returned to Yirrkala on 7 December 2023. The handover ceremony was attended by Davey's son, Paul, and granddaughter Natalie.
