= Gordon Bryant =

Australian politician (1914–1991)

The Honourable Gordon Bryant
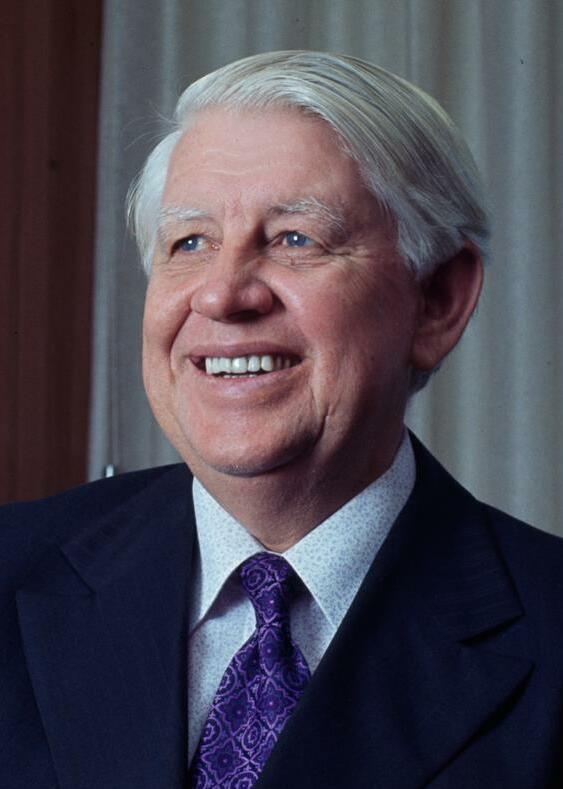
- Bryant in 1973

Minister for the Capital Territory
- In office 9 October 1973 – 11 November 1975
- Prime Minister: Gough Whitlam
- Preceded by: Kep Enderby
- Succeeded by: Reg Withers

Minister for Aboriginal Affairs
- In office 19 December 1972 – 9 October 1973
- Prime Minister: Gough Whitlam
- Preceded by: Peter Howson (Environment, Aborigines and the Arts)
- Succeeded by: Jim Cavanagh

Member of the Australian Parliament for Wills
- In office 10 December 1955 – 19 September 1980
- Preceded by: Bill Bryson
- Succeeded by: Bob Hawke

Personal details
- Born: 3 August 1914 Lismore, Victoria, Australia
- Died: 14 January 1991 (aged 76) Heidelberg, Victoria, Australia
- Party: Labor
- Spouse: Pat
- Education: University of Melbourne
- Occupation: Teacher

Gordon Munro Bryant (3 August 1914 – 14 January 1991) was an Australian politician. He was a member of the Australian Labor Party (ALP) and represented the Division of Wills in Victoria from 1955 to 1980. During this time, he took an active interest in Indigenous land rights in Australia, in particular the case in Yirrkala, Arnhem Land, which led to the Yirrkala bark petitions. He served as Minister for Aboriginal Affairs (1972–1973) and Minister for the Capital Territory (1973–1975) in the Whitlam government.

== Early life and education ==
Gordon Munro Bryant was born on 3 August 1914 in Lismore, Victoria. He was the son of Agnes Keith (née Bain) and Donald Munro Bryant. His father, a storekeeper and farmer, was the nephew of Victorian premier James Munro. He came from a farming family, who were Scots Presbyterians, and allowed no alcohol, smoking, or gambling in the home.

Bryant moved to Baxter as a child and attended Frankston High School, where he excelled academically, and won a mock election in fourth form.

He won a teaching scholarship to Melbourne Teachers' College before the war. After the war, he completed a Bachelor of Arts (Hons.) at the University of Melbourne, graduating BA Hons in 1950.

== Teaching and military service ==
Bryant taught at Callaghan Creek (near Mitta Mitta), Pearcedale, and Mittyack. His teaching career was interrupted by the Second World War.

Bryant had enlisted in the Citizen Military Force in 1934. He was called up for full-time duty in 1942 and was transferred to the Australian Imperial Force (AIF) in January 1943. He remained in Australia until 1945, when he participated in the Battle of Balikpapan as a captain in the 2/33rd Battalion.

He returned to Australia in February 1946, later that year transferring to the Reserve of Officer. While teaching secondary school part-time at Upwey, studied for his BA.

From 1949 to 1961 he continued his CMF service.

== Politics ==
Bryant was elected to Parliament in 1955.

After 17 years in Parliament, Bryant joined the Cabinet of Prime Minister Gough Whitlam, becoming Minister for Aboriginal Affairs in 1972. A year later he became Minister for the Capital Territory. As Minister for Aboriginal Affairs, he was instrumental in the Whitlam government's historic land rights deal with Vincent Lingiari and the Gurindji people.

Bryant retired in 1980, and his electorate was taken over by future Prime Minister Bob Hawke. Bryant had earlier resisted pressure to retire early in order to expedite Hawke's entry to Parliament via a by-election.

=== Indigenous issues ===
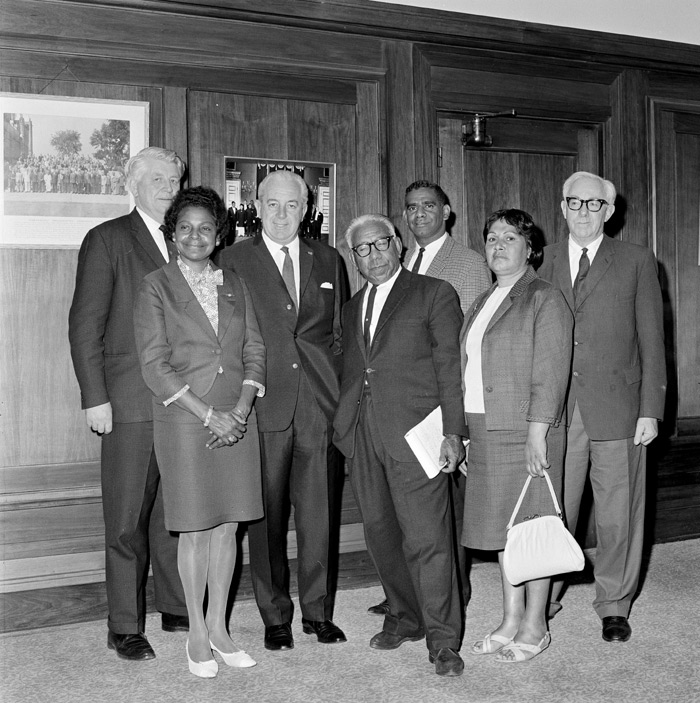
Gordon Bryant (left), Harold Holt, and Bill Wentworth (right) FCAA representatives (l–r) Faith Bandler, Douglas Nicholls, Burnum Burnum, and Winnie Branson, February 1967

A passionate supporter of Indigenous land rights, Bryant was president of the Aborigines Advancement League (AAL) for seven years, from 1957 to 1964. He was also a founding member of the Federal Council for the Advancement of Aborigines (FCAA; later FCAATSI), in 1958, and the FCAA headquarters ran out of his electorate office in Coburg in the early 1960s.

In May 1963 he seconded a motion by Labor MP Kim Beazley Sr. which called on the government to recognise native title. Also in 1963, he advocated for the Yolngu people's rights on the Gove Peninsula, Arnhem Land, in the Northern Territory to be consulted about a mining company mining bauxite on their traditional lands. He and Beazley travelled to Yirrkala to talk to the people living at the mission there. This led to the creation of the Yirrkala bark petitions, which were presented to Parliament in August 1963, now recognised to be the first documents prepared by Indigenous Australians to be recognised by the Australian Parliament. He worked closely with fellow Victorian, Aboriginal rights advocate Stan Davey, in this. Bryant lodged an objection granting mining leases at Yirrkala mining leases, the case being taken up in court by the people in 1968, known as the Gove land rights case.

In 1967, Bryant advocated for the holding of the 1967 referendum, which led to giving Aboriginal people more say in their affairs, including eventually leading to the creation of ATSIC (Aboriginal and Torres Strait Islander Commission) in 1990.

After leaving politics, he continued to be committed to Aboriginal issues, campaigning actively in the mid-1980s.

== Personal life and death ==
Bryant married Patricia Jean Hilton (née Grant), an accountant, on 5 December 1942 at St Margaret's Church in Eltham. They had two sons.

He died on 14 January 1991, eleven months prior to Hawke's ousting as Prime Minister.

Bryant's son Robin donated the family's Bark Petition to the National Museum of Australia in 2009.

Political offices
Preceded by Peter Howson	Minister for Aboriginal Affairs; 1972–1973	Succeeded by Jim Cavanagh
Preceded by Kep Enderby	Minister for the Capital Territory; 1973–1975	Succeeded by Reg Withers
Parliament of Australia
Preceded by Bill Bryson	Member for Wills; 1955–1980	Succeeded by Bob Hawke
