= Victorian Aboriginal Child and Community Agency =

Organisation providing services for Aboriginal Australians

The Victorian Aboriginal Child and Community Agency (VACCA), formerly known as the Victorian Aboriginal Child Care Agency, and the Aboriginal Child Care Agency (ACCA), is an Aboriginal Community Controlled Organisation (ACCO) in Victoria, founded by Mollie Dyer in 1977 to provide services to and advocacy for Aboriginal Australians and Torres Strait Islanders. VACCA played an important role in bringing to light the effects of the Stolen Generations on families.

== History ==
The Victorian Aboriginal Child and Community Agency (VACCA) was established in 1977 by Auntie Mollie Dyer after discussions at a national adoption conference held that year. In particular, Mollie Dyer's contribution to the conference and increasing pressure from the Victorian Aboriginal Legal Service, which saw the link between child removal from Indigenous families (later known as the Stolen Generations) and over-representation in the criminal justice system.

VACCA became a model for other Indigenous child care agencies nationwide, and it networked with activists in other states to ensure the success of the other agencies.

Out of the state-based agencies, and as a result of the First Aboriginal Child Survival Seminar held in Melbourne in 1979, the Secretariat of National Aboriginal and Islander Child Care (SNAICC) was established in 1981 as a national non-government body representing the interests of Aboriginal and Torres Strait Islander children and families.
