= 1967 Australian referendum (Aboriginals) =

1967 constitutional referendum on the legal status of Indigenous Australians

1967 Australian Aboriginals Referendum
- 27 May 1967
- Question 2 Do you approve the proposed law for the alteration of the Constitution entitled— "An Act to alter the Constitution so as to omit certain words relating to the People of the Aboriginal Race in any State and so that Aboriginals are to be counted in reckoning the Population"?
- Outcome: Amendment Passed

Results
Choice	Votes	%
Yes	5,183,113	90.77%
No	527,007	9.23%
Valid votes	5,710,120	98.42%
Invalid or blank votes	91,464	1.58%
Total votes	5,801,584	100.00%
Registered voters/turnout	6,182,585	93.84%
- Results by county

The second question of the 1967 Australian referendum of 27 May 1967, called by the Holt government, related to Indigenous Australians. Voters were asked whether to give the Commonwealth Parliament the power to make special laws for Indigenous Australians, and whether Indigenous Australians should be included in official population counts for constitutional purposes. The term "the Aboriginal Race" was used in the question. (Note: "Aboriginal race" was used in the wording of section 51 (xxvi), relevant to the power to make laws, however the term was not defined in the Constitution. The ballot paper did not clarify the term and also used the term "Aboriginal people". Justice Deane in the High Court in the 1983 case of Commonwealth v. Tasmania interpreted "Aboriginal race" in section 51 (xxvi) "..to refer to all Australian Aboriginals collectively... By 'Australian Aboriginal' I mean, in accordance with what I understand to be the conventional meaning of that term, a person of Aboriginal descent, albeit mixed, who identifies himself as such and who is recognized by the Aboriginal community as an Aboriginal.")

Technically the referendum question was a vote on the Constitution Alteration (Aboriginals) 1967 that would amend section 51(xxvi) and repeal section 127.

The amendments to the Constitution were overwhelmingly endorsed, winning 90.77% of votes cast and having majority support in all six states. The amendment became law on 10 August 1967.

== Background ==
In 1901, the attorney-general, Alfred Deakin, provided a legal opinion on the meaning of section 127 of the Constitution of Australia. Section 127 excluded "aboriginal natives" from being counted when reckoning the numbers of the people of the commonwealth or a state. His legal advice was that "half-castes" were not "aboriginal natives".

Prior to 1967, censuses asked a question about Aboriginal race to establish numbers of "half-castes" and "full-bloods". (Note: In censuses prior to 1947, Torres Strait Islanders were regarded as aboriginal. In the 1947 Census, Torres Strait Islanders were considered to be Polynesian and in 1954 and 1961 censuses were considered to be Pacific Islanders. In the 1966 census, Torres Strait Islanders were regarded as aboriginal.) "Full-bloods" were then subtracted from the official population figure in accordance with the legal advice from the attorney-general.

Strong activism by individuals and both Indigenous and non-Indigenous groups greatly aided the success of the 1967 referendum in the years leading up to the vote. Calls for Aboriginal issues to be dealt with at the federal level began as early as 1910. Minimal changes were instigated for Aboriginal rights until the 1960s, where the Yirrkala bark petitions in 1963 and the ensuing Milirrpum v Nabalco Pty Ltd and Commonwealth of Australia (Gove Land Rights Case), and Gurindji Strike highlighted the negative treatment of Indigenous workers in the Northern Territory. From here, the overall plight of Aboriginal Australians became a fundamental political issue.

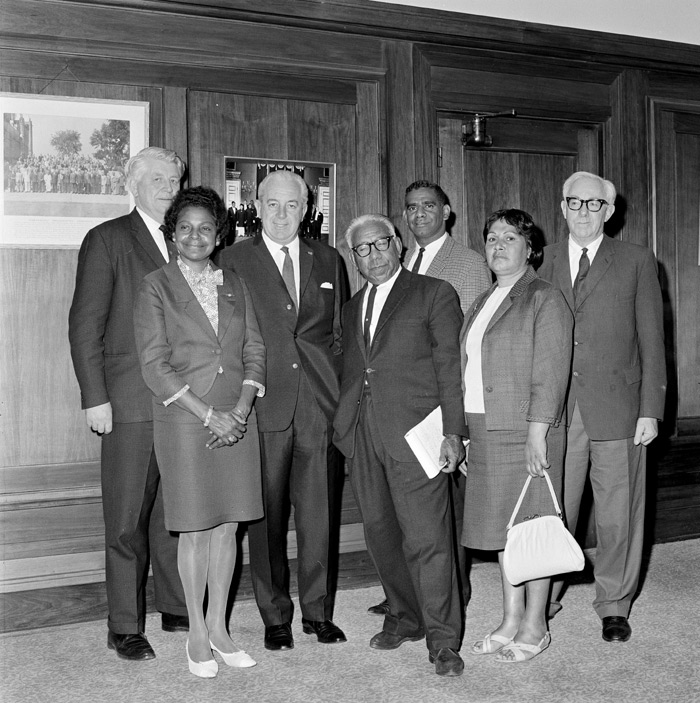
Gordon Bryant (left), prime minister Harold Holt (third from left) and Bill Wentworth (right) meeting with FCAATSI representatives (l–r) Faith Bandler, Douglas Nicholls, Burnum Burnum, and Winnie Branson

On 7 April 1965, the Menzies Cabinet decided that it would seek to repeal section 127 of the Constitution at the same time as it sought to amend the nexus provision, but made no firm plans or timetable for such action. In August 1965, attorney-general Billy Snedden proposed to Cabinet that abolition of section 127 was inappropriate unless section 51(xxvi) was simultaneously amended to remove the words "other than the aboriginal race in any state". He was rebuffed, but gained agreement when he made a similar submission to the Holt Cabinet in 1966. In the meantime, his Liberal colleague Billy Wentworth had introduced a private member's bill proposing inter alia to amend section 51(xxvi).

In 1964, the Leader of the Opposition, Arthur Calwell, had proposed such a change and pledged that his party, the Australian Labor Party, would back any referendum to that effect.

Winnie Branson, who became the first South Australian state secretary of Federal Council for the Advancement of Aborigines and Torres Strait Islanders (FCAATSI) in 1967, along with other FCAATSI members Faith Bandler, Douglas Nicholls, and Burnum Burnum, met with Prime Minister Harold Holt and MPs Gordon Bryant and William Wentworth in Canberra in February 1967 to advocate for the cause.

In 1967, the Australian Parliament was unanimous in voting for the alteration bill.

The Australian Board of Missions, the Australasian Association for the Advancement of Science, the Australian Aborigines League, the Australian Council of Churches, (FCAATSI), the Methodist Commission on Aboriginal Affairs, and spokespeople such as Ruby Hammond, Bill Onus, Faith Bandler, and Joe McGinness were some of the many groups and individuals who effectively utilised the media and their influential platforms to generate the momentum needed to achieve a landslide Yes vote.

== Question ==
DO YOU APPROVE the proposed law for the alteration of the Constitution entitled— "An Act to alter the Constitution so as to omit certain words relating to the People of the Aboriginal Race in any State and so that Aboriginals are to be counted in reckoning the Population"?

== Amendments to the Constitution ==
Voters were asked to approve, together, changes to two provisions in the Constitution section 51(xxvi) and section 127.

Section 51 begins:

The Parliament shall, subject to this Constitution, have power to make laws for the peace, order, and good government of the Commonwealth with respect to:

And the extraordinary clauses that follow (ordinarily referred to as heads of power) list most of the legislative powers of the federal parliament. The amendment deleted the text in bold from subsection xxvi (known as the "race" or "races" power):

The people of any race, other than the aboriginal race in any State, for whom it is deemed necessary to make special laws;

The amendment gave the Commonwealth parliament power to make "special laws" with respect to Aboriginal People living in a state; the parliament already had unfettered power in regard to territories under section 122 of the Constitution.

Section 127 was wholly removed. Headed "Aborigines not to be counted in reckoning population", it had read:

In reckoning the numbers of the people of the Commonwealth, or of a State or other part of the Commonwealth, aboriginal natives shall not be counted.

The Constitution required the calculation of "the people" for several purposes in sections 24, 89, 93 and 105. Section 89 related to the imposition of uniform customs duties and operated until 1901. Section 93 related to uniform custom duties after being imposed by section 89 and operated until 1908. Section 105 related to taking over state debts and was superseded by section 105A inserted in the Constitution in 1929 following the 1928 referendum. Accordingly, in 1967, only section 24 in relation to the House of Representatives had any operational importance to section 127.

Section 24 "requires the membership of the House of Representatives to be distributed among the States in proportion to the respective numbers of their people". The number of people in section 24 is calculated using the latest statistics of the Commonwealth which are derived from the census. Section 51(xi) of the Constitution enabled the Parliament to make laws for "census and statistics" and it exercised that power to pass the Census and Statistics Act 1905.

== Results ==
Result (Note: Handbook of the 44th Parliament (2014) "Part 5 - Referendums and Plebiscites - Referendum results". Parliamentary Library of Australia.)
State	Electoral roll	Ballots issued	For		Against		Informal
State	Electoral roll	Ballots issued	Vote	%	Vote	%	Informal
New South Wales	2,315,828	2,166,507	1,949,036	91.46	182,010	8.54	35,461
Victoria	1,734,476	1,630,594	1,525,026	94.68	85,611	5.32	19,957
Queensland	904,808	848,728	748,612	89.21	90,587	10.79	9,529
South Australia	590,275	560,844	473,440	86.26	75,383	13.74	12,021
Western Australia	437,609	405,666	319,823	80.95	75,282	19.05	10,561
Tasmania	199,589	189,245	167,176	90.21	18,134	9.79	3,935
Total for Commonwealth	6,182,585	5,801,584	5,183,113	90.77	527,007	9.23	91,464
Results	Obtained majority in all six states and an overall majority of 4,656,106 votes. Carried						

At this time, territorians, while able and required to vote in elections, were not permitted to vote in referendums. That was not established until 1977.

== What the referendum did not do ==
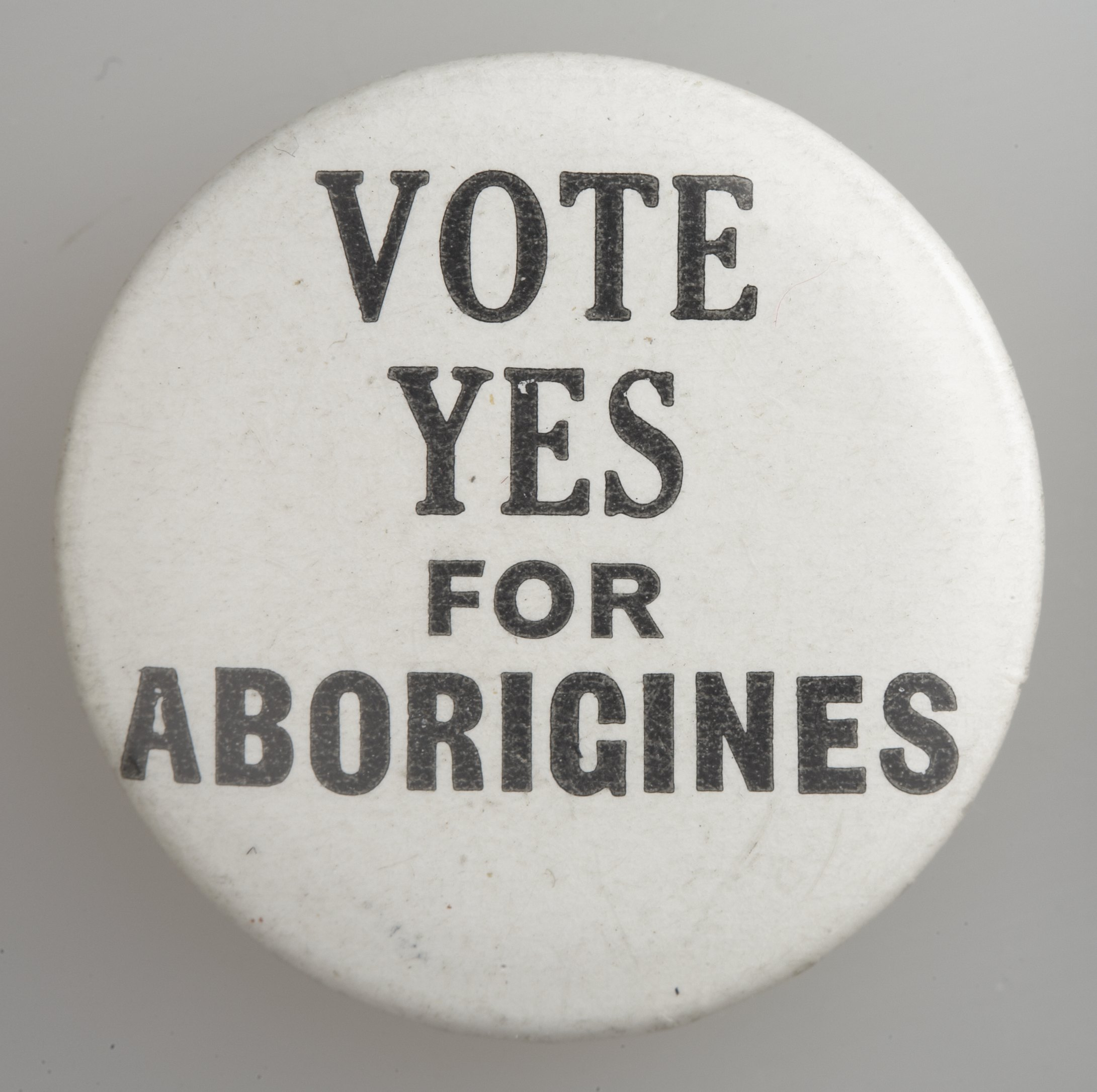
A badge supporting the "Yes" vote, created around the time of the referendum.

=== Give voting rights ===
It is frequently stated that the 1967 referendum gave Aboriginal people Australian citizenship and that it gave them the right to vote in federal elections; however, this was not the case.

From 1944, Aboriginal people in Western Australia could apply to become citizens of the state, which gave them various rights, including the right to vote. This citizenship was conditional on adopting "the manner and habits of civilised life" and not associating with Aboriginal people other than their parents, siblings, children, (Note: referred to in section 4(2) of the Natives (Citizenship Rights) Act 1944 as first-degree relatives.) or grandchildren, (Note: referred to in section 4(2) of the Natives (Citizenship Rights) Act 1944 as lineal descendants.) and could be taken away at any time. This situation continued until 1971. Most Indigenous Australians continued to be denied the right to vote in elections for the Australian Parliament even after 1949. The Commonwealth Electoral Act 1949 gave Aboriginal people the right to vote in federal elections only if they were able to vote in their state elections (they were disqualified from voting altogether in Queensland, while in Western Australia and in the Northern Territory the right was conditional), or if they had served in the defence force.

The Commonwealth Electoral Act 1962 gave all Aboriginal people the option of enrolling to vote in federal elections. It was not until the Commonwealth Electoral Amendment Act 1983 that voting became compulsory for Aboriginal people, as it was for other Australians.

Aboriginal people (and all other people) living in the Northern Territory were not allowed to vote in the referendum, which remained the case for both the Northern Territory and the Australian Capital Territory until the Constitutional amendment to section 128 after a referendum in 1977.

=== Supersede a "Flora and Fauna Act" ===
It is also sometimes mistakenly stated that the 1967 referendum overturned a Flora and Fauna Act. This is believed to have come from the New South Wales National Parks and Wildlife Act 1974, which controlled Aboriginal heritage, land and culture. The other states had equivalent acts which were managed by various departments, including those relating to agriculture and fishing.

=== Right to be included in the census ===
Section 127 prevented the inclusion of the Indigenous Australians in the official population for constitutional purposes, i.e. their population would not be included in the calculation of the number of seats to assign for each state or in the determination of tax revenue. The section did not prevent the Bureau of Statistics from counting or collecting other information about Indigenous Australians. From 1911 to 1966 the Bureau had collected information about Indigenous Australians, however this was published separately to the general population. Inclusion in the general population was thus important symbolically, but the change did not directly improve the information available to government.

== Legacy ==
Ninety percent of voters voted yes, and the overwhelming support gave the Federal Government a clear mandate to implement policies to benefit Aboriginal people. Many misconceptions have arisen as to the outcomes of the referendum, some as a result of it taking on a symbolic meaning during a period of increasing Aboriginal self-confidence. It was some five years before any real change occurred as a result of the referendum, but federal legislation has since been enacted covering land rights, discriminatory practices, financial assistance, and preservation of cultural heritage.

The referendum result had two main outcomes:

- The first was to alter the legal boundaries within which the Federal Government could act. The Federal Parliament was given a constitutional head-of-power under which it could make special laws "for" Aboriginal people (for their benefit or, as the High Court has made clear, their detriment) in addition to other "races". The Australian Constitution states that federal law prevails over state law, where they are inconsistent, so that the Federal Parliament could, if it so chose, enact legislation that would end discrimination against Aboriginal people by state governments. However, during the first five years following the referendum the Federal Government did not use this new power.
- The other key outcome of the referendum was to provide Aboriginal people with a symbol of their political and moral rights. The referendum occurred at a time when Aboriginal activism was accelerating, and it was used as a kind of historical shorthand for all the relevant political events of the time, such as the demands for land rights by the Gurindji people, the equal-pay case for pastoral workers, and the Freedom Rides to end segregation in New South Wales. This use as a symbol for a period of activism and change has contributed to the misconceptions about the effects of the constitutional changes themselves.

=== Motivation behind special laws ===
It was the intention of the government and many voters that this new power was to be only used beneficially. However, in the 1998 case of Kartinyeri v Commonwealth, the High Court did not find that such a restriction on the power existed, with the court being split 2:2 (2 judges not deciding) as to whether or not the power could be used to the detriment of an identified race. The Hindmarsh Island bridge controversy and the Northern Territory Intervention are two circumstances where the post-1967 race power has arguably been used in this way.

=== Symbolic effect ===
The 1967 referendum has acquired a symbolic meaning in relation to a period of rapid social change during the 1960s. As a result, it has been credited with initiating political and social change that was the result of other factors. The real legislative and political impact of the 1967 referendum has been to enable, and thereby compel, the federal government to take action in the area of Aboriginal Affairs. Federal governments with a broader national and international agenda have attempted to end the discriminatory practices of state governments such as Queensland and to introduce policies that encourage self-determination and financial security for Aboriginal people. However, the effectiveness of these policies has been tempered by an unwillingness of most federal governments to deal with the difficult issues involved in tackling recalcitrant state governments. It has been argued that Holt, who died not long after the referendum, was setting up a more extensive government response than Gorton enacted.

=== Land rights ===
The benefits of the referendum began to flow to Aboriginal people in 1972. On 26 January 1972, Aboriginal peoples erected the Aboriginal Tent Embassy on the lawns of the Federal Parliament building in Canberra to express their frustration at the lack of progress on land rights and racial discrimination issues. This became a major confrontation that raised Aboriginal affairs high on the political agenda in the federal election later that year. One week after gaining office, the Whitlam government (1972–1975) established a Royal Commission into land rights for Aboriginal people in the Northern Territory under Justice Woodward. Its principal recommendations, delivered in May 1974, were: that Aboriginal people should have inalienable title to reserve lands; that regional land councils should be established; to establish a fund to purchase land with which Aboriginal people had a traditional connection, or that would provide economic or other benefits; prospecting and mineral exploration on Aboriginal land should only occur with their consent (or that of the Federal Government if the national interest required it); entry onto Aboriginal land should require a permit issued by the regional land council. The recommendations were framed in terms to enable application outside the Northern Territory. The Federal Government agreed to implement the principal recommendations, and in 1975, the House of Representatives passed the Aboriginal Councils and Associations Bill and the Aboriginal Land (Northern Territory) Bill, but the Senate had not considered them by the time parliament was dissolved in 1975.

The following year, the Fraser government (1975–1983) amended the Aboriginal Land (Northern Territory) Bill by introducing the Aboriginal Land Rights (Northern Territory) Bill. The new bill made a number of significant changes such as limitation on the operations and boundaries of land councils; giving Northern Territory law effect on Aboriginal land, thereby enabling land rights to be eroded; removing the power of land councils to issue permits to non-Aboriginal people; and allowing public roads to be built on Aboriginal land without consent. This bill was passed as the Aboriginal Land Rights Act 1976. It is significant however that this legislation was implemented at all, given the political allegiances of the Fraser government, and shows the level of community support for social justice for Aboriginal people at the time.

=== Use of "race power" in legislation ===
The Whitlam government used its constitutional powers to overrule racially discriminatory state legislation. On reserves in Queensland, Aboriginal people were forbidden to gamble, use foul language, undertake traditional cultural practices, indulge in adultery, or drink alcohol. They were also required to work without payment. In the Aboriginal Courts in Queensland the same official acted as judge as well as the prosecuting counsel. Defendants almost invariably pleaded guilty as pleas of not guilty were more than likely to lead to a longer sentence. The Whitlam government, using the race power, enacted the Aboriginal and Torres Strait Islanders (Queensland Discriminatory Laws) Act 1975 to override the state laws and eliminate racial discrimination against Aboriginal people. However, no federal government ever enforced this Act.

The race power was also used by the Whitlam government to introduce affirmative action in favour of Aboriginal people. It established schemes whereby Aboriginal people could obtain housing, loans, emergency accommodation and tertiary education allowances. It also increased funding for the Aboriginal Legal Service enabling twenty-five offices to be established throughout Australia.

The race power gained in the 1967 referendum has been used in several other pieces of significant Federal legislation. One of the pieces of legislation enacted to protect the Gordon River catchment used the race power but applied it to all people in Australia. The law prohibited anyone from damaging sites, relics and artefacts of Aboriginal settlement in the Gordon River catchment. In the Tasmanian Dam Case, the High Court held that even though this law applied to all people and not only to Aboriginal people, it still constituted a special law.

In the 1992 Mabo judgment, the High Court of Australia established the existence of Native Title in Australian Common Law. Using the race power, the Keating Government enacted the Native Title Act 1993 and successfully defended a High Court challenge from the Queensland Government.

=== Blame shifting ===
In granting the Commonwealth a broad power to legislate in regards to Indigenous Australians, responsibilities for areas traditionally the purview of the states (such as housing, education and healthcare) was shared between both branches of government. As a result, both levels have sought to blame the other for the continuing disadvantage of Indigenous Australians, while seeking to place the cost and responsibility to manage these issues on the other. Additionally, the disillusion in the face of continuing discrimination despite the overwhelming success of the vote led to a new generation of Indigenous activists, who placed a greater emphasis on their rights as First Peoples as seen through the establishment of the Aboriginal Tent Embassy, the focus on sovereignty and land rights.

=== Negative application of "race power" ===
When John Howard's Coalition government came to power in 1996, it intervened in the Hindmarsh Island bridge controversy in South Australia with legislation that introduced an exception to the Aboriginal and Torres Strait Islander Heritage Protection Act 1984, to allow the bridge to proceed. The Ngarrindjeri challenged the new legislation in the High Court on the basis that it was discriminatory to declare that the Heritage Protection Act applied to sites everywhere but Hindmarsh Island, and that such discrimination – essentially on the basis of race – had been disallowed since the Commonwealth was granted the power to make laws with respect to the "Aboriginal race" as a result of the 1967 Referendum. The High Court decided, by a majority, that the amended s.51(xxvi) of the Constitution still allowed the Commonwealth parliament to make laws either for the benefit or to the detriment of a particular race. This decision effectively meant that those people who had believed that they were casting a vote against negative discrimination towards Indigenous people in 1967 had, in fact, allowed the Commonwealth to participate in the discrimination against Indigenous people which had been practised by the States.

== See also ==
- 2023 Australian Indigenous Voice referendum
- Council for Aboriginal Rights
- History of Australia
- Politics of Australia
- Referendums in Australia
- Voting rights of Aboriginal and Torres Strait Islander peoples
- Flora and Fauna Act myth

== Sources ==
- Arcioni, Elisa (2012). "Excluding Indigenous Australians from 'The People': A Reconsideration of Sections 25 and 127 of the Constitution". Federal Law Review. 40 (3). Canberra: Australian National University: 287–315. doi:10.22145/flr.40.3.1. ISSN 1444-6928. S2CID 210774854.
- Broome, Richard (1982). Aboriginal Australians. St Leonards: Allen & Unwin.
- Lewis, Wendy; Balderstone, Simon; Bowan, John (2006). Events That Shaped Australia. New Holland. ISBN 9781741104929.
- Lippmann, Lorna (1994). Generations of Resistance: Mabo and justice. Melbourne: Longman Australia Pty Ltd.
- Pilger, John (1990). A Secret Country. London: Vintage.
- Ross, Kate (1999). Population Issues, Indigenous Australians, 1996 (PDF). Canberra: Australian Bureau of Statistics. ISBN 0642256845. 4708.0 - Occasional Paper.
- Sawer, Geoffrey (1966). "The Australian Constitution and the Australian Aborigines" (PDF). Federal Law Review. 2 (1). Canberra: Australian National University: 17–36. doi:10.1177/0067205X6600200102. ISSN 1444-6928. S2CID 159414135.
- Van Krieken, Robert (2000). "From Milirrpum to Mabo: The High Court, Terra Nullius and Moral Entrepreneurship". University of New South Wales Law Journal. 23 (1).
- Whitlam, Gough (1985). The Whitlam Government 1972–1975. Ringwood, Victoria: Viking.
- Williams, George; Brennan, Sean; Lynch, Andrew (2014). Blackshield and Williams Australian constitutional law and theory : commentary and materials (6th ed.). Annendale, NSW: Federation Press. ISBN 9781862879188.

Amendments to the Constitution of Australia
4th amendment Social Services Amendment (1946)	Aboriginals amendment 1967	Followed by Senate Vacancies Amendment; Referendum amendment Retirement of Judges amendment (1977)
