= Aborigines Advancement League =

Aboriginal rights organisation in Australia

- Nickname: AAL
- Predecessor: Australian Aborigines' League & Save the Aborigines Committee
- Formation: 1957
- Founded at: Melbourne
- Purpose: Indigenous rights campaigning
- Location: Melbourne
- Region served: Victoria, Australia
- Website: aal.org.au
- Formerly called: Victorian Aborigines Advancement League; Aboriginal Advancement League

The Aborigines Advancement League is the oldest Aboriginal rights organisation in Australia still in operation. It was founded in 1957 as the Victorian Aborigines Advancement League (VAAL). Its precursor organisations were the Australian Aborigines League and Save the Aborigines Committee, and it was also formerly known as Aborigines Advancement League (Victoria), and for some time in the early 2020s as Aboriginal Advancement League.

The organisation is primarily concerned with Aboriginal welfare issues and the preservation of Aboriginal culture and heritage, and is based in Melbourne. Its journal is called Smoke Signals.

== History ==
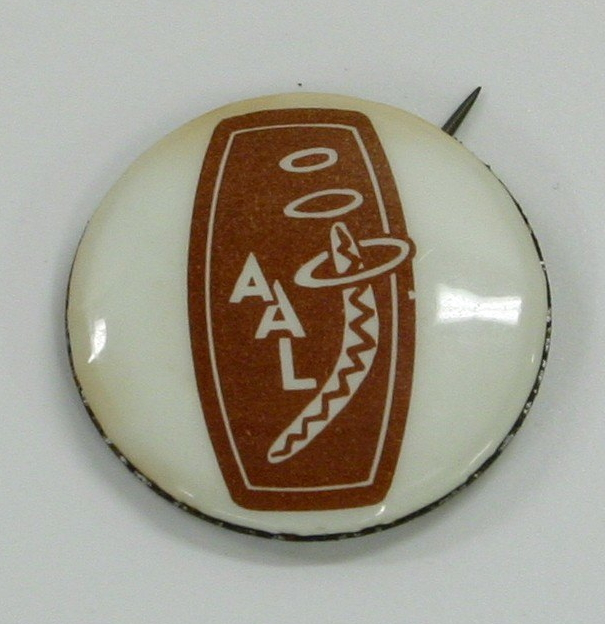
A pre-1986 badge of the AAL

The Victorian Aborigines Advancement League (VAAL) was established in March 1957, partly in response to an enquiry by retired magistrate, Charles McLean, who had been appointed in 1955 to investigate the circumstances of Aboriginal Victorians. McLean was critical of conditions in the Aboriginal reserves at Lake Tyers and Framlingham. McLean recommended that persons of mixed Aboriginal and European descent be removed from the reserves. The people of Lake Tyers objected to this, and the League was formed out of their campaign.

The new League drew from two already existing organisations, the Australian Aborigines League, established in 1934, and the Save the Aborigines Committee, established as a response to the Warburton Ranges controversy in 1956–7. Founding president of the League was Gordon Bryant, with Doris Blackburn as deputy president, Stan Davey as secretary and Douglas Nicholls as Field Officer.

A national umbrella organisation, the Federal Council for Aboriginal Advancement (later FCAATSI) was founded in February 1958 in Adelaide, South Australia, but the Aborigines Advancement League of South Australia (AALSA) finally disaffiliated in 1966, because it thought the federal organisation was too centred on Victoria. (Davey also became secretary of FCAATSI, before moving to Western Australia.)

Early activities included lobbying for a referendum to change the Australian constitution to allow the Federal government to legislate on Aboriginal affairs, and an establishing a legal defence fund for Albert Namatjira, after he was charged with supplying liquor to an Aboriginal ward. By 1967 it had moved to being fully controlled by Aboriginal people, with Bill Onus as the first Aboriginal president.

In 1968, the AAL, led by Bruce McGuinness and Bob Maza, invited Caribbean activist Roosevelt Brown to give a talk on Black Power in Melbourne, causing a media frenzy. The AAL was influenced by the ideas of Malcolm X and Stokely Carmichael. The Australian Black Power movement had emerged in Redfern in Sydney, Fitzroy, Melbourne, and South Brisbane, following the "Freedom Ride" led by Charles Perkins in 1965, but this visit brought the term to wider attention.

Salaried director Elizabeth Maud Hoffman, who served from 1975 to 1983, was the organisation's longest-serving director.

The organisation changed its name from 2020 until January 2025 to Aboriginal Advancement League.

== Headquarters ==
In 1999, the Victorian government completed a A$2.79-million (equivalent to A$5.19 million in 2022) renovation of the league's headquarters in Watt Street, Thornbury. As well as providing a community facility, the building houses a museum and "keeping place" for items of historical, cultural and spiritual importance to Aboriginal people.

== Publications ==
Smoke Signals was the official magazine of the AAL. Published since 1957, copies were unnumbered until April 1960, when volume 1, issue 1 was published. Three issues per year were published until August 1963, after which it was published quarterly.

The first editor was Stan Davey, with Gordon Bryant following Davey as editor when he left to work for FCAATSI. The newspaper was especially focused on educating non-Indigenous Australians about the activities of the VAAL, as well as the social and economic conditions in which Aboriginal Victorians lived. While some sources report that Smoke Signals ceased publication in 1972, library catalogues and Museums Victoria show that it went on being published occasionally until at least 2011 and possibly longer. As of 2022 there is no mention of the journal on the website.

== Current activities ==
The league provides a number of services to Koorie people, including family support, food assistance, home visits, advocacy, counselling and educational programs, drug and alcohol awareness and funeral services. It also has a cultural unit that provides information and speakers for schools.
