= Grace Bardsley =

Australian Indigenous rights activist (1920–1972)

Grace Bardsley (1920–1972) was an Australian Aboriginal rights activist and political activist. She was a founding member of Aboriginal-Australian Fellowship (AAF) and a member of the Aborigines Advancement League (AAL). She authored a book Aborigines and the Law covering assimilation problems mainly in the Sydney area. The Grace Bardsley Aboriginal Fund was established in her name by the AAF to help fund publications and other Aboriginal rights supporting projects.

== Life and activism ==
Bardsley was born in 1920. She worked as a professional typist and secretary for the North Australia Workers' Union (NAWU) in the Northern Territory. In 1941 she became a member of the Communist Party of Australia, but became alienated in the 1950s when she denounced Stalinism. After leaving the communist party and moving to Sydney. Bardsley continued to be active on a range of organisations committed to social justice and peace.

In 1943 Bardsley met Pearl Gibbs, an Aboriginal activist who was a member of the Aborigines Progressive Association (APA) campaigned for Aboriginal citizenship rights. Gibbs introduced Barsley to the social and racial context of Aboriginal oppression and poverty, and when Gibbs called for volunteer typists for APA, Barsley gladly agreed. In the 1950s, while volunteering for organisations devoted to peace and social justice, Bardsley continued working full-time as a private secretary to the managing director of a Sydney timber company.

In 1956 Bardsley along with Pearl Gibbs, Bert Groves and Faith Bandler formed the Aboriginal Australian Fellowship, which was registered as a charity in 1957. According to the Sydney Morning Herald the goal of the Fellowship was to promote better understanding between aborigines and European Australians.

In late 1959 Bardsley travelled with Len and Mona Fox to the northern coast of New South Wales to visit far reserves and meet Aboriginal people from the missions and reserves. They encouraged Aborigines to sign a petition to repeal the anti-liquor clause that interfered Aboriginal people to mix freely with others.

In late 1950s, Bardsley also started to work with Helen Palmer and Audrey Johnson on editing and producing fortnightly socialist newspaper Outlook that was published until 1970.

Bardsley was known for her practical support to individual Aborigines, namely she supported Aboriginal woman Joyce Clague to finish her education and find her first job. Bardsley also encouraged Clague to become skilled at activism within committees.

In July 1965 at the AAF general meeting dedicated to organisation of the first all-Aboriginal AAF conference Bardsley pointed at an error of the organisers who first planned to include both Aboriginal and European Australian speakers to the program of the conference. She explained that ‘the whole point of this conference is that Aborigines should not hear whites tell them what to do. The Aborigines should be there sponsoring, chairing and speaking. They should have the whole show.’ Bardsley was selected by aboriginal members to coordinate the office work of the Aboriginal sponsoring committee and sent letters to Aboriginal communities throughout the state.

In 1965 Bardsley published a book called Aborigines and the law covering assimilation problems mainly in Sydney area.

Grace Bardsley died in 1972. The Grace Bardsley Aboriginal Fund, established by the AAF in her name, helped to fund publications and other Aboriginal rights supporting projects between 1973 and 1978.
