= Foundation for Aboriginal Affairs =

Australian Aboriginal community organisation

The Foundation for Aboriginal Affairs (FAA), formerly Aboriginal Affairs Association, and nicknamed "the Foundo", was a community organisation for Aboriginal people in Sydney, New South Wales, Australia between 1964 and 1977. It published an occasional newsletter called Irabina, and in 1972 published four issues of Black Australian News.

== History ==
=== Origins and early days ===
The Foundation for Aboriginal Affairs grew out of the Aboriginal-Australian Fellowship, whose membership comprised both Aboriginal and non-Aboriginal people, including Pearl Gibbs, Joyce Clague, and Faith Bandler. It was established at a time when many Aboriginal people, or Kooris, were moving from the country to the city. At the time, the only completely Aboriginal organisation at the time was the Aborigines Progressive Association, also based in Sydney.

The organisation's establishment was planned from 1963, founded by Aboriginal men Bill Geddes and Ted Noffs (a Methodist and Uniting Church minister and social activist of German descent), working with activists Ken Brindle and Charles Perkins. A non-Aboriginal woman, Myrtle Cox, was also involved in its establishment. Noffs became chairman and Perkins and Brindle vice-chairman of the organisation. Wiradjuri nurse Isobelle Mary Ferguson, daughter of William (Bill) Ferguson (co-founder of the Aborigines Progressive Association in 1937) was honorary secretary in 1963–4.

The original name of the organisation was Aboriginal Affairs Association; the name was changed to Foundation for Aboriginal Affairs at a meeting on 1 July 1964. Its first offices were in the Wayside Chapel, founded by Reverend Noffs in 1964.

A big fund-raising drive in December 1964 raised over A£80,000 for Aboriginal Affairs and the Aboriginal Children's Advancement Society, with the NSW Government giving an additional A£10,000 for the organisation. This allowed them to buy a new building at 810–812 George Street, Sydney in 1965.

It was originally intended to be non-religious and non-political, but later became involved in the push for community control by Aboriginal people. It was nicknamed "the Foundo". Others involved in the running of the Foundo were Chicka Dixon, Harry Williams (who were mostly involved in running the various services offered by the organisation), Gary Foley and Joyce Clague, who became more prominent activists over time. Thelma Bate acted as treasurer at some time during the 1960s.

Perkins, who became manager in 1965 and retained that position until 1969, worked full-time for the organisation after graduating from Sydney University in 1966, working 10-hour days on a low wage, and travelling around the country. He disagreed with several of the white executives, feeling that they could not understand Indigenous issues, and that some of them were motivated by personal gain. This led to disputes in meetings, in which the white executives accused Perkins of being too emotional. Perkins worked with businesses to encourage them to employ Aboriginal people who may not yet have acquired necessary skills.

In August 1966, the foundation requested support from the New South Wales Government, as it was running at a loss after paying wages, rates, taxes, and administration expenses. The vice-president, D. R. Moore, said that Aboriginal people who found themselves in trouble would not go to government-run organisations for welfare, and needed the support of the new foundation.

=== Move to George Street ===
In October 1966 the Foundation for Aboriginal Affairs moved into their building at 810–812 George Street, which was officially opened by Eric Willis, then the Chief Secretary of New South Wales. Musician Jimmy Little was a member and president around 1970. Lynn Thompson acted as secretary for some time, and Connie Nungulla McDonald was an employee.

The foundation, working together with the Aboriginal-Australian Fellowship, gave much support to the campaign for the "Yes" vote in the 1967 referendum to give the federal government power to make laws relating to Aboriginal people. In that year, the foundation had over 400 people using their services. In the last years of the 1960s, the foundation's leadership began to push for Aboriginal control of the organisation.

In 1971, musician and theatre manager Bettie Fisher became a member of the executive committee.

In November 1971, when Pastor David Kirk was chair of the foundation, the deputy premier of New South Wales, Allan Viney, walked out of the foundation's seventh annual meeting as a debate was being held as to whether he should be allowed to stay, given the lack of action for Aboriginal people by the state government. By 1973, the management comprised only Aboriginal people.

In 1973, Brewarrina activist Steve Gordon was appointed as field officer for the Foundation. He worked to improve conditions for Aboriginal people living in West Brewarrina ("Dodge City"), against barriers to employment in the town.

=== Demise ===
In January 1974, the foundation, then chaired by Michael Anderson, signalled to the government that it was running out of funds for that financial year. It had requested A$159,000 in its budget submission, but only received A$62,000 that year. Funding from the wider community dwindled, as often happened with Aboriginal-run organisations, and it shut down its services in 1975.

The organisation closed down in 1977, due partly to lack of funding and also because of a move towards Aboriginal-run organisations.

== Governance, aims and work ==
The patron was the Governor of New South Wales. There was an advisory board, whose members included a judge, doctors, bankers, lawyers, a former deputy police commissioner, a vice chancellor, the Lord Mayor of Sydney, as well as the Cardinal and the Archbishop of Sydney. The foundation included representatives from all political parties, as well as churches and various organisations involved with the welfare of Aboriginal people. Funds were raised by going door-to-door, speaking at public meetings, and social activities, especially dances at the Redfern Town Hall. The dances were a way of practising social inclusion of Aboriginal people.

There were a number of subcommittees focused on areas such as research, social welfare, fund-raising, public relations, entertainment, and the "Thursday Club". Funding came mainly from an annual appeal which was conducted throughout Sydney. Chicka Dixon and Harry Williams were among those involved in running the services, and there were also non-Aboriginal people who helped with fund-raising events and other activities. In September 1964, when Rev. J. Downing was head of the social work committee, the foundation started a recruitment drive for a full-time Aboriginal social worker, the first such position in the country.

The Foundation provided legal, financial and practical help, in matters such as housing, education for employment, and medical assistance. It had a "self-help" approach, and helped to motivate Aboriginal people to take control of their lives, but also to participate in white Australian society. It also supported local Aboriginal musicians such as Malcolm "Mac" Silva (1947-1989) (Note: Silva featured in the 1977 film Country Outcasts, with Harry and Wilga Williams and others.) and his band Black Lace, formerly Silver Linings Jimmy Little, Col Hardy, and Claude "Candy" Williams.

In December 1965, the foundation gave grants to five Aboriginal children to help them to achieve matriculation level at school.

Kathleen Eileen Lester, who was a welfare officer at the foundation, was honoured with an MBE for her services in the 1970 Queen's Birthday Honours.

== Facilities ==
The George St building was improved over time, to include a gymnasium, library, meeting rooms, lounges, and other rooms for sewing, counselling, and adult education. It also provided short-term accommodation and there was a hostel for young people.

The building also housed a cultural centre which sold Aboriginal artefacts and art from the Northern Territory and various communities around the country.

== Publications ==
The FAA's six-page membership brochure, entitled "Some facts concerning the Foundation for Aboriginal Affairs, described the foundation as "A non-political, non-sectarian association of Aboriginal and other Australians, working together on an extensive programme of self-help for the Aboriginal people of N.S.W.".

The FAA produced a newsletter called Irabina (also titled Irabina Monthly Bulletin and Irabina Quarterly for some of its life) from May 1965 to December 1971.

In June 1972, the foundation published the first edition of Black Australian News, a 16-page tabloid newspaper which would, according to Pastor Kirk, "would give a balanced picture of Aboriginal life". Kevin Gilbert was reported in October 1973 to be editor and sole journalist on the paper; however, library records show only four issues, all published in 1972.

== Impact and legacy ==
The Fondo became a hub for Kooris in the city, who participated in its social activities and used its welfare programs. It helped to nurture and produce activism such as the Aboriginal Tent Embassy, which in 1972 alerted the wider public to Indigenous issues.

== Film ==
The 2002 documentary film The Foundation 1963–1977, directed by Troy J. Russell and produced by Chili Films, features Clague, Foley, Dixon, Esther Carroll and Roy Carroll. The Australian Women's Register describes the film as more than a documentary of the organisation, saying that it "unfolds into a complex commentary on indigenous inspired social and political events of the 1960s and 1970s".

A DVD of the film was created by Ronin Films and SBS Television.
