= Len Fox (writer) =

Australian writer, journalist, social activist, artist (1905–2004)

Len Fox AC OBE
- Born: Leonard Phillips Fox; 28 August 1905; Melbourne, Victoria
- Died: 3 January 2004 (aged 98); Sydney, New South Wales
- Known for: Journalism, visual arts, social activism
- Spouse: Mona Brand

Leonard Phillips Fox (28 August 1905 – 3 January 2004) was an Australian writer, journalist, social activist, and painter.

== Background and early years ==
Fox was born in Melbourne. His uncle was the painter Emanuel Phillips Fox, who died when Len Fox was aged 10. In 1984 Fox donated a painting Sunlight Effect painted by his uncle (ca. 1889) to the National Gallery of Australia, in memory of his mother.

Fox studied science at the University of Melbourne, concurrently earning a Diploma of Education. He taught at Scotch College from 1928 to 1932, then spent four years in Europe where he witnessed the rise of Fascism. On returning to Melbourne he joined the Movement Against War and Fascism and the Communist Party of Australia. He was to remain a member until 1970, long after most 'comrades' had quit as a reaction to the Stalinist purges.

== Career ==
His career as a journalist began in 1936 with a pamphlet entitled Spain!.

He moved to Sydney in 1940, and immediately started writing for left-wing weeklies, starting with The Voice of State Labor. He took up painting, producing an array of left-wing propagandist posters, and covers for his many booklets, such as Australia's Guilty Men, a 32-page diatribe against (inter alia) Prime Minister Robert Menzies for his dealings with Axis countries in the early days of WWII When the State Labor Party collapsed in 1944, he took up with The Tribune where he worked from 1946 to 1955, and in which he first wrote defending refugees and Jews against prejudice

In 1955 he married Mona Brand, a fellow Communist and idealist, who was to become a respected playwright. At the instigation of Wilfred Burchett, they spent 1955–56 in Hanoi, he working as a print journalist, she for Radio Hanoi.

In 1956, Fox was a co-founder of the Indigenous rights organisation the Aboriginal-Australian Fellowship, along with Pearl Gibbs, Charles Leon, Ray Peckham, Bert Groves, Grace Bardsley, Faith Bandler, and Jack Horner.

Fox and Brand's home for the next 50 years was a modest terrace house in Little Surrey Street, near Kings Cross, in an era when the area was not fashionable. They were together when he died, and his coffin was draped with the Eureka Flag, long a subject of his research and of three of his books, authenticating a flag in the Ballarat Art Gallery as the flag that flew over the stockade of the Eureka rebels in 1854.

=== Eureka flag investigation ===
In December 1944, Fox published an article about the as then unconfirmed fragments of the Eureka Flag held by the Art Gallery of Ballarat. He entered into correspondence with the family of Private John King, the art gallery, and Ballarat local historian Nathan Spielvogel. The art gallery gave Fox a sample of the Eureka Flag in March 1945, along with a drawing.

Spielvogel doubted the authenticity of the fragments held by the art gallery. On a visit to Ballarat later that year, Fox visited the art gallery and was given two more pieces by the custodians. In his 1963 self-published booklet, Fox advanced his argument about why the King fragments are authentic. Perhaps due to interest generated by Fox's publication, the main Eureka flag remnants were transferred to a safe at the art gallery later in 1963.

== Legacy ==
Fox's widow Mona initiated the Len Fox Painting Award in his memory. From 2011 and bi-annually the Castlemaine Art Museum invites entrants from amongst living Australian artists who are to represent in painting their reactions to the art and life of Emanuel Phillips Fox whose first biography was written by Len Fox in 1985. One winner is awarded $50,000 and their painting acquired for the collection of the Art Museum. It is amongst the richest painting prizes in Australia. The 2021 winner was First Nations artist Betty Kuntiwa Pumani.

== Selected publications ==
(not included are the many dozens of pamphlets and booklets published for various left-wing organizations)

- The Strange Story of the Eureka Flag self-published 1963
- Depression Down Under (ed.) self-published 1977 ISBN 0-9598104-3-9
- Old Sydney Windmills Self-published 1978 ISBN 0-9598104-5-5
- The Aboriginals pub. Thomas Nelson (Australia) 1978 ISBN 0-17-005155-2
- Marani in Australia with Faith Bandler, pub. Rigby, Adelaide 1980 ISBN 0-7270-1254-1
- Broad Left, Narrow Left self-published 1982 ISBN 0-9598104-9-8
- The Time was Ripe: A History of the Aboriginal-Australian Fellowship, 1956–69 with Faith Bandler Alternative Publishing Cooperative 1983 ISBN 0-909188-78-5
- E Phillips Fox and His Family self-published 1985 ISBN 0-9589239-0-6
- Depression Down Under (ed.) 2nd edition, Hale and Iremonger, 1989 ISBN 0-909497-50-8
- Dream at a Graveside: The History of the Fellowship of Australian Writers 1928 - 1988 (ed. 1989) ISBN 0-909497-50-8
- East Sydney Sketches Self-published 1991 ISBN 0-9589239-4-9
- When I Was Ten: Memories of childhood 1905 - 1985 (ed. with Hilarie Lindsay 1993) Fellowship of Australian Writers ISBN 0-909497-69-9
- Australians on the Left self-published 1996 ISBN 0-9589239-6-5
- Glimpses of a Century self-published 2000 ISBN 1-74018-146-8

== Paintings ==
- On guard at Eureka, 1854 was accepted for exhibition for the 1955 Sulman Prize

== See also ==
- Emanuel Phillips Fox
- Mona Brand
