= New Deal for Aborigines =

Australian federal government policy

The New Deal for Aborigines (or Aboriginal New Deal) was a landmark Australian federal government policy statement on Indigenous Australians. The policy was announced in December 1938 by interior minister John McEwen and detailed in a white paper released in February 1939. It provided for Indigenous people to be granted full civil rights in conjunction with a process of cultural assimilation.

The New Deal was largely drafted by anthropologist A. P. Elkin, without direct input from Indigenous people. Its adoption followed the Day of Mourning protests of 1938 and the Aborigines Progressive Association's lobbying of Prime Minister Joseph Lyons. The policies outlined in the New Deal were not all immediately implemented, but the document provided a framework for later assimilationist policies implemented in the 1950s. The ability of the federal government to implement changes outside of its jurisdiction in the Northern Territory was limited by constitutional constraints, which were not removed until a 1967 referendum.

== Background ==
=== Prior Indigenous policy ===
In the 1930s, government policy towards Indigenous Australians was decentralised, with state governments bearing the primary responsibility for Indigenous affairs. The Australian constitution's "race power" placed limits on the federal government's ability to enact legislation specific to Indigenous Australians. This meant that Indigenous policy at the federal level was almost solely concentrated towards the Northern Territory, the only federal territory with a significant Indigenous population. At the time, the Northern Territory was administered through the Department of the Interior.

In 1937, federal and state authorities held a conference to discuss Indigenous policy. The conference resolved that "the destiny of the natives of Aboriginal origin, but not of the full blood, lies in their ultimate absorption by the people of the Commonwealth". The resolution was viewed unfavourably by Aboriginal leaders, with William Cooper stating that it was based on assumptions of white supremacy and lobbying federal interior minister Thomas Paterson and his successor John McEwen for racial equality.

=== Day of Mourning and deputation ===
On 26 January 1938, the Aborigines Progressive Association (APA) led by William Ferguson and Jack Patten organised the Day of Mourning, a protest coinciding with the 150th anniversary of the arrival of the First Fleet and British colonisation of Australia. Five days later, a deputation of Indigenous activists led by Patten met with McEwen, Prime Minister Joseph Lyons, and his wife Enid, to present a ten-point statement of "national aims", which included the granting of "full citizen status and civil equality with the whites in Australia", full federal control over Indigenous policy, the creation of an advisory board with majority Indigenous representation, and opposition to segregation.

== New Deal ==
=== Development and announcement ===
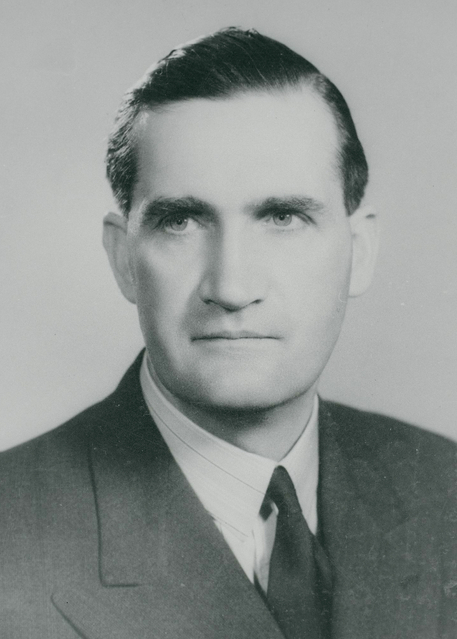
John McEwen

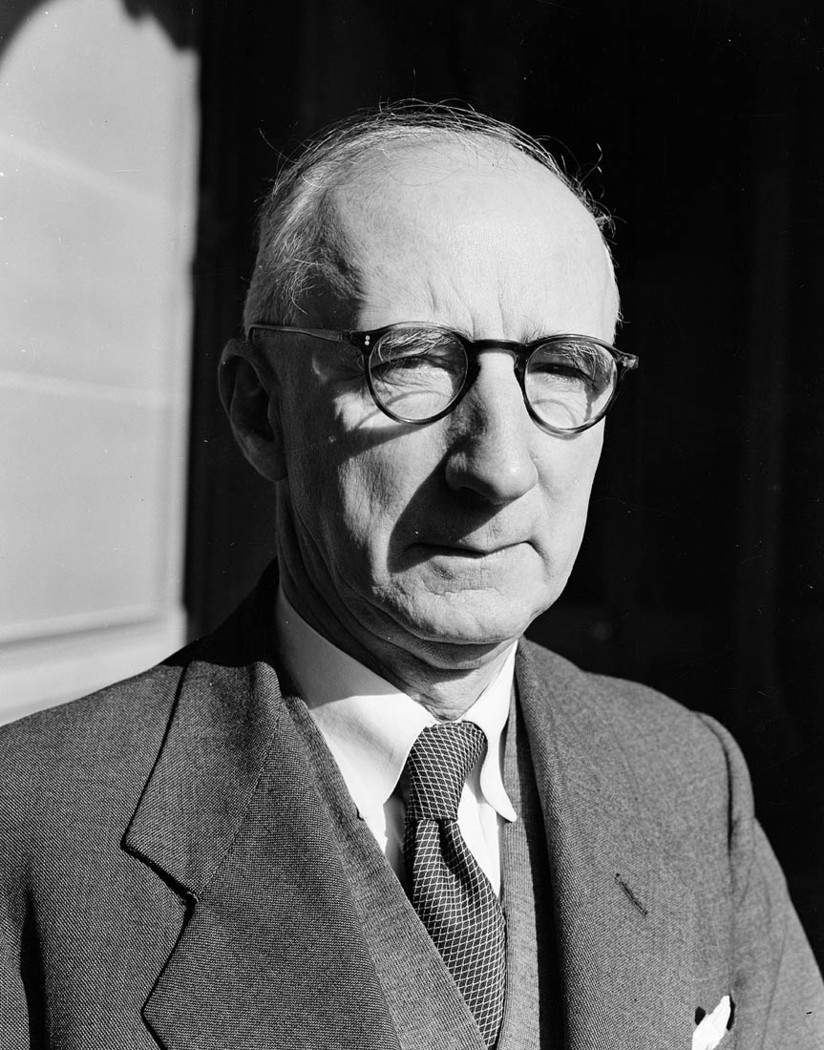
A. P. Elkin

Following his and Lyons' meeting with Patten's delegation, McEwen prepared a cabinet submission authorising him to development an official government policy on Aboriginal affairs. The submission was approved by federal cabinet on 7 February 1938. McEwen subsequently met with his departmental secretary Joseph Carrodus and anthropologist A. P. Elkin to begin drafting a policy. The draft policy was completed in April 1938, largely the work of Elkin.

McEwen undertook an extended tour of the Northern Territory later in 1938, travelling over 5,000 miles (8,000 km) from Mount Isa through to Alice Springs in central Australia and then north to Darwin. According to his biographer, the "long journey through northern Australia gave him a new perspective on the problems of the Aborigines and reinforced his awakening concern for their welfare".

McEwen announced the main aspects of the New Deal in December 1938. He apparently named the policy after the "Indian New Deal" legislated in the United States earlier in the 1930s. The full white paper was released on 8 January 1939 and officially titled The Northern Territory of Australia: Commonwealth Government Policy in Respect to Aboriginals.

=== Aims and provisions ===
McEwen's white paper stated that the "final objective" of the Australian federal government in its policy on Indigenous Australians:

[...] should be the raising of their status so as to entitle them by right and by qualification to the ordinary rights of citizenship and enable them and help them to share with us the opportunities that available in their own native land.

The New Deal envisaged that full rights of citizenship would be obtained by Aboriginal people in a gradual process taking "many generations". It "aimed to convert Aboriginal people from their traditional, nomadic inclinations to a settled life". The white paper saw citizenship rights as the outcome of a process of detribalisation and divided Aboriginal people into four categories – myalls ("aboriginals in their native state"), semi-detribalised, fully detribalised, and half-caste (mixed race).

At an administrative level, McEwen's white paper announced that a Native Affairs branch would be established within the Department of the Interior, based in Darwin. The post of Chief Protector of Aborigines would be abolished. While focused on the Northern Territory, it envisioned a whole-of-government approach whereby state governments would cooperate with the federal government.

The New Deal made provision for all Indigenous workers to receive award wages (standardised pay rates set under industrial law), to which only half-castes had previously been entitled. However, McEwen's policy statement envisioned a hierarchical wage structure would remain in place where "payment would be made in accordance with their capacity to give service, but not under conditions which would permit the use of coloured workers to break down the established conditions of labour in Australia".

=== Implementation ===
The implementation of the New Deal stalled with Lyons' death in April 1939, which saw Robert Menzies become prime minister and McEwen's Country Party leave the governing coalition. McEwen's successor as interior minister was Harry Foll, whose commitment to full citizenship rights for Indigenous people was ambiguous. In May 1939, the new cabinet approved a four-part test developed by Ernest Chinnery. His memo was titled "Qualities which should be possessed by any aboriginal requiring the privileges of a European" and provided that Indigenous applicants for full citizenship rights should be:

1. "capable of exercising the privileges and of fulfilling the obligations of citizenship";
2. "of proved good character, vouched for by a reputable and responsible European";
3. "capable of earning his own living [...] he should not be a permanent dependent inmate of an Aboriginal institution [and] should also be living in the manner of a European"; and
4. "have the capacity for education [and] be reasonably intelligent and able to read and write if possible"

Government focus on Aboriginal policy was lessened by the outbreak of the Pacific War in 1941 and the militarisation of the Northern Territory, with Chinnery among those public servants evacuated from the territory. The failure of the 1944 constitutional referendum – which would have granted the federal government the power to legislate specifically for Indigenous Australians – also contributed to delays in the implementation of New Deal policies. Elkin continued to promote the New Deal policies in his 1944 book Citizenship for the Aborigines: A National Aboriginal Policy, stating that plans for their implementation were "well advanced" in the Northern Territory, despite the interruption of war, and commenting that "a good foundation has been laid for building up a national Aboriginal policy for all Australia". In 1945, Victor White, the secretary of the Native Affairs Branch, reported that the plan remained "in the embryo stage only".

Paul Hasluck, the minister responsible for Indigenous policy through the 1950s and early 1960s, regarded the New Deal statement as representing a "change in outlook", but suggested it was not until the 1950s that it developed into a "clear and practical movement [...] toward a new objective in the administration of Aboriginal affairs".

== Reception and analysis ==
=== Contemporary reaction ===
The New Deal was "enthusiastically received" by the Australian Aborigines' League (AAL) and Aborigines Progressive Association (APA).

In contrast, the new policy was criticised by Cecil Cook, the incumbent Chief Protector of Aborigines, who saw it as a personal attack on his legacy. Anthropologist Donald Thomson, who supported the creation of Aboriginal reserves, felt that the government had misrepresented his views.

Later in 1939, communist leader Tom Wright published New Deal for the Aborigines, a critique of the government's policy.

=== Legacy and analysis ===
The New Deal has been described as a "classic statement of assimilationist thinking". In the Bringing Them Home report on the Stolen Generations, the New Deal is identified as the turning point where the government moved from a policy of "protection and segregation" – where Indigenous people were confined to reserves and had limited legal and civil rights – to an assimilationist policy. According to Anna Haebich, the "full-blown economic and social assimilation" anticipated by the New Deal continued to dominate Indigenous policy until the 1960s.

Ben Silverstein, a scholar of Indigenous history, has argued that the New Deal policies envisaged a form of indirect rule, inspired by British colonial governance systems in Africa and the Pacific. He has noted that the white paper was released only weeks after McEwen released a plans to overhaul land administration and pastoral leases in the Northern Territory, and suggested that the New Deal was designed to complement economic development of the territory, ensuring "continuous availability of black labour to pastoralists".

== Sources ==
- Attwood, Bain (2003). Rights for Aborigines. Allen & Unwin. ISBN 1864489839.
- Golding, Peter S. (1996). Black Jack McEwen: Political Gladiator. Melbourne University Press. ISBN 0522847188.
- Gray, Stephen (2011). Brass Discs, Dog Tags and Finger Scanners: The Apology and Aboriginal Protection in the Northern Territory 1863–1972. Charles Darwin University Press. ISBN 9780980864137.
- Holland, Alison (2005). "Saving the Race: Critics of Absorption Look for an Alternative". In Rowse, Tim (ed.). Contesting Assimilation. API Network. pp. 85–100. ISBN 1920845151.
- Martínez, Julia (2005). "The Limits of Solidarity: The North Australian Workers' Union as Advocates of Assimilation". In Rowse, Tim (ed.). Contesting Assimilation. API Network. pp. 101–118. ISBN 1920845151.
- Murphy, John (2013). "Conditional Inclusion: Aborigines and Welfare Rights in Australia, 1900–47". Australian Historical Studies. 44 (2): 206–226. doi:10.1080/1031461X.2013.791707.
- Silverstein, Ben (2018). Governing Natives: Indirect Rule and Settler Colonialism in Australia's North. Manchester University Press. ISBN 9781526100047.

== See also ==
- Indian Reorganization Act - referred to as the Indian New Deal
