= Ray Peckham =

Aboriginal Australian activist (1929–2025)

Raymond Edward Peckham
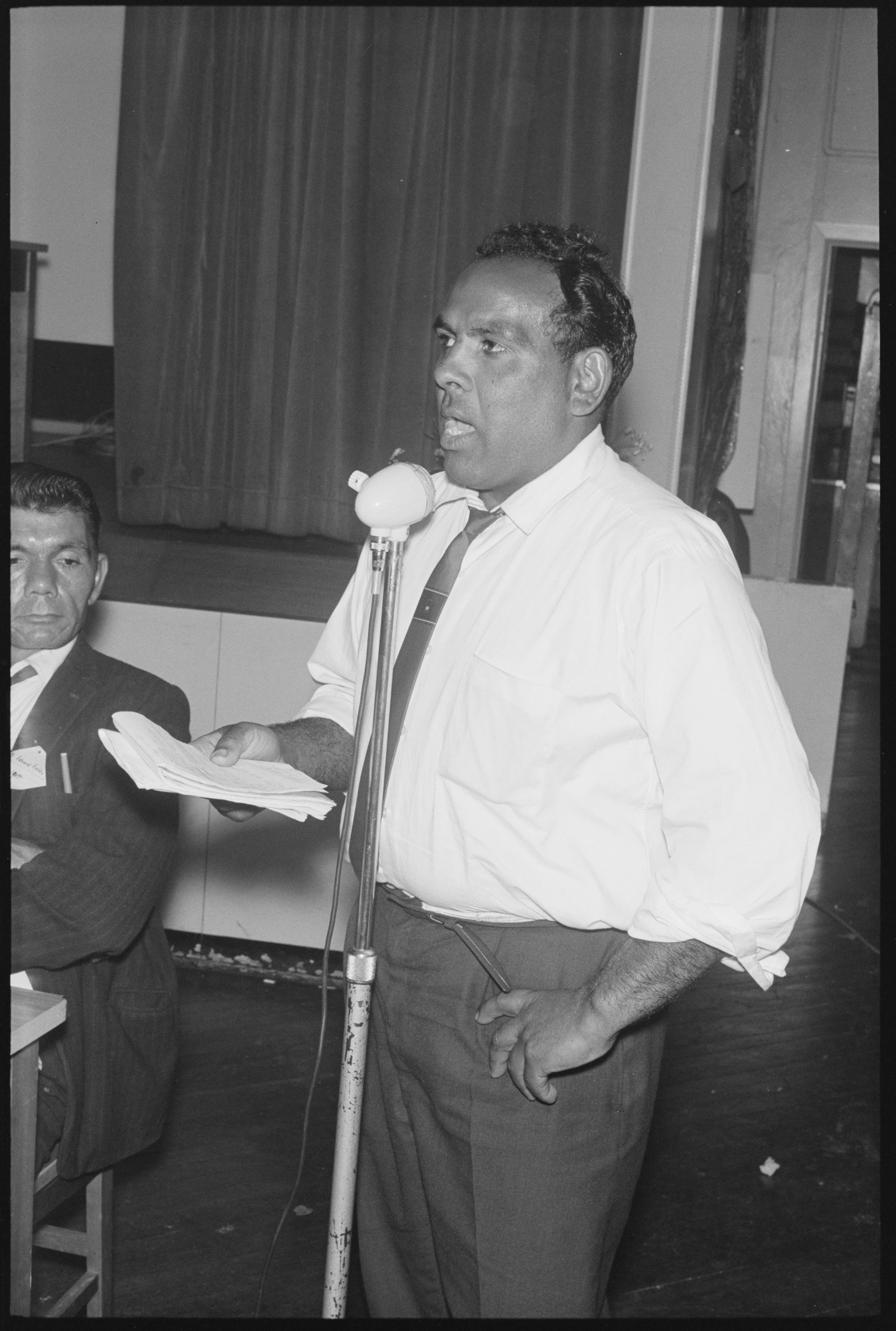
- Peckham in 1965
- Born: 24 June 1929; Bunyip, Victoria, Australia
- Died: 6 June 2025 (aged 95); Dubbo, New South Wales, Australia
- Other name: Uncle Ray
- Occupations: Aboriginal leader; political activist; social activist

Raymond Edward "Uncle Ray" Peckham (24 June 1929 – 6 June 2025) was an Aboriginal Australian activist and Wiradjuri man renowned for his lifelong advocacy of Indigenous rights. A pioneering figure in linking the Aboriginal rights movement with trade unions and socialist politics, he played a critical role in landmark campaigns against segregation and discrimination in mid-20th century Australia.

== Early life and education ==
Raymond Edward Peckham was born on 24 June 1929 in Bunyip, Victoria, one of 13 children to Tom and Linda Peckham. His formative years were spent at Talbragar Mission near Dubbo, New South Wales, during the Great Depression. His father, Tom, joined the Unemployed Workers' Movement (initiated by Communist Party activists) in 1931 and advocated against school segregation winning the NSW Labor Party to a position in support of full citizenship rights at the 1935 state conference. Tom was a member of the Aborigines Progressive Association (APA) and travelled to Sydney with Ray and his family for the famous Day of Mourning protest on 26 January 1938. The family became part of a community of Aboriginal activists in Dubbo centred around William Ferguson and the APA, which deeply influenced Peckham's political outlook.

Peckham's early schooling was on the Talbragar reserve, following a decision by Brocklehurst Public School to exclude Aboriginal pupils. He left high school at 15 and worked on farms and at a convent until 1947, briefly serving as a police tracker in Kempsey (1947–1949). During the 1949 floods, while assisting with food relief and rescue efforts, a newspaper photographer refused to include him in a group photo. It was only granted after his colleagues insisted that he was included, becoming an incident that shaped his views on Indigenous rights and deepened his commitment to activism.

== Activism ==
=== Early campaigns and international engagement ===
In 1950, Peckham moved to Sydney, where activist Pearl Gibbs introduced him to trade union networks. He became active in protests, strikes, and campaigns, and worked as a builder's labourer. He worked on projects including the Cahill Expressway and the State Office Block. During this period, Peckham and Gibbs worked to reform the Aborigines Progressive Association, demanding an end to the Protection Act and the NSW Aborigines Welfare Board that enabled policies including the forced removal of Aboriginal children. The Association had been started by William Ferguson in Dubbo in 1937. Peckham also joined the Aboriginal Rights Council (ARC).

In 1951, Peckham garnered national attention when he was elected as an ARC delegate to the World Festival of Youth and Students in East Berlin, part of the Soviet Bloc, alongside Faith Bandler. The Australian government initially denied him a passport, relenting only after maritime unions threatened to paralyse shipping.

Unbeknownst to Peckham, agents from the Australian Security Intelligence Organisation surveilled his departure, becoming the first Aboriginal activist to ever get an ASIO file, marking the beginning of decades-long monitoring that would result in one of the largest ASIO files in Australian history.

=== Union solidarity and rural campaigning ===
On returning from Europe, Peckham joined the Builders Labourers Federation (BLF) and the Newtown branch of the Communist Party of Australia (CPA), which was the only political party to oppose the White Australia policy at the time. He wrote for the party newspaper Tribune and attended political schools in Minto. He was arrested in 1959 under the Aborigines Protection Act for drinking in a pub. The BLF funded his travels to Aboriginal communities across New South Wales (NSW), enabling him to connect local campaigns with union and socialist movements.

In the lead-up to the 1965 Aboriginal-Australian Fellowship (AAF) state-wide conference, Peckham joined Pearl Gibbs and Ken Brindle on a tour of north-western New South Wales to encourage Aboriginal community members to attend. Peckham campaigned with the Federal Council for Aboriginal Advancement (FCAA), the first national body representing Aboriginal interests. The 1965 conference was notable for being wholly organised and led by Aboriginal people as a matter of principle, and formed part of a broader movement for Indigenous self-determination.

==== Landmark victories ====
- Horace Saunders Case (1961): Peckham led a campaign against the eviction of Aboriginal man Horace Saunders from Purfleet Mission. He rallied coal miners, steelworkers, and wharf labourers, whose support helped win a historic court victory against the Aborigines Protection Board as the first such defeat of the Board in NSW.
- 1967 Referendum: He was a prominent organiser for the "Yes" campaign, which amended the constitution to include Aboriginal people in censuses and federal policymaking. He worked alongside major figures like Faith Bandler and Charles Perkins, helping to build momentum for constitutional change.

Throughout the 1960s, Peckham fought segregation in rural NSW:

- Protested hospital exclusion in Moree.
- Exposed racist housing placement near a dump in Armidale.
- Investigated exploitative conditions for Aboriginal pea pickers.
- Secured union-backed petitions for Aboriginal housing in Coonamble and Nambucca Heads.

He connected Aboriginal struggles to international movements, speaking against the Vietnam War, apartheid in South Africa, U.S. segregation, and fascist regimes in Spain and Greece.

== Later life and death ==
Peckham returned to Dubbo in 1983, where he continued his activism and community work for the remainder of his life. In his later years, he helped organise the erection of a statue honouring William Ferguson in Dubbo's town centre as a tribute to his mentor and a reminder of the long struggle for justice.

In 2013, Uncle Ray Peckham was appointed the inaugural Elder-in-Residence at the Charles Sturt University Centre for Indigenous Studies at Dubbo in recognition of his many years of work to ensure equal opportunities for Indigenous people.

Peckham died on 6 June 2025, aged 96. He is remembered as a tireless campaigner who bridged Aboriginal rights and working-class solidarity. His activism helped lay the groundwork for the land rights and Indigenous rights movements of the 1960s and 1970s, as well as later decades of Aboriginal-led resistance.
