= Strangers in the Land =

Strangers in the Land may refer to:

- Strangers in the Land (play), a 1952 play by Mona Brand
- Strangers in the Land (book), a 2025 book by Michael Luo
