= Isobelle Mary Ferguson =

Aboriginal Australian nurse and activist (1926–2019)

Isobelle Mary Ferguson (18 February 1926 – 15 August 2019), also known as Isobelle McCallum and Isobelle Kent, was an Aboriginal Australian nurse and activist. She was the daughter of activist and leader Bill Ferguson, and was the first known Aboriginal person to train at the Royal Alexandra Hospital for Children in Camperdown, Sydney. She was active in the Aboriginal Affairs Association and the Aboriginal Affairs Association in the 1960s, and joined the Freedom Ride across regional New South Wales in 1965.

== Early life and education ==
Isobelle Mary Ferguson was born on 18 February 1926 at Euabalong, New South Wales. She was the seventh of twelve children of Wiradjuri man William (Bill) Ferguson, shearer (later activist), and his wife Margaret Mathieson (née Gowan). Her father was a Wiradjuri man who worked as a sheep shearer and became a prominent activist, co-founding the Aborigines Progressive Association (APA) along with Jack Patten in 1937.

The family moved to Dubbo in 1933, and Ferguson attended Dubbo High School.

Ferguson moved to Sydney in 1944, where she studied nursing at the Royal Alexandra Hospital for Children in Camperdown. This made her the first known Aboriginal person to train there.

The Dubbo Liberal And Macquarie Advocate reported in August 1945 that Ferguson had completed the first year of her training as a nurse at Camperdown Children's Hospital, and was enjoying annual leave first with her mother at a holiday resort and then with her family at Dubbo.

== Career ==
For the last six months of her training, Ferguson worked at the Royal Prince Alfred Hospital.

She was registered as a double-certificated nurse in March 1949. By June 1949 she was a fully qualified nursing sister employed at St Ives Hospital in Sydney.

In 1971, she and her second husband had bought Aminya Nursing Home in Caloundra, Queensland, expanded it, and sold it in 1974. Ferguson there as matron (Kent) until her retirement in 1986.

== Activism ==
Ferguson became honorary secretary in 1963–64 of the newly formed Aboriginal Affairs Association (later known as the Foundation for Aboriginal Affairs, or "Foundo"). The APA had been dissolved in 1944, but was revived by Herbert "Bert" Groves, Pearl Gibbs, and others in 1963, and Ferguson became honorary secretary of this too. She attended the Federal Council for Aboriginal Advancement conference as honorary state secretary, and read the APA report.

In late 1964 Ferguson and Joyce Clague (then Joyce Mercy), then vice-president of the APA, joined a three-week, 11,000-kilometre (7,000 mi) trip around outback NSW, Queensland, and the Northern Territory. She later said that before this trip, she had never experienced prejudice, but had several encounters on the trip where she was discriminated against. However, was optimistic about the future for Aboriginal people, saying that it was they who were "behind all bids to gain real and complete emancipation".

In February 1965, Ferguson took part in the Freedom Ride organised by University of Sydney students, led by Aboriginal student leader Charles Perkins, who at that time was vice president of the Foundo. On 27–29 August that year she joined an all-Aboriginal delegation led by Perkins travelled north to attempt to break the colour bar at the oasis hotel in Walgett, NSW. At a public meeting at the Returned Servicemen's League, she spoke about the importance of Aboriginal people uniting in order to further the cause of integration.

In March 1966, Ferguson was convenor of social activities at the Day of Mourning organised by the APA.

== Personal life and death ==
On 27 November 1947 Ferguson married John McCallum at Annandale, New South Wales, and they had a son called Owen. She was reportedly living in Melbourne around the time of her father's death in January 1950, but she and McCallum were living at Warragamba in NSW by 1954 and in 1958 moved to Centennial Park in Sydney. The couple divorced in 1968.

On 22 October 1971 Ferguson married Francis George Kent at the Wayside Chapel in Potts Point, Sydney, and in the same year the couple bought Aminya Nursing Home in Caloundra, Queensland. They expanded the premises and sold it in 1974, with Ferguson staying on as matron until she retired in 1986. Her marriage to Kent was dissolved in 1976.

She was also known as Isobelle McCallum and Isobelle Kent.

Ferguson died on 15 August 2019.
