= Ted Noffs =

Australian Methodist minister

Theodore Delwin Noffs (14 August 1926 – 6 April 1995) was a Methodist (later Uniting Church) minister who founded the Wayside Chapel in Kings Cross, Sydney, Australia, in 1964.

During the 1960s Noffs was attracted to what he saw as the life-affirming side of the movement. Aware of the problem of drug-abuse and the alienation of youth, he believed that they were "a part of the paraphernalia behind the revolution, the symbolism behind the revolt." Noffs sought fairness and equality for all. With a focus on the practical, he raised funding from both government and business to set up facilities for the disadvantaged; in many cases these projects were the first of their kind in Australia.

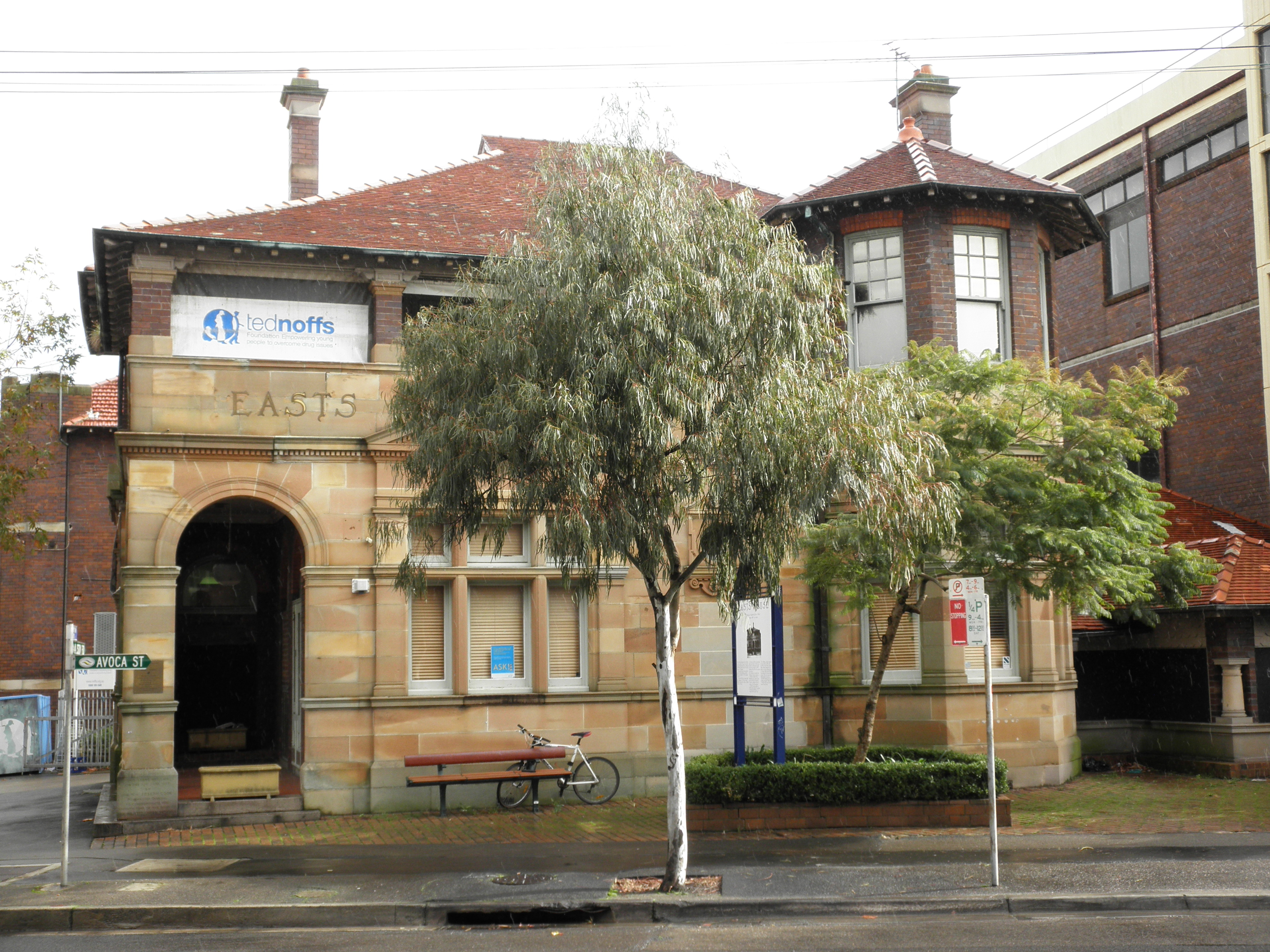
Ted Noffs Foundation headquarters, Randwick, Sydney

== Early life ==
Theodore Delwin Noffs was born 14 August 1926, in Mudgee, at the Rexton Private Hospital. He was educated initially at Parramatta High School, the University of Sydney and Leigh Theological College, Sydney. He entered the ministry in 1947 and was ordained in 1952, a year after he married Margaret Tipping who was to remain his lifelong companion and mother of their children Wesley, David and Theo. After further study in the USA where he gained an MA in rural sociology from Northwestern University, Chicago, and worked as a minister for the Wesley Church, also in Chicago, Noffs returned to Sydney where he took up the position of Assistant Pastor with the Central Methodist Mission from 1959 to 1964.

== Career ==
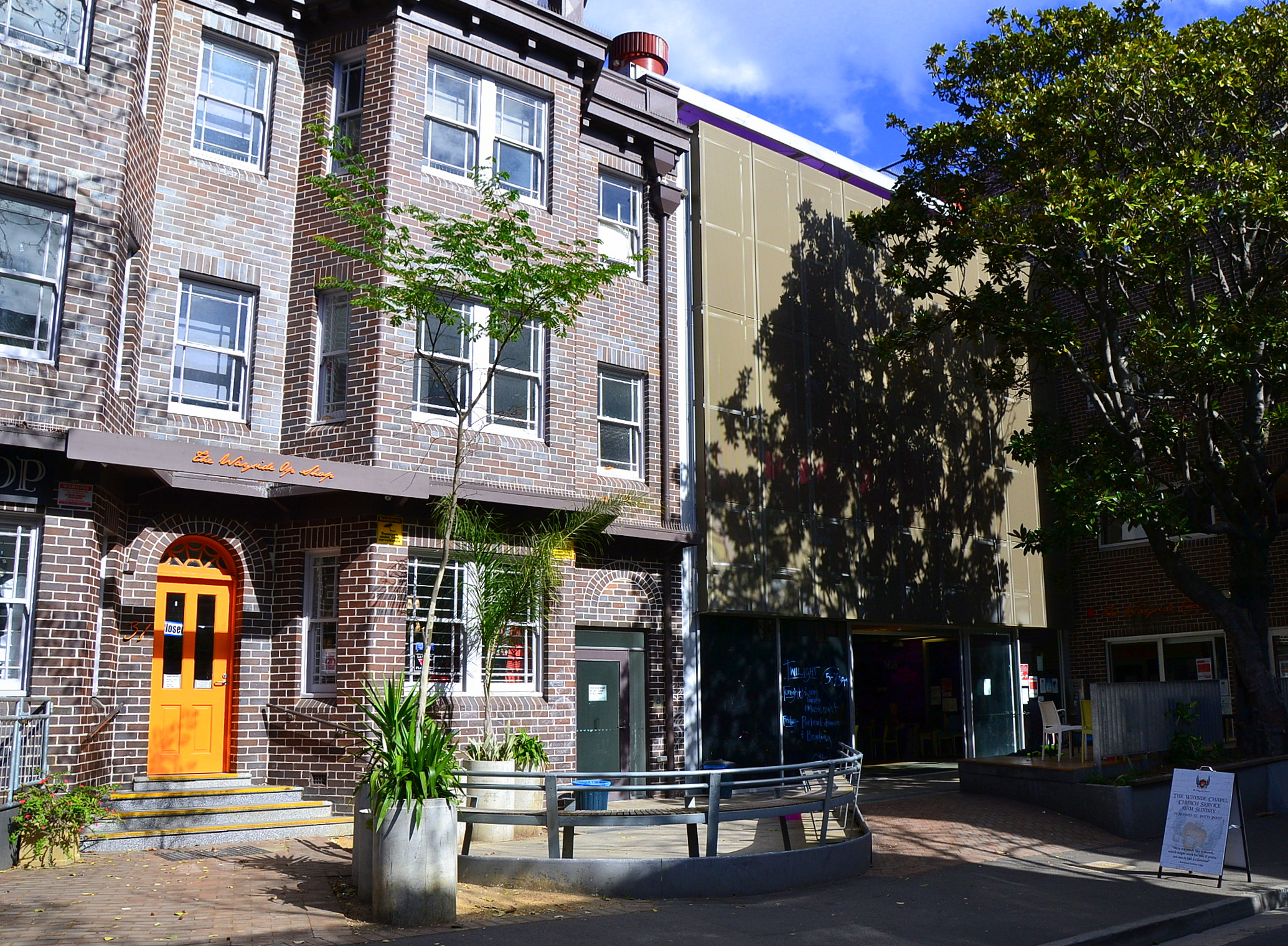
Wayside Chapel

In 1964 Noffs founded the Wayside Chapel and devoted the rest of his working life to a practical, energetic and sometimes controversial display of Christian principles. As part of his pastoral agenda, he established an unconditional relationship with drug-using youths, marginal intellectuals, eccentrics, down-and-outs and other denizens of Kings Cross, an area of Sydney known widely for its crime, drug-abuse, prostitution and, in the late 1960s, its flavour of Bohemian radicalism.

The Wayside Chapel was pivotal to the realisation of Ted Noffs' idiosyncratic ministry, becoming the focal point not only for regular church services, but also topical debates, small theatre productions, its own poetry magazine Cross Beat and an 'ideas journal' named Logos. With the added presence of a coffee-shop which was always well attended by a cross-section of 'types,' the chapel represented a dialectic which brought together several otherwise discrete social groups.

The potential drama quickly attracted the broadcast and print media, and controversy rapidly followed. In the Australia of 1964, as in most other Anglo-European cultures, churches were generally conservative, literally parochial in their outlook and areas of pastoral behaviour. The broader social context of the time was rapidly becoming one of debate and division, partly defined by the U.S. involvement in Vietnam which had escalated in the early 60s, becoming a cause celebre amongst large numbers of Western youth, adding to an already perceived polarisation of the generations and of political allegiances. All of this was grist for the mill for the many and disparate voices of the Wayside Chapel; although there were strictly adhered-to rules and guidelines at the chapel to preserve order Ted Noffs allowed, and was enthused by, the seemingly endless dialogue of viewpoints.

As race equality became more dramatically highlighted as an issue in the United States, with its main focus on the plight of the African-American, there was also a dawning local awareness of the inequalities and prejudice affecting the Australian indigenous population. In 1965, the activist Charles Perkins joined forces with Ted Noffs to plan and instigate the now-famous Freedom Ride. This initiative, in which a group led by Perkins drove by bus through towns in rural NSW including Moree, Wellington, Gulargambone, Lismore, Bowraville and Kempsey, was thought of initially by some of the participants as a mere fact-finding mission. In reality it rapidly became a source of controversy, not to mention rage, on both sides of an extremely pronounced racial divide. The Ride had been coordinated at the Wayside Chapel, which was to be, in the words of Perkins, 'our contact with all the newspapers, television and radio.' He continues, 'We did not think there would be much work involved but the chapel was completely swamped. Ted was involved with the media and political figures and with parents.'

It was also at this time that Noffs became increasingly concerned with what he began to see as the beginnings of an epidemic of drug abuse amongst the young. "I would say that we are moving, in our society, into a situation where drug abuse is the most contagious disease in the world among adolescents..."

== Personal life ==
Noffs was married to Margaret Noffs. He died on 6 April 1995.

== Oral History ==
Noffs was interviewed by Hazel de Berg in 1976 about his life including the church and his activism. This recording can be found at the National Library of Australia.

== Timeline ==
- 1963–64: Cofounder and first Chairman of the Foundation for Aboriginal Affairs

== Publications ==
- The Gates of Hell, Sydney:Wayside Press, 1964.
- The Wayside Chapel, London:William Collins, 1969.
- Cries, Australia:Compass Mountain Publishers, 1977.
- Drugs and People, Sydney:Ure Smith, 1977.
- By What Authority? Australia:Methuen, 1979.
- The Summit of Daring, Australia:Cassell, 1981.

== Legacy ==
In 1987, a tug was named Ted Noffs. It was built for Sydney Ports Corporation's Marine Towage and Salvage (MTS) at Forgacs Shipyard, Tomago, New South Wales and registered in Australia. As of 2022, it works at Port Botany, south of Sydney.
