= Michael Luo =

American journalist (born 1976)

- 羅明瀚
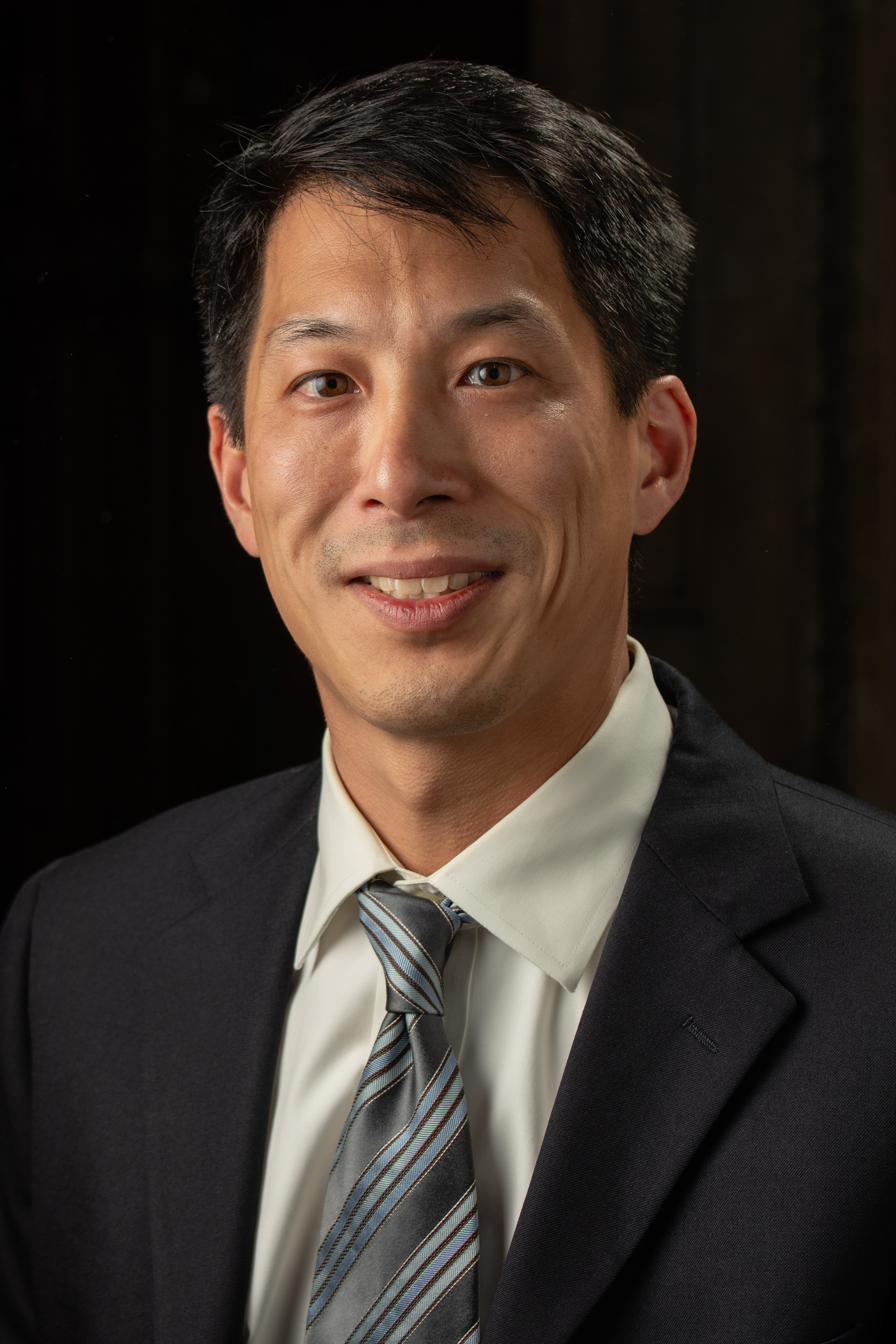
- Luo in 2018
- Born: 1976 (age 49–50); Pittsburgh, Pennsylvania, U.S.
- Education: Harvard University (BA)
- Occupations: Journalist; writer; editor
- Notable work: Strangers in the Land (2025)
- Awards: George Polk Award (2002) Livingston Award (2002)

Chinese name
- Traditional Chinese: 羅明瀚
- Simplified Chinese: 罗明瀚
Transcriptions
Standard Mandarin
- Hanyu Pinyin: Luó Mínghàn

Michael M. Luo (Chinese: 羅明瀚; pinyin: Luó Mínghàn; born 1976) is an American journalist who is the executive editor of The New Yorker and its website, newyorker.com. Previously, he wrote for The New York Times as an investigative reporter.

== Early life and education ==
Luo was born into a Taiwanese American family in Pittsburgh, Pennsylvania in 1976. His parents were waishengren who had fled mainland China during the Great Retreat . His father was raised in Tainan, Taiwan, and immigrated to the United States in 1967 to study for a doctorate in electrical engineering at the University of Chicago. Luo's mother came to the U.S. to earn a master's degree in accounting at Western Illinois University. His paternal grandfather was a Kuomintang general in the National Revolutionary Army who disappeared in 1948. Their ancestral home was in Hunan.

Luo spent his early childhood in upstate New York, and then attended high school in Michigan. He graduated from Harvard University with a Bachelor of Arts in government in 1998. As an undergraduate at Harvard College, he wrote for The Harvard Crimson.

== Career ==
Luo was a staff writer for two years for the Associated Press, where he wrote narrative feature stories, while also working at Newsday as a police reporter on Long Island. Luo reported for the Los Angeles Times before moving to The New York Times. In 2002, Luo received a George Polk Award for Criminal Justice Reporting and a Livingston Award for Young Journalists "for a series of articles on three poor, [disabled] African Americans in Alabama who were in prison for killing a baby that probably never existed." His story resulted in the release of two of the three prisoners, while the third remained in prison on a separate charge. In 2000, Luo won a T.W. Wang Award for Excellence for his journalism on Chinese-American topics.

In September 2003, Luo joined the metropolitan desk The New York Times. According to the Times, Luo "has written about economics and the recession as a national correspondent; covered the 2008 presidential campaign and the 2010 midterm elections; and done stints in Washington and in the Baghdad bureau." Luo wrote a piece in October 2016 that went viral about a woman who accosted him on the street for being a Chinese American.

Luo went on to edit investigations at The New Yorker, and was eventually promoted to manage the magazine's entire digital presence.

On April 29, 2025, Luo released a debut nonfiction book, Strangers in the Land, about the history of the Chinese in America.

== Personal life ==
Luo resides on the Upper East Side of Manhattan with his wife, Wenny. They have two daughters, Madeleine and Vivienne.
