= Bettie Fisher =

Australian Aboriginal musician and theatre manager

Bettie Fisher (c. 1939 – 12 May 1976) was an Australian Aboriginal musician and theatre manager of the Jerrinja people.

== Early life and education ==
Fisher was born at the Roseby Park Mission, now renamed the Jerrinja, in Orient Point, around 1939. Orient Point is a small village located in the Shoalhaven, on the South Coast of New South Wales, Australia, and is on the southern side of the mouth of the Crookhaven River, and adjoins the village of Culburra Beach to the south.

Jerrinja are a coastal "salt-water" peoples who have maintained a strong connection with their country. Her father was Leslie Amburlah and her mother was Christine née Connolly.

While Fisher was still a child, the family moved to Newcastle, where she attended Cardiff Public School until her expulsion aged twelve.

== Career ==
From about 1954, Fisher sang jazz and blues in clubs in both her native state and Queensland. With Jimmy Little and Freddy Little, she was a member of the first all-Aboriginal show touring New South Wales clubs for six years. Her television appearances included Bandstand on 2 December 1962, singing Up a Lazy River and Basin Street Blues, and Graeme Bell's Trad Jazz program. After she had stopped touring,

Fisher became a member of the executive committee of the Foundation for Aboriginal Affairs in 1971.

In early 1974, she became the first administrator of the newly reformed Black Theatre Arts and Cultural Centre. Under her leadership, the centre offered workshops in modern and traditional dancing, karate, photography, fashion design and modelling, and script writing. Fisher organised performances at the centre by visiting black artists, including Roberta Flack and Osibisa. The first play performed at the centre was The Chocolate Frog; Fisher was instrumental in having the play workshopped with prisoners in NSW jails. Fisher argued for the cast of another play, The Cake Man, to be Aboriginal only, with white characters played by black actors, as in the street theatre and short performances produced by the centre. The director, Bob Maza, disagreed, and discussions resulted in the casting of some non-Indigenous actors, including Max Cullen and Danny Adcock.

== Personal life and death ==
Fisher was married twice. Her first marriage, to a man called Fisher, was terminated by divorce, but she retained the name. In October 1974, Fisher married Tom Hogan, state coordinator of the NSW Builders Labourers Federation. Attendants at the wedding included Mum Shirl and Bobbi Sykes.

Fisher died in Royal South Sydney Hospital on 12 May 1976; the cause of death was coronary arteriosclerosis. Her ashes are buried at Botany Cemetery.
