= Mona Brand =

Australian playwright, poet and writer (1915–2007)

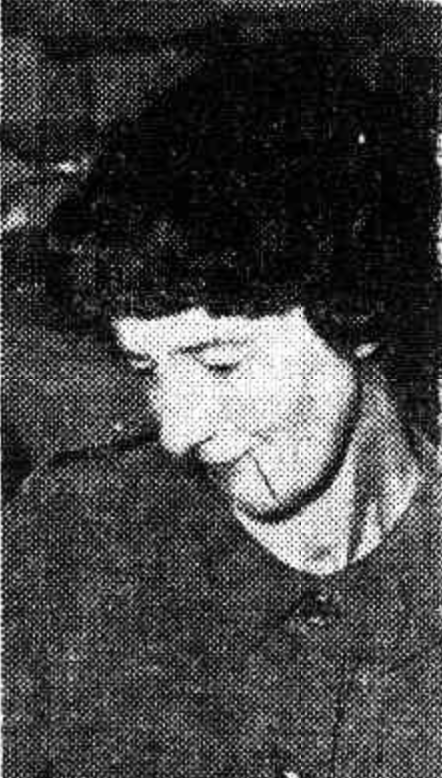
- Born: 22 October 1915; Sydney, New South Wales
- Died: 1 August 2007 (aged 91); Sydney, New South Wales
- Known for: Playwright, poetry, freelance writer, social activism
- Spouse: Len Fox

Mona Brand (22 October 1915 – 1 August 2007) was a twentieth-century Australian playwright, poet and freelance writer. She also wrote under the name Alexis Fox.

During her lifetime, Brand was better known in Europe than in Australia, to the extent that she subtitled her 1995 autobiography Enough Blue Sky: The Autobiography of Mona Brand… An Unknown Well-Known Writer.

== Early life ==
Brand was born in Sydney on 22 October 1915, to Alexander and Violet Brand (née Nixon). She had an older brother, John, and a younger, Deryck.

In the early 1930s, her father was second engineer on ship S.S. Cape Leeuwin servicing lighthouses and lightships between Brisbane and Darwin. There were literary influences in her family. In one letter to Brand, her father included an original poem The Carpentaria Lightship which she unsuccessfully attempted to have published in The Bulletin. Brand's mother, Violet Nixon, was the youngest daughter of journalist, government surveyor, architect and poet Francis Hodgson Nixon (1832–1883), whose collection of poetical pieces The Legends and Lays of Peter Perfume putatively 'collected, corrected and edited by Francis H' was published in Melbourne by F. F. Bailliere in 1865.

When Brand was seven years old, her mother died after a self-induced abortion, and she was sent to live with relatives in Rockhampton, attending the Rockhampton Girls Grammar School. At the age of eleven she moved back to Sydney, finishing her education at North Sydney Girls' High School. Brand wrote of her childhood feelings of displacement in her autobiography, Enough Blue Sky, which she published in 1995. She often felt the disparity between her own treatment and the treatment her brothers received, and noticed other disparities in class and race from an early age. She believed this informed her later writing and opinions. When she was in high school she aspired to become a journalist.

== Adult years ==
Brand's first job was as a copy-writer with The Sun in Sydney. During World War II, she worked as a social worker and then as a research officer for the Department of Labour and National Service (1945–48). She worked in London between 1948 and 1954, originally as a typist for the BBC, then in Hanoi, Vietnam in 1956–57 as an English teacher, subsequently returning to Australia.

On 26 September 1955 Mona married Len Fox, a journalist for the Communist Party, who was also a poet and fiction writer. Their marriage was, in the words of Brand's friends and herself, a "marriage of true minds". They remained together until his death in Sydney on 9 January 2004, aged 98.

=== Political views ===
Brand was a member of the Communist Party of Australia from 1947 to 1970 "making a clear distinction that she was a member of the Australian Communist Party, not the Soviet Party." She was quoted as saying, "when I joined the Communist Party it was not so much because I agreed with Karl Marx (of whom I had read little) as because I felt he and his followers agreed with me." Brand was noted in the translation of Better a Millstone as a "progressive Australian writer."

Much of Brand's social activism was expressed through her work, and particularly through her relationship with New Theatre. Most of her plays carry clear political messages.

One of her most popular plays, Here Comes Kisch, discusses the events of Egon Kisch's exclusion from Australia in 1935. Kisch, a communist and Anti-Nazi who was prohibited from entering Australia, is portrayed throughout the play as an intelligent, down to earth man, while the German officials are written as sycophants. Other notable political plays include Our 'Dear' Relations, a play which satirises the consumerism of Mother's Day and discusses the disadvantage of the working class within the capitalist system, Better a Millstone, which concerns injustice in the criminal sentencing of youth in England and draws on the Derek Bentley case, and Here Under Heaven, a play about sexism and racism, both towards Asians and Aboriginals.

Brand was a prominent member of the NSW Branch of the Aboriginal-Australian Fellowship, and was a strong advocate of Aboriginal rights. With Fox, she campaigned for a 'yes' vote in the 1967 referendum to have Aboriginal Australians recognised in the Australian Constitution, as noted by Governor General, Sir William Deane at the Reconciliation Convention in 1997.

In 1956, Brand travelled to Vietnam to assist the Vietnamese revolution through her affiliations with the CPA. She assisted Radio Hanoi and the Voice of Vietnam, especially with English translations, returning to Australia the following year.

The Australian Security Intelligence Organisation (ASIO) held a security file on Brand from 1950, detailing her movements and activities. The file was 379 pages long when it was released from closed access. Brand read the file herself, and expressed her distaste for ASIO's actions in a satirical piece in The Sydney Morning Herald in 2002.

=== Literary career ===
Brand joined the Victorian Branch of the Fellowship of Australian Writers during the war years, discussing her early works with fellow writers Leonard Mann, Frank Dalby Davison, and Vance Palmer. After the war she joined the Melbourne Realist Writer's Group, where her first play Here Under Heaven was read. This group, which included writers Frank Hardy and Eric Lambert, recommended the play to Melbourne New Theatre and it was performed in 1948. Its production that year by Louie Dunn won several prizes.

Brand began writing theatre with a one-act play for an evening aid event for the Red Cross. The plays needed to have women only casts because the event was being run and organised by the Presbyterian Ladies' College, Sydney. Her cousin was part of the event and was given a play to perform which she didn't like. Being roommates with Brand at the time, she asked if Brand could write something better for her that weekend. Brand agreed and wrote her first one-act play, a comedy about the learning curves of first aid treatments titled First Aid.

Brand travelled extensively overseas, going first to London in 1948. She attempted to interest London theatre groups with her work but was told that London audiences would not be interested in plays about Australia. During the five and a half years she was in the UK (1948–1953) Brand was active in London's Unity Theatre which shared common views with the New Theatre in Australia. During this time away Brand wrote Strangers in the Land which was set in a Malayan bungalow. As this play dealt with the Malayan Emergency, an issue of current interest, Brand hoped that the British would be interested in it. It was produced by the Unity Theatre in 1950 and then banned in the UK. It was later performed in Australia, the USSR, Czechoslovakia, East Germany and India.

Better a Millstone is a notable social realist play. Written in 1953, the play was inspired by the Derek Bentley case, which saw a young, illiterate man hanged for being involved in a robbery that led to the murder of a policeman. Brand centres the play around the campaign for a posthumous pardon. She uses the play to consider issues of child abuse, commercial exploitation and the criminalisation of young people. The political nature of this play and the issues confronted are reflected in the title's biblical reference, "It were better for him that a millstone were hanged about his neck and he cast into the sea, than that he should offend one of these little ones." (Luke 17.2) Brand makes the point that while the world treated her character, 'Ronnie' (i.e. Derek), poorly as a child the world took no responsibility for him when things went wrong.

=== Associations with New Theatre ===
Sydney's New Theatre, was concerned with the development of Australian women playwrights in the mid 20th century and provided unique insights of war and isolation, presenting feminist cases of internationalism. New Theatre has defined their philosophy in several ways since its establishment in the 1930s: from the slogan Art is a Weapon to the more recent Theatre with a Purpose.

It has been suggested that one of the reasons for Brand's artistic "isolation" from Australian Professional Theatre is due to her left-wing leanings and association with New Theatre. While it is relatively under-recognised in Australian theatre history, she did, in fact, have more plays produced, world-wide, than many other well-known Australian playwrights, for example, David Williamson, but within Australia none of Brand's plays was professionally produced during her lifetime.

It is more likely that Brand's isolation from mainstream Australian theatre was due to the political and literary context of the period in which she wrote and to the wider treatment of progressive playwrights and writers in that period. With a conservative mainstream theatre industry dominant in Australia at the time, some moderately socialist or feminist playwrights such as Brand found an outlet in the New Theatre or repertory theatre movement which supported socialist and socially aware art movements. The flow-on effect of the lack of recognition in the mainstream was an increased association with the left and a further 'tainting' of these writers' reputations. During this period the New Theatre struggled for recognition, particularly in Sydney, as for fifteen years the commercial press did not publish reviews of their productions. Brand's works were, however, well received in Britain, Russia, China, Czechoslovakia, Hungary, Germany, Rumania, Poland, Latvia and India.

Her involvement with New Theatre spanned more than three decades and allowed her to write more than twenty plays. She defined New Theatre productions as "either overtly or by implication suggesting that there were great weaknesses in capitalism and strengths to be found in socialism." Personally, she attempted to address humanitarian issues in preference to the ideas of feminism. This is obvious in her amateur play, In Search of Aphra, about which she said that she did not write the play as a consciously feminist work. Instead, she felt the injustice for the protagonist and wrote the work from a humanitarian point of view. Brand also regarded feminist literature at the time as a little irrational when words were simply changed to sound feminine rather than masculine. New Theatre is still running to this day. The New Theatre Archive is held by the State Library of NSW. The collection has papers of Mona Brand including lectures, playscripts, musicals and poems.

== Works ==
=== Plays ===
Title	First Performed (when known)/awards	First Published (when known)
Strangers in the Land	1950 - 21 November, Unity Theatre, London	1954 – Two Plays about Malaya (London: Lawrence& Wishart), 13–55
No Strings Attached	1958 – 4 October, Sydney New Theatre	1965 – Mona Brand – plays (Moscow: progress Pupl)
Better A Millstone	1954 – 27 November, Sydney New Theatre	1965 – Mona Brand – plays (Moscow: progress Pupl)
Here Under Heaven	1948 – 29 May, Melbourne New Theatre	1969 – Three Plays (Sydney: Wentworth Press, 137–188)
Barbara	1966 – 20 August, Sydney New Theatre	1969 – Three Plays (Sydney: Wentworth Press, 3-69)
Our 'Dear' Relations	1963 – 25 May, Sydney New Theatre	1969 – Three Plays (Sydney: Wentworth Press, 71–134)
Flying Saucery	1970 – 20 June, Sydney New Theatre	1973 – An Australian Space Fantasy for Children (Sydney, limited to 250 copies)
First Aid	1940 – May 1940, Melbourne, Production awarded first prize by Brett Randall	-
Butcher's Hook	-	-
School For Thought	-	-
Out of Commission	1955 – 26 March, Sydney New Theatre	-
Fission Chips	1959 – 11 April, Sydney New Theatre	-
Hold the Line (aka The Land of Teletap)	1960 – 25 November, Sydney New Theatre	-
Snowy!	1963 – Broadcast by the Australian Broadcasting Commission, Channel 2, 8 May	-
Come All Ye Valiant Miners	1965 – 5 June, Sydney New Theatre	-
You've Never Had It So Good	1965 – 11 December, Sydney New Theatre	-
On Stage Vietnam (Co-author with Patrick Barnett)	1967 – 10 June, Sydney New Theatre	1967 - Self-published
Going, Going, Gone	1968 – 23 November, Sydney New Theatre	-
Hotel	1968 – 26 July, Sydney New Theatre	-
Exposure 70	1970 – 15 May, Sydney New Theatre	-
One of Our Patients	1970 – September, Second place in City of Sydney Eisteddfod	-
Bumps and Grinds	1971 – 28 May, Physics Theatrette	-
Highway	1971 – 9 September, Union Theatre	-
It's Time To Boil Billy	1972 – 12 August, Sydney New Theatre	-
The Ghost of Grey Gables	1973 – 15 December, The Holiday Theatre, Wesley Auditorium	-
And A Happy New Year	1976 – 27 March, Sydney New Theatre	-
The Pirates of Pal Mal	1977 – 3 December, Sydney New Theatre	-
Who'd Be a Shop Steward	1979 – 20 April (first screened)	-

Unperformed works include: 'The Silent People', 'Flood Tide', 'Pavement Oasis', 'Inbye', 'Koorie Song', 'Hammer and Stars' and Here Comes Kisch, which was performed as a reading at the Australian Playwrights Conference in 1982.

Works published in other countries include Here Under Heaven (1956) and Strangers in the Land (1961) in Russian as well as Better a Millstone (1957) and Strangers in the Land (1957) in Chinese.;

=== Poetry ===
Brand had four collections of poetry published and had numerous individual poems published in newspapers and periodicals during her career.

Her first published poem 'Shy as a Deer' appearing in The Australasian in 1928 when she was 12 years old. The poem was written for her father and speaks about her "shy as a deer" mother, Violet, who had died some years earlier. This Night, another early poem was inspired by the second line of Brand's favourite Wordsworth's sonnet: "This Sea that bares her bosom to the moon."

==== Influences ====
Brand early poetry was strongly influenced by English poets and are somewhat imitative of William Wordsworth, John Keats, Percy Bysshe Shelley, Wilfred Owen, Siegfried Sassoon, Walter de la Mare and Edna St Vincent Millay. In her early work, she preferred a regular rhyme scheme to free verse although she adopted whichever suited the idea.

In the late 1930s, Brand cancelled a planned overseas trip because of the outbreak of World War II. Her poetic focus during this period therefore was on the social and political environment in Australia as well as the unique Australian landscape and seascape. This also became a time for her development as a writer because she met Melbourne Workers' Educational Association tutor, William Fearn Wannan, who influenced and taught her. She also became friends with a Brisbane poet, James Devaney, who introduced her to John Shaw Neilson, who Brand thought was Australia's finest lyric poet.

During the 1960s, Brand began to write verse narration for Margaret Barr's dance dramas. At this period, Brand also collaborated with modern composer, John Antill. Barr and Antill both insisted on free verse format, which changed Brand's writing styles to some extent.

==== Poetry collections ====
- Wheel and Bobbin (1938)

Brand's friends voluntarily helped her to publish 500 copies of the collection. The foreword was written by Dame Mary Gilmore, who pointed out that Brand's poetry was "direct and simple".

Contents: Homespun, Hyde Park Fountain, The Miser, Sequence, Sympathy (In Mid Winter), The Fashionable Hat, From A Station Bridge, Ageless, Vigil, Aspiration of An Earth Worm, Wander Through, Dream Garden, Shutters, The Queen's Breakfast, Death, Translation of ODE VII BY Horace, Pround Chime, Easter Hymn, The Primrose Flower, Forgetting, Zinnias, Radio Greeting, Sad Tale of a Musical Dove, The Idle Roam, This Night, My Song, Going up, A Simple Lesson

- Silver Singing (1940)

The cover was designed by Albert Collins. "The fact that the fine pen and ink drawing depicted a popular tree suggests my continuing pre-occupation with non-indigenous landscape features."

Contents: Promise, Clues, Silver Singing, Man's Destiny, Collins Street, The Civilised, The Blue Gum (Outside My Window), Twilight, Australian Christmas (Or Coming up to Scratch), The White Tree, Outside, Chintz, Panorama, At the Ballet, Eternity, The Idle Roam, The Miser, Zinnias, This Night, My Song, Hyde Park Fountain, Sequence, Going Up, Vigil.

- Lass in Love (1946)

The cover was designed by Brand herself.

Contents: Lass in love, Young Mother, Sound and Sea, The Trust, Symphony of Man, Christmas Tree, Tomorrow, The Willow, Finale, Soundless, Cacophony, Instrument, All I Know, These Hands, To John (1940), Aconite ( Monk's Hood), Seashore, Sale Ad, Parrots, "Where Are Those Thine Accusers?", White Heels, To a Poet.

- Coloured Sounds (1997)

This collection includes "some previously unpublished pieces, as well as others that have appeared in the print media or have been performed in association with stage and television productions".

Contents: Three sections, organised by date of composition. 1928-1938: The Idle Roam, Zinnias, This Night, Hyde Park Fountain, My Song, The Miser, Forgetting, Ageless, Aspiration of an Earth Worm, Translation of Ode VII by Horace, Shy as a Deer, To A Fellow Poet.

1938-1946: These Hands, The Willow, Lass in Love, The White Tree, Soundless, All I Know, Cacophony, Instrument, Twilight, Man's Destiny, Panorama, Collins Street, The Blue Gum, Promise, Seashore, Sound and Sea, Parrots, Aconite (Monk's Hood), Sympathy, Silver Singing, Young Mother, The Civilised, Symphony of Man, Australian Christmas, At the Ballet, Eternity, The Trust, Clues, To John (1940), Sale Ad, Christmas Tree, Tomorrow.

Since 1946: Span, After Lunch, Snowy!, The Toast of Toorak, On our Blindness, Sonnet for Stream Street, Woolloomooloo, Middle Age, Highway, Ben Hai River, The Student, Halong Bay, Hai Thon, Song of Vietnam, Twenty Summers, Sonnet for a Sunday, Sonnet for Two Cities, How a Sound can Grow, Harbour Journey, Indian Ocean, Bombay Wharf, Therapy, Deep South Deep Freeze, Amarilla.

=== Short stories and other works ===
- The Fairie's Ladder (1925)

Brand published the short story 'The Fairie's Ladder' in Artesia on 16 January 1925, when she was 9 years old.

- Daughters of Vietnam (1958)

This collection contains short stories and poetry. The short stories in this collection are based on conversations between the author and Vietnamese women from a variety of backgrounds which she had while in North Vietnam. Brand wrote, "my husband [Len Fox] and I talked with women in various parts of North Vietnam - peasants in small cottages on the delta and at the seashore, miners at Hongay-Campha and the people belonging to the various national minorities in the new Thai-Meo autonomous region of the North West." Three of the stories "can more correctly be described as biographies because they describe events almost exactly as they took place, with the exception of the creation of a few minor characters." Other stories have been given a more fictional treatment.

Contents: Short Stories: Return to Life, The Little Messenger, Down Dragon, Voice in the Jungle, Once More Flowers Blossom. Poetry: The Sun Rises, Hai Thon, Halong Bay, The Student, Song of Vietnam.

- Twenty Summers - Lyrics for a song recorded by Gary Shearston
- Enough Blue Sky: the Autobiography of Mona Brand, an Unknown Well-Known Playwright (1995) - Brand's self-published autobiography.

== Later years and death ==
The second wave of feminism and the rise of the discipline of women's studies at universities in the 1980s, which frequently worked towards reclaiming women's history, saw an increased recognition of Brand's work and career in Australia. Although none of her plays were ever professionally produced in Australia, as a recognition of her important contribution to theatre in Australia, Christine M. Tilley undertook a detailed study in 1981 of Brand's plays and her political activism. Tilley collected many scripts and production details and as a result of her work, many of Brand's original manuscripts and letters are now held by the Fryer Library at the University of Queensland, Brisbane. Posters, ephemera and a large collection of Vietnamese art collected by Mona Brand are held at the State Library of NSW.

Brand died in Sydney on 1 August 2007.

== Recognition ==
- Our 'Dear' Relations won first prize in NSW Arts Council Drama Festival (1963)
- Christmas Goose won Moomba Prize for Children's Film Script (1972)
- For Richer For Poorer won Noosa Arts Theatre Prize (1985)
- Awarded life membership of New Theatre
- Awarded life membership of PEN
- Lass in Love won James Picot Memorial Competition for 1945 conducted by Queensland Artists Association.

== Legacy ==
=== Len Fox Painting Prize ===
Brand initiated the Len Fox Painting Prize, also called Len Fox Painting Award, in her husband's memory. From 2011 and bi-annually the Castlemaine Art Museum invites entrants from amongst living Australian artists who are to represent in painting their reactions to the art and life of Emanuel Phillips Fox whose first biography was written by Len Fox in 1985. One winner is awarded $50,000 and their painting acquired for the collection of the Art Museum. It is amongst the richest painting prizes in Australia.

Winners

- 2011: Lynn Miller, Winter storm, Bay St, Brighton
- 2013: Judy Drew, The silk gown
- 2015: Prudence Flint, Wash
- 2019: Betty Kuntiwa Pumani, Antara
- 2022: Greg Creek, Killing Jar

=== Mona Brand Award ===
In 2016 the biennial Mona Brand Award, also known as the Mona Brand Award for Women Stage and Screen Writers, worth A$30,000, was inaugurated by the State Library of NSW Foundation, following a bequest from Brand's estate. It is awarded to "an outstanding Australian woman writing for the stage or screen". The bequest included funding of a biennial Emerging Writer Award, later renamed the Early Career Writer Award, worth A$10,000 for a "female writer who is in the early stages of her career for her first professionally produced, screened or broadcast work".

Winners, Mona Brand Award

- 2016: Joanna Murray-Smith
- 2018: Patricia Cornelius
- 2020: Kate Mulvany
- 2022: Andrea James
- 2024: Belinda Chayko
- 2026: Jane Harrison

Winners, Early Career Writing Award

- 2016: Jada Alberts
- 2018: Lucy Knox
- 2020: Anchuli Felicia King
- 2022: Sukhjit Khalsa
- 2024: Hannah Carroll Chapman
- 2026: Emmanuelle Mattana

== Sources ==
- Mona Brand Papers held at the Fryer Library at The University of Queensland. Finding aid available: https://manuscripts.library.uq.edu.au/index.php/uqfl401
- Brand, Mona, Enough Blue Sky: the Autobiography of Mona Brand, an Unknown Well-Known Writer (Tawny Pipit: Sydney, 1995)
- Brand, Mona, Here Comes Kisch, (Montmorency, Victoria: Yackandanda Playscripts, 1983).
- Brand, Mona, Here Under Heaven : Three plays containing 'Barbara', 'Our 'dear' relations', 'Here under Heaven' (Sydney: Wentworth Press, 1969).
- Brand, Mona, Plays, (Moscow: Progress Publishers, 1965).
- Brand, Mona, Coloured sounds : poems (Sydney: Tawny Pipit Press,1997).
- Brand, Mona Wheel and Bobbin (Sydney: Deaton and Spencer, 1938).
- Brand, Mona. Silver Singing (Sydney : Author, 1938).
- Brand, Mona. Daughters of Vietnam (Hanoi: Foreign Language Publications House, 1958).
- Brand, Mona. Lass in Love (Northcote: Cloister Press, 1946)
- Tilley, Christine M., 'Mona Brand: A Checklist, 1935-1980' Australian Literary Studies 10 (1981–2)
- Moore, Nicole, 'Art Makes the World' Overland, 01/12/2007, Issue 189, p93-94,
- New Theatre, The New Years 1932-, (Sydney: University Publishing Service, University of Sydney, 2007)
- Yu, Ouyang, 'A Century of Oz Lit in China', Antipodes, 25.1 (Jun 2011): 65–71.
- Sendy, J., Comrades Come Rally. (Nelson: Melbourne, 1978)
- Tompkins, Joanne and Julie Holledge, eds., Performing Women/Performing Feminisms: Interviews with International Women Playwrights, (Brisbane: Australasian Drama Studies Association, 1997)
- 'Australian Drama 1920-1955', (Papers presented to a conference on Australian drama, University of New England, Armidale, 1–4 September 1984).
- Pfisterer, Susan and Carolyn Pickett, Playing with ideas: Australian Women Playwrights from the suffragettes to the sixties, (Sydney: Currency Press, 1999).
- New Theatre, http://newtheatre.org.au
- Hay, Ashley. 'Mona Brand, 1915–2007.' Sydney Pen Magazine (June 2008): 44
- AustLit: The Australian Literature Resource http://www.austlit.edu.au
- Who's Who of Australian Writers. Melbourne: Thorpe, 1991.
- Openbook Magazine, State Library NSW, Winter 2019.
