= Joyce Clague =

Australian Aboriginal political activist (1938–2024)

Joyce Caroline Clague MBE (née Mercy; 22 July 1938 – 25 September 2024) was an Aboriginal Australian political activist and Yaegl elder. Her activism centred on social change for Indigenous Australians. She was influential in instigating the 1967 Constitutional Referendum and in the 1996 native title claim, known as Yaegl #1, which was settled in 2015.

== Early years ==
Joyce Caroline Mercy was born on 22 July 1938 in the New South Wales town of Maclean, one of 15 children. Although Aboriginal children attending mission schools were strongly discouraged from speaking their mother tongues, Clague learned the Yaegl language to communicate with her grandparents and maintain a strong connection to her culture.

As a teenager, she studied nursing in Sydney.

== Career and activism ==
Clague met and became friends with leading members of the Aboriginal-Australian Fellowship and became a member of the Aborigines Progressive Association. In 1960, she attended the third Federal Council for Aboriginal Advancement conference at Newport, Sydney. She found encouragement in a visiting activist, Jack Horner.

In late 1964 Clague (then Mercy) and fellow nurse and activist Isobelle Mary Ferguson, who was honorary secretary of the Aboriginal Affairs Association, joined a three-week, 11,000-kilometre (7,000 mi) journey around outback New South Wales, Queensland, and the Northern Territory, to experience and witness discrimination against Aboriginal people in those regions.

She was influential in instigating the 1967 Constitutional Referendum. Following the 1967 referendum, she worked with musician Jimmy Little on a campaign to get Indigenous Australians on the electoral roll. She also appeared in the film about the 1967 referendum, Vote Yes for Aborigines.

In 1968, she stood for the Legislative Council of the Northern Territory, with her independent campaign encouraging the enrolment of 6500 Aboriginal people. She convened the Federal Council for Advancement of Aborigines (FCAATSI) in 1969. She was also appointed a representative of the World Churches Commission to Combat Racism. She was elected as Northern Territory state secretary at the 1972 FCAATSI conference. She also worked in the Office of the New South Wales Ombudsman as an assistant investigation officer. She was a founding member of and served two terms as the New South Wales Women's Advisory Council to the Premier.

In the 1980s, she stood for pre-selection for Australian Labor Party seats in both houses of the Parliament of New South Wales. She was also a member of the Australian Republic Movement. Beginning in 1987, she was treasurer and member of the Metropolitan Land Council.

The Nungera Museum in Maclean was largely her initiative. After ending her involvement with the project, the museum ultimately failed.

In 1986, Clague was the first Aboriginal person to become a trustee on the Australian Museum Trust.

== Native title claim ==
In November 1996, she and Della Walker lodged a native title claim, known as Yaegl #1, that encompasses a large stretch of the Clarence River and its tributaries, on behalf of the Yaegl people. This was successfully settled at a Federal Court of Australia consent determination hearing in 2015, ending what had been the oldest legal matter before the court.

== Recognition and honours ==
In 1977, Clague was awarded the Member of the Order of the British Empire. Her father encouraged her to accept the honour on behalf of Aboriginal people. She referred to the MBE as More Black than Ever.

== Personal life ==
Clague married Colin, an Anglo-Australian whose ancestors came from the Isle of Man, about two years after they met at a Christian youth conference in the Philippines in 1964. The 2007 documentary When Colin Met Joyce, written and produced by Pauline Clague, the third of her four daughters, concerns their relationship.

Clague died on 25 September 2024 at the age of 85.

== Works ==
- Clague, Joyce (1981), Good news to the poor
- North Coast Institute of Aboriginal Community Education (N.S.W.); Craigie, Cathy; Kelly, G; Clague, Joyce (1984), Aboriginal studies kit, Lismore, NSW
- Clague, Joyce, 'Staying to the end', in Scutt, Jocelynne A. (ed.), Glorious age : growing older gloriously, Artemis, Melbourne, 1993.
