= Strangers in the Land: Exclusion, Belonging, and the Epic Story of the Chinese in America =

2025 debut nonfiction book by Michael Luo

- Author: Michael Luo
- Publisher: Doubleday
- Publication date: April 29, 2025
- Pages: 560
- ISBN: 978-0-385-54857-1

Strangers in the Land: Exclusion, Belonging, and the Epic Story of the Chinese in America is a debut nonfiction book by New Yorker writer Michael Luo. The book traces the history of Chinese Americans from the mid-nineteenth century to the present. It was published by Doubleday on April 29, 2025.

== Background ==
In 2016, Luo wrote an open letter, in The New York Times, to a woman who had hurled a racist insult to Luo and his family on a street on the Upper East Side of Manhattan. The open letter then became viral on social media, after which Luo considered writing an entire book about the lineage of the Chinese in America. Through the COVID-19 pandemic, Luo began working on Strangers in the Land while at the same time writing several pieces in The New Yorker about incidents of hate crimes against Asian Americans, such as the 2021 Atlanta spa shootings.

Luo's research for the book required extensive investigation into archives wherein he found "various episodes known among historians but usually overlooked by the general public" such as a massacre in Los Angeles in 1871 which took the lives of 17 Chinese people, the Supreme Court case United States v. Wong Kim Ark in 1898, the expulsion of Chinese residents from many neighborhoods across America, and many others. Amid rising xenophobia against immigrant communities in the 2020s, Luo felt that it was imperative to understand "how fury about an entire people can spill over the way it did against Chinese immigrants at the end of the nineteenth century."

An excerpt of the book, "When an American Town Massacred Its Chinese Immigrants," was published in The New Yorker on March 3, 2025.

== Critical reception ==
The book was considered a widely anticipated release of 2025 by Time and The New York Times. Time later called the book one of the best releases of April 2025.

In a starred review, Kirkus Reviews called the book "An estimable and vital work of history that honors the Chinese American experience" and said that any reader of American history, not just Chinese American history, would find a lot to appreciate in its pages.

Steve Inskeep, writing for The New York Times, called the book a convincing account of Chinese migration and lauded the depth of Luo's "fascinating details" and "biographies of individuals—a range of quirky and fascinating figures, both Chinese and white, who drive the narrative." Inskeep found no weakness to the book other than the challenge of its breadth: "He offers us so many characters that it can be hard to keep track, but readers who do are rewarded with a view on the full complexity of American immigration."

Bloomberg News called the book "a terrifying yet compelling narrative," a "deeply researched and heartbreaking rendition of blighted lives, crippled promises and murderous politics," and a revealing part of "an ugly and violent saga, suffuse with race hatred, gunfire and lynching, greed and cruelty—and the twisting of American ideals to win votes and sate bloodthirsty populist furies."

Axios called the book "powerful and engaging" in its "story about Chinese Americans that isn't taught in schools," as well as identified Luo's book as a contribution to history in a manner like that of Ronald Takaki or Erika Lee's works.
