= Wayside Chapel =

Australian charity

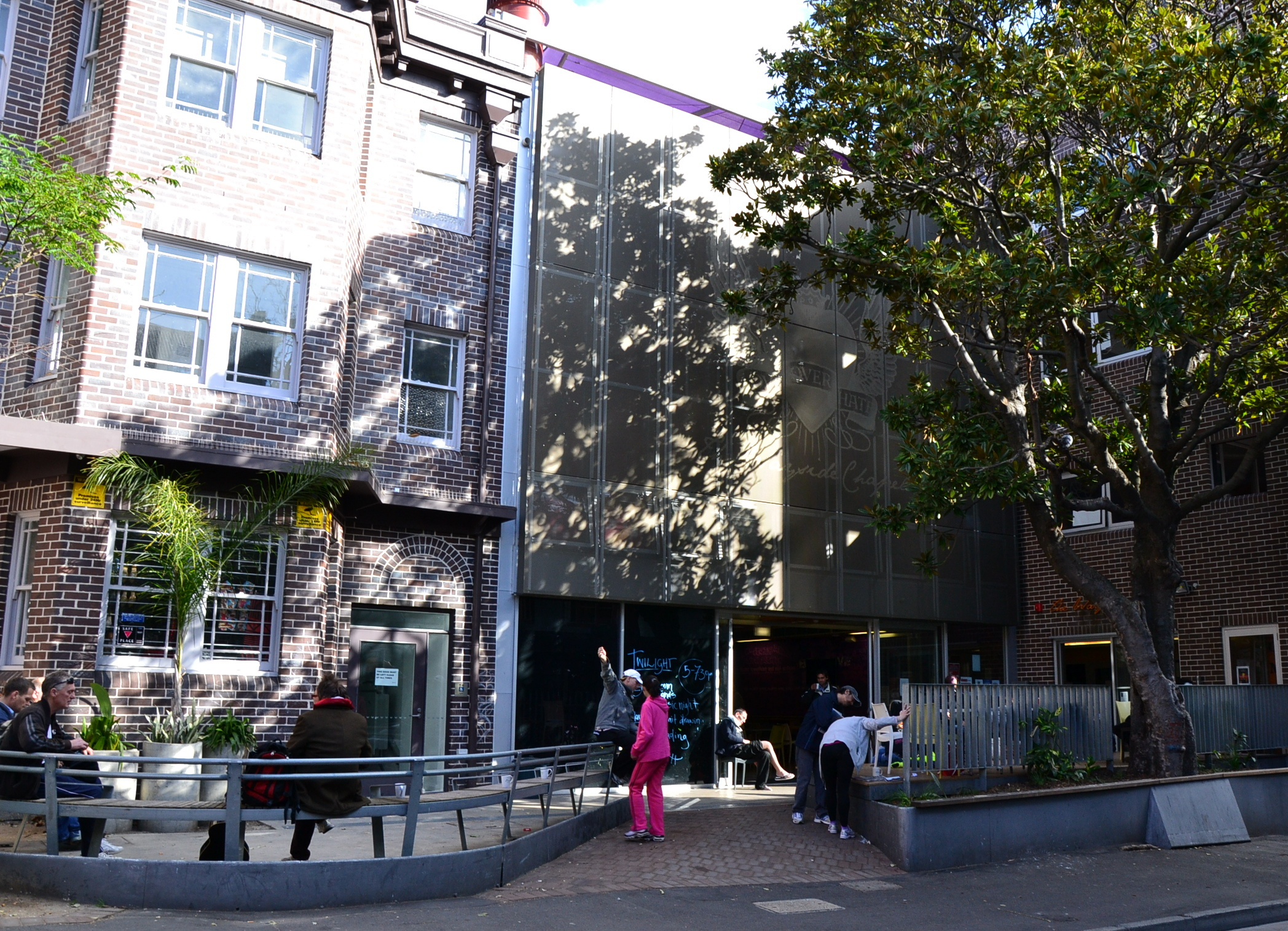

General information
- Location: 29 Hughes Street, Potts Point, Australia
- Coordinates: 33°52′18″S 151°13′28″E

The Wayside Chapel is a charity and parish mission of the Uniting Church in Australia in the Potts Point area of Sydney. Situated near Sydney's most prominent red-light district in Kings Cross, the Wayside Chapel offers programs and services which attempt to ensure access to health, welfare, social and recreation services. The centre assists homeless people and others on the margins of society.

== Description ==
The Wayside Chapel's mission is described as "creating a community with no 'us' and 'them'". Its motto, developed during the leadership of the Rev. Graham Long is "Love Over Hate".

Graham Long described the Wayside Chapel's approach in a 2014 interview as not having "any interest at all in solving problems". Rather, the Wayside Chapel characterises its approach in the following way:

"I don’t want you to be a problem that I have to fix. I want you to be a person that I can meet. And I think if we meet you’ll change and so will I. You’ll move towards health and so will I. That’s how it works."

== History ==
The Wayside Chapel was established in the Kings Cross area of Sydney in 1964. Ted Noffs was the founder of the Wayside Chapel, which was at the time a Methodist ministry (Uniting Church from 1977). At that time, it was only a single room with a dozen chairs in a block of flats at 29 Hughes Street, Potts Point. Within twelve months of his arrival, Noffs had transformed it into a chapel, coffee shop drop-in and community resource centre. The expectations of the church hierarchy—that Noffs's experiment would fail and become obscure and irrelevant—were not realised.

The centre grew until it occupied the entire building at No. 29. Later it grew still further and occupied the block of flats adjacent to the first block. A crisis centre was established in 1971 to handle crises which might arise at any time of day or night, including drug overdoses and possible suicides. More conventional church activities such as weddings were also carried out and the Wayside Chapel became one of the most popular wedding venues in Sydney, along with St Mark's Church, Darling Point.

On 22 October 1971 Aboriginal nurse and activist Isobelle Mary Ferguson (then McCallum) married her second husband, Francis George Kent, at the chapel.

In the late 1990s, Pastor Ray Richmond and others established a "tolerance room" where people who inject drugs were able to do so in a supervised environment, as an act of civil disobedience. This eventually led to the creation of the legal Medically Supervised Injecting Centre in Kings Cross.

=== New building ===
In July 2009, the Wayside Chapel received a grant of $2 million from the state government for the purpose of rebuilding its physical facilities. An additional grant from the federal government for $3 million was received in late 2009. The balance of funds were raised by private donation. Graham Long said that rainwater had been penetrating the brick walls and causing bricks to fall out. Forty per cent of the existing buildings had already been condemned, but moves were afoot to start a renovation and rebuilding worth $7.5 million.

On 19 May 2012 Wayside held the opening of its newly redeveloped building, designed by Environa Studio, the product of an A$8.2 million investment, five years of fundraising and 22 months of construction. The purpose-built facility features a community service centre, café, dedicated program space for The Aboriginal Project and Day-to-Day Living (a program for people with long-term mental health issues), community hall, offices and meeting spaces for groups such as Alcoholics Anonymous. The new building also includes a rooftop garden with over 50 varieties of vegetables, fruit, flowers and herbs, along with a bee hive, worm farm and compost.

== Governance and people ==
From 2004–2017 the pastor of Wayside Chapel was Graham Long. He was appointed a Member of the Order of Australia in the 2015 Queen's Birthday Honours in recognition of his community work.

As of 2025 the pastor and CEO of Wayside Chapel is Jon Owen, who has served in the position since July 2018.

== Service development ==
Ted Noffs intended the Wayside Chapel to be a place where action came before preaching and engagement with the community was more important than going to church on Sunday. Successive ministers have endeavoured to uphold this tradition. Noffs pioneered a number of far-reaching and innovative developments in social welfare at The Wayside Chapel:

- The Crisis Centre
- The Drug Referral Center
- Shepherd of the Streets (SOTS)
- Life Education Centre
- Relatives Against Intake of Narcotics (REIN)

Raymond Richmond was responsible for:

- Hands-On Health Centre (initiated by chiropractors in 1992, later closed down)
- Supervised Injecting Room

Graham Long attempted to develop the mission of "creating community with no 'us and them'". He described his approach as telling people they are not problems to be solved but rather people to be met. Under Long's leadership the following programs have been implemented:

- Aboriginal Project
- Day to Day Living Program (for people living with long-term and persistent mental health issues)
- Wayside Youth
- Community Development

== Current programs and services ==
- Community Service Centre: The CSC is the first point of contact for visitors and provides showers, clothing and emergency food for the most disadvantaged members of the community. The centre also helps those at their lowest ebb transition to better health and a better life through housing support, referrals to drug and alcohol rehabilitation and steps to manage mental health issues.
- Aboriginal Project: Providing a space for specialised, culturally sensitive support, the Aboriginal Project provides opportunities for community members to reconnect with their culture. The project also creates opportunities for leadership, mentoring and positive life choices for those visitors to Wayside who identify as Aboriginal or Torres Strait Islander.
- Wayside Youth: Supporting young people who are at risk, living on or around the streets of Kings Cross, Wayside Youth provides support through a drop-in centre and street-based youth work. It offers laundry and shower facilities, lounge room, kitchen, and activity areas.
- Day to Day Living: Day to Day living is a structured activity program for people experiencing long-term and persistent mental health issues. It aims to support people experiencing social isolation and to improve their independence in the community by teaching social skills, developing social networks and promoting confidence.
- Community Development: The Community Development Program is dedicated to creating opportunities for all members of the community to come together for activities and events to help reduce social isolation and promote togetherness.
- Wayside Cafe: The Wayside Café provides low-cost meals and beverages in a relaxed environment.
- Wayside Op Shop: There is an op shop attached to the chapel, and in September 2020, Wayside launched Wayside Online Op Shop.
