= Strangers in the Land (play) =

Anti-colonial play about British Malaya

- Original language: English
- Written by: Mona Brand
- Subject: Malayan Emergency
- Genre: drama

Premiere
- Date: November 1952
- Place: Unity Theatre, London

Strangers in the Land (1952) was a theatrical play written by Australian playwright Mona Brand, and first performed in Britain for the Unity Theatre. The play was a form of protest against the British occupation of during the Malayan Emergency, and heavily influenced by the Daily Worker's sympathetic coverage of the Malayan National Liberation Army (MNLA).

The play was first performed for two months at the Unity Theatre, beginning in November 1952.

== Background ==
Brand wrote the play in response to a BBC transmission about the Malayan Emergency along with the release of the film The Planter's Wife.

== Premise ==
The plot follows a woman called Christine who visits British Malaya to visit her fiancé, only to suffer a mental breakdown when learning of the atrocities committed by British forces. She then hears of atrocities committed against civilians by British forces, including the decapitation of heads, forced internment, restrictions on food, and the destruction of villages.

The entirety of the play takes place within the fiancé's house, with the story being told in the form of discussions and stories being shared in conversations between characters.

== Censorship by the Lord Chamberlain ==
In the UK during this time period the Lord Chamberlain, a title within the Royal Households of the United Kingdom, had the power to ban theatrical productions from commercial stages. However the Unity Theatre circumvented these restrictions to registered members of the theatre, therefore being classified as "private" showings and not commercial.

== Overseas performances and translations ==
Strangers in the Land was reproduced in the Australian cities of both Melbourne and Sydney in 1953 following Mona Brand's return to Australia.

The play was performed at the New Theatre in Sydney in 1953.

The play was also performed in the Soviet Union, Czechoslovakia, India, and East Germany.

It was translated into Chinese in 1957 and translated into both Latvian and Russian in 1961.
