= Aboriginal-Australian Fellowship =

Australian nonprofit organization

The Aboriginal-Australian Fellowship (AAF) was a Sydney-based organisation focused on changing the New South Wales Aborigines Protection Board, the wider issues of wage parity and full citizenship for Aboriginal Australians.

== History ==
The organisation was founded in 1956 by a group of Aboriginal (including Pearl Gibbs, Charles Leon, Ray Peckham, Herbert Stanley "Bert" Groves, Grace Bardsley, and Joyce Clague) and non-Aboriginal (Faith Bandler, Jack Horner, and Len Fox) social activists, with the intention of creating a partnership between Aboriginal and non-Aboriginal people to achieve social justice for Aboriginal people. They saw the need to educate non-Indigenous people about some of the injustices and discrimination suffered by Aboriginal people. Groves was the inaugural president of the association. Charlie Leon's wife Peggy was also a member of the executive.

Methodist minister John D. Jago was involved with the Fellowship.

Leon succeeded Groves as president, serving from 1958 to 1967, and in 1969.

=== Meetings and conferences ===
The first public meeting was held in Sydney Town Hall on 29 April 1957, where the AAF launched a petition drafted by Jessie Street, an Australian suffragette and committee member of the Anti-Slavery and Aborigines' Protection Society in London, calling on the federal government to change the Constitution to alter certain clauses in it which discriminated against Aboriginal people. A number of other organisations, including trades unions and the Union of Australian Women, affiliated themselves and helped to distribute the petition.

Delegates from the Aboriginal-Australian Fellowship attended the conference in Adelaide and joined the Federal Council for Aboriginal Advancement (FCAA) when it was founded in February 1958. It was one of the left-wing Aboriginal affiliates of the FCAA, who became the majority voting bloc in 1962 when the Northern Territory Council for Aboriginal Rights (NTCAR) joined in 1962. (The others were the Council for the Advancement of Aborigines and Torres Strait Islanders (Queensland) and the Council for Aboriginal Rights (Victoria)).

The AAF held its first New South Wales conference in October 1961, at which a resolution was passed calling for the repeal of the Aborigines Protection Act 1909 (NSW) and a campaign launched straight afterwards. The campaign included demonstrating at meetings of the major parties during the March 1962 New South Wales state election, and kept up the pressure afterwards, targeting the Labor premier Bob Heffron. In August 1962, Section 9 of the Aborigines Protection Act 1909 was repealed, allowing the consumption of liquor by Aboriginal people.

== Other activities ==
The Fellowship also lobbied for land rights reform, with Leon, who was also a member of the Aborigines Protection Board, developing a plan for the historically Aboriginal area of La Perouse (which was and is the longest-functioning Aboriginal community in Sydney, with Aboriginal people having lived there for thousands of years before colonisation began in 1788). The NSW Housing Commission eventually bowed to pressure and built suitable accommodation and a historical and cultural centre for the residents.

== Publications ==
The Aboriginal-Australian Fellowship issued a bulletin from 1960 to 1968, called Fellowship: Monthly Bulletin of the Aboriginal-Australian Fellowship.

== Dissolution ==
The organisation dissolved in 1969, as other, Aboriginal-run, organisations took over the work that it had been doing, including the Foundation for Aboriginal Affairs.
