= Aborigines Progressive Association =

Australian organisation

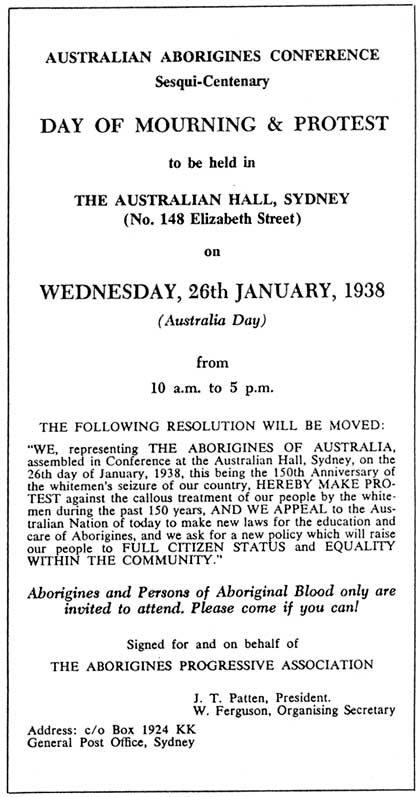
Proclamation of the Day of Mourning

The Aborigines Progressive Association (APA) was an Aboriginal Australian rights organisation in New South Wales that was founded and run by William Ferguson and Jack Patten from 1937 to 1944, and was then revived from 1963 until around 1970 by Herbert Groves.

== First incarnation ==
The Aborigines Progressive Association (APA) was established in 1937 by William Ferguson and Jack Patten in Dubbo, New South Wales. Ferguson led a group in the western part of the state, while Patten assembled an alliance of activists in the north-east. Both wings of the APA were involved in political organisation, rallies, and protests in both Aboriginal communities and reserves and major NSW centres such as Sydney. The Association was financed by the Sydney businessman William John Miles.

In 1938 the APA organised the Day of Mourning on Australia Day (26 January) of that year to protest the lack of basic human rights available to Aborigines. It was held at the Australian Hall, Sydney. The APA was joined by the Melbourne-based Australian Aborigines' League in staging the Day of Mourning to draw attention to the treatment of Aborigines and to demand full citizenship and equal rights. Ferguson, APA's organising secretary, said of the planned national day of mourning: "The aborigines do not want protection... We have been protected for 150 years, and look what has become of us. Scientists have studied us and written books about us as though we were some strange curiosities, but they have not prevented us from contracting tuberculosis and other diseases, which have wiped us out in thousands."

The APA was wound down in 1944.

== Second incarnation ==

The APA was revived in 1963 by Herbert Stanley "Bert" Groves, who had in 1956 co-founded the Aboriginal-Australian Fellowship (AAF) with Pearl Gibbs and others. (Note: Herbert Groves had in 1947 taken part in a May Day parade on the Australian Aboriginal League float, wearing his service uniform as a protest. Groves was one of three Aboriginal people who attended the FCAATSI conference in Adelaide in 1958, along with Doug Nicholls and Charles Perkins. His wife was called Renata.) Gibbs was also a co-founder of this APA, and other prominent people associated with it were Joyce Clague, Dulcie Flower, Harriet Ellis, Ray Peckham, Chicka Dixon and Ken Brindle.

Groves strongly believed that Aboriginal people should control this new incarnation of the APA.

From 1964 to 1970 the APA under Groves published a quarterly journal called Churinga as the official journal of the APA. (Note: See Churinga (Tjurunga) for the meaning of the word.) The journal, inspired by the 1938 journal Abo Call, was the inspiration for Churinga, aimed to inform non-Aboriginal people about issues such as Indigenous struggles for equal rights and land rights, as well as addressing the Aboriginal community in an effort to create solidarity and unity among the different groups. From December 1970 to February 1972 it was continued as Alchuringa, published by Kevin Gilbert's short-lived Aboriginal National Theatre Foundation.

Groves died on 28 December 1970, aged 63.

== See also ==
- Foundation for Aboriginal Affairs (1964–1977)
