= Faith Bandler =

Australian civil rights activist

Faith Bandler AC MBE
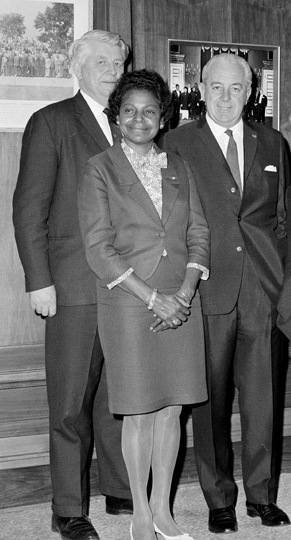
- Bandler meeting with Gordon Bryant (left) and Prime Minister Harold Holt in the lead-up to the 1967 referendum
- Born: Ida Lessing Faith Mussing; 27 September 1918; Tumbulgum, New South Wales, Australia
- Died: 13 February 2015 (aged 96)
- Spouse: Hans Bandler
- Children: Lilon Gretl Bandler, Peter Bandler
- Awards: Order of Australia (AC, AM)

Faith Bandler AC MBE (27 September 1918 – 13 February 2015; née Ida Lessing Faith Mussing) was an Australian civil rights activist of South Sea Islander and Scottish-Indian heritage. A campaigner for the rights of Indigenous Australians and South Sea Islanders, she was best known for her leadership in the campaign for the 1967 referendum on Indigenous Australians.

Bandler was awarded an honorary doctorate from Macquarie University in 1994, a Human Rights medal from the Human Rights and Equal Opportunity Commission, and was named one of the 100 inaugural Australian Living Treasures by the National Trust of Australia.

Following her death in 2015, the Prime Minister of Australia, Tony Abbott, offered her family a state funeral.

== Early life and family ==
Bandler was born in Tumbulgum, New South Wales, and raised on a farm near Murwillumbah. Her father Wacvie Mussingkon, son of Baddick and Lessing Mussingkon, had been blackbirded from Biap, on Ambrym Island, in what is now Vanuatu as a boy, aged about 13 years, in 1883. He was then sent to Mackay, Queensland, before being sent to work on a sugar cane plantation. He later escaped and married Bandler's mother, a Scottish–Indian woman from New South Wales.

Mussingkon's abduction was part of blackbirding, the practice which brought cheap labour to help establish the Australian sugar industry. He was later known as Peter Mussing, a lay preacher and worked on a banana plantation outside Murwillumbah. He died when Bandler was five years old. Bandler cited stories of her father's harsh experience as a slave labourer as a strong motivation for her activism.

In 1934, Bandler left school and moved to Sydney, where she worked as a dressmaker's apprentice.

== Career ==
=== Early career ===
During World War II, Bandler and her sister Kath served in the Australian Women's Land Army, working on fruit farms. Bandler and indigenous workers received less pay than white workers. After being discharged in 1945, she started to campaign for equal pay for indigenous workers. After the war, Bandler moved to the Kings Cross, Sydney, where she resumed her education and became involved in the peace movement, including through the Australian Peace Council. She also participated in the Margaret Walker Dance Group, which performed works addressing racial discrimination, and travelled to Berlin in 1951 to attend the International Youth Congress.

=== Community activism ===
In 1956, Bandler became a full-time activist, co-founding and becoming active in the Sydney-based Indigenous rights organisation Aboriginal-Australian Fellowship along with Pearl Gibbs, Bert Groves, and Grace Bardsley.

Bandler also became involved with the Federal Council for Aboriginal Advancement (FCAA, later FCAATSI), which was formed in 1957. During this period, Bandler worked with her mentors Pearl Gibbs and Jessie Street. As general secretary of FCAA, Bandler led the campaign for a constitutional referendum to remove discriminatory provisions from the Constitution of Australia. The campaign, which included several massive petitions and hundreds of public meetings arranged by Bandler, resulted in the 1967 referendum being put to the people by the Holt government. The referendum succeeded in all six states, attracting nearly 91 percent support across the country, which gave the Federal Government the power to make laws for Indigenous Australians in states, as well as including them in population counts (the Australian census).

In 1975, Bandler visited Ambrym Island, where her father had been kidnapped 92 years before. Throughout the 1970s, Bandler was a prominent member of the Women's Electoral Lobby in New South Wales.

=== Writing ===
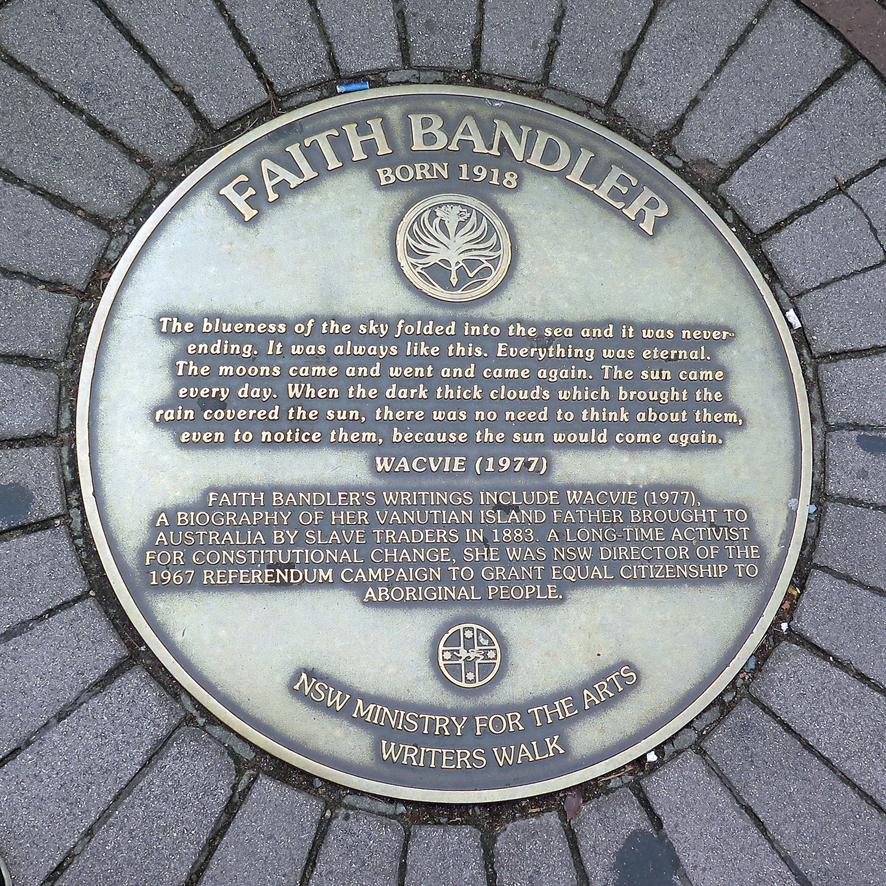
Faith Bandler memorial plaque in Sydney Writers Walk at Circular Quay

In 1974, Bandler started working on four books, two histories of the 1967 referendum, an account of her brother's life in New South Wales, and a novel about her father's experience of blackbirding in Queensland. Beginning in 1974, she also started campaigning for the rights of South Sea Islander Australians. According to Bandler's biographer, feminist writer and historian Marilyn Lake, this campaign was more challenging than the FCAATSI campaign for the 1967 referendum, since Bandler was fighting on two fronts. Not only was she battling historians who insisted that the blackbirded South Sea Islanders were actually voluntary indentured servants, but she was also to some extent ostracised by indigenous Australians in the Australian civil rights movement, due to the increasing influence of separatist Black Power ideology.

== Personal life ==
In 1952, Faith married Hans Bandler, a Jewish refugee from Vienna, Austria, and lived in Frenchs Forest. During the war, Hans had been interned in the Nazi labour camps.

The couple had a daughter, Lilon Gretl, born in 1954, and a fostered Aboriginal Australian son, Peter (Manual Armstrong). However, they lost touch with Peter when he later left to find his own family.

Hans died in 2009. Faith Bandler died at the age of 96 in February 2015.

== Honours and awards ==
Bandler was:

- appointed a Member of the Order of the British Empire (MBE) in 1976, but she declined to accept it
- appointed a Member of the Order of Australia (AM) on 11 June 1984, in recognition of her service to Aboriginal welfare
- awarded an honorary doctorate from Macquarie University in 1994
- awarded the 1997 Human Rights Medal by the then Human Rights and Equal Opportunity Commission
- named as one of the 100 inaugural Australian Living Treasures by the National Trust of Australia
- invested as a Companion of the Order of Australia (AC) on 26 January 2009 (Australia Day)
- inducted onto the Victorian Honour Roll of Women in 2001

A 1993 portrait of Bandler by artist Margaret Woodward is held by the State Library of New South Wales.

Following her death, Prime Minister Tony Abbott offered Bandler's family a state funeral.

== Selected works ==
Bandler's published works include:

- Bandler, Faith (1977). Wacvie. Adelaide: Rigby. ISBN 0-7270-0446-8.
- Bandler, Faith; Fox, Len (1980). Marani in Australia. Adelaide: Rigby. ISBN 0-7270-1254-1.
- Bandler, Faith; Fox, Len, eds. (1983). The Time was Ripe: A History of the Aboriginal-Australian Fellowship. Chippendale, New South Wales: Alternative Publishing Cooperative. ISBN 0-909188-78-5.
- Bandler, Faith (1984). Welou, My Brother. Glebe, New South Wales: Wild & Woolley. ISBN 0-909331-73-1.
- Bandler, Faith (1989). Turning the Tide: A Personal History of the Federal Council for the Advancement of Aborigines and Torres Strait Islanders. Canberra: Aboriginal Studies Press. ISBN 0-85575-196-7.
