= Pearl Gibbs =

Indigenous Australian activist (1901–1983)

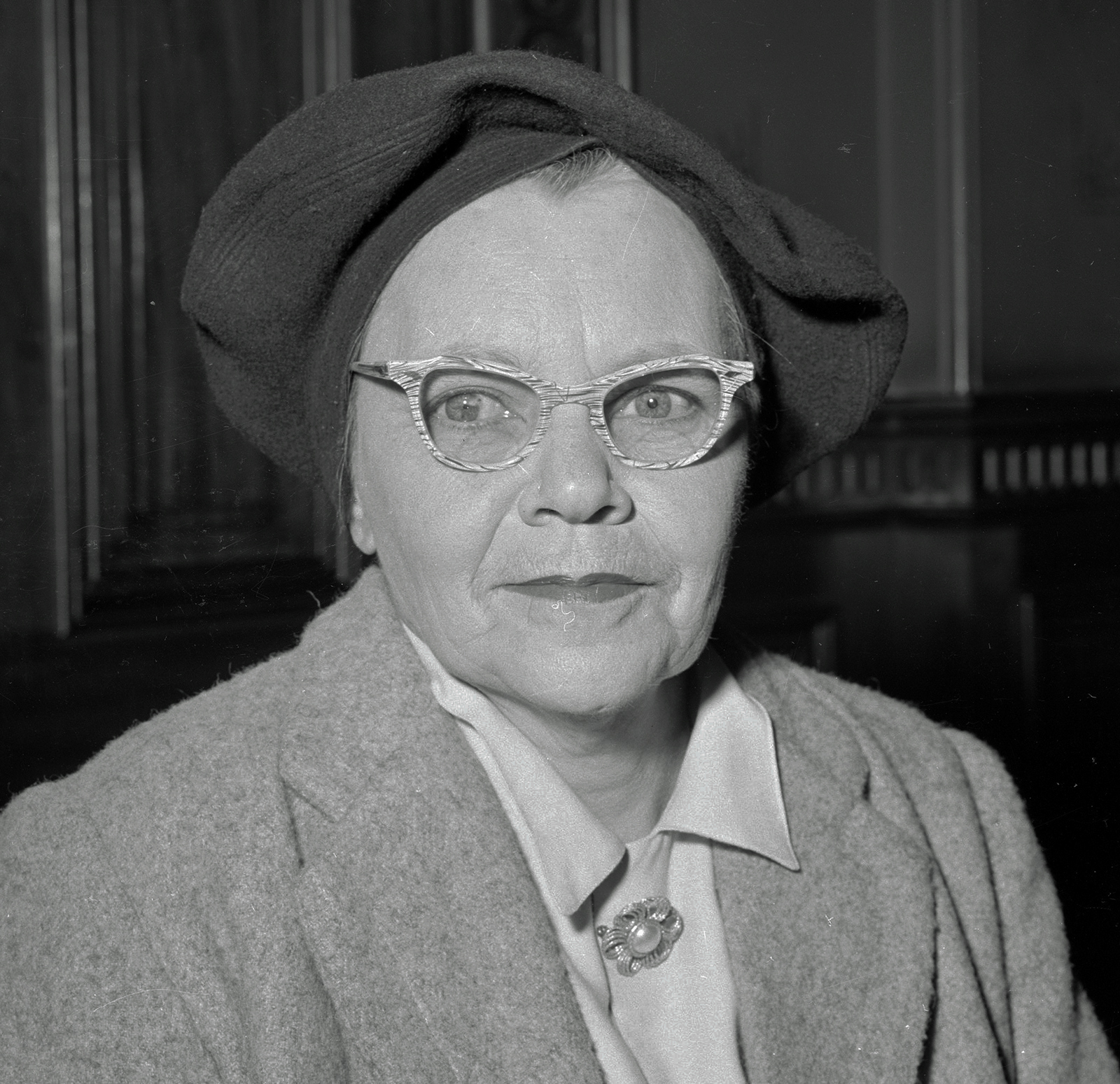
- Gibbs, from the collections of the State Library of New South Wales
- Born: Pearl Mary Brown; 18 July 1901; La Perouse, New South Wales, Australia
- Died: 28 April 1983 (aged 81); Dubbo, New South Wales, Australia
- Other name: Pearl Mary Gibbs (married name)
- Occupations: Aboriginal leader; Political activist; Social activist
- Organization: Aborigines Welfare Board (1954 - 1957)
- Spouse: Robert James Gibbs (m. 1923 Sep. ?)
- Awards: Victorian Honour Roll of Women

Pearl Mary Gibbs (née Brown) (18 July 1901 – 28 April 1983) was an Indigenous Australian activist, and the most prominent female activist within the Aboriginal movement in the early 20th century. She was a member of the Aborigines Progressive Association (APA), and was involved with various protest events such as the 1938 Day of Mourning. She has strong associations with activists Jessie Street and Faith Bandler.

Pearl married English naval steward Robert Gibbs in 1923 and had 2 sons and a daughter. The marriage broke down in the late 1920s and her husband took control of her children, later placing them in foster care.

== Early life ==
Gibbs was born Pearl Mary Brown on 18 July 1901 in La Perouse or possibly Botany Bay, Sydney, to Mary Margaret Brown, whose mother was an Aboriginal woman of the Ngemba people called Maria, and a white man, David Barry. Gibbs grew up in and around the town of Yass, where she attended Mount Carmel School along with her sister Olga.

In 1917, Gibbs and her sister moved to Sydney to work as domestics, and Gibbs found a position in Potts Point. Gibbs met other Aboriginal women and girls who were apprenticed as domestics by the Aborigines Protection Board and helped them make representations to the Board about their working conditions.

She married Robert James Gibbs, in April 1923, a British sailor, with whom she had a daughter and two sons; however, they later separated, and Gibbs cared for the children on her own.

== Activism ==
In the 1930s, Gibbs helped run a camp to support unemployed Aboriginal workers. She also spent time living at Salt Pan Creek camp in south-western Sydney. Refugee families from the north and south coast and Cummeragunja lived there, including Bill Onus, Jack Patten, and Jack Campbell. In 1933 she organised a strike for Aboriginal pea-pickers. She was one of the first members of the APA, and attracted large crowds when she gave speeches in The Domain in Sydney. She began to work with APA president Jack Patten and secretary William Ferguson, and in 1938 she was involved with organising the Day of Mourning protests, which at the time was the most significant Aboriginal civil rights demonstration in Australia. She was a spokesperson for the Committee for Aboriginal Citizen Rights, the lobby group which was set up to carry on the work of the Day of Mourning Congress. Later in 1938 she succeeded Ferguson as secretary of the APA, and she held the position until 1940.

On 8 June 1941, Gibbs became the first Aboriginal woman to speak on Australian radio, with her broadcast airing on 2WL in Sydney and 2WL in Wollongong. Her speech was on Aboriginal civil rights, and carefully scripted so that it would be allowed on the air. Much of Gibbs' early work was done during a time when Aboriginal people were subject to controls on their movement, unless they had an exemption certificate from the relevant protection board. Police would also monitor all public civil rights demonstrations. In 1993, the Australian Security Intelligence Organisation (ASIO) released their file on Gibbs to the National Archives of Australia. The file included records of which political meetings Gibbs had attended, and clippings of newspaper articles in which she had been mentioned.

Gibbs spent much of her adult life in Dubbo. In 1946, she and Ferguson established a branch of the Australian Aborigines' League in Dubbo, and she was the vice-president and later secretary of the branch throughout the 1940s and 1950s. Later, in 1960, Gibbs set up a hostel to care for the families of Aboriginal hospital patients in Dubbo. From 1954 to 1957, Gibbs was the only Aboriginal member of the New South Wales Aborigines Welfare Board, and she was the only woman to ever serve on the board. In 1956 she was a co-founder, along with Faith Bandler, of the Aboriginal-Australian Fellowship (AAF), which was a mainly urban organisation designed to facilitate cooperation between Aboriginal political groups and white people sympathetic to the cause. Gibbs was able to use the AAF to develop connections with the trade union movement in New South Wales.

Gibbs continued to be politically active throughout the 1970s, including supporting the establishment of the Aboriginal Tent Embassy. She forged important links between the Aboriginal movement and other progressive political groups, notably the women's movement.

Gibbs died in Dubbo in 1983, aged 81.

== Recognition ==
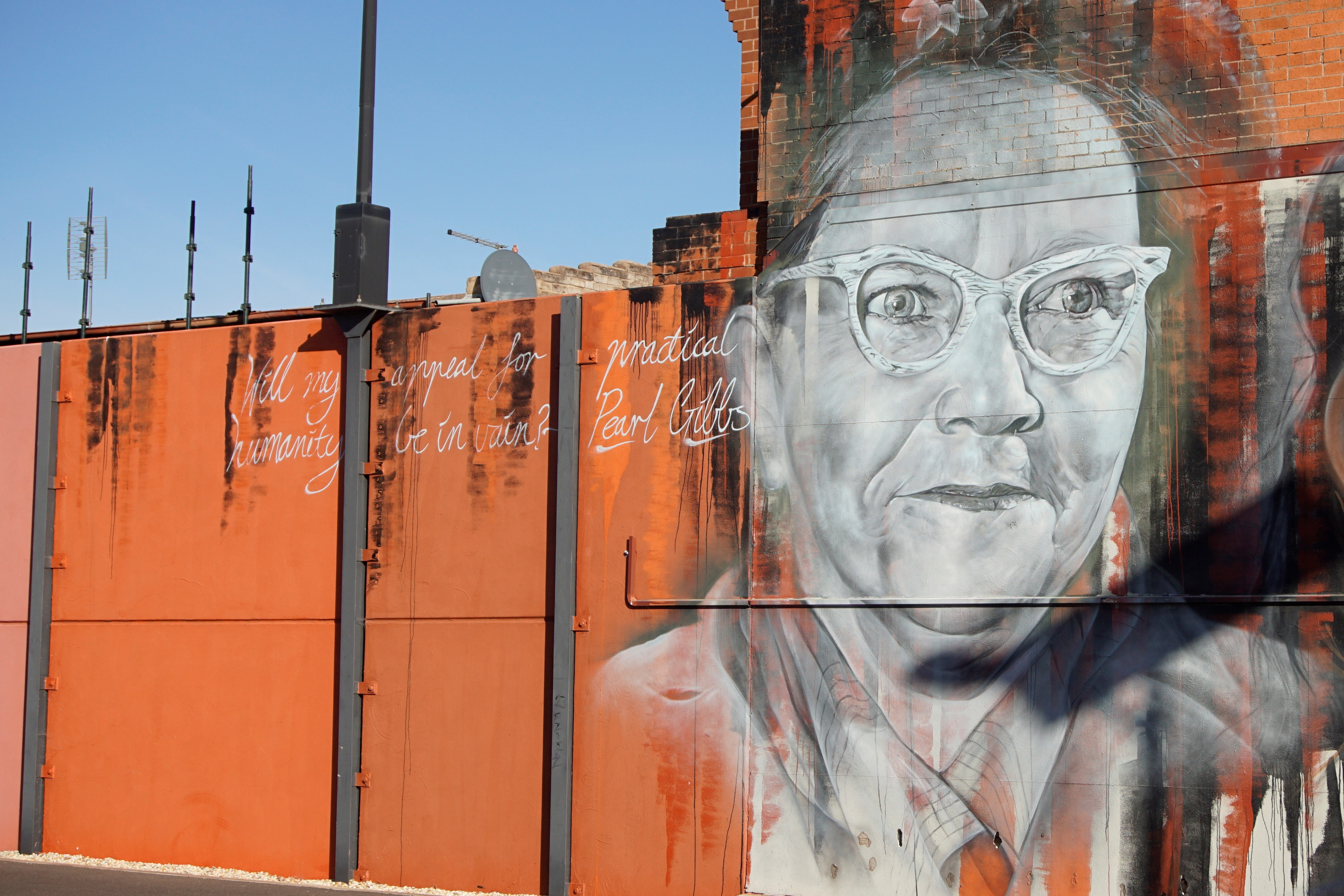
Pearl Gibbs mural, Dubbo

Gibbs was inducted onto the Victorian Honour Roll of Women in 2001.

On 18 July 2021, Google honoured her 120th birthday with a Google Doodle.

In November 2023, it was announced that Gibbs was one of eight women chosen to be commemorated in the second round of blue plaques sponsored by the Government of New South Wales alongside, among others, Kathleen Butler, godmother of Sydney Harbour Bridge; Emma Jane Callaghan, an Aboriginal midwife and activist; Susan Katherina Schardt; journalist Dorothy Drain; writer Charmian Clift; and charity worker Grace Emily Munro.

A 660-metre (2,170 ft) bridge in Dubbo is named in Gibbs's honour. The bridge is set to open late 2026.
