= William Ferguson (Australian Aboriginal leader) =

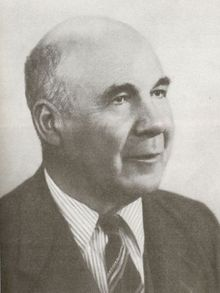
- Born: 24 July 1882; Darlington Point, New South Wales, Australia
- Died: 4 January 1950 (aged 67); Dubbo, New South Wales, Australia
- Occupation: Trade unionist
- Spouse: Margaret Gowans (m. 1911)

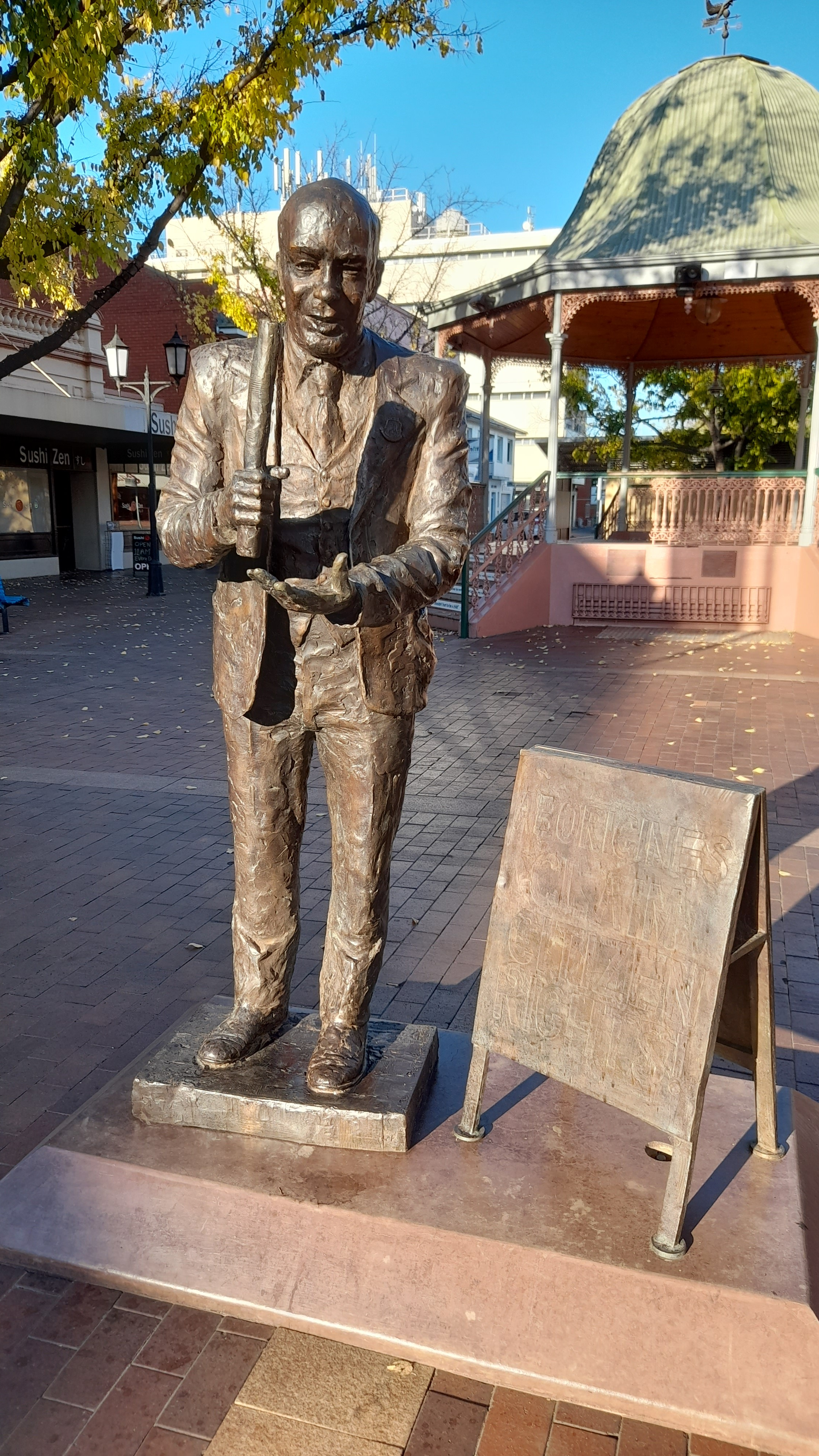
William "Bill" Ferguson, 2019 bronze statue, Dubbo NSW: sign "Aborigines Claim Citizen Rights!"

William Ferguson (24 July 1882 – 4 January 1950) was an Aboriginal Australian leader.

He was born at Darlington Point, Waddi, New South Wales, growing up near the Warengesda Mission near Cootamundra and, from 14 years after leaving school, worked with his father as a shearer, then labourer and mailman in the west of the State. His first political involvements were as an organiser of shearers for the Australian Workers' Union and then secretary of a local branch of the Australian Labor Party. From 1933 he lived at Dubbo with his wife, Margaret (née Gowans, also of Scot/Aboriginal heritage) and 12 children.

While he had lived outside of the system of "protection" of Aboriginal people, he was well aware of the conditions under which other Aboriginal people lived. From 1936, when parliament amended the Aborigines Protection Act 1909 to increase its powers to govern Aboriginal people's lives, he began speaking and lobbying for civil rights, that he later called "citizen rights". He launched the Aborigines Progressive Association (APA) at Dubbo in 1937 and was a witness before the NSW Legislative Assembly's select committee on the administration of the Aborigines Protection Act (which failed to initiate any reform).

With William Cooper and John Patten, he organised a Day of Mourning for Aboriginal people on Australia Day 1938. Aborigines Claim Citizen Rights! was the pamphlet that he wrote with Patten to promote their cause. He organised five APA conferences in country towns from 1938. He also was elected a member of the Aborigines Welfare Board, after the government responded to APA criticism by deciding to have two Aboriginal people on the board. While on the board he was shocked by the complaints received about conditions in Aboriginal reserves, and attempted to force some changes.

In 1949 he went to lobby the national Chifley government in Canberra as a representative of the Australian Aborigines' League, asking for many administrative reforms, which he had drafted. The Minister for the interior, Herbert Johnson, was unresponsive. Ferguson was furious, resigned from the Labor party, and stood as an Independent candidate for Parliament in the 10 December 1949 Australian federal election in his electorate of Lawson, but drew only a small number of votes.

He collapsed after a final speech before the election, and died of hypertensive heart failure on 4 January 1950 in Dubbo Base Hospital.

One of his daughters was nurse and activist Isobelle Mary Ferguson (1926–2019).
