= Sciberras =

Sciberras is a surname. Notable people with the surname include:

- Gareth Sciberras (born 1983), Maltese footballer
- Luke Sciberras, Australian painter
- Nicole Sciberras (born 2001), Maltese footballer
- Peter Sciberras, Australian film editor

== See also ==
- Sciberras Peninsula, the location of Malta's capital Valletta and its suburb Floriana
