= Fruit Bats (sculpture) =

Sculpture by Lin Onus

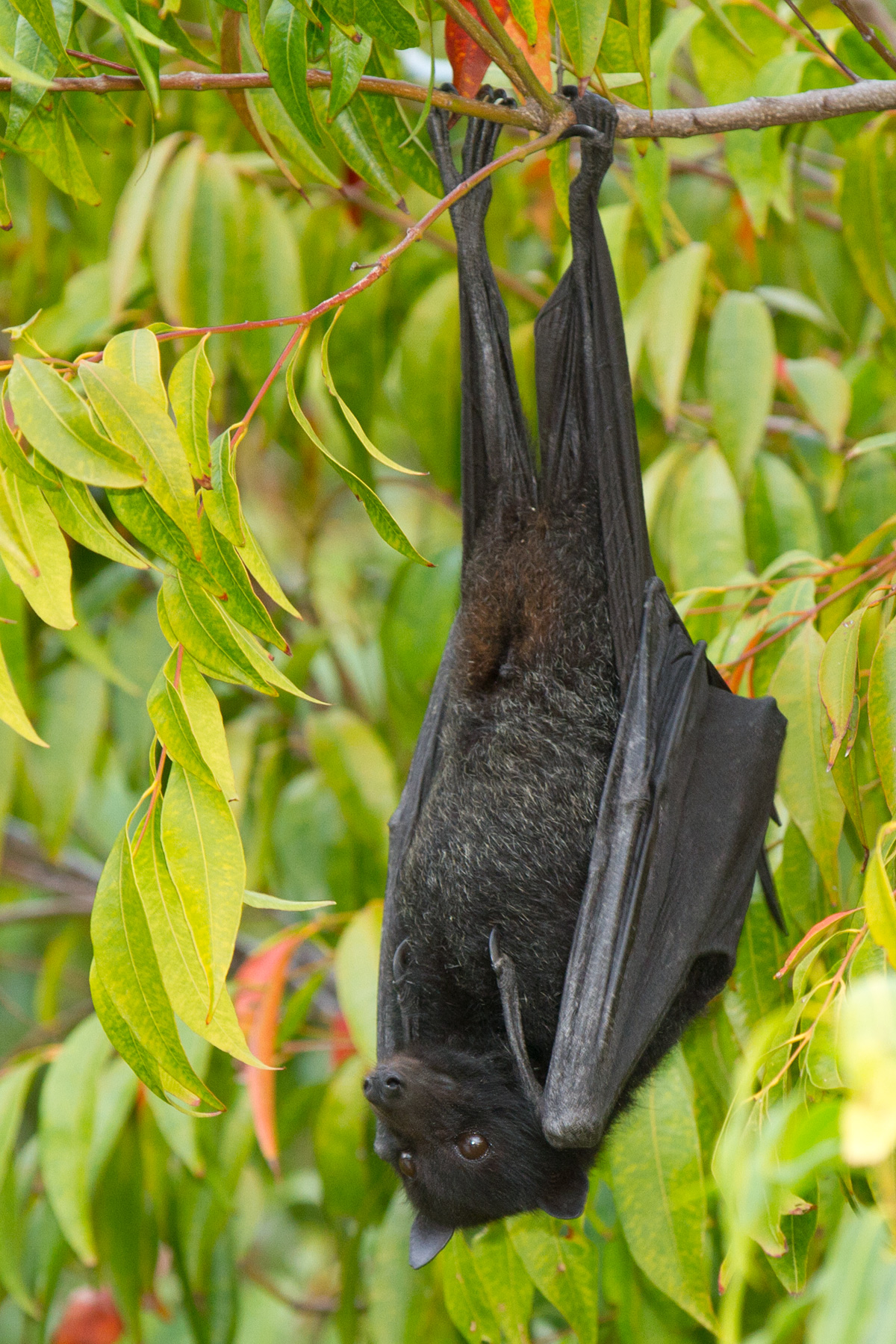
A black fruit bat hangs from a tree. The species is native to Arnhem Land.

Fruit Bats is a 1991 sculpture by Lin Onus, an Australian artist of Scottish-Aboriginal origins. The work is described by Terri Janke as "one of Australia’s most iconic contemporary Aboriginal works".

The work is made up of one hundred 16-inch fruit bat figurines, suspended from a Hills Hoist clothes line. The bats are painted with cross-hatching patterns, and below them sit disks decorated with flower imagery. The work's creation was informed by a series of trips Onus took to Arnhem Land and central Australia. After featuring in a series of exhibitions, it was acquired by the Art Gallery of New South Wales in 1993, who hold it today.

Critical attention has analysed the work's use of humour and the element of the Hills Hoist. Critics have offered varying interpretations, describing the work as an incursion on the space of white Australia, as a fusion of cultures, as an emphasis on the spiritual connection between Indigenous Australians and Country, or as a commentary on environmental degradation.

== Description ==
The sculpture consists of one hundred 16-inch fruit bat figurines, hanging from a Hills Hoist clothes line. The clothes line is painted red with ochre. The bats, made of fiberglass in a range of sizes, have black wings painted with cross-hatching, patterns known in Arnhem land as rarrk. Onus did not have heritage from the area, and to use the pattern he sought and received permission from Arnhem Land artists.

On the ground below the bats are small circles decorated with flower imagery, representing bat droppings and their role in plant propagation. Suspended, the bats sway slightly.

== Creation and exhibition ==
In 1986, Onus began a series of expeditions to Arnhem Land. He described these as "spiritual pilgrimages", and was accepted into the family of artist Jack Wunuwun. Informed by this and his trips through central Australia, Onus produced several works, including Fruit Bats.

Onus made the bats with the help of his son, and described the work's 1991 creation as "just for fun". In an interview in March 1991, he spoke of his fondness for fruit bats, and remarked of the medallions below the work: "You don't get bats without bat shits." It was originally installed in Gallery Gabrielle Pizzi, Melbourne, and was exhibited in the 1991 Australian Perspecta, as part of a curation by Victoria Lynn. The following year, Lynn again featured Fruit Bats in a curated exhibition. This was Strangers in Paradise, an exhibition put on by the Australian government at the National Museum of Modern and Contemporary Art in Seoul, Korea. Fruit Bats was popular with visitors, and Peter Collins, the minister responsible for the promotion lightly pressured the director of the Art Gallery of New South Wales (AGNSW) to acquire the work.

In 1993, the AGNSW acquired the work, and it was displayed the following year at the inaugural exhibition of the Yiribana Gallery, a space in the AGNSW dedicated to housing Indigenous Australian art. As of 2013, it was on almost permanently display, and was popular, particularly among children. By 2016, cracks had begun to appear on the sides of the bats, and Fruit Bats was withdrawn during display. Tests revealed the bats interiors were made of polyurethane ethers, and after restoration, plans were made to limit photodegredation by only displaying the work intermittently, under dim lighting. (Note: An extended account of the conservation process was given by conservation fellow Kelly McCauley on the AGNSW website.)

As of 2022, the installation was among the most popular works in the gallery. It has been cited by artists including Richard Bell, Luke Sciberras, and Deborah Kelly as among the key works in the AGNSW that influenced their artistic practice.

== Analysis ==
Humor was a theme that ran through Onus' work; in Fruit Bats, academic Ted Gott finds Onus at his "most wicked". This humour has been variously understood as satire on the social and political aspects of the housing of Indigenous people in urban areas, a reflection of Onus' proclivity for "whimsy", and an extra layer, applied to a work balancing contemporary and traditional Indigenous life.

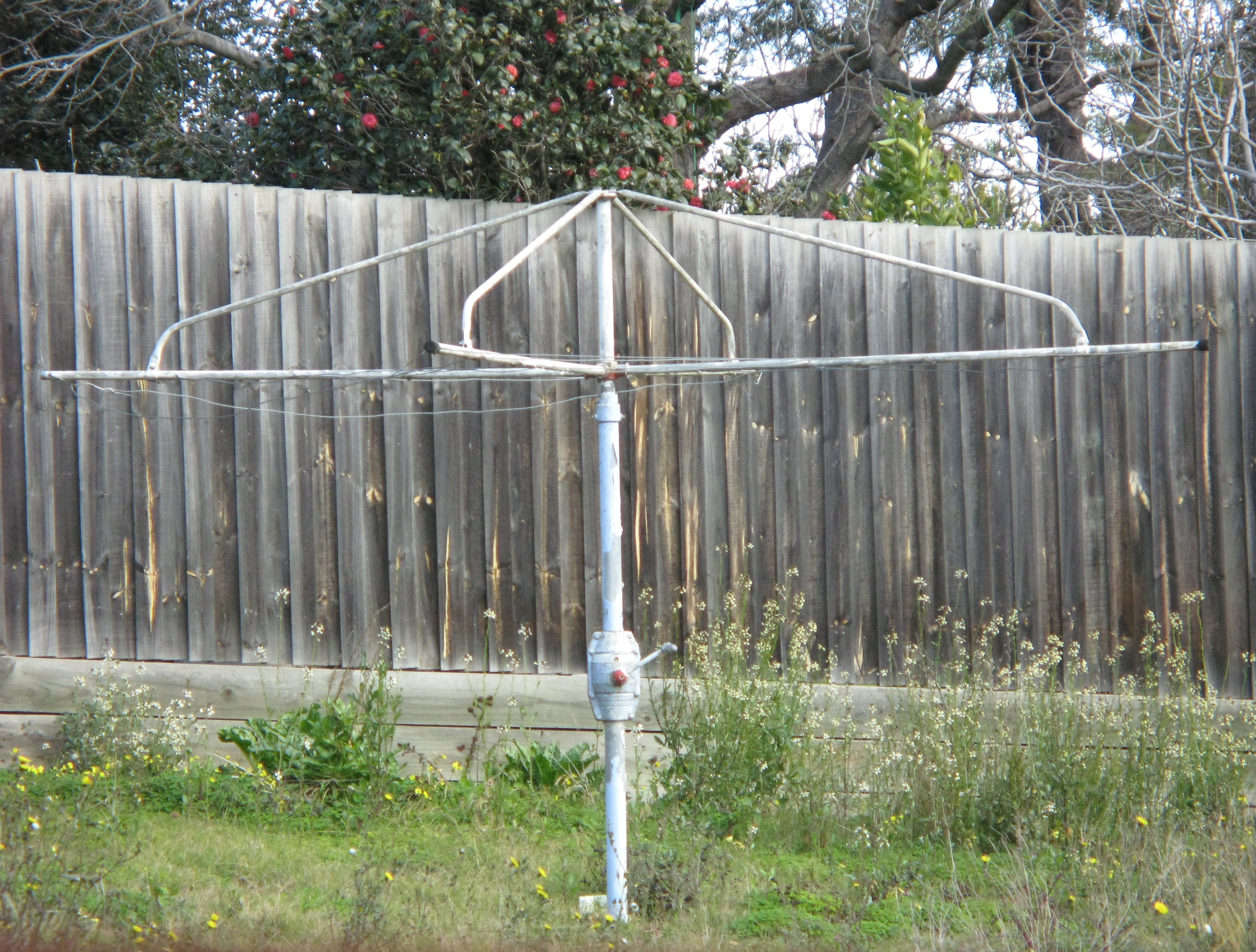
A Hills Hoist clothes line

Fruit Bats is based on cultural icons of the Hills Hoist clothes line as an icon of suburbia, and of fruit bats as pests. Through this, art historian Joan Kerr said, Onus created an icon which could persist into "the new millenium". By invoking the iconography of the Hills Hoist, according to curator Victoria Lynn, Onus was able to creation a fusion between cultures, "proposing the interconnected nature of their relationship." Art writer Traudi Allen sharply describes the clothes line as symbolising a "white Australian method of marking territory". Conversely, curator Michael O'Ferrall rejects a deeper meaning for the clothes line beyond something for Onus to hang bats on.

Curator Margo Neale characterizes the sculpture's prominent exhibition in AGNSW as making the space "Indigenised". Within the work she sees the same dynamic, as Onus takes the "Australian icon" of the Hills Hoist and appropriates it. By decorating the bats with raark, O'Ferrall says, Onus could provide a "layered allusion" to what he experienced as a deep connection to the landscape of Arnhem Land, both physically and spiritually.

For postcolonial author Bill Ashcroft, Onus' interaction with the clothes line is one of enshrinement, and by "enshrining the mundane, he demystifies the enshrined"—high art, and social attitudes towards kitsch and Indigenous art. Cara Pinchbeck, a curator AGNSW speculates the work may be commenting on Indigenous land rights or environmental degradation.

The depiction of the animals in a domestic setting is described by Mindy Perkins, writing for Stanford Arts, as raising questions among viewers as to the role of the bats, over whether they had "colonized new territory or merely reclaimed a home that was once theirs". Animals were a frequent theme in works towards the end of Onus' career, and several paintings after Fruit Bats again featured the bats. (Note: Onus died in 1996 at the age of 47.) Perkins describes the works personal appeal as coming from her position as an American, without the cultural familiarity possessed by Australians she imagines who may have seen such scenes in their day-to-day life: "beautiful precisely because it is neither spectacular nor familiar... [offering] a new perspective on what I might otherwise overlook."
