= Fort Saint Elmo =

Star fort in Valletta, Malta

- Forti Sant'Iermu
- Part of the fortifications of Valletta
- Valletta, Malta
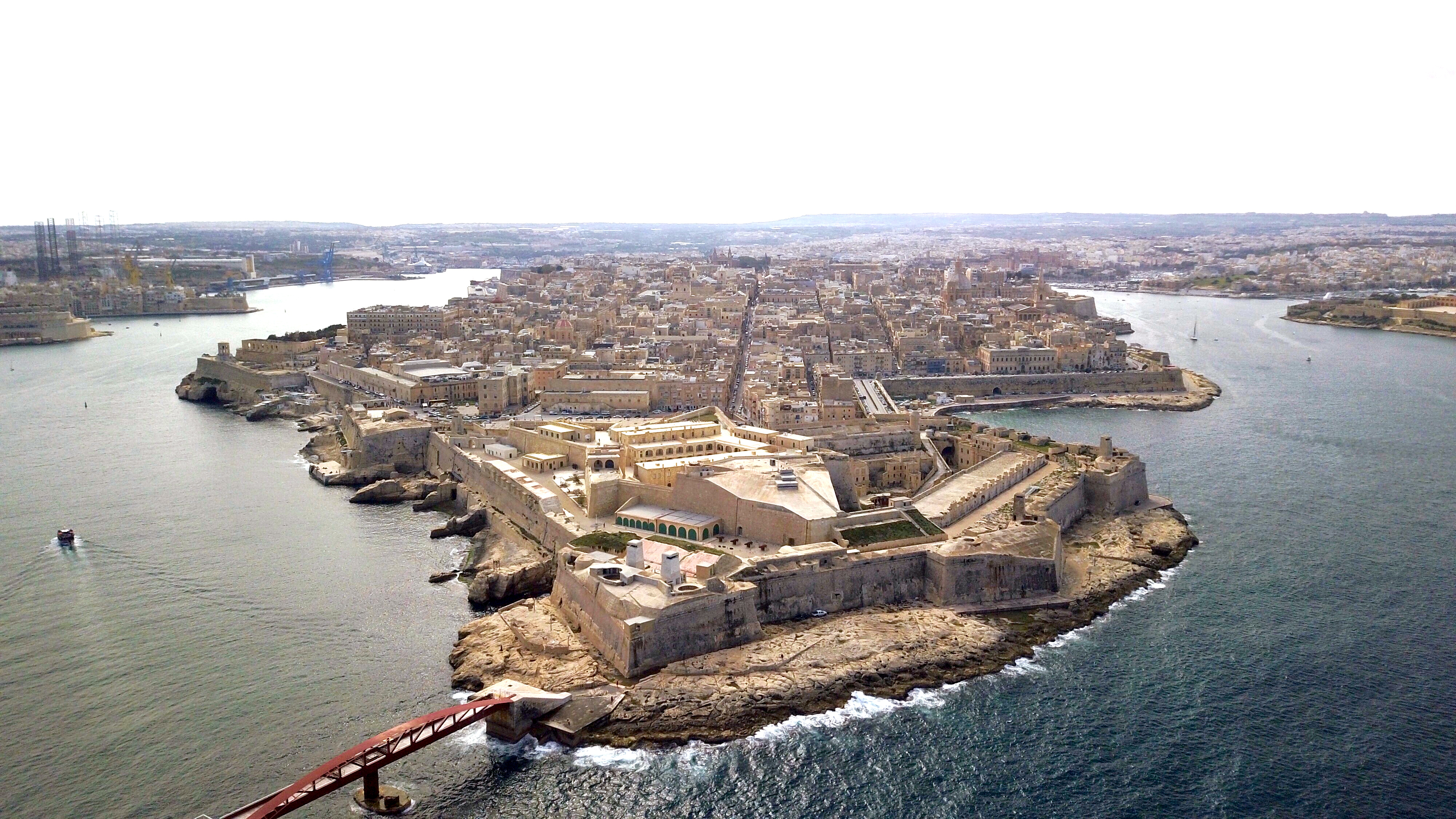
- Aerial view of Valletta, with Fort St. Elmo in the foreground

Site information
- Type: Star fort integrated into a city wall
- Owner: Government of Malta
- Controlled by: Heritage Malta; Police Academy
- Open to the public: Yes
- Condition: Intact

Location
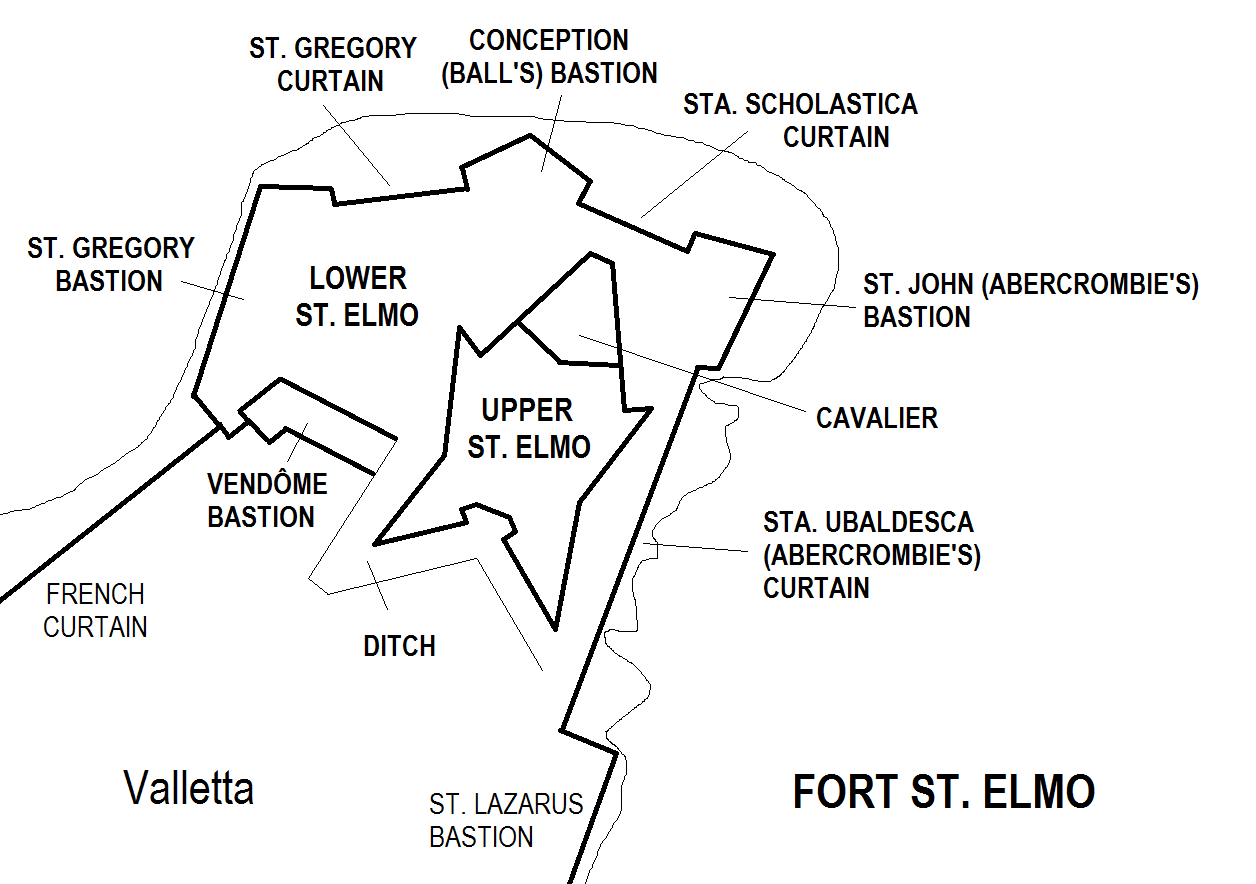
- Map of Fort St. Elmo
- Coordinates: 35°54′07″N 14°31′08″E
- Area: 50,400 m^{2} (543,000 sq ft)

Site history
- Built: 1552–1570s (Note: Modifications continued until the early twentieth century.)
- Built by: Order of Saint John
- In use: 1552–1972
- Materials: Limestone
- Battles/wars: Great Siege of Malta; World War II
- Events: Rising of the Priests

UNESCO World Heritage Site
- Type: Cultural
- Criteria: i, vi
- Designated: 1980 (4th session)
- Part of: City of Valletta
- Reference no.: 131
- Region: Europe and North America

Fort Saint Elmo (Maltese: Forti Sant'Iermu) is a star fort in Valletta, Malta. It stands on the seaward shore of the Sciberras Peninsula that divides Marsamxett Harbour from Grand Harbour, and commands the entrances to both harbours along with Fort Tigné and Fort Ricasoli. It is best known for its role in the Great Siege of Malta in 1565.

== History ==
=== Background and construction ===
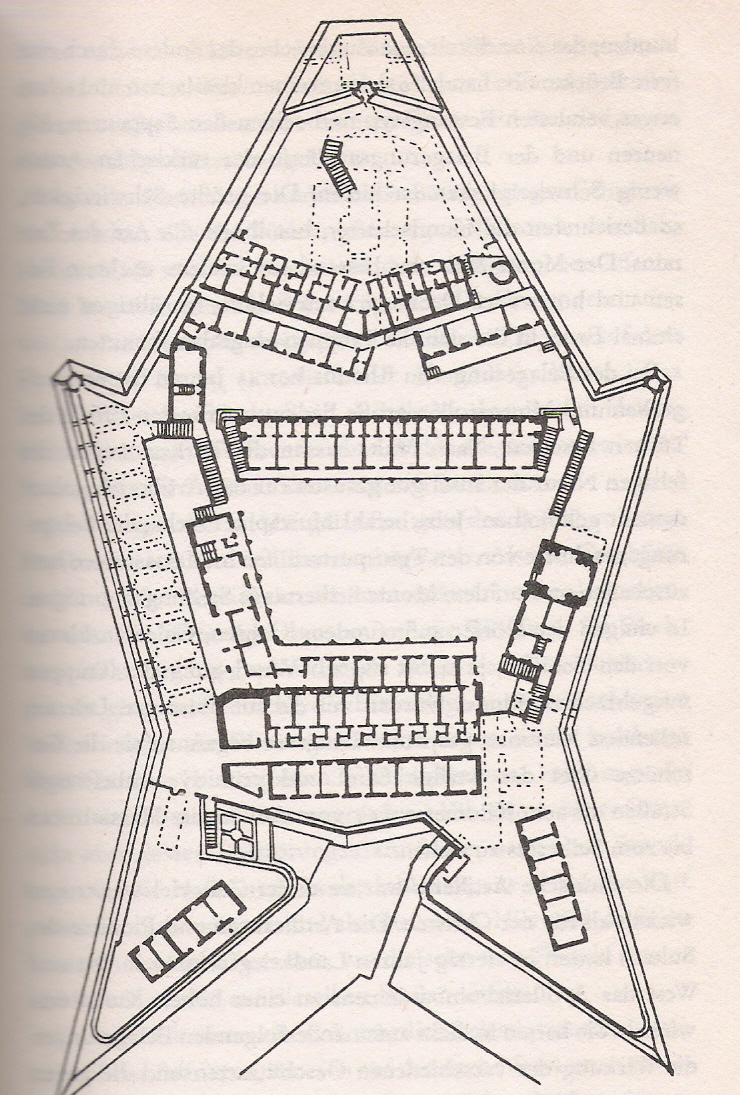
Plan of Fort Saint Elmo.

By 1417, the local militia had already established a permanent watch post on the tip of the Sciberras Peninsula. In 1488, the Aragonese built a watchtower on Saint Elmo Point, and it was dedicated to Erasmus of Formia, better known as Saint Elmo. In 1533, the Order of Saint John reinforced the tower due to its strategic location. In 1551, an Ottoman raid occurred in which the Turkish fleet sailed into Marsamxett Harbour unopposed. Due to this, it was decided that a major expansion was necessary, and in 1552 the tower was demolished and a new star fort began to be built. It was designed by a Spanish Engineer named Pietro Pardo. It had a cavalier, a covertway and a tenaille. A ravelin was hastily constructed months before the 1565 siege.

=== Great Siege of 1565 ===
In 1565, in the Great Siege of Malta, the Ottomans invaded Malta once again with much more force than in 1551. Fort Saint Elmo was the scene of some of the most intense fighting of this siege, and it held out for nearly a month, withstanding massive bombardment from Turkish cannon deployed on Mount Sciberras that overlooked the fort and from batteries on the north arm of Marsamextt Harbour, the present site of Fort Tigné. The initial garrison of the fort was around one hundred and fifty knights and six hundred soldiers, the majority of whom were Spanish, and sixty armed galley slaves. The garrison could be reinforced by boat from the forts across the Grand Harbour at Birgu and Senglea.

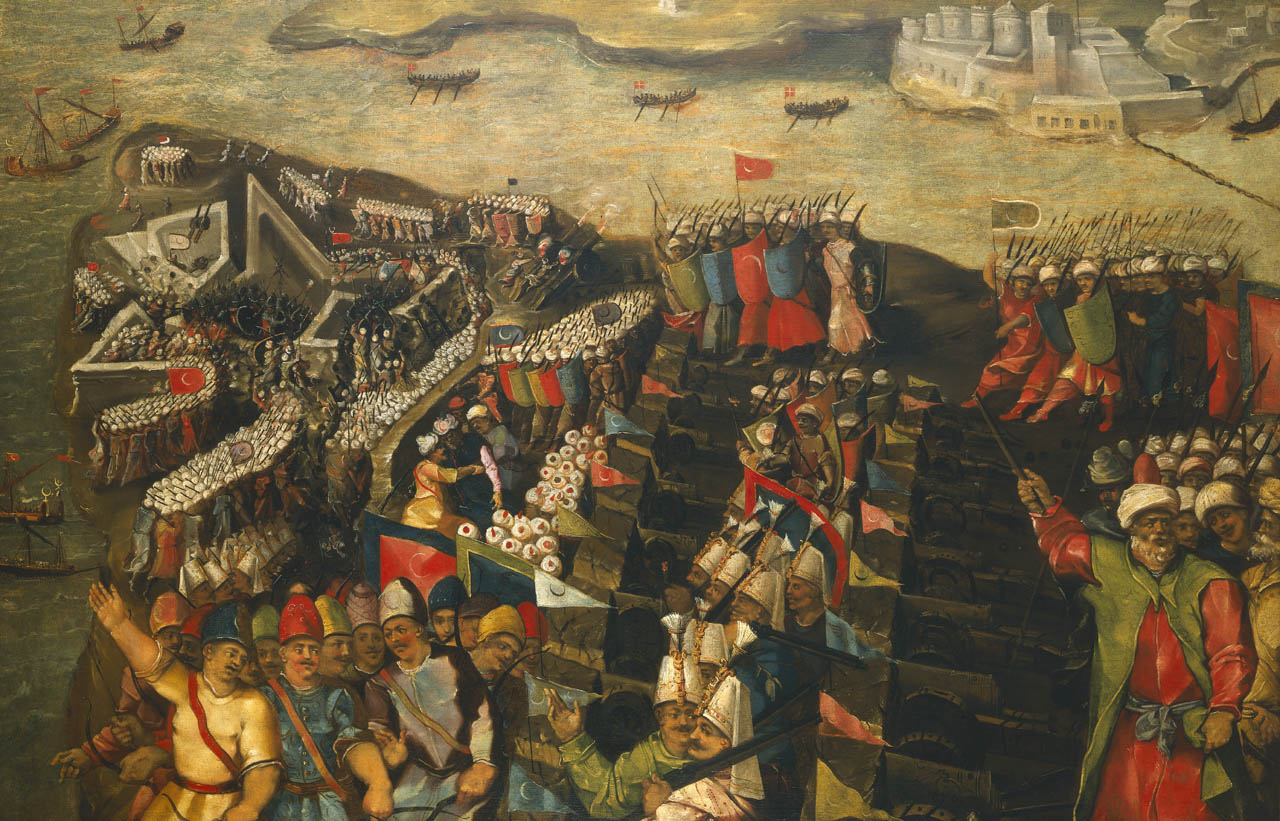
The Siege of Malta – Capture of Fort Saint Elmo by Matteo Perez d'Aleccio

During the bombardment of the fort, a cannon misfired and hit the top of its parapet, sending shards in all directions. Debris from the impact killed the gunner and mortally injured the corsair and Ottoman admiral Dragut, one of the most competent of the Ottoman commanders. The fort withstood the siege for 28 days, falling to the Turks on 23 June 1565. None of the defending knights survived, and only nine of the Maltese defenders survived by swimming across to Fort St. Angelo on the other side of the Grand Harbour after Fort St Elmo fell. The long siege bought much needed time for the preparation of the other two fortresses and the arrival of reinforcements from Spain.

=== Reconstruction and modifications ===
After the siege, Grandmaster Jean Parisot de Valette decided to build a new city on the peninsula. Construction started in 1566, and Francesco Laparelli was sent by the Pope to design the fortifications. The ruined Fort Saint Elmo was rebuilt and integrated within the city walls.

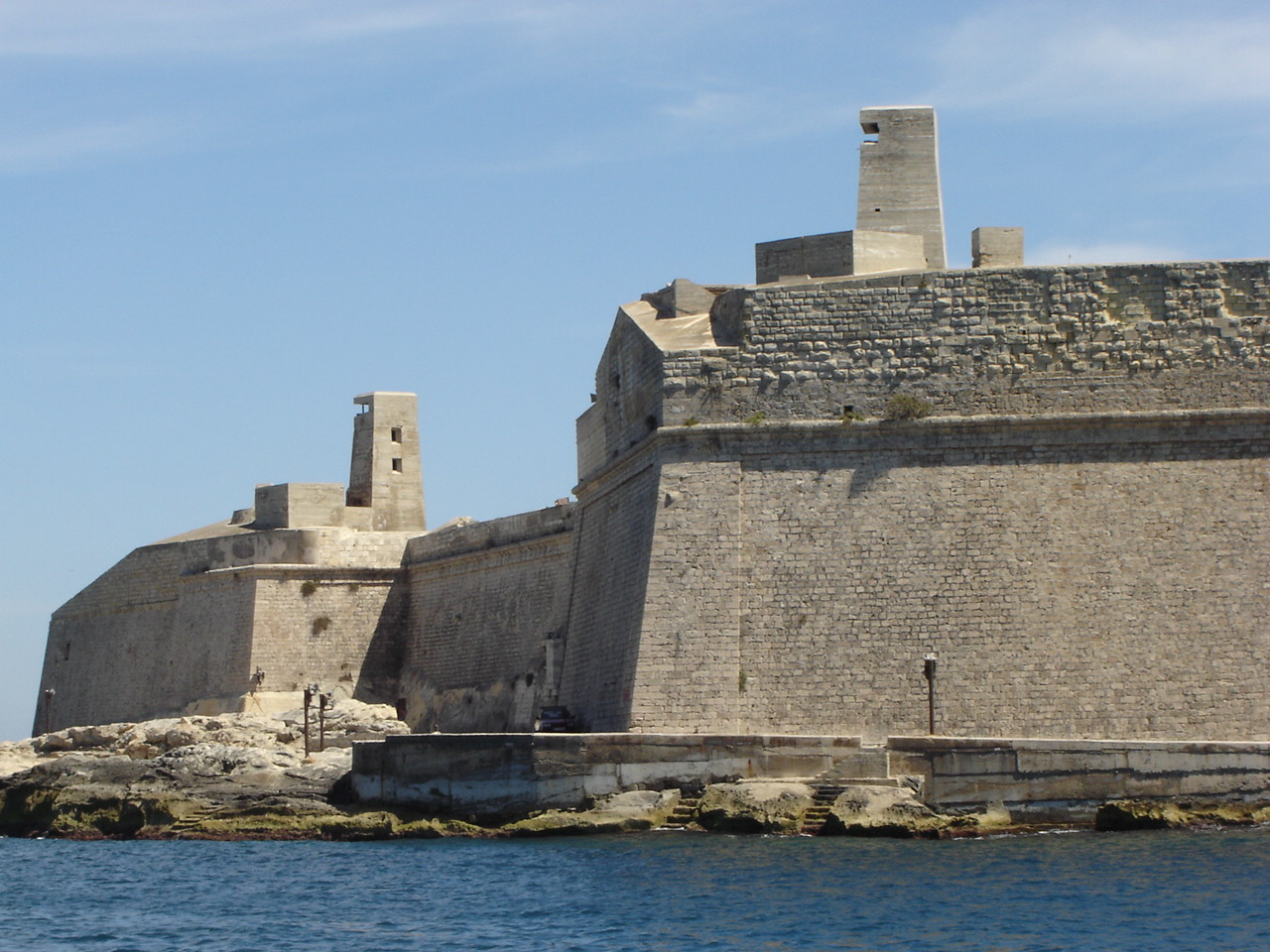
The Carafa Enceinte. The towers on top of the bastions are concrete coastal defences built in World War II.

The fort was modified a number of times in the 17th century. The Vendôme Bastion was built in 1614, and in 1687 the Carafa Enceinte was built on the foreshore surrounding the entire fort. In the late 17th century, the fort was directly linked to the cavalier and part of the ditch was filled in burying some of the original ramparts in the process. In the 18th century, a new polverista was built in the Vendome Bastion, and stores were built in the area between the main fort and the Carafa Enceinte. These are known as Pinto Stores and they and the surrounding area form what is known as Lower Saint Elmo.

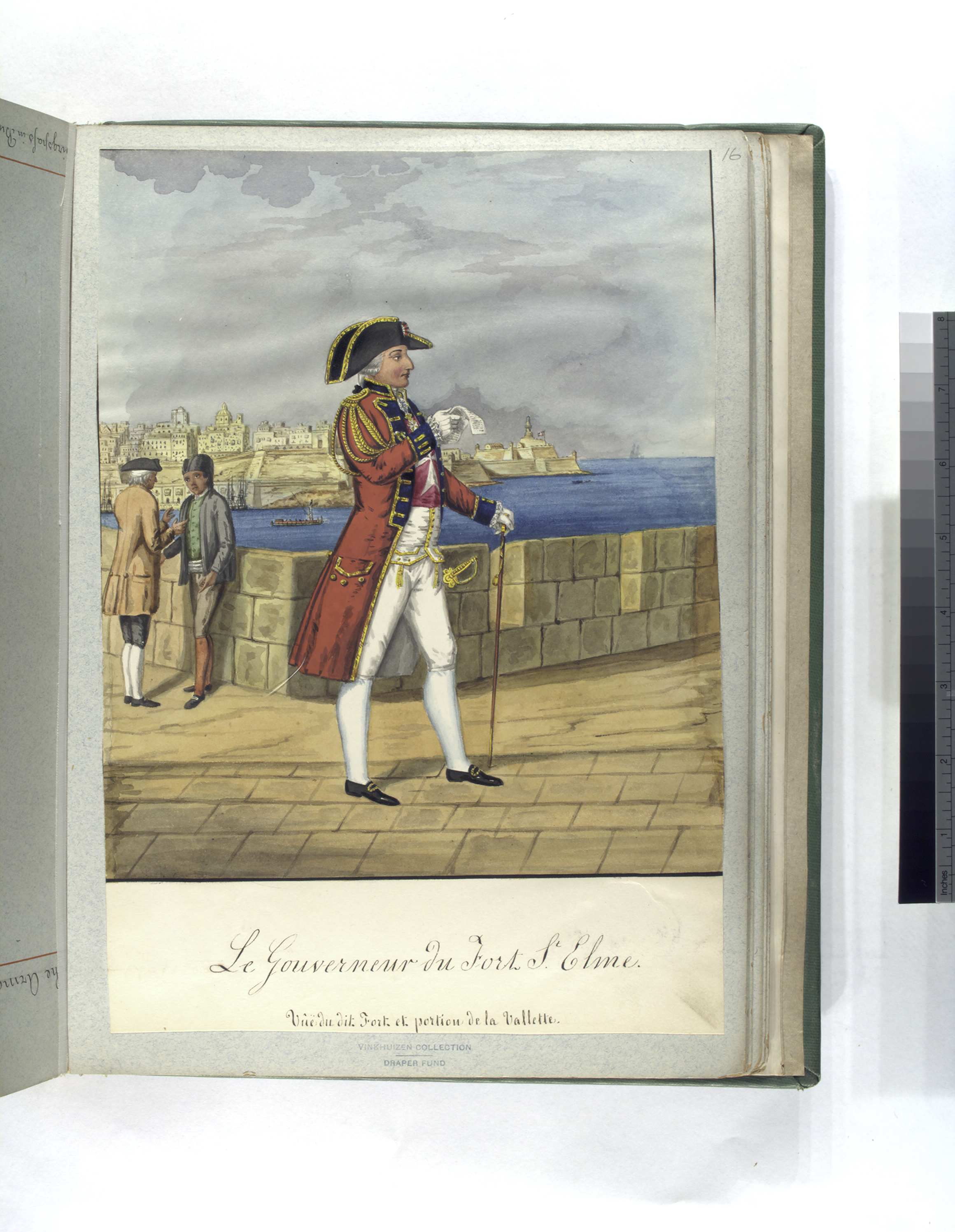
18th-century painting of the Hospitaller Governor of Fort St Elmo, with the fort itself and Valletta in the background

On 8 September 1775, Fort Saint Elmo was captured by 13 rebel priests along with Saint James Cavalier in what became known as the Revolt of the Priests. The Order's flag was lowered and a banner of Saint Paul was raised instead. The Order managed to recapture St Elmo so the rebels in control of St James surrendered as well. Eventually the rebels were tried and three were executed while the others were exiled or imprisoned. The heads of the three executed men were displayed on the corners of St James Cavalier but were removed soon after Emmanuel de Rohan-Polduc was elected Grandmaster in November of the same year.

=== British rule ===
The fort was once again modified in the early 19th century by the British, when a musketry parapet was built. In 1855, the polverista at Vendome Bastion was converted into an armoury, and some small arms from the Palace Armoury were transferred there. In the 1870s, more works were done on Abercrombie's Bastion. In 1917, the first heart operation to be performed on a soldier was done at St Elmo. In the interwar period gun emplacements were built to house new twin 6-pounder QF guns.

The fort was the site of the first aerial bombardment of Malta on 11 June 1940. Among the people who were in the fort during the air raid was the military doctor Ċensu Tabone, who later became President of Malta. He survived the attack, but six others were killed in the same air raid.

On 26 July 1941, the Italians launched a seaborne attack on the Grand Harbour with two human torpedoes, four MAS boats and six MT boats. The force was detected early on by a British radar facility, and the coastal artillery at Saint Elmo opened fire when the Italians approached to close range. Fifteen of the attackers were killed and 18 captured, and all the human torpedoes and MT boats, along with two of the MAS boats were lost. One of the MT boats hit St. Elmo Bridge, which linked the breakwater with the tip of the peninsula near the fort, and the bridge collapsed. The bridge was never restored, and it was only in 2012 that a new one was built in its place with a similar but different design.

Parts of the fort were severely damaged during the war and some scars of the bombing can still be seen to this day. The Royal Malta Artillery left the fort on 26 March 1972, ending its long military history. Parts of the fort subsequently fell in disuse.

=== Present day ===
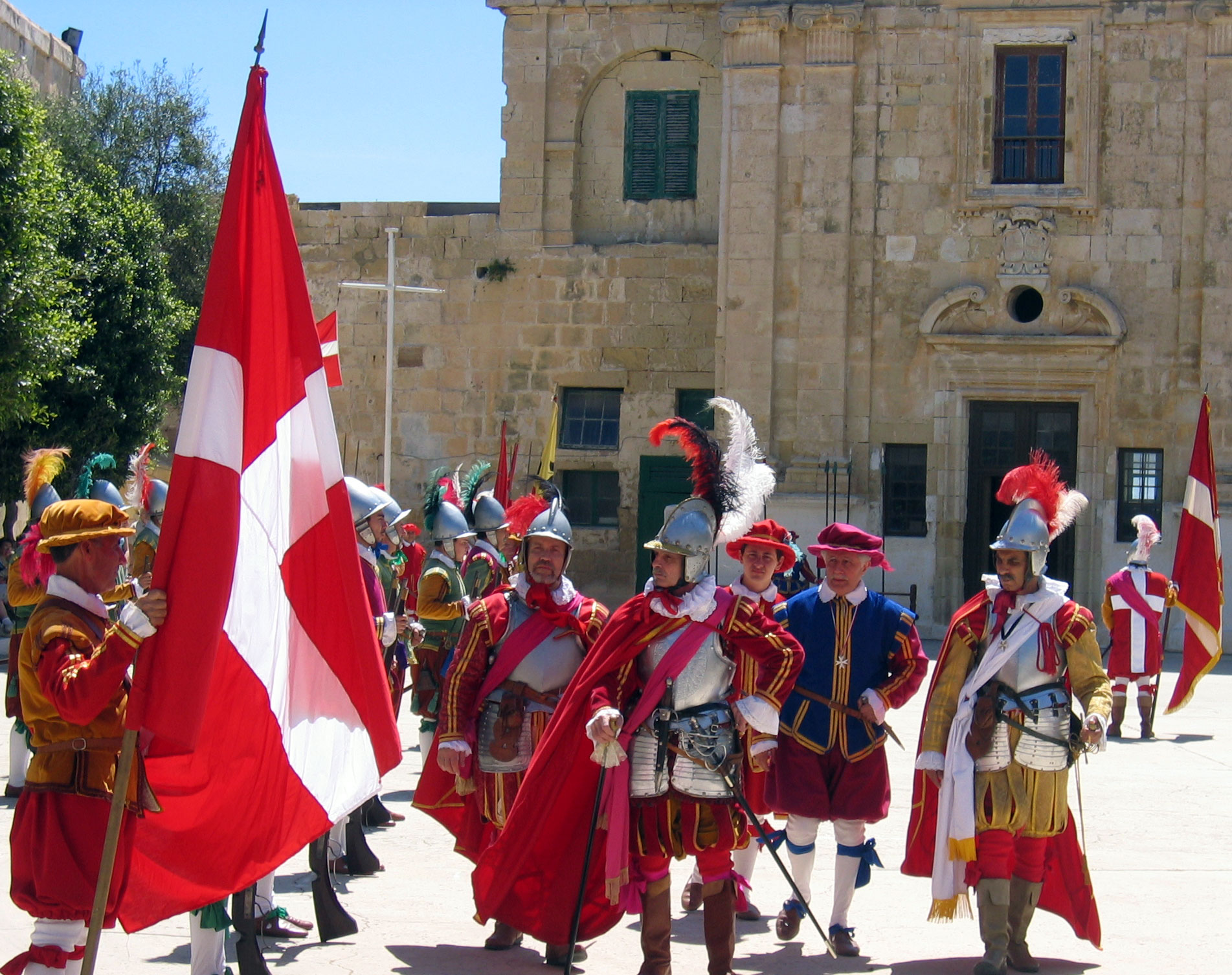
In Guardia parade at St Elmo

The World Monuments Fund placed the fort on its 2008 Watch List of the 100 Most Endangered Sites in the world because of its significant deterioration due to factors such as lack of maintenance and security, natural aging, and exposure to the elements. Since 2009 major restoration works began, and as of 2014 the restoration of Upper Saint Elmo and the Carafa enceinte was nearly complete. Restoration work was completed in 2015.

From 1975, part of the fort housed the National War Museum, which contained military equipment and other things related to World War I and II. A replica of the George Cross that was awarded to Malta by King George VI in April 1942, was also on display in this museum. The museum closed in September 2014, and reopened in May 2015 having a larger collection.

Since the mid-20th century, Fort Saint Elmo has also housed Malta's police academy. Other parts of the fort are used for In Guardia and Alarme military reenactments.

While the fort was being restored, some archaeological excavations were made and various elements of the original pre-1565 fort were uncovered. This was an important find because little of the original fort exists, mainly because Laparelli rebuilt it in 1566 and it underwent a lot of renovation between the 17th and 19th centuries.

In November 2015 the fort was used as a media centre for the Valletta Summit on Migration. Foreign journalists stated that it was possibly "the most stunning venue which ever hosted an EU summit".

==== Lower St. Elmo ====
Lower Saint Elmo was cleaned from the waste that accumulated over the years in 2015, but has since fallen back to disrepair and is essentially abandoned. Plans for restoration fell through multiple times.

== Layout ==
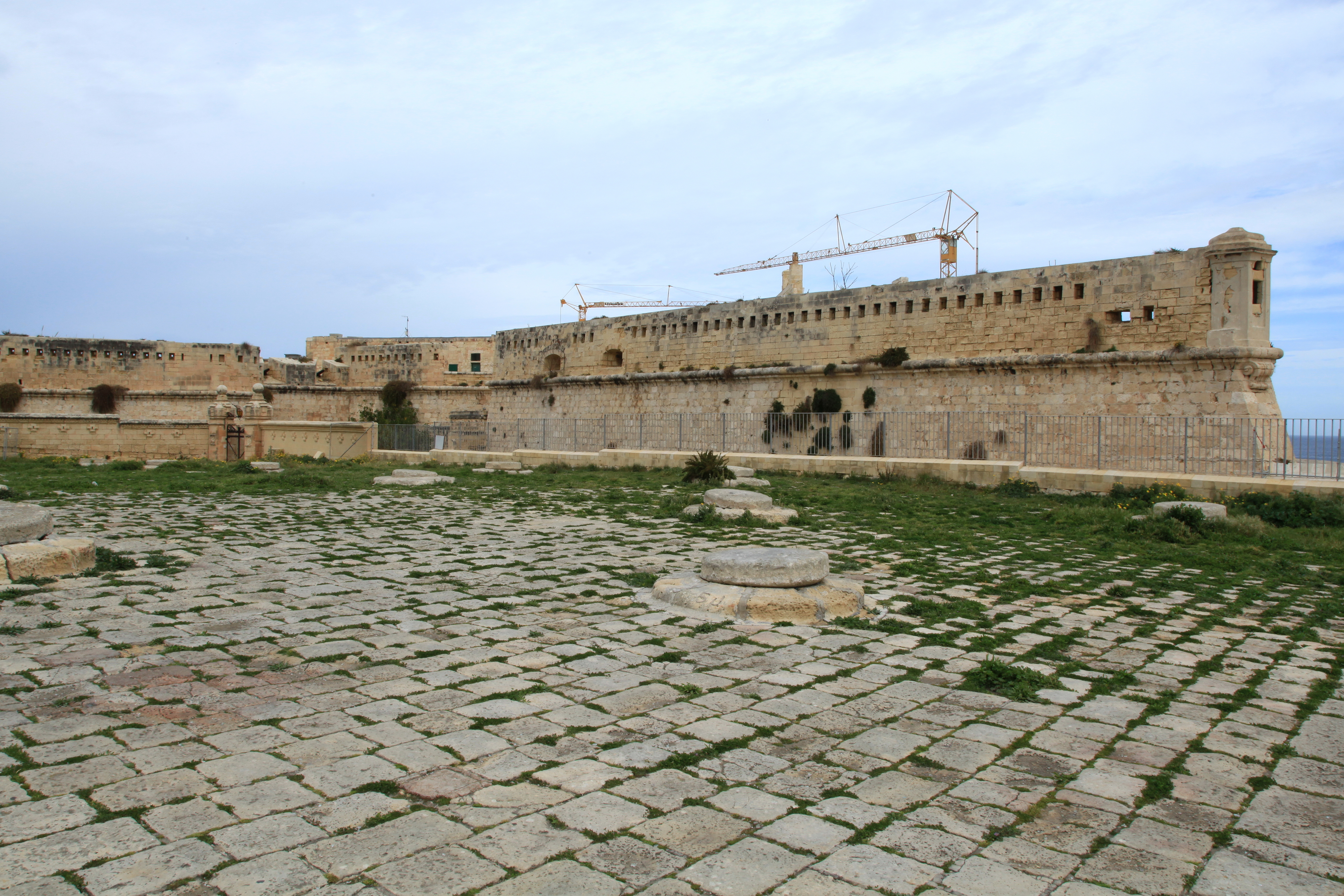
Left Demi-Bastion of Fort St. Elmo, before restoration

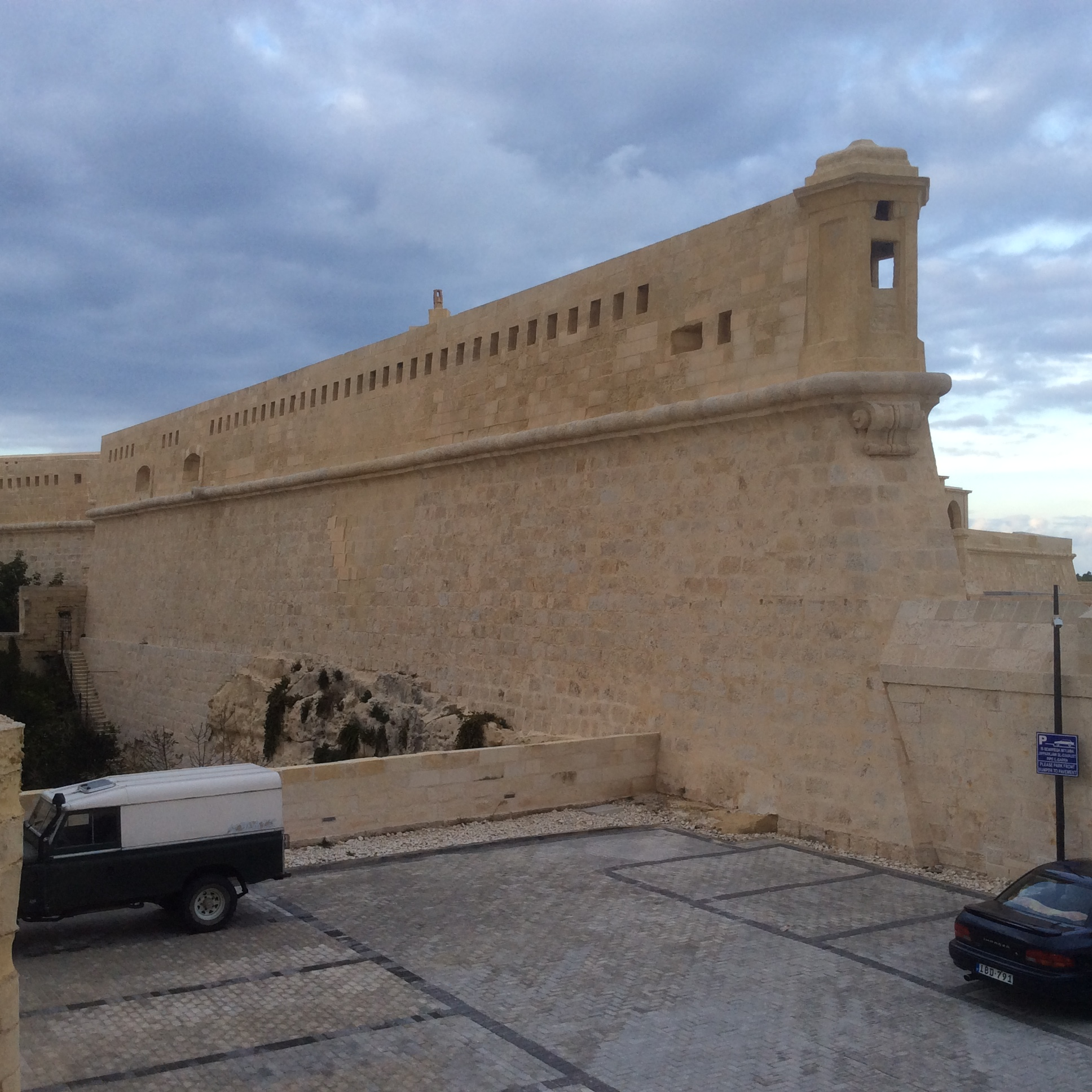
Fort St. Elmo after restoration

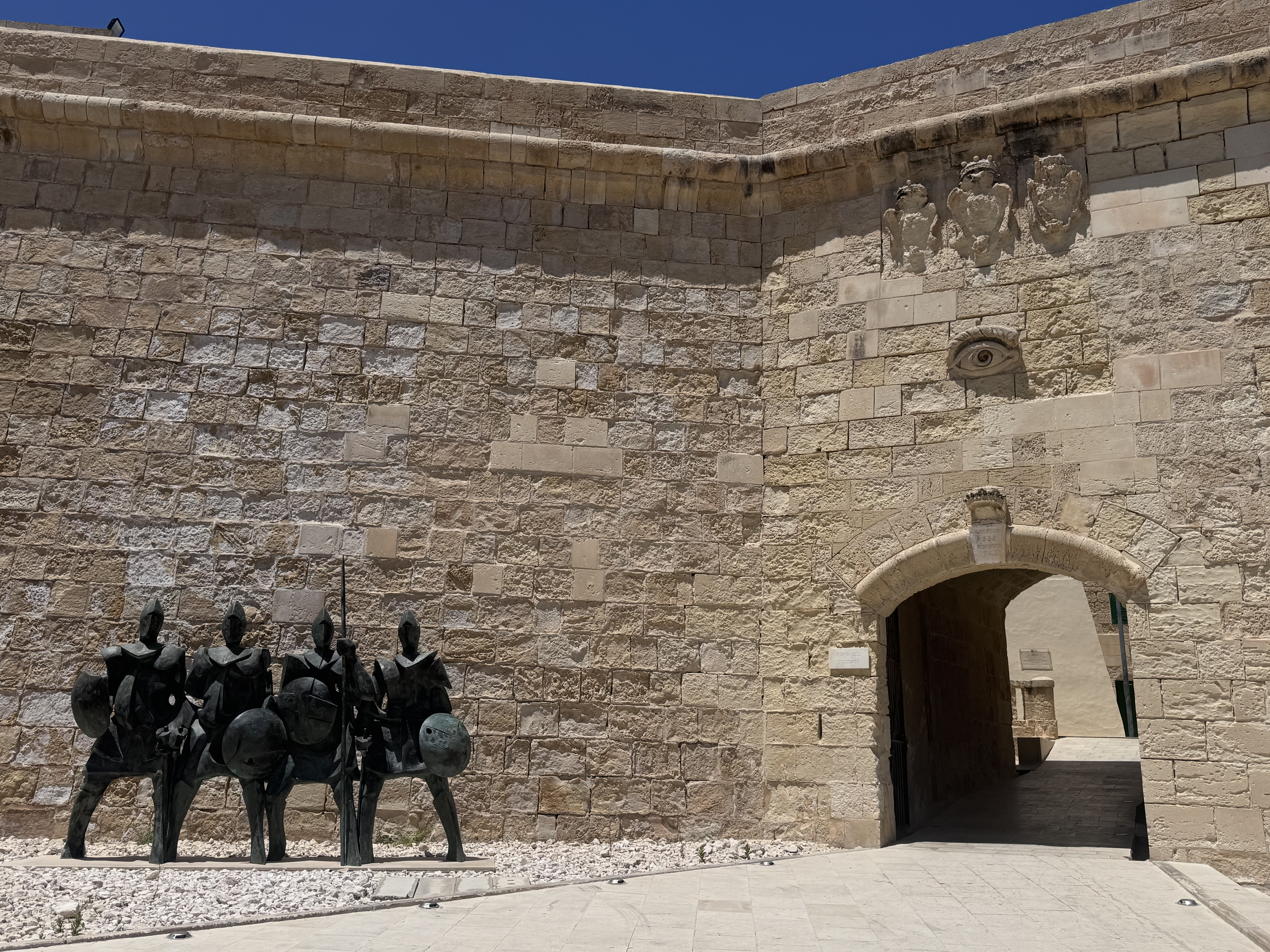
The Porta del Soccorso after restoration and inauguration as a museum

The original star fort, sometimes known as Upper St. Elmo to distinguish it from the rest of the fort, consists of two demi-bastions, two flanks and two faces, a parade ground, barracks and a large cavalier. The fort included a ravelin in 1565, but this was demolished during the fort's reconstruction after the siege.

The Main Entrance of Fort St.Elmo is known as the "Victoria Gate" and it is located at the bottom right corner of the fort. A gate known as the Porta del Soccorso serves as the main entrance to Upper St. Elmo. The 15th-century Chapel of St Anne is located within the fort's walls close to this gate, and the 18th-century Church of St Anne is found within the parade ground.

After the fortifications of Valletta were built, Vendôme Bastion was constructed in 1614 linking the French Curtain to Fort St. Elmo. The bastion contains an echaugette, and it was eventually converted into a magazine, and later an armoury. The bastion is now part of the National War Museum.

The Carafa Enceinte, which was built starting from 1687, encloses the original fort as well as Vendôme Bastion. It consists of the following bastions and curtain walls:

- St. Gregory Bastion – an asymmetrical bastion with a long left face. It was altered by the British to house QF 6 pounder 10 cwt guns.
- St. Gregory Curtain – a curtain wall linking St. Gregory and Conception Bastions. It contains various British gun emplacements.
- Conception Bastion, also known as Ball's Bastion – a small pentagonal bastion, containing a number of gun emplacements, magazines, and gun crew accommodation. Sir Alexander Ball was buried in the salient of the bastion.
- Sta. Scholastica Curtain – curtain wall linking Conception and St. John Bastions. It contains a gun emplacement for a RML 12.5 inch 38 ton gun, as well as other British modifications.
- St. John Bastion, also known as Abercrombie's Bastion – a large asymmetrical bastion at St. Elmo Point, the tip of the Sciberras Peninsula. The bastion contains several British gun emplacements and magazines. Sir Ralph Abercromby was buried on the bastion.
- St. Ubaldesca Curtain, also known as Abercrombie's Curtain – a long curtain wall linking St. John and St. Lazarus Bastions. It contains a number of British gun emplacements.

Some barrack blocks are located in the area between Upper St. Elmo and the Carafa Enceinte.

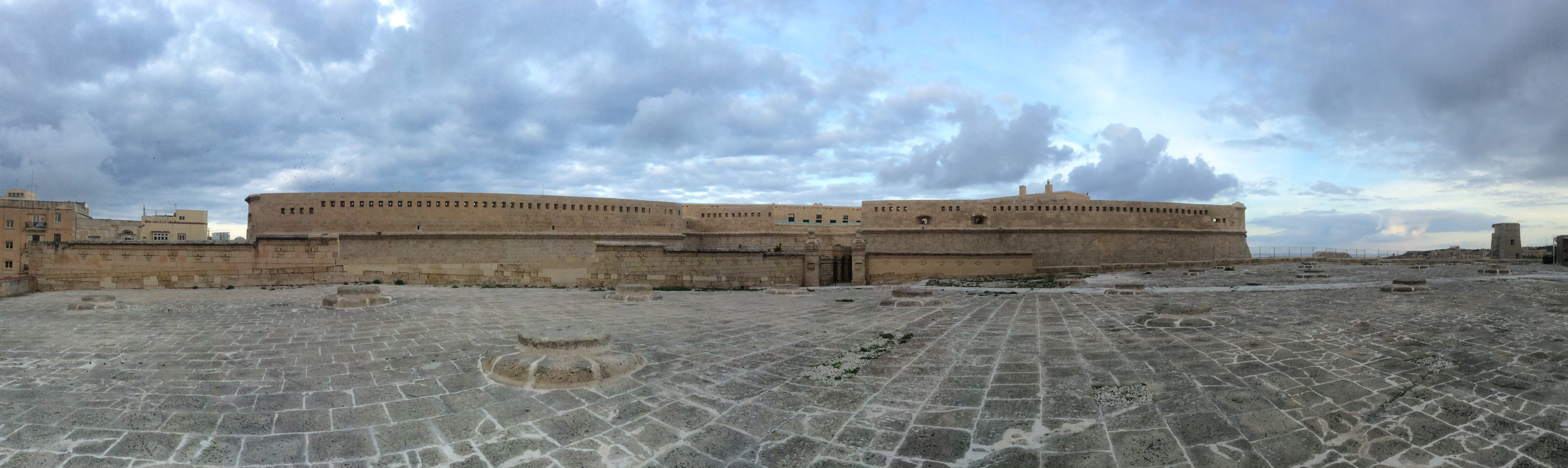
View of Fort St. Elmo

== In popular culture ==
- In the historical fiction novel The Religion, author Tim Willocks gives a fictionalized account of the battle for the fort (during the 1565 siege of Malta).
- Lower Saint Elmo was used as a film location for the Turkish jail in the 1978 film Midnight Express.
- The fort is mentioned in the 1980 thriller novel Man on Fire by A. J. Quinnell. The main character Creasy trained with the AFM inside the fort.
- Fort Saint Elmo was featured on Maltese stamps in 1980 and 2003, and on a UNESCO stamp in 1981.
- Popular Maltese folk band Etnika gave three concerts on 31 July, 1 and 2 August 2003 named Bumbum, that drew thousands of revellers to listen to modern Maltese folk music.
- In the popular real time strategy game released in 2005, Age of Empires III, the first level's task is to defend a fort on Malta against the Ottomans, which appears to be Fort St. Elmo.
- The first part of the music video of the 2008 song Vodka by the Gozitan singer Morena was filmed at Lower Saint Elmo (the same part of the fort that was used for Midnight Express).
- The fort plays a key role in the novel Sword and Scimitar by Simon Scarrow.
- The fort is used as an MI6 training facility in 007 First Light
