= Church of St Anne, Fort St Elmo =

Church of St Anne
- Knisja ta' Sant'Anna
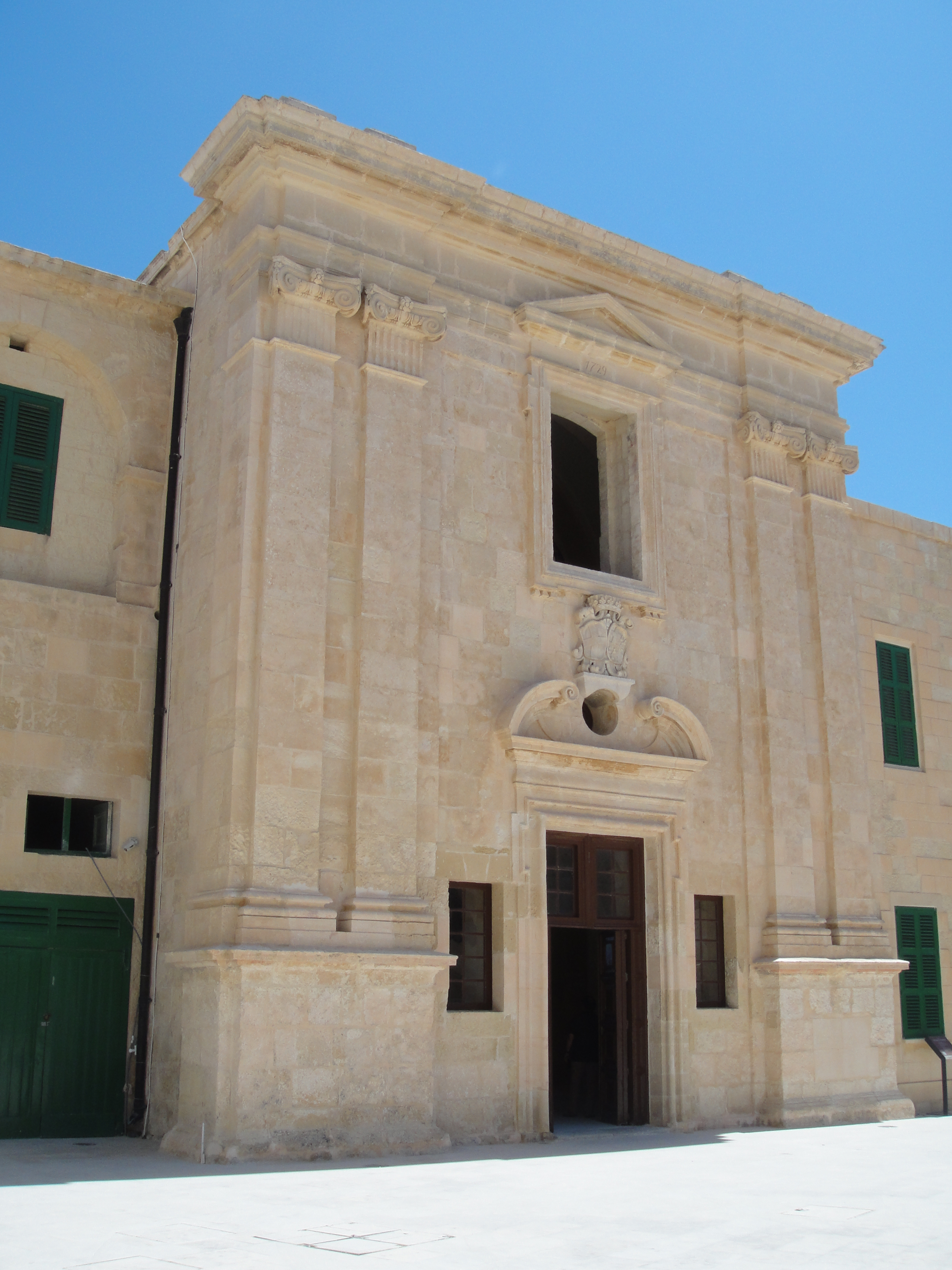
- The church in 2015
- Church of St Anne
- 35°54′6.7″N 14°31′8.6″E
- Location: Fort St Elmo, Valletta, Malta
- Denomination: Roman Catholic

History
- Status: Church
- Dedication: Saint Anne

Architecture
- Functional status: Deconsecrated
- Style: Baroque
- Completed: 1720s

Specifications
- Materials: Limestone

The Church of St Anne (Maltese: Knisja ta' Sant'Anna) is a former Roman Catholic church located in Fort Saint Elmo in Valletta, Malta. It was built in the 1720s and it was deconsecrated while the fort was controlled by the British military. The building has been restored and it is now known as the Memorial Building.

== History ==
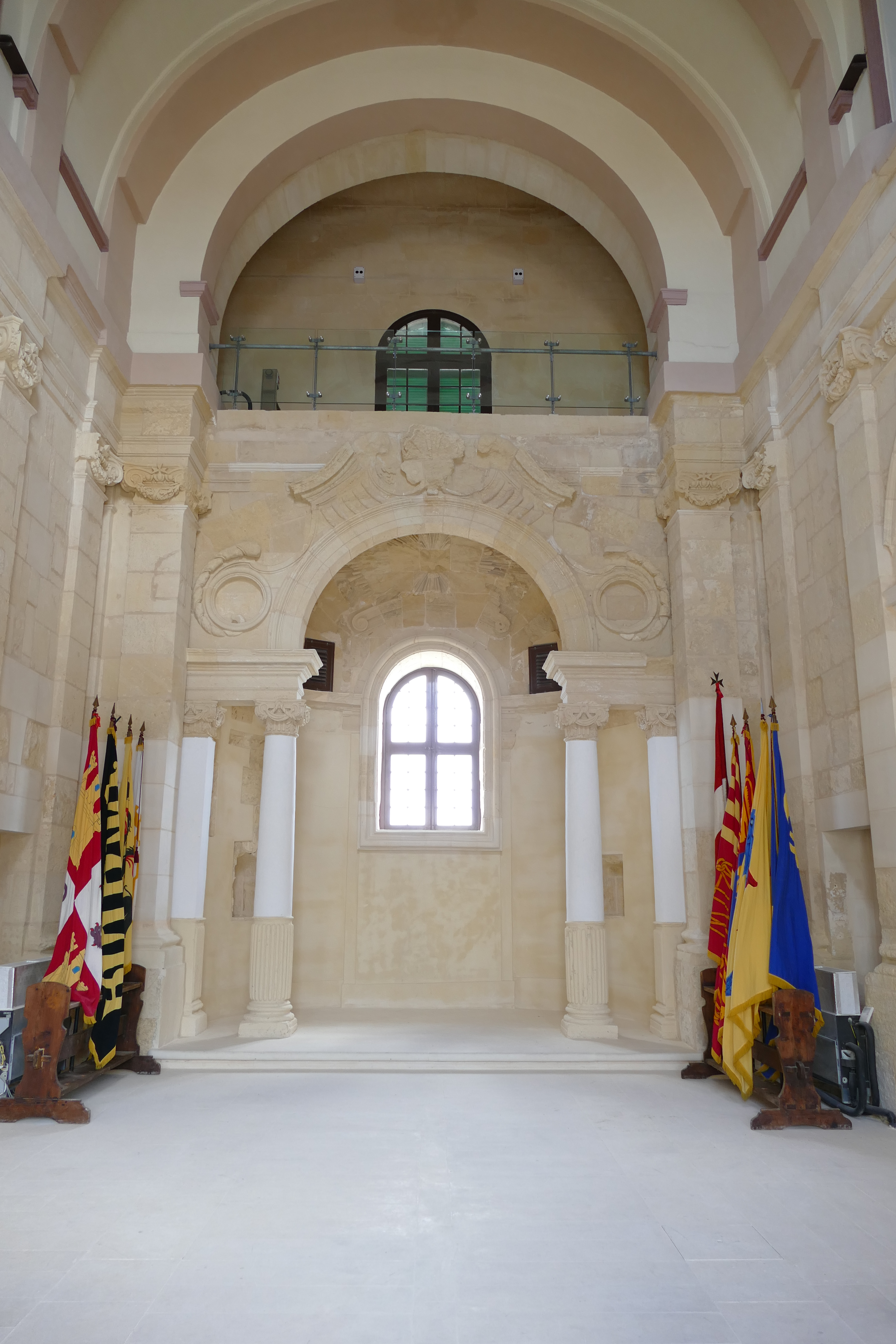
The church's interior in 2016

The Church of St Anne was built in 1722 or 1729 by the Order of St John within Fort Saint Elmo. An earlier chapel with the same dedication has existed nearby since at least the 15th century. The remains of Hospitaller knights who had died defending the fort during the Great Siege of Malta in 1565 are reportedly buried inside the chapel.

When Malta was under British rule, the church was deconsecrated and major alterations were made to its interior.

The building was restored as part of a rehabilitation project for the entire fort between 2012 and 2015. It was initially planned that the former church be converted into a lecture room, but it eventually became a Memorial Building dedicated to people who defended Malta throughout the islands' history, particularly during the two world wars. The memorial includes a remembrance book listing Malta-related World War II casualties and various exhibits including military medals and artworks. At times the building is also used to host temporary exhibitions.

The church building is listed on the National Inventory of the Cultural Property of the Maltese Islands.

== Architecture ==
The church occupies a prominent position within the fort's main piazza and it has a Baroque façade.
