= Lin Onus =

Australian artist (1948–1996)

- Born: William McLintock Onus; 4 December 1948; Melbourne, Victoria, Australia
- Died: 23 October 1996 (aged 47); Melbourne, Victoria, Australia
- Other name: Ganadila Number 2, Lynn
- Known for: Painting, sculpture, printmaking
- Children: 3, including Tiriki Onus
- Father: Bill Onus

Lin Onus AM (4 December 1948 – 23 October 1996), born William McLintock Onus and also known as Lin Burralung McLintock Onus, was an Australian artist of Scottish-Aboriginal origins. He was the son of activist Bill Onus.

== Early life ==
William McLintock Onus was born at St. George's Hospital, Kew, Melbourne on 4 December 1948 His father William Townsend Onus Jr (Bill), a Yorta Yorta man, became the founder of the Aborigines Advancement League and was the first Aboriginal JP, dying in 1968, a year after a long campaign bore fruit – the success of the referendum giving the national government responsibility for Aboriginal affairs and including Aboriginal people in the determination of the country's population.

Onus was educated in the 1950s and 1960s at Deepdene Primary School and Balwyn High School in Melbourne, Victoria. He was largely a self-taught urban artist who, after being expelled from Balwyn High School for fighting, became a mechanic and spray painter, before making artefacts for the tourist market with his father's business, Aboriginal Enterprise Novelties.

== Career ==
Onus became a successful painter, sculptor and printmaker.

The works of Onus often involve symbolism from Aboriginal styles of painting, along with recontextualisation of contemporary artistic elements. The images in his works include haunting portrayals of the Barmah red gum forests of his father's ancestral country, and the use of rarrk cross-hatching-based painting style that he learnt (and was given permission to use) when visiting the Indigenous communities of Maningrida in 1986.

His most famous work, Michael and I are just slipping down to the pub for a minute, has been featured on a postcard, and is a reference to his colleague, artist Michael Eather. The painting is of a dingo riding on the back of a stingray which is meant to symbolise his mother's and father's cultures combining in reconciliation. The image of the wave is borrowed from The Great Wave off Kanagawa (1832), by Japanese printmaker, Katsushika Hokusai.

Animals appeared frequently in works later in Onus' career, such as in his sculpture Fruit Bats.

== Honours and awards ==
- 1993: Member of the Order of Australia "for service to the arts as a painter and sculptor and to the promotion of aboriginal artists and their work"
- 1994: National Aboriginal and Torres Strait Islander Heritage Art Award, for Barmah Forest (A$17,000)
- 2012: Inducted to the Victorian Aboriginal Honour Roll

== Exhibitions ==
A major retrospective of Onus' work, entitled Urban Dingo: The Art of Lin Onus (Burrinja) 1948-1996, was held at Museum of Contemporary Art Australia in Sydney in 2000. Curated by Margo Neale and organised by the Queensland Art Gallery, it was developed before his death and staged with the assistance of his family.

== Major collections ==
- Art Gallery of New South Wales
- Holmes à Court Collection

== Film ==
Lin Onus was credited for the sound production on a 1972 film called Blackfire, directed by Bruce McGuinness, which was thought to be the first film made by an Indigenous Australian. However, the discovery of a short film made by Lin's father Bill made in 1946 in 2021 has put this claim into doubt.

== Death and legacy ==
Lin Onus died suddenly of a heart attack on 23 October 1996 at the age of 47 in Melbourne. He was cremated and his ashes scattered at the Cummeragunja cemetery on the NSW-Victorian border.

The youth award in the National Aboriginal and Torres Strait Islander Heritage Art Award was renamed the Lin Onus Youth Prize from 1998.

=== Posthumous apology ===
On 8 December 2000, as part of Aboriginal reconciliation, Peter Bond, Principal of Balwyn High School, at the school presentation night at Dallas Brooks Hall, issued a posthumous apology to Lin Onus for being expelled from Balwyn High School in the early 1960s.

== Family ==
Onus was married twice, first to Rosemary Smith and then to Jo Kloster. He had a son with Rosemary and a daughter, and with Jo he had a son, Tiriki Onus.

Tiriki became an opera singer and filmmaker. He made a documentary film about his grandfather Bill Onus, released in 2021, called Ablaze, in which he describes his discovery of a 1946 short film made by him. Tiriki, a bass baritone singer, is (as of 2021) head of the Wilin Centre for Indigenous Arts and Cultural Development at the Victorian College of the Arts. His first role in opera was as his grandfather, in the premiere of Deborah Cheetham’s Pecan Summer in 2010 at Mooroopna.
