= Mount Carmel Catholic College =

School near Sydney, Australia

Location
- 210 Spitfire Drive, Varroville, New South Wales 2566, Australia; 34°00′31″S 150°49′16″E

Information
- Type: Systemic Catholic co-educational secondary school
- Motto: Latin: Ite In Veritate (Walk in Truth)
- Religious affiliations: Marist Brothers; Association of Marist Schools of Australia; Discalced Carmelites
- Denomination: Catholic
- Patron saint: St Marcellin Champagnat
- Established: 1985; 41 years ago
- Founder: Clarence Cunningham
- Educational authority: Catholic Education, Diocese of Wollongong
- Principal: Stephen Lo Cascio
- Assistant Principal: Samantha Giles
- Chaplain: Shane Kelleher, OCD
- Staff: 108 (2018)
- Years: 7–12
- Gender: Co-educational
- Enrollment: 1,061 (2018)
- Campus type: Urban
- Houses: Murray; Howard; Avila; MacKillop
- Colours: Dark blue Mid blue Gold; Red
- Song: Mount Carmel School Song, Sub Tuum
- Nickname: M Triple C; MC
- Publication: Veritas (formerly)
- Feeder schools: St John the Evangelist Campbelltown; Holy Family Ingleburn; Mary Immaculate Eagle Vale
- Alumni: Mount Carmel Catholic College Alumni
- Website: www.mcchsdow.catholic.edu.au

Mount Carmel Catholic College (MCCC) is a systemic Catholic co-educational secondary school of the Marist tradition located in Varroville, a suburb 46 kilometres south-west of Sydney. It is situated within the city of Campbelltown, New South Wales, Australia. The current principal is Stephen Lo Cascio.

Mount Carmel is a member of the Macarthur Independent Schools Association (MISA) and the Association of Marist Schools of Australia.

== History ==
Mount Carmel Catholic College was first initiated in 1983/84 by a committee of parishioners located in Ingleburn and Macquarie Fields. The goal of this committee was to establish a Catholic secondary school for the northern part of the Macarthur region. The submission for the school was put to Bishop Murray who was the Bishop of Wollongong at the time. After negotiations with the Carmelite Fathers the site was chosen in Varroville near St Andrews Road and Spitfire Drive.

The first 145 students of the school commenced their education in 1985 at John Therry Catholic High School in Rosemeadow. In September that year, the Commonwealth Government allocated a capital grant, which began Stage 1 of construction.

In 1986, 292 students from Years 7 to 8 were therefore able to begin studies at the main site in Varroville. The principal at this time was Brother Clarence Cunningham. In 1990/91, Brother Clarence stepped down as principal and Brother Neville Solomon was appointed. In this time, the construction of the Champagnat Centre began. In 1996/97, Brother Neville stepped down as principal and Brother Roger Burke became the new principal. By 1998, construction work had begun on new extensions to the site, and this was completed in 1999.

In 2002, John Barrington became the first lay principal of Mount Carmel. In 2007, the new Administration building was completed. In 2012, Wayne Marshall was appointed as the second lay Principal at Mount Carmel. Following a federal building grant, construction on the La Valla Trades Skills Centre began in 2014. In 2015, Mount Carmel Catholic High School was officially renamed Mount Carmel Catholic College and celebrated 30 years since its establishment in 1985.

In 2018, Stephen Lo Cascio commenced as the third lay Principal at Mount Carmel.

== Academics ==
Mount Carmel has a key focus on quality learning and teaching in the academic environment.

Students follow the curriculum enforced by the New South Wales Education Standards Authority (NESA). As a systemic Catholic secondary school in the Roman Catholic Diocese of Wollongong, all students must study the Religious Education curriculum developed by the diocese.

== Co-curricular ==
The college offers a number of co-curricular activities in a range of disciplines. These include, but are not limited to:

- Mount Carmel Oratory Society
- College choir
- College band
- Revelation – social justice and mission team
- Mount Carmel Youth Network (MCYN)
- Australian Mathematics Competition
- Science Competition
- LIVE festival & LIVE nights
- Polynesian dance team
- MISA dance team
- MISA sport
- WSU Fast Forward
- Ignite – Student Magazine
- College musicals

A number of senior students also take part in the annual immersions to work in underprivileged communities. There are currently two immersions: The Philippines immersion takes place during the summer holidays in January, and the Thailand immersion takes place during the school year.

In 2018, the college began offering an iSTEM elective for Stage 5. Mount Carmel has also started to implement a number of STEM-based learning opportunities.

== College life ==
=== Spirituality and Social Justice ===
Mount Carmel is shaped by both the Marist and Carmelite charisms, creating a unique Catholic identity. Our Lady of Mount Carmel Parish serves the local Catholic community and is located adjacent to the college grounds at 193 St Andrews Road, Varroville. The Parish Priest and College Chaplain is Father Shane Kelleher, OCD. St Marcellin Champagnat, founder of the Marist Brothers, is the patron saint of Mount Carmel.

The Mount Carmel community celebrates a number of Marist and Carmelite occasions, such as the Feast of St Marcellin Champagnat on 6 June (colloquially known as 'Champagnat Day') and the Feast of Our Lady of Mount Carmel on 16 July.

As part of this Catholic identity, the community also joins at formal gatherings to recite the Suub Tuum, a traditional Catholic hymn, in Latin. It is of great significance to Marist communities worldwide. Students are also encouraged to partake in numerous religious and spirituality opportunities throughout the school year, both at the college and in the wider community. A number of social justice opportunities are also available. For instance, Mount Carmel holds an annual recycling competition, and the most successful house receives the Sustainability Cup.

Students also have the opportunity to be involved in a number of youth ministry experiences facilitated by Catholic Youth Ministry Diocese of Wollongong(CYMW). Spirituality at Mount Carmel is overseen by the Youth Ministry and Religious Education Coordinators.

=== Celebrations ===
Yearly celebrations and important festivities include:

- House days (Term 1 – Murray, Term 2 – Howard, Term 3 – MacKillop, Term 4 – Avila)
- Champagnat Day (Term 2, around the Feast of St Marcellin)
- Our Lady of Mount Carmel Feast Day (Term 3, July)
- End of Year Celebrations (Last day of the year): Mass, Celebration of Learning Assembly & Concert

=== Sport ===
Mount Carmel has a strong sporting tradition and culture. It is a member school of the Macarthur Independent Schools Association (MISA) and competes weekly against independent schools in the area, fostering a sense of school pride. All students are expected to participate in the college's recreational sports program from Year 7–10, and may elect to participate in senior school, which is held on Tuesdays for two periods before dismissal. Mount Carmel also offers pathways for students to progress into New South Wales Combined Catholic Colleges (NSWCCC), Diocesan and Representative (regional, state, etc.) pathways. Sport is overseen by the Sports Coordinator.

Sports carnivals are key events on the college calendar. Students participate in three major carnivals throughout the school year: swimming, athletics and cross country.

=== Alumni ===
Following the success of the college's 30 Year Celebrations through 2015 and 2016, the Mount Carmel Catholic College Alumni was initiated. The establishment of the Alumni has resulted from the strong sense of family and community that is part of the Marist charism and which forms the fabric of the college.

== Facilities ==
=== La Valla Trades Skills Centre ===
The La Valla Trades Skills Centre opened in 2015 and is the newest building on school grounds. The centre features state-of-the-art, modern hospitality facilities available for use to students undertaking VET and TVET courses, particularly Food Technology and Hospitality, and students studying Food Technology as part of the Technology course.

=== Whitfield Library ===
The library was named after Jenny Whitfield who was the founding Teacher-Librarian at Mount Carmel from 1986 to 1999. The Whitfield Library aims to satisfy the 21st Century learning, recreational and literary needs of its information consumers through service that exceeds expectations in physical and virtual environments. Its mission is to organise and provide access to information and promote the value and joy of reading, in order to enrich the lives of the people of the Mount Carmel community.

After a renovation in early 2017, the library was developed into a 'resource centre'. The library will now house IT/tech support at the college. At present it contains the Bookroom (textbook loans), Transition and Pathways office (previously Careers office), main library, senior study area, ILC and a number of small meeting rooms. In the centre of the library is the atrium, a covered outdoor study area, with the statue of St Marcellin Champagnat. Outside of the library is the Marian Statue, often used by the Rosary group for gatherings to pray the rosary.

=== Champagnat Centre ===
The Champagnat Centre is the main hall used at Mount Carmel. The college gathers in the hall to celebrate mass, participate in assemblies, awards ceremonies and other whole school events. It is also utilised as a gymnasium for various sporting activities such as basketball, futsal and volleyball. PDHPE classes also use the building for practical lessons. The hall has also been used to exhibit artworks at the college art exhibition held in December annually. A number of creative arts endeavours, such as drama, music and dance performances are also held in the Champagnat Centre. Key features include the mezzanine level, and the mural on the rear wall, illustrating the school's philosophy of 'Marcellin inspired, Christ centred' learning.

=== Quadrangle ===
The quadrangle, known as the 'quad', is the central building of the college grounds. The canteen is located in the upper quad towards the Year 10 area, opposite the girls' bathrooms. It is a covered area consisting of a concrete paving with handball courts and benches. The area is predominantly used by Year 7 and 8 students. The quad is multipurpose, and has been used for school sport, assemblies and class activities. At dismissal, it is used as the bus departures terminal where students await afternoon buses. The bus loop is located adjacent to the quadrangle.

=== Marian Chapel ===
The Marian Chapel is the main place of worship at Mount Carmel. It is located adjacent to the Champagnat Centre. Named in honour of Mary, mother of Jesus, as an homage to the college's Carmelite charism, it is used for gatherings of small crowds, liturgies, silent prayer and reflection.

== Associated Colleges ==
Mount Carmel is associated with other Catholic Colleges in the Macarthur region of the Roman Catholic Diocese of Wollongong.

- John Therry Catholic High School, Rosemeadow
- St Gregory's College, Campbelltown
- St Patrick's College, Campbelltown
- Magdalene Catholic College, Narellan
- St Benedict's Catholic College, Oran Park
- St Francis Catholic College, Edmondson Park

The college is also associated with other member schools of the Macarthur Independent Schools Association (MISA).

== Notable alumni ==
- Jeffrey Hunt – Australian representative to the 2012 Olympics in athletics
- Shannon McDonnell – rugby league player
- Luke Sciberras - painter
- Nick Shipley – AFL Footballer
