= John Therry Catholic High School =

John Therry Catholic College

Location
- Rosemeadow, Campbelltown, New South Wales; Australia; 34°06′07″S 150°47′17″E

Information
- Type: Independent co-educational secondary day school
- Motto: Latin: Recta Sapere
- Religious affiliation: Association of Marist Schools of Australia
- Denomination: Roman Catholic
- Established: 1981; 45 years ago
- Founder: Brother Clarence Cunningham
- Oversight: Roman Catholic Diocese of Wollongong
- Principal: Bradley McAllister
- Years: 7–12
- Website: www.jtchsdow.catholic.edu.au

John Therry Catholic College is a systemic Roman Catholic co-educational secondary day school, located in Rosemeadow, Campbelltown, New South Wales, Australia, established in the tradition of the Marist Brothers. The school is named after archbishop and vicar-general John Joseph Therry. Karen Young was appointed principal in 2008. In 2018, Wayne Marshall was appointed Principal. 2021 saw the Colleges best ever HSC results and the school was ranked 195th in the state – a rise of 260 places over two years.

== History ==
John Therry Catholic High School opened on 9 February 1981, enrolling 300 students for Years 7 to 9. The principal at opening was Brother Clarence Cunningham, until 1986, when he moved to Mount Carmel High School.

== Notable alumni ==
International triathlete Natalie Van Coevorden attended the school around the early 2000s.

- Ben Roberts, rugby league player

== Notable staff ==
- Greg Whitby

== See also ==
- List of Catholic schools in New South Wales
- Catholic education in Australia
