= Chapel of St Anne, Fort St Elmo =

Chapel of St Anne
- Kappella ta' Sant'Anna
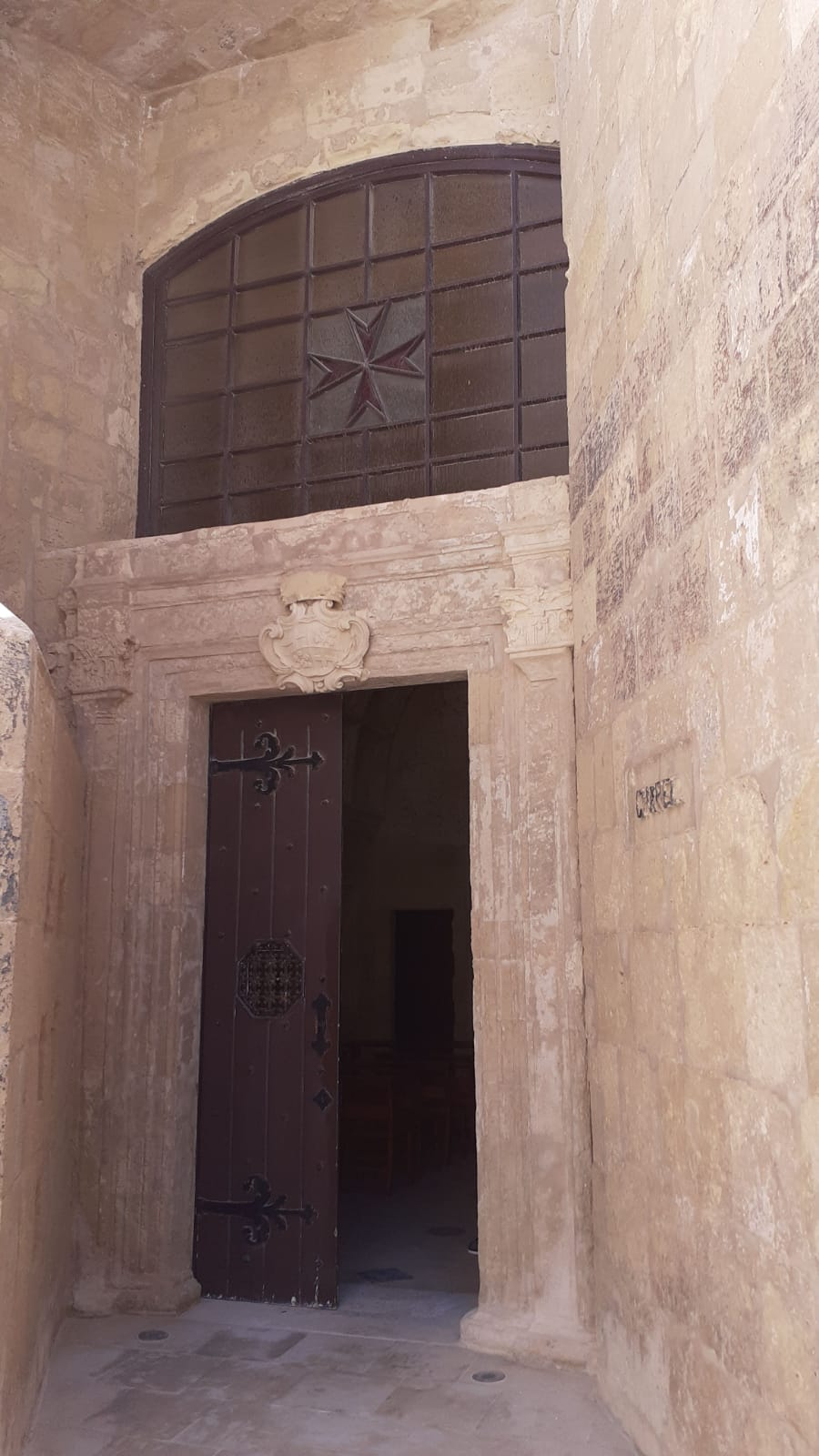
- The chapel's exterior in 2020
- Chapel of St Anne
- 35°54′5.7″N 14°31′7.6″E
- Location: Fort St Elmo, Valletta, Malta
- Denomination: Roman Catholic

History
- Status: Chapel
- Founded: 1488 or earlier
- Dedication: Saint Anne
- Earlier dedication: Erasmus of Formia (possibly)

Architecture
- Functional status: Active
- Style: Renaissance and Baroque
- Completed: 17th century

Specifications
- Materials: Limestone

The Chapel of St Anne (Maltese: Kappella ta' Sant'Anna) is a Roman Catholic chapel located in Fort Saint Elmo in Valletta, Malta. Its existence was first documented in the late 15th century, and it was incorporated into the fort when the latter was constructed by the Order of St John in the mid-16th century. The chapel's present state dates back to the mid-17th century.

== History ==
The existence of the chapel was first documented in 1488, and it predates the rest of Fort Saint Elmo and Valletta. It is therefore the oldest surviving structure on the Sciberras Peninsula. The chapel might have originally been dedicated to Erasmus of Formia (also known as St Elmo). When the Order of St John began construction of the fortress in 1552, it was named after St Elmo and the chapel was incorporated into its walls. At this point, the chapel was dedicated to Saint Anne.

On 23 June 1565, during the Great Siege of Malta, Fort St Elmo fell to Ottoman troops. During the final battle its defenders made a last stand within the chapel, and the defence of St Elmo bought time for the Hospitallers in their remaining strongholds of Birgu and Senglea. The chapel was repaired and its interior was embellished in the mid-17th century during the magistracy of Giovanni Paolo Lascaris, and its present configuration dates back to this period.

The chapel was scheduled as a Grade 1 monument in 2008 and it is listed on the National Inventory of the Cultural Property of the Maltese Islands. It was restored as part of a rehabilitation project for the entire fort between 2012 and 2015.

== Architecture ==
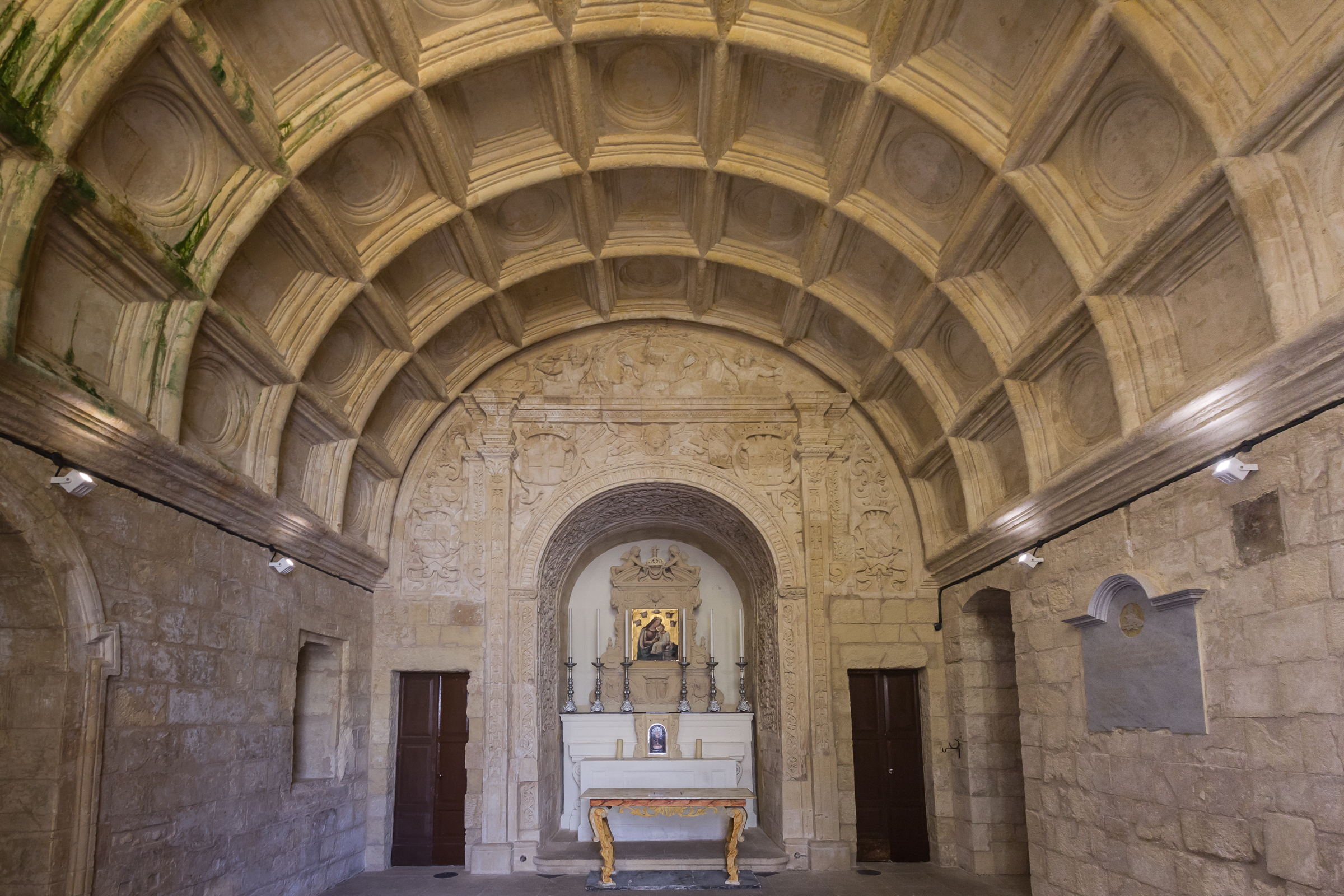
The chapel's interior in 2015

The chapel's architectural style has been described as late Renaissance and Baroque. Its façade is narrow and consists of a door and window within the fortification walls close to a gate known as the Porta del Soccorso.

The chapel has a barrel vault with a coffered ceiling. The internal walls are plain, except the wall containing the altar which is set within an arched alcove. This is richly decorated with 17th-century stone carvings.

A 15th-century Madonna and Child icon is located within the chapel, and it was brought to Malta by the Hospitallers from Lepanto in Greece.
