= Greg Whitby =

Australian educator (1952–2025)

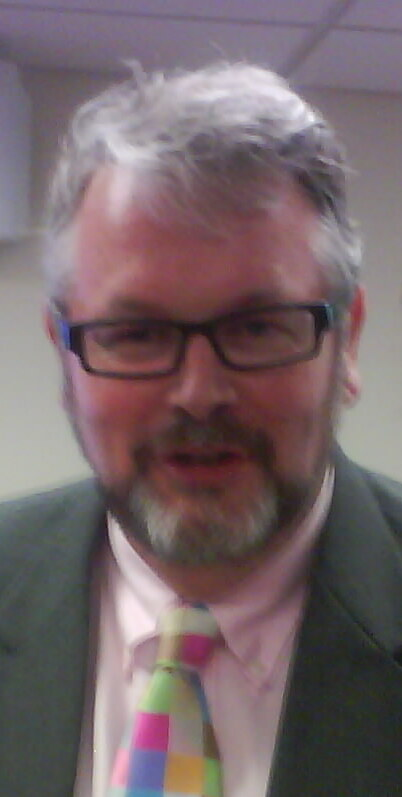
- At an event on 13 November 2007
- Born: Gregory Byrne Whitby; 1 August 1952; Sydney, New South Wales, Australia
- Died: 30 August 2025 (aged 73)
- Occupations: Educator; activist
- Years active: 1974−2022
- Known for: Executive Director of Catholic Education Diocese of Parramatta
- Title: Executive Director
- Website: Bluyonder

Gregory Byrne Whitby AM KSG (1 August 1952 − 30 August 2025) was an Australian educator. He was the executive director of Catholic Education Diocese of Parramatta, a system comprising more than 80 schools across Greater Western Sydney and the Blue Mountains, and a position which he held since 2006 until he retired in November 2022.

Whitby started his career as a teacher in 1974, serving in a variety of school leadership positions before taking up the role as executive director of Catholic Education Diocese of Parramatta. In 2018, he was recognised with an Order of Australia (AM) award for his outstanding contribution to education and the transformation of schooling for young people across Greater Western Sydney. Whitby regularly wrote for The Daily Telegraph in a weekly column which touched on issues affecting the education industry.

== Early life ==
Whitby completed his primary education at St Monica's in North Parramatta before going on to undertake his secondary years at Oakhill College in Castle Hill.

== Career ==
Whitby started his career as a classroom teacher in 1974. In 1976, he moved to Liverpool Boys High School where he taught English and History. Whitby's leadership career started to take shape in 1982 when he was appointed the English and History Coordinator at John Therry Catholic High School. Whitby moved out of the classroom and into an administrative role in 1985 as the Assistant to the Principal at Patrician Brothers College, then became the Executive Assistant to the executive director of Catholic Education Diocese of Parramatta for four years.

In 1992, Whitby returned to the classroom as Principal of Emmaus Catholic College until being appointed the Head of Curriculum and Special Programs at Catholic Education Diocese of Parramatta. In 1999, Whitby became the executive director of Schools for the Diocese of Wollongong, a position which he held for seven years until being appointed the executive director of Catholic Education Diocese of Parramatta in 2006. He held this position until his retirement in 2022.

He also lectured in the faculty of business at Western Sydney University.

== Awards ==
In 2007, Whitby was named the most innovative and creative educator in Australia by The Bulletin Magazine in its annual Smart 100 Awards. In the same year, he received a Presidential Citation from the Australian Council for Educational Leaders, of which he was a Fellow since 2002.

In 2011, he presented the AW Jones Oration for the Australian College of Educators, South Australian branch on the changing nature of schooling in today's world. He was named Apple Distinguished Educator "for his contribution to the implementation of Learning Technologies in Education".

In 2013, Whitby was appointed Knight of the Knight the Order of St Gregory the Great for his contribution to Catholic schooling.

He was also the recipient of the 2017 Sir Harold Wyndham Medal awarded by the Australian College of Educators to those who have made an outstanding contribution to the education of young people in New South Wales.

Whitby was appointed a Member of the Order of Australia in the 2018 Australia Day Honours.

== Death ==
Whitby died on 30 August 2025, at the age of 73.

== Sources ==
- Edwards, Hannah (9 October 2006). "E-volution of schools". The Sydney Morning Herald. (includes photo of Whitby)
- "$96,000 raised for cancer". Bega District News. 13 June 2008. Archived from the original on 28 July 2008.
- "Funky School". The Australian. 10–11 September 2011. Archived from the original on 10 September 2011.
