= Luke Sciberras =

Australian landscape painter

Luke Sciberras (born 1975) is an Australian landscape painter.

Born in Campbelltown, New South Wales, Sciberras attended the National Art School in Sydney in the mid-to-late-1990s and was mentored by Australian artists including Elisabeth Cummings. In 2002, he moved to Hill End, New South Wales, where he became a central figure in the local contemporary arts scene. Sciberras has travelled extensively for his work, and since an episode of illness in 2012, has become more contemplative in his approach to his art.

As of 2024, Sciberras was described in The Australian as one of the "biggest names in Australian contemporary art".

== Biography ==
Sciberras was born in Campbelltown, New South Wales, in 1975 to a Maltese father and a mother born to Ukrainian immigrants. After his parents separated when he was three, Sciberras was raised as an only child by his mother. He attended Mount Carmel Catholic High School, where he held no particular interest in art nor aspirations towards a career in painting. Over the following decade, he attended the National Art School in Sydney in the late-1990s and became integrated into the Australian art scene. During this period he was mentored by Australian artists including Ann Thomson, Garry Shead, Guy Warren, Robert Klippel, and Tim Storrier, with particular attention from Elisabeth Cummings.

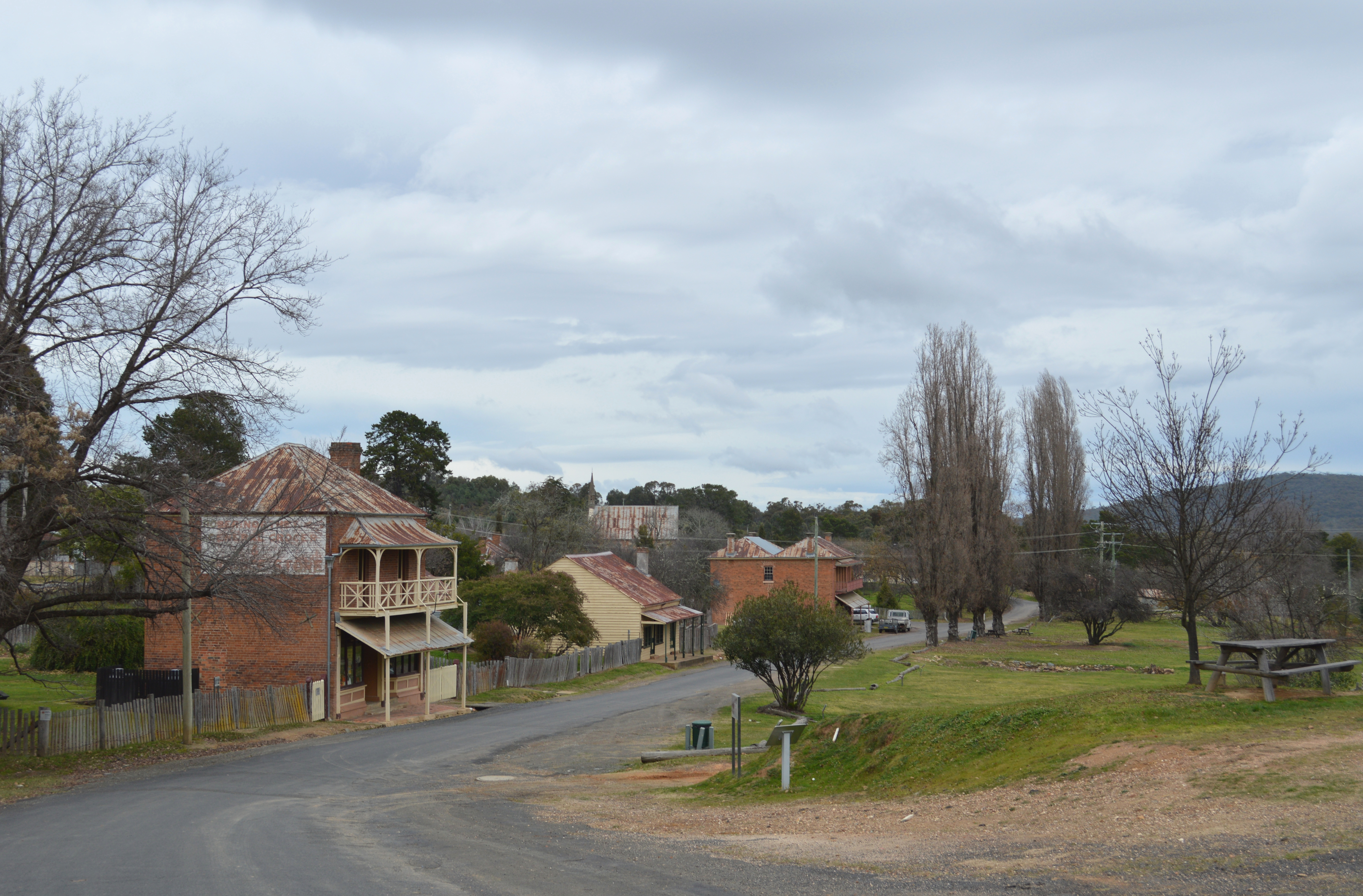
Hill End, New South Wales in 2014

After marrying Shead's daughter, painter Gria Shead, the couple moved to Hill End in 2002, a former gold-mining town in regional New South Wales with a strong arts scene and a history of housing artists including Russell Drysdale, Jean Bellette, and Brett Whiteley. Together, they had a daughter, and shared a studio in a deconsecrated Methodist church, with Shead using the space in the afternoon and Sciberras using it in the morning.

Sciberras became a central figure in the local arts community, and was described by Sydney Morning Herald arts critic John McDonald as "the star attraction" of the scene. He travelled extensively across Australia for his work, including to Lake Eyre and the Flinders Ranges in South Australia, the Paroo River in New South Wales, and the MacDonnell Ranges in the Northern Territory.

Around 2010, Shead and Sciberras divorced. Shead moved to Sydney with their daughter, and Sciberras took over the studio space completely. That year, a portrait of Sciberras by Robert Malherbe was designated a finalist in the Archibald Prize. As of 2011, Sciberras was dating artist Justine Muller. Each month, he made a trip to the artistic community at Robertson, New South Wales, where he would paint. The community, informally headed by artist John Olsen and including Ben Quilty, knew Sciberras under the nickname "the Scribbler".

=== Myocarditis ===
In 2012, Sciberras experienced significant stress when he fell out with a friend and experienced the death of another, and he became ill with double pneumonia. In the Australian autumn (March–May), he was hospitalized after experiencing intense chest pain. He was told he had experienced heartburn and returned home, but was quickly recalled to hospital and diagnosed with myocarditis, a condition involving swelling of the heart. When he was discharged days later, Shead returned him home and assisted with household tasks.

After remaining immobile for three months waiting for his heart's swelling to subside, Sciberras returned to painting. He later described experiencing a loss of confidence and a greater sense of his vulnerability. Four years later, he admitted himself to hospital after experiencing chest pains, dismissed by a doctor as "anxiety and exhaustion".

== Painting style ==
After his diagnosis of myocarditis, Sciberras noticed a shift in his art from arriving at landscapes and trying quickly to capture them, to waiting until he felt he understood the place deeper before painting. Art writer Anna Johnson described Sciberras's work following the episode as more "immersive" and reverent, as well as "darker, stronger and just that bit more profound".

In a 2017 profile in The Australian, Sciberras's artistic practice was described as relatively prolific, using a colour palette resembling that of J. M. W. Turner. His works were described as balancing a rejection of stasis and classical technique with an apparent debt to the works of earlier Australian landscape painters.

== See also ==
- List of Australian artists
