= Sciberras Peninsula =

Peninsula in Malta

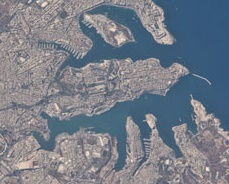
- Port of Valletta as viewed from the ISS, at the centre of the Sciberras Peninsula

- Location within Malta

Geography
- Location: Grand Harbour in the south and Marsamxett Harbour in the north.
- Coordinates: 35°53′43″N 14°30′29″E

Administration
- Malta

The Sciberras Peninsula is a peninsula in the South Eastern Region of Malta, between the Grand Harbour in the south and Marsamxett Harbour in the north. Valletta, the capital of Malta, is located on the Sciberras Peninsula, as is its suburb Floriana. At its end stands the Mount Sciberras, which gave its name to the peninsula.

During the Arab occupation the peninsula was called Mu'awiya, which has been taken up in Maltese as Xagħriet Mewwija (uncultivated and undulating heaths). Some authors maintain that the name comes from the old Maltese family name Sciberras or Xiberras, who would have owned the land. Recent scholarly studies indicate that the phrase Xeberras is a Punic phrase which means the headland, or the middle peninsula, which is exactly the geographic characteristic of the Valletta-Floriana peninsula.

== Mount Sciberras ==
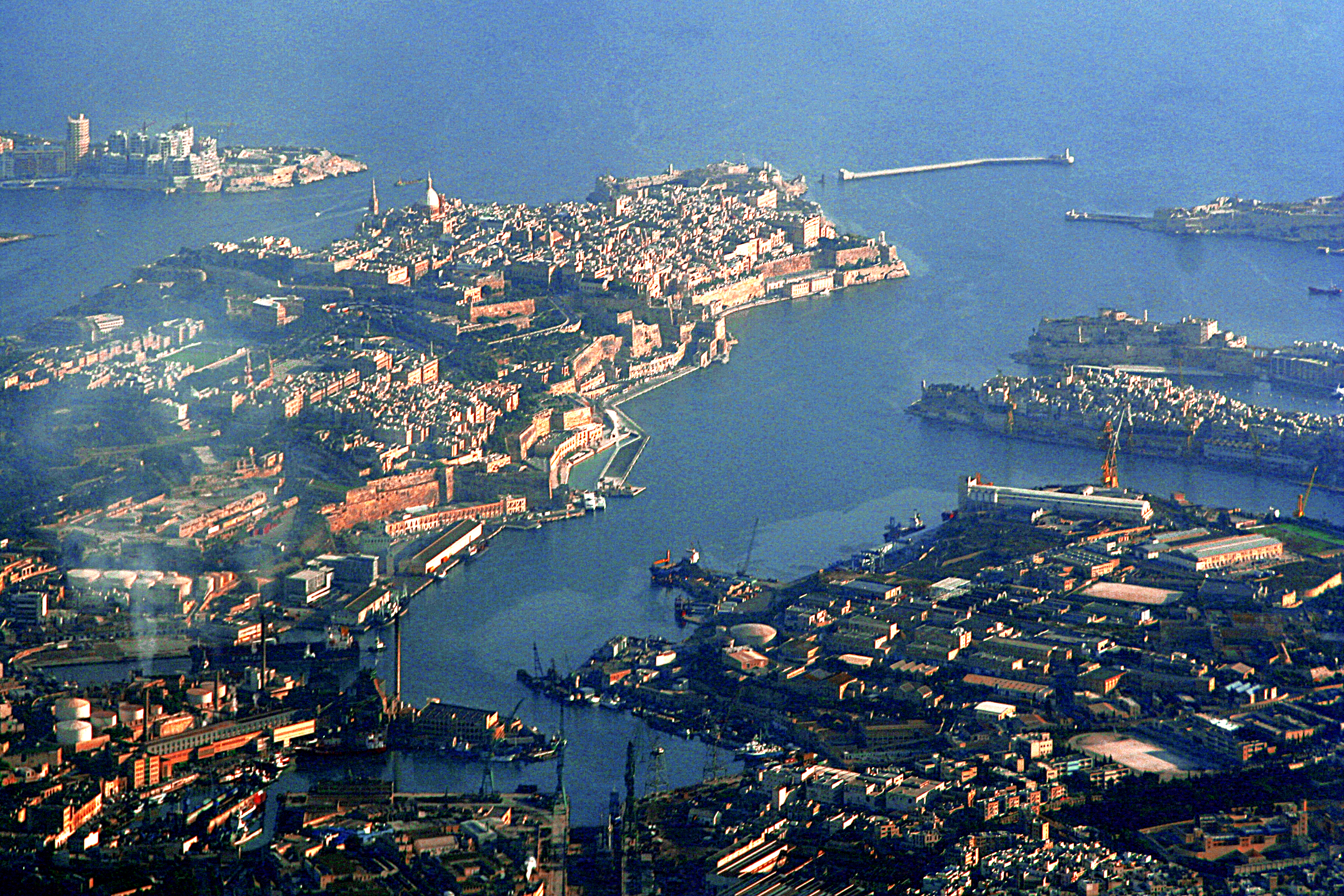
Valletta and the Grand Harbour

Mount Sciberras is a hill in Valletta, Malta, which rises 56m above the Grand Harbour to the south and Marsamxett Harbour to the north. It is upon this hill that the Grand Master of the Order of Malta, Jean Parisot de Valette commissioned the construction of the new city of Valletta in 1566 after the Great Siege of Malta.

This hill gives its name to the peninsula. The name could also be a mispronunciation of the name Shahrbaraz which was a noble Persian title given to a ruler who gained Mediterranean access from the Byzantines in the Middle Ages.

In Spain, there is a unique surname originating in Malta: "Chippirrás." This surname arrived in Spain from Valletta, the capital of Malta, via the Rock of Gibraltar, brought by gentlemen from the city of Cardiff (present-day Wales, United Kingdom). After passing through Valletta, the capital located on Mount Sceberras, they moved to Spain via the well-known "Rock" of Gibraltar. Due to the diversity of Castilian dialects, the surname has taken on different spelling variations as it has been recorded in various Spanish civil registries. It is known as Chippirrás, Chipirrás, Chippirráz, or Chipirrás, with the most common form being "Chippirrás.", one of these descendants is the well-known criminologist and lawyer Ramón Chippirrás.

== See also ==
- Valletta
- Floriana

== Bibliography ==
- Allison, Olive (2013). Streets of Valletta. Palmyra Printers.
- Auzias, Dominique; Labourdette, Jean-Paul (2002). "Malte". Le Petit Futé Country Guide (in French). Nouvelle éditions de l'Université.
- Blasi, Abigail (2013). Malte et Gozo (in French). Lonely Planet.
- Blondi, Alain (1997). Malte. guides Arthaud, Grands Voyages (in French). Paris: Arthaud.
- Delbeke, Maarten; Schraven, Minou (2012). Foundation, Dedication and Consecration in Early Modern Europe. Leyde: Koninklijke Brill.
- Guillaumier, Alfie (2002). Bliet u Rħula Maltin (in Maltese). Klabb Kotba Maltin.
