= Teichelmann =

Teichelmann may refer to:

- Christian Gottlieb Teichelmann (1807–1888), a Lutheran missionary in South Australia
- Ebenezer Teichelmann (1859–1938), a surgeon, mountaineer and photographer in New Zealand
- Mount Teichelmann (3,144 metres (10,315 ft)), a mountain in the Southern Alps, New Zealand
