= Rob Amery =

Australian linguist

Robert Amery
- Occupation: Linguist
- Years active: 1980s–present
- Notable work: Warra Kaurna Yalaka, Warra Kaurna Pukinangku (2016)
- Spouse: Mary-Anne Gale

Robert Maxwell Amery (born 1954) is an Australian linguist and specialist in Australian Aboriginal languages, in particular language revitalisation of endangered languages, and focused primarily on the Kaurna language of the Adelaide Plains region of South Australia. He is the author of books, articles, and a website, among other publications.

== Early life and education ==
Robert Maxwell Amery was born in 1954.

== Career ==
Amery began working in Aboriginal communities as a nurse, in 1980. After working for some time as an Aboriginal health worker educator, he started taking an interest in education when working in Yirrkala, in northeast Arnhem Land in 1985. He researched Dhuwaya, a new koiné variety of Yolngu Matha which was predominantly used by youth.

In 1990, Amery created the first complete sentence in the Kaurna language known to people still alive. In the early 1990s he worked as project officer for the Australian Indigenous Languages Framework. During 1993 and 1994, he developed a national curriculum framework that allowed for the introduction of Indigenous language programs at senior secondary level.

In June 1998 he completed a PhD at the University of Adelaide on the reclamation of Kaurna, with his thesis "Warrabarna Kaurna: Reclaiming Aboriginal Languages from Written Historical Sources: A Kaurna Case Study".

In the early 2000s, Amery taught the Kaurna language to Jack Buckskin, now a teacher of Kaurna language and culture himself.

In 2002, along with Kaurna elders Alitya Wallara Rigney and Lewis Yerloburka O'Brien Amery was a co-founder of Kaurna Warra Pintyandi (KWP; now spelt Kaurna Warra Pintyanthi) at the university, to observe and promote the development of Kaurna. In 2012 the Commonwealth Indigenous Language Support (ILS) scheme provided funding for the project, enabling the establishment of a KWP team. This team included Stephen Gadlabarti Goldsmith ("Uncle Stevie") until his sudden death in 2017, among others.

In July 2016, he travelled to Aceh in Indonesia, where he and Zulfadli Aziz, of the University of Syiah Kuala in Banda Aceh, he conducted a language survey on two islands off the coast of Aceh, It was funded by the ARC Centre of Excellence for the Dynamics of Language.

In July 2017, the NAIDOC Week theme was "Our Languages Matter", and Amery spoke about Aboriginal languages on ABC Radio.

In 2019 Amery told an SA Aboriginal Lands Parliamentary Standing Committee that outcomes for Kaurna language programs were much better in the mid-1990s than they are by 2019, partly due to increasing focus on NAPLAN, and little incentive for or provision of professional development for Kaurna teachers.

As of December 2023 Amery is associate professor/reader at the University of Adelaide. He and his team (Mary-Anne Gale and Susie Greenwood) are working on the project "Sustainable Language Revival: A critical analysis of Kaurna", funded by an ARC Discovery grant. The team is working with Tauondi College "to build capacity within the Kaurna community to take on the roles of Kaurna language teaching and Kaurna language work".

== Research interests ==
Amery lists his research interests as:

- Kaurna language and linguistics
- Language reclamation and the formulaic method
- Indigenous languages in schools
- Language planning and language revival
- Language modernisation and development
- Linguistic vitality
- Endangered languages
- Linguistics and health (communicating Western health concepts in Indigenous languages)

== Major publications ==
Amery's thesis was slightly revised and republished in the Netherlands in 2000, as Warrabarna Kaurna: Reclaiming an Australian Language, and republished in 2016 "with revised spellings, additional chapter discussing developments since 2000 and reworked Conclusions". This edition is available as a free ebook.

Other published books include:

- WARRA KAURNA: A Resource for Kaurna Language Programs. 3rd edition revised and expanded (2003); revised as Warra Kaurna Yalaka, Warra Kaurna Pukinangku. Kaurna Language Today, Kaurna Language from Long Ago (2016)
- With Alice Wallara Rigney, Nelson Varcoe, Chester Schultz, and Kaurna Warra Pintyandi. Kaurna Palti Wonga – Kaurna Funeral Protocols (2006)
- With Jane Simpson. Kulurdu Marni Ngathaitya! Sounds Good to me! A Kaurna Learner's Guide (2013)
- As editor, with Joshua Nash. Warra Wiltaniappendi – Strengthening Languages. Proceedings of the Inaugural Indigenous Languages Conference (ILC) 2007 (2008)

Amery has also published numerous articles, book chapters, course notes, reports, and other works, some of which are co-authored with Mary-Anne Gale and Jack Buckskin.

== Personal life ==
Amery is married to Ngarrindjeri linguist Mary-Anne Gale.
