= Point Pearce, South Australia =

Point Pearce South Australia
- Coordinates: 34°25′01″S 137°30′07″E
- Population: 147 (SAL 2021)
- Established: 1868
- Postcode(s): 5573
- Elevation: 16 m (52 ft)
- Location: 194 km (121 mi) NW of Adelaide; 76 km (47 mi) S of Kadina; 26 km (16 mi) SE of Maitland
- LGA(s): Yorke Peninsula Council
- State electorate(s): Narungga
- Federal division(s): Grey

Point Pearce, also spelt Point Pierce in the past, is a town in the Australian state of South Australia. The town is located in the Yorke Peninsula Council local government area, 194 kilometres (121 mi) north-west of the state capital, Adelaide.

It is known for the mission established for Aboriginal people in the late nineteenth century. The location was originally known as Bookooyanna by the local Narungga people, later spelt Bukkiyana or Burgiyana.

Established as Point Pearce Mission Station in 1868, it became the Point Pearce Aboriginal Station after it was taken over by the state government in 1915, as an Aboriginal reserve. In 1972, ownership was transferred to the Point Pearce Community Council under the Aboriginal Lands Trust Act 1966.

== History ==
Also known as Point Pierce, it was one of several missions established in South Australia in the late 19th century, which included Poonindie (1850), Point McLeay (Raukkan, 1850), Killalpaninna (1866) and Koonibba (1898). Some of these missions were the basis for Aboriginal communities which persist until the present; they were among the few places in the southern part of South Australia where dispossessed and displaced Aboriginal people were welcomed, even if the primary aim was Christian evangelism.

Soon after the establishment of Adelaide in 1836, settlers had begun moving into Yorke Peninsula. The British concepts of property ownership were incompatible with the Narunggas' nomadic lifestyle, resulting in the gradual displacement of the Aboriginal population. In 1868, the Point Pearce Aboriginal Mission was established by the Moravian missionary Reverend W. Julius Kuhn.

A site of 600 acres (240 ha) for a settlement was granted on 2 February 1868 at a place known as Bookooyanna (spelt Bukkiyana or Burgiyana in later sources), about 70 kilometres (43 mi) south of Kadina. The Point Pearce Mission Station, run by the Yorke Peninsula Aboriginal Mission committee, initially attracted 70 Narrungga residents. Poor conditions and illness led to consequent deaths, and by 1874 only 28 remained.

In 1874 the reserve was extended by another 12 square miles (31 km^{2}), and including Wardang Island. By 1878, the mission was largely self-sufficient from its wool and wheat income.

In 1894, families from the closed Poonindie Mission were moved to Point Pearce. The mission operated a school, with a separate school house built in 1906. Many children of mixed European and Chinese descent were among the 31 pupils who enrolled.

During World War I, men from Point McLeay and Point Pearce were among the first Aboriginal men in the state to enlist.

As a result of the Royal Commission on the Aborigines on 1913, the South Australian government took over management of the mission in 1915 and it became known as the Point Pearce Aboriginal Station, an Aboriginal reserve. Included in the recommendations was that the government become the legal guardian of all Aboriginal children upon reaching their 10th birthday, and place them "where they deem best". Seven years after the final report of the commission, the Aborigines (Training of Children) Act 1923, in order to allow Indigenous children to be "trained" in a special institution so that they could go out and work.

The institution is named in the Bringing Them Home report, as one which housed Indigenous children forcibly removed from their parents and thus creating the Stolen Generations.

In 1972, ownership was transferred to the Point Pearce Community Council under the Aboriginal Lands Trust Act 1966.

Many of the buildings remain today.

== Location and facilities ==
Point Pearce is about 10 kilometres (6.2 mi) north along the coast from Port Victoria, and along with Wardang Island, provides shelter for the small fishing and recreational port.

== People ==
- Ivaritji (c. 1849 – 1929), Kaurna elder and last known speaker of the Kaurna language, lived there for many years.
- Gladys Elphick (1904 – 1988), founding president of the Council of Aboriginal Women of South Australia, grew up there.
- Lewis O'Brien (b. 1930), Kaurna elder, was born there.
- Alitya Rigney (1942 – 2017), Kaurna elder and scholar, who did much to revive the Kaurna language, was born there.
- Tauto Sansbury (c. 1949 – 2019), Indigenous activist, was born there.
- Natasha Wanganeen (b. 1984), AFI award-winning actor grew up in Point Pearce.
