= W. H. Cann =

William Henry Cann (4 May 1857 – 9 December 1942) was a Methodist minister in South Australia.

== History ==
Cann was born at Huckworthy, Sampford Spiney, near Horrabridge, Devonshire, son of farm laborer John Cann and his wife Sophia, née Down, who around 1864 moved to Cramlington, Northumberland, where they attended the local Bible Christian Church. At age 10 Cann started work at the mines, and at age 16 became a lay preacher. At age 21 he enrolled at Shebbear College, North Devon, and began his ministry with the Bible Christian Church in 1879 at Southampton, followed by Lee, London, Portsmouth and Great Yarmouth. Other members of his family moved to America in 1878, and were anxious for Cann to join them, but he remained in England.

In 1884 Cann and W. F. James were selected for missionary service in Australia. He married the organist Mary de Peare, and travelled out to Adelaide aboard the SS Orient. His first posting was to Port Adelaide, then Mount Torrens in 1888. The Franklin Street church was next, followed by Mount Lofty and Goodwood. In 1902 the Bible Christian sect was integrated into the Methodist Church of Australasia and Cann was given charge of the Quorn church, followed by Brompton, then by Mount Gambier. Cann's other appointments include:

- president of the State Bible Christian Conference in 1897
- organizing secretary of his Church's Twentieth Century Fund in 1903
- president of the State Methodist Conference 1912–1913

He was known as a capable fundraiser: at each posting he materially advanced his church's finances. In 1911 he was appointed to the Adelaide Central Methodist Mission (associated with Maughan Church on Franklin Street), whose finances were in the doldrums. He broadened its focus to include philanthropic work, which he publicized effectively, attracting wealthy supporters. (Note: Cann was not superintendent of the Central Methodist Mission; that was Rev. Henry Howard; when he left the position was quietly dropped.) He worked there until 1927. He also helped to establish the Methodist Children's Homes at Magill. He retired in 1929.

In 1915 he took six months' leave and visited relatives in America.

He died at a private hospital in Henley Beach. Following a service at Maughan Church, his remains were buried at West Terrace Cemetery.

== Family ==
William Henry Cann married Mary Plowright Booth de Peare ( – 5 May 1939) on 7 August 1884; their children included:

- Bertha Florence Cann (1887– )
- Frank Archibald Cann (1890– )

They had a home at 649 Esplanade, Grange.
