= W. F. James =

William Francis James (1846 – 3 October 1924), commonly referred to as W. F. James or F. W. James, was a Methodist minister in South Australia, remembered for his work towards Methodist union in Australia.

== History ==
James was born in Truro, Cornwall, and educated at Chacewater National School and Trevarth School. He joined the Bible Christian Church at age 18 and preached his first sermon nine months later. He entered the ministry in 1868, serving in the Tavistock, Exeter and Northlew circuits and was ordained at Bideford in 1872. He met Eleanor Jane Swaish while he was stationed at Neath. In 1874 he was posted to Cardiff, where he hired the Swiss Hall to found a church, which steadily grew until he was able to erect a church building for nine denominations; then to St Austell. In 1884 James and W. H. Cann were selected for missionary service in Australia, and travelled out to Adelaide aboard the SS Orient. He subsequently worked at Kooringa; Young Street, Adelaide, where he saw the Bible Christians unite with the Methodist New Connexion. He subsequently ministered at churches in Goodwood; Orroroo; Port Germein; Glanville; Gladstone; Redruth in Burra; Yankalilla; Jamestown; and Gumeracha.

During his time in South Australia he filled various church functions:

- Secretary of Examining Committee
- Home Missionary Secretary
- China Mission Secretary and Treasurer
- Chairman of District (seven years)
- Conference Letterwriter (six years)
- Secretary of Wesley Bicentenary Movement in South Australia
- Secretary of Bible Christian Conference (twice)
- President of Bible Christian Conference
- member of the first General Conference of the United Methodist Church
- represented Australasian Methodism in five British Conferences

== Methodist union ==
Methodism was exported to Australia from Britain in five competing, or mutually antagonistic, denominations: Wesleyan, Primitive, the Bible Christian Church, the Free Churches and the New Connexion, of which the Wesleyan and Primitive churches were the most influential and powerful. There was never any differences in doctrine between these sects, merely in governance, and these largely disappeared with the passage of time. The laity of these churches were mostly in favor of amalgamation, while much of the clergy opposed any dismantling of the organisational structures. James was one exception and was determined to see a reduction in such duplication of effort.

In Canada in 1884 the Methodist Church of Canada (itself the product of several amalgamations) joined with the Methodist Episcopal Church, the Bible Christian Church, and the Primitive Methodist Church to form what was simply called the Methodist Church. James wrote a pamphlet Methodist Union in Canada, first published in 1892 by the Wesleyan Methodist Book Depot in Adelaide, outlining the benefits which could accrue to Australian Methodism by following a similar course. The pamphlet was picked up by other outlets, and created considerable interest. P. W. Bunting, the editor of The Contemporary Review, devoted a column in "Review of the Churches" to a review and summary of its contents, concluding with a statement that trifling differences should not prevent cohesion of Methodism in Britain. And at the Grindelwald Conference of September 1893, Rev. Dr (later Sir) Henry Lunn referred to James' pamphlet as providing ample evidence of the gains which could be made by such a union.

James followed up publication of the pamphlet with a lectures in five cities and three large towns in Australia and New Zealand, when required to travel by the church.

== Last years ==
He retired in 1912.

He died after a long illness, and following a service at Maughan Church, Franklin Street, his remains were buried at West Terrace Cemetery.

== Family ==
James married Eleanor Jane Swaish (Note: In some genealogy sites spelled "Swash") ( – 24 April 1922) of Bristol, in 1875. They had eight children, but only three survived childhood:

- Edwin Francis James ( – 1957) married Gertrude Adah Gosling on 24 May 1911
- H(enry) Garfield James (23 September 1883 – 1962) married Hilda Ruby Jane ?? in 1912
- John Alfred James (c. 1884 – 20 May 1905) at age 20

They had a home on Fisher Street, Malvern, Malvern.

== Publications ==
- Booklet on the life of Rev. Joseph Hancock, 1914

== Quote ==
THE Rev. F. W. James has rendered very important service in connection with Australian Methodist Union, and when the final consummation takes place his name will he remembered with gratitude.
