= Lewis O'Brien (Kaurna elder) =

Australian Aboriginal elder

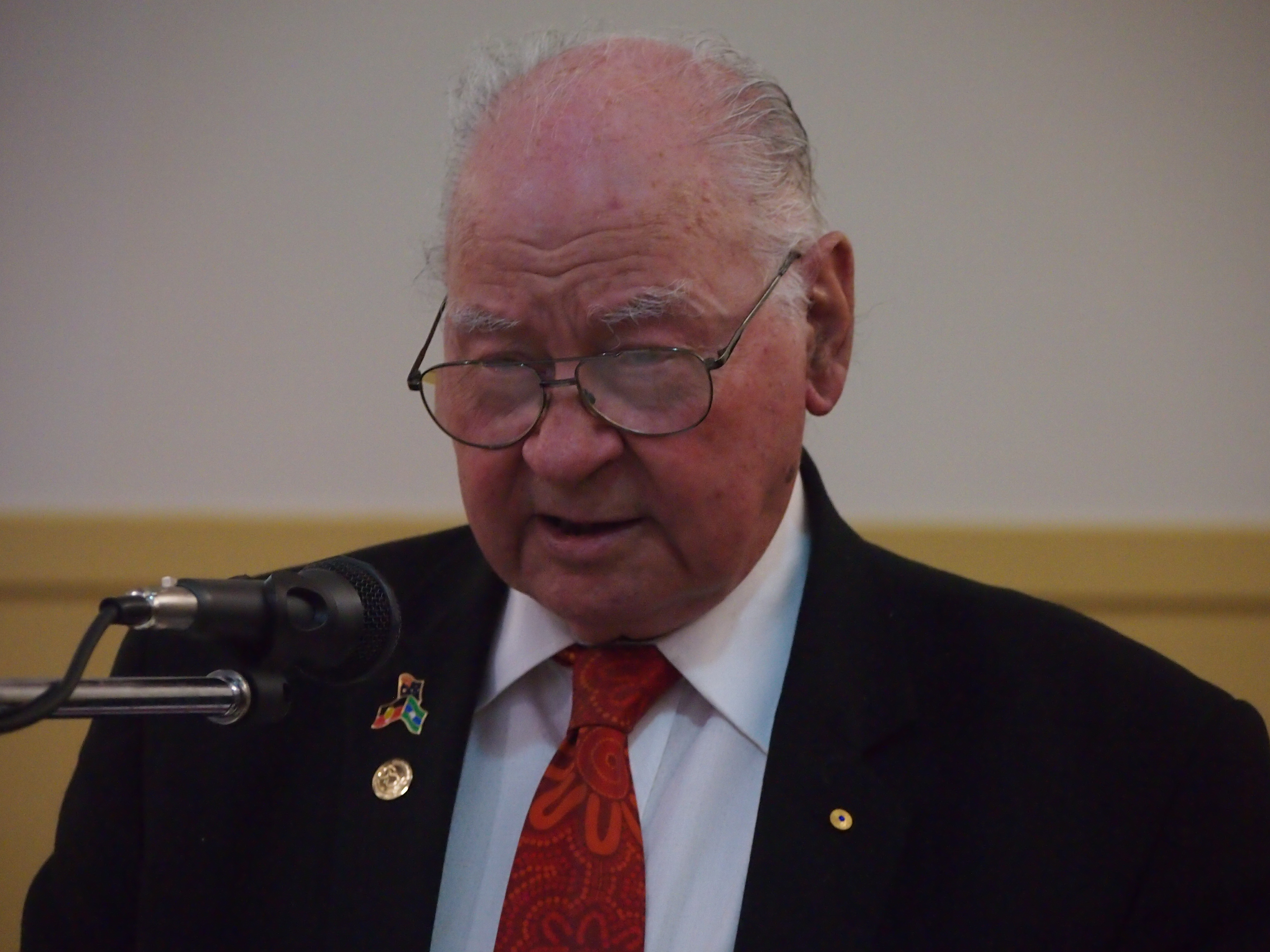
- Born: Lewis O'Brien; 25 March 1930 (age 95); Point Pearce, South Australia, Australia
- Other names: Yarlupurka or Yerloburka, Uncle Lewis
- Known for: Educator and leader
- Spouse: Pauline Sansbury

Lewis William Arthur O'Brien, known as Yarlupurka AO (born 25 March 1930), usually known as Uncle Lewis O'Brien, is an Aboriginal Australian elder of the Kaurna people.

== Early life and education ==
Lewis William Arthur O'Brien was born at Point Pearce Mission on Yorke Peninsula in South Australia on 25 March 1930. His father, who until late in life he had thought was an Irishman, and registered on his birth certificate as Ernest James Patrick Holmes O'Brien, was actually English. O'Brien's sister Merle found out that his birth name was actually Ernest Holmes Prince, and that his mother had changed his name after she became involved with an Irishman called Patrick O'Brien. Ernest Holmes/O'Brien came to South Australia as part of an immigrant boy apprentice scheme known as "South Australian Farm Apprenticeship Scheme" introduced by the premier Henry Barwell after World War I. Lewis never met his father, who left his mother before he was born, and returned to England in 1935, remarried and had another family there. His mother was Gladys Florence Simpson, granddaughter of Kudnarto, and he had an older brother, Lawrence.

Named after three maternal uncles, Lewis was largely raised by his great uncle and aunt, Lewis and May Adams. O'Brien was ill as a child and became a ward of the state at age 12. Until the age of 18, he lived in a number of foster homes and boys' homes. At the age of 18, around 1948, he went to live with his "Auntie Glad" (Gladys Elphick?) in Thebarton, an inner-western suburb of Adelaide. He later wrote that he had "blond hair and fair skin, who looked more Irish than Aboriginal. Even the kids on the mission referred to me as the white kid and used to throw stones at me for fun. And yet I grew up for a time with my Aboriginal grandparents as an Aboriginal kid".

He studied at Point Pearce, Ethelton Primary School and Payneham Primary School. He gained his Intermediate Certificate of education in 1946 from Le Fevre Boys Technical High School at Glanville, South Australia, overcoming extreme difficulties to do so, and gained an apprenticeship as a fitter and machinist with the South Australian Railways, completing in 1952.

While O'Brien was in his later school years and beginning his apprenticeship, he lived at Kumanka Boys' Hostel in Childers Terrace, North Adelaide. In 1948, there were 23 boys aged between 13 and 18 years resident at the hostel. O'Brien had fond memories of his stay there, and wrote in his memoir (pp. 130-) that the Lyndons (superintendent H. A. Lyndon and his wife, who was matron), were "excellent people", who helped him attain his education.

== Career ==
In the 1960s, O'Brien became involved with several movements advocating advancement for Aboriginal Australians, including the first Aboriginal Community Centre and the Aborigines' Advancement League of South Australia. His influence was felt on bodies such as the Aboriginal and Torres Strait Islander Commission; SA Jubilee committees; and various South Australian heritage, sport and recreation committees.

In 1977, he began working in schools, promoting Kaurna language and culture as well as supporting Indigenous students to complete education as a liaison officer for the South Australian Education Department.

In 2002, O'Brien, along with Aboriginal scholar Alitya Wallara Rigney and linguist Rob Amery, co-founded Kaurna Warra Pintyanthi (meaning "creating Kaurna language"), a group developing and promoting the recovery of the Kaurna language.

For over 30 years he worked in Aboriginal education, touching every sector. He has also done a great deal of research and scholarly work. He served as adjunct research fellow, David Unaipon College of Indigenous Education and Research at the University of South Australia, and is a Senior Elder on Campus at Flinders University.

== Other activities ==
O'Brien was one of several Kaurna elders involved in the co-design of the Yitpi Yartapuultiku (meaning "the Soul of Port Adelaide"), an Aboriginal cultural centre in Port Adelaide, which was officially opened on 1 June 2025. A naming ceremony for the centre was held on 16 August 2022, which included a Welcome to Country by Lewis O'Brien and a smoking ceremony by Michael O'Brien.

In 2025, O'Brien, in consultation with Aboriginal university staff and the University of South Australia's Purkarninthi Elders in Residence, chose the official Kaurna name for the new Adelaide University. On 18 July 2025, the university was assigned the Kaurna name Tirkangkaku, which means "place of learning". However, some controversy has arisen around the spelling of the name as well as lack of consultation with the wider Kaurna community.

== Name ==
In his 2007 memoir, O'Brien wrote that he sometimes used the name Warritya, meaning "second born male", but later took on Yerloburka, meaning "old man of the sea" (possibly related to his time in the merchant navy). In 2021 he adopted the preferred spelling Yarlupurka, following clarification of the Kaurna alphabet.

== Memoir ==
In 2007, O'Brien published his memoir And the clock struck thirteen: The life and thoughts of Kaurna Elder Uncle Lewis Yerloburka O'Brien as told to Mary-Anne Gale, published by Wakefield Press.

== Recognition and honours ==
- 1977: Aboriginal Elder of the Year
- 2001: Centenary Medal, "For service to the Aboriginal people of South Australia and in particular, Port Adelaide"
- 2009: Citizen of Humanity, awarded by the National Committee of Human Rights
- 2014: Officer of the Order of Australia, "For distinguished service to the Indigenous community of South Australia as an elder and educator, and to the promotion and protection of Indigenous culture and heritage", in the Queen's Birthday Honours List, 9 June 2014
- 2019: Winner of the Premier's NAIDOC Award, a South Australian award presented during NAIDOC Week
- 2021: The Law Building at the University of South Australia renamed the Lewis O'Brien/Yarlupurka Building, housing the Aboriginal Knowledges Centre
- 2024: The Adelaide Hills Council named a newly-developed recreation park at Hamilton Hill, Woodforde, the Lewis Yarlupurka O'Brien Reserve, in honour of the oldest living Kaurna elder

== Personal life ==
In 1957 O'Brien married Pauline Sansbury, and they had five sons and a daughter. Pauline grew up mostly in the city, but moved around the country a bit with her mother. Her father, Eddie Sansbury, had grown up in Point Pearce, and in later life lived with the O'Brien family.

O'Brien met his half-siblings, his father's second family, who had since migrated to Australia, in 2006.
