= Alitya Rigney =

Australian teacher and Aboriginal elder

Alitya Wallara Rigney AO, PSM
- Born: 27 November 1942; Point Pearce, South Australia, Australia
- Died: 13 May 2017 (aged 74); Adelaide, South Australia, Australia
- Other name: Alice Rigney
- Citizenship: Australian
- Education: University of South Australia
- Occupations: School teacher and principal
- Known for: reviving Kaurna language
- Spouse: Lester Rigney
- Children: 3

Alitya (Alice Dorothy) Wallara Rigney AO, PSM, née Richards, (27 November 1942 – 13 May 2017), also knowns as Aunty Alice, was an Australian Aboriginal scholar. She was a Kaurna elder and part of the team that revived the Kaurna language.

== Early life and education ==
Alitya (Alice Dorothy) Wallara Richards was born on 27 November 1942 at the Aboriginal Mission at Point Pearce, South Australia.

When she completed primary school, her teacher arranged for her to attend Unley High School in Adelaide as the local high schools would not accept Aboriginal children. She returned to Point Pearce following her schooling and training as a nurse, married and raised her family there.

She worked at the local kindergarten, then as a school support officer at Maitland Area School. She was eventually registered as a teacher, but for Point Pearce only. She then went to Adelaide and was the only Aboriginal student of 400 at what is now the de Lissa Institute of Early Childhood and Family Studies at the University of South Australia (UniSA).

== Career ==
Once she graduated, Rigney was a teacher at a primary school in the western suburbs of Adelaide. She became the first Aboriginal bureaucrat in the South Australian Department of Education. In the 1980s, she agitated for the creation of what became the Kura Yerlo Aboriginal Centre in Largs Bay and the Kaurna Plains School in Elizabeth. She became the first female Aboriginal principal of a primary school in Australia when she took up the post of principal at Kaurna Plains.

In 2002, along with Kaurna elder Lewis Yerloburka O'Brien and linguist Rob Amery, Rigney was a co-founder of Kaurna Warra Pintyanthi at the University of Adelaide, which observes and promote the development of the Kaurna language.

== Recognition ==
Rigney was awarded a Public Service Medal in 1991.

In 1998 she was awarded an honorary doctorate by the University of South Australia in recognition of her pioneering contribution to Aboriginal education.

In 2000 she was appointed a panel member of the S.A. Guardianship Board.

In 2017, Rigney was awarded the Gladys Elphick Perpetual Award, a lifetime award in the Gladys Elphick Awards.

Flags at UniSA were flown at half-mast following her death.

She was posthumously made an Officer of the Order of Australia in the 2018 Queen's Birthday Honours.

== Death, family, and legacy ==
Rigney died in Adelaide on 13 May 2017, a day after her husband Lester was buried on their birth country at Point Pearce.

Their three children all have roles in education: Lester-Irabinna Rigney is a professor of education at UniSA, Eileen Wanganeen is a teacher and education leader, and Tracey Ritchie is a principal Aboriginal consultant at the Department of Education and Child Development.

Kaurna Warra Pintyanthi continues its support of the Kaurna language.

As part of an arts project undertaken in 2026 by the Malinauskas state government honouring six prominent Indigenous South Australians, a statue of Rigney is to be erected in Adelaide.
