= Ivaritji =

Kaurna elder, Kaurna language speaker and weaver

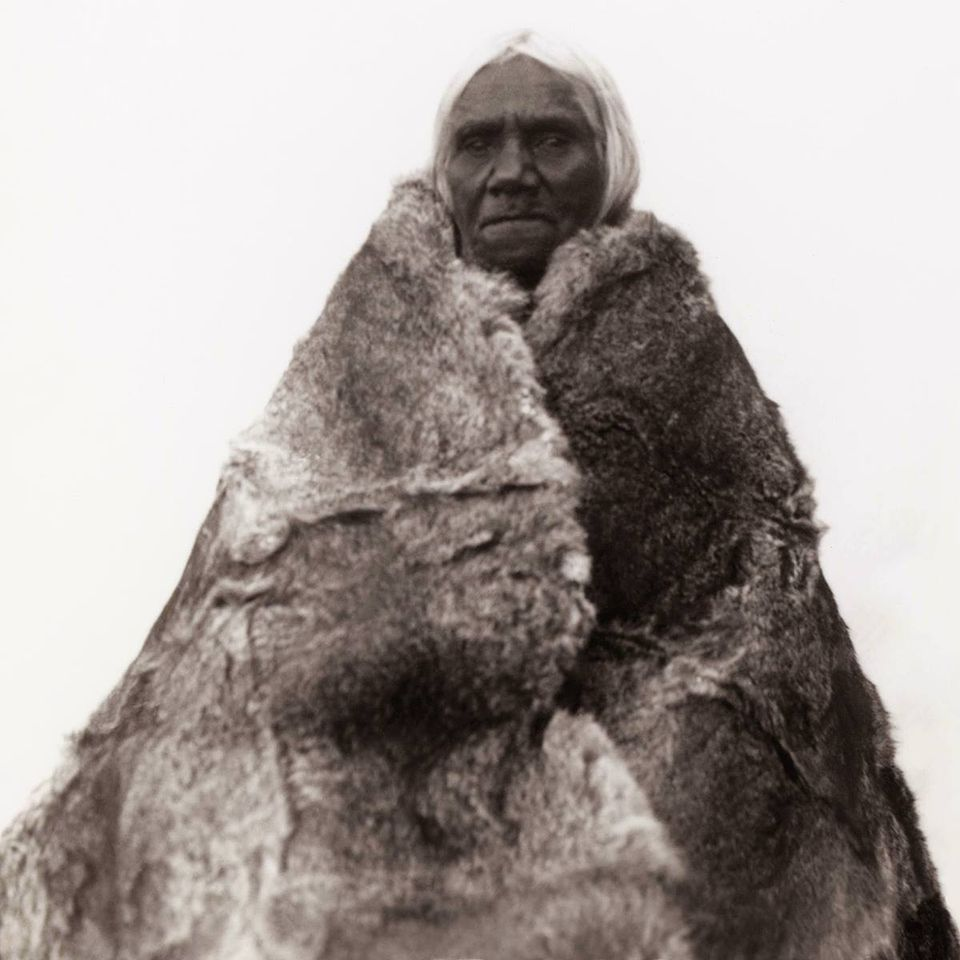
- Ivaritji wearing a wallaby-skin cloak, photographed by Norman Tindale in 1928
- Born: c. 1849; Port Adelaide, South Australia, Australia
- Died: 25 December 1929; Point Pearce, South Australia
- Other names: Amelia Taylor, Amelia Savage
- Occupations: Weaver, cook
- Known for: Kaurna elder; last native speaker of the Kaurna language

Ivaritji (c. 1849 – 25 December 1929), also spelt Iparrityi and other variations, and also known as Amelia Taylor and Amelia Savage, was an elder of the Kaurna tribe of Aboriginal Australians from the Adelaide Plains in South Australia. She was "almost certainly the last person of full Kaurna ancestry", and the last known speaker of the Kaurna language before its revival in the 1990s.

== Name ==
Ivaritji, commonly now spelt Iparrityi, and also variously spelt Iveritji, Ivarityi, Ivarity, Everity, and Everety, means "a gentle, misty rain" in the Kaurna language.

== Life ==
Ivaritji was born in Port Adelaide, South Australia, in the late 1840s to Ityamai-itpina, a leader of the Kaurna people, and his wife Tankaira of Clare, South Australia. Her childhood name was "Itja mau". She had a younger brother, Wima; an older brother, James Phillips; and several other siblings who died at a young age.

Locations in Ivaritji's life
1 Port Adelaide
2 Clarendon
3 Point McLeay Mission
4 Point Pearce Mission
5 Moonta

The Kaurna people, who may have numbered several thousand before European contact in the 1790s, were devastated by the introduced diseases and disruption to their way of life it brought, and few were left in the Adelaide area by the 1850s. When Adelaide became more populated during its early colonisation by European settlers, the tribe moved south to the Clarendon district, where its members led semi-nomadic lives in and around the southern Adelaide Hills, travelling between ration depots. Ivaritji's family became well-known in the region, with her parents referred to as "King Rodney" and "Queen Charlotte", and Ivaritji "Princess Amelia" by the local white settlers.

When both of her parents died in the early 1860s, Ivaritji was adopted by Thomas Daily—Clarendon schoolmaster and distributor of rations to Aboriginal people—and his wife. She stayed with them for several years, learning to read and write in English, before leaving to rejoin other Aboriginal people. By the late 19th century, Ivaritji and several members of the last remaining Kaurna had moved to the Point McLeay Mission. There, Ivaritji worked as a cook for the reverend George Taplin, and was for a time married to George Taylor (c. 1859 – 1915), an Aboriginal man from Kingston. After briefly working as a domestic servant in Norwood, she moved to the Point Pearce Mission Station, where she lived for many years.

On 20 December 1920, she married Charles John Savage (1853–1932), a man of African American descent, at the Holy Trinity Church in Adelaide. Charles was not permitted to live at the Point Pearce Mission with Ivaritji as he was not Aboriginal, so the couple moved to Moonta, where they lived in a small cottage on a section of an Aboriginal Reserve called 'the Crossroads'. The Chief Protector of Aborigines, William Garnet South, denied the couple the licence to the 18 acre reserve surrounding the cottage, instead allowing them only 1 acre and licensing the rest to a white farmer. Later, Ivaritji received £1 rent per month from a farmer who cropped the land. She supplemented Charles' pension and her rations by selling mats and baskets woven from discarded baling twine collected from neighbouring fields. She was a common sight in the Moonta township, where she spruiked her handicrafts to residents and tourists.

In 1929, she moved to a shared cottage on the Point Pearce reserve, as she had been struggling to support herself and was ineligible to receive an age pension due to being a "full-blooded" Aboriginal and thus considered a ward of the state under the laws of the time. She succumbed to pneumonia on Christmas Day 1929 at the Point Pearce hospital, leaving no direct descendants. At her death, she was referred to as the "last of her tribe", however numerous descendants—although not of full Kaurna heritage—of her paternal aunt and other Kaurna people were still alive and have descendants of their own alive today.

== Legacy ==
During the later years of her life, Ivaritji was interviewed and photographed by multiple people including Daisy Bates, John McConnell Black, Herbert Basedow and Norman Tindale. She shared many Kaurna words and place-names with them, as well as insights into aspects of Kaurna culture and the early colonial history of Adelaide. She was considered such an important source that the Anthropological Society of South Australia paid her expenses to travel from Moonta down to Adelaide to be interviewed in 1928. Her knowledge was later used in the revival of the Kaurna language in the 1990s.

Whitmore Square in the Adelaide city centre, a popular gathering place for Aboriginal people particularly in the 1930s and 1940s, was dual named in her honour in 2003. Development plans were approved in 2014 for a "Hotel Ivaritji" bordering the square, but the project was abandoned in 2021.

A display is dedicated to her in the South Australian Museum's Australian Aboriginal Cultures gallery.

In September 2026, a portrait of her was permanently installed in the Adelaide Town Hall Council Chamber, commissioned by the City of Adelaide as part of a series honouring prominent South Australian women. The portrait is a collaborative work between First Nations artists Thomas Readett and Carly Tarkari Dodd, combining Readett's monochromatic oil portrait with Dodd's woven frame, cast in bronze and inspired by Ivaritji's weaving.
