= Whitmore Square =

Square in Adelaide, South Australia

- Iparrityi
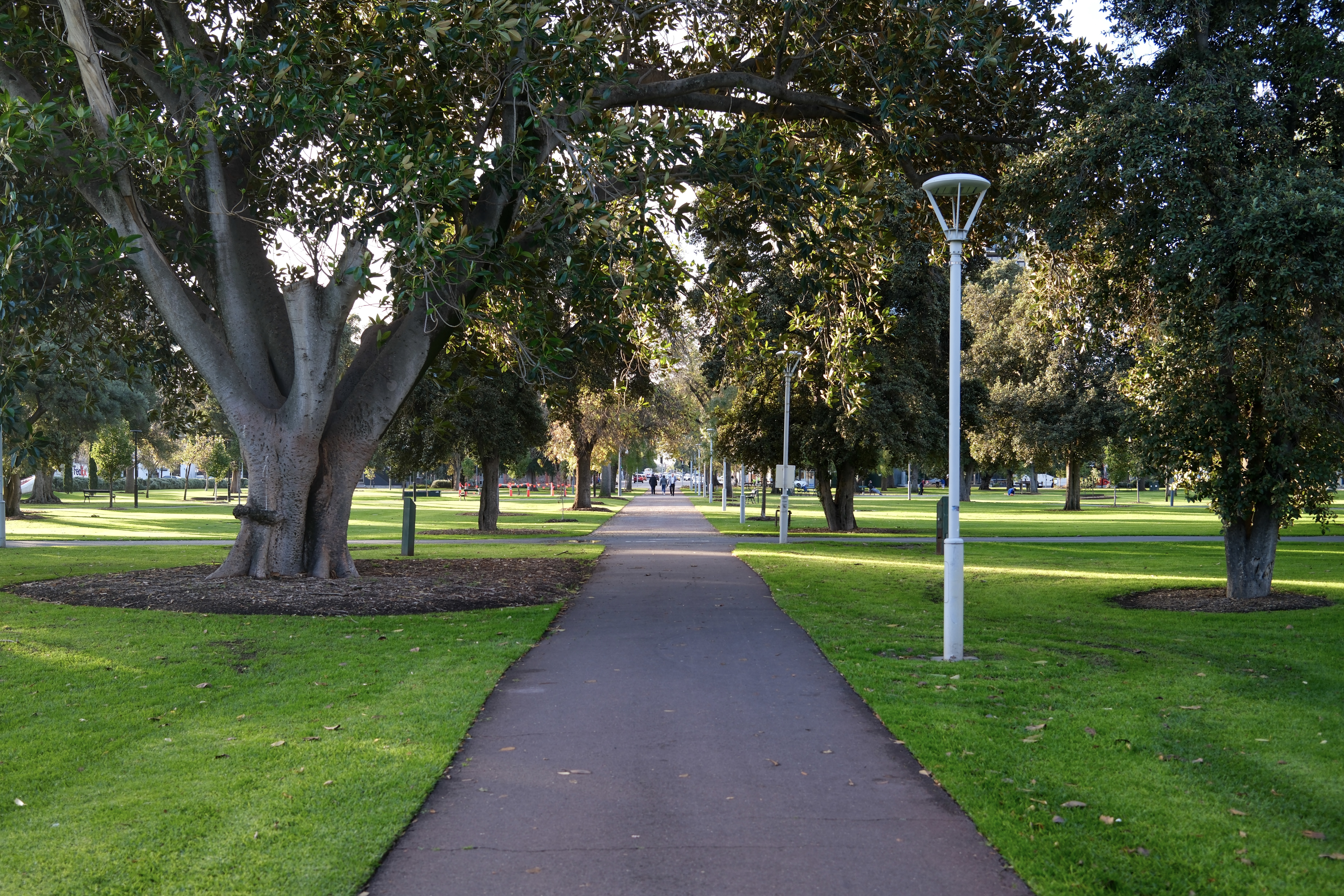
- Whitmore Square, looking north in 2026

- Location within City of Adelaide
- Namesake: William Wolryche-Whitmore
- Maintained by: City of Adelaide
- Location: Adelaide, South Australia, Australia
- Postal code: 5000
- Coordinates: 34.9328°S 138.5942°E
- North: Morphett Street
- East: Wright Street; Sturt Street
- South: Morphett Street
- West: Wright Street; Sturt Street

Construction
- Completed: 1837

Other
- Designer: William Light

Whitmore Square, also known as Iparrityi (formerly Ivaritji), is one of five public squares in the Adelaide city centre, South Australia. Occupying 2.4ha (24,000 m^{2}), it is located at the junction of Sturt and Morphett streets in the south-western quarter of the Adelaide city grid.

It is one of six squares designed by the founder of Adelaide, William Light, who was Surveyor-General at the time, in his 1837 plan of the City of Adelaide which spanned the River Torrens Valley, comprising the city centre (South Adelaide) and North Adelaide. The square was named in 1837 by the Street Naming Committee after William Wolryche-Whitmore, a British politician who had introduced the South Australia Act 1834 to the British House of Commons. In 2003, as part of the dual naming initiative of the Adelaide City Council, a second name, Ivaritji (later corrected to Iparrityi), was assigned in the Kaurna language of the original inhabitants. Iparrityi (c.1847—1929), also known as Amelia Taylor, was the last full-blood Kaurna person and last speaker of the Kaurna language.

== History ==
=== Pre-colonial history ===
The Adelaide area was inhabited long before European settlement in 1836 by one of the tribes which later came to be known as the Kaurna people, or Adelaide tribe.

=== As Whitmore Square ===
Whitmore Square is one of six squares in Colonel William Light's 1837 plan for the city of Adelaide and the only one which retains the configuration given to it by Light's plan. Light intended that the squares be used as public parks or village commons.

It was named by the Street Naming Committee on 23 May 1837 after William Wolryche Whitmore, a British politician who introduced the South Australia Act 1834, also known as the Foundation Act, to the British House of Commons. He was also one of the board of the South Australian Colonisation Commission set up by the Act.

After the removal of indigenous trees during the city's early colonial settlement, Whitmore Square was replanted in the 1850s and fenced to protect it from animals. The fences were finally removed in 1932. In the 1930s the square was a meeting place for people to discuss current affairs as well as a place for local children to play.

During World War II, air raid trenches were installed in the square and it was used for training of soldiers.

From 1909-1958 the north-west corner of the square was cut off by electric tram tracks.

=== Dual naming ===
In March 2003, as part of the City of Adelaide's dual naming project in association with the University of Adelaide's project, the square was assigned the name "Ivaritji", to commemorate the last full-blood Kaurna person and speaker of the language, a woman also known as Amelia Taylor, who was the daughter of Ityamai-itpina ("King Rodney"). The spelling of her name was later amended to Iparrityi. Iparrityi was born in the 1840s in Port Adelaide, and is sometimes referred to as "the last woman of the Adelaide Tribe". The name is a Kaurna word meaning "gentle, misty rain".

== 21st century ==
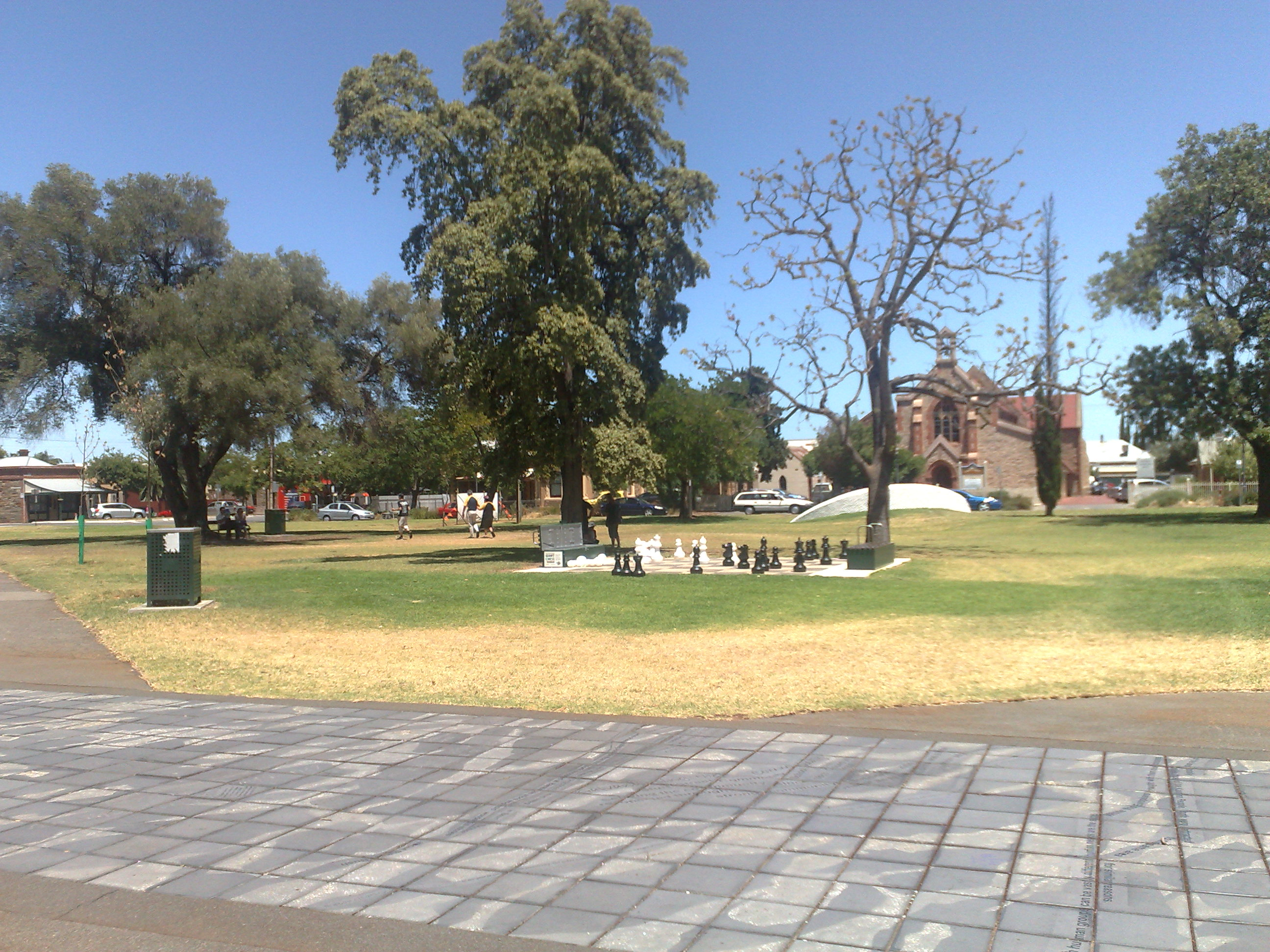
Oversize chess in the square.

By the 1990s the square had become known as a place for homeless people, public intoxication, drug use and prostitution, so seen as an unsafe place to be at night. The square was made a dry zone in 2001, and a nearby strip club converted into live music venue, the Whitmore Hotel. A giant chess board and a basketball half-court were installed in 2007 and 2009 respectively. The square become a more "community-orientated park" with a Community Verge Garden on the western side. Regular events started being held in the square, such as food truck fairs and film nights.

In December 2007, a public artwork, Voyagers, was unveiled on the western side of Whitmore Square. It pays homage to the Afghan cameleers who lived nearby and worshipped at the Central Adelaide Mosque when not working in the outback. As of 2018 the memorial did not have any signs explaining its purpose or the meaning of the scripts on the memorial.

In the 2010s the revival of the area continued, with several new cafes opening. In September 2018 the Whitmore Hotel reopened as Sparkke at the Whitmore, after local speciality brewers Sparkke Change Beverage Co bought the building.

The City of Adelaide, after community consultation, approved the Whitmore Square/Iparrityi Master Plan at the 11 June 2019 Council meeting. New lighting to the diagonal path across the square as well as feature tree lighting has already been installed.
