= Wright Street =

Street in Adelaide, South Australia

Wright Street South Australia
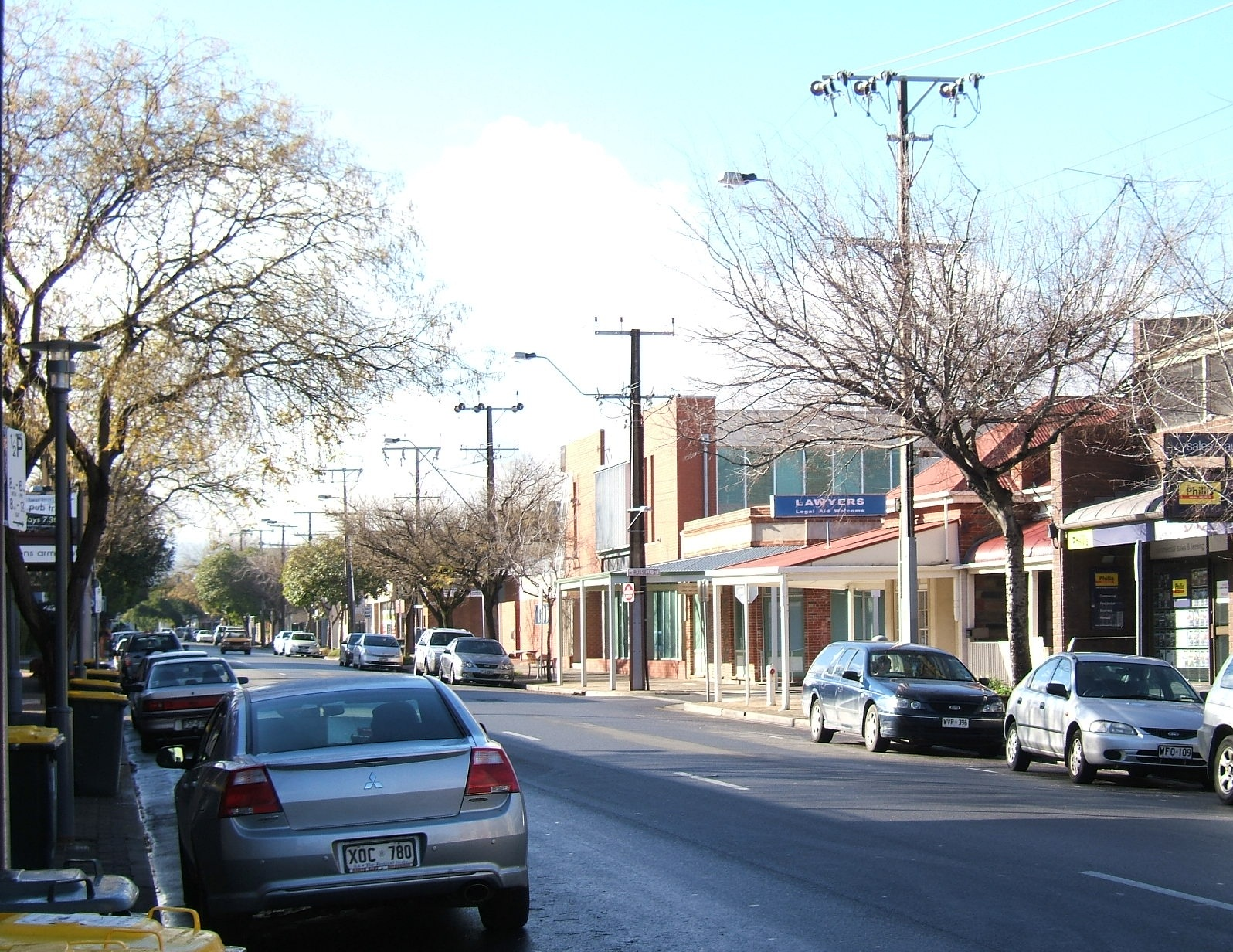
- Wright Street, looking east
- Coordinates: 34.932127°S 138.588073°E (West end); 34.931519°S 138.600161°E (East end)

General information
- Type: Street
- Location: Adelaide city centre
- Length: 1.1 km (0.7 mi)
- Opened: 1837

Major junctions
- West end: West Terrace; Adelaide
- Whitmore Square; Morphett Street
- East end: King William Street; Adelaide

Location(s)
- LGA(s): City of Adelaide

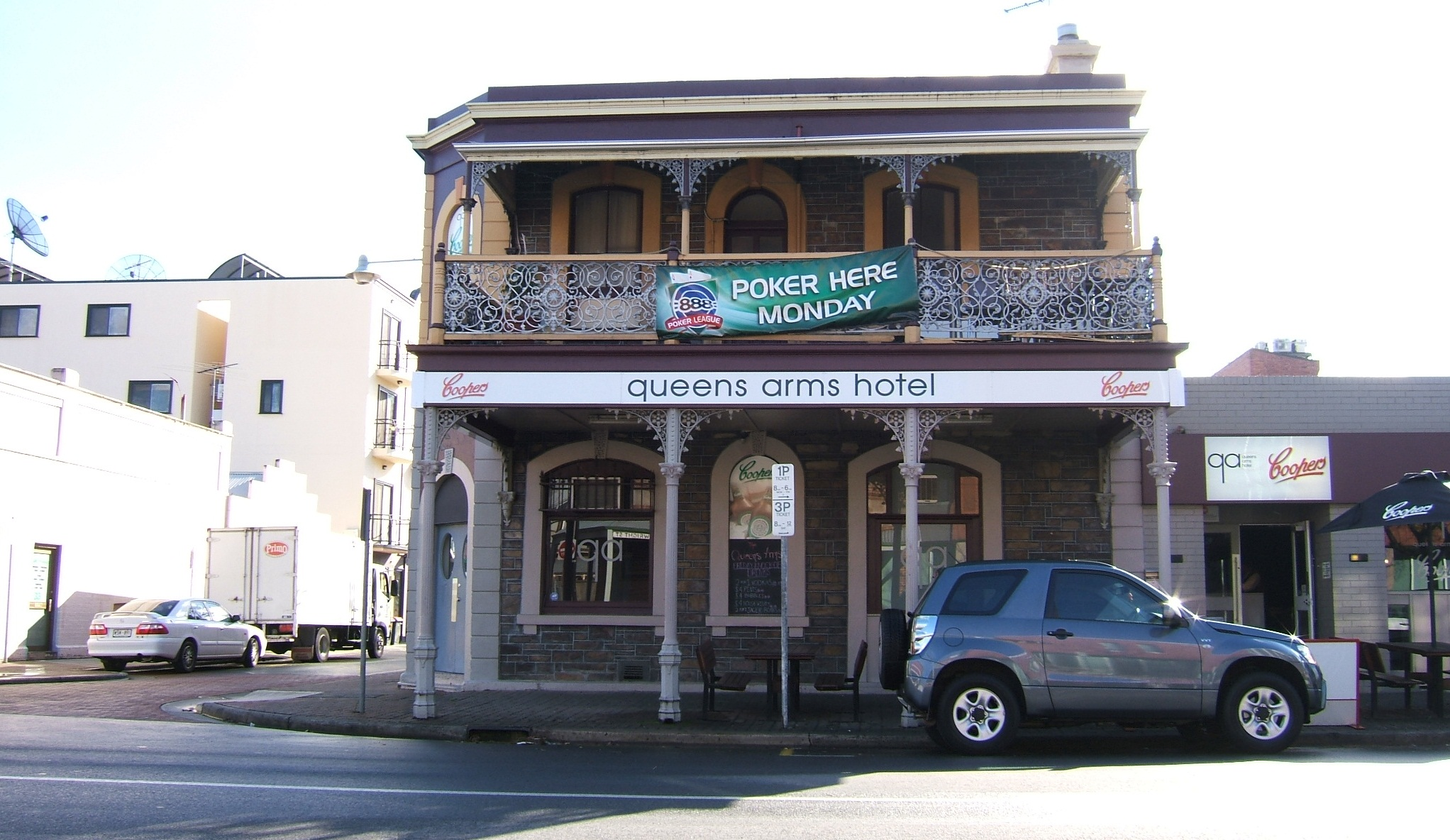
Queens Arms Hotel

Wright Street is an east–west street in the centre of Adelaide, South Australia. Among the buildings on Wright Street is the Juvenile Court.

The street was named after John Wright, a financier who was appointed a Colonial Commissioner of SA in May 1835.

== Junction list ==
Location	km	mi	Destinations	Notes
Adelaide city centre	0	0.0	West Terrace	Continues west as Wylde Road.
Adelaide city centre	0.09	0.056	Mary Street north	
Adelaide city centre	0.15	0.093	Maud Street north	
Adelaide city centre	0.16	0.099	White Lane south	No through road.
Adelaide city centre	0.25	0.16	Lowe Street north Chatham Street south	Lowe Street is a one-way Street – exit only. Chatham Street is a one-way Street – entry only.
Adelaide city centre	0.31	0.19	Claxton Street north	
Adelaide city centre	0.33	0.21	Gray Street south	One-way Street – exit only.
Adelaide city centre	0.37	0.23	Wisdom Court south	No through road.
Adelaide city centre	0.38	0.24	Millers Court north	No through road.
Adelaide city centre	0.4	0.25	George Court south	One-way Street – entry only.
Adelaide city centre	0.44	0.27	Selby Street north St Lukes Place south	St Lukes Place is a no through road.
Adelaide city centre	0.5– 0.62	0.31– 0.39	Whitmore Square east	northern section of Whitmore Square concurrent with Wright Street.
Adelaide city centre	0.52	0.32	Bartels Street north	One-way street – exit only.
Adelaide city centre	0.56	0.35	Morphett Street north	
Adelaide city centre	0.64	0.40	Wright Court north	
Adelaide city centre	0.74	0.46	Field Street north	One-way Street – exit only.
Adelaide city centre	0.75	0.47	Hobsons Place south	One-way Street – exit only.
Adelaide city centre	0.8	0.50	Compton Street north Russell Street south	Compton Street is a one-way Street – entry only. Russell Street is a one-way Street – exit only.
Adelaide city centre	0.87	0.54	Norman Street south	One-way Street – entry only.
Adelaide city centre	0.88	0.55	Market Street north	One-way Street – exit only.
Adelaide city centre	0.94	0.58	Coglin Street north Stamford Court south	Coglin Street is a one-way Street – entry only.
Adelaide city centre	1.01	0.63	Mill Street north Frew Street south	Frew Street is a one-way Street – entry only.
Adelaide city centre	1.12	0.70	King William Street north/south	Continues east as Carrington Street
Adelaide city centre	1.000 mi = 1.609 km; 1.000 km = 0.621 mi			
