= Sturt Street, Adelaide =

Street in Adelaide, South Australia

Sturt Street South Australia
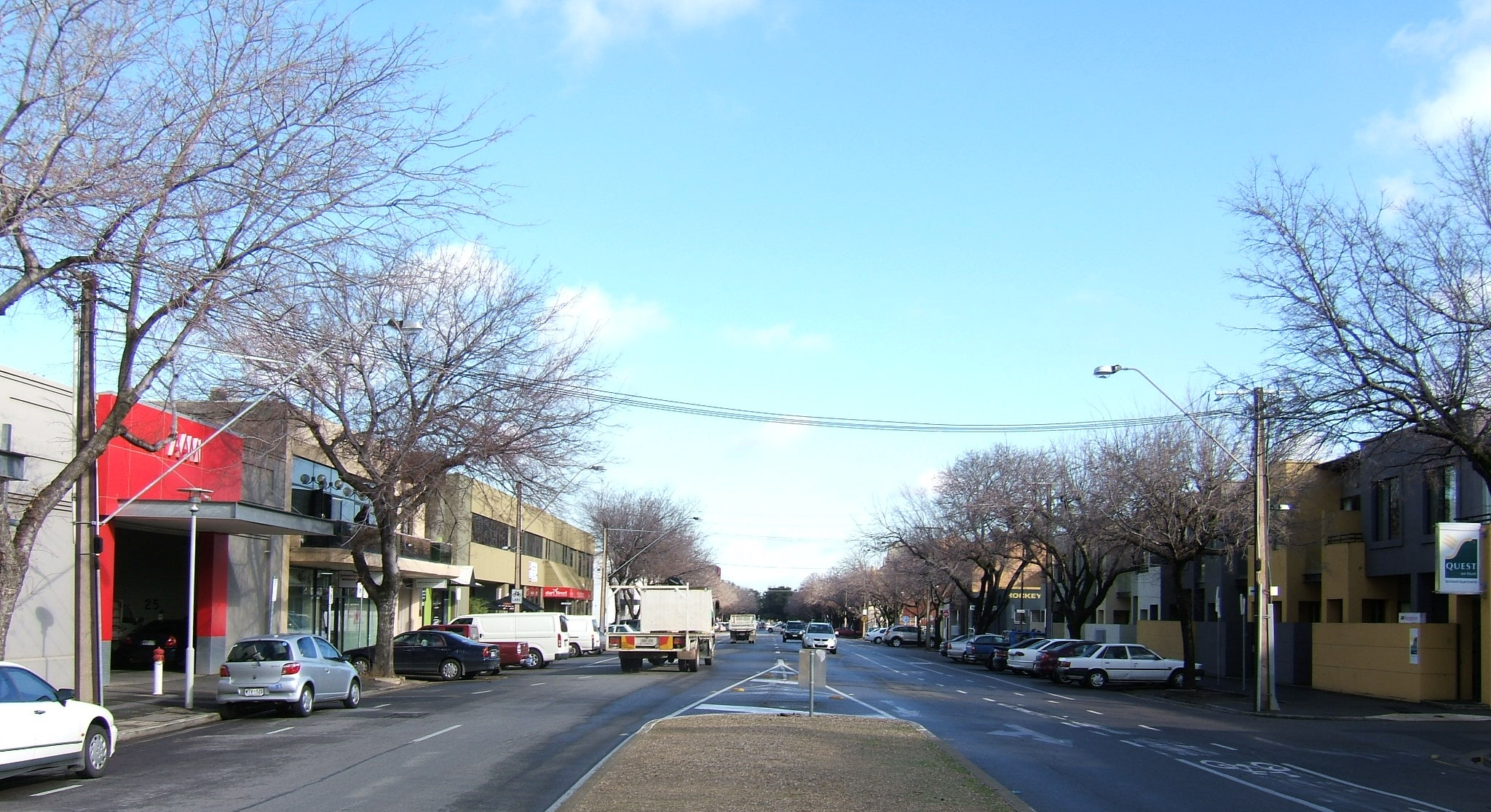
- Sturt Street, looking west from King William Street
- Coordinates: 34.933522°S 138.588307°E (West end); 34.932910°S 138.600264°E (East end)

General information
- Type: Street
- Location: Adelaide city centre
- Length: 1.1 km (0.7 mi)
- Opened: 1837

Major junctions
- West end: West Terrace; Adelaide
- Whitmore Square; Morphett Street
- East end: King William Street; Adelaide

Location(s)
- LGA(s): City of Adelaide

Sturt Street is a street in the south-western sector of the centre of Adelaide, South Australia. It runs east–west between West Terrace to King William Street, passing through Whitmore Square. After crossing King William Street, it continues as Halifax Street.

== History ==
The street is one of the many geographical locations in South Australia that are named after the explorer Charles Sturt.

There was once a length of tram line along the western end of Sturt Street, which on 18 September 1918 was extended via West Terrace and then Anzac Highway (then Bay Road) to Keswick. It was used to transport soldiers returned from World War I to the military hospital there.

There are also residential properties and small businesses, including boutiques and small galleries in the street.

== School ==
Sturt Street is home to the Sturt Street Community School, which was established in 1883 as one of four model schools in the CBD, called Sturt Street School.

Educationalist Milton Moss Maughan (1856–1921) was headmaster of the school from 1891 through to 1900, when it was referred as "Sturt-street Public School". The son of Rev. James Maughan, founder of Maughan Methodist Church on Franklin Street, Milton Maughan later became Director of Education.

Cinema entrepreneur Dan Clifford (1887–1942) attended the school.

== Historic properties ==
Former cameleer, turned healer and herbalist, Mahomet Allum lived and ran his business at number 181 in the first half of the 20th century. In 1992, a cafe specialising in Middle European Romani cuisine, Nanyeta's Gypsy Taverne was opened in the building by Marni Moroshovesti. It was also the South Australian office for Romani International Australia, until it was sold and converted into a residential dwelling.
