= Ted Schurmann =

Australian author (1917–2009)

- Born: 7 August 1917; Natimuk, Victoria, Australia
- Died: 1 February 2009 (aged 91); Surrey Hills, Victoria, Australia
- Spouse: Victoria May Riddles (m. 1944)
- Children: 2
- Relatives: Clamor Wilhelm Schürmann (great grandfather)

Ted Schurmann (1917–2009) was an Australian author. He was born Edwin Adolf Schurmann in 1917. As a writer he was also commonly known as E. A. Schurmann, and used other pen-names including Ben Titus, John Shurman, and S. A. Tedd.

== Personal life ==
Edwin Adolf 'Ted' Schurmann was born on 7 August 1917, at Natimuk, Victoria, Australia, the second son of Edwin Carl Schurmann (1886-1979, born at Natimuk) and Dorothea "Dora" Ida Thiele (1890-1980, born in Doncaster, Victoria). Schurmann was the great grandson of Lutheran pastor Clamor Wilhelm Schürmann (1815-1893), who had been an immigrant to Australia of German origin; he worked with South Australian Aboriginal people and wrote a dictionary of their words.

Ted Schurmann was living at Horsham, Victoria in 1944 when he became engaged to and later married Victoria May Riddles (originally from Western Australia). They had two children, Richard Paul Schurmann and Susan Katherine Schurmann, and moved to Melbourne, living at Ringwood from 1950-1984.

Schurmann died on 1 February 2009, at Surrey Hills, in Melbourne, after spending his retirement years at Wehla, near Inglewood.

== Career ==
Schurmann enlisted in the Royal Australian Air Force (RAAF) at Laverton, Victoria on 5 February 1940 at the age of 22, and held the role of a Warrant Officer. He was discharged from the RAAF on 6 December 1945.

=== Writing career ===
Schurmann began his authorial life writing short stories for publication in newspapers and magazines, including The Australian Women's Weekly and New Idea, from 1947-1952. His short stories, mainly for women readers, but also in KG Murray's men's magazines, reflect the tone and themes of the post-war era. At least 15 of these are available through the National Library of Australia's Trove online database.

Schurmann began producing children's books from 1967, when he first published No Trains on Sunday: A boyhood reminiscence. This was followed by Shop! Tales from a Country Store (1975), which consisted of numerous short stories set in Victoria's Wimmera district, bundled together as a novel. At least five more children's books followed, including Charlie Up a Gum Tree, which was shortlisted for the 1986 Children's Book of the Year awards, as well as three illustrated Australian bird identification books.

In 1987, the Lutheran Publishing House distributed Schurmann’s book describing the life and work of his great grandfather Clamor Wilhelm Schürmann and his interactions with Aboriginal people including as the Deputy Protector of Aborigines. The book is titled I'd Rather Dig Potatoes : Clamor Schurmann and the Aborigines of South Australia 1838-1853. It is based on research undertaken in South Australia and translations from the old German hand-written script of his great-grandfather.

In all, Schurmann wrote numerous short stories and children’s books, at least one novel, books about Australian bird-life and bird watching, and his description of C. W. Schürmann's life. His works were published between 1947 and 1992, at which time he was still writing stories for children.

== Bibliography ==
=== Select short stories ===
- “Telephone Piece” (Australian Women’s Weekly (AWW), 1947)
- “Fast Girl” (AWW, 1948)
- “Ring Off” (AWW, 1949)
- “I got burnt” (AWW, 1949)
- “Man’s Job” (AWW, 1949)
- “Mind if I use your telephone?” (AWW, 1949)
- “Mug Pug” (The World’s News, Sydney, 1949)
- “After Hours” (AWW, 1950)
- “New Formula” (AWW, 1950)
- “Sweet Thing” (AWW, 1951)
- “I’ll Walk Between You” (AWW, 1951)
- “The Night of the Party” (AWW, 1951)
- “Carry Your Case?” (AWW, 1951)
- “After the Party” (AWW, 1952)

=== Children's books ===
- No Trains on Sunday: A boyhood reminiscence (1967; 1985), illustrated by David Cox
- The Showie (1979)
- Charlie up a Gum (1986), illustrated by Bruce Treloar
- The Moon is Shining (1988)
- Boobook (1994), with Walter Stackpool
- The Big Horses (1993; 1996), illustrated by David Cox

=== Fiction ===
- Shop! Tales from a Country Store (1975; 1977)

=== Non-fiction ===
- Bird Watching in Australia (1977)
- Australian Water Birds (1982; 1989)
- Australian Bird Watcher's Diary (1984), illustrated by Wendy Jennings
- I'd Rather Dig Potatoes: Clamor Schurmann and the Aborigines of South Australia 1838-1853 (1987), by Ted Schurmann and Clamor W Schurmann
