= Clamor Wilhelm Schürmann =

German Lutheran missionary (1815–1893)

Clamor Wilhelm Schürmann (7 June 1815 – 3 March 1893) was a Lutheran missionary who emigrated to Australia and did fundamental pioneering work, together with his colleague Christian Gottlieb Teichelmann, on recording some Australian languages in South Australia.

== Life ==
Schürmann was born in the village of Schledehausen, near Osnabrück, Germany, and was soon bereaved of his parents, his father dying a year after his birth, and his mother when he was eleven. His elder brother had enrolled in Johannes Jaenicke's Berliner Missionswerk or Mission school in Berlin, and Schürmann followed in his footsteps after completing his elementary education, enrolling there in July 1832.

Teichelmann and Schürmann both enrolled in the Evangelical Lutheran Mission Society's seminary at Dresden (which later became the Leipzig Lutheran Mission) in 1836. Both men obtained their ordination as Lutheran pastors in early 1838, and travelled to South Australia on the Pestonjee Bomanjee later that year, arriving in Adelaide on 12 October. One of their fellow passengers happened to be George Gawler who was there to take up his appointment as the new Governor of South Australia.

== Missionary and linguistic work ==
Both Schürmann and Teichelmann believed that colonisation was a menace to Australian Aboriginal life and that to remedy its damaging impact, conversation had to be a two-way street, with due deference to the need to interact with native peoples in their own languages. Schürmann recounted that, while teaching the principles of Christianity he would draw analogies between the circumstances of Christ's life and those of the dispossessed Aboriginal people:-

I told them that... Jesus had been circumcised like the black men, had thought well, spoken and done well, then was hanged by his country people, but on the third day he went to heaven.

Schürmann and Teichelmann ran a school for Kaurna people at Piltawodli (located in the Adelaide Park Lands), and gained most of their knowledge of the Kaurna language from three respected elders: Mullawirraburka ("King John" / "Onkaparinga Jack"), Kadlitpinna ("Captain Jack") and Ityamaiitpinna ("King Rodney"). They recorded around about 3000 words, a sketch grammar, hundreds of phrases and sentences along with English translations, traditional songlines, and textual illustrations of differences among dialects. They also created Kaurna translations of six German hymns as well as the Ten Commandments.

== Legacy ==
Records compiled by Teichelmann and Schürmann in the 1840s have proven highly valuable in projects to reconstruct the language.

Schürmann's 1844 dictionary of Barngarla, containing both vocabulary and grammar and containing around 2000 words, has been used by the Barngarla community and University of Adelaide linguist Ghil'ad Zuckermann in the reclamation of the Barngarla language.

Australian author and minister Greg Lockwood is the great, great grandson of Schürmann, and compiled his diaries for publication in 2025.

== Family life ==
Clamor W Schürmann married Wilhemina Charlotte Maschmedt (known as 'Minna') in Encounter Bay, South Australia, on 11 February 1847. They had nine children.

One of their great grandsons was Australian author Ted Schurmann (Edwin A. Schurmann), who wrote children's stories, and books about Australian bird-life. He described the life of Clamor Schürmann and his interactions with Aboriginal people, in the book I'd rather dig potatoes : Clamor Schurmann and the Aborigines of South Australia 1838–1853, which is available to read online.

== Sources ==
- Amery, Rob; Gale, Mary-Anne (2014). "They came, they heard, they documented: the Dresden missionaries as lexicographers" (PDF). In Zuckermann, Ghil'ad; Miller, Julia; Morley, Jasmin (eds.). Endangered Words, Signs of Revival. Papers presented at the conference Australex 2013: Endangered Words, and Signs of Revival at the University of Adelaide, South Australia, 25 to 28 July 2013. Australian Association for Lexicography (Australex). pp. 1–19. ISBN 978-0-646-92900-2.
- Hill, Barry (2002). Broken Song: T G H Strehlow and Aboriginal Possession. Knopf-Random House. ISBN 1-74051-065-8.
- Kneebone, Heide (2005). "Schürmann, Clamor Wilhelm (1815–1893)". Australian Dictionary of Biography. Melbourne University Press.
- Kuchel, Rachel (2014). "Lutheranism in South Australia —its origins and contributions to South Australian life" (PDF). South Australian Geographical Journal. 113: 57–75. doi:10.21307/sagj-2016-007.
- Teichelmann, Christian Gottlieb; Schürmann, Clamor Wilhelm (1840). Outlines of a grammar, vocabulary, and phraseology of the Aboriginal language of South Australia spoken by the native in and for some distance around Adelaide (PDF). Adelaide.
