= Tauondi Aboriginal College =

College in Adelaide, Australia

Tauondi Aboriginal College, founded as the College of Aboriginal Education and also known as Tauondi Aboriginal Community College, is a non-profit independent Australian Aboriginal college in Port Adelaide, South Australia.

== History ==
The College of Aboriginal Education was founded by Gladys Elphick in 1973.

It was renamed to Tauondi Aboriginal College to honour the traditional owners of the Adelaide Plains, the Kaurna people. In Kaurna, tauondi means to "penetrate and break through”.

In 1996, this college, along with four others, founded the Federation of Independent Aboriginal Education Providers.

== Description ==
Tauondi Aboriginal College provides adult education for Aboriginal and Torres Strait Islander people, with the aim of "upholding Aboriginal cultures and identities in ways that respect Aboriginal lore and custom and the diversity of students' experiences and ambitions".

It teaches Aboriginal languages, including Kaurna and Ngarrindjeri. The first students of the first training course to be specially tailored to the teaching of Aboriginal languages and the sharing of language skills graduated in 2021.
