= Morphett Street =

Street in Adelaide, South Australia

Morphett Street South Australia
- Morphett Street looking south in 2026
- Coordinates: 34.921839°S 138.593336°E (North end); 34.935984°S 138.594418°E (South end)

General information
- Type: Street
- Location: Adelaide city centre
- Length: 1.6 km (1.0 mi)
- Opened: 1837

Major junctions
- North end: Montefiore Road; Adelaide
- North Terrace; Light Square; Currie Street; Grote Street; Whitmore Square; Sturt Street; South Terrace
- South end: Sir Lewis Cohen Drive; Adelaide

Location(s)
- LGA(s): City of Adelaide

Morphett Street is a main street in the west of the city centre of Adelaide, South Australia, parallel to King William Street and numbered from north to south. At its northern end it is part of the West End of Adelaide, a thriving cultural and entertainment precinct, with the Lion Arts Centre on the south-western corner of its junction with North Terrace.

== Location ==
The street runs from south to north between South Terrace and North Terrace, and passes around and through two of the five squares in the Adelaide city centre, Light Square and Whitmore Square. At Hindley Street it transforms into the start of the bridge which crosses North Terrace (at which point its name changes to Montefiore Road), the railway yards and the River Torrens.

== History ==
Morphett Street was named after Sir John Morphett, a prominent pioneer, whose votes at a meeting on 10 February 1837, (including numerous proxies), played an important role in confirming the site of Adelaide.

A small brewery known as Morphett Street Brewery operated on a premises near the northern end from 1859 to about 1873.

The southern half of Morphett Street, between Grote Street and South Terrace, was originally named Brown Street after John Brown, the first Immigration Officer of South Australia. Brown Street was subsumed into the expanded Morphett Street in August 1967. The Brown Street Memorial in Whitmore Square maintains the commemoration of John Brown.

From the late 1990s, a revitalisation of the "West End" of Adelaide was undertaken, which included the conversions of several old buildings (including the creation of the Lion Arts Centre in an old factory building) and the new University of South Australia's West End campus. The Mercury Cinema opened at no. 13 and the design studio JamFactory moved to a new purpose-built building at no. 19 in 1992.

In March 2021, a laneway that runs off Morphett Street and parallel to Hindley Street, near the former Cargo Club building (since demolished), was renamed Sia Furler Lane, after Adelaide-born singer-songwriter Sia. A large mural titled She Imagined Buttons was painted on a wall nearby by local artist Jasmine Crisp, which is intended to reflect the response of a fan to Sia's 2011 performance in Adelaide.

== Notable buildings ==
Trinity Church Adelaide, established in 1836 as Holy Trinity Church in the earliest days of the colony of South Australia and listed on the now-defunct Register of the National Estate in 1980, is on the north-eastern corner with North Terrace.

The Lion Arts Centre is on the other side of the bridge, on the north-western corner, next door to the Mercury Cinema and JamFactory.

== Southern and northern continuations ==
Morphett Street continues north of North Terrace as Montefiore Road, and south of South Terrace as Sir Lewis Cowen Avenue. Montefiore Road and Hill were named after Jacob Barrow Montefiore, a Colonising Commissioner who was a cousin of the British philanthropist, Moses Montefiore. Lewis Cohen served on the Adelaide City Council for 30 years, including several terms as Mayor and Lord Mayor.
