= Kaurna Plains School =

Coordinates: 34.7235°S 138.6665°E

Location
- 83 Ridley Road; Elizabeth, South Australia

Information
- Type: Public
- Motto: Cooperation, Organisation, Respect, Kindness, Acceptance (CORKA)
- Established: 1986–1987; 39 years ago
- Principal: Angela Walkuski
- Grades: Reception–13
- Enrolment: 122 (2021)
- Website: www.kaurnaas.sa.edu.au

Kaurna Plains School is an Aboriginal school in Elizabeth, a northern suburb of Adelaide, South Australia. It includes the teaching of the Kaurna language in its curriculum.

== History and description ==
Established in 1986 and taking classes from 1987, it caters predominantly for Aboriginal students from Reception to Year 13. Its aim is to provide Aboriginal children with an academically focused curriculum which respects Aboriginal culture. The school was created as a response to the "widespread educational disadvantage identified within the Northern Adelaide region resulting in Aboriginal learners not meeting National and State educational benchmarks".

== People ==
Principals have included Alitya Rigney, who introduced the teaching of the Kaurna language at the school and was the first Aboriginal woman to become a school principal in Australia.
