= Christian Gottlieb Teichelmann =

Prussian Lutheran missionary (1807–1888)

Christian Gottlieb Teichelmann (15 December 1807 – 31 May 1888), also spelt Christian Gottlob Teichelmann, was a Lutheran missionary who worked among Australian Aboriginal people in South Australia. He was a pioneer in describing the Kaurna language, after his work begun at the Piltawodli Native Location in Adelaide, with fellow-missionary Clamor Wilhelm Schürmann.

== Life ==
Teichelmann came from humble origins. He was born in the Saxon village of Dahme (part of Prussia from 1815), the son of a master clothmaker, and, after an early schooling, was apprenticed as a carpenter's assistant at the age of 14. After several years practising his trade in Saxony and Prussia, he took private lesson to qualify for entry into the Royal Building Trades School in Berlin, where he studied from 1830 to 1831. During this period Teichelmann, after mixing with students who had missionary contacts, enrolled in Jaenicke's Mission school in 1831, where Clamor Wilhelm Schürmann was a fellow-student. There he received a thorough education in Latin, Greek, Hebrew and English, together with theological and historical studies.

Teichelmann and Schürmann then enrolled in the Evangelical Lutheran Mission Society's seminary at Dresden in 1836, obtaining their ordination as Lutheran pastors in early 1838. Later that year they travelled to Australia on the Pestonjee Bomanjee, arriving in Adelaide on 12 October. One of their fellow passengers happened to be George Gawler who was there to take up his appointment as the new Governor of South Australia.

== Missionary and language work ==
Notable problems arose when the evangelical Gawler, an evangelical enthusiast himself who had proven supportive of their work, was replaced by George Grey, who insisted rather that Aboriginal people be instructed only in English, preferably in schools run by the state. The German missionaries at the time were the only ones thoroughly at home in native languages and gifted with a practical empathy for the customs and modes of Aboriginal life.

Schürmann and Teichelmann ran a school for Kaurna people at Piltawodli (located in the Adelaide Park Lands), and gained most of their knowledge of the Kaurna language from three respected elders: Mullawirraburka ("King John" / "Onkaparinga Jack"), Kadlitpinna ("Captain Jack") and Ityamaiitpinna ("[King Rodney"). They recorded around about 3000 words, a sketch grammar, hundreds of phrases and sentences along with English translations, traditional songlines, and textual illustrations of differences among dialects. They also created Kaurna translations of six German hymns as well as the Ten Commandments. The records compiled by them have proven highly valuable in projects to reconstruct the language.

== Family ==
Teichelmann married Margaret Nicholson on 25 December 1843, and they had fifteen children together. One son, Ebenezer Teichelmann, became a surgeon, mountaineer and conservationist in New Zealand.

== Sources ==
- Amery, Rob; Gale, Mary-Anne (2014). "They came, they heard, they documented: the Dresden missionaries as lexicographers" (PDF). In Zuckermann, Ghil'ad; Miller, Julia; Morley, Jasmin (eds.). Endangered Words, Signs of Revival. Papers presented at the conference Australex 2013: Endangered Words, and Signs of Revival at the University of Adelaide, South Australia, 25 to 28 July 2013. Australian Association for Lexicography (Australex). pp. 1–19. ISBN 978-0-646-92900-2.
- Hill, Barry (2002). Broken Song: T. G. H. Strehlow and Aboriginal Possession. Knopf-Random House. ISBN 1-74051-065-8.
- Kneebone, Heide (2005). "Teichelmann, Christian Gottlieb (1807–1888)". Australian Dictionary of Biography. Supplement. Melbourne University Press.
- Kuchel, Rachel (2014). "Lutheranism in South Australia —its origins and contributions to South Australian life" (PDF). South Australian Geographical Journal. 113: 57–75. doi:10.21307/sagj-2016-007.
- Teichelmann, Christian Gottlieb; Schürmann, Clamor Wilhelm (1840). Outlines of a grammar, vocabulary, and phraseology of the Aboriginal language of South Australia spoken by the native in and for some distance around Adelaide (PDF). Adelaide.
