= James Maughan =

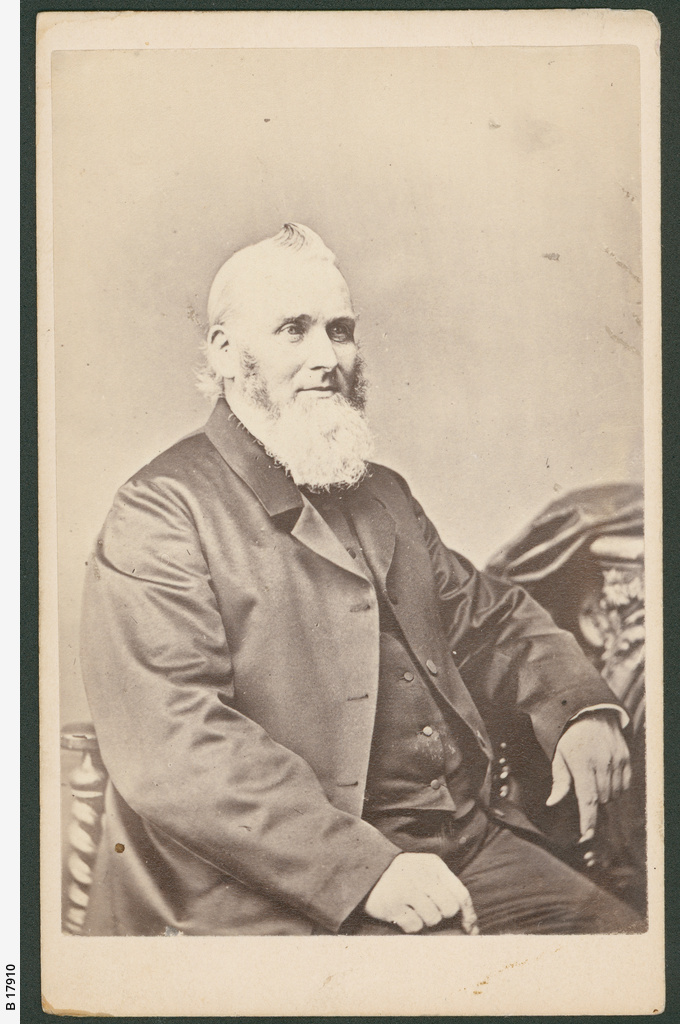
- Born: October 1826; Seaton Burn, near Newcastle-upon-Tyne
- Died: 8 March 1871 (aged 44); Adelaide, South Australia
- Spouse: Catherine Moss (1833–1911)

Rev. James Maughan (October 1826 – 8 March 1871) was a Methodist minister in Adelaide, South Australia. His name was commemorated in the Maughan Church, Franklin Street, which has since been demolished.

== Biography ==
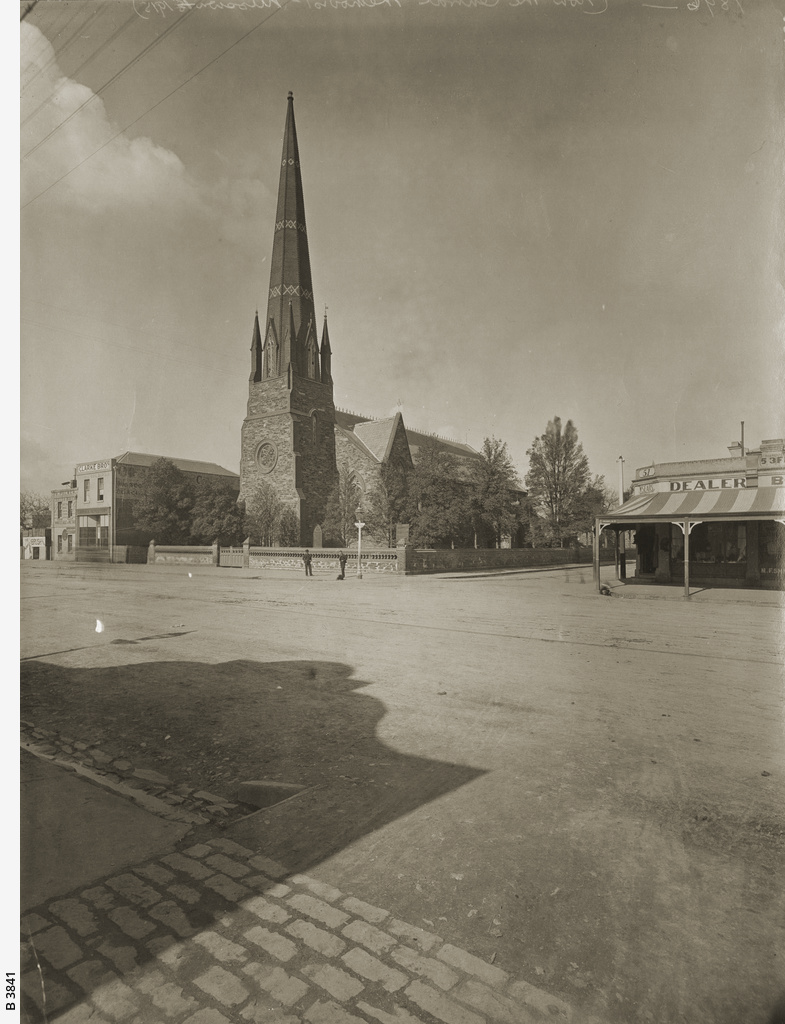
Maughan Church, Adelaide photograph by Ernest Gall, 1896

James Maughan was born at Seaton Burn, near Newcastle-upon-Tyne and from an early age attended the Methodist New Connexion Sunday-school. He was a brilliant speaker, and at age 20 was called on to replace the ailing Rev. J. Hilton. In 1848 he was appointed minister on probation, preaching in the Bradford circuit. In 1849 he became minister at Macclesfield, followed by a year in Derby, another year in Dewsbury, two years in London, two years in Leeds, and three each in Dudley and Bristol.

He was sent to Melbourne, Victoria aboard the Blanche Moore to serve as a New Connexion missionary, arriving in August 1862. He visited Adelaide in November 1862, and found he could be more usefully employed there. Within weeks the congregation had swollen to such an extent they had to move from the West Adelaide Assembly Rooms ("Hillier's Rooms") in Hindley Street to White's Rooms on King William Street, then built a manse on Whitmore Square and a new Church on Franklin Street. In April 1869 he left for England, in company with Samuel Way, in the hope of regaining his failing health, then returned without improvement aboard the Yatala and was back in Adelaide in October 1870, but never returned to his former level of activity. He died on the seventeenth anniversary of his marriage.

His widow was noted for her involvement with the Women's Christian Temperance Union and her work with women prisoners of Adelaide Gaol, in company with Lady Colton and Sister Grace.

== Recognition ==
The Methodist New Connection Church on Franklin Street, in 1922 the Central Mission, was renamed Maughan Church in recognition of his pioneering work. A church of the same name, built in 1965, was demolished in 2016.

== Family ==
He married Catherine Moss (1833 – 2 August 1911) on 8 March 1854. They had four children:

- Minnietta Maughan ( – 17 February 1947) married Rev. Thomas McNeil (c. 1844 – 22 April 1922) on 6 April 1912. She was a teacher at the Advanced School for Girls, then Adelaide High School.
- Marinus Maughan (1864 – 18 September 1918) married Emma Mary Ann Possingham on 6 June 1889; lived at "Ingleside", Houghton, South Australia
- Milton Moss Maughan (2 November 1856 – 17 December 1921) married Eliza (or Elsie) Ann Torr (16 November 1855 – 1935) on 6 August 1880. He became Director of Education; she was a sister of William George Torr. They had five children, of whom three sons survived him.
- Melville Maughan (1868 – 17 September 1920) lived at Currie Street, then Whitmore Square, Adelaide
