= Mount Teichelmann =

Mountain in the Southern Alps, New Zealand

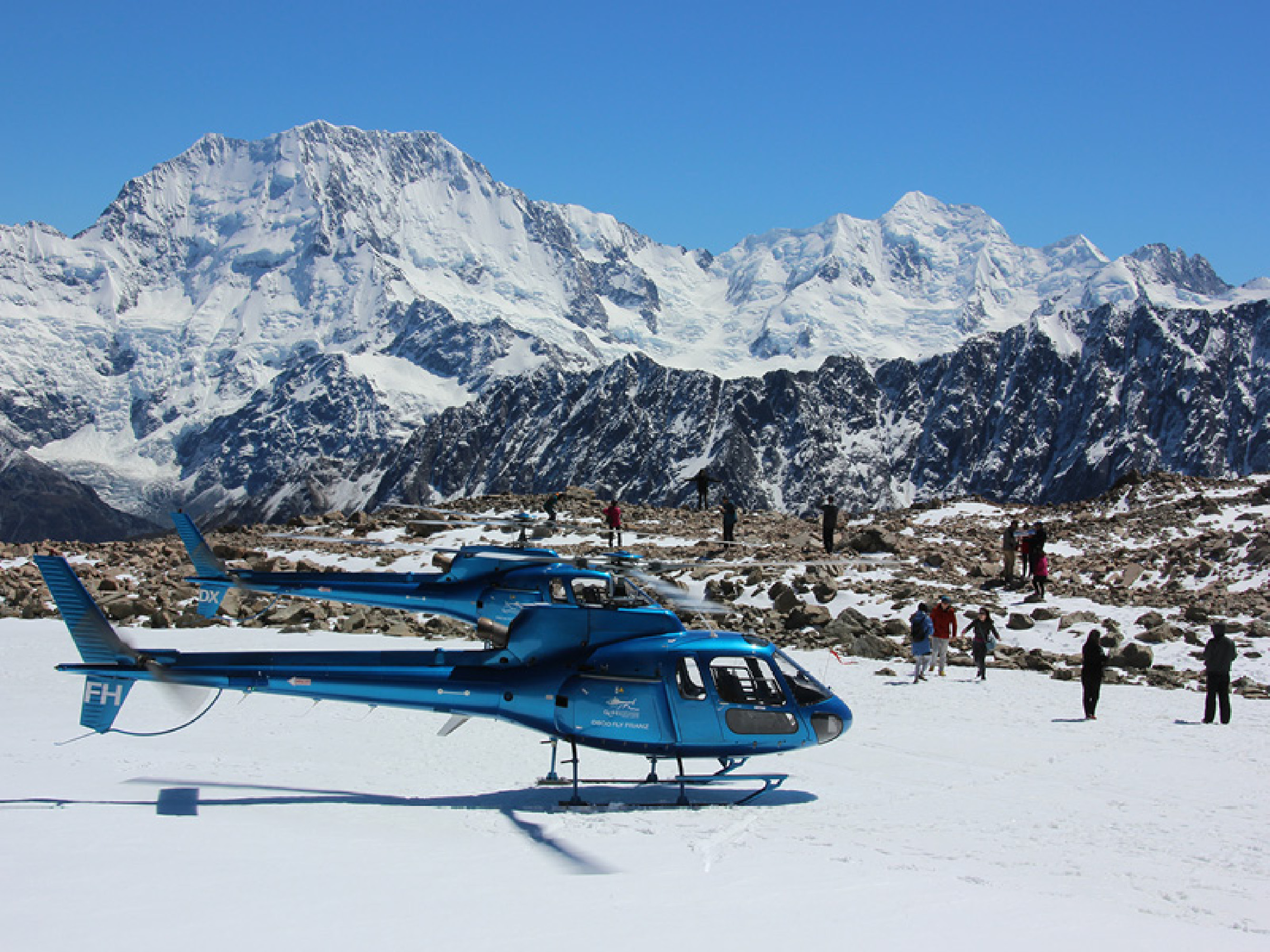

Highest point
- Elevation: 3,144 m (10,315 ft)
- Isolation: 0.21 km (0.13 mi)
- Coordinates: 43°34′26″S 170°08′49″E

Naming
- Etymology: Ebenezer Teichelmann
- Native name: Rarangiroa

Geography
- Location within New Zealand
- Location: West Coast, New Zealand
- Parent range: Southern Alps

Mount Teichelmann (Rarangiroa) is a mountain summit located in the Southern Alps, in the Westland District of New Zealand. The mountain was named after the Australian surgeon and mountaineer Ebenezer Teichelmann.

== Description ==
Mount Teichelmann lies on the junction of the Balfour Range and the main range of Southern Alps, between the two highest peaks of the country, 3,724 m (12,218 ft) high Aoraki / Mount Cook and the 3,497 m (11,473 ft) high Mount Tasman. Linda Glacier is found on the southeastern flanks of the peak.

The peak is located at the border between Westland Tai Poutini National Park and Aoraki / Mount Cook National Park.

== Geology ==
Mount Teichelmann is primarily formed by uplifted sandstone, siltstone and mudstone, which was deposited between 201 and 253 million years ago.
