= Kaurna language =

Australian Aboriginal language

Kaurna
- Kaurna Warra
- Native to: Australia
- Region: South Australia
- Ethnicity: Kaurna
- Extinct: 25 December 1929, with the death of Ivaritji
- Revival: 1980s
- Language family: Pama-Nyungan: Thura-Yura; Kadli?; Kaurna

Language codes
- ISO 639-3: zku
- Glottolog: kaur1267
- AIATSIS: L3
- ELP: Kaurna
- Kaurna is classified as Critically Endangered by the UNESCO Atlas of the World's Languages in Danger.

Kaurna (/ˈɡɑːrnə/ or /ˈɡaʊnə/) is a Pama-Nyungan language historically spoken by the Kaurna peoples of the Adelaide Plains of South Australia. The Kaurna peoples are made up of various tribal clan groups, each with their own parnkarra district of land and local dialect. These dialects were historically spoken in the area bounded by Crystal Brook and Clare in the north, Cape Jervis in the south, and just over the Mount Lofty Ranges. Kaurna ceased to be spoken on an everyday basis in the 19th century and the last known native speaker, Ivaritji, died in 1929. Language revival efforts began in the 1980s, with the language now frequently used for ceremonial purposes, such as dual naming and welcome to country ceremonies.

== Classification ==
Robert M. W. Dixon (2002) classified Kaurna as a dialect of the Kadli language, along with Ngadjuri, Narungga, and Nukunu, and "Nantuwara", with kadli meaning "dog" in these varieties. However this name has not gained wide acceptance and is not recorded as a language in the AIATSIS AUSTLANG database.

Luise Hercus and J. Simpson (2002, 2006) classify Kaurna as within the subgroup of Thura-Yura languages.

== Name ==
The name "Kaurna" was not widely used until popularised by South Australian Museum Ethnographer Norman B. Tindale in the 1920s. The term "Kaurna" was first recorded by Missionary Surgeon William Wyatt (1879: 24) for "Encounter Bay Bob's Tribe". At the same time he recorded "Meeyurna" for "Onkaparinga Jack's Tribe".

Kaurna most likely derives from kornar, the word for "people" in the neighbouring Ramindjeri/Ngarrindjeri language. Mullawirraburka (Onkaparinga Jack, also known to the colonists as "King John"), was one of Lutheran missionaries Christian Teichelmann and Clamor Schürmann's main sources. Encounter Bay Bob, as his name suggests, came from Encounter Bay (Victor Harbor) and was most likely a fully initiated elder Ramindjeri man. Thus "Meyunna" is probably the group's endonym, however, they are now universally known as the Kaurna people.

=== Name variants ===
Library of Congress Subject Headings gives the following variant names (all followed by "language"): Adelaide; Coorna; Gauna; Gaurna; Gawurna; Kaura; Kawurna.

The Endangered Languages Project names the following alternatives: Kaura, Coorna, Koornawarra, Nganawara, Kurumidlanta, Milipitingara, Widninga, Winnaynie, Meyu, Winaini, Winnay-nie, Wakanuwan, Adelaide tribe, Warra, Warrah, Karnuwarra, Jaitjawar:a, Padnaindi, Padnayndie, Medaindi, Medain-die, Merildekald, Merelde, Gaurna, Nantuwara, Nantuwaru, Meljurna, Midlanta.

== History ==
=== Early records ===
French explorer Joseph Paul Gaimard recorded the first wordlist of the language, containing 168 words, after calling in at the Gulf St Vincent en route to Western Australia in 1826, before the colony of South Australia had been established. His sources were listed as Harry and Sally.

Schürmann and Teichelmann, who ran a school at Piltawodli, gained most of their knowledge of the language from three respected elders: Mullawirraburka ("King John" / "Onkaparinga Jack"), Kadlitpinna ("Captain Jack") and Ityamaiitpinna ("[King Rodney"). The two missionaries recorded around about 3000 words, a sketch grammar, hundreds of phrases and sentences along with English translations, traditional songlines, and textual illustrations of differences among dialects. They also created Kaurna translations of six German hymns as well as the Ten Commandments.

Other Europeans such as William Wyatt, William Williams, William Cawthorne and Matthew Moorhouse were interested in the people and learnt some of the language; several wrote about the "Adelaide Tribe" in their memoirs. Williams created a list of 377 Kaurna words, published in the Southern Australian on 15 May 1839 and republished in The South Australian Colonist on 14 July 1840. His work entitled A vocabulary of the language of the Aborigines of the Adelaide district, and other friendly tribes, of the Province of South Australia was self-published in 1839, to be sold in London as well as Adelaide. Others who recorded some knowledge of Kaurna included James Cronk, Walter Bromley, George Augustus Robinson, Hermann Koeler, Louis Piesse, Edward Stephens and James Chittleborough.

Kaurna Pidgin
- Native to: Australia
- Era: 19th century
- Language family: Kaurna–based pidgin

Language codes
- ISO 639-3: None (mis)
- Glottolog: pidg1255
- ELP: Kaurna

In the 19th century, there was also a Kaurna-based pidgin used as a contact language.

The former range of the language was mapped by Norman Tindale and later Robert Amery, and is managed by the Kaurna people.

=== Language revival ===
Kaurna had not been spoken as a native language since the Kaurna people had been pushed out of their traditional lands since the colonisation of South Australia in the 19th century, with the population in decline due to various factors. Ivaritji (c.1849–1929) was the last known speaker, but it was probably last only widely spoken in the early 1860s.

In the 1980s, Kaurna people who had moved back into the Adelaide Plains area began to learn and use their language again. Robert Amery, head of Linguistics at the University of Adelaide, who has devoted much of his life and career to Indigenous languages, in particular Kaurna: "After more than 25 years of painstaking effort, there are now several Kaurna people who can conduct a conversation in Kaurna without resorting to English too quickly, and we are seeing the first semi-native speakers of Kaurna emerging". Kaurna is now frequently used to give Welcomes to Country.

Sustained efforts to revive the language in from 1989 included the writing of several Kaurna songs originally written in the Ngarrindjeri, Narungga and Kaurna languages. A second songbook, Kaurna Paltinna, was published in 1999. Following one-off workshops in 1990 and 1991, a Kaurna language program was introduced into Kaurna Plains School in 1992. Elizabeth City High School and Elizabeth West Adult Campus introduced the teaching of the language in 1994, and other schools have followed suit. TAFE courses to train Kaurna language teachers were developed by Mary-Anne Gale. Kaurna linguistics courses have been taught at the University of Adelaide since 1997. and both Kaurna and non-Kaurna have been studying and speaking the language.

The records, including an extensive vocabulary and grammar, compiled by Teichelmann and Schürmann in the 1840s have proven valuable in projects to reconstruct the language.

The Kaurna Learners' Guide (Kulurdu Marni Ngathaitya) was published in 2013, and Kaurna radio shows have been broadcast since 2012. The Kaurna Dictionary Project at the University of Adelaide, funded by a federal government grant, is under way to revise the spellings. Amery has been overseeing much of the work. It is intended that the final version will be released in print and in electronic form, including a phone app. In 2021, a printed Kaurna dictionary was published, as well as a Ngarrindjeri one. Amery and his wife, Ngarrindjeri linguist Mary-Anne Gale, have helped to drive the project.

There has been a growing number of Kaurna speakers in the 21st century.

The first students of courses specially tailored to the teaching of Aboriginal language, run by Tauondi Aboriginal College in Port Adelaide, enabling those who have learnt the language to pass on their skills to communities, graduated in July 2021. With the teachers and students often in the older age group, by July 2022 two of the first graduates had died. There is a need for more funding and more teachers.

=== Kaurna Warra Pintyanthi ===
Kaurna Warra Pintyanthi (meaning "creating Kaurna language") is a group developing and promoting the recovery of the Kaurna language. It was established in 2002 by two Kaurna elders, Lewis Yerloburka O'Brien and Alitya Wallara Rigney, and linguist Robert Amery. The group now includes other Kaurna people, teachers, linguists and language enthusiasts. It was created from a series of workshops funded by a University of Adelaide grant in 2000, and is hosted by the department of linguistics at the University of Adelaide. KWP-run language classes through both the Kaurna Plains School and the university.

KWP has created a uniform dialect of the language, making new words such as mukarntu (mukamuka brain + karntu lightning), meaning "computer", and other words for things such as modern appliances, transportation, cuisine, and other common features of life that have changed for the Kaurna people while the language was dormant. The Kaurna Warra Karrpanthi Aboriginal Corporation (KWK) was registered in 2013 to support the reclamation and promotion of the language of the Kaurna nation, including training and teaching.

=== Dictionary ===
In 2022 a dictionary written by Rob Amery and co-authors Susie Greenwood and Jasmin Morley was published. This includes words that were included in the handwritten list compiled by Teichelman and Schulman 160 years ago, as well as around 4,000 new words created in consultation with local elders and Kaurna speakers. The cover was designed by Kaurna artist Katrina Karlapina Power. Entitled Kaurna Warrapiipa, Kaurna Dictionary, the dictionary contains translations in both directions (Kaurna and English), and is published by Wakefield Press.

== Phonology ==
=== Vowels ===
Kaurna has three different vowels with contrastive long and short lengths (a, i, u, a:, i:, u:), and three diphthongs (ai, au, ui). The three main vowels are represented by ⟨a⟩, ⟨i⟩ and ⟨u⟩ respectively, with long vowels indicated by doubling the vowel. Historically, Kaurna has had ⟨e⟩ and ⟨o⟩ used varyingly in older versions of its orthography, but these are not reflected in the phonology of the language.

	Front	Back
High	i iː	u uː
Low	a aː	

=== Consonants ===
The consonant inventory of Kaurna is similar to that of other Pama-Nyungan languages (compare with Adnyamathanha, in the same Thura-Yura grouping). In the orthography, dental consonants are followed by ⟨h⟩ and palatals by ⟨y⟩, and retroflex consonants are preceded by ⟨r⟩, with the exception of ⟨rd⟩ /ɾ/. Pre-stopped consonants are preceded by ⟨d⟩. Below are the consonants of Kaurna (Amery, R & Simpson, J 2013).

		Peripheral		Laminal		Apical	
		Labial	Velar	Dental	Palatal	Alveolar	Retroflex
Stop		p	k	t̪	c	t	ʈ
Nasal	plain	m	ŋ	n̪	ɲ	n	ɳ
Nasal	pre-stopped			^{d̪}n̪	^{ɟ}ɲ	^{d}n	^{ɖ}ɳ
Lateral	plain			l̪	ʎ	l	ɭ
Lateral	pre-stopped			^{d̪}l̪	^{ɟ}ʎ	^{d}l	^{ɖ}ɭ
Tap						ɾ	
Trill						r	
Approximant		w		j			ɻ

=== Phonotactics ===
- All words must begin with a peripheral or laminal consonant (see Consonants above), excluding the pre-stopped nasals.
- All words must end with a vowel.
- In addition to the pre-stopped consonants, consonant clusters of a nasal followed by a stop are allowed.

=== Prosody ===
Kaurna places primary stress on the first syllable.

== Grammar ==
Kaurna has relatively free word order.

=== Nouns ===
==== Noun cases and suffixes ====
Kaurna uses a range of suffixed case markers to convey information including subjects, objects, spacio-temporal state and other such information. These sometimes have variations in pronunciation and spelling. Below is a table of some of these cases.

		Suffix
Ergative, Instrumental, Temporal		-rlu, -dlu (when following -i-)
Absolutive		-Ø
Dative		-ni
Genitive		-ku, -rna (variants)
Purposive		-itya
Aversive		-tuwayi
Locative		-ngka (or ⟨-ngga⟩) for bisyllabic roots -ila (or ⟨-illa⟩) for trisyllabic roots
Comitative		-ityangka, -lityangka
Allative	to places	-ana, -kana
Allative	to people	-itya, -litya
Ablative	from places	-unangku, -anangku, -nangku
Ablative	from people	-ityanungku
Perlative		-arra, -tarra
Semblative		-rli
Possessed		-tidi
Privative		-tina

==== Number ====
Kaurna has 3 numbers: singular, dual (-rla, -dla) and plural (-rna).

== Kaurna names ==
=== Renaming and dual naming ===
Efforts to reintroduce Kaurna names, beginning in 1980 with the naming of Warriappendi School, in 1980 by Auntie Leila Rankine, have been made within the public domain.

Since the Adelaide City Council drew up a Reconciliation Vision Statement in 1997, they committed to a dual naming project, working with Kaurna Warra Pintyanthi, to cover the city centre and North Adelaide, including the five public squares and Adelaide park lands. Victoria Square, in the centre of Adelaide city, is now also known as Tarntanyangga, all 29 Parks around the city have been assigned a Kaurna name, and the River Torrens is now also named Karrawirra Parri. The renaming of 39 sites was finalised and endorsed by the council in 2012. Others include Piltawodli (now Pirltawardli), "brushtail possum home"; Warriparringga (Warriparinga) "windy river place". The full list of square and park names, along with meanings and pronunciations, is available on the Council website.

Between 1980 and 2012, around 1000 entities were assigned Kaurna names, including people, pets, organisations, buildings, parks, walking trails, an allele (a hereditary gene or chromosome), brand names, and the Kari Munaintya tram and Tindo solar bus.

Some place names are known from historical sources, but not officially used as yet, such as Patpangga (Rapid Bay) "in the south"; Pattawilyangga (Patawalonga, Glenelg) "swamp gum foliage"; and Yertabulti (Port Adelaide).

Public artworks, beginning in 1995 with the Yerrakartarta installation outside the Intercontinental Hotel on North Terrace, Adelaide, have also incorporated words, phrases and text drawn from the Kaurna language, and the universities and other organisations have also taken on Kaurna names. The Tandanya National Aboriginal Cultural Institute uses the original name for Adelaide.

The annual Tarnanthi Festival of Contemporary Aboriginal and Torres Strait Islander Art takes its name from the Kaurna word meaning "to rise, come forth, spring up or appear".

=== Other Kaurna-derived names ===
Many prominent South Australian place names are drawn from the Kaurna language:

- Kauandilla (Cowandilla) from kauanda meaning "north" plus locative suffix -illa;
- Kanggarilla (Kangarilla) from kanggari meaning "shepherding" plus locative suffix -illa;
- Kondoparinga possibly from kundo meaning "chest" plus parri meaning "river" plus locative suffix -ngga;
- Maitpangga (Myponga);
- Ngaltingga (Aldinga) from ngalti (meaning unknown) plus locative suffix -ngga;
- Ngangkiparringga (Onkaparinga) from nganki meaning "woman" plus parri meaning "river" plus locative suffix -ngga;
- Nurlongga (Noarlunga) nurlo meaning "corner/curavature" plus locative suffix -ngga, probably in reference to Horseshoe Bend on the Onkaparinga River;
- Patawalonga from patta, a species of gum tree (possibly the swamp gum), plus wilya meaning "foliage" plus locative suffix -ngga;
- Waitpingga (Waitpinga) meaning "wind place"
- Willangga (Willunga)
- Wilyaru (Willyaroo) meaning a fully initiated adult man.
- Yatala most likely from yartala meaning "water running by the side of a river; inundation; cascade".
- Yernkalyilla (Yankalilla) 'place of the fallen bits'
- Yurridla (Uraidla) meaning "two ears", derived from a dreaming story in which the Mount Lofty Ranges are the body of a giant.

English-Kaurna hybridised placenames include:

- Glenunga from Scots language glen and Kaurna locative suffix -ngga.
- Paracombe from para meaning "river/stream" and Celtic language combe (similar to Welsh 'cwm') meaning "narrow way". Similar to South Australia's 'Picadilly', there exists a direct analogue in England, Parracombe in Devon, which likely contributed to the adoption of the name.

Possible Kaurna placenames include:

- Piccadilly. Although usually assumed to be named after Piccadilly, London, it is likely to be an anglicisation of the Kaurna pikodla meaning "two eyebrows", being a part of the same dreaming story that gave rise to "Uraidla".
- Yankalilla. Although almost certainly an Indigenous word, there are conflicting etymologies. The most likely is that it is derived from the Ramindjeri yangaiake meaning "hill", but with the Kaurna locative suffix -illa, or possibly yernkalyilla meaning "place of the fallen bits".

Newly-created names include:

- Warriappendi School. When the school moved in 1983, the new name was chosen by Leila Rankine and her sister Veronica Brodie (who had been key players in the school's foundation), in association with Narungga man Peter Buckskin, in consultation with Kaurna people. The word Warriappendi means "to seek" or "searching for", and marked the first time that Kaurna people themselves had chosen a Kaurna word for public naming purposes.

== See also ==
- Kaurna people
- Language death
- Matthew Moorhouse
- Pirltawardli
