= Percy McDonald Smith =

Anglican archdeacon

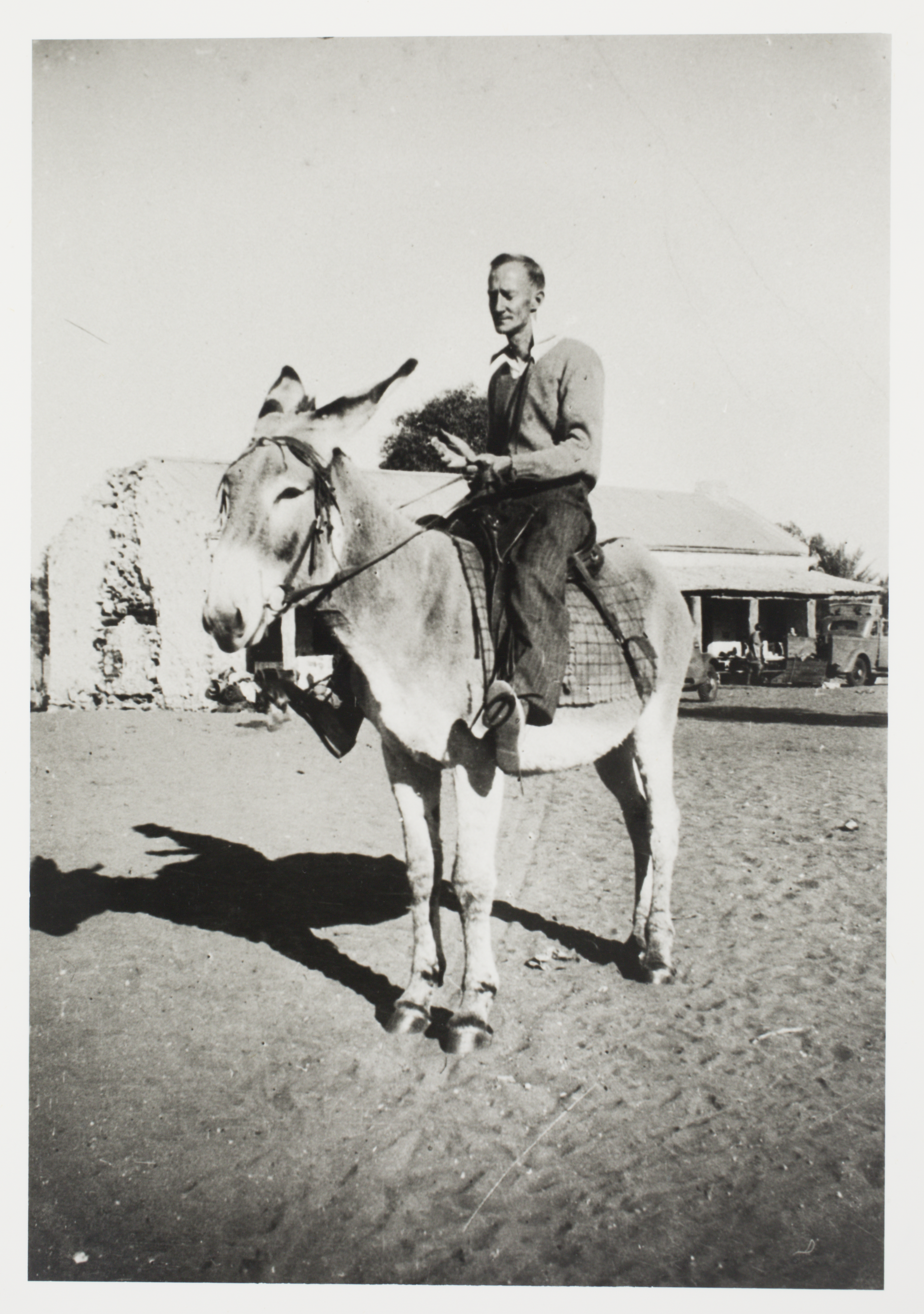
Father Percy Smith riding a donkey in 1937

Percy McDonald Smith MBE (1903-1982) was a priest in the Anglican Church of Australia. He was the first Archdeacon of the Northern Territory, and the founder of St John's Hostel in Alice Springs and St Francis House, a home for Aboriginal children in Adelaide.

== Career ==
Smith was the first Priest-in-Charge of Alice Springs for the Anglican Church. He was also the first Archdeacon of the Northern Territory, Australia, founder of St John's Hostel in Alice Springs and later the founder of St Francis House in the Adelaide suburb of Semaphore South at Glanville Hall.

Smith began visiting The Bungalow at the Alice Springs Telegraph Station in the 1930s.

The St Francis House Boys' Home at Glanville was a dream of Smith; he talked to the parents about bringing boys down for education and employment.

The manor became known as St Francis House: A Home for Inland Children, and over the next 14 years, more than 50 children found a home at St Francis. Former residents include Charles Perkins AO, Gordon Briscoe AO, John Moriarty AM, Les Nayda AM, and Inspector Bill Espie (Queens Medal for Bravery). Some notable sporting identities including Vincent Copley AM, Australian rules footballer Richie Bray, Reverend Ken Hampton OAM, and rugby league player Wally McArthur.

The history of St Francis House has been written by former Australian test cricketer Ashley Mallett.

Smith died in 1982.

== Recognition and honours ==
Smith was awarded the Member of the Order of the British Empire (MBE) in the 1980 Queen's Birthday Honours in recognition of his service to Aboriginal welfare.

His wife, Isabel Elizabeth Smith OAM, was awarded the Medal of the Order of Australia in the 1992 Australia Day Honours in recognition of her service to children's welfare.

The story of Smith's life was published in 1999 entitled, The Flower in the Desert: A Biography of Rev Canon P McD Smith MBE.

A film about his wife Isabel Smith called Finding Miss Almond is being made by director Mark Webber.
