= National Aboriginal and Torres Strait Islander Sports Awards =

National Aboriginal and Torres Strait Islander Sports Awards are a set of awards that recognise the sporting achievements of Aboriginal and Torres Strait Islander athletes in Australia. The awards were first held in 1986, but were not held between 2004 and 2022.

== Background ==
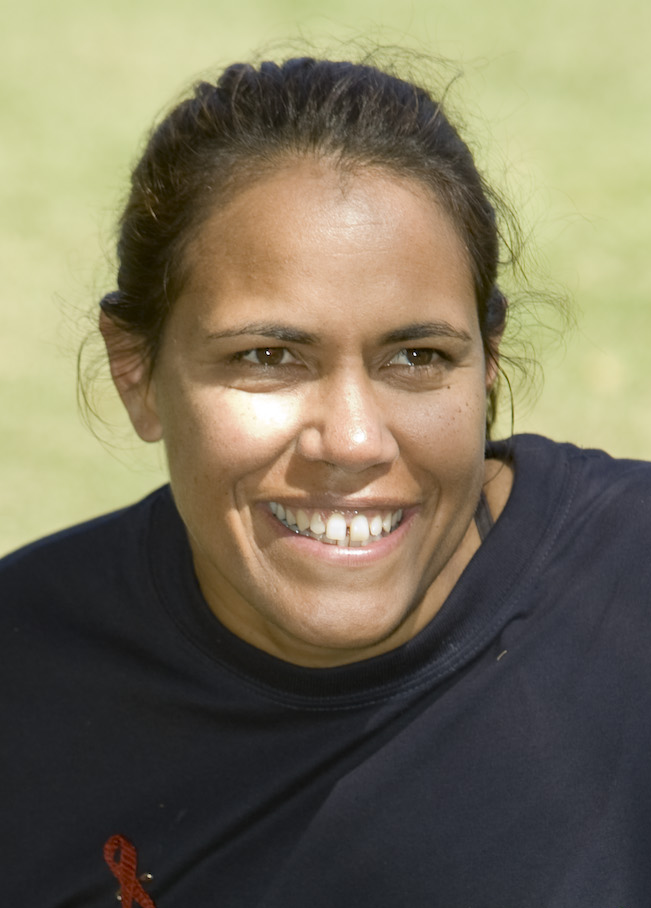
Cathy Freeman has won five National Sportswoman awards

The inaugural National Aboriginal and Torres Strait Islander Sports Awards were held at Adelaide's Hilton International Hotel on 6 September 1986. The Awards were established to pay tribute to the contribution of Aboriginal men and women to Australian and international sport. Charlie Perkins, Secretary of the Department of Aboriginal Affairs, strongly supported the establishment of the Awards and obtained Australian Government funding. The Aboriginal and Torres Strait Islander Commission continued funding after the department ceased to exist. Australian business also assisted with sponsorship.

Sydney Jackson, a champion Australian rules footballer and sports administrator made the following statements regarding the establishment of the Awards:
the most exciting thing that has happened in Aboriginal sport outside individual achievement and recognition of Aboriginal sports men and women will go a long way towards encouraging you Aboriginal athletes to preserve in the development of their natural talents.
Clyde Holding, the Minister of Aboriginal Affairs stated at the inaugural Awards that
'formal recognition of the big contribution made to Australian sport by Aboriginals is long overdue.

The inaugural Awards aimed to be a gala event replicating the ABC Sports Award of the Year and Australian Sport Awards ceremonies. Due to the costs of holding the Awards, it was proposed to hold them every two years. Until 2003 the Awards were televised by either SBS or the ABC. Award ceremonies generally included performances by talented Aboriginal performers. David Gulpilil danced at the inaugural Awards.

== Location and dates ==
No!	Date	Location
1st	6 September 1986	Adelaide, South Australia
2nd	12 November 1988	Brisbane, Queensland
3rd	25 October 1991	Sydney, New South Wales
4th	3 November 1993	Melbourne, Victoria
5th	30 June 1995	Darwin, Northern Territory
6th	16 October 1997	Perth, Western Australia
7th	16 October 1999	Hobart, Tasmania
8th	9 November 2001	Sydney, New South Wales
9th	7 November 2003	Adelaide, South Australia
10th	11 November 2023	Melbourne, Victoria
11th	16 November 2024	Melbourne, Victoria
12th	15 November 2025	Brisbane, Queensland
13th	7 November 2026	Sydney, New South Wales

== Winners ==
=== 1st 1986 ===
The inaugural Awards recognized a high number of former Aboriginal athletes. It was reported that never before had so many Aboriginal sporting champions congregated in one place. At the Awards, Evonne Goolagong Cawley received her Sport Australia Hall of Fame gold medallion. She joined Lionel Rose and Polly Farmer as the only Aboriginal members of the Hall of Fame in 1986.

- National Sportswomen – Evonne Goolagong Cawley (Tennis)
- National Sportsman – Lionel Rose (Boxing)
- National Junior Sportswomen – Treahna Hamm (Judo)
- National Junior Sportsman – David Ross (AFL)
- Alma Thorpe Victorian Health Service Fitzroy All Stars Football Club
- State Award:
  - ACT Awards: Wally Austin (AFL), Delma Smith (Volleyball), Harry Williams (Soccer), Percy Knight (Rugby league), Neil Bulger (Cricket), Bob Huddleston (Boxing), Benny Mills (Basketball), Joanne Leisputty (Softball), Neil Harwood (Basketball)
  - NSW Awards: Peter Cooley (Surfing), Larry Corowa (Rugby league), Mark Ella (Rugby union), Marcia Ella (Netball), Evonne Goolagong Cawley (Tennis), Jack Hassan (Boxing), Felicity Huntington (Field hockey), Peter Kirby, Lee Madden (Tennis), Tony Mundine (Boxing), Eric Simms (Rugby league)
  - NT: Phynea Clarke (Field hockey), Louisa Collins (Netball), Rose Damaso (Basketball/Netball), Bill Dempsey (AFL), Brian Dixon (Basketball/Baseball), Ivy Hampton (Darts), Ricky Peterson (Boxing), Bill Roe (AFL), Maurice Rioli (AFL), David Ross (AFL), Horrie Seden (Darts)
  - QLD: Arthur Beetson (Rugby league), Andrea Collins (Basketball), Jeffrey Dynevor (Boxing), Darby McCarthy (Horse racing), Ian King, Warren Lawton (Paralympic athletics), Andrea Mason (Netball), Lionel Morgan (Rugby league), Danny Morseu (Basketball), Doug Sam (Boxing), Hector Thompson (Boxing), Priscilla West (Basketball)
  - SA: Laura Agius (Netball), Bert Clark (administration), Michael Graham (AFL), Ken Hampton (Athletics), Walter Macathur (Athletics, Rugby league), Sonny Morey (AFL), John Kundereri Moriarty (soccer), Roger Rigney (AFL), Jim Stanley (Boxing), Faith Thomas (Cricket), Don Tschuna (AFL), Mark Tutton (Volleyball), Keith Warrior (AFL)
  - TAS: Erica Bartlett (Netball), Roger Brown (Cricket), Leonie Dickson (Netball/Basketball), Beverly Dillon (Netball), Greg Lovell (Woodchopping), Brian Mansell (Cycling), Doug Maynard (AFL), Maureen Stafford (Netball), Carl Thomas (Boxing), Brian Thomas (Judo)
  - VIC: Tony Briggs (Athletics), Graeme Brooke (Boxing), Kevin Coombs (Paralympic basketball), Treahna Hamm (Judo), Syd Jackson (AFL), Glenn James (AFL), Gundy James (Golf), Norm McDonald, Lionel Rose, Alma Thorpe (administration), Kyle Vander Kuyp (Athletics)
  - WA: May Chalker (Golf), Mark Chalker (Golf), Polly Farmer (AFL), Jim Krakouer (AFL), Phil Krakouer (AFL), Ted Kilmurray (AFL), Irwin Lewis (AFL), Stephen Michael (AFL), Lorraine Pindan (Athletics)

=== 2nd 1988 ===
- National Sportswomen – Cheryl Drayton (Badminton)
- National Sportsman – Tony Jones (Boxing)
- National Junior Sportswomen – Majorie Patrick (Vision impaired Swimming/Athletics)
- National Junior Sportsman – Darryl Hiles (Boxing)
- National Sports Official of the Year – Redfern All Blacks
- Special Recognition Awards – Bob Bloomfield (AFL) and Eunice Peachey (Dubbo Pacemakers Club)

=== 3rd 1991 ===
- National Sportswomen – Cathy Freeman (Athletics)
- National Sportsman – Karl Feifar (Paralympic Athletics)
- National Junior Sportswomen – Toni Gableish
- National Junior Sportsman – Matthew AhMat (AFL)
- National Sports Official of the Year – Steve Cubillo (Basketball)

=== 4th 1993 ===
- National Sportswomen – Donna Burns (Paralympic Basketball)
- National Sportsman – Gavin Wanganeen (AFL)
- National Junior Sportswomen – Syripa Macer (Judo)
- National Junior Sportsman – Lachlan Wright (Soccer, Rugby league, Surf life saving)
- National Sports Official of the Year – Maisie Austin (Basketball)
- Special Achiever Awards: ACT – Caine George (Basketball); NSW – Natalie Bell (Soccer); NT – Bernie Devine (Powerlifting); QLD – Lorelle Morrissey (Field hockey); SA – Anthony Drover (Soccer); TAS – Sean Gower (Indoor cricket); VIC – Gundy James (Golf); WA – John McGuire (Cricket)

=== 5th 1995 ===
- National Sportswomen – Cathy Freeman (Athletics)
- National Sportsman – Kyle Vander-Kuyp (Athletics)
- National Junior Sportswomen – Helena Saunders (Netball)
- National Junior Sportsman – Joshua Ugle (Karate and Badminton)
- National Coach of the Year – Patsy Elarde (Basketball)
- National Sports Official of the Year – Hyacinth Tungutalum (AFL)
- National Special Achiever Awards – Eddie Gilbert (Cricket) and May Chalker (Golf)
- State Achievers Award: ACT – Percy Knight (Rugby league); NSW – Kevin Hamilton (Sprinting); NT – Nova Peris (Field hockey); QLD – Steve Renouf (Rugby league); SA – Michael Graham; TAS – Lawrie Lowery (Boxing, Running and Swimming); VIC – Glenn James (AFL); WA – Bill Dempsey (AFL)

=== 6th 1997 ===
- National Sportswomen – Cathy Freeman (Athletics)
- National Sportsman – Baeden Choppy (Field hockey)
- National Junior Sportswomen – Rohanee Cox (Basketball)
- National Junior Sportsman – Anthony Martin (Weightlifting)
- National Disabled Sportswoman of the Year – Syripa Macer (Karate)
- National Disabled Sportsman of the Year – Lee Towers (Basketball)
- National Coach of the Year – Maisie Austin (Basketball)
- National Sports Official of the Year – Gerard 'Jacko' Whitby (Athletics)
- National Sports Innovation Award – Palawa Recreation Program
- State Achiever Awards: ACT – Katrina Fanning (Rugby league); NSW – Scott Gardiner (Golf); NT – Graeme Smith (AFL); QLD – Michael Viti (Touch football ); SA – Lindsay Bassani (AFL ); TAS – Grant Brown (Boxing); VIC – Kamahl Lord (BMX ); WA – Shane Hearn (Athletics)
- Special Tribute Award – Charlie Perkins for administration of indigenous role and achievements as a soccer player.
- Special Contribution Awards – Bill and Maley Hayward (AFL) and Joy Cardona (AFL umpire)

=== 7th 1999 ===
- National Sportswomen – Cathy Freeman (athletics)
- National Sportsman – Nicky Winmar (AFL) / Cliff Lyons (Rugby league)
- National Junior Sportswomen – Kelly Denner (Swimming)
- National Junior Sportsman – Ashley Anderson (Swimming)
- National Disabled Sportswoman of the Year – Beverley Champion (Athletics)
- National Disabled Sportsman of the Year – Ashley Pardon (Athletics)
- National Coach of the Year – John Roe (American football)
- National Sports Official of the Year – Scott Butler (Basketball)
- National Sports Innovation Award – Croc Eisteddfod
- National Sports Writers Award – Lionel Rose for his unforgettable victory against Fighting Harada in Tokyo during 1968.
- Outstanding Contributions by Older Persons – George Bracken and Faith Thomas
- Outstanding Contributions to Indigenous Sports – Danny Morseu and Andrea Collins

=== 8th 2001 ===
- National Sportswomen – Cathy Freeman (Athletics)
- National Sportsman – Jason Gillespie (Cricket) / Andrew McLeod (AFL)
- National Junior Sportswomen – Suellyn Hayes (Wrestling)
- National JUnior Sportsman – Fred Agius (Soccer)
- National Disabled Sportswoman of the Year – Christine Maynard (Basketball)
- National Disabled Sportsman of the Year – Warren Lawton (Athletics)
- National Coach of the Year – Edward Boyd Scully (Boxing)
- National Sports Official of the Year – Marmingee Hand
- International Volunteers Award – Joseph Donovan
- Dr Charles Perkins Award – Michael Long (AFL) / Anthony Mundine (Boxing)
- State Achievers: ACT – Bruce Martin (Water polo); NSW – Kevin Bloomfield (Field hockey), James McAllister (Sailing); NT – Bo Delacruz (Touch football); SA – Tim Ewen (Athletics); VIC – Barry Firebrace (Cricket); QLD – Jade Casey (Diving); TAS – Phillip Marshall (Field hockey); WA – Beau Anderson (Darts);

=== 9th 2003 ===
- National Sportswomen – Bo De La Cruz (Touch football)
- National Sportsman – Anthony Mundine (Boxing)
- National Junior Sportswomen – Kathleen Logue (Darts)
- National Junior Sportsman – Kyle Anderson (Darts)
- National Disabled Sportswoman of the Year – Tegan Blanch (Tennis/Swimming/Athletics)
- National Disabled Sportsman of the Year – Troy Murphy (Ten pin bowling)
- National Coach of the Year – John Roe (American football)
- National Sports Official of the Year – Stacey Campton (Netball)
- Dr Charles Perkins Award – Cathy Freeman (Athletics) / Kyle Vander Kuyp (Athletics)
- State Achievers: ACT – Katrina Fanning (Rugby league); NSW – David Peachey (Rugby league); NT – Sarrita King (Netball); QLD – Ashley Anderson (Swimming); SA – Joseph Milera (AFL); TAS – Nathan Polley (Boxing); VIC – Mungara Brown (AFL); WA – Bianca Franklin (Netball)

=== 10th 2023 ===
- National Sportsperson of the Year – Ashleigh Gardner (Cricket)
- National Junior Sportsperson of the Year – Jessie-May Hall (Basketball)
- National Sportsperson with a Disability of the Year – Amanda Reid (Cycling/snowboarding)
- National Senior Elder Sportsperson of the Year – Pamela Pedersen OAM (Ocean swimming)
- National Sports Team of the Year Award – Walgett Aboriginal Connection (Rugby league)
- National Community Sporting Organisation of the Year – The Torres Strait Youth and Recreational Sporting Association
- National Sports Competition of the Year – National Indigenous Basketball Tournament
- National Volunteer of the Year – Jenny Prior
- National Sports Official of the Year – Jacqui Dover
- National Coach of the Year – Ronald Griffiths claimed
- National Sports Media of the Year – Jake Duke
- National Lifetime Achievement Award – Olympian Cathy Freeman OAM
- National Trailblazer Award – Kevin Coombs

== 11th 2024 ==
- National Sportsperson of the Year – Patty Mills (Basketball)
- National Junior Sportsperson of the Year – Telaya Blacksmith (Athletics)
- National Sportsperson with a Disability of the Year – Amanda Reid (Cycling/snowboarding)
- National Senior Elder Sportsperson of the Year – Uncle Tony Lovett (Australian football)
- National Sports Team of the Year Award – Walgett Aboriginal Connection (Rugby league)
- National Community Sporting Organisation of the Year – Rumbalara Football and Netball Club
- National Sports Competition of the Year – Koori Knockout
- National Volunteer of the Year – Justin Downing
- National Sports Official of the Year – Joshua James (Australian football)
- National Coach of the Year – Jessica Skinner (Rugby league)
- National Sports Media of the Year – Hannah Hollis
- National Lifetime Achievement Award – Lionel Rose
- National Trailblazer Award – Glenn James OAM

== 12th 2025 ==
- National Sportsperson of the Year – Tamika Upton (Rugby league)
- National Junior Sportsperson of the Year – Landen Smales (Surfing)
- National Sportsperson with a Disability of the Year – Katelyn Smith (Football)
- National Senior Elder Sportsperson of the Year – Costal Emu's Team MacLean
- National Sports Team of the Year Award – Fitzroy Stars (Australian football and netball)
- National Community Sporting Organisation of the Year – Arrernte Community Boxing Academy
- National Sports Competition of the Year – Murri Rugby League Carnival
- National Volunteer of the Year – April Le Seur (Australian football and netball)
- National Sports Official of the Year – James Dean (Tennis)
- National Coach of the Year – David Williams (Football)
- National Sports Media of the Year – Charlie King
- National Lifetime Achievement Award – Evonne Goolagong-Cawley (Tennis)
- National Trailblazer Award – Lydia Williams (Football)

== 13th 2026 ==
- National Sportsperson of the Year – Callum Peters (Boxing)
- National Junior Sportsperson of the Year – Leihani Zoric (Surfing)
- National Sportsperson with a Disability of the Year – Layla Sharp (Athletics)
- National Senior Elder Sportsperson of the Year – Christoher Hume (Masters Boxing)
- National Sports Team of the Year Award – Fitzroy Stars Women’s Football Team (Australian Rules Football)
- National Community Sporting Organisation of the Year – John Moriaty Football
- National Sports Competition of the Year – 30th UniSport Indigenous Nationals 2026 (University Sport)
- National Volunteer of the Year – Aunty Emma Thomas (Bunurong Sporting Club)
- National Sports Official of the Year – Jordan Kiss (Netball)
- National Coach of the Year – Troy Williamson (Hockey)
- National Sports Media of the Year – Bo De la Cruz
- National Lifetime Achievement Award – Tony Mundine Boxing)
- National Trailblazer Award – Johnny Mullagh (Cricket)

== See also ==
- Aboriginal and Islander Sports Hall of Fame
