= Edith Espie =

Australian social worker (1903–1983)

Edith Espie (1903–1983) was a Western Arrernte foster mother and lay social worker in Alice Springs, Australia.

== Biography ==
Born at Jay Creek, near Alice Springs, Australia, Espie lived at The Bungalow, an institution for Aboriginal children. According to local historian Jay Petrick, Espie was a kind child and helped care for the other children by helping teacher and matron Ida Standley.

A jockey in her teen years, Espie rode, in colours, at the local races. Espie worked variously making pies and pasties for Snow Kenna's Walk-in Picture Show (later known as Pioneer Theatre), was the barmaid at the Stuart Arms Hotel, and did ironing for single men.

Espie had seven children with Victor Lawrence Cook, a labourer from South Australia. Espie worked as a housemaid at Huckitta Station, north-east of Alice Springs, from where one of her sons remembered leaving in 1941, aged six, to attend Hartley Street School in Alice Springs. Cook left Espie to start a "new – white – family 'down south'". Her son Bill Espie, to whom she gave birth in a tent outside the town hospital, later received a Queen's Commendation for Brave Conduct.

In addition to raising her biological children, Espie fostered several children and, according to Petrick, "had a high moral code, stressing the importance of modesty". Gloria Lee, a Chinese-American Alice Springs resident, recalled that Espie took care of her after Lee's mother died.

After suffering from cancer for years, she died on 8 March 1983 and was buried at the Garden Cemetery in Alice Springs.

== Legacy ==
Espie Street in Alice Springs is named for her.
