= Aboriginal Publications Foundation =

Former Aboriginal Australian publishing body

The Aboriginal Publications Foundation (APF) was a national Australian Aboriginal organisation that existed from 1970 to 1982, based first in Sydney, New South Wales, and later in Perth, Western Australia. It existed to promote and fund creative arts projects by Aboriginal people, especially written works. It published a national quarterly magazine called Identity (1971–1982), which carried articles by many prominent Aboriginal rights activists.

== History ==
Established in 1970, the foundation offered full membership to Aboriginal and Torres Strait Islander people, and associate membership for non-Indigenous people. Charles Perkins, who was then employed as a research officer at the Office of Aboriginal Affairs, was a crucial figure in the establishment of the foundation.

The foundation received a grant from the Office of Aboriginal Affairs at the time of its setting up, with the intention of becoming self-supporting over time; however, it never did. the foundation's base was first in Sydney until its office was established in Perth in 1974.

When the Aboriginal Arts Board of the Australia Council (AAB) was created, it had similar aims as the foundation, leading to some duplication of work. From mid-1975, promotional work carried out by the foundation was put under the control of the AAB, while the foundation became a referral body for the AAB. Although a committee was elected for 1983/84, and an office was established at the Australian Institute of Aboriginal Studies (AIAS) run by part-time volunteers, the foundation ceased operations after the last issue of Identity was published in mid-1982. The AAB was by then fulfilling most of the functions of the foundation.

In July 1983, George Harwood was appointed managing editor for 6–12 months in July 1983, after he had been working voluntarily running the office which he had organised at AIAS.

== Aims ==
Its initial aims and objectives were, according to its listed Rules:

- To publish a journal of creative writing and the arts being the work of Aboriginal Australians
- To publish books, pamphlets and other publications by, and for, Aboriginal Australians
- To commission such works for publication
- To organise training for Aboriginal Australians in literary, visual and other relevant arts and crafts
- To provide scholarships, fellowships and advances and other assistance for Aboriginal creative artists of promise
- To conduct competitions, arrange exhibitions, make awards and in other ways recognize and reward distinguished performance by Aboriginal Australians in the literary, visual and related arts and crafts.

However, by 1980 the sole function of the foundation was to publish Identity.

== Governance and people ==
An elected committee administered the organisation, appointed the editor, and was somewhat involved in the content of its publications. It met at different places around the country. A large part of the committee's work comprised obtaining grants for the foundation in order to produce its publications, Identity and Aboriginal and Islander Forum.

Oodgeroo Noonuccal (Kath Walker) was inaugural president, with Doug Nicholls and Don Brady as vice-presidents, Charles Perkins taking the role of secretary and Gordon Briscoe treasurer. Other members of this committee were George Abdullah, John Moriarty, Bob Randall, Ken Hampton (1935–1987), and Harry Jakamarra Nelson (c. 1946–2021).

Cheryl Buchanan (founder of the Black Resource Centre in Melbourne, later Brisbane) and Sue Chilly (co-founder of Black Women's Action in Sydney) were colleagues at the APF.

== Publications ==
Identity, first published in 1971, was a national quarterly magazine. It was produced in Sydney until 1974, and then in Perth. Its content encompassed topics "from robust debate about political issues to community profiles featuring local football teams". It celebrated the achievements if both famous and less well-known people, and attracted a wide readership, including Indigenous and non-Indigenous people.

In July 1975 (volume 2, issue 5), the title changed to Aboriginal and Thursday Islander Identity, with the following issue changing to Aboriginal and Islander Identity.

Editors of Identity included Barrie Ovenden, John Newfong, Jack Davis, Les Malezar, and Jack Waterford.

In 1980, it was self-described as "a national magazine of Aboriginal and Islanders views, opinions and style and [it was aimed] at promoting Aboriginal and Islanders talent in the various forms of Art".(Identity, 4 (1), October 1980. p.1).

Identity ceased publication with volume 4, number 7, in June 1982, after the AAB withdrew its financial support. Much effort was put into cutting costs and trying to find alternative funding, including in 1983/84 from the Minister for Aboriginal Affairs, but this was not forthcoming. The last issue included the transcript of an address given by Charlie Perkins, then chair of the Aboriginal Development Commission, to the Uniting Church Synod, entitled "The 1988 Bi-centennial: No cause for celebration". After his address, the Synod resolved not to participate in any of the celebrations unless some progress was seen in advancing Aboriginal rights.

Back issues of Identity are available online on the AIATSIS website. The magazine is also fully indexed in an online resource provided by the State Library of New South Wales, the Australian Indigenous Index, or INFOKOORI. This is an index to the Koori Mail, as well as to biographical information from various magazines, including Identity (full run); Our AIM (1907-1961); and Dawn (1952-1969) / New Dawn (1970-1975).

The Foundation also published Aboriginal and Islander Forum, which began in 1975 and ceased publication with volume 3, number 12, January 1978/ December 1979.

== Contributors ==
Other contributors to Identity included Kevin Gilbert, Doug Nicholls, Bruce McGuinness, Reg Saunders, and Denis Walker (Kath Walker's eldest son).
