= Remembering Charlie Perkins =

- Starring: Gordon Briscoe
- Release date: 2009
- Country: Australia
- Language: English

Remembering Charlie Perkins is a 2009 film tribute to Aboriginal activist Charles Perkins. It features Gordon Briscoe, who was with Perkins from early times. Briscoe recounts Perkins' life and events in activism. The film is presented in conjunction with ABC Fora.
