= Bill Espie =

Australian police officer (1935–2011)

William Leonard Espie (25 June 1935 – 22 September 2011) was the highest ranking Aboriginal person to serve on any Australian police force; he was, at one point the Chief Inspector in the NSW Police Force. He is remembered as a "Centralian hero".

== Early life ==
Espie was born in Alice Springs, one of several children of Edith Espie, an Arrernte woman, and Victor Cook, who soon left to "start a new - white - family down south". His family home is described as a good one and that his mother did their best for them; his mother Edith was always helping other people in the community and often took foster children in to their home.

In his early teens Espie came into contact with Anglican priest, Father Percy Smith, who arranged for him, and a number of other Aboriginal boys to go to St Francis House in Adelaide alongside the now prominent names of Charles Perkins, Gordon Briscoe and Brian Butler. This was supported by his mother, who wanted her children to have a better chance at life.

In 1955 Espie joined the Australian Army, as a saper in the engineers and, later, was appointed a field engineer before leaving in 1961.

On 14 August 1961 he started his training with the NSW Police Force where he worked to become Chief Inspector, the highest position ever held by an Aboriginal person.

Espie was well respected in the police force and, in March 1965, received a lot of attention for his bravery when he rescued two trapped men, from separate burning cars. He retired from the police force, after 30 years of serve, in April 1991.

During this time he received the following awards:

- 1965, Queen's Commendation for Brave Conduct
- 1965, Commissioner's Commendation
- 1965, Peter Mitchell Award
- 1965, George Lewis Trophy
- 1971, Commissioner's Commendation
- 1977, Commissioner's Commendation
- 1980, National Medal
- 1988, First Class National Medal
- Australian National Police Service Medal

== Later life ==
Espie died on September 22, 2011, in the Concord Repatriation Hospital in Sydney and his ashes were placed at the Alice Springs Garden Cemetery.

== Legacy ==
There is a memorial to Espie at the Hartley Street School in Alice Springs, which is now operating as a museum.

Much of Espie's memorabilia is on permanent display at the NSW Police Academy in Goulburn.
