= Don Brady =

Donald Brady (20 April 1927 – 27 January 1984) was an Australian missionary, Methodist pastor and indigenous rights activist.

== Early life ==
Brady was born on 20 April 1927 at the Palm Island Aboriginal Settlement in Queensland. He was the son of Grace (née Creed) and Jim Brady. His parents were Kuku Yalanji from Far North Queensland.

Brady was raised on Palm Island. After leaving school he worked as a farm labourer and as a tent boxer.

== Church activities ==
Brady trained as a missionary with the Aborigines Inland Mission of Australia (AIM), graduating from the Men's Native Workers Training College in Karuah, New South Wales, in 1949. He subsequently worked at various AIM stations in country New South Wales, including at Brewarrina, Walcha and Moree.

Brady moved back to Queensland in 1962 and undertook further training at the Methodist Training College in Brisbane. He became a lay pastor at the West End Methodist Mission in 1964, focusing on Aboriginal people living in Brisbane. He was involved with the Christian Community Centre at the Leichhardt Street Methodist Church in Spring Hill, which catered for over 3,000 people, and also established a sports club and gymnasium in Red Hill where he gave boxing lessons and "formed the Yelangi dance group, whose performances he accompanied on the didgeridoo".

In 1972, the Brisbane Central Methodist Mission decided to end its association with Brady over his activism.

== Activism ==
Brady became involved in the organised Aboriginal rights movement in the late 1960s, having visited the United States in 1968 as a Churchill Fellow. He became associated with the "militant" side of the movement, helping to establish the Brisbane Tribal Council alongside Cheryl Buchanan and Denis Walker and serving as a vice-president of the Aboriginal Publications Foundation. His actions and views often brought him into conflict with "moderates" like Neville Bonner and the One People of Australia League.

Brady led a number of marches and other actions, primarily targeted at the Queensland state government's policies. In January 1970, he led a protest in Townsville which culminated in attendees burning and spitting on a copy of the Aboriginal and Torres Strait Islanders Act 1965. Later that year he led a silent march in Brisbane to commemorate the loss of Aboriginal lives, culminating in a speech by Kath Walker and a memorial service at the Leichhardt Street Methodist Church.

In November 1971, Brady and Denis Walker were arrested and charged with assaulting police following a demonstration against proposed legislation which would have given the state government greater control over Aboriginal reserves. In 1978, Brady led a deputation which walked from Brisbane to Canberra to meet with Aboriginal affairs minister Ian Viner.

== Personal life ==
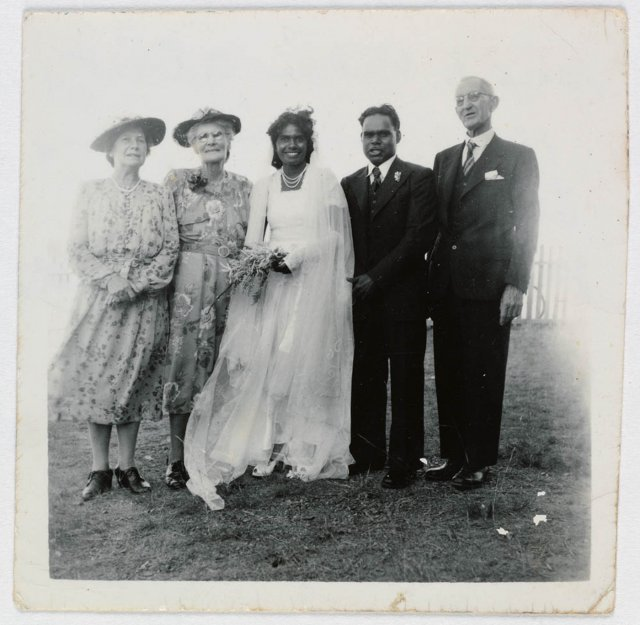
Wedding of Brady and Aileen Willis at Cherbourg Aboriginal Settlement, 1952

In 1952, Brady married Aileen Willis, a fellow missionary. The couple had eight children, two of which predeceased him. He died in South Brisbane on 27 January 1984, aged 56, due to "pneumonia complicating hypertensive cerebrovascular disease".
