= Kevin Gilbert =

Kevin Gilbert may refer to:

- Kevin Gilbert (musician) (1966–1996), American musician
- Kevin Gilbert (author) (1933–1993), Aboriginal Australian writer
