= John Taylor (public servant) =

Australian public servant

John Taylor AO

Secretary of the Department of Aboriginal Affairs
- In office 6 May 1981 – 29 March 1984

Commonwealth Auditor-General
- In office 1988 – 13 January 1995

Personal details
- Born: John Casey Taylor; 2 December 1930 Melbourne
- Died: 14 May 2011 (aged 80) Canberra
- Spouse(s): Valerie Booth (m. 1959–2011; his death)
- Education: University of Melbourne; Australian National University
- Occupation: Public servant

John Casey Taylor AO (2 December 1930 – 14 May 2011) was a senior Australian public servant. He was Secretary of the Department of Aboriginal Affairs from 1981 to 1984.

== Life and career ==
John Taylor was born on 2 December 1930 in Melbourne. He graduated from University of Melbourne with a degree in commerce.

Taylor joined the Australian Public Service in 1952 as a clerk in the Victorian branch of the Postmaster-General's Department.

Between 1974 and 1981, Taylor was a Commissioner on the Public Service Board.

In 1981 he was appointed Secretary of the Department of Aboriginal Affairs. In 1984 Charles Perkins, succeeded him as Secretary in the department and he was appointed Australia's Consul-General in New York.

Between 1988 and 1995 he was Commonwealth Auditor-General. As Auditor-General, Taylor said he saw his main achievements as providing a much more efficient and focused service to the Australian Parliament and people, and keeping up with (if not getting ahead of) contemporary professional standards.

Taylor died on 14 May 2011.

== Awards ==
In 1990, Taylor was made an Officer of the Order of Australia for his public service.

Government offices
Preceded by Tony Ayers	Secretary of the Department of Aboriginal Affairs; 1981 – 1984	Succeeded by Charles Perkins
Preceded by John Monaghan	Commonwealth Auditor-General; 1988 – 1995	Succeeded by Pat Barrett
Diplomatic posts
Preceded by Denis Cordner	Australian Consul General in New York; 1984–1988	Succeeded by Chris Hurford
