= Wilfred James "Bill" Gray =

Australian public servant and specialist in Aboriginal affairs

Bill Gray AM

Secretary of the Department of Aboriginal Affairs
- In office 1 December 1988 – 4 March 1990

Personal details
- Born: Wilfred James Gray
- Occupation: Public servant

Wilfred James "Bill" Gray AM is a former senior Australian public servant, and specialist in Aboriginal affairs.

From 1987 to 1988 he was Chairman of the Aboriginal and Torres Strait Islander Commission (ATSIC) Task Force, and was Secretary of the Department of Aboriginal Affairs between 1988 and 1990. He was the inaugural ATSIC CEO between 1990 and 1991.

Between 1995 and 2000 he was the Commissioner of the Australian Electoral Commission.

Since his retirement in 2000, he has published academic reports on Aboriginal matters, and assisted the Federal Government on investigations into Indigenous programs.

Government offices
Preceded by Charles Perkins	Secretary of the Department of Aboriginal Affairs; 1988 – 1990	Department abolished
