= St Francis House =

Home for Aboriginal Australian boys

Coordinates: 34°50′56″S 138°28′53″E

St Francis House, the successor to the Church of England Hostel for Inland Children, was a home for inland Aboriginal Australian boys from 1946 to 1959 at Glanville Hall in Semaphore South, Adelaide, South Australia.

== History ==
In 1945 Father Percy Smith opened the Church of England Hostel for Inland Children, operated by the Church of England in Australia in a private house at 13 Pembroke Street in Kensington Park, an eastern suburb of Adelaide. Smith was an Anglican minister who had founded St John's Hostel in 1941 in Alice Springs in central Australia, which provided accommodation for Aboriginal and non-Aboriginal children from remote areas who were attending school in Alice Springs. He had been concerned at the lack of opportunities for children housed in the government facility for Aboriginal children in Alice Springs, called The Bungalow.

In 1945 six Aboriginal boys from St John's were transferred to the residence, which was rented from a Miss Florence Murphy, a member of the church. The house in Kensington Park served as a "training home" for the boys, aged between 9 and 12, who attended the Marryatville Primary School. St John's Hostel eventually closed down in the 1970s.

Smith purchased Glanville Hall on behalf of the Australian Board of Missions (ABM) to provide accommodation for young Aboriginal boys from remote areas who were attending school in the local area. He founded the St Francis Boys' Home in order to bring boys down (including several from Alice Springs in the Northern Territory) for education and employment. In 1946, after the ABM assisted with the purchase of Glanville Hall at Semaphore, the Kensington Park home closed, and the boys transferred to the new hostel, which later became known as St Francis House.

In a time when it was commonly believed that Aboriginal children were unable to be educated beyond Grade 3, Smith saw the home as a way of providing a family environment for the children to pursue a higher level of education without losing their Aboriginal identity. He described the hostel as “not one of fostering, but rather a boarding establishment to which boys came with their mothers' consent for the school year, and in that respect it was no different from children being sent by their parents to a boarding school".

The manor became known as "St Francis House: A Home for Inland Children" and over the next 14 years, more than 50 children found at home there. At St Francis House, the boys formed life-long bonds with Smith and his wife, and with each other.

In 1949, a number of boys who had been evacuated to Mulgoa, New South Wales during the Second World War were transferred to St Francis House, increasing the number of residents to more than 20. The ABM asked for government assistance, but none was forthcoming until a review was done. An extensive review gave a positive report of the home, but recommended extensions to accommodate more boys, which it would fund on condition that the ABM agreed to take on any boy recommended by the Director of Native Affairs.

On 4 June 1952, the government purchased the home, which was by then in need of repairs, and provided ongoing financial assistance on the understanding that more boys would be transferred there from the Northern Territory.

St Francis House was finally closed in December 1959, partly because of new assimilationist policies. The remaining older boys were transferred to Karingal Youth Hostel.

Former resident John Kundereri Moriarty said that St Francis House was an exceptional home.

== Documentation ==
Former Australian test cricketer Ashley Mallett has written a history of St Francis House, called The Boys from St Francis, published in 2018 by Wakefield Press.

The St Francis House Project, "History & Legacy of St Francis House: A Home for Inland Children", was established in 2018 to document the history of the home.

A film about St Francis House and its founds Percy Smith and his wife Isabel Smith is being made by director Mark Webber. The film is called Finding Miss Almond.

== Notable people ==
Some residents of St Francis House who later went on to forge sporting careers and/or became engaged in Indigenous activism include:

- Richie Bray
- Gordon Briscoe AO
- Malcolm Cooper
- Vincent Copley, footballer and activist
- Bill Espie (Queen's Medal for Bravery)
- Ken Hampton, who went on to play football for Port Adelaide
- Wilf Huddleton
- Wally McArthur
- Sonny Morey (born 1945), footballer
- John Kundereri Moriarty AM, soccer player and artist
- Les Nayda AM
- Charles Perkins AO
- Harold Thomas (Bundoo) who designed the Aboriginal flag.
- Ron Tilmouth
