= Wally McArthur (rugby league) =

Australian rugby league footballer and track & field athlete

Personal information
- Full name: Wally McArthur
- Born: 1 December 1933 Borroloola, Northern Territory, Australia
- Died: 28 August 2015 (aged 81) Sydney, Australia

Playing information
Club
Years	Team	Pld	T	G	FG	P
1953–55	Rochdale Hornets	37	19	37	0	131
1955–57	Blackpool Borough	56	20	37	0	134
1957–58	Salford	46	28	90	0	264
1958–59	Workington Town	26	15	17	0	79
	Total	165	82	181	0	608

Wally McArthur (1 December 1933 – 28 August 2015) was an Aboriginal Australian rugby league footballer and track and field athlete. In 2008, the centenary of rugby league in Australia, he was named in the Aboriginal Australian rugby league team of the Century.

He was a member of the Stolen Generations.

== Biography ==
McArthur was born in 1933 in Borroloola in the Northern Territory, until he was removed from his family and sent to The Bungalow in Alice Springs. McArthur is the younger cousin of John Kundereri Moriarty who was taken from the same area.

During World War II he was evacuated to NSW and later, after the war he moved down to Adelaide, South Australia, in the early 1950s. There he lived at St Francis House boys boarding home and became a noted short-distance runner.

McArthur was also interested in playing Australian rules football, but was denied this because of a "colour bar". Rugby historian Sean Fagan and Australian journalist John Pilger have claimed that McArthur was not selected for the Australian track team at the 1952 Summer Olympics because of racial discrimination, but this has been disputed.

"There's lad up at Hornets who can catch pigeons. You've got to see him," he said. The lad was flying Aboriginal winger Wally McArthur

McArthur played in the South Australian Rugby League and Western Australia Rugby League before moving to England in November 1953 to sign for Rochdale Hornets. He went on to play a total of 165 games in English rugby league with Rochdale Hornets, Blackpool Borough, Salford and Workington Town. He returned to Australia in 1959.
