= Lionel Fogarty =

Australian indigenous poet and political activist (1958–2026)

Lionel Fogarty (1958 – 12 February 2026), also published as Lionel Lacey, was an Indigenous Australian poet and political activist.

== Early life ==
Fogarty was born in 1958 on an Aboriginal reserve at Barambah (now called Cherbourg) in Queensland, where he grew up. He was of the Yoogum (Yugambeh) and Kudjela (?) peoples.

== Activism ==
Fogarty was involved in Aboriginal activism from his teenage years, including involvement with such organisations as Aboriginal Legal Service, Aboriginal Housing Service, Black Resource Centre, Black Community School and Murrie Coo-ee. He worked mainly in southern Queensland on issues such as land rights, Aboriginal health and deaths in custody. His brother, Daniel Yock, died in the back of a police van shortly after being arrested in 1993.

He met activist Cheryl Buchanan (born 1955), later the mother of his six children, in Melbourne, who was working with the National Union of Australian University Students (NUAUS). He assisted in publishing the newspaper Black News Service (1975–1977), originally out of the Black Resource Centre (BRC) in Melbourne (supported by the NUAUS) and later from Brisbane. Buchanan had been involved in the setup of the Aboriginal Tent Embassy in 1972, and became inaugural director of the BRC. The centre later moved to Brisbane. Buchanan also took him up to Aurukun festival and to meet Mapoon people whose land near Weipa had been taken from them in the 1930s and 1940s.

The BRC was involved in the defence and acquittal of the "Brisbane Three" in 1975. Fogarty was one of the three: he faced charges of conspiracy against the state in Brisbane, along with Denis Walker and Chilean national John Garcia. The charges, which had been laid by then premier of Queensland Joh Bjelke-Petersen's Special Branch in 1974, were on various offences relating to an alleged plot to "kidnap" Jim Varghese, students' union president at the University of Queensland.

After this, Fogarty started writing on political issues.

As well as travelling around Australia promoting Murri culture and Aboriginal causes, in 1976 he travelled to the Second International Indian Treaty Council in South Dakota, United States, part of the American Indian Movement. In the International Year for the World's Indigenous People in 1993, Fogarty went on an extensive tour in Europe, reading his work.

== Poetry ==
Fogarty's poetry can be seen as an extension of this activism; common themes include the maintenance of traditional Aboriginal culture and the effects of European occupation. His work has been described as "experimental", and sometimes "surrealist". He uses Aboriginal language in his poetry, partly as an attempt to extend the dialogue between Australian cultures.

He was involved with not-for-profit poetry organisation, The Red Room Company, participating in Unlocked, a program for inmates in New South Wales correctional centres, as well its creative projects including Clubs and Societies and The Poet's Life Works.

== Death ==
Fogarty died on 12 February 2026, at the age of 68.

== Recognition and awards ==
- 2025: Red Ochre Award for Lifetime Achievement
- 2023: Shortlisted, Prime Minister's Literary Awards, Poetry Award for Harvest Lingo
- 2023: Winner, Queensland Literary Awards, Judith Wright Calanthe Award for a Poetry Collection for Harvest Lingo
- 2023: Shortlisted, New South Wales Premier's Literary Awards, Indigenous Writers' Prize
- 2023: Shortlisted, Victorian Premier's Literary Award for Indigenous Writing for Harvest Lingo
- 2016: Shortlisted, New South Wales Premier's Literary Awards, Kenneth Slessor Prize for Poetry
- 2015: Kate Challis RAKA Award for Mogwie-Idan: Stories of the Land (2012)
- 2014: Shortlisted, Victorian Premier's Literary Awards, Prize for Indigenous writing
- 2012: Scanlon Prize for Indigenous Poetry, for Connection Requital.
- 2006: Australian Council for the Arts – Promotional And Presentation Grant Award Literature Board
- 2996: Nominated, NBC Banjo Awards, Poetry Prize, for New and Selected poems: Munaldjali, Mutuerjararera
- 1995: Australian Council for the Arts – Travel Grant Award, toward promotional activities in the UK, Italy and Spain
- 1994: Queensland OPAL Award – Murri Achievement (Writers) Award
- 1988: FAW Patricia Weickhardt Award to an Aboriginal Writer

== Selected works ==
Fogarty's works include:

- Harvest Lingo (Giramondo, 2022)
- Selected Works 1980-2016 (re.press, 2017)
- Eelahroo (Long Ago) Nyah (Looking) Möbö-Möbö (Future) (Vagabond Press, 2014)
- Mogwie-Idan: Stories of the Land (Vagabond Press, 2012)
- Connection Requital (Vagabond Press, 2010)
- Yerrabilela Jimbelung: Poems About Friends and Family, with Yvette Walker and Kargun Fogarty (Keeaira Press, 2008)
- Minyung Woolah Binnung: What Saying Says (Keeaira Press, 2004)
- New and Selected Poems: Munaldjali, Mutuerjaraera (Hyland House, 1995)
- Booyooburra: A Tale of the Wakka Murri with illustrations by Sharon Hodgson (Hyland House, 1993)
- Jagera (Murri Coo-ee, 1990)
- Ngutji (Murri Coo-ee, 1984)
- Kudjela (Murri Coo-ee, 1983)
- Yoogum Yoogum (Penguin, 1982)
- Kargun (Murri Coo-ee, 1980)
