= Malcolm Cooper (footballer) =

Australian footballer and Indigenous activist

Playing career
Years	Club	Games (Goals)
1954–1955	Port Adelaide	5

Malcolm Cooper was an Aboriginal Australian Australian rules footballer who played for Port Adelaide during the 1950s, and a social activist.

== Early life and education ==
Cooper spent his boyhood years at St Francis House in Semaphore South, a beachside suburb of Adelaide near Port Adelaide, South Australia. There he was treated with kindness, sent to the local school, and met other future Aboriginal leaders and activists, including Gordon Briscoe, John Kundereri Moriarty, Richie Bray, Vince Copley, Charles Perkins, and others.

== Football ==
Cooper was noticed as an up-and-coming player in the junior ranks, winning the "most improved" award for Port Adelaide Colts in 1953. He is considered the first Indigenous Australian to play senior football for Port Adelaide in the South Australian National Football League (SANFL). (Harry Hewitt did represent the club in an interstate match against Victorian club Fitzroy in 1891 but that was not an SANFL fixture.)

Cooper was also the first Aboriginal footballer to play for the Port Adelaide Football Club in a Grand Final, the seven-point loss to West Torrens in the 1953 Grand Final. He played 5 SANFL games between 1954 and 1955.

== Social activism ==
Cooper met and lobbied Prime Minister Sir Robert Menzies in 1963 in Canberra as part of a delegation to promote justice for Aboriginal people, and in 1964 founded the Aborigines' Progress Association in Adelaide, becoming its first president. The association was formed in response to perceptions that the South Australian Aborigines' Advancement League of South Australia was dominated by non-Aboriginal members, lessening the voice of Indigenous Australians politically.

== Death ==
Cooper died prematurely of a brain haemorrhage in his twenties or thirties after being flown up to Darwin from Tennant Creek.
