= George Abdullah =

Aboriginal community leader

- Born: 9 August 1919; Guildford, Western Australia
- Died: 6 August 1984 (aged 64); Nedlands, Western Australia
- Occupation(s): Community worker, Indigenous rights activist, soldier

George Cyril Abdullah (9 August 1919 – 6 August 1984) was an Aboriginal community leader who promoted Indigenous rights by participating in a number of organisations and committees in Perth, Western Australia.

== Early life ==
Abdullah was born in Guildford, a suburb of Perth, and was the youngest of the five children of Joseph Benedict Abdul, a labourer from Kolkata, and Mary Salina, an Indigenous woman.

In 1944, Abdullah married Gladys Kelly in a Catholic ceremony at the mission in New Norcia.

== Political activities ==
Abdullah started working with South Australian Railways in 1946. While working with the railways as a labourer, truck driver, and linesman, he started promoting Aboriginal rights. He went on to become a freelance welfare worker for Aboriginal people, travelling across the country speaking about the plight of Indigenous Australians.

He was involved in the formation of a number of Indigenous rights groups, including the Coolbaroo League, the Original Australians Welfare and Progress Association, and the Western Australia Native Welfare Council (later the Aboriginal Advancement Council of Western Australia). In the 1970s he was involved in the foundation of the Aboriginal Rights Council (later the Aboriginal Rights League), the National Tribal Council, and the Aboriginal Development and Cultural Council. He ran unsuccessfully for the Senate as an independent in 1975.

He was a member of the committee of the Aboriginal Publications Foundation, which published the magazine Identity, in the 1970s.

== Death and legacy ==
Abdullah died on 6 August 1984 at Nedlands, Perth, of a heart disease.
