= Nancy Prasad =

Australian woman of Indo-Fijian descent

Nancy Prasad is an Australian woman of Indo-Fijian descent who as a child was the centre of a deportation drama in Australia.

On August 6, 1965, the five-year-old Prasad was scheduled for deportation to Fiji from Sydney Airport. However, Charles Perkins, an Aboriginal Australian activist, staged a fake "kidnapping" of Prasad, taking her from immigration officials at the airport. Perkins' intent was to highlight what he viewed as the injustice of the country’s "White Australia" immigration policy. Many Australian newspapers covered the event. The next day, Prasad was deported to Fiji.

In March 1973, Prasad was allowed to immigrate into Australia. A Daily Telegraph article in August 2015 described her role in Australian immigration policy history.
