= Kerry Reed-Gilbert =

Australian poet and Aboriginal rights activist

Kerry Reed-Gilbert (24 October 1956 – 13 July 2019) was an Australian poet, author, collector, editor, educator, a champion of Indigenous writers and an Aboriginal rights activist. She was a Wiradjuri woman.

== Early life ==
Born on 24 October 1956 in central New South Wales, Reed-Gilbert was orphaned at three months old when her father Kevin Gilbert murdered her mother Gomah Gilbert (née Scott). Reed-Gilbert was raised by her father's sister, whom Reed-Gilbert called "Mummy", and she became the youngest of eight children.

Reed-Gilbert was a Wiradjuri woman and her childhood memoirs are published in The Cherry Picker's Daughter: A childhood memoir.

== Career ==
Reed-Gilbert wrote poetry and prose and was actively involved in writers groups and publishing the work of Aboriginal, Torres Strait Islander and Māori writers.

She was the co-founder and inaugural Chairperson of the First Nations Australia Writers Network (FNAWN). She was also a member of the Aboriginal Studies Press Advisory Committee. Reed-Gilbert was instrumental in strengthening the governance of Us Mob Writing group to where she was a member and the chairperson.

== Awards ==
- 2003: Aboriginal and Torres Strait Islander Arts Board fellowship for poetry and writing at Omi International Arts Center in New York.
- 2006: ‘Outstanding Achievement in Poetry’ and ‘Poet of Merit’ Award from the International Society of Poets.

== Other activities ==
Reed-Gilbert collected Aboriginalia, a variety of prints, figurines, plates, ashtrays, badges, and velvet paintings of Aboriginal people or featuring Aboriginal motifs. In 2016 this collection was acquired by AIATSIS.

She presented an episode of the 2013 documentary television series Desperate Measures, about her father, activist and writer Kevin Gilbert.

== Death and legacy ==
Reed-Gilbert died on 13 July 2019 in Canberra. She was survived by her two daughters, Lesa and Melanie, her grandchildren Jirrima, Yarran, Tenisha, Kaylarnie and Yullara and her great-grandchildren.

In 2020 the Kuracca Prize for Australian Literature was created by Overland literary journal in memory of Reed-Gilbert.

== Works ==
Reed-Gilbert's poetry was translated into Dutch, French, Bengali and Korean. Reed-Gilbert edited a number of anthologies of poetry and prose.

- Reed-Gilbert, Kerry (1996), Black woman, black life, Wakefield Press, ISBN 978-1-86254-392-8
- Reed-Gilbert, Kerry, ed. (November 2017), A pocketful of leadership in First Nations Australia communities (Third ed.), KLaS (published 2018), ISBN 978-0-9925598-1-6
- Bedford, Michelle; Delian, Lyndy; Dries, Jenny; Faulkner, Samantha; Fuller, Lisa; Graham, Joyce; Leane, Jeanine; Martiniello, Jennifer A. (Jennifer Avriel), 1949–; Miller, Elizabeth; Reed-Gilbert, Kerry; Seiver, Beverley; Weston, Richard, b. 1938; Us Mob Writing (2013), By close of business, Us Mob Writing, ISBN 978-0-9923136-0-9
- Blank, Anton; Reed-Gilbert, Kerry, eds. (2013), Ora nui : special edition : a collection of Maori and Aboriginal literature (Special ed.), Anton Blank, ISBN 978-0-473-26137-5
- Reed-Gilbert, Kerry (2002), Talkin about country, Kuracca Communications, ISBN 978-0-9580588-0-3
- Reed-Gilbert, Kerry (2019), Cherry picker's daughter : a childhood memoir, WILD DINGO PRESS, ISBN 978-1-925893-09-0
- Reed-Gilbert, Kerry (2018), 'The Little Town on the Railway Track', Growing Up Aboriginal In Australia, Black Inc, ISBN 9781863959810
