= Pioneer Theatre =

Building in Alice Springs, Northern Territory, Australia

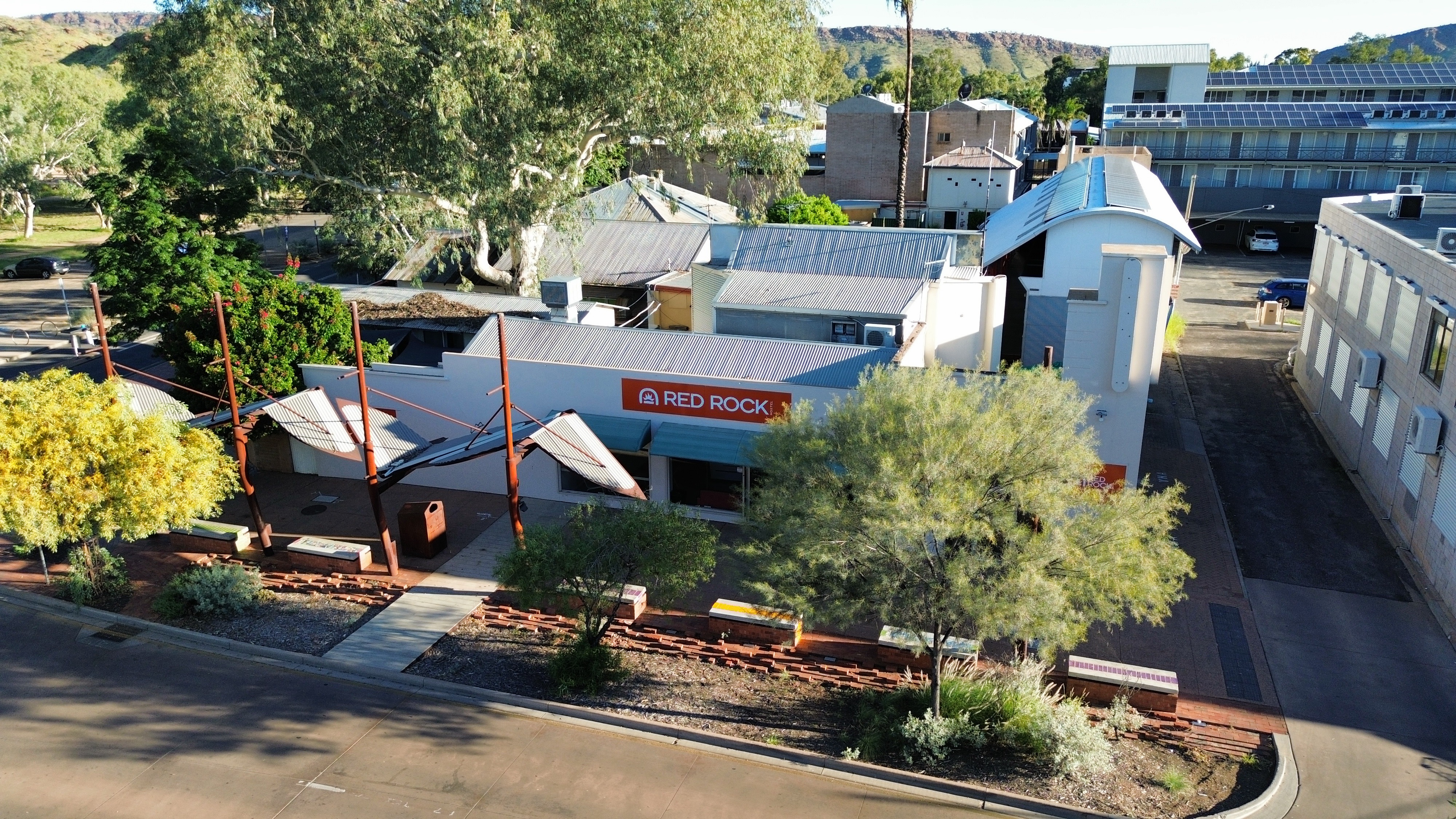
- Red Rock Hostel in 2026

- Location within Northern Territory
- Address: 26 Parsons Street, Alice Springs
- Coordinates: 23°41′58″S 133°53′02″E

Construction
- Opened: 1942
- Closed: 1984

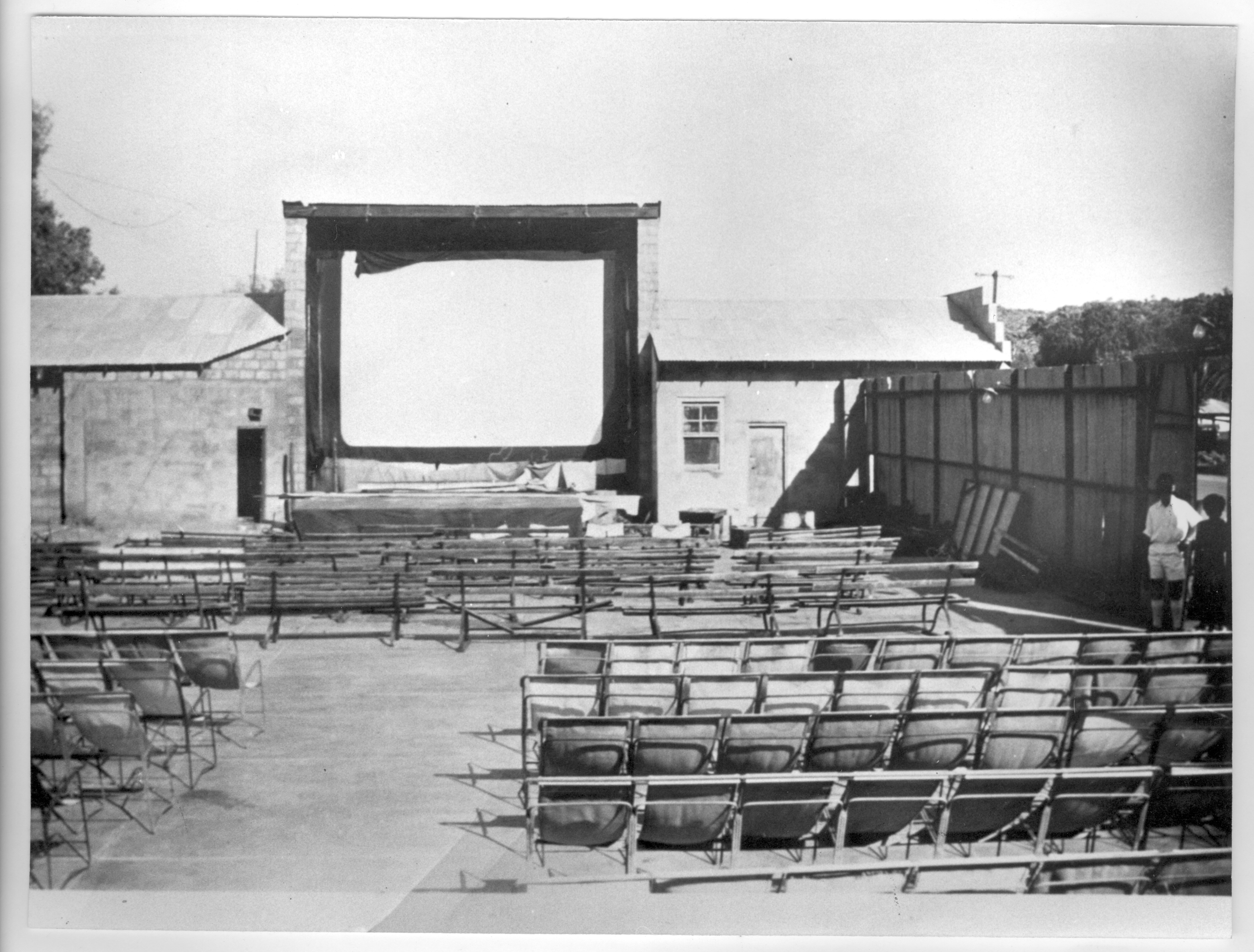
Inside the Pioneer Theatre, c. 1930s

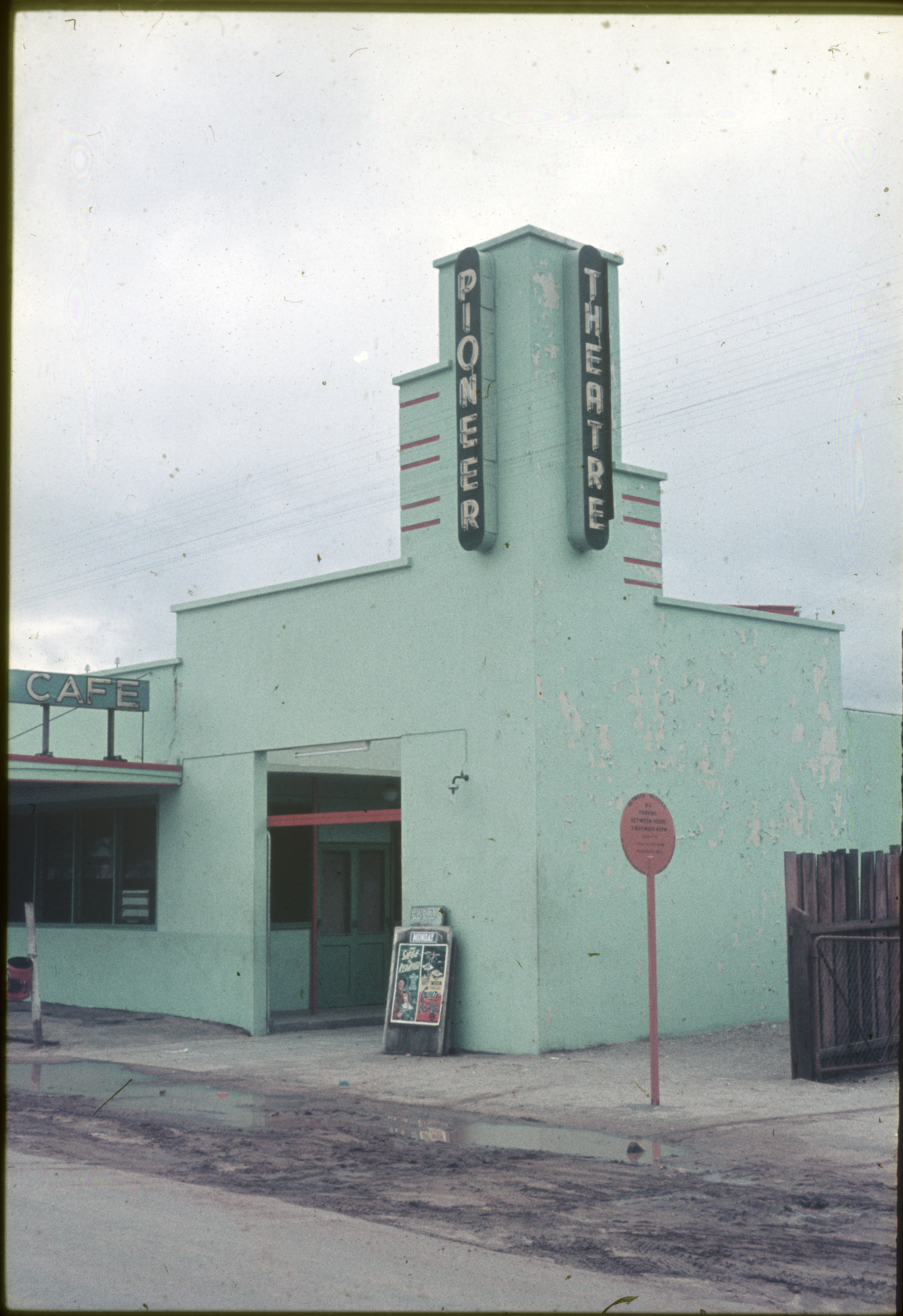
Pioneer Theatre in 1957 or 1958

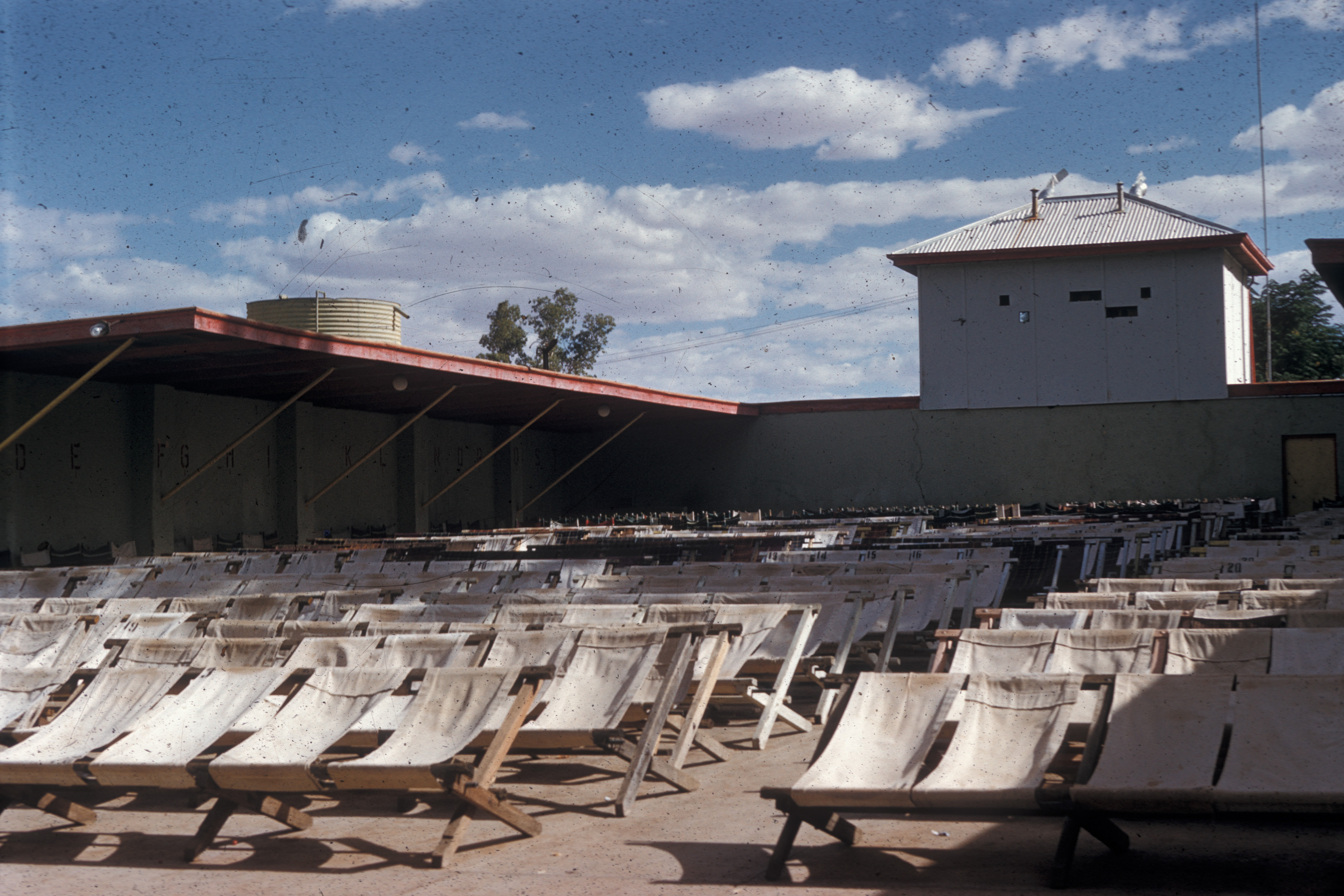
The chairs inside the Pioneer Theatre, c.1970s

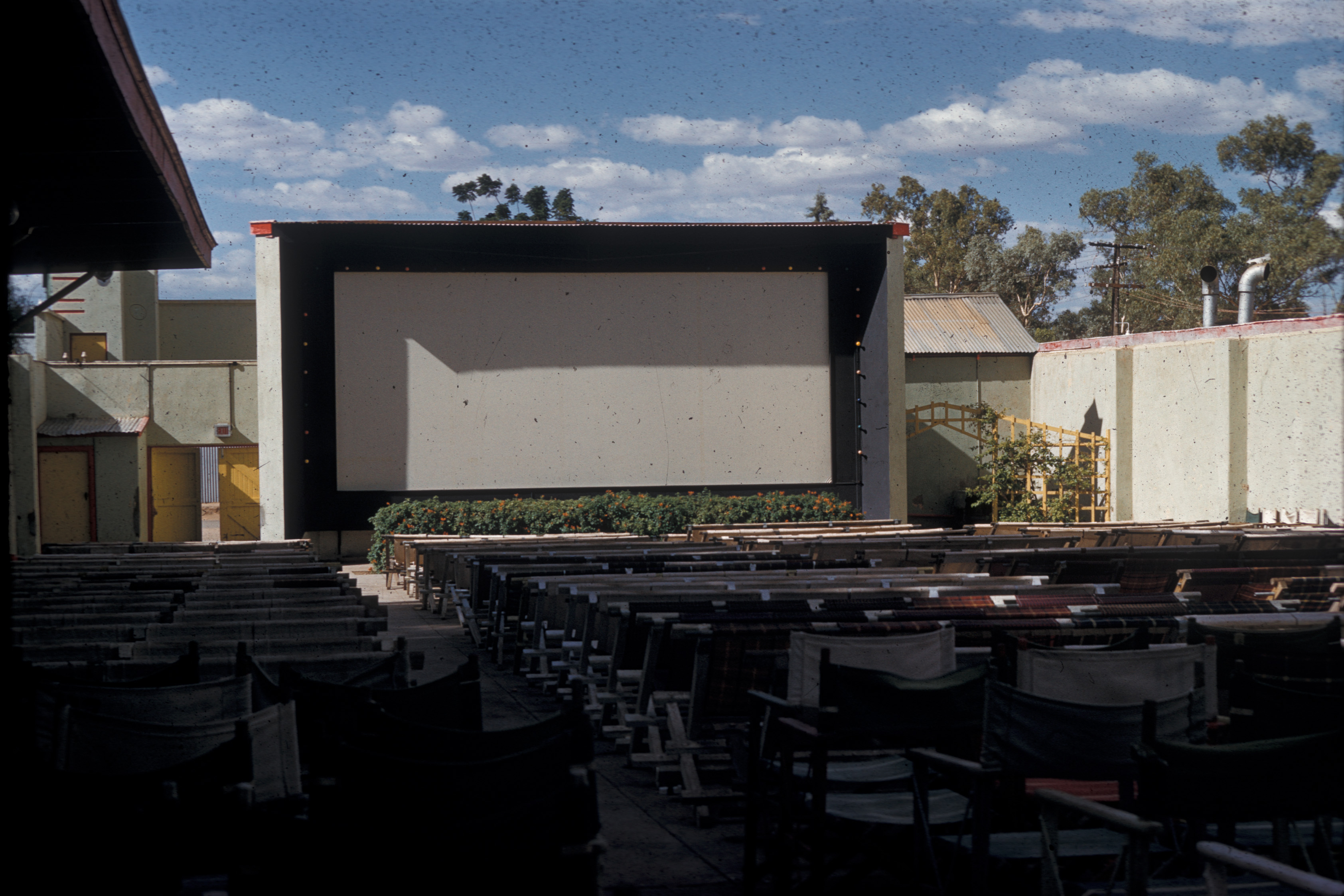
The screen inside the Pioneer Theatre, c.1970s

The Pioneer Theatre, also known as "Pioneer Walk-In Theatre" and "Snow Kenna's Walk-In Picture Theatre", was a theatre in the Northern Territory of Australia located in Alice Springs. The building was built by Leslie 'Snow' Kenna in 1942 and closed, as a theatre, in 1984 and operated as YHA Alice Springs. In 2025, the property was sold and the Alice Springs YHA ceased operating under that name. It now operates as Red Rock Hostel.

== History ==
Leslie Kenna, known almost universally as Snow, arrived in Alice Springs in the latter half of 1936 with motion picture equipment and “a tonne of nitrate picture film”. Kenna very soon started showing movies at the Welfare Hall before the Capitol Theatre was opened by his friend, and landlord Ly Underdown who Kenna leased it from.

Movies were a very important part of the social life of people in Alice Springs at this time; especially because. from 1928 - 1964 Aboriginal people were only allowed into the "town-limits" during daylight hours for medical attention, and only to attend "the pictures" in the evenings.

In 1942 Kenna built his own theatre, Pioneer Theatre, on Parsons Street, which had no roof as there was no air-conditioning in town and this, in combination with the deck chairs provided, kept keep people cool. In winter, when minus temperatures are reached, people brought blankets, hot water bottles and flasks of coffee. Frequently dogs, from the outlying town-camps, wandered into the Theatre with their Aboriginal owners and provided an entertainment of their own.

Important events in the Theatres operation were:

- 1955; The Alice Springs premiere of the film Jedda, an Australian classic which starred local girl Rose Kgarla Kunoth (later known as Rosalie Kunoth-Monks) and much of the film was shot in Central Australia.
- The Alice Springs premier of 'A Town Like Alice' in 1956, image features Peter Finch and Gough Whitlam.
  1956; The 'bush' premiere of A Town Like Alice which was partially filmed in Alice Springs. This was apparently a very relaxed occasion and, during the intermission, Arrernte men from Hermannsburg, sung in the Arrernte language; it was said that "Hollywood would have been horrified". In attendance were: Peter Finch (who brought the air hostess from his flight to Alice Springs, Beryl Oliver, as his date), Nevil Shute, Jock Nelson and Gough Whitlam. This event raised almost £1000; all of which Kenna gave to the Royal Flying Doctors Service.

Kenna died in August 1965 and the Kenna family continued to run the theatre, and the Pioneer Drive-In Picture Theatre (which Kenna had established in 1957) until the early 1970s when they sold them the Greater Union Theatres. Greater Union Theatres only opened the Pioneer Theatre on Saturday nights and, for many years, new releases would be shown first here before opening at the drive-in.

Following a decline in demand, the Theatre was closed in early 1984 and, on the 8th of December 1984, Major Leslie Oldfield opened "Pioneer Market Place", a grocery, and one of the two dozen shops opened on the property. This was, however, short lived, and in 1986 the Theatre was threatened with demolition but, following intervention from the National Trust of Australia (Northern Territory), and the YHA's interest in buying the property in 1988 it was saved.

It is one of the few surviving World War II era buildings remaining in Alice Springs and it is believed to be the last known example of its kind in the Northern Territory.

The former theatre was nominated in 1994 for inclusion on the Northern Territory Heritage Register, but the nomination lapsed in 2013 after the owner declined to agree to have the building listed.
