= Charlie King (sports broadcaster) =

Australian sports broadcaster

Charlie King AM is an Indigenous Australian sports commentator and award-winning anti-family violence campaigner working in Darwin in the Northern Territory of Australia. He is of Gurindji descent.

== Media ==
King is a commentator for ABC Radio's Grandstand sport program based in Darwin. He commentates on various sports including Australian rules football and cricket.

At the 2006 Commonwealth Games, he was the lawn bowls commentator for ABC radio. King was a commentator at the 2008 Beijing Olympics for ABC, becoming the first Indigenous Australian to commentate at an Olympic Games.

== Community work ==
King has worked in child protection for more than 25 years, volunteering as an independent person supporting children without a parent or guardian in trouble with the law. He established the 'No More' initiative in 2006, which used sport to campaign against family violence in Australia.

King was awarded an Order of Australia Medal (OAM) for his service to broadcast media and the Indigenous community in 2015, and was upgraded to Member of the Order of Australia (AM) at the 2021 Queen's Birthday Honours for significant service to the Indigenous community of the Northern Territory. In 2016, King won a Northern Territory human rights award. In 2025, he was awarded National Sports Media Representative of the Year at the National Aboriginal and Torres Strait Islander Sports Awards.
