= Percy Knight =

Australian rugby league footballer (1954–2025)

Personal information
- Full name: Percy Montgomery Knight
- Born: 29 September 1954 Condobolin, New South Wales, Australia
- Died: 6 April 2025 (aged 70)

Playing information
- Position: Five-eighth, Halfback
Club
Years	Team	Pld	T	G	FG	P
1976	Widnes	3	0	0	0	0
1978–82	Balmain	64	11	0	0	33
1983–84	Canberra Raiders	22	4	0	0	16
	Total	89	15	0	0	49
Representative
Years	Team	Pld	T	G	FG	P
1977	NSW Country	1	0	0	0	0
- Source: As of 17 May 2019

Percy Montgomery Knight (29 September 1954 – 6 April 2025) was an Australian rugby league footballer who played in the 1970s and 1980s. He played for the Balmain Tigers and Canberra Raiders in the New South Wales Rugby League (NSWRL) competition.

== Background ==
Knight was a Wiradjuri man born and raised in Condobolin, New South Wales. He played junior rugby league in his hometown before moving to Canberra. In 1976, he had a brief spell with English rugby league club Widnes. In 1977, Knight represented NSW Country against a touring Great Britain side. Knight then gained the attention of a few Sydney clubs, including Balmain, who signed him.

== Playing career ==
Knight made his first grade debut for Balmain against Manly in Round 6 1978 at Brookvale Oval. Knight was a part of the Balmain side which won the reserve grade premiership in 1978. In 1980, Knight captained Balmain on occasion and the side managed to reach the Tooth Cup final against Parramatta. In 1981, Balmain endured a horror year on the field and finished last, claiming the wooden spoon after winning only 6 games all season.

At the end of 1982, Knight decided to join Canberra after being approached by coach Don Furner. Knight spent 2 seasons at Canberra but struggled with injuries in his time there. Knight retired as a player following the end of the 1984 season.

== Post playing ==
Knight went on to become a coach for the Under 17 Canberra side and also an Indigenous worker becoming chairman of the WCC (Wiradjuri Condobolin Culture).
