= Ly Underdown =

Hotelier and businessman in the Northern Territory, Australia

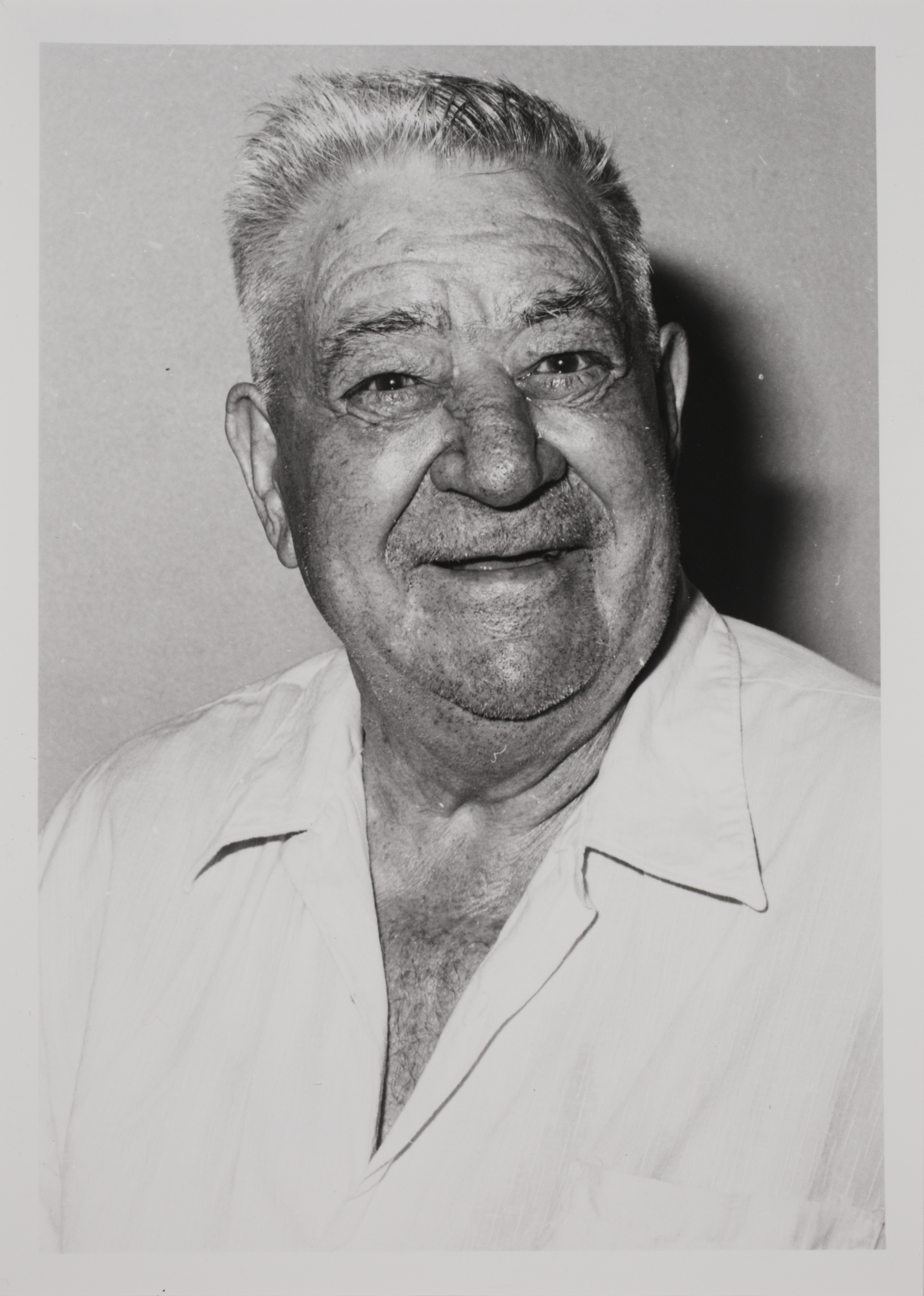
Lycurgus Underdown in 1979

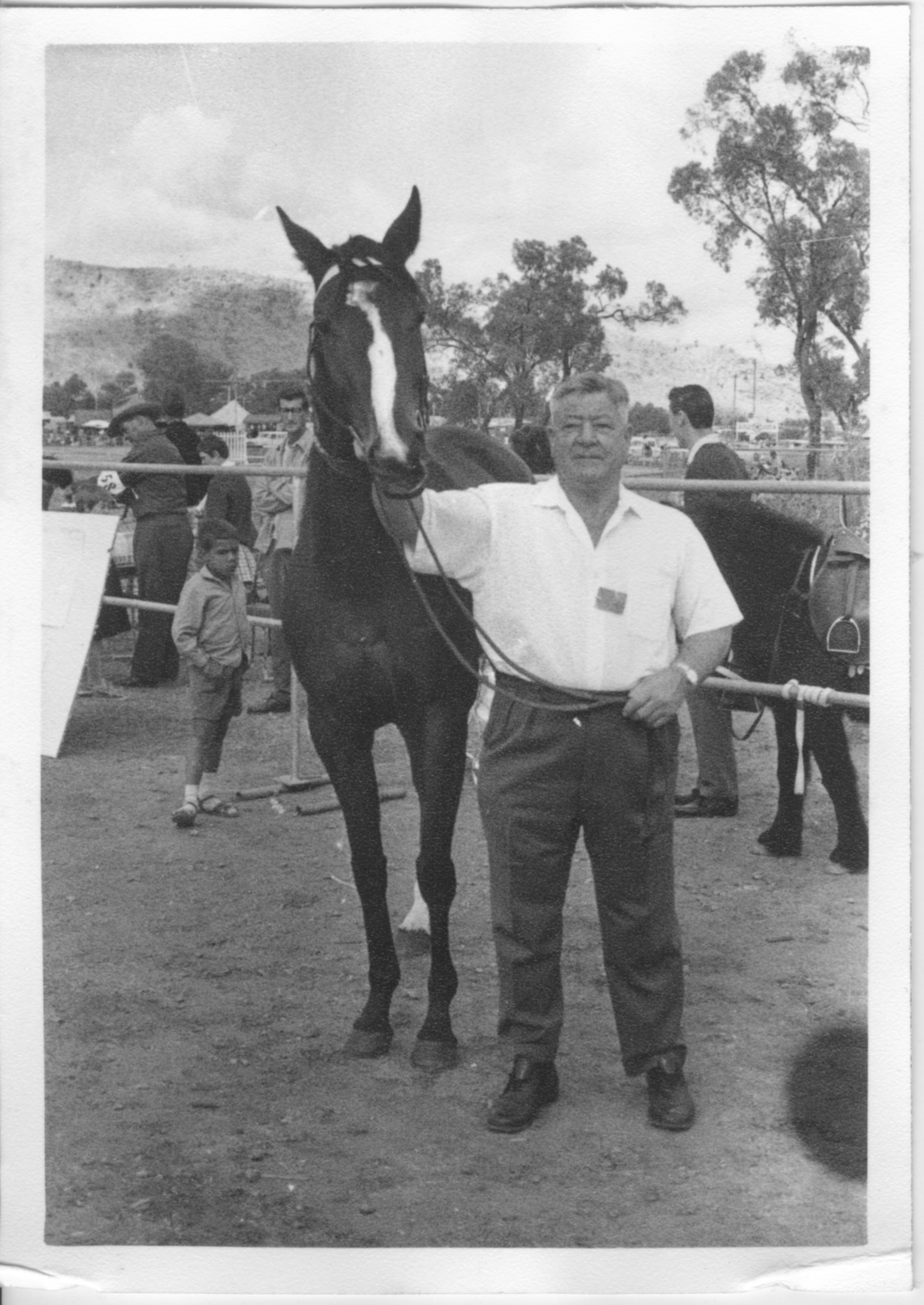
Underdown and his horse

Lycurgus John Rickard Underdown (28 August 1904 - 4 November 1984), generally known as "Uncle" Ly Underdown, was a prominent hotelier and businessman in Alice Springs, in the Northern Territory, Australia.

== Life in the Northern Territory ==
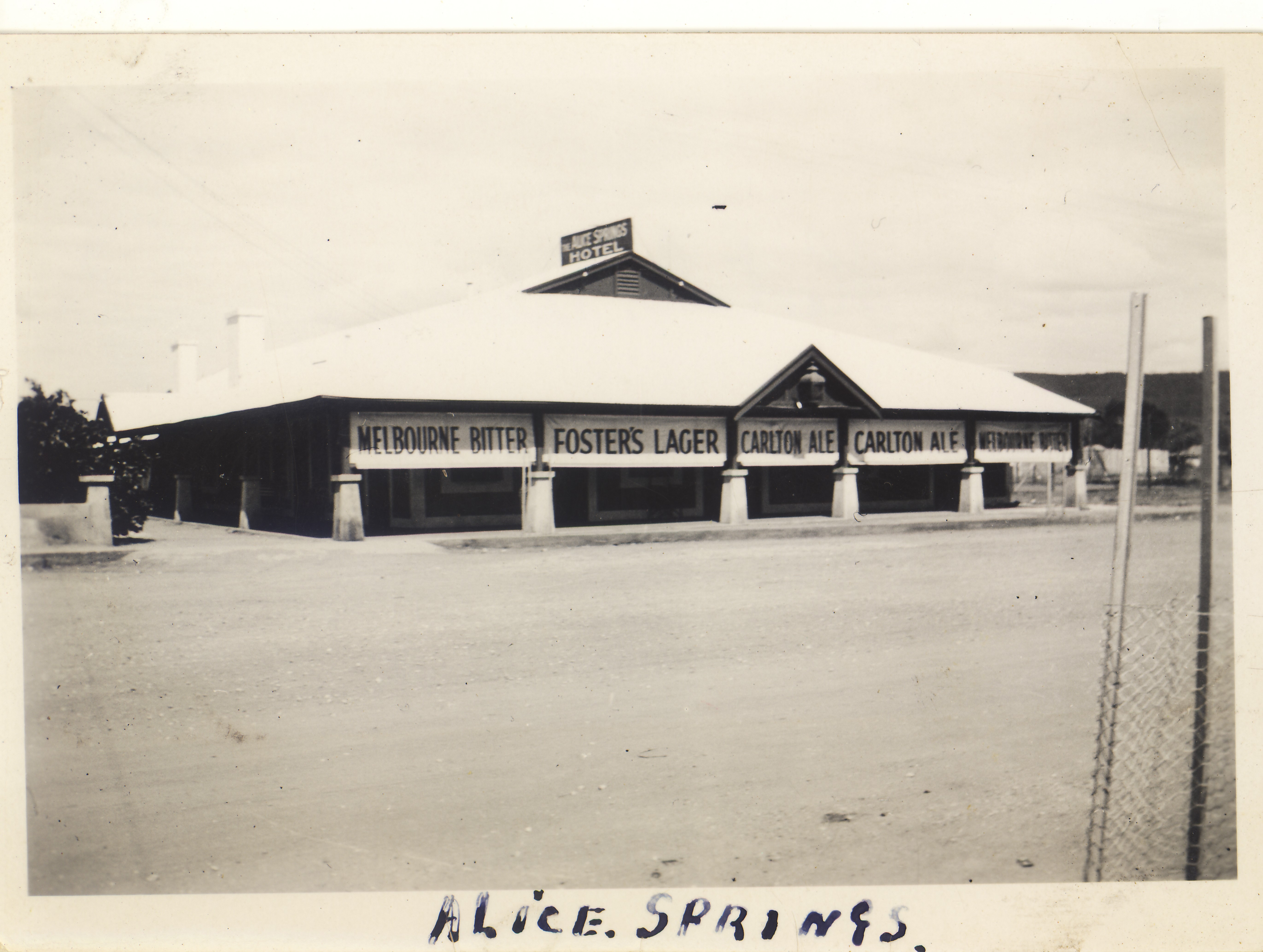
Ly Underdown's 'The Alice Springs Hotel', photo taken between 1938 and 1948

Underdown was born at Oodnadatta where his family operated cattle stations. As a young man his father advised him that there was "no future in the cattle industry" and advised him to look for something else. Because of this advice, in around 1924, Underdown opened a store between in Oodnadatta where, with the extension of the railway line, he became one of the main suppliers to the railway gangs.

This was short-lived, in 1927 he moved to Alice Springs with his family, this was after a long period of drought forced them from the station. In Alice Springs Underdown established a new grocery store in 1929. The Alice Springs township, at this point, experiencing a period of growth with the arrival of the railway line and, alongside his parents Underdown developed the store site into a hotel.

The hotel, the Alice Springs Hotel, also served as the second pub (the original being the Stuart Arms Hotel) and it was completed in 1933. Underdowns father would also establish the Capitol Theatre on Gregory Terrace (opposite the hotel) which was an open-air picture theater. The population of Alice Springs expanded significantly during World War II and Ly and his mother Daisy decided that, with all the word of mouth and publicity from the soldiers there would be a tourist boom in the town. Together they decided to expand the then small hotel into a much larger two-storey hotel (the building of that height in the town) that would have 55 rooms and 36 bathrooms. This was a very modern building for its time and was known for never ending additions including its roof-top cricket pitch which Underdown, a keen sportsman, had insisted on. This cricket pitch was opened in 1958 by Jock Nelson.

In 1979 Underdown sold the hotel and it was renamed the Telford Alice Hotel. It would burn down on 3 November 1984; Underdown died the following day knowing nothing of the fire.

== Legacy ==
Underdown donated significant collections of materials to Library & Archives NT which are held in Alice Springs. These include business records relating to Hotel Alice Springs (NTRS 2196), a typecript of his memoris (NTRS 355) and various photograph collections.

Underdown Street, in Gillen, is named for the family.
