= Richie Bray =

Australian rules footballer (died 2017)

Personal information
- Full name: Richard W. Bray
- Died: November 2017

Playing career
Years	Club	Games (Goals)
1959, 1962-1966	Port Adelaide	77 (65)

Career highlights
- 3x Port Adelaide premiership player (1962, 1963, 1965)

Richard W. Bray (died 2017), known as Richie Bray, was an Aboriginal Australian rules footballer who played for the Port Adelaide Football Club.

== Early life and education ==
As a child, Bray was a resident of St Francis House, a home for inland Aboriginal Australian boys from 1946 to 1959 in the Adelaide suburb of Semaphore South, a beachside suburb of Adelaide near Port Adelaide, South Australia. There he was treated with kindness, sent to the local school, and met other future Aboriginal leaders and activists, including Gordon Briscoe, John Kundereri Moriarty, Charles Perkins, Vince Copley, Malcolm Cooper, and others.

== Football career ==
Bray played a single game for Port Adelaide F.C. in 1959, then moved to Alice Springs for a few years.

In 1962 Bray played in his first premiership for the club, and also played in the 1963 and 1965 premiership sides under coach Fos Williams. Over the eight years he spent at the club, he played 77 games. He mostly played half forward flank, and kicked 65 goals, but in the 1962 Grand Final (when Port Adelaide won the Grand Final against West Adelaide), he played on the wing.

He also coached locally at the Semaphore Football Club.

== Death ==
He died in November 2017.
