= Kevin Gilbert (author) =

20th-century Aboriginal Australian writer

- Born: 10 July 1933; Condobolin, New South Wales
- Died: 1 April 1993 (aged 59)
- Occupations: Writer, poet, activist, artist, playwright and printmaker
- Writing career
- Notable works: The Cherry Pickers; Living Black: Blacks Talk to Kevin Gilbert; Black from the Edge
- Notable awards: The National Book Council; 1977; Human Rights Award for Literature; 1988

Kevin John Gilbert (10 July 1933 – 1 April 1993) was an Aboriginal Australian author, activist, artist, poet, playwright and printmaker. A Wiradjuri man, Gilbert was born on the banks of the Lachlan River in New South Wales. Gilbert was the first Aboriginal playwright and printmaker. He was an active human rights defender and was involved in the establishment of the Aboriginal Tent Embassy in 1972 as well as various protests to advocate for Aboriginal Australian sovereignty.

Gilbert won the 1978 National Book Council prize for writers, for Living Black: Blacks Talk to Kevin Gilbert (1977).

== Early life ==
Gilbert was the youngest of eight children, born on 10 July 1933 to a Wiradjuri mother Rachel Naden and an English father John Gilbert. He was born on the bank of the Kalara/ Lachlan River just outside Condobolin in New South Wales and at age seven he and his siblings were orphaned. He was raised by his eldest sisters and extended family on an Aboriginal reserve. He left school at the age of thirteen and picked up various seasonal and short-term itinerant jobs.

His book Me and Mary Kangaroo reflect a childhood of intimate connection to his mother's Wiradjuri country. and Child’s Dreaming

His extended family would annually travel on the fruit-picking circuit within Wiradjuri territory as "…a temporary release from near starvation … and above all, it meant some independence, some freedom, from under the crucifying heels of the local police and the white station managers; an escape from refugee camps called 'Aboriginal reserves'".

On 12 June 1954, he married Goma Scott. In 1957, Gilbert murdered Goma, apparently because of her infidelity. He received a life sentence. In prison, he educated himself and developed his artistic talents. He was released on parole after 14 years.

In his own words:

"As a Black artist with all the contemptible misery and heart burnings of a poet, I suffered sitting in white dominated classrooms of rural Australia while white teachers lasciviously railed about ‘naked’ Aboriginals, who were described as heathen, too ignorant to know the basic manner of impregnating females, ‘whistle-cock’ sub-incisions, murderous, cannibals, no law or government, minute cerebral indices etc., only to be latterly ‘saved’ by the ‘glorious’ forefather pioneers who attempted to ‘smooth the dying pillow’ of the ‘pitiful remnants’.

Asking questions, demanding answers and making refutations, we were inevitably sent from the classrooms to go out and sweep the yards, pick up scraps, clean the toilets, for, to conform with the late 1940s and 50s white dream of ‘assimilation’, we had to be made to prove we were incapable of any higher educational potential, save that of achieving fourth class primary level. And we had to conform to work patterns. White Australia, like its corrupt confrere white South Africa and America, wanted Black houseboys to service their peculiar life styles.

"I attained a fourth class primary education level before leaving school at fourteen. Only in prison did I finally have access to reading materials. I attended an art class to try and paint a recurrent image in my mind of an old Aboriginal sitting at the entrance of a cave filled with painted images, while looking out and down over a wide valley filled with eagles. Of course I couldn’t afford oil paints, so I started with lino prints, and was most pleased with the imagery and body involvement of utilizing that medium to protest the continual victimization and genocide against Blacks. I was lucky enough to be able to scrounge some old lino from the prison workshops, inks from the prison printing shop, and had the good fortune of being in the printing section when a reasonably humane guard was in charge and graciously turned a blind eye to my extravagant use of inks, printing paper and to the fact that I virtually tucked myself away in a quiet corner of the workshop each day and did my own thing. Initially, I had to have my poems and prints smuggled from the prison. Exhibitions of my work brought a focus of attention from the printmaking world, when the works were exhibited at the Robin Hood Gallery and the Arts Council Gallery in Sydney. The exhibitions confirmed my resolve to use my poems, writing and art to open up the question of the continuing denial and injustice against Aboriginals, in an effort to bring the reality of the white Australian inhumanity into the open."

== Art ==
In prison, Gilbert produced the first lino prints ever made by an Aboriginal artist, and were his first efforts at creative expression. He fashioned his own tools "from a spoon, fork, gem blades and nails", and carved "old brittle lino off the prison floor", creating images by rubbing the paper over the lino cuts with the back of a spoon.

After his release (around 1971), Gilbert established the Kalari Aboriginal Art Gallery near Taree, NSW.

His works have been extensively exhibited nationally and internationally in Havana, Amsterdam, Rotterdam, Boston, Massachusetts, Portland, Oregon, Durban, London, and Athens. His unique artistic style is part of the Australian National Gallery collection and is housed in other major Australian art institutions.

== Writing career ==
=== The Cherry Pickers ===
While in prison Gilbert also took up writing. In 1968 he started to pen the play The Cherry Pickers, which was smuggled out of gaol on toilet paper. It was first workshopped and presented in a reading at the small Mews Theatre in Sydney 'in the open air' with Bob Maza and other Aboriginal actors reading the parts. The play is significant that it was the first play written in English by an Aboriginal and also the first play to be performed entirely by an Aboriginal cast. The critic and publisher Katharine Brisbane, described her response after viewing an early performed reading of "The Cherry Pickers as 'I was overawed with a sense of privilege at being allowed into the domestic life of a people whose privacy had, for so long and for such good reason, been guarded from white eyes'. A more complete moved reading was held in 1970 and 1971 in Sydney and the play was subsequently nominated in 1970 for the Captain Cook Memorial Award.

The play was performed in its full form by Melbourne's Nindethana Theatre Group in 1971 and in Redfern, Sydney in 1972 but the play was not published until 1988 when, in the wake of protests against the Bicentennial celebrations of European colonisation of Australia, it became a symbol of Aboriginal protest. Gilbert's play is based on the stories and experiences of itinerant workers and it deals with, as Gilbert puts it in an introduction to the play written in 1969: ... spiritual searching and loss, my people pushed into refugee situations, desocialised if you like. The play's narrative mixes traditional creation myths, rituals, political diatribes, clever dialogue and humour. It is through this humour that Gilbert explores alcoholism, violence and spiritual and cultural issues. Gilbert also exhibited his artwork at the Arts Council Gallery in Sydney in 1970, in an exhibition organised by the Australia Council.

Particularly in his early verse, Gilbert uses the poetry as an apologia in respect to his own life whilst challenging the morality of the wider society.

=== Other writing ===
He authored Because a White Man'll Never Do It in 1973.

In 1972, another play by Gilbert, The Gods Look Down, was produced at the Wayside Theatre, a small alternative theatre in Sydney. The production, directed by Barry Donnelly, is described as a dance drama. Gilbert's notes for the program, describe it as "an emotional fantasy using subconsciously emotive scenes based on modern spiritual drift and identity loss, which is actually the present search for a spiritual force or a god". The play is poetic and semi-abstract and moves from dialogue accompanied by movement to movement-based explorations of love and sexuality.

Along with his political work which was about the Aboriginal people in the 1970s, Gilbert wrote a number of plays and sketches, including Ghosts in Cell Ten, The Blush of Birds, Eternally Eve, Evening of Fear, and Everyman Should Care. Many of these seem to have never been staged but stylistically seem to pre-empt much of the work of First Nations writers and practitioners of the 1990s, such as Wesley Enoch and Deborah Mailman.

In 1978, the National Book Council presented him its annual book award for his book Living Black: Blacks Talk to Kevin Gilbert. The book included interviews with various Black commentators of the day including musician and dancer Robert Jabanungga.

In 1988 he was awarded the Human Rights and Equal Opportunity Commission's Human Rights Award for Literature for editing the Aboriginal poetry anthology Inside Black Australia. He returned the medal to the Governor-general, Sir Ninian Stephens, citing the ongoing injustice and suffering of his people. Gilbert continued writing and exhibiting his artwork.

== Activism ==
Around 1971, Gilbert established the National Aboriginal Theatre Foundation, which did not last long. A journal called Alchuringa, listed as the "official journal of the National Aboriginal Theatre Foundation and the Aboriginal Tourist and Economic Development Association" and published in Sydney by Breda Publications, ran from December 1971 to February 1972 (not to be confused with a journal of the same name published in 1977 by the Aboriginal Land Rights Club at La Trobe University, Melbourne). It was noted as "Incorporating Churinga A.P.A.", referring to Churinga, which was published for the Aborigines Progressive Association from 1964 to 1970, edited by Herbert Groves, also by Breda. Alchuringa adopted a radical tone and urged Aboriginal people to engage in protest. Along with other Indigenous publications The Koorier, Black News Service, Black Nation, (Note: A Brisbane newspaper, founded and edited by Gungalu and Birri Gubba coordinator of the Black Protest Committee, Ross Watson. (See also 98.9 FM (Brisbane).)) North Queensland Palm Islander, and Koori Bina, the journal was later described as "staunchly political and oppositional to mainstream media messages and government policy".

From 1972 onwards Gilbert was active in numerous Aboriginal human rights causes and most notably in supporting the establishing the Aboriginal Tent Embassy at the Old Parliament House in Canberra.

Gilbert wrote a foreword in the third issue of the magazine Identity in 1972, and in 1975 an article on Indigenous land rights which was held by the publisher of the magazine, the Aboriginal Publications Foundation.

In October 1973 Gilbert was charged with having maliciously sent a letter threatening to kill another person, having written a letter to another man in which he allegedly threatened to kill the Queen. He was at that time editor and sole journalist on the Foundation for Aboriginal Affairs' newspaper, Black Australian News.

In 1979 he led the "National Aboriginal Government" protest on Capital Hill, Canberra, calling for acceptance of Australian Aboriginal Sovereignty.

He became chair of the "Treaty '88" campaign for a sovereign treaty between Aboriginal nations and peoples and non-Aboriginal Australians, as a proper foundation for all people living in Australia now. He defined the legal argument for a treaty or treaties and Aboriginal sovereignty in his 1987 work Aboriginal Sovereignty, Justice, the Law and Land.

For the last year of his life, in 1992, he was active in the re-establishment of the Aboriginal Tent Embassy after its 20th anniversary on a permanent basis, and it remains the spearhead of the Sovereignty Movement to this day. He is known for embracing the term "Black".

In the lead-up to Australia's bicentenary celebrations, Gilbert chaired the "Treaty '88" campaign for a treaty enshrining Aboriginal rights and sovereignty.

== Recognition and awards ==
- 1970: The Cherry Pickers nominated for a Captain Cook Memorial Award
- 1972: Commonwealth literary fellowship
- 1978: National Book Council prize for writers, for Living Black: Blacks Talk to Kevin Gilbert
- 1978: FAW Patricia Weickhardt Award to an Aboriginal Writer
- 1988: Awarded Human Rights and Equal Opportunity Commission's Human Rights Award for Literature for editing the Aboriginal poetry anthology Inside Black Australia, but refused the award
- 1992: Prime Minister's four-year Creative Fellowship for his "outstanding artistic contribution to the nation"

Posthumously

- 1995: Kate Challis RAKA Award for poetry, for Black from the Edge
- 1995: Highly commended in the ACT Book of the Year
- 1995: Me and Mary Kangaroo shortlisted for the Australian Multicultural Children's Literature Awards

Gilbert features in an episode in the 2013 documentary television series Desperate Measures, in which his daughter, poet Kerry Reed-Gilbert, presents aspects of his life. It is available on SBS on Demand.

== Death and legacy ==
Gilbert died of emphysema on 1 April 1993 aged 59. He was survived by six children, grandchildren and many great-grandchildren. One of his daughters is poet and activist Kerry Reed-Gilbert (1956–2019).

On 8 April 1993 a memorial service was held by Aboriginal people to honour Gilbert.

== Published works ==
Drama

- Bernard Hames Collection (1968). The Cherry Pickers: The first written Aboriginal play. Burrambinga Books (published 1988). ISBN 978-0-9588019-0-4.
- The Gods Look Down. Self (published 1970). 1969.
- Ghosts in Cell Ten. Self (published 1970). 1969.
- The Blush of Birds. Self (published 1970). 1969.
- Eternally Eve. Self (published 1970). 1969.
- Evening of Fear. Self. 1970.
- Everyman Should Care. Self. 1970.

Poetry

- End of Dream-Time. Island Press. 1971. OCLC 1011103763.
- People are legends: Aboriginal poems. Queensland University Press. 1978. ISBN 978-0-7022-1239-0.
- with Williams, Eleanor (photographer) (1994). Black from the edge. Hyland House. ISBN 978-1-875657-22-3.
- The Blackside: People are Legends and other poems. Hyland House. 1990. ISBN 978-0-947062-70-5.

Non-fiction

- Living Black. Allen Lane, The Penguin Press. 1977. ISBN 978-0-7139-1112-1.
- Because a white man'll never do it. Angus and Robertson. 1973. ISBN 978-0-207-12993-3.
- Aboriginal Sovereignty: justice, the Law and land. Treaty '88. 1988. ISBN 978-0-7316-3556-6.

Anthology

- Gilbert, Kevin, ed. (1988). Inside Black Australia: an anthology of Aboriginal poetry. Penguin. ISBN 978-0-14-011126-2.

For children

- with Williams, Eleanor (photographer) (1992). Child's Dreaming. Hyland House. ISBN 978-0-947062-97-2.
- with Williams, Eleanor (photographer) (November 1993). Me and Mary Kangaroo. Ringwood, Victoria: Viking Australia (published 1994). ISBN 978-0-670-85284-0.

== Collections ==
Gilbert's work is represented in many public and private collections, including:

- Museum of Contemporary Art, Sydney
- National Gallery of Australia
- National Museum of Australia
- Art Gallery of NSW
- Queensland Art Gallery
- Queensland Museum
- Western Australian Museum
- Powerhouse Museum
- Tandanya Aboriginal Art Gallery
- Museum of Victoria
- Queensland University of Technology
- Australian Institute of Aboriginal and Torres Strait Islander Studies

== Exhibitions ==
Exhibitions which have featured Gilbert's work include:

2016: Today, Tomorrow, Yesterday, Museum of Contemporary Art, (MCA) Sydney

2013: I Do have a belief: Kevin Gilbert (1933 - 1993), Belconnen Art Centre, ACT

2004: Athens Olympics, Greece

2001: Intermission, Wharf 2 Gallery, Sydney Theatre Company, Sydney Kevin Gilbert Retrospective, Boomalli Aboriginal Artists Co-op, Sydney

1996–2000: Breath of Life: Moments in transit towards Aboriginal Sovereignty; Visions of Australia National Tour; CHOGM, Durban, South Africa (2000); Rebecca Hossack Gallery, Soho, London (2000); Umbrella Gallery, Townsville (1999); Indigenous Pathways, Toowoomba (1998); Tandanya – National Aboriginal Cultural Institute, Adelaide (1997); The Armidale Aboriginal Cultural Centre and Keeping Place, Armidale (1997); Moree Plains Gallery, Moree (1997); Australian Centre for Photography, Paddington, Sydney (1997); Perth Institute of Contemporary Art, Perth (1997)' Canberra Contemporary Art Space (1996)

1995: Yiribana, Art Gallery of New South Wales, Sydney

1994: Tyerabarrbowaryaou II – I shall never become a white man, Museum of Contemporary Art Australia, Sydney and 5th Havana Biennial, Havana, Cuba

Urban Focus, National Gallery of Australia

Who’s afraid of Red, Black and Yella – Museum of Ethnology, Rotterdam

Legends from Down Under, Boomerang Galerie, Amsterdam

New Tracks – Old Land, Portland Art Museum, Portland, Oregon

1993 Memorial Tribute to Kevin Gilbert, Gallery One, National Gallery of Australia

New Tracks – Old Land Australian Galleries, Green Street, Soho, New York; Northern Territory Museum of Arts and Sciences, Darwin; Queensland Aboriginal Creations, Brisbane; Redcliff Entertainment Centre, Redcliff, Queensland

1992: New Tracks-Old Land, Massachusetts College of Art, Huntington Gallery, Boston Massachusetts

Painting Our Dreaming, Alliance Francaise Gallery, Canberra

’92 Pressin, Spiral Arm Gallery, Canberra

1991: Tjukurrpa Nganampa Kantyila Kanyintjaku – Keeping Our Dreaming Strong, Hackett, ACT & Alliance Francaise Gallery, Canberra.

Social Images, Gorman House, Canberra.

1990: Desert Art, Albert Hall, Canberra

1989: Narragunnawalli, Canberra Contemporary Art Space

Inside Black Australia, Aboriginal Photographers Exhibition, Showground, Wagga Wagga, NSW; Trades and Labour Club, Newcastle, NSW; Queensland Museum, Brisbane; Museum of Victoria, Melbourne.

1988: Inside Black Australia, Aboriginal Photographers Exhibition Albert Hall, Canberra; Leftbank Bookshop, Canberra; Tin Sheds Gallery, Sydney; Centreprize, London;. Boomalli Aboriginal Artists Co-Op, Sydney.

1975-6: Koorainghat Gardens Art Gallery, Taree, NSW

1970-1: Arts Council Gallery, East Sydney

1968, 1969 and 1970: Robin Hood Gallery, Sydney
