= Denis Walker (activist) =

Aboriginal Australian activist (1947–2017)

- Born: 2 December 1947
- Died: 4 December 2017 (aged 70)
- Other names: Bejam Kunmunara Jarlow Nunukel Kabool
- Mother: Oodgeroo Noonuccal

Denis P. Walker (2 December 1947 – 4 December 2017), also known as Bejam Kunmunara Jarlow Nunukel Kabool, was an Aboriginal Australian activist. He was a major figure in the civil rights and land rights movements of the 1970s and continued to fight for a treaty between the Australian Government and Aboriginal nations through the 1990s and until his death.

== Early life and family ==
Denis Walker was born in 1947. He was the son of Bruce Walker and poet Oodgeroo Noonuccal (Kath Walker) from Minjerribah (Stradbroke Island, Southern Queensland) , who wrote a poem about him called "Son of Mine". He was also known as "Bejam". He had two younger brothers; Robert Corowa, who later became involved with the Aboriginal Tent Embassy in 2019, and Vivian Walker (1953–1991), a dramatist.

== Activism ==
He co-founded, with Sam Watson, the Brisbane chapter of the Australian Black Panther Party (ABPP) on 8 January 1972. At the time, Walker declared the Black Panther Party (BPP) to be "the vanguard for all depressed people, and in Australia the Aboriginals are the most depressed of all".

Walker's stance on political violence was similar to the stance taken by other Black Panther parties and BPP-derived movements around the world. In a directive to members of the ABPP he said that "members must learn to use and service weapons correctly". In January 1972, having himself been in court only a few days beforehand on the charge of possessing a concealable firearm, he told reporters that "if you haven't got a gun, you have nothing. We're not going to get what we want by standing here and talking." The following March, in an address to the student union of Melbourne University, he contrasted the Australian BPP's position with that of the American BPP, saying that the Australian BPP's priority was not violent revolution, and that its focus was land rights rather than urban issues. As such, he asserted that the Australian BPP was prepared to use guns to back Aboriginal action over land rights, arguing that Aboriginal people should have the right to carry guns for self-defence.

Walker contributed to Identity magazine (1971–1982).

Walker was one of the "Brisbane Three": he faced charges of conspiracy against the state in Brisbane, along with Lionel Fogarty and Chilean national John Garcia. The charges, which had been laid by then premier of Queensland Joh Bjelke-Petersen's Special Branch in 1974, were on various offences relating to an alleged plot to "kidnap" Jim Varghese, students' union president at the University of Queensland. Cheryl Buchanan, who was director of the Black Resource Centre, which had moved from Melbourne to Brisbane, was involved in the defence and ultimate acquittal.

In October 1981, Walker was nominated for the elections to the National Aboriginal Conference, but was disqualified because at the time he was serving a two-year jail sentence for wounding a Department of Aboriginal Affairs official in Brisbane in 1979.

In 1992 Walker argued that white Australian law had no jurisdiction over Aboriginal Australians.

Walker continued to fight for a treaty between the Australian Government and Aboriginal nations through the 1990s and until his death.

== Later life and death ==
He was later known as Bejam Kunmunara Jarlow Nunukel Kabool.

He died on 4 December 2017.
