= John Kundereri Moriarty =

Australian soccer player and artist

- Born: c. 1938 (age 87–88); Borroloola, Northern Territory
- Education: Bachelor of Arts
- Alma mater: Flinders University
- Occupations: Designer, Businessman
- Employer: Jumbana Group
- Known for: Art, Sport
- Spouse: Ros Moriarty
- Relatives: Charlie Perkins (cousin)

John Moriarty (Football)
Personal information
- Full name: John Kundereri Moriarty
- Date of birth: c. 1938 (age 87–88)
- Place of birth: Borroloola, Northern Territory, Australia

Senior career*
Years	Team	Apps	(Gls)
- Port Thistle
- Adelaide Juventus
- Adelaide Croatia
- * Club domestic league appearances and goals as of 23 December 2008

John Kundereri "Jumbana" Moriarty AM (born c. 1938) is an Aboriginal Australian artist, government advisor and former soccer player. He is also known as founder of the Balarinji Design Studio, for painting two Qantas jets with Aboriginal motifs.

Today a full member of the Yanyuwa people of his birthplace, and belonging ceremonially to the rainbow serpent and kangaroo Dreamings, Moriarty has held senior and executive positions in the Department of Aboriginal Affairs at both federal and state government levels. He is a long-time advocate for Indigenous rights and Indigenous arts.

== Early life and education ==
Moriarty was born around 1938 (Note: Moriarty's date of birth was recorded officially as 1 April 1938 but this is not believed to be accurate, as the dates were randomly allocated to Aboriginal children by white officials. "When they couldn’t find your birth date, or didn’t try very hard, they gave you birthdates like mine 1st April. My cousin, Wilfred Huddlestone from Roper River, ended up getting a horse’s birthday and that was 1st August, and some were given 25th December which is Christmas Day, and dates like that. So it was a strange situation, but also gave people different names as well.") in Borroloola in the Northern Territory of Australia, to a tribal Aboriginal woman, Kathleen (Morr-my-bina), and an Irishman from County Kerry, John Moriarty. As such he was classified as "half-caste". He was removed from his mother at four years of age, making him part of the Stolen Generation, and did not see his mother for another 10 years.

Up until that age, he spoke only the Yanyuwa language. His Aboriginal name is Jumbana and his ceremonial name is Kundareri. He explained that Kundareri is a formal name, linking him to culture and sacred and other ceremonies, while Jumbana is more informal, like a given name, which is allocated by the older people in the community and sometimes called a "bush name".

After being removed from his school at Roper River (after the bombing of Darwin), he was taken via Alice Springs and Adelaide to a home for Aboriginal children at Mulgoa in the west of Sydney during World War II. (Note: This was the same place as Rona and Freda Glynn.)

A few years later, in January 1949, he was moved to St Francis House in Adelaide, where he met Gordon Briscoe, Charlie Perkins, Malcolm Cooper, Vincent Copley, Richie Bray, and others, who would later become Indigenous leaders and activists. It was also at St Francis where he started playing football. His talent was recognised, and as it became his passion, he was given a pair of football boots and a new goal in life.

In 1970 Moriarty graduated from Flinders University with a Bachelor of Arts, the first Aboriginal person to do so. He was later a recipient of a Churchill Fellowship.

== Activism ==
Moriarty was a foundation member of South Australia's Aborigines' Progress Association in 1964, becoming vice-president of the organisation, which fought for land rights and established the groundwork for an Aboriginal legal service (now referred to as an ATSILS, a specialised community legal centre).

He was a member of the committee which ran the Aboriginal Publications Foundation, which published the magazine for Indigenous people, Identity, in the 1970s.

== Soccer ==
Moriarty played association football (soccer) for South Australian First Division teams Port Thistle and Adelaide Juventus before playing for Adelaide Croatia, alongside St Francis House schoolmates Perkins (also his cousin) and Briscoe.

In 1960 he was selected to play his first game for the state, which meant travelling to Western Australia. In order for him to be allowed to travel out of the state, the South Australian Soccer Federation had to get permission from the Protector of Aborigines (Clarence Edmund Bartlett, who also wrote a book about Point McLeay mission). Also in 1960, Moriarty was the first recognised Indigenous Australian to be selected for a national soccer team. He was selected to play in an Australian national team tour to Hong Kong, but the tour was cancelled after Australia's expulsion from FIFA.

Moriarty's career ended after a collision with a goalkeeper, after he had represented the state of South Australia 17 times. After retiring, Moriarty served on the board of Adelaide Juventus (later Adelaide City).

=== John Moriarty Football ===
Moriarty, along with co-founder Ros Moriarty, established John Moriarty Football (JMF), focused on grassroots participation, which awards scholarships for young Indigenous soccer players. JMF has received international praise from FIFA, and has received money from outside sources such as Tim Cahill. As of 2020, Craig Foster is a board member of the JMF.

One of the early recipients of a scholarship was Shay Evans, who played her debut game for the Young Matildas in 2018, and as of 2020 plays in the W-League.

From November 2020, as part of Indigenous Football Week, JMF started offering new Community Scholarships Pathways Program, which in addition to football training, offers educational support.

JMF has collaborated with the Football Australia (FA) to offer community coaching and leadership training programs, and there is a strong Indigenous focus and emphasis on gender-equal quotas.

JMF is one of several initiatives of the Moriarty Foundation.

=== Indigenous Football Week ===
Indigenous Football Week was established in 2015. It is an initiative of JMF, in partnership with FA, the Professional Footballers Australia (PFA), SBS TV, NITV, and FOX Sports. Its fifth edition was celebrated in JMF communities in the Northern Territory, New South Wales, and Queensland.

Australian rules footballer Adam Goodes was patron of Indigenous Football Week in 2020.

== Art ==
In 1983 Moriarty founded the Jumbana Group in Adelaide, with the Balarinji brand being the most prominent component.

In 1994 Moriarty was commissioned by the Australian national airline, Qantas, to design artwork for a Boeing 747-400 aeroplane. The finished result was the "Wunala Dreaming", which was first displayed on (VH-OJB), then on (VH-OEJ). This was "the largest piece of movable Aboriginal art". A second aeroplane, a Boeing 747-300, was painted in 1995 and is known as "Nalanji Dreaming" (VH-EBU).

He was also responsible for repainting two NR class locomotive to Indigenous livery.

His wife Ros Moriarty is managing director of the Jumbana Group and creative director of Balarinji Studio.

== Other roles ==
Prior to founding Balarinji, Moriarty was a public servant in various departments of Aboriginal Affairs, both state and federal. When living in Canberra in the late 1970s, he met Aboriginal activist Charlie Perkins, and, along with Vince Copley and others, was referred to as one of (Charlie's) "angels" by Jackie Huggins and others.

Between 1994 and 2004 Moriarty served on the board of Indigenous Business Australia.

He has also served on other boards and councils, including Sydney Harbour Federation Trust, the National Indigenous Council, the National Aboriginal and Islander Health Council, the Australian International Cultural Committee, the NSW Government Aboriginal Business Round Table, the Sustainable Minerals Institute at the University of Queensland, the Northern Territory Tourist Commission, and the South Australian Museum. He has chaired the Aboriginal and Torres Strait Islander Arts Board of the Australia Council, the ATSIC Electoral Boundaries Review Committee, and the National Aboriginal Sports Corporation of Australia.

In 2000, he wrote an autobiography, Saltwater Fella, published by Viking Press.

== Awards and honours ==
- 1971 – recipient of a Churchill Fellowship
- 1992 – South Australian Aboriginal Businessman of the Year
- 1995 – Advance Australia Award for service to industry and commerce
- 1997 – Honorary doctorate from University of South Australia
- 2000 – Member of the Order of Australia
- 2001 – Flinders University Convocation Medal
- 2014 – Inducted into the Australian Design Hall of Fame
- 2015 – Inducted into the Football Australia Hall of Fame
- 2016 – Honorary doctorate of Flinders University
- 2018 – Diversity Award from FIFA

== Personal life ==
John and Ros Moriarty were married in 1982. Ros was born in Tasmania, and graduated from Australian National University. She worked as a journalist for Radio Australia, and later worked in senior roles in the Department of Aboriginal Affairs in Canberra and Sydney. She also received the Advance Australia Award for service to industry and commerce, and in 2010, published her memoir, Listening to Country.

They have three children.
