= Gordon Briscoe =

Australian indigenous activist (1938–2023)

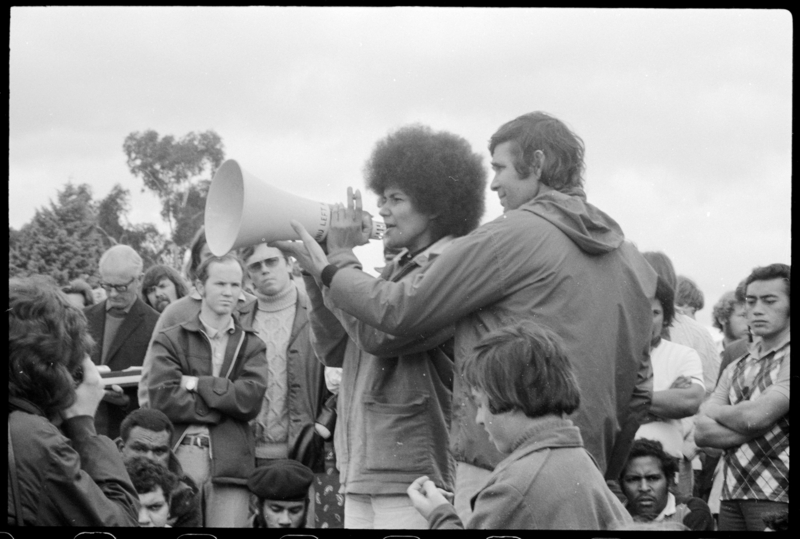
- Briscoe with Bobbi Sykes in 1972
- Born: 1938; Alice Springs, Northern Territory
- Died: 30 June 2023 (aged 84)
- Education: BA (Hist), MA, PhD – Australian National University
- Occupation: Research Fellow
- Employer: Australian National University

Gordon Briscoe AO (1938 – 30 June 2023) was an Aboriginal Australian academic and activist. In 1997, he was awarded a PhD from the Australian National University. He was also a soccer player.

== Early life ==
Born in Alice Springs, Northern Territory, Australia, Gordon Briscoe was descended from the Marduntjara and Pitjantjatjara nations of Central Australia. He was removed from his mother, Eileen, as a child and was educated at St Francis House in Semaphore South, a beachside suburb of Adelaide near Port Adelaide, South Australia. There he was treated with kindness, sent to the local school, and met other future Aboriginal leaders and activists, including Charles Perkins, John Kundereri Moriarty, Richie Bray, Vince Copley, Malcolm Cooper, and others.

== Activism ==
Briscoe was involved in the establishment in New South Wales of the Aboriginal Progress Association in the 1950s, the Aboriginal Legal Service in the 1960s and the Aboriginal Medical Service in 1972.

He was treasurer on the committee of the Aboriginal Publications Foundation, which published the magazine Identity, in the 1970s.

== Soccer ==
After playing state league for Adelaide Croatia alongside Charles Perkins and John Moriarty, Briscoe moved to England in 1958 with the hope of playing professional football. He had stints at Barnet and Preston North End (although he did not make a first team appearance), before returning to Australia at the suggestion of his former schoolmate and teammate Perkins.

Briscoe, along with Perkins and Moriarty, later played recreational soccer with the Australian National University Soccer Club from 1968 to about 1972.

== Academia ==
In 1981, Briscoe began his academic career with the Australian National University (ANU). His focus was on Indigenous history and he was involved in the production of the SBS documentary First Australians. In 1997, he was awarded a PhD from ANU. (Note: Although this article says he was the first Indigenous Australian to earn a PhD, other sources show that this is not so. There's Eve Fesl in 1988, and this study says "the earliest record that we could find was the PhD awarded to Dr Bill Jonas in 1980 by the University of Papua New Guinea" and "we estimate that approximately 25 Indigenous people were awarded their doctorate [during the 1980s]" (some at least from overseas universities).)

Briscoe became inaugural Research Fellow of ANU's Australian Centre for Indigenous History in 2003.

== Publications ==
Briscoe's memoir, Racial Folly: A Twentieth-Century Aboriginal Family was published by ANU Press in 2010 as an open access book. It "shows us the history of an Aboriginal family who lived under the race laws, practices and policies of Australia in the twentieth century. It tells the story of a people trapped in ideological folly spawned to solve 'the half-caste problem'"

He also wrote a number of books and reports on Aboriginal health and history, including:

- Counting, Health and Identity: A History of Aboriginal Health and Demography in Western Australia and Queensland, 1900–1940 published by Aboriginal Studies Press in 2003,
- Queensland Aborigines and the Spanish Influenza Pandemic of 1918–1919 published in 1996, which 'Discusses impact of the Spanish Influenza pandemic on Queensland Aborigines who accounted for 30 per cent of the death toll in Queensland'.

== Death ==
Briscoe died on 30 June 2023 at the age of 84.
