= Department of Aboriginal Affairs =

Australian government department, 1972–1990

Department overview
- Formed: 19 December 1972
- Preceding Department: Department of the Environment, Aborigines and the Arts
- Dissolved: 5 March 1990
- Superseding Department: Aboriginal and Torres Strait Islander Commission
- Jurisdiction: Commonwealth of Australia
- Headquarters: Canberra
- Ministers responsible: Gordon Bryant, Minister (1972–1973); Jim Cavanagh, Minister (1973–1975); Les Johnson, Minister (1975); Tom Drake-Brockman, Minister (1975); Ian Viner, Minister (1975–1978); Fred Chaney, Minister (1978–1980); Peter Baume, Minister (1980–1982) Ian Wilson, Minister (1982–1983) Clyde Holding, Minister (1983–1987) Gerry Hand, Minister (1987–1990)
- Department executives: Lenox Hewitt, Secretary (1972–1973); Barrie Dexter, Secretary (1973–1977); David Hay, Secretary (1977–1979); Tony Ayers, Secretary (1979–1981); John Taylor, Secretary (1981–1984); Charles Perkins, Secretary (1984–1988); Bill Gray, Secretary (1988–1990)

The Department of Aboriginal Affairs was an Australian government department that existed between December 1972 and March 1990.

== History ==
The department had its origins in the Office of Aboriginal Affairs (OAA), which was established by the Holt government in 1967 following a constitutional amendment that granted the federal government new powers. In 1972, the OAA was transformed into a separate government department, replacing the preceding Department of the Environment, Aborigines and the Arts created by the McMahon government.

The Department of Aboriginal Affairs was one of several new departments established by the Whitlam government, a wide restructuring in line with the new government's programme. After the Whitlam government was dismissed in 1975, the department had its budget cut by 43 percent in the Fraser government's first budget, in 1976.

In 1980, the Fraser government established the Aboriginal Development Commission. Media speculated at the time that the government was considering abolishing the department, but it was not abolished until 1990, by the Hawke government, when it was amalgamated with the Aboriginal Development Commission to create the Aboriginal and Torres Strait Islander Commission. A "wake" was held on 2 March 1990 by staff, to mark the department's demise.

== Scope ==
Information about the department's functions and government funding allocation could be found in the Administrative Arrangements Orders, the annual Portfolio Budget Statements and in the department's annual reports.

According to the Administrative Arrangements Order issued 19 December 1972, at its creation, the department was responsible for:

- Matters related to the Aboriginal people of Australia
- The development and administration of national policies for the advancement and welfare of the Aboriginal people, including the administration of welfare activities in the Territories
- Special laws for the Aboriginal people

== Structure ==
The department was an Australian Public Service department, staffed by officials who were responsible to the Minister for Aboriginal Affairs.
