= Charles Perkins (Aboriginal activist) =

Australian Aboriginal activist and football player, coach and administrator

Charles Perkins AO
- Perkins on graduation day at the University of Sydney in 1966
- Born: 16 June 1936; Alice Springs, Northern Territory, Australia
- Died: 19 October 2000 (aged 64); Sydney, New South Wales, Australia
- Other names: Charlie Perkins, Kumantjayi Perkins
- Education: Bachelor of Arts
- Alma mater: University of Sydney
- Known for: Activism, public service, soccer
- Spouse: Eileen Munchenberg
- Children: Hetti, Rachel and Adam
- Parents: Martin Connelly (father); Hetty Perkins (mother)
- Relatives: Madeleine Madden (granddaughter)
Association football career
Senior career*
Years	Team	Apps	(Gls)
1950	Port Thistle	?	
1954–1955	International United	?	
1956–1957	Fiorentina	?	
1957	Budapest	?	
1957	Everton	0	(0)
1957–1959	Bishop Auckland	?	
1959–1960	Adelaide Croatia	?	
1961–1963	Pan-Hellenic	?	
1963–1966	Bankstown	?	
1969	ANU	?	
Managerial career
- 1959–1960: Adelaide Croatia
- 1961–1964: Pan-Hellenic
- 1969: ANU
- * Club domestic league appearances and goals as of 15 December 2008

Charles Nelson Perkins (16 June 1936 – 19 October 2000), popularly known as Charlie Perkins, was an Aboriginal Australian activist, soccer player, and public administrator. He is often recognised as the first known Indigenous Australian man to graduate from a tertiary institution. Perkins was a prominent figure in the 1965 Freedom Ride, which highlighted racial discrimination in rural Australia, and played a significant role in campaigning for a "yes" vote in the 1967 referendum on Aboriginal rights. He later held various positions within the Australian public service.

== Early life and family ==
Perkins was born on 16 June 1936 in the old Alice Springs Telegraph Station to Hetty Perkins, originally from nearby Arltunga, and Martin Connelly, originally from Mount Isa, Queensland. His mother was born to a white father and an Arrernte mother, while his father had an Irish father and a Kalkadoon mother. Perkins had one full sibling and nine other half-siblings by his mother and was also a cousin of artist and soccer player John Moriarty. He was the great-uncle of Pat Turner, and inspired her work to improve the lives of and right to self-determination for Indigenous people.

Between 1952 and 1957, Perkins worked as an apprentice fitter and turner for the British Tube Mills company in Adelaide.

He married Eileen Munchenberg, a descendant of a German Lutheran family, on 23 September 1961 and had two daughters (Hetti and Rachel), and a son (Adam). His granddaughter through Hetti is actress Madeleine Madden.

== Education ==
Perkins obtained his early schooling at St Mary's Church School in Alice Springs, before moving down to St Francis House for Aboriginal Boys in Semaphore South, a beachside suburb of Adelaide near Port Adelaide, South Australia. There he was treated with kindness, sent to the local school, and met other future Aboriginal leaders and activists, including Gordon Briscoe, John Kundereri Moriarty, Richie Bray, Vince Copley, Malcolm Cooper, and others.

He subsequently attended the Metropolitan Business College in Sydney, followed by the University of Sydney, from where he graduated in 1966 with a Bachelor of Arts. He was the first Indigenous man in Australia to graduate from university. While at university he worked part-time for the City of South Sydney cleaning toilets.

== Public life ==
=== The Freedom Ride ===
In 1965, he was one of the key members of the Freedom Ride – a bus tour through New South Wales by activists protesting discrimination against Aboriginal people in small towns in NSW, Australia. This action was inspired by the US Civil Rights Movement Freedom Ride campaign in 1961. The Australian Freedom Ride aimed to expose discrepancies in living, education and health conditions among the Aboriginal population. The tour targeted rural towns such as Walgett, Moree, and Kempsey. They acted to publicise acts of blatant discrimination. This was demonstrated through one of the Freedom Ride activities in Walgett. A local RSL club refused entry to Aboriginal people, including those who were ex-servicemen who participated in the two World Wars. At one stage during the Rides, the protesters' bus was run off the road.

On 20 February 1965, Perkins and his party tried to enter the swimming pool at Moree, where the local council had barred Aboriginal people from swimming since its opening 40 years earlier. They stood at the gate refusing to let anyone else in if they were not let in. In response to this action, the riders faced physical opposition from several hundred local white Australians, including community leaders, and were pelted with eggs and tomatoes. These events were broadcast across Australia, and under pressure from public opinion, the council eventually reversed the ban on Aboriginal swimmers. The Freedom Ride then moved on, but on the way out they were followed by a line of cars, one of which collided with the rear of their bus, forcing them to return to Moree where they found that the council had reneged on their previous decision. The Freedom Riders protested once again, forcing the council to remove the ban once more.

On 6 August 1965, Perkins staged a fake "kidnapping" of 5-year-old Nancy Prasad from under the nose of immigration officials at the Sydney airport for the purpose of highlighting the injustice of her deportation under Australia's "White Australia" immigration policy. His antic had effect. The newspapers headlined the "kidnapping". Even so, Prasad was taken to the airport again and deported to Fiji on 7 August 1965.

=== 1967 referendum ===
In 1967, a referendum was held on constitutional amendments to allow the inclusion of Aboriginal people in censuses and giving the Parliament of Australia the right to introduce legislation specifically for Aboriginal people. In the lead-up to the referendum, Perkins was manager of the Foundation for Aboriginal Affairs, an organisation that took a key role in advocating a Yes vote. The constitutional amendment passed with a 90.77% majority.

=== Canberra ===
In 1969, Perkins began his career in Commonwealth government public service in the Office of Aboriginal Affairs in Canberra, which became the Department of Aboriginal Affairs (DAA) in 1972. In that year, he underwent a kidney transplant.

Soon after getting his first job in Canberra, he founded the company Aboriginal Hostels Limited, with the aim of setting up a national network of hostels providing temporary accommodation for Aboriginal people. In 1973, he became the inaugural chair of its board. Joe McGinness and Vince Copley later held management positions in the company, covering different regions.

In 1974, he was suspended on full pay by Barrie Dexter for improper conduct after he called the Liberal–Country Coalition government in Western Australia "biggest racist political parties in this country has ever seen", which came after an earlier altercation with his minister, Labor Senator Jim Cavanagh. During his suspension, he was hailed a hero for disarming a gun-toting man who was threatening two senior officers in the department. However, his decision to take a week's leave to sit with the Aboriginal Tent Embassy was the final straw, and he was given leave for a year in 1975.

During his year off, funded by a Literature Board grant, he wrote his autobiography, A Bastard Like Me, and was appointed general secretary of the National Aborigines Consultative Committee, returning to the DAA in 1976. In 1978, he was appointed as a first assistant secretary of the department, and then in 1979 deputy Secretary before resigning in 1980 in order to take up chairmanship of the new Aboriginal Development Commission.

When a Labor government under Bob Hawke was elected in 1983, with Clyde Holding appointed as minister, Perkins was appointed Secretary of the DAA in 1984, holding the position until 1988. Perkins was the first Indigenous person appointed to head an Australian Government department.

Throughout his career, he was a strident critic of Australian Government policies on Indigenous affairs and was renowned for his fiery comments. Hawke once said of Perkins that he "sometimes found it difficult to observe the constraints usually imposed on permanent heads of departments because he had a burning passion for advancing the interests of his people".

He served as chair of the Arrernte Council of Central Australia from 1991 until 2000.

In 1993, Perkins joined the Aboriginal and Torres Strait Islander Commission (ATSIC), and was elected deputy chair in 1994, serving until he resigned in 1995 to become a consultant to the Australian Sports Commission.

=== Public commentary ===
On 7 April 2000, Perkins suggested that 'Sydney will burn during the Sydney 2000 Olympics.' The comment sparked outrage from many different quarters. In May 2000, Perkins declared that the Australian Football League and the Australian Rugby League were racist, suggesting that the AFL "acts in a racist manner at the highest level".

== Other roles ==
Perkins was secretary of the committee of the Aboriginal Publications Foundation, which published the magazine Identity, in the 1970s.

== Soccer career ==
Perkins began playing in 1950 with Adelaide team Port Thistle. In 1951, he was selected for a South Australia under 18 representative team. He went on to play for a number of teams in Adelaide including International United (1954–55), Budapest (1956–57) and Fiorentina (1957).

In 1957, he was invited to trial with English first division team Liverpool F.C. Perkins ended up trialling and training with Liverpool's city rival Everton F.C. While at Everton Perkins had a physical confrontation with the Everton reserve grade manager after being called a "kangaroo bastard". After this incident, Perkins left Everton to move to Wigan, where he worked as a coal miner at the Mosley Common Colliery alongside Great Britain rugby league player Terry O'Grady. Perkins played two seasons for leading English amateur team Bishop Auckland F.C. between 1957 and 1959. Perkins in mid-1959 decided to return to Australia after trialling with Manchester United.

On returning to Australia, Perkins was appointed captain and coach of Adelaide Croatia. At Croatia, he played alongside notable Aboriginal figures Gordon Briscoe and John Moriarty.

In 1961, when Perkins moved to Sydney to study at university, he played with Pan-Hellenic (later known as Sydney Olympic FC) in the New South Wales State League where he became captain and coach. He later played for Bankstown and retired in 1965.

Following his move to Canberra in 1969, Perkins joined the ANU Soccer Club (later known as the ANU Football Club) as player and coach.

He later served as president of former National Soccer League team Canberra City. In 1987, He was appointed vice-president of the Australian Soccer Federation (a forerunner of the Football Federation Australia) and was the chairman of the Australian Indoor Soccer Federation (later known as the Australian Futsal Federation) for ten years until his death in 2000.

== Recognition ==
Perkins was awarded Jaycees Young Man of the Year in 1966, and NAIDOC Aboriginal of the Year in 1993.

He was made an Officer of the Order of Australia in the Australia Day Honours in 1987, for services to Aboriginal welfare.

He was inducted into the Football Federation Australia Football Hall of Fame for services as a player, coach and administrator in 2000.

In 1998, he was awarded an honorary doctorate of letters by the University of Western Sydney, and shortly before his death, he was awarded an honorary Doctor of Law by the University of Sydney.

Perkins was named by the National Trust of Australia as one of Australia's Living National Treasures.

John Farquharson wrote in his obituary that Perkins "was perhaps not only the most influential Aborigine of modern times, but also must be numbered among the outstanding Australians of the century".

== Death ==
Perkins died in Sydney on 19 October 2000 of renal failure. During the 1970s, Perkins had a kidney transplant and at the time of his death, was the longest post-transplant survivor in Australia. In the period immediately following his death, he was known as Kumantjayi Perkins, Kumantjayi being a name used to refer to a deceased person in Arrernte culture. He was given a state funeral and his body was returned to Alice Springs a week after his death.

== Legacy ==
- In 2001, the Dr Charles Perkins AO Memorial Oration and Dr Charles Perkins AO Memorial Prize were established in his honour by the University of Sydney.
- In 2009, The Charlie Perkins Trust instituted two scholarships per year to allow Indigenous Australians to study for up to three years at the University of Oxford.
- The Charles Perkins Centre at the University of Sydney, designed in 2012 and opened in June 2014, was named in honour of Perkins.
- In 2013, Australia Post issued a series of postage stamps featuring five eminent Indigenous rights campaigners, including Perkins, Shirley Smith, Neville Bonner, Oodgeroo Noonuccal and Eddie Mabo.
- In 2025, Football Australia announced the renaming of the First Nations youth football program's invitational teams to the Charles Perkins XI.

=== In the arts ===
There are several books about Perkins, and artist Bill Leak painted a portrait of him.

In 2018, Paul Kelly wrote a song about Perkins, called "A Bastard Like Me", with the title of the song taken from Perkins' autobiography and the music video featuring footage from his life. It appears on the album Nature.

=== In film ===
- Freedom Ride (1993) is an episode of four-part documentary called Blood Brothers by Rachel Perkins and Ned R. Lander.
- Fire Talker (2009) by Ivan Sen uses archival footage from the early 1960s to 2001 to build an intimate portrait of Perkins' life.
- Remembering Charlie Perkins (2009), in which Gordon Briscoe recalls his friend Perkins' fight for equality and liberty, in the Dr Charles Perkins Memorial Oration.

== See also ==
- List of Indigenous Australian firsts

Government offices
Preceded by John Taylor	Secretary of the Department of Aboriginal Affairs; 1984–1988	Succeeded by Bill Gray
