= Josie Agius =

Aboriginal Australian health worker and educator

- Born: Josephine Marjorie Warrior; 2 April 1934; Wallaroo, South Australia
- Died: 30 December 2015 (aged 81)
- Other name: Aunty Josie
- Children: 6
- Relatives: Winnie Branson (sister); Vince Copley (brother); Gladys Elphick (aunt)

Josephine Marjorie Agius (née Warrior; 2 April 1934 – 30 December 2015), known as Aunty Josie, was an Aboriginal Australian health and culture educator and elder in South Australia. A Narungga, Kaurna, Ngarrindjeri, and Ngadjuri woman, Agius became well known for her Welcomes to Country at events and organisations.

== Early life and education ==
Josephine Marjorie(or Marjory) Warrior was born on 2 April 1934 (Note: Note: This is the date given by Josie Agius herself in 2000. A later publication (after her death) cites her birthdate as 8 February 1934.) in Wallaroo, on the Yorke Peninsula in South Australia. She was the daughter of Katie Edwards and Fred Warrior, and sister to Winnie Branson (the eldest), Colin (who died as a teenager after stepping on a nail and not getting adequate treatment), Maureen, and Vince Copley, the youngest. Warrior was an anglicised form of Fred's father's name, Barney Waria (1873–1948). Barney Waria was one of a few last initiated Ngadjuri men, and his stories were documented by anthropologist Ronald Berndt and his wife Catherine Berndt. Katie Edwards' parents were Joe and Maisie May (née Adams), and Maisie was a great-granddaughter of Kudnarto. A Kaurna/Ngadjuri woman, she was the first Aboriginal woman to legally marry a colonist in South Australia. "Pappa" (Joe) was a Narungga man, a grandson of "King Tommy", an important man who negotiated with settlers on the Yorke Peninsula.

Agius grew up in the Narungga culture after her father died when she was three, but also listened to the stories of "Grandfather Barney", who was Ngadjuri. She was proud of her mixed heritage, which also included Ngarrindjeri. Gladys Elphick was an aunt.

Katie would take young Josie on a donkey from Wallaroo to Kadina, where she did housework, leaving Josie in a playgrounds until she had finished work. Later Winnie looked after the younger children. When Josie was around seven or eight, the children went to live with their grandparents for around five years at Point Pearce (an Aboriginal reserve) while Katie and Winnie went to find work in Adelaide.

Agius and her siblings, apart from Winnie, went to school at Point Pearce before moving with their mother to Adelaide when she was around 10 or 11. They lived on Henley Beach Road in Mile End, and went to Thebarton School until around Year 6. Katie remarried, to a white man, Allan Copley, and the family moved up to Leigh Creek, where Copley had a job. They went to school at Leigh Creek, before moving to Alice Springs in the Northern Territory, and Agius left school aged 14. Sometime after their mother died (when Josie was 16), Vince moved to St Francis House, a home for Aboriginal boys in Semaphore, while Agius got work in Adelaide. They also spent some time staying with Winnie at Pine Point.

Early jobs in Adelaide included at the Franklin Hotel, and a live-in job as a waitress for two years at Methodist Ladies' College (later Annesley), before getting married and moving to Mount Gambier.

== Career ==
In her youth in Adelaide, Agius (as well as father Fred and siblings Vince and Winnie) were involved with the Aborigines Progress Association which was being run by John Moriarty, and the Aboriginal Women's Council, which was run by their aunt, Gladys Elphick. Don Dunstan (later Premier of South Australia) used to meet with the groups at Port Adelaide, and Agius and siblings would attend the annual FCAATSI (Federal Council for the Advancement of Aboriginal and Torres Strait Islanders) meetings. Agius later said that politics did not really interest her, and that their aunt Mary Williams and sister Winnie were more active in the groups.

In the 1970s she started working in Aboriginal health. She worked for seven years at the Aboriginal Health Unit, travelling from Taperoo down to Norwood to pick up a car each day for use in the Port Adelaide, where most of the Aboriginal people who had moved down from the reserves and missions lived. Agius was responsible for the Port Adelaide area of the unit that developed a cultural framework for service delivery by hospitals and other health services to Aboriginal people.

After her husband died, by which time she had two grandchildren, Agius worked at Taperoo Primary School for seven years, from 1984 until 1991. After a short break, she worked with linguist Rob Amery, who was involved in the revival of the Kaurna language, and started teaching language and culture at different schools. The children called her "Auntie Josie", and she became well known by this moniker. She helped school staff to liaise with Aboriginal students and their families, introduced Aboriginal Culture Week, ensured that students were involved in NAIDOC Week activities, and assisted in establishing the Kurruru Indigenous Youth Art Centre in Port Adelaide.

She attended Tauondi Aboriginal College for three years as an adult, where she did a "Tourism and Language" course, along with reading, writing, and maths. In 2000 she was working with children at the Youth Theatre in Port Adelaide, running dance and circus classes. She set up an Indigenous theatre group.

Agius was keen netballer, also worked as a sports administrator in netball and football, and was frequently called on to do Welcomes to Country at organisations and events such as the Adelaide Fringe. In 2013, she was greeted by Australian captain Michael Clarke as she gave her Welcome at the Adelaide Oval on the first day of the 2013 Ashes Test.

Agius was recognised for her work as a teacher, and for her work on reconciliation. In 2000 she said:

...when you've worked in different places and with different, the other ethnic groups that you've mixed with all your life, you’ve been reconciling. So the reconciliation thing is, what he says, it's not going to be anything new. It might be new for some people, because they're working towards it and maybe they've even done that themselves, so maybe it's something that they have to learn, to do that themselves, from inside them, make it happen for them.

On 10 March 2011, she spoke at an International Women's Day event on the steps of Parliament House, Adelaide.

== Personal life ==
Josie married Freddie Agius. They lived in Mount Gambier, where they had two sons, before moving to Port McDonnell for six years. After that they moved to the Adelaide suburb of Taperoo, where they had a daughter, two more sons, and then another daughter.

She was a fan of Port Adelaide Football Club, and spent time with Indigenous footballers. She became the ambassador for the Port Adelaide Power Cup.

== Recognition and honours ==
In 1990, Agius was named Aboriginal Person of the Year by Port Adelaide Council.

In 1998, she was appointed South Australian Ambassador for Adult Learning.

In the New Year's Honours in 2001, she was awarded the Centenary Medal for services to the community, particularly youth.

In 2009 Agius was inducted into the SA Women's Honour Roll.

In 2014, she was awarded the David Unaipon Award.

She was patron of the NAIDOC SA Awards in 2014 and 2015, and herself received the Premier's NAIDOC Award in 2014 "for improving the lives and welfare of Aboriginal peoples in South Australia".

On 1 May 2016, Agius' name was added to the Port Adelaide Workers' Memorial. in honour of her being a "good unionist", and working for better working conditions for ordinary people.

In 2017, the City of Adelaide named Park 22, one of the Adelaide Park Lands parks, Josie Agius Park/Wikaparntu Wirra in her honour, as she was a strong supporter of girls' netball. Wikaparntu Wirra is a newly constructed Kaurna word meaning "netball park".

On 15 February 2021, the City of Port Adelaide Enfield officially renamed Taperoo Reserve, home of the Port Adelaide Soccer Club, to Ngarrpadla (Nar-pud-lah; meaning "Auntie" in Kaurna) Josie Agius Reserve.

== Death and legacy ==
Agius, by then regarded as senior elder, died on 30 December 2015.

She was honoured by many members in the South Australian Legislative Council after a motion brought by Tammy Franks, and in federal parliament Tony Zappia paid tribute to her.

A funeral service held for her at Alberton Oval on 14 January 2016 drew hundreds of mourners, including the state premier, Jay Weatherill Hieu Van Le, the Governor of South Australia, and Kyam Maher, SA Aboriginal Affairs Minister. She was remembered for her commitment and work as an educator, for being one of the earliest Aboriginal health workers in the state, as a sought-after cultural consultant, as well as for her sense of humour. Her remains were interred at Cheltenham Cemetery.

The Aunty Josie Agius Award is an award given to an Aboriginal employee or team working in any role in the South Australian Department for Education.

The Aunty Josie Agius Youth Achievement Award is given by the City of Port Adelaide Enfield as part of the annual Aboriginal and Torres Strait Islander Awards.

There is a meeting room named after her at the Department for Infrastructure and Transport.
