= Myra Ah Chee =

Australian artist and author (born 1932)

Myra Ah Chee (born 13 April 1932), also known as Kanakiya Myra Ah Chee, is an Aboriginal Australian artist, interpreter and translator, storyteller, and author. In 2021 she published her autobiography, Nomad Girl: my life on the Gibber Plains and beyond.

== Biography ==
Myra Ah Chee is a Southern Aranda (Pertame) and Luritja woman, born at Oodnadatta, South Australia, on 13 April 1932. She is the daughter of Molly Niningaya and Dick Taylor Junior (an Aboriginal man who worked with Afghan cameleers in Australia) and she was born at the Australian Inland Mission Hospital at Oodnadatta. She was named after Sister Myra, the nursing sister there, who delivered her. She is the granddaughter of Charlie Apma and the niece of Undelya (Minnie) Apma.

She spent her early years living in a watuti (lean-to) on the fringes of the township with her family with her siblings. Starting at the age of seven, Ah Chee began attending the United Aborigines Mission (UAM) Church School in Oodnadatta and to 'ensure' that the children would be nice clean and tidy when they attended lessons she lived there from around 1939 to 1940; her parents were living only a short distance away.

Ah Chee's time at the UAM school ended abruptly in 1940 when she ran away from the home when the male missionary there was to bathe her and she ran away; she said of this:

Normally I would enjoy a both, but what we didn't like about it this time was that it was the man giving the little girls a bath, and the lady giving the boys a bath. We were just little girls, and we were shy about that sort of thing. We didn't like the man bathing us. It does seem a bit inexplicable, a bit strange, even today.

— Kanakiya Myra Ah Chee, Nomad girl (2021), p. 34

When she returned home and the missionary came to bring her back she refused to return.

In October 1940 Ah Chee's mother died, after unsuccessful treatment in Port Augusta in which her arm was amputated, and her cause of death was likely cancer. After her death the family decided to leave Oodnadatta and return to her father Dick Taylor's traditional country in the Northern Territory. They travelled there on her father's camels and took what Ah Chee calls a "meandering journey" in order to see the country of the Northern Territory and meet their extended family; one place that they stopped at for some time was Horseshoe Bend Station where she compared their journey to that of Carl Strehlow as told by the book Journey to Horseshoe Bend (1978).

Ah Chee's father began taking on work at cattle stations along their journey, including Tempe Downs Station, where he dug wells and built cattle yards, and the family spent many years living out in the open and sleeping under the stars. During World War II Ah Chee and her family lived in Alice Springs, where they camped with their camels just south of Heavitree Gap. Ah Chee spent some of her time in Alice Springs staying with her Aunty Maude in town and attending Hartley Street School but this was short-lived as she missed her family too much and did not like staying away from them.

In 1945 Ah Chee was sent by her father to the Colebrook Home, near Quorn in South Australia. She attended school alongside her cousin Lowitja O'Donoghue who was a good friend to her; Ah Chee remembers her being a good friend, very kind and that she was always encouraging Ah Chee to do additional studies and her homework; acting like a tutor to her.

Ah Chee left school in 1949, at the age of 16, and began working as a domestic hand at Maryvale Station (where her father was already employed) for a short time before starting work for Charles Duguid and his family in Adelaide primarily as domestic help with some secretarial assistance also provided. She remembers him very positively and believed him to be a hard-working fighter for Aboriginal people; she said:

We used to have a good yarn together. I used to call him Tjilpi - old man. I'd ask him sometimes, 'Tjilpi!' 'Yes?' 'Why haven't you being knighted? Why aren't you Sir Charles Duguid?' 'How can I Myra?' he'd reply, and go on to say, 'I am always fighting the government!'

— Kanakiya Myra Ah Chee, Nomad Girl (2021), p. 107

When she had days off she would meet up with other girls from the Colebrook Home and was in contact with many family and friends while in Adelaide. It was here that she met with Fred Ah Chee who she would later marry. Fred, who was originally also from Oodnadatta, was a friend of her brothers who was studying at the School of Mines as well as working as an electrician, he was boarding with her Aunt Undelya (Minnie) Apma. The pair married on 13 February 1954 from the Duguid's home and it was covered in The Australian Women's Weekly; Lowitja O'Donoghue was one of her bridesmaids. Afterwards they made their first home in the Adelaide Hills and Fred continued work as an electrician and spent periods of time (several months in total) working at the Maralinga nuclear tests.

In October 1958 Ah Chee and her husband moved to Alice Springs, alongside their one-year-old son Paul Ah Chee (later part of the Amunda band), where Fred began working at the Power House and, by the end of his career, was the chief there. In Alice Springs Ah Chee began working as a gallery attendant at the Centre for Aboriginal Artists and Craftsmen and, from the early 1980s, began working as a teacher demonstrator and interpreter/translator at the Institute for Aboriginal Development. Here she worked alongside Cliff Goddard on the Yankunytjatjara sections of the Pitjantjatjara and Yankunytjatjara to English Dictionary (1987). She also worked at the Alice Springs Hospital and Central Australian Aboriginal Congress as a liaison officer/interpreter.

Ah Chee largely retired after Fred's death of reported heart failure in 1987 and she suspects that exposure to radiation at Maralinga contributed to his early death. In her retirement she committed much more time to her art and most of her works were acrylic on canvas.

Her 2021 autobiography, Nomad Girl, was shortlisted for the Non-fiction prize at the 2022 Chief Minister's NT Book Awards.

== Publications ==
- Ah Chee, Kanakiya Myra, and Rive, Linda (2021). Nomad girl : my life on the gibber plains and beyond. Aboriginal Studies Press, Canberra, ACT.
- Ah Chee, Myra Kanakiya & Rive, Linda, 1954-, (translator,) & Pitjantjatjara Council Cultural Heritage Unit, (issuing body.) & Ara Irititja Project (S.A.) (2016). Stony land spirit : a memoir. Pitjantjatjara Council Cultural Heritage Unit, Marleston, SA.

Ah Chee's photograph collection, the "Myra Ah Chee Collection", is available through AIATSIS.
