= Gladys Elphick =

Australian activist (1904–1988)

Gladys Elphick MBE
- Born: Gladys Walters; 27 August 1904; Adelaide, South Australia
- Died: 19 January 1988 (aged 83); Daw Park, South Australia
- Monuments: Plaque on Jubilee 150 Walkway; Gladys Elphick Park
- Other names: Gladys Hughes; Gladys Adams
- Spouse(s): Walter Hughes (1922–37); Frederick Elphick (1940–69)
- Children: 2
- Relatives: Kudnarto (great-great-great grandmother); Winnie Branson, Josie Agius and Vince Copley (cousins)
- Awards: Member of the Order of the British Empire (MBE) (1971), South Australian Aborigine of the Year (1984)
- Website: www.gladyselphickawards.com

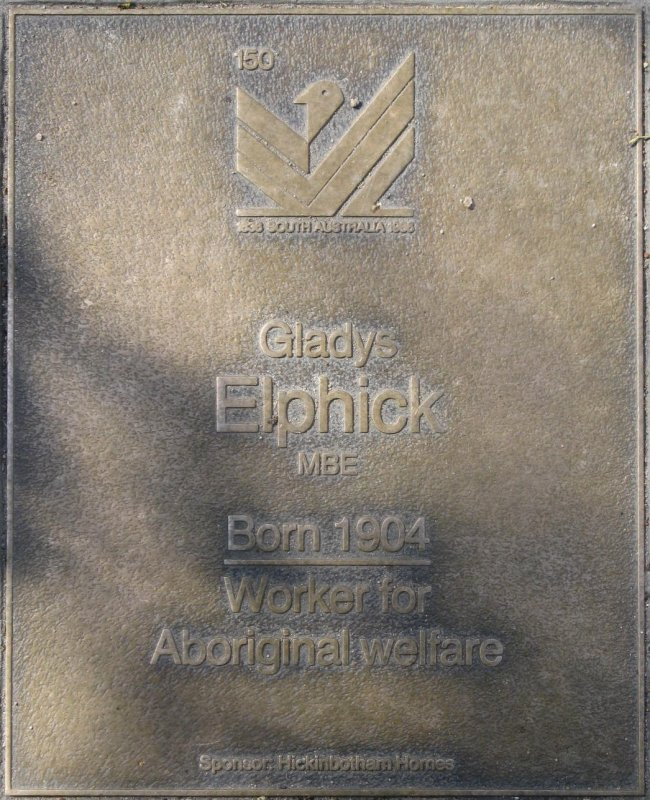
Jubilee 150 Walkway Plaque commemorating Gladys Elphick

Gladys Elphick MBE (née Walters; 27 August 1904 – 19 January 1988), also known as Gladys Hughes and Auntie Glad, was an Australian Aboriginal woman of Kaurna and Ngadjuri descent, best known as the founding president of the Council of Aboriginal Women of South Australia, which became the Aboriginal Council of South Australia in 1973.

== Early life and education ==
Gladys Walters was born on 27 August 1904 in Adelaide, South Australia, the daughter of John Herbert Walters, gas-meter inspector, and Gertrude Adams.

Her maternal great-grandmother was Kudnarto, who was known for having been the wife of a white man, Tom Adams, in the first approved mixed-race marriage in South Australia. She was descended from their son Tim, and was related to the family of Vince Copley (and his siblings Winnie Branson and Josie Agius) on his mother's side, who was descended from his brother Tom. The families were close and Copley refers to "Aunty Glad" (actually his older cousin) many times throughout his memoir, The Wonder of Little Things.

While still an infant of eight months, Gladys was taken to live with relations at Point Pearce Aboriginal mission on the Yorke Peninsula. There she attended the local school, and taught herself to play the organ.

On leaving school at age twelve, she worked in Point Pearce's dairy. She married Walter Hughes, a shearer, in 1922. After her husband's death in 1937, she (then Gladys Hughes) moved to Adelaide, lived with her cousin Gladys O'Brien (mother of Lewis Yarlupurka O'Brien), and worked as a domestic servant. She then worked at the Islington Railway Workshops in Adelaide's northern suburbs during World War II creating shells and other munitions.

She married Frederick Elphick, a soldier, in 1940.

== Community work ==
Elphick joined the Aborigines Advancement League of South Australia in the 1940s and became active in committee work with the League in the 1960s. Most of the Aboriginal members of the AALSA left to join the Aborigines Progress Association (APA). Lowitja O'Donoghue reported that she and others, including Elphick, joined the new group because they felt the need for an all-Aboriginal group, but without any ill-feeling towards the League or founding president Charles Duguid.

=== Council of Aboriginal Women of South Australia ===
In 1966, after Elphick clashed with Laurie Bryan, and others became disillusioned with the APA (which they said was run mainly by white people), she and a group of Aboriginal women broke away and formed the Council of Aboriginal Women of South Australia (CAWSA). Her cousin Winnie Branson was a co-founder, along with Maude Tongerie. Some of the other "Colebrook girls", including Lowitja O'Donoghue and Faith Coulthard, and Ruby Hammond from the Coorong, were actively involved with the Council.

CAWSA worked closely with and received substantial support from the Department of Aboriginal Affairs. Working out of an office in Pirie Street, Adelaide, they did a lot of work to support Aboriginal women and children, running programs such as the Sunday Mail blanket drive and organising a Christmas tree in Bonython Park each year. The Council was active in campaigning for the 1967 Referendum. The Council became the Aboriginal Council of South Australia in 1973, and from then included men in its remit and governance.

=== Aboriginal Cultural Centre/Nunkuwarrin Yunti ===
After the disbandment of the APA in the 1970s, the Aboriginal Cultural Centre (ACC) amalgamated with CAWSA, with Elphick as first president of the ACC. Winnie Branson was also involved in the founding of the ACC. The ACC was first incorporated in 1971, and evolved through a series of names, including Aboriginal Community Centre of South Australia and the Aboriginal Community Recreation and Health Services Centre of South Australia. In the early days, a health programme was established, funded by donations and a small amount of government funding, with the help of a dedicated doctor. The centre started accommodating several other Aboriginal and Torres Strait Islander programmes, including the Aboriginal Legal Rights Movement, Aboriginal Child Care Agency, Aboriginal Sobriety Group, National Aboriginal Congress, Aboriginal Hostels Ltd, Trachoma and Eye Health Programme, WOMA, Aboriginal Housing Board, Aboriginal Home Care, and Kumangka Aboriginal Youth Service. The service was incorporated as Nunkuwarrin Yunti of South Australia Inc. in 1994, and was named NAIDOC Organisation of the Year in South Australia in 1998. It is community-controlled and governed by an all-Indigenous board, employing more than 100 staff, and delivers a range of health care and community support services as well as being a registered training organisation.

Elphick helped to establish the College of Aboriginal Education (now Tauondi Aboriginal College) in 1973, and co-founded the Aboriginal Medical Service of South Australia in 1977.

She was known to the community as "Auntie Glad".

== Awards, honours, and legacy ==
Elphick was appointed a Member of the Order of the British Empire (MBE) in 1971 in recognition of service to the Aboriginal community.

She was named South Australian Aborigine of the Year in 1984, during National Aborigines Week.

A plaque honouring Elphick and her work for the community is part of the Jubilee 150 Walkway, a series of 150 bronze plaques set into the footpath of North Terrace, Adelaide commemorating "a selection of people who had made a significant contribution to the community or gained national and international recognition for their work".

An award has been named in her honour by the International Women's Day Committee (South Australia). Presented since 2003, it is a Community Spirit Award Acknowledging Outstanding Aboriginal Women. Known as the Gladys Elphick Award, it is awarded to recognise Aboriginal women working to advance the status of Indigenous people.

One of the parks in the western parklands of Adelaide has been named Gladys Elphick Park in her honour.

Numkuwarrin Yunti, the cultural and community centre established by Elphick, continues today.

A Google Doodle released on 27 August 2019 was dedicated to her.

As part of an arts project undertaken in 2026 by the Malinauskas state government honouring six prominent Indigenous South Australians, a statue of Elphick is to be erected in Adelaide.

=== Gladys Elphick Memorial Oration ===
The first Gladys Elphick Memorial Oration was scheduled to be given in July 2021 by journalist Stan Grant as a keynote address of the Adelaide Festival of Ideas, in collaboration with the History Trust of South Australia and Reconciliation SA. The title of the inaugural address was "Flagging Intentions", referring to the Aboriginal flag. However, it was cancelled due to the COVID-19 pandemic in Australia. The inaugural Gladys Elphick Memorial Oration was held in July 2022 with academic, artist, and community leader Simone Tur, pro vice chancellor Indigenous at Flinders University, giving the Oration. Tur explored "First Nation Matriarchs: The Role of First Nations Women in Elevating Voices".

The second oration was delivered by SA Attorney-General and Minister for Aboriginal Affairs, Kyam Maher, in 2023.

The third Gladys Elphick Oration was given by Narungga poet Natalie Harkin in August 2024, titled "APRON-SORROW / SOVEREIGN-TEA: Aboriginal Domestic Service Stories in South Australia".

=== Gladys Elphick Awards ===
Gladys Elphick Awards were established in 2003, with the following aims:

...to celebrate the life achievements of the late Aunty Gladys Elphick and her fellow members of the Council of Aboriginal Women of South Australia. The awards acknowledge the contemporary achievements of Aboriginal women who work tirelessly to advance the status of Aboriginal people through a wide range of mediums.

The awards are run by a group of volunteers, who make up the Gladys Elphick Awards Ceremony Committee. As of 2024 the awards are given in the following categories:

- Perpetual Gladys Elphick Award (Lifetime Achievement)
- Shirley Peisley Award – Aboriginal woman who is leading positive change for Aboriginal people in the workplace
- Regional Award – (actively contributing to the community and initiating positive change to the lives of others)
- Young Sister Rising Star Award – up to 30 years
- Quiet Achiever Award - Aboriginal woman who contributes substantially to the empowerment of Aboriginal people
- Young sister dreaming award - Up to the age of 18

== Personal life ==
Elphick married Walter Hughes, a shearer, in 1922, who died in 1937. She married Frederick Elphick, a soldier, in 1940. They had two sons, Timothy Hughes MBE (1919–1976) and Alfred Hughes. Timothy enlisted in the Australian Imperial Force on 4 December 1939 and fought in the Second World War, and afterwards (1953) he leased a soldier settler block of 979 acres (396 ha) at Conmurra and was highly regarded in the community. Alfred served in the regular army, and was posted to serve in the Korean War with the 1st Battalion, Royal Australian Regiment between 1951 and 54.
