= World Solar Challenge 1996 =

Trans-Australian car race

1996 World Solar Challenge
- The 4th edition of the World Solar Challenge
- Host Country: Australia
- Dates run: 24 October-5 November 1996
- Start: Darwin, Australia
- Finish: Adelaide, Australia
- Total Distance (km): 3,010

Results
- Winner: Honda (Japan)
- 2nd: Biel (Switzerland)
- 3rd: Aisin Seiki (Japan)

The 1996 World Solar Challenge was an edition of the trans-Australian solar-powered car race across 3,000 km (1,900 mi) of highway through the Australian Outback from Darwin, Northern Territory to Adelaide, South Australia.

It was the fourth such edition of the event, held every three years since 1987.

The race was won by the 'Dream II' car from Honda's research and development team for the second consecutive event, ahead of a combined engineering school team from Biel, Switzerland. Honda broke its own race record, completing the course at an average speed of 89.76 km/h.

Event founder and adventurer Hans Tholstrup sold the event to a winning bid from the South Australian Government following the 1996 edition.

== Entrants ==
There were 48 listed entrants as part of the event, with 32 completing the course.

Among those participants were teams from automotive manufacturers Honda and Mitsubishi. The Biel College of Engineering team included contributions from several schools in the Biel-Bienne region. Return competitors and pre-event favourites included Honda, Japanese automotive components manufacturer Aisin Seiki, and the Victoria-based Aurora Vehicle Association.

It also marked the first appearance of the University of New South Wales 'Sunswift' car. Cars were able to be either one or two-seaters.

== Route ==
The World Solar Challenge runs across approximately 3,000 km from Darwin, the capital of the Northern Territory, to Adelaide, the capital of South Australia.

== Results ==
Place	Team name		Country	Time (hr:mm)	Average speed (km/h)	Distance (km)
1	Honda R&D	Dream II	Japan	33:32	89.76	3010
2	United High Schools of Biel	sCHooler	Switzerland	35:00	86.00	3010
3	Aisin Seiki Co Ltd	Aisol	Japan	37:18	80.70	3010
4	Mitsubishi	Mitsubish	Japan	45:07	66.72	3010
5	University of Queensland	SunShark	Australia	46:24	64.87	3010
6	Waseda University	Waseda	Japan	46:38	64.55	3010
7	Northern Territory University	Desert Rose	Australia	48:02	62.66	3010
8	O.S.U.	Simon	Japan	49:52	60.36	3010
9	University of New South Wales	sUNSWift	Australia	56:32	53.24	3010
10	Tokyo Salesian Polytechnic	Ikuei Neo II	Japan	61.26	49.00	3010
11	Queens University		Canada	61.29	48.96	3010
12	University of Western Ontario	Sunstang	Canada	63.59	47.04	3010
13	Tokai HS		Japan	65.35	45.90	3010
14	Mino Family Team	Mino Family IV	Japan	66.57	44.96	3010
15	Tokai University		Japan	67.10	44.81	3010
16	Lake Tuggeranong College	Spirit of Canberra	Australia	67.15	44.76	3010
17	Japanese Crested Ibis	Fine	Japan	67.51	44.36	3010
18	SunBa Solar Car Team	SunBa	Brazil	68.43	43.80	3010
19	Team Kataro	Kira Kira Fighter III	Japan	70.12	42.88	3010
20	Association Helios	Helios	France	70.49	42.50	3010
21	France for W.S.C.	Heliotrope	France	71.31	42.90	3010
22	Hokkaido Automo. Eng. College	Sulis V	Japan	72.22	41.59	3010
23	Kirenjaku	Kirenjaku	Japan	73.17	41.07	3010
24	Nippon Electronics College	Sonec	Japan	73.34	40.91	3010
25	UC Berkeley / Stanford University	Afterburner	United States	74.17	40.52	3010
26	Soenderborg Teknikum	Solvogn Danmark	Denmark	74.21	40.48	3010
27	McGill University	Northern Sun	Canada	74.25	40.45	3010
28	Team Jona Sun	Jona Sun	Japan	75.59	39.61	3010
29	Yokohama National University		Japan	80:04	37.59	3010
30	Pumpkinseed		Japan	82:44	36.38	3010
31	Annesley College		Australia	83:51	35.90	3010
32	South Bank University	Mad Dog	UK	84:04	35.80	3010

=== Retirements/non-finishers ===
Team name	Car	Country	Distance (km)
Los Altos High School (Hacienda Heights, California)		United States	
Akita	Hama Zero	Japan	
Mexico Team	TONATIUH	México	1927.2
Detlef Schmitz	Helio Det	Germany	1690
Poli Solar	Citizen Eco Drive/USP	Brazil	60
Aurora	Aurora Q1	Australia	First day

=== Pre-race withdrawals ===
Team name	Car	Country
Team Holy Cheat	Holy Cheat II	UK
Dripstone High School		Australia
Kormilda College		Australia
Winston School		USA
Firm Chrisante		Italy
University Teknoligi		Malaysia
Shalom Catholic College	Goodlife Bug	Australia
Panda San	Panda San 96	Japan

== Class winners and Awards ==
A number of prizes were awarded following the event as well as recognition of individual class winners.

=== Silicon PV/Silver Zinc battery class ===
Place	Team name	Car	Country
1	Honda R&D	Dream II	Japan
2	United High Schools of Biel	sCHooler	Switzerland
3	Aisin Seiki Co Ltd	Aisol	Japan

=== Silicon PV/Lead-acid battery class ===
Place	Team name	Car	Country
1	University of Queensland	SunShark	Australia
2	University of New South Wales	Sunswift	Australia
3	France for World Solar Challenge	Heliotrope	France

=== Private class ===
Place	Team name	Car	Country
1	Mino Family Team	Mino Family IV	Japan
2	SunBA Solar Car Team	SunBA	Japan
3	Team Kataro	Kira Kira Fighter III	Japan

=== School Awards ===
Category	Team name	Car	Country
Asia	Tokai Technical High School	Tokai Falcon	Japan
Americas	Los Altos High School	Sun Shadow	USA
Europe	Association of Helios	Helios	France
Australia	Annesley College	EOS	Australia

Other Awards

Category	Team name	Car	Country
Best Amorphous	Japanese Crested Ibis	Fine	Japan
Renewable Materials Award	Team Jona Sun	Jona Sun	Japan
Mal Trainer Battler Award	South Bank University	Mad Dog	UK
GM Sunraycer Award for Technical Innovation	University of Queensland	SunShark	Australia
Katherine Clunies Ross Award	Los Altos High School	Sun Shadow	USA
