= Dawbarn =

Dawbarn is a surname. Notable people with the surname include:

- H. Dunlop Dawbarn (1915–1998), American businessman and politician
- Elizabeth Dawbarn (died 1839), English nurse and pamphleteer
- Graham Dawbarn (1893–1976), British architect
- Mary Campbell Dawbarn (1902–1982), Australian biochemist
- Spike Dawbarn (born 1974), English singer and dancer
- Wilbur Dawbarn, British comics artist and cartoonist
