= Doreen Kartinyeri =

Australian historian

- Born: Doreen Maude Kartinyeri; 3 February 1935
- Died: 2 December 2007 (aged 72)
- Occupations: Genealogist, historian, activist
- Known for: Genealogy

Doreen "Dodo" Maude Kartinyeri (3 February 1935–2 December 2007) was an Ngarrindjeri elder, historian, and genealogist, who lived in the Australian state of South Australia. In her early years, she was a domestic worker, but became interested in the family history of Aboriginal families on the Yorke Peninsula, starting with her own family. She subsequently researched and published many Aboriginal family histories, and was the founder of the Aboriginal Family History Unit at the South Australian Museum in 1988. She worked at the University of Adelaide and the University of South Australia, later being awarded an honorary doctorate for her work. She played a key role as an activist for Aboriginal people in the Hindmarsh Island bridge affair in the 1990s.

== Early life and education ==
Doreen Kartinyeri was born on 3 February 1935, in the Aboriginal reserve at Point MacLeay (now Raukkan) in South Australia, to parents Thelma (née Rigney) and Oswald (known as Oscar) Kartinyeri. Doreen was the second child. The couple also had six other children: Oscar junior, Nancy, Doris Alma, Ron, Connie, and Doris Eileen. Also living with the family were three cousins, Lila, Thelma, and Elsie, who were regarded as siblings. Oscar junior called Doreen "Dodo" owing to his childhood stutter, and she retained this name as an adult. Doris Alma and Nancy both died in 1943, Doris in hospital during a tonsillectomy and Nancy of diphtheria. Cousins Lila and Thelma were removed from the family by the Aboriginal Protection Board and placed at the Girls' Probationary School in Fullarton (later the Salvation Army Girls' Home), followed by cousin Elsie the following year.

Thelma was a member of the Red Cross, where she cooked food and sent it to needy families. She died within a month of giving birth to Doris Eileen in 1945, due to complications following the birth. Doreen was only ten at the time, and described the early death as one of the most traumatic experiences of her life. Without the knowledge of Oscar Snr, Doris Eileen was taken as an infant and placed in Colebrook Home, then in Eden Hills. Oscar, distraught, travelled as far as Victoria to search for her. In an interview on Stateline on ABC Television in 2007, Kartinyeri discussed this experience, and described herself as "a fiery girl who talked too much". She mentioned a particular time when she was trying to see her sister, Doris, when she did not know where she was, at the age of 13. She said in the interview: "so I just kicked my shoes off, climbed the top of the wall, and said, 'if you don't tell me I'm going to jump', so she told me where Doris was".

Doris was the only sibling with whom Doreen maintained contact later, as Ron was in prison.

Kartinyeri's education began in her hometown, at the Raukkan Mission School. Kartinyeri said that she did not like her teacher at this school because he was "too strict". After the death of her mother, Kartinyeri was, unwillingly, moved to the Salvation Army Home in Fullarton, on the condition that she would stay with her sister, Doris. Coincidentally, this was a lie - Doris did not go with Kartinyeri to Fullarton, but was instead sent to the Colebrook Home at Eden Hills. Kartinyeri said that the conditions of this institution were "military style”, claiming that she was beaten on her first night for swearing. She did not do well in school - she was rebellious, was punished often, performed poorly, often did not do work, and when she did, teachers accused her of cheating. She would get into mischief with the other nunga (Aboriginal) girls, and Kartinyeri claimed that they were often the scapegoats for the white girls (herself especially). In 1951 she was expelled for getting into a fight with girls who were bullying a disabled girl. From there, she never continued her formal education.

== Life and work ==
=== Domestic employment and fostering ===
After being expelled from Fullarton in 1949, Kartinyeri believed she was being sent back home to Raukkan; however, she was sent to Joan and George Dunn's house in the Adelaide Hills to work as a domestic servant for the next two years. After some time, she settled well into life at Adelaide Hills and came to love and respect her employers. After her two years with the Dunns were complete, Kartinyeri was offered another position, working for the Motterams, who lived in the Adelaide suburb of Kings Park. Having known the Motterams as friends of the Dunns and liking them, she accepted the job. While working there, she did few physical or taxing tasks, describing her main purpose as keeping Mrs Motteram company.

At the age of 15, Kartinyeri returned to Raukkan to care for her sick grandmother. She took up a position as a domestic servant for the superintendent of the mission, where her small wages went to supporting her grandparents, who were not entitled to a government pension because of their Indigenous status.

At the age of 16 (around 1951), she became a full-time foster mother, taking care of her cousins and her cousin's children. Finding motherhood exhausting, Kartinyeri went back to working domestically, taking a job at the Maitland Hotel. Deciding that caring for grandmother back home was too stressful, Kartinyeri left Raukkan and took up work sorting grapes at Barmera, in the Riverland.

=== Genealogical work ===
After her marriage to Terence Wanganeen in 1954, Kartinyeri lived at Point Pearce for the following 20 years. Reconnecting with her family, she started her family history research, and published the genealogy of the Rigney family, as well as eight generations of the Wanganeen family. Her maternal aunt, Aunty Rosie (Kropinyeri), with whom she had bonded when staying with her in her teens, had an interest in Aboriginal family history, and sparked her interest in researching further. Kartinyeri also started to examine the histories and genealogies of other Aboriginal people in the Point Pearce and Point MacLeay (Raukkan) area.

Kaurna man Lewis O'Brien visited Kartinyeri to discuss her interest in Aboriginal family history while she was living in Cummins (sometime after 1978). Lewis, who worked for the South Australian Education Department, later arranged a room for Kartinyeri at the University of South Australia (UniSA), where she could begin working formally on Aboriginal genealogies. In 1979, she undertook research in the Aboriginal Unit in the Geography Department of the University of Adelaide with professor Fay Gale, and later became one of the top Indigenous genealogists in Australia.

Kartinyeri published several books on the Indigenous people of Point Pearce and Raukkan. This led to her being offered a job by the South Australian Museum, and she started the Aboriginal Family History Unit in 1988. She also prepared artefacts for an exhibition titled "Aboriginal Culture in South Australia" at the museum at some point. As of 2026 the Aboriginal Family History Unit is run by Ali Abdullah-Highfold, and attracts hundreds of queries each year.

Kartinyeri also participated in a great deal of other genealogy-related activities. She delivered papers at a number of conferences held by the Conference of Museum Anthropologists and the Anthropological Society of South Australia. She conducted several genealogy workshops with UniSA, the Department of Technical and Further Education, and the Anthropological Society of SA, which were presented in several capital cities of Australia. From the 1970s, Kartinyeri was a guest lecturer at all three South Australian universities (UniSA, University of Adelaide, and Flinders University.

=== Hindmarsh Island Bridge ===
Kartinyeri played a significant and controversial role in the Hindmarsh Island Bridge affair in the 1990s, after the South Australian Government put forward a proposal to build a bridge between Hindmarsh Island and Goolwa. Kartinyeri quickly became a key figure in the movement against this proposal, saying that Hindmarsh Island was sacred land, particularly for Ngarrindjeri women. In early 1994, Kartinyeri's group were successful in their application to the Federal Government to gain a heritage order to prohibit the bridge being built. However, following a royal commission in March 1996 that debunked the women's claims, the Howard government re-approved the plans for the bridge and in the year 2000, it was built.

Finally, in 2010, the South Australian government recognised the honesty of Kartinyeri and her group, formally acknowledging that "women members of the Ngarrindjeri traditional owners were genuine in the mid-1990s when they said that the construction of the bridge would violate their most sacred beliefs". Years later, ABC journalist Mike Sexton, who had interviewed her not long before her death, said "She was defiant to the end. A decade after the phrase 'secret women's business' entered the Australian vernacular, Doreen Kartinyeri maintained her rage against the bridge at Hindmarsh Island".

== Recognition and awards ==
- ?: Honorary doctorate from the University of Adelaide(?) (Note: Neither the Indigenous Australia biography nor the Australian Dictionary of Biography articles about Kartinyeri mention this one.)
- 1994: South Australian Aboriginal of Year
- 1995: Honorary doctorate from the University of South Australia, in recognition of her genealogical work
- 2001: Centenary Medal, "for service to the Indigenous community, particularly through the field of genealogy"

== Personal life ==
Kartinyeri married and had children with Terry Douglas Wanganeen, first meeting at Pearce Point when Kartinyeri was visiting her Aunt Rose. Kartinyeri became pregnant in 1954, leading to the decision for her and Terry to get married and move to Point Pearce together. Kartinyeri took care of her cousins' children whilst she was pregnant, which she described as exhausting. She gave birth to a boy in December 1954, but he died from an unknown illness at seven months, a loss which she described as "one of the most traumatic experiences" in her life, the other being the early death of her mother. From 1955 to 1969, she gave birth to six more sons and two daughters, which she described as "the best thing that ever happened" to her.

Her relationship with Terry, who was an alcoholic, and very violent and abusive when under the influence, was unstable. Both parties were hostile to one another, and their marriage was often unhappy. There was one particular instance when Terry threw a leg of lamb at the door because it was under-cooked, causing Kartinyeri to become so angry that she broke a glass bottle and stabbed him in retaliation. Upon arrival to the hospital, authorities gave her a choice: she could either plead guilty to attempted murder, or spend six weeks in a psychiatric hospital. She chose to be admitted into psychiatric care. When she returned, Terry's attitude had changed significantly, but Kartinyeri had come to the conclusion that their marriage was effectively over, and she moved to Adelaide.

Kartinyeri formed a relationship with a new partner, Syd Chamberlain, a Pitjantjatjara man, after meeting him in Adelaide in 1978. They moved in together in that year, and they lived for some time in Cummins, on the Eyre Peninsula, where he had a shearing job. They lived together until 1995, when Kartinyeri moved into a separate dwelling.

Over her life, she cared for 23 foster children.

== Death and legacy ==
Kartinyeri died in Maitland Hospital on 2 December 2007, after battling stomach cancer and other illnesses.

Her work in the Aboriginal Family History Unit in the museum has assisted countless people with discovering their family histories.

== Selected works ==
- My Ngarrindjeri Calling, Aboriginal Studies Press, 2008
