= Undelya Apma =

Australian domestic servant (c.1909–1990)

Undelya "Minnie" Apma (c.1909 – 14 August 1990) was a Arrernte domestic servant who was born at Horseshoe Bend Station in the Northern Territory of Australia.

As a young girl she was adopted by Herbert Basedow, in order to work within his household, and lived in Adelaide for much of her life.

She is a member of the Stolen Generations.

== Biography ==
Apma was the fourth child of Charley Apma (Apmwe) Pelharre who was from the Jay Creek area and Joulta, a Traditional owner for Imarnte.

In May 1920, when Apma was 11, the family were living at Crown Point Station where, soon after (in June 1920) they met with Herbert Basedow. Basedow had travelled, alongside his wife Olive (Nell), to document the medical condition of Aboriginal people in the area and, through this, examined Apma and her father. Afterwards, when Charley was away from the station, Basedow took Apma from there and planned to adopt her and take her to Adelaide.

When they left Crown Point Station they were planning to first stop in Alice Springs but, while they were travelling there, in a camel-drawn buggy, damage occurred and they had to stop at Hermannsburg (Ntaria) to make repairs. The people at Hermannsburg were worried for Apma, who appeared very sad, and decided that she needed a friend of her own age for company on the journey and 12 year-old Luritja girl Tjikana (Tjikarna) Cooper was chosen to travel with her. Frieda Strehlow wrote in her diary about the exchange that the Basedow's "want to take the two girls with them to the south, female servants are too dear: 30 shillings a week".

Once in Alice Springs an agreement was made between Basedow and Robert Stott, with whom they were staying, to adopt the girls and train them in domestic duties and they were both taken to Adelaide and to the Basedow's house in Kent Town.

There were several investigations into the circumstances of Apma and Cooper's removal and, in response to accusations that the girls were adopted for the purposes of scientific study it was the response of the Basedow's that the girls where adopted "in a spirit of friendship" as they had no children of their own and that "the plight of the two appealed to them". Despite this many were convinced that the girls were primarily brought in as domestic labour and treated as such and, in 1929, a photo of them (alongside Basedow) was printed in The Register News-Pictorial, which stated they were servants.

In 1922, Frederic Urquhart the Administrator of the Northern Territory, prompted by Charley Apma, contacted the Police Commissioner of South Australia and noted that:

[While the girls] removals were sanctioned officially at the time ... a doubt seems now to have arisen as to whether they went voluntarily with Dr Basedow and whether they are now well and happy

— Frederic Urquhart, 1922, SRSA GRG 52/1

Following this inquiry a police constable visited the home and reported that the girls were well and happy.

Later, in 1928, Apma's father Charley contacted Basedow directly via telegram demanding that his daughter be returned. He said:

I am ... proper Father Alonga Minnie—my girl you been taken from New Crown ... you send em back quick—please

— Charley Apma, SLSA SRG 139

Once again further inquiries were made but no action was taken and, in 1930, John Henry Sexton, Secretary of the Aborigines' Friends' Association, added to these complaints.

When Herbert Basedow died in 1933 the grief of Ampa and Cooper, now in their early 20s, was reported The Mail (Adelaide) which referred to them both as "two sad-eyed native girls" and that they "deeply mourned the untimely death of Dr. Basedow, and refused to eat for two days". This article also reported that they would both stay with Nell Besedow, however, soon after they were 'given' to Basedow's unmarried sisters; Blanca, Elsa and Hedwig.

Little is known of their lives during this time, however, it is known that Apma had two children: Charlie who was born in 1942, who was taken by Basedow's sisters to raise as their own, and Margaret who was born in 1943, who was sent to the Colebrook Home.

Myra Ah Chee remembers visiting her Apma, when "only Hedwig was left", and said that she would knock on the door and:

Hedwig would answer but not come out. She'd only peep around the corner and then vanish, and Minnie and Tjikana would come out and get me.

— Kanakiya Myra Ah Chee, Nomad Girl, 2021

She also recalled that many family members would visit them there, sometimes as boarders when working in Adelaide, as the house was so large that it could easily accommodate everybody.

In 1958 Apma was able to return to Central Australia where she was able to reunite with her daughter Margaret; her parents had already died. During this time Apma spent many years visiting with extended family throughout Central Australia

Apma died in Alice Springs on 14 August 1990 and is buried at Alice Springs Cemetery.
