= Vince Copley =

Aboriginal activist from South Australia

Vincent Warrior Copley AM
- Born: Vincent Gilbert Copley; 24 December 1936; Adelaide, South Australia
- Died: 10 January 2022 (aged 85); Goolwa, South Australia
- Spouse: Brenda Copley (née Thomas)
- Children: Kara and Vincent
- Parent(s): Frederick Warrior and Katie Edwards
- Relatives: Kudnarto (a maternal ancestor); Gladys Elphick (cousin)
- Family: Winnie Branson (sister); Josie Agius (sister); Colin (brother; died young); Maureen
- Awards: Member of the Order of Australia (2014)

Vincent Warrior Copley AM (born Vincent Gilbert Warrior; 24 December 1936 – 10 January 2022) was an Aboriginal Australian sportsman, activist, elder, and leader.

== Early life ==
Vincent Gilbert Copley, usually known as Vince, was born into poverty on a government mission, Point Pearce, in South Australia on 24 December 1936. He was primarily Ngadjuri, but also had Kaurna, Narungga, and Ngarrindjeri ancestry. Through his grandmother Maisie May Edwards (née Adams) Copley was descended from Kudnarto, a Kaurna woman who was the first Aboriginal woman to legally marry a white South Australian colonist on 27 January 1848, when she married Thomas Adams. Copley's mother was Katie Edwards; her parents were Joe and Maisie May (née Adams). Maisie was a great-granddaughter of Kudnarto. Vincent was born the youngest of five surviving children: Winnie, Josie, Colin (who died as a teenager), and Maureen. "Papa Joe" was a Narungga man, a grandson of King Tommy, an important man who negotiated with settlers on the Yorke Peninsula.

Copley's father was Frederick Warrior, the surname an anglicised form of his father's name, Barney Waria (1873–1948). Barney Waria was one of a few last initiated Ngadjuri men, and his stories were documented by anthropologist Ronald Berndt and his wife Catherine Berndt.

After his father had died when Vincent was just 2, at the age of 10 he was voluntarily taken by his mother (who died just five years later) to St Francis House in Semaphore South, a beachside suburb of Adelaide near Port Adelaide. There he was treated with kindness, sent to the local school, and met other future Aboriginal leaders and activists, including Charles Perkins, Gordon Briscoe, John Kundereri Moriarty, Richie Bray, Malcolm Cooper, and others. He became lifelong friends with Perkins, Briscoe, and Moriarty.

Several members of his family died prematurely, including his elder brother, Colin. Vince himself nearly died aged 15 of appendicitis, after hospitals in Ardrossan and Maitland refused to admit him. Fortunately, the hospital at Wallaroo did admit him and saved his life.

Copley spent some years living and working in country towns, which were known for their racism. He worked as a sheep shearer in Curramulka on the Yorke Peninsula, and was recruited to play Aussie rules football with the local team, which he took to the premiership in 1957, 1958 and 1959. There, he stayed with the Thomas family, who included his future wife Brenda. He was also a keen cricketer in his youth.

He also played with Port Adelaide Football Club, and won the H. W. Tomkins Memorial Medal, as "the fairest and most brilliant player in the Senior Colts" (South Australian National Football League under-19s) there in 1953. In 1960, he played a season with South Adelaide. He also played for Fitzroy in Victoria, and coached the Curramulka team for more than ten years.

== Career ==
In 1965 he joined Charlie Perkins and other Aboriginal activists, along with white students from New South Wales, on the Freedom Ride, to draw attention to segregationist policies and poor living conditions of Aboriginal people in the state.

Around 1973, Copley was appointed as a project officer with the federal Department of Aboriginal Affairs and assigned the task of creating an electoral roll of Aboriginal people, a job which required a lot of travel around the country.

His friendship with Perkins led to a lot of work in Aboriginal activism and organisations from the 1970s through to the 1990s, when he would be asked by Perkins to stand in for him when he was unable to get to an event. These organisations included:

- Federal Council for the Advancement of Aborigines and Torres Strait Islanders
- National Aboriginal and Islander Liberation Movement
- the inaugural commonwealth Department of Aboriginal Affairs
- Aboriginal Development Commission
- National Aboriginal Consultative Committee
- Aboriginal Hostels Limited (executive officer, regional manager in the 1980s)
- the inaugural Barunga Festival, and the Barunga Statement, a bark petition presented to prime minister Bob Hawke
- National Aborigines' and Islanders' Day Observance Committee (NAIDOC)

He worked with John Moriarty on NAIDOC, and was the first national secretary of the organisation.

From 1982 until 1993 he worked at the Aboriginal and Torres Strait Islander Commission (commonly known as ATSIC) as sports officer. In this role, he ran a series of competitions and carnivals at which new talent could be identified, and established an annual awards sports night for Aboriginal athletes, which ran for around a decade.

Copley helped to organise the 1988 Australian Bicentenary tour of England which commemorated the first Aboriginal Australian cricket tour of 1868. The team was captained by John McGuire. From 2000, he was inaugural co-chair of Cricket Australia's National Indigenous Cricket Advisory Committee (formally established in 2001). For some of his tenure in this role, he shared the role with former SA premier John Bannon. Copley stepped down from the role at the end of 2012, as of 2013.

He was also inaugural chair of Tandanya National Aboriginal Cultural Institute, among other positions.

In later life, Copley focused on reclaiming and protection Aboriginal cultural heritage, and was involved in several native title claims for the Kaurna and Narungga people. He also worked with the World Archaeological Congress, promoting Indigenous rights across the world. He took on the role of Indigenous host of the WACs symposium on Indigenous Cultural Heritage held in Burra, South Australia in 2006.

From 2002 until 2012, he was chair of the Ngadjuri Alspa Juri Lands and Heritage Association, and from 2012, chair of the Ngadjuri Elders Heritage and Landcare Council.

After meeting in Burra, South Australia in 1998, Copley set up a research partnership with Claire Smith, and Gary Jackson of Flinders University continued for the rest of his life and beyond. In the early 2000s, working with his nephew Vincent Branson, he worked with Flinders to create Ngadjuri Heritage Project. This project identified more than 600 Ngadjuri sites, recorded oral histories, and did much research. From 2018 he held a teaching role at Flinders University on projects relating to Ngadjuri heritage.

== Other activities ==
In 1977 Copley organised for a group of Aboriginal dancers, storytellers, and artists to attend the FESTAC 77 (aka Second World Black and African Festival of Arts and Culture) in Lagos, Nigeria, which included Lillian Crombie in the Aboriginal Islander Dance Theatre.

Between 1993 and 1995, he worked in schools as a cultural awareness consultant.

During the course of his life, he visited almost every Aboriginal community in Australia. He also met the King of Jordan, Queen Elizabeth II of England, boxer Muhammad Ali, and Nelson Mandela.

In 1990, Copley was interviewed by Gordon Briscoe about his life and achievements. The recording can be found at the National Library of Australia.

== Recognition and honours ==
In the 2014 Queen's Birthday honours list, Copley was awarded Member of the Order of Australia, "For significant service to the Indigenous community as an advocate for the improvement of social, legal and economic rights and cultural identity", by Hieu Van Le, governor of South Australia.

== Book and stories ==
His memoir, The Wonder of Little Things, published posthumously in December 2022, was created from Copley's hundreds of recollections, told orally as stories by Lea McInerney. Copley was able to review the complete manuscript and answer the publisher's questions on the final revision before his death. The book includes photographs as well as suggested reading, and a timeline of important events in Australian and Indigenous history.

He relates in his book that there were several influential women in his life too, including his sisters Josie and Winnie (Branson), and their "Aunty Glad" (actually their cousin, Gladys Elphick, who among other achievements, founded the Council of Aboriginal Women of South Australia and the Aboriginal Medical Service).

== Personal life ==
Copley married Brenda Thomas, who died in 2020, and they had children, Kara and Vincent.

Sometime before 2014, Copley adopted the middle name "Warrior".

Copley's sisters Winnie Branson and Josie Agius also became prominent - Branson as an activist and first South Australian state secretary of FCAATSI in 1967, and Agius as one of South Australia's first Aboriginal health workers.

== Death and legacy ==
Copley died on 10 January 2022 at his home in Goolwa. John Moriarty paid tribute to his friend.

Copley's death preceded the end of the 30-year embargo on the work of Ronald and Catherine Berndt, so he was never able to see the stories told by his grandfather Barney Waria to them.

Over the course of his life, Copley helped to reform South Australian race and marriage laws; to create the South Australian Lands Trust laws; and to get the Aboriginal Welfare Board legislation repealed in the state. He helped to bring about the first Aboriginal education and training centre at the University of Adelaide, which later moved to UniSA.

The Vince Copley Medal is an annual award recognising the "most outstanding cricketer" at the Lord's Taverners's Statewide Indigenous Carnival.

== See also ==
- History of Adelaide
- Mimbara Conservation Park
