= Phyllis Duguid =

Australian teacher and activist

Phyllis Duguid OAM
- Born: Phyllis Evelyn Lade; 16 October 1904; Hawthorn, Melbourne
- Died: 9 March 1993 (aged 88); Linden Park, Adelaide
- Burial place: Ernabella Mission Cemetery
- Education: University of Adelaide (BA)
- Occupations: Teacher and social reformer
- Known for: Activism for Aboriginal and women's rights
- Spouse: Charles Duguid
- Children: Rosemary, Andrew
- Parents: Rev. Frank Lade (father); Lilian Frances Lade (née Millard) (mother)

Phyllis Evelyn Duguid OAM (16 October 1904 – 9 March 1993), née Lade, was an Australian teacher and Aboriginal rights and women's activist, who was highly regarded for her long-term commitment to those she saw as members of an underclass in society. She was married to, and often worked alongside, Charles Duguid, medical practitioner and Aboriginal rights campaigner, the couple leading much of the work on improving the lives of Aboriginal people in South Australia in the mid-twentieth century. She founded the League for the Protection and Advancement of Aboriginal and Half-Caste Women, which later became the Aborigines' Advancement League of South Australia (AALSA).

The Duguids' legacies include the Duguid Indigenous Endowment Fund at The Australian National University and the Biennial Duguid Memorial Lecture series (held in alternate years at the University of South Australia and Flinders University).

== Early life and education ==
The third child of six children, Duguid was born on 16 October 1904 at Hawthorn, Melbourne, Australia. Her father, Frank Lade (1868-1948), was a Methodist clergyman, who travelled extensively to give lectures to members of the temperance movement. The family moved to Adelaide in 1911, and Phyllis attended Miss Henderson's school for girls, and then Methodist Ladies' College (later Annesley College). Duguid's mother Lillian Frances (née Millard) strongly supported her daughter's study of Classics and English language and literature at the University of Adelaide (BA Hons, 1925), saying that "she wouldn’t allow any of us just to stay home and be what was called a homegirl, until we had done something else".

Duguid worked briefly as an English tutor at the university, later became a senior English teacher at the Presbyterian Girls' College in Adelaide (now Seymour College), and married the medical doctor Charles Duguid on 18 December 1930 at the Methodist Church, Kent Town, South Australia. They had a son and a daughter.

== Advocacy for women and Indigenous Australians ==
Duguid "epitomized the strength of gentleness" and co-promoted Charles' passion for the cause of Aboriginal justice, was a prominent activist for the welfare of Aboriginal women in her own right and edited Charles' writings. Together, they were described as being "a very powerful force".

Duguid was inspired to campaign for Indigenous issues after hearing from one of Charles' patients about the poor conditions in central and northern Australia, and the widely reported Tuckiar v The King case in 1934, in which an unfair conviction against a Yolngu man (Dhakiyarr) in the Northern Territory seven months earlier was overturned by the High Court of Australia. She heard about her husband's trip to the Pitjantjatjara and Yankunytjatjara lands in 1935, and supported his proposal to create the Ernabella Mission.

=== League for the Protection and Advancement of Aboriginal and Half-Caste Women ===
After a trip to Central Australia in 1938 with the president of the Women's Christian Temperance Union, W.E. Eaton, Duguid formed the League for the Protection and Advancement of Aboriginal and Half-Caste Women, consisting of group of non-Aboriginal women representing Christian and other women's organisations, the first of its kind in Australia. Duguid was the founding president of the League, and an active member of several committees, including the Equality Committee of the League of Women Voters.

Within its first year of operation, the League had 205 members, with a core group of 20 women who formed the executive running the organisation. Its first main goal was "to establish and maintain a welfare and recreational centre in Alice Springs for Aboriginal and half-caste women and girls, in order that the need for the provision of such centres be demonstrated". Defending this work in the face of criticism from Rev. J.H. Sexton of the Aborigines' Friends' Association, Duguid said that the work her group proposed was essentially women's work, for women and by women. The Alice Springs centre was envisaged as a social centre, where both Aboriginal and mixed-descent girls and women could improve themselves and raise their status, and also obtain protection from exploitation or abuse of any kind if necessary. There were also plans for a residential hostel. The scheme showed the League's commitment to assimilation, exceeding anything proposed by the federal government at that time. Although the federal government viewed the idea positively, plans for the social and recreational centre were interrupted by priorities demanded by the advent of World War II.

When the Aborigines' Protection League disbanded in 1946, it donated its remaining funds to the women's organisation, which then opened membership to men and became known as the Aborigines' Advancement League of South Australia (AALSA) in 1950.

The evolution of these groups showed a shift in emphasis from protection to advancement.

=== Other activities ===
Duguid described herself as a "Christian socialist".

In 1944 she fostered a six-year-old Aboriginal boy, Sydney James Cook, who had been enrolled at King's College, Adelaide, and who lived with the family until 1950, when the Duguids decided that he would be better off growing up in an Aboriginal community, and sent him to Roper River in the Northern Territory. In 1946–7 she actively supported Charles in his campaign against the creation of a rocket firing range at Woomera, South Australia.

She and Charles were prominent in AALSA, and her work was instrumental in organising the meeting at the Adelaide Town Hall in 1953 which gave the floor to five Aboriginal people (George Rankin, Mona Paul, Peter Tilmouth, Ivy Mitchell, and Geoff Barnes) and resulted in the creation of the Wiltja Hostel for Aboriginal secondary school students in the suburb of Millswood. She continued to take a close interest in the Hostel, and the couple once hosted 34 of the girls at their home over six weeks.

Duguid was active in the League of Women Voters of South Australia, becoming its final president in 1979 as well as holding other offices prior to this. She was chairperson of the first meeting of the Status of Women Council in South Australia.

She was an executive member of the WCTU and the Women's Non-Party Political Association, and board member of the South Australian government's Children's Welfare and Public Relief Board for many years.

== Writing and speaking ==
Duguid had a flair for writing and public speaking, enriched by a love of literature. She wrote and spoke on issues such as equal pay for equal work, temperance, prison reform, and prostitution.

In 1937 she wrote a pamphlet called A brief account of the Smith of Dunesk Bequest, about the bequest, comprising property in South Australia, left by Scotswoman Henrietta Smith in 1893, specifically for the benefit of Aboriginal people, which led to the foundation of the Smith of Dunesk Mission in Beltana. (Husband Charles wrote a letter to The Advertiser in 1948 which gives some details of the bequest, including that attempts had been made to divert the money from Aboriginals, and that three-quarters of the proceeds were to be used for the work of the Presbyterian Church among the aborigines at Ernabella.)

She wrote a booklet entitled The Economic Status of the Homemaker in 1944, in which she advocated "homes founded on the true partnership of men and women who are free, equal and interdependent", that "the political emancipation of women can never be complete so long as a large proportion of them are economically dependent", and argued for paying wages to homemakers.

She gave a talk arranged by the Marriage Guidance Council in 1953, in which she said it was important for young people to "realise the hardships involved in the unequal economic status of a husband and wife" and to plan accordingly.

== Later life, honours, legacy ==
Duguid was known as Kungka (woman) by Pitjantjatjara people.

In the 1987 Australia Day Honours Duguid received the Medal of the Order of Australia (OAM) for service to Aboriginal welfare.

She died on 9 March 1993 at Linden Park and her ashes were buried next to those of her husband at the Ernabella Mission Cemetery.

The Duguid Indigenous Endowment Fund was created at the Australian National University by Rosemary and Bob Douglas (the Duguids' daughter and son-in-law) and Dr Andrew Duguid (their son).

The Duguid Travelling Scholarship is enabled by an endowment made in 2002 to the ANU's Endowment for Excellence by Andrew Duguid and Rosemary Douglas in recognition of their parents' contribution.

In 1994, the Aborigines Advancement League made a large donation to the University of South Australia and Flinders University, to provide study grants for Aboriginal graduates and to conduct a memorial lecture every two years. The Biennial Duguid Memorial Lecture (held alternate years at the University of South Australia and Flinders University) is held in honour of Charles and Phyllis Duguid.
