= Winnie Branson =

Aboriginal Australian rights activist (1927–1972)

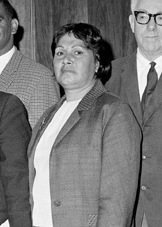
- Born: Winnifred Lillian Warrior; 1927; Point Pearce, South Australia
- Died: 1972 (aged 44–45)
- Other name: Winnie Branson in 1967
- Spouse: David Branson
- Children: 6
- Relatives: Josie Agius (sister); Vince Copley (brother); Gladys Elphick (cousin)

Winnie Branson (born Winnifred Lillian Warrior; 1927–1972) was an Aboriginal Australian rights activist. She is known as the first South Australian state secretary of FCAATSI (1967–1971), and in 1967 was part of a delegation to Canberra to meet with Prime Minister Harold Holt and MPs to lobby for the "yes" vote in the 1967 referendum. She was the sister of health worker Josie Agius and activist Vince Copley.

== Early life ==
Winnifred Lillian Warrior was born in 1927 on Point Pearce Reserve (Bookayana) on the Yorke Peninsula in South Australia. She was eldest child of Kathleen (née Edwards) and Frederick Warrior, the surname an anglicised form of his father's name, Barney Waria (1873-1948). Barney Waria was one of a few last initiated Ngadjuri men, and his stories were documented by anthropologists Ronald and Catherine Berndt.

Branson was primarily Ngadjuri, but also had Kaurna, Narungga, and Ngarrindjeri ancestry. Through her grandmother Maisie May Edwards (née Adams), Branson was descended from Kudnarto, a Kaurna woman who was the first Aboriginal woman to legally marry a white South Australian colonist on 27 January 1848, when she married Thomas Adams. Branson's mother was Katie Edwards; her parents were Joe and Maisie May (née Adams). Maisie was a great-granddaughter of Kudnarto. Winnie was the eldest of five surviving children: Josie, Colin (who died as a teenager), Maureen, and Vincent. "Papa Joe" was a Narungga man, a grandson of King Tommy, an important man who negotiated with settlers on the Yorke Peninsula.

She grew up in Bookayana and Wallaroo, working in the Point Pearce Mission dairy and helping with cleaning jobs there. Like most young Aboriginal women in that era, she was sent to work as a domestic servant at the decree of the Aborigines Protection Board from about age 14. After her father died, her mother remarried and moved to Leigh Creek, and later to Mparntwe / Alice Springs.

== Career ==
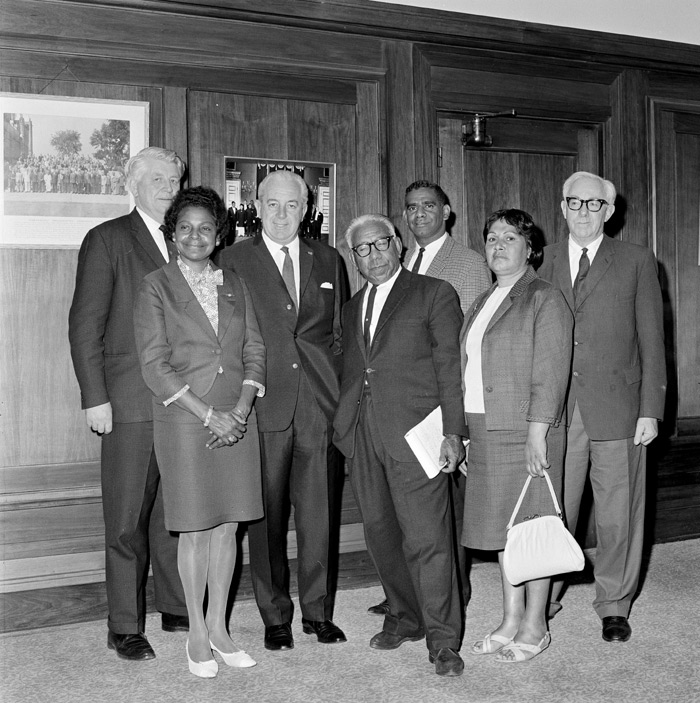
Gordon Bryant (left), prime minister Harold Holt (third from left) and Bill Wentworth (right) meeting with FCAATSI representatives (l–r) Faith Bandler, Douglas Nicholls, Burnum Burnum, and Winnie Branson

At some point, Branson worked in the laundry at the Victor Harbor Repatriation Hospital in Victor Harbor, around 80 km (50 mi) south of Adelaide. There, she met Eileen Briscoe, mother of Gordon Briscoe.

== Activism ==
Like her younger brother Vincent Copley, Branson became an activist. She was passionate about social justice issues and improving rights and conditions for her people.

In the 1960s, she was a founding member of the Aborigines' Progress Association. From the early 1960s, she attended the national FCAATSI conference in Canberra as a member of the Adelaide Delegation, where delegates identified the shared issues facing all Aboriginal Australians, as well as advocating citizenship reform and Indigenous land rights. Branson became the first South Australian state secretary of FCAATSI in 1967, holding the position until 1971. Prior to the 1967 referendum, she was a part of a delegation of Indigenous representatives who visited Canberra to lobby MPs to vote yes, where, along with Faith Bandler, Douglas Nicholls, Burnum Burnum, she met with Prime Minister Harold Holt and MPs Gordon Bryant and William Wentworth.

Later she worked with her cousin Gladys Elphick to form the Council of Aboriginal Women of South Australia and both women were involved in the founding of the Aboriginal Community Centre (Nunkuwarrin Yunti) in Wakefield Street, Adelaide. Branson was also involved in establishment of the Aboriginal Legal Rights Movement.

== Other activities ==
Branson was a co-founder of the Nunga Football Club of Adelaide, seeing football as a way to keep Aboriginal families in the community together, to share family news, and discuss political ideas.

== Recognition ==
In 2011, Branson was posthumously honoured by the National Aboriginal and Torres Strait Islander Women's Alliance (NATSIWA; formed in 2009), which acknowledged 100 Aboriginal and Torres Strait Islander women who had achieved change over the previous 100 years.

== Personal life ==
Branson joined her mother and younger siblings in Mparntwe / Alice Springs with her baby son Freddie. She met her husband, David Branson, who was of Marduntjara descent, in Mparntwe. They had six children: Fred, Patricia, Roslyn, Betty, David, and Vincent.

The family moved to Pine Point, on the Yorke Peninsula for a while, ultimately settling in the Adelaide suburb of Taperoo, where Winnie became involved in the growing Aboriginal activism of the era advocating for better support and living conditions for Aboriginal people who had left their regional homes to live in Adelaide. Winnie also lived in Port Augusta at some point.

One of her daughters is Patricia Waria-Rea, who was brought into her mother's activism aged 14, which inspired her to become a rights activist as well.

== Death and legacy ==
Branson died in 1972. Aunty Dulcie Flower AM said in 2024 that Branson had been one of her mentors.

An award named in her honour, the Winnie Branson Cup, is presented to the winning football team at the annual SA Aboriginal Football and Netball Carnival each year. Another award at the Carnival honours her sister - the Josie Aguis Trophy.

A meeting room in the SA Department for Infrastructure and Transport building is named "Winnie Branson".
