= Nellie Lester =

Australian nurse (1924-1989)

Nellie Lester (24 October 1924 - 3 February 1989) was a Yankunytjatjara nurse who became the first fully qualified Aboriginal nurse in South Australia and is believed to be the first in Australia.

== Early life ==
Lester was born at Granite Downs, which was then operating as a cattle station, and she was the daughter of Charles Lester, who worked as a dingo scalper and later pastoralist, and Kuma, a Yankunytjatjara woman. The couple had seven children together and Lester was their third eldest.

In 1929 her father sent her to join her older sisters Emily and Linda in living at the Colebrook Home in Oodnadatta where he paid for their board there; over the following years each of her siblings would also be sent here. The home was run by the United Aborigines Mission (UAM) who believed that Aboriginal children needed to be 'rescued' from their exposure to Aboriginal people and had the aim to 'civilise' them. They believed this to be particularly important for children like Lester, who were of 'mixed descent' and hoped that, with their methods, they could be assimilated into white society. Because of this a focus of Lester's learning at the home was learning domestic duties which would qualify her to work in someone else's home or, perhaps, in the care of her own.

More general education was undertaken at the nearby Quorn Public School, where she received dux and, following this success she was enrolled in Quorn High School. She was the first resident from the Colebrook Home to be enrolled there.

Lester did not want to become a domestic worker and, after finishing high school in 1940, she worked as an assistant teacher at the school at Ooldea Mission which, like the Colebrook Home, was established by the UAM. This was despite Lester's desire to become a nurse as, at that time in South Australia, it was not legally possible to an Aboriginal person to be trained in this.

In 1943, with the help of the UAM, she petitioned the South Australian Aborigines Protection Board to allow her to travel interstate to become a nurse and was granted limited exemption to allow this travel. With permission granted Lester travelled to Melbourne where she trained at Bethesda Hospital in Richmond.

== Career as a nurse ==
Lester was grateful that the Bethesda Hospital allowed her to train, especially as other ‘hospitals would not at that time do so’ and she passed her final nursing examinations in 1945. She is believed to have been the first fully qualified Aboriginal nurse in Australia.

In 1946 Lester further studied midwifery and trained at two South Australian hospitals, the McBride Maternity Hospital and the Queen Victoria Maternity Hospital, which had not previously been allowed. She was the first Aboriginal nurse in South Australia to hold two certificates.

In 1947 she also trained in infectious diseases.

Following the completion of these certificates Lester worked at a series of South Australian hospitals until 1953 when she took a role with the Heidelberg Repatriation Hospital in Victoria where her sister Linda also worked. In this role she was an employee of the Commonwealth Public Service.

On 14 February 1959 she married James Joseph Nihill and, as a public servant, had to retire on the day of her marriage. Despite her formal retirement she continued to work part time at nursing homes and the couple had two children together.

== Later life and death ==
Lester died on 3 February 1989.
