= Rob Riley (Aboriginal activist) =

Robert Riley (10 December 1954 – 1 May 1996) was an Aboriginal activist advancing Indigenous issues in Australia.

== Early life ==
Soon after his birth, he was removed from his family and placed in state care at Sister Kate's in Queens Park, Western Australia. He was almost ten years old before he knew his mother was alive and was reunited with his family when he was 12. He wrote a publication whilst he was the CEO of the Western Australian Aboriginal Legal Service Inc telling of his experience of forced removal (known as the Stolen Generations). Telling Our Story was described as "the most comprehensive description of the experience of Aboriginal people removed from their families undertaken in Western Australia".

He got involved in activist politics in the late 70’s and came into prominence during the Noonkanbah dispute of 1980 when he was working at the WA branch of the Aboriginal Legal Service. This protest paved the way for the modern land right movement"

== Later life and death ==
Riley was Chairperson of the National Aboriginal Council and part of the negotiating team on the Native Title Act.

On the national political stage, Riley was senior advisor to the Minister for Aboriginal Affairs, as well as Head of the Aboriginal Issues Unit of the Royal Commission into Aboriginal Deaths in Custody.

He established the Perth Aboriginal Medical Service, the Aboriginal Child Care Agency, the Centre for Aboriginal Studies at Curtin University and Western Australia Aboriginal Media Association. He was awarded the Human Rights Medal in 1996.

In 1995, Riley announced in two speeches that a trio of older boys had sexually abused him during his time at Sister Kate's. On 1 May 1996, Riley died by suicide in Perth at the Bentley Motor Lodge. In the days leading to his death, he was unemployed and was charged with major motor infractions.

== Honours ==
In 2004, the Centre of Aboriginal Studies established the Rob Riley Memorial Lectures in his honour.
