= Lowitja O'Donoghue =

Australian public administrator (1932–2024)

Dr Lowitja O'Donoghue AC CBE DSG
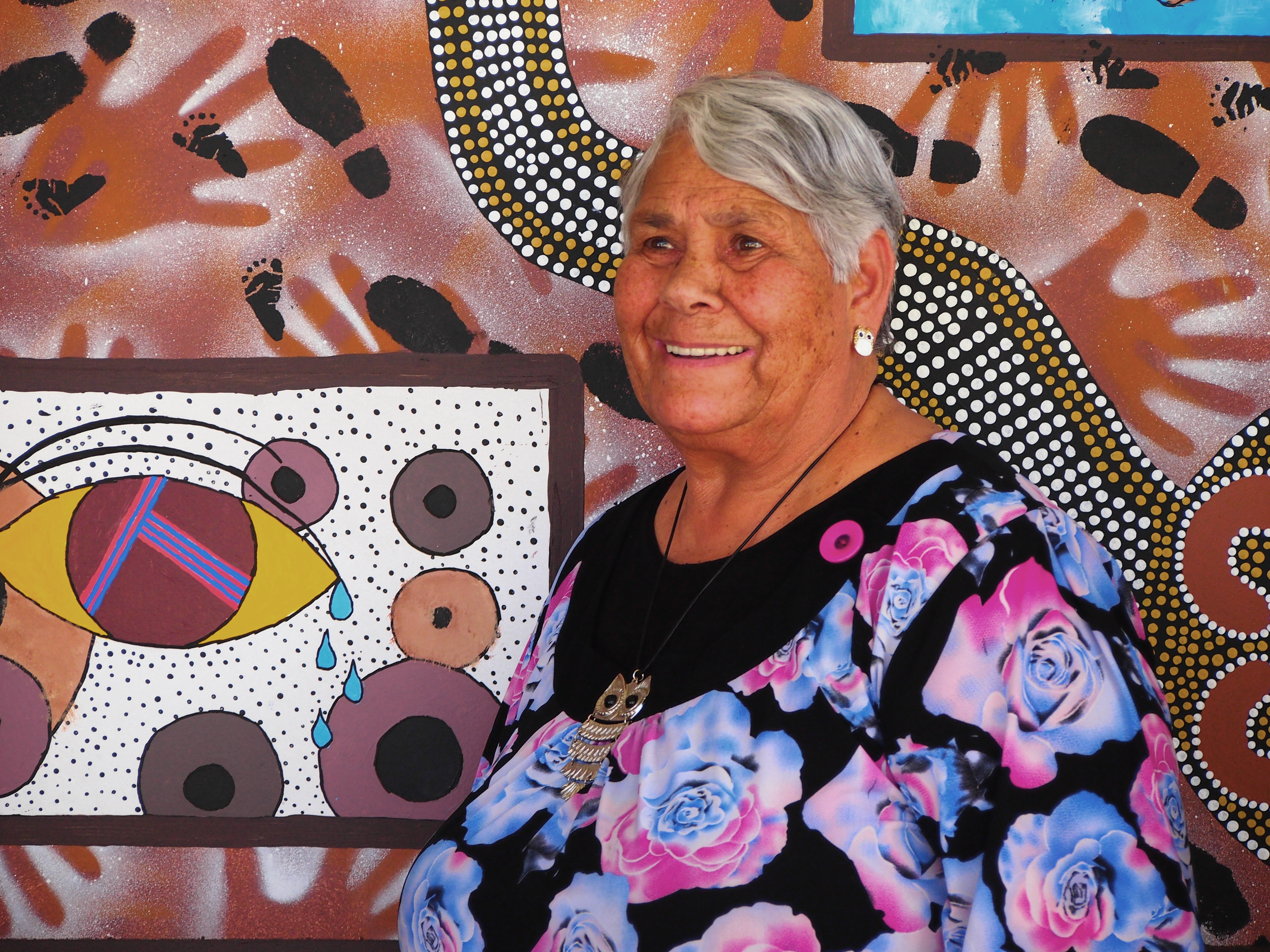
- O'Donoghue in 2013

Chairperson of the Aboriginal and Torres Strait Islander Commission
- In office 1990–1996
- Preceded by: Office established
- Succeeded by: Gatjil Djerrkura

Personal details
- Born: August 1932 De Rose Hill, South Australia
- Died: 4 February 2024 (aged 91) Adelaide, South Australia
- Spouse: Gordon Smart (died 1991)
- Known for: Public service

Lowitja O'Donoghue AC CBE DSG (August 1932 (Note: The date 1 August 1932 was assigned by missionaries after she was placed at the Colebrook Home.) – 4 February 2024), also known as Lois O'Donoghue and Lois Smart, was an Australian public administrator and Indigenous rights advocate. She was the inaugural chairperson of the Aboriginal and Torres Strait Islander Commission (ATSIC) from 1990 to 1996. She is known for her work in improving the health and welfare of Indigenous Australians, and also for the part she played in the drafting of the Native Title Act 1993, which established native title in Australia.

O'Donoghue was the inaugural patron and namesake of the Lowitja Institute, a research institute for Aboriginal and Torres Strait Islander health and wellbeing established in 2010, which in 2022 established the Lowitja O'Donoghue Foundation.

The Lowitja O'Donoghue Oration is held annually by the Don Dunstan Foundation, in her honour.

== Early life and education ==
Lowitja O'Donoghue, whose birth was unregistered, was born in August 1932, and later assigned the birthdate of 1 August 1932 by missionaries. She was born on a cattle station later identified in her official biography as De Rose Hill in the far north of South Australia (now in the APY Lands, not far from Iwantja). She was the fifth of six children of Tom O'Donoghue, a stockman and pastoral lease holder of Irish descent, and Lily, an Aboriginal woman whose tribal name was Yunamba. Lily was a member of the Yankunytjatjara Aboriginal clan of northwest South Australia. Lowitja was baptised by a pastor from the United Aborigines Mission.

Tom O'Donoghue had joined his older brother Mick in central Australia in 1920, and broke horses at Granite Downs until 1923 when he was granted a 1,166-square-kilometre (450 sq mi) pastoral lease at De Rose Hill. After the birth of Eileen in 1924, Tom and Lily had another five children up to 1935. Mick O'Donoghue had two boys – Parker and Steve – with an Aboriginal woman called Mungi. Mick handed the boys over to missionaries of the United Aborigines Mission (UAM) at Oodnadatta before they turned four years of age. In March 1927, Tom O'Donoghue handed his first two children – three-year-old Eileen and the infant Geoffrey – to the UAM at Oodnadatta, and the following month the mission moved 700 km (430 mi) south to Quorn in the Flinders Ranges, where the mission, named the Colebrook Home, was established in a cottage above the town.

In September 1934, aged two years, Lowitja was removed from her mother, and handed over to the missionaries at the Colebrook Home (on behalf of South Australia's Aboriginal Protection Board), along with her four-year-old sister Amy, and her six-year-old sister Violet. Upon arrival at the home, Lowitja met her other siblings, now ten-year-old Eileen and eight-year-old Geoffrey. The missionaries called her Lois and gave her a date of birth of 1 August 1932. They also assigned a place of birth. She had no memory of any time spent with her parents as an infant. She later (sometime after 1994) changed her name back to Lowitja.

According to O'Donoghue, she was very happy living at Colebrook and said she received a sound education both there and at the Quorn Primary School. The Quorn community at large actively encouraged children from the home to participate in local events, and assisted in the maintenance of the home. Only a few people objected to the integration. In 1944 Colebrook Home moved to Eden Hills, South Australia, due to chronic water shortages, enabling her to attend Unley High School, a local public school, and obtain her Intermediate Certificate. She was taught up until the Leaving Certificate standard but did not sit for the examination.

After the publication of the Bringing Them Home report in 1997, she said she preferred the word "removed" to the word "stolen" (as used in Stolen Generations) for her personal situation. She was the youngest child in her family, and was two years old when she was removed from her mother. After she was removed, she did not see her mother again for 33 years. During that time, her mother did not know where her family had been taken.

At the age of 16 she was sent to work as a domestic servant for a large family at Victor Harbor.

== Nursing ==
After two years of working as a servant in Victor Harbor, O'Donoghue worked as a nursing aide in the seaside town and did some basic training. She then applied to be a student nurse in Adelaide. After a long struggle to win admission to train at the Royal Adelaide Hospital (RAH), including lobbying the premier of South Australia (Thomas Playford) and others in government, in 1954 she became a nurse at the Royal Adelaide Hospital (one source claims she was the first Aboriginal person to become such). In 1994 she said: "I'd resolved that one of the fights was to actually open the door for Aboriginal women to take up the nursing profession, and also for those young men to get into apprenticeships".

She remained at RAH for ten years, after graduating in 1958 being promoted first to staff sister and then to charge nurse.

In 1962 O'Donoghue went to work for the Baptist Overseas Mission working in Assam, northern India, as a nurse relieving missionaries who were taking leave back in Australia. Due to the nearby Sino-Indian War she was advised by the Australian government to evacuate to Calcutta, from where she would depart for her return to Australia. She was "probably the first part-aborigine to be appointed from Australia to an overseas mission".

== Public service ==
After returning in 1962, she worked as an Aboriginal liaison officer with the South Australian Government's Department of Education. She later transferred to the SA Department of Aboriginal Affairs and was employed as a welfare officer based mainly in the north of the state, in particular at Coober Pedy. There, in the late 1960s, she learnt of her true name, Lowitja, and also that her mother was living in poor conditions in Oodnadatta.

In 1967 O'Donoghue joined the Commonwealth Public Service as a junior administrative officer in an Adelaide office of the Office of Aboriginal Affairs.

Around 1973-4 she was appointed as regional director of the Department of Aboriginal Affairs in South Australia, the first woman to hold a position like this in a federal government department. In this role she was responsible for the local implementation of national Aboriginal welfare policy.

After a short while she left the public service and had various management/administrative roles with non-government organisations. She was then appointed by the government as chairperson of the Aboriginal Development Commission.

== Other roles and activities ==
As part of her battle to be accepted for training as a nurse at the Royal Adelaide in 1954, O'Donoghue met white Aboriginal advocate Charles Duguid, and joined the Aborigines' Advancement League of South Australia.

She campaigned for a Yes vote in the 1967 referendum.

From 1970 to 1972, she was a member of the Aboriginal Legal Rights Movement.

In 1977, after the restructuring of the National Aboriginal Consultative Committee (established by the Whitlam government in 1973) into the National Aboriginal Conference, O'Donoghue was appointed founding chairperson of the new organisation, created by the Commonwealth Government.

In 1990, O'Donoghue was appointed Chairperson of the Aboriginal and Torres Strait Islander Commission (ATSIC), a position she held until 1996. Attending a cabinet meeting in 1991, she used the occasion to put forward ATSIC's position with regard to the government's response to the Royal Commission into Aboriginal Deaths in Custody. Her leadership in this position was greatly respected and admired. She was replaced as chairperson of ATSIC by Gatjil Djerrkura, who was considered by the Howard government to be more moderate.

In 1992 she received an SA Great Award.

In December 1992, O'Donoghue became the first Aboriginal Australian to address the United Nations General Assembly during the launch of the United Nations International Year of Indigenous Peoples (1993).

Following the 1992 Mabo decision by the High Court of Australia, O'Donoghue was a leading member of the team negotiating with the federal government relating to native title in Australia. Together with prime minister Paul Keating, she played a major role in drafting the bill which became the Native Title Act 1993, and Keating shortlisted her for the position of Governor-General of Australia in 1995, which ultimately went to Sir William Deane.

On 29 April 1998, she delivered the Australian Library Week Oration at Tandanya National Aboriginal Cultural Institute in Adelaide, win which she stressed the importance of high quality library and information services to Indigenous Australians.

On 24 January 2000, O'Donoghue was the first Indigenous person to give the annual national address as part of Australia Day celebrations.

In 2000, O'Donoghue chaired the Sydney Olympic Games National Indigenous Advisory Committee. She was a member of the Volunteers Committee for the games, and carried the Olympic torch through Uluru.

In 2008, prime minister Kevin Rudd asked her for advice during his preparation for the Apology to the Stolen Generations.

She was the patron of a number of health, welfare, and social justice organisations over the years, including Reconciliation South Australia, the Bob Hawke Prime Ministerial Centre at the University of South Australia, the Don Dunstan Foundation, and CATSINaM (Congress of Aboriginal and Torres Strait Islander Nurses and Midwives).

== Recognition and honours ==
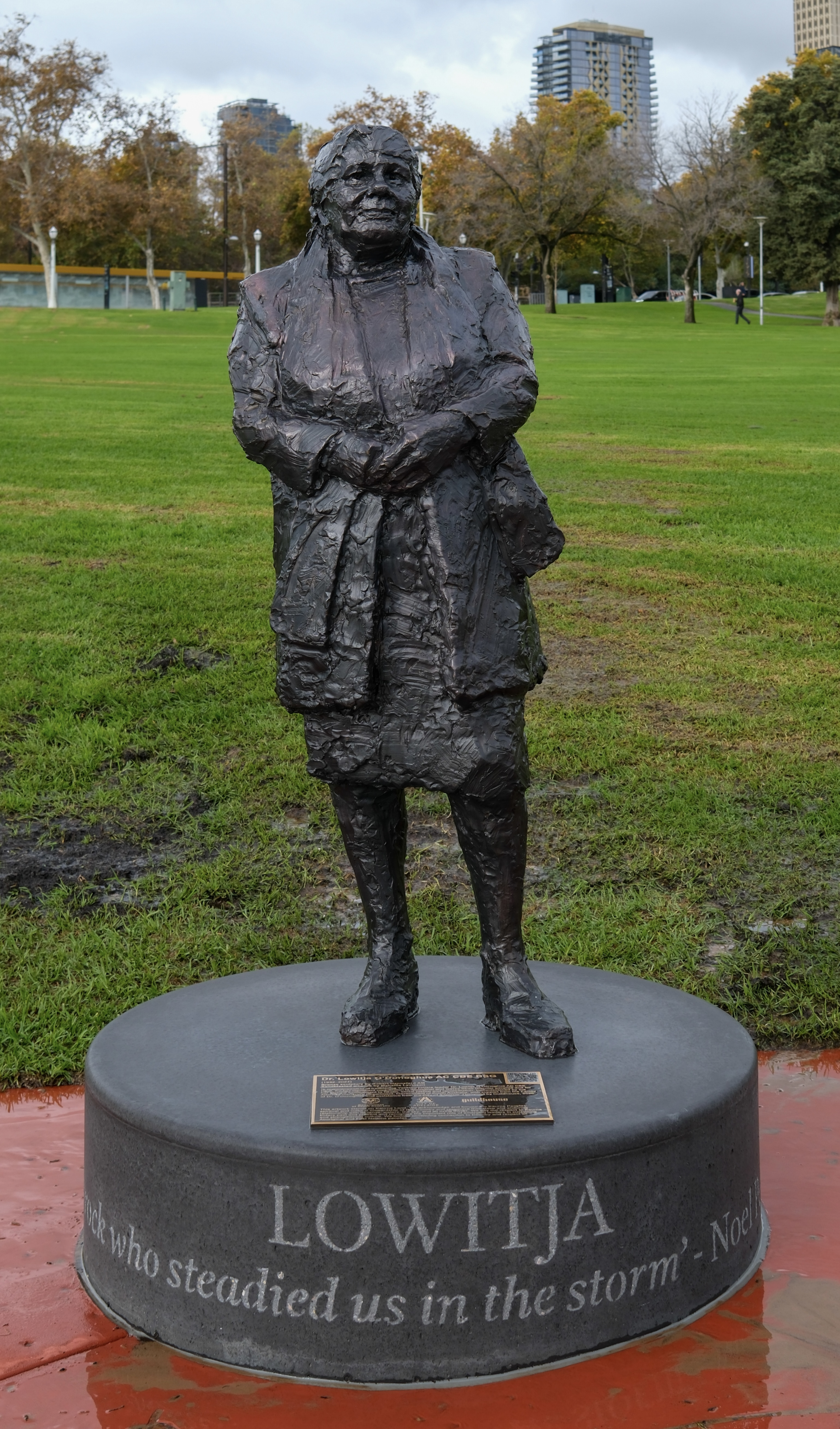
Statue of Lowitja at Elder Park, 2026

In the 1976 Australia Day Honours, O'Donoghue became the first Aboriginal woman to be inducted into the new Order of Australia founded by the Labor Commonwealth Government. The appointment, as a Member of the Order (AM) was "for service to the Aboriginal community".

In 1982 she won an Advance Australia Award.

O'Donoghue was appointed a Commander of the Order of the British Empire (CBE) in the 1983 New Year Honours for service to the Aboriginal community, and was named Australian of the Year in 1984, for her work to improve the welfare of Australian Aboriginal and Torres Strait Islander people.

In 1995, the Royal College of Nursing, Australia awarded her an honorary fellowship, and in 1998 she was awarded an honorary fellowship from the Royal Australasian College of Physicians.

In 1998 she was declared an National Living Treasure.

O'Donoghue was appointed a Companion of the Order of Australia (AC) in the 1999 Australia Day Honours, "for public service through leadership to Indigenous and non-Indigenous Australians in the areas of human rights and social justice, particularly as chairperson of the Aboriginal and Torres Strait Islander Commission".

O'Donoghue was inducted into the Olympic Order in 2000 and onto the Victorian Honour Roll of Women in 2001.

In 2005 or 2006, O'Donoghue was invested as a Dame of the Order of St Gregory the Great (DSG) by Pope John Paul II.

In 2006 artist Robert Hannaford painted a portrait of O'Donoghue for the National Portrait Gallery in Canberra.

In 2009 she received the NAIDOC Lifetime Achievement Award.

In May 2017, O'Donoghue was one of three Indigenous Australians, along with Tom Calma and Galarrwuy Yunupingu, honoured by Australia Post in the 2017 Legends Commemorative Stamp "Indigenous leaders" series to mark the 50th anniversary of the 1967 referendum.

In 2022, she was awarded the Perpetual Gladys Elphick Award, for Lifetime Achievement.

=== Academia ===
In 2000 O'Donoghue was awarded an honorary professorial fellow at Flinders University and became a visiting fellow at Flinders University.

O'Donoghue received at least six honorary doctorates Australian universities. (Note: Although a few sources suggest that she also had one from Murdoch University, her name is not listed on the Murdoch University list of honourees.) These include:

- Australian National University (law)
- Notre Dame University (law)
- Flinders University
- University of South Australia
- Queensland University of Technology
- In September 2021, O'Donoghue was awarded an honorary doctorate from the University of Adelaide for her "lifetime contribution to the advancement of Aboriginal and Torres Strait Islander rights, leading to significant outcomes in health, education, political representation, land rights and reconciliation".

=== Biography ===
In September 2020, an authorised biography of her life titled Lowitja: The Authorised Biography of Lowitja O'Donoghue, written by Stuart Rintoul, was published. Rintoul formerly journalist and senior writer at The Australian, is also an expert in Indigenous languages and history. The book was shortlisted for a Walkley Award for Best Non-Fiction Book, and was highly commended in the National Biography Awards in 2021.

== Lowitja O'Donoghue Oration ==
Since her inaugural oration at the Don Dunstan Foundation in 2007, the Lowitja O'Donoghue Oration has been held annually by the Foundation at the University of Adelaide, with a series of speakers illuminating aspects of Indigenous Australians' past and future in Australian society. It is held each year in Reconciliation Week, with the 2007 event celebrating the 40th anniversary of the 1967 referendum. Each orator was chosen by O'Donoghue.

Speakers have included:
- 2007: Lowitja O'Donoghue
- 2008: Tim Costello
- 2009: Jackie Huggins and Fred Chaney
- 2010: Ray Martin
- 2011: Paul Keating
- 2012: Michael Kirby
- 2013: Olga Havnen
- 2014: Pat Dodson
- 2015: Marcia Langton
- 2016: Lynn Arnold
- 2017: Frank Brennan
- 2018: Noel Pearson
- 2019: David Rathman
- 2020: No event due to the COVID-19 pandemic in Australia
- 2021: Pat Anderson
- 2022: Linda Burney
- 2023: Anthony Albanese
- 2024: Tom Calma
- 2025: Romlie Mokak
- 2026: Larissa Behrendt

== Lowitja Institute ==
The Lowitja Institute is a national research centre known as a Cooperative Research Centre or CRC, focusing on Aboriginal and Torres Strait Islander health. It was established in January 2010 and named in honour of its patron.

The Lowitja Institute Aboriginal and Torres Strait Islander Health CRC (also known as the Lowitja Institute CRC), funded by the Australian Government's Cooperative Research Centres programme, was part of the Institute until 30 June 2019. The history of this and the whole Lowitja Institute dates from the first CRC, the CRC for Aboriginal and Tropical Health (CRCATH), which was founded in Darwin in 1997 with Lowitja as inaugural chair. Based on its success, two further CRCs were funded by the government: CRC for Aboriginal Health (CRCAH, 2003–2009), followed by the CRC for Aboriginal and Torres Strait Islander Health (CRCATSIH, 2010–2014), this time hosted by the new Lowitja Institute. The Lowitja Institute CRC developed three research programmes and conducted workshops.

Both the Institute and the CRCs have led reform in Indigenous health research, with Aboriginal and Torres Strait Islander people determining the outcomes.

As of January 2020, there are 12 member organisations of the Lowitja Institute, including AIATSIS, the Australian Indigenous Doctors' Association (AIDA), Flinders University, the Menzies School of Health Research, the Healing Foundation and the University of Melbourne. Directors of the Institute include June Oscar, Pat Anderson, and Peter Buckskin.

The Institute provides project grants for up to three years to Aboriginal and Torres Strait Islander organisations or groups undertaking research focused on improving Indigenous health and wellbeing. The main requirement is that the research aligns with the themes of the Lowitja Institute Research Agenda of empowerment, sovereignty, connectedness, and cultural safety in the healthcare setting.

=== Lowitja O'Donoghue Foundation ===
On 1 August 2022, the day on which O'Donoghue celebrated her 90th birthday, the Lowitja Institute announced the establishment of the Lowitja O'Donoghue Foundation. The Foundation is a charitable organisation which seeks funding for scholarships to assist Aboriginal and/or Torres Strait Islander people to pursue nursing studies or to work in the public service sector; and to build an archive and educational resources relating to O'Donoghue's life and achievements.

== Marriage and personal life ==
In 1979 O'Donoghue married Gordon Smart, a medical orderly at the Repatriation Hospital, whom she had first met in 1964. He died in 1991 or 1992. He had six adult children from a previous marriage, but they had no children together.

She cited Martin Luther King, Nelson Mandela, Archbishop Tutu, Don Dunstan, and Paul Keating as having provided inspiration to her, and also praised the Fraser government for having passed the Land Rights Act in 1976.

Featured on ABC Television's Compass in 1997, O'Donoghue said that she felt "angry about the policy that removed us and also took away our culture, took away our language and took away our families... [and] about the mission authorities for not in fact keeping in touch with my mother and at least sending her some photographs so she could know that we were OK and what we looked like".

== Later life, death, and legacy ==
O'Donoghue retired from public life in 2008, and in her later years was cared for by her family on Kaurna land in South Australia.

On 4 February 2024 her family announced in a statement she had died in Adelaide. O'Donoghue was 91.

On 8 March 2024, a state funeral was held in St Peter’s Cathedral in North Adelaide, which was attended by prime minister Anthony Albanese, Minister for Indigenous Australians Linda Burney, governor-general of Australia David Hurley, South Australian premier Peter Malinauskas, and governor of South Australia Frances Adamson, Lowitja Foundation chair Pat Anderson, and hundreds of relatives, friends, and supporters. Oscar played tribute to her "enormous contribution", saying "Dr O'Donoghue had an extraordinary lifelong career of service [and] she played a leading role in many of the major political movements across her long lifetime".

=== Posthumous recognition ===
In the proposed redistribution of electorates in South Australia after the 2025 Australian federal election, the Division of Grey was recommended to be changed to O'Donoghue in her honour.

On 2 June 2026, a life-sized statue of O'Donoghue sculpted by Robert Hannaford was unveiled in the Tarntanya Wama / Elder Park walkway. This is the first of a series of statues of South Australian Indigenous Australians in a project undertaken by the Malinauskas state government. Those to follow are: Gladys Elphick, Alitya Rigney, David Unaipon, Yami Lester, and Garnett Ian Wilson.
