= Mary Campbell Dawbarn =

Australian biochemist and nutritional physiologist

Mary Campbell (Mollie) Dawbarn
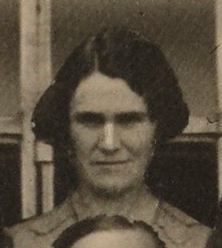
- Dawbarn in 1933
- Born: 5 January 1902; Ballarat, Victoria, Australia
- Died: 24 May 1982 (aged 80); Adelaide, South Australia, Australia
- Education: University of Adelaide; Methodist Ladies College, Adelaide
- Known for: Influential research on the B complex vitamins.

Mary Campbell "Mollie" Dawbarn (5 January 1902 – 24 May 1982) was an Australian biochemist and nutritional physiologist. She is particularly well known for her research on B complex vitamins. Producing an assay for vitamin b12 and perfecting the methods for estimating B1 vitamin in bread are among her most notable works.

== Early life and education ==
The daughter of Gilbert Joseph Dawbarn and Mary Isabella Macdonald, she was born in Ballarat and moved to South Australia in 1907. Dawbarn won a scholarship to the Methodist Ladies College in Adelaide. She earned a BSc and a MSc from the University of Adelaide in 1923 and 1928 respectively. She achieved her DSc from the same university in 1958.

== Career ==
She began work in 1924 as a biochemistry demonstrator at the university. In 1927, she became a research chemist for the Animal Products Research Foundation, University of Adelaide. While on study leave from 1933 to 1934, she worked at the Lister Institute of Preventive Medicine in London and the University of Strasbourg in France. During World War II, she conducted research for the Australian armed forces into nutritional requirements. In 1954, she was named principal research officer for the Division of Biochemistry and General Nutrition, at the Commonwealth Scientific and Industrial Research Organisation. She retired in 1963.

== Later life ==
During her retirement, she traveled for several years and later served as treasurer for the South Australian Ornithological Association. She was very interested in photography and was an expert photographer herself. She produced black-and-white enlargements by herself. She was also member of Adelaide Lyceum and Soroptimist club. Dawbarn died in Adelaide at the age of 80. After her death, her body was cremated.

== Publications ==
- Dawbarn, Mary C. (1932a), "Thorburn Brailsford Robertson: Bibliography", The Australian Journal of Experimental Biology and Medical Science, Vol.9, No.1, (January 1932), pp. 7-21.
- Dawbarn, Mary C. (1932b), "The Nucleo-Cytoplasmic Ratio of the White Mouse and its Variation with Age", The Australian Journal of Experimental Biology and Medical Science, Vol.9, No.1, (January 1932), pp. 213-226.
- Robertson, Thorburn Brailsford, Marston, Hedley R., Dawbarn, Mary C., Walters, J.W. (John Ward Walters) & Wilson, J.D.O. (James D.O. Wilson) (1932), "The Effects of Moderate Overdosage of Vitamin D and of Vitamins A+D on the Growth Rate and Longevity of the White Mouse", The Australian Journal of Experimental Biology and Medical Science, Vol.9, No.1, (January 1932), pp. 203-212.
