= Charles Duguid =

Australian doctor and Aboriginal rights campaigner (1884–1986)

Charles Duguid OBE
- Born: 6 April 1884; Saltcoats, Ayrshire, Scotland
- Died: 5 December 1986 (aged 102); Kent Town, South Australia
- Burial place: Ernabella Mission Cemetery
- Monuments: Jubilee 150 Walkway, North Terrace, Adelaide
- Education: University of Glasgow (MA, MBChB)
- Occupations: Medical doctor, surgeon
- Known for: Activism for Aboriginal rights
- Spouse(s): Irene (née Young); Phyllis Duguid
- Children: 3

Charles Duguid (6 April 1884 – 5 December 1986) was a Scottish-born Australian medical practitioner, social reformer, Presbyterian lay leader and Aboriginal rights campaigner who lived in Adelaide, South Australia for most of his adult life, and recorded his experience working among the Aboriginal Australians in a number of books. He founded the Ernabella mission station in the far north of South Australia. The Pitjantjatjara people gave him the honorific Tjilpi, meaning "respected old man". He and his wife Phyllis Duguid, also an Aboriginal rights campaigner as well as women's rights activist, led much of the work on improving the lives of Aboriginal people in South Australia in the mid-twentieth century.

The Duguids' legacies include the Duguid Indigenous Endowment Fund at The Australian National University and the Biennial Duguid Memorial Lecture series (held in alternate years at the University of South Australia and Flinders University).

== Early life and education ==
Duguid was born at Eglinton Street in Saltcoats, Ayrshire, the son of Charles Duguid, a teacher, and Jane Snodgrass Kinnier, daughter of Robert S. Kinnier, a surgeon, sister of Captain Douglas Reid Kinnier. He attended Ardrossan Academy, where his father was Headmaster between 1882 and 1889, and the High School in Glasgow, before studying medicine at the University of Glasgow, where he gained MA in 1905 and MBChB (Bachelor of Medicine and Bachelor of Surgery) in 1909.

=== Early career ===
After graduation, Duguid worked as a doctor in Glasgow, but in 1911 he signed on as ship's medical officer on a voyage to Australia and home again. He met his future wife, Irene Isabella Young, aboard, and they became engaged and decided to live in Australia.

Back in Scotland, he worked amongst the very poor in mining villages, before emigrating to Australia in 1912, working his passage as medical officer once more. He and Irene married in Melbourne on 23 October 1912, then moved to Minyip, a small town in the Wimmera region of Victoria, where they lived before moving to Adelaide in 1914.

In February 1917, during World War I, Duguid sailed for Egypt as a captain in the Royal Australian Army Medical Corps, as part of the First Australian Imperial Force. He first worked in the Middle East, treating casualties in the Australian Light Horse, and then on a hospital ship before leaving the service in October 1917. He wrote two books about his experiences, before returning to Scotland in 1919 for post-graduate study and to earn his surgical fellowship.

== Life and post-WWI career in Adelaide ==
Upon return from Scotland, Duguid bought a house at Magill, a suburb east of Adelaide. He set up a GP practice and also worked as a surgeon at the Memorial Hospital, North Adelaide. He also became an active member of local branches of several organisations doing charitable work for ex-servicemen and -women, the Returned Sailors’ and Soldiers’ Imperial League of Australia (RSL), Legacy Australia and Toc H.

The family, now with son Charles, moved to Britain for a while for Duguid to undertake further medical studies, but his first wife Irene died on the return journey.

In 1927 he met Phyllis Evelyn Lade, through his connection to her mother, when he was serving as councillor (1922-1934) and she an English teacher at Presbyterian Girls College. They married in 1930 at the Methodist Church in the inner Adelaide suburb of Kent Town.

Also in 1930, Duguid was elected a fellow of the Royal Australasian College of Surgeons.

He had two children, Andrew and Rosemary, with Phyllis.

In 1944, Phyllis fostered a six-year-old Aboriginal boy, Sydney James Cook, who had been enrolled at King's College, Adelaide. He lived with the family until 1950 when he was sent to Roper River in the Northern Territory in order to benefit by growing up in an Aboriginal community.

Duguid retired from his surgical and general medical practice in 1956, but later developed an interest in geriatric medicine.

== Aboriginal rights ==
The murder of a white man by Aboriginal people at Brooks Soak, in the former Territory of Central Australia (now the Northern Territory), leading to what became known as the Coniston massacre, when police shot between 31 and 200 Aboriginal people in punitive raids in 1928, sparked Duguid's interest in Aboriginal rights.

In 1934 he headed to Darwin, but missed his connection from Alice Springs after responding to a request to perform some emergency surgery there and stayed on for three weeks. He was appalled at the way Aboriginal people were treated there and by their poor living conditions. He visited Pastor Friedrich Albrecht and met Albert Namatjira, with whom he became friends, at Hermannsburg Mission.

In 1937, Duguid helped to found Ernabella Mission in the Musgrave Ranges of South Australia. He lectured and spoke in the United Kingdom as well as Australia and New Zealand about the conditions of the Australian Aboriginal people.

Duguid was active in several organisations concerned with the advancement of Aboriginal rights, such as the Victorian Council for Aboriginal Rights (CAR), which was founded at a meeting in Melbourne on 16 March 1951, addressed by Duguid, and also the Association for the Protection of Native Races, relating to the Northern Territory. He was also involved with the Anti-Slavery Society, which in 1909 merged with the Aborigines' Protection Society. In addition to these, he had some involvement with the organisations described below. He and his wife Phyllis led much of the work to improve the status of Aboriginal people in South Australia during the mid-twentieth century.

=== Aborigines Protection Board ===
Duguid was appointed a founding member of the South Australian Government's Aborigines Protection Board in 1940, after the Aborigines Act Amendment Act 1939 created this entity, which was "charged with the duty of controlling and promoting the welfare" of Aboriginal people (which included anyone descended from an Aboriginal person). "It replaced the office of the Chief Protector of Aborigines and the Advisory Council of Aborigines, and took over the role of legal guardianship of all Aboriginal children". Other board members included J. B. Cleland and Constance Cooke. As part of his duties, Duguid inspected Aboriginal reserves throughout the State, noting abuses against Aboriginal people on pastoral properties and discrimination in education. He and Phyllis, with their two children and their fostered Aboriginal son, Sydney James Cook, visited Ernabella in 1946.

Soon afterwards they heard of the British proposal to test guided weapons over South Australia from a base to be built at Woomera in the Central Australian Desert. Concerned about the impact of the rocket range on the inhabitants of the Central Australian reserves, Duguid criticised the scheme at public meetings in Adelaide and, with Donald Thomson, in Melbourne led the 1947 campaign against the rocket-testing program. He worked hard to inform the public of the harmful effect that this program would have on those people still living traditionally nearby. Duguid resigned from the Aborigines Protection Board when it approved the proposal, but as a result of the protests a patrol officer, Walter MacDougall, was appointed at Woomera. His resignation made world headlines.

The Aborigines Protection Board promoted assimilation, but by the 1950s, human rights ideas had changed, and in 1963 the Aboriginal Affairs Advisory Board, which focused on attaining full citizenship, was created as a replacement body.

=== Aborigines' Protection League ===
In 1925, Joseph Charles Genders, a wealthy accountant and publisher, proposed the idea of a "Model Aboriginal State" in Northern Territory, and formed the Aborigines' Protection League to give support to his idea after failing to garner support from the Aborigines' Friends' Association. His idea was sparked by his dismay at seeing the poor conditions in which Aboriginal people lived at Point McLeay, a small community south of Adelaide not far from the mouth of the River Murray. He garnered some support and submitted a petition to Prime Minister Stanley Melbourne Bruce, who delegated an investigation by Queensland's Protector of Aboriginals, John William Bleakley. Bleakley rejected the proposal, supporting instead the establishment of an Aboriginal reserve in Arnhem Land, in the north-eastern corner of the Northern Territory. By the early 1930s, few supported the Aboriginal State proposal, and in 1935 Duguid was elected president of the League, remaining in the position until 1946.

The League under Duguid's leadership continued to emphasise the ability and rights of Aboriginal people to govern themselves and retain their culture, and it was during this time that he established Ernabella mission on the edge of the Central Aborigines Reserve. The mission stressed respect for Indigenous culture, and the League supported it through the 1930s. However, by 1939, the League's original members had reduced in number, mostly due to old age and death, and Duguid and honorary secretary E.R. Edwards carried on alone. Despite a surge of support at a meeting in Adelaide Town Hall after their return from a visit to the mission, resulting in new members, World War II intervened as a higher priority.

=== Aborigines' Advancement League of South Australia ===
In 1938, Sydney activists Jack Patten and others were staging protests in Sydney. In Adelaide, a group of non-Aboriginal women representing other organisations, initiated and presided over by Phyllis Duguid, formed a new association, the League for the Protection and Advancement of Aboriginal and Half-caste Women. When the Aborigines' Protection League disbanded in 1946, it donated its remaining funds to the women's organisation, which then opened membership to men and became known as the Aborigines' Advancement League of South Australia (AALSA), or possibly just Aborigines' Advancement League (AAL), in 1950. Duguid was president from 1951 to 1961 (and Phyllis held this role from 1966 to 1971). Under his presidency the AALSA became a platform for Aboriginal voices. People like Lowitja O'Donoghue and other former Colebrook Home residents joined the League in the early 1950s, to fight for entry into professions such as teaching and nursing for the women, and apprenticeships for the men. O'Donoghue, Grace Lester, Muriel Brumbie, and Faith Coulthard had all applied to train as nurses at the Royal Adelaide Hospital and been turned down. Duguid was outraged, and this and the need for a hostel to house Aboriginal people in the city drove the public meeting which he arranged in the Adelaide Town Hall on 31 August 1953, which was addressed by five Aboriginal people (George Rankin, Mona Paul, Peter Tilmouth, Ivy Mitchell, and Geoff Barnes) speaking of their personal experiences of discrimination. The meeting resulted in a great increase in membership of the League and a big boost in funds for the hostel.

AALSA, led by the Duguids, was responsible organising a petition to change the SA Police Offences Act 1953, resulting in a repeal of the "consorting clause", which made it an offence for a non-Aboriginal person to "habitually consort" with an Aboriginal person, in 1958.

In the wake of the 1967 referendum, Aboriginal people increasingly took control of their own affairs. In Victoria, non-Aboriginal members of the Victorian Aborigines Advancement League had to resign in 1969. A 1974 seminar run by the AALSA on the question "Do Aborigines need White help?" produced a range of views. In 1998, the AALSA Committee said in the newsletter that the society, dating back to the time of Duguid, had always had a strong commitment to education and human rights for Aboriginal people, and that it would continue in this tradition, focusing on land rights, language maintenance and for recognition and respect for Aboriginal culture as a "vital component of Australian society".

The organisation continued until 2008. According to the Trove catalogue entry for the State Library of South Australia (SLSA) holdings, "The original 1949 constitution named the League as 'Aborigines Advancement League'. A new constitution was drafted in the 1990s and the name was changed to 'Aboriginal Advancement League' ".

Minutes of the Aborigines Advancement League from 1950 to 2008 exist in the SLSA, and there is a typescript entitled History of the Aborigines Advancement League of South Australia by Phyllis Duguid, dated 1969. The AALSA published a Newsletter from 1959 to at least 1978; from 1997 to 2008, the publication was given the name Advancement.

==== Note about names ====
The Libraries Australia authority record for the organisation gives this information: "Formed in 1953, the Aborigines Advancement League of South Australia (also known as the Aborigines Advancement League Inc. S.A. and often referred to as the Aboriginal Advancement League of South Australia) was deregistered as a company in 1995. It was revived by 1998 as the Aborigines Advancement League South Australia, which by 2001 had changed its name to Aboriginal Advancement League South Australia which was incorporated on 15 Apr. 2002.".

==== Wiltja ====
One outcome of the meeting in the Town Hall was the establishment of the Wiltja Hostel in November 1956, at 17 East Avenue in the Adelaide suburb of Millswood. (Wiltja is a Pitjantjatjara word for a type of open shelter, built for protection from the sun.) Also known as the Aborigines Advancement League Hostel and the Millswood Girls' Home, it provided accommodation for Aboriginal girls who were attending secondary school in Adelaide, and often for a year beyond school, until 1978. From 1978 to 1980 it became a boarding house for adult Aboriginal visitors to the city, after which it was leased to and later purchase by the Education Department.

In 1980, the first Wiltja students attended Ingle Farm High School. In 1990 they moved to Woodville High School, accommodated in various hostels around Adelaide. In 1997, Wiltja Boarding was set up in Northgate, and in 2010, the first Wiltja students began studying at Windsor Gardens Vocational College, which included a transition programme for the students. In 2020, the college became Avenues College, located on the same site but amalgamated with Gilles Plains Primary School and Children's Centre.

=== Federal Council for Aboriginal Advancement ===
On 14 February 1958, a three-day conference began in Willard Hall, in Wakefield Street, Adelaide, attended by 12 delegates from nine Aboriginal rights and welfare leagues and 12 observers, hosted by the AALSA. The meeting culminated in the foundation of the Federal Council for Aboriginal Advancement, designed to unite existing lobby groups, with a goal to help "the Aboriginal people of Australia to become self-reliant, self-supporting members of the community". This was the first national body representing Aboriginal interests. Duguid, one of the oldest members and then president of AALSA, was elected as the first president. Only groups which had "earned themselves the right to be considered seriously as organisations fighting on behalf of Aborigines" and some newer groups which had proven worthy were invited. Different lobby groups focused on different aspects of Aboriginal welfare or rights and members varied in composition, but they all desired to effect change. It was hard to measure success, but all contributed to changing public opinion to an acceptance that Aboriginal people deserved rights.

It was a significant milestone to bring together the disparate groups under an umbrella organisation; however, AALSA sought to disaffiliate from about 1959, achieving this in 1966, because it thought the federal organisation too focused on the state of Victoria. So most of the work continued to be undertaken by South Australian groups, many of them led by the Duguids.

=== Aborigines Progress Association ===
The Aborigines Progress Association (APA) was a breakaway group from AALSA, assisted in its formation by Laurie Bryan, a non-Aboriginal man who wanted to form an "all-Aboriginal" group, in 1964. Malcolm Cooper was a founding member, along with his wife Aileen, and also became president, while co-founder John Moriarty became vice-president of the organisation. Other founding members were Winnie Branson and her brother Vince Copley. Most of the Aboriginal members of the AALSA left to join the APA. O'Donaghue reported that she and others, including Gladys Elphick, joined the new group because they felt the need for an all-Aboriginal group, but without any ill-feeling towards the League or Duguid.

Other members included Aileen Cooper's sister Nancy Brumby and several of her sisters and female friends, and other family friends. APA had a temporary government home as a base for meetings at Taperoo. Cooper's male friends who joined included former residents of St Francis House, including Gordon Briscoe, Charlie Perkins, Jerry Hill, and many others. The APA established the Aboriginal Education Foundation, which helped to support Aboriginal students through secondary school and tertiary education, including Lois O'Donoghue, Margaret Lawrie and Maude Tongerie, who also engaged in political activism.

The group broke up in the 1970s, its members helping to establish the Aboriginal Cultural Centre.

=== Council of Aboriginal Women of South Australia ===
In 1966, after Elphick clashed with Laurie Bryan and others became disillusioned with the Progress Association (which they said was run mainly by white people), she and a group of Aboriginal women broke away and formed the Council of Aboriginal Women of South Australia(CAWSA). Maude Tongerie was a co-founder, and some of the other "Colebrook girls", including Lowitja O'Donoghue and Faith Coulthard, and Ruby Hammond from the Coorong, were actively involved with the Council. CAWSA worked closely with and received substantial support from the Department of Aboriginal Affairs. Working out of an office in Pirie Street, Adelaide, they did a lot of work to support Aboriginal women and children, running programs such as the Sunday Mail blanket drive and organising a Christmas tree in Bonython Park each year. After the disbandment of the APA, the Aboriginal Cultural Centre amalgamated with CAWSA, with Elphick as first president of the ACC, which still continues as Numkuwarrin Yunti of South Australia.

== Other activities ==
Duguid helped to found the Australian branch of the English-Speaking Union, and was chairman from 1932 to 1935.

In 1935, he was elected first lay Moderator of the Presbyterian Church of South Australia.

In December 1935, the Duguids hosted 34 children over 6 weeks from the Colebrook Home in Quorn, at their home.

From 1943 Duguid was a member, along with K. S. Isles, G. V. Portus and others, of Common Cause, a think tank contemplating the shape of a post-war society. He acted as president from c.1946–1948.

From 1944 to 1960, he was president of the District and Bush Nursing Society of South Australia.

In 1948, he helped care for the sick during a measles epidemic at Ernabella in 1948.

He was also involved in some way with the following organisations at different times:

- Australian Student Christian Movement
- United Nations Association of Australia
- National Union of Australian University Students
- Australian Inland Mission
- Royal Flying Doctor Service
- Alice Springs Army Native Labour Unit
- Fullarton Girls Home (run by the Salvation Army)

== Death, honours, legacy ==
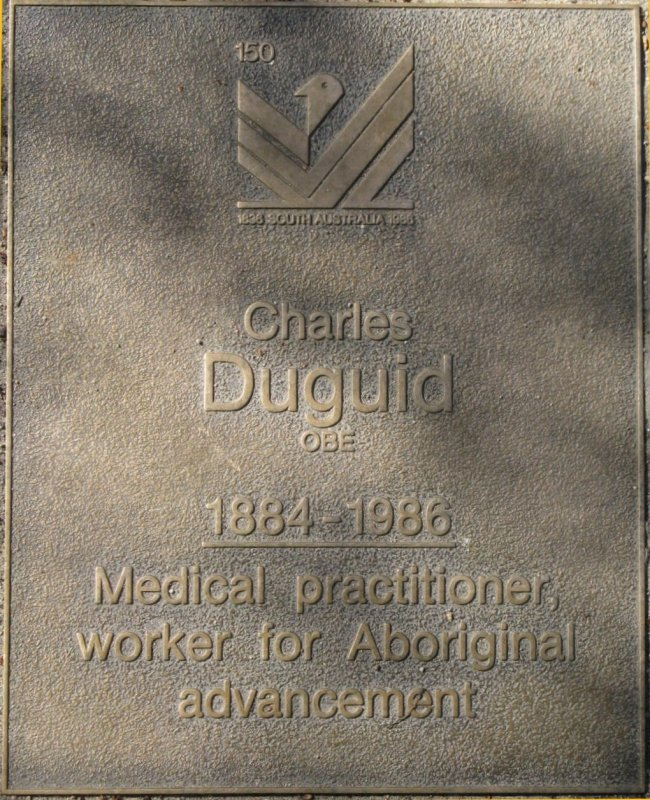
Jubilee 150 Walkway Plaque commemorating Charles Duguid

In April 1984, on his 100th birthday, the Ernabella choir made a special trip to come and sing for him in Adelaide.

Duguid died on 5 December 1986 at Kent Town, Adelaide, at the age of 102. He was buried at Ernabella.

A plaque honouring Duguid was laid in the Jubilee 150 Walkway in North Terrace, Adelaide.

=== Awards ===
- In 1971, Duguid was awarded the OBE for his work with Aboriginal people.
- In 1972, he received a letter from the people at Ernabella requesting that after his death, his body be buried at the mission, so that they would "always remember that he was one of us and that he faithfully helped us". He considered this his greatest honour. The Pitjantjatjara people gave him the name Tjilpi, meaning "respected old man".
- In 1974 he received the Anisfield-Wolf Book Award, an American award honouring written works that make important contributions to the understanding of racism, for his autobiography Doctor and the Aborigines.

=== Legacy ===
- His thinking influenced the thinking of two state premiers, Don Dunstan and David Tonkin, eventually leading to the unprecedented return to the Pitjantjatjara people of some of their ancient tribal lands, with the creation of Aṉangu Pitjantjatjara Yankunytjatjara (APY lands) in 1981.
- The Duguid Indigenous Endowment Fund was created at the Australian National University by Rosemary and Bob Douglas (the Duguids' daughter and son-in-law) and Dr Andrew Duguid (their son).
- The Duguid Travelling Scholarship is enabled by an endowment made in 2002 to the ANU's Endowment for Excellence by Andrew Duguid and Rosemary Douglas in recognition of their parents' contribution.
- In 1994, the AALSA made a large donation to the University of South Australia and Flinders University, to provide study grants for Aboriginal graduates and to conduct a memorial lecture every two years. The Biennial Duguid Memorial Lecture (held alternate years at the University of South Australia and Flinders University) is held in honour of Charles and Phyllis Duguid.

== List of works ==
- Duguid, Charles (1917), From the Suez Canal to Gaza with the Australian Light Horse, W.K. Thomas Co
- Duguid, Charles; Australia. Department of Repatriation (1919), The desert trail : with the light horse through Sinai to Palestine (4th ed.), W. K. Thomas
- Duguid, Charles (1939), Ernabella mission, July-August, 1939, C. Duguid
- Duguid, Charles (1939), Ernabella : the medical patrol, 1939, Presbyterian Board of Missions
- Duguid, Charles (1946). Ernabella re-visited : the diary of a pilgrimage. Australian Presbyterian Board of Missions.
- Duguid, Charles (1951), The aborigines of Darwin and the tropic north, [Duguid]
- Duguid, Charles (1957), Macewen of Glasgow : a recollection of the chief, Oliver and Boyd (about Scottish neurosurgeon William Macewen)
- Duguid, Charles (1963). No Dying Race. Rigby, Adelaide.
- Duguid, Charles (1972). Doctor and the Aborigines. Rigby, Adelaide. (ebook available here)
- Duguid, Charles (1977), Doctor goes walkabout, Rigby, ISBN 978-0-7270-0290-7
- Duguid, Charles (1978), Tribal nomadic people [the founding of Ernabella]

== Interview transcripts and recordings ==
- Duguid, Charles (1931), Violet Day, Adelaide, 1931 : memorial address, s.n.]
- Duguid, Charles; Australian Presbyterian Board of Missions. Aborigines Department (1941), The future of the Aborigines of Australia : address to the Missionary Council of Australia (South Australian Branch) November 16, 1941, Issued by Presbyterian Church of Australia, Board of Missions, Aborigines Department
- Duguid, Charles; Australian Broadcasting Commission. South Australian Branch (1946), The Aborigines of Australia : broadcasts and an address (2nd ed.), Reliance Printing Company
- Duguid, Charles (1947), Aborigines' Sunday : A.B.C. Guest of Honour Talk, 2nd February 1947, [Australian Broadcasting Commission]
- Duguid, Charles; Anti-slavery Society (Great Britain) (1954), The Aborigines of Australia : an address by Dr. Charles Duguid to the Annual Meeting of the Anti-Slavery Society on the 15th June 1954, Anti-Slavery Society
- Duguid, Charles (1973), "Radio interview with Dr. Charles Duguid" (Audio + transcript) (Interview), interviewed by Robertson, Janet
- Duguid, Charles (1981), "Interview with Charles Duguid" (Audio) (Interview), interviewed by Robertson, Beth M.

== Photographs ==
- Duguid, Charles (1930), Charles Duguid collection of photographs of Aboriginal Australians at Ernabella Mission and other locations, ca. 1930-1950 66 photographs available for online perusal, here

== See also ==
- Australian outback literature of the 20th century
