= Aboriginal Legal Rights Movement =

Indigenous Australian legal service in South Australia

The Aboriginal Legal Rights Movement (ALRM) is an ATSILS (Aboriginal and Torres Strait Islander Legal Services centre) in South Australia, providing pro bono legal services to Aboriginal and Torres Strait Islander peoples in the state.

== History ==
ALRM was established in 1972, after a number of Aboriginal and Torres Strait Islander elders got together with the aim of developing specific legal services for Indigenous Australians, who were being poorly treated by the criminal justice system, including experiencing police brutality. They also advocated for land rights and campaigned against racial discrimination. The Aboriginal Community Centre Inc. and the Council of Aboriginal Women of South Australia, including Winnie Branson and Gladys Elphick, were instrumental in the founding, and the ALRM was incorporated in 1973, receiving A$$22,000 in Commonwealth government funding via the Department of Aboriginal Affairs.

In 2017, ALRM became a company limited by guarantee, which provides the opportunity to diversify its business and possibly become more self-supporting.

In 2012, Narungga woman Cheryl Axleby was appointed CEO of the organisation. She continued in this role until 2020, with Chris Larkin assuming the position in the new financial year.

=== Custody Notification Service ===
On 1 July 2020, the Attorney-General of South Australia, Vickie Chapman, announced that the state government would implement a formal Custody Notification Service (CNS), after Aboriginal Affairs Labor spokesperson Kyam Maher had written to Premier Steven Marshall in June saying that he would introduce a Bill to parliament to legally mandate the service. This would legally require SAPOL to notify the ALRM when an Aboriginal person enters custody. This had been done informally for some time, but the legal requirement would "help to ensure Aboriginal people receive culturally appropriate well-being support and basic legal advice as soon as possible after being taken into custody". Mandating the measure would also mean that if an officer refuses or fails to comply, they "may be subject to disciplinary proceedings" under the Police Complaints and Discipline Act 2016. The move was welcomed by ALRM, which had been lobbying for it for years. The Summary Offences (Custody Notification Service) Variation Regulations 2020 was gazetted on 2 July 2020.

== Location and description ==
Its headquarters are in Adelaide, with branch offices in Ceduna, Port Augusta and Port Lincoln. It an independent organisation governed by a board of all Aboriginal Australians, which also acts as a lobby group to advocate for justice for Aboriginal people as well as providing programs which aim to address issues which raise the likelihood of Aboriginal people encountering the criminal justice system.

The motto of the organisation is "Justice Without Prejudice", with its vision stated as "To pursue social justice, equality, and wellbeing for the Aboriginal peoples of South Australia, especially for those Aboriginal people who are detained in police custody or imprisoned". To this end, representatives of ALRM sit on various committees and liaise with government departments and others, including the Department for Correctional Services and South Australia Police and the Attorney General's Department. They try to explain the impact of various laws on Aboriginal people, and the cultural differences compared with non-Indigenous people. The 2020 Black Lives Matter movement in the US once again cast light on Aboriginal deaths in custody, an issue pursued by ALRM. Former CEO Axleby said that she would like to see a huge reduction in the numbers of Indigenous people in the justice system and the numbers of children being removed from their families under child protection policies implemented by Families SA.

== Governance and funding ==
ALRM is governed by a board, which appoints the CEO and executive management. As of 2023, Chris Larkin is CEO.

ALRM was funded by the federal government, the Attorney-General of South Australia, the federal Attorney-General's Department, the SA Department of the Premier and Cabinet and other government departments. Private sponsors include the Commonwealth Bank and the Wyatt Trust. During the financial year 2019-2020, there was a transition in the source of funding, from the Commonwealth Government via the Indigenous Legal Assistance Program (ILAP), to the National Legal Assistance Partnership (NLAP). (Note: ILAP formerly funded all Aboriginal & Torres Strait Islander legal services across the country, including its the National Aboriginal and Torres Strait Islander Legal Services.) The SA Attorney-General's Department is responsible for distributing NLAP funding, which began its new relationship with ALRM on 1 July 2020.

As of May 2022, ALRM was receiving around A$33 million over five years from NLAP funding, of which around 80 per cent was used to pay 30 lawyers employed across the state. However ALRM salaries were not keeping pace with similar legal aid organisations, and it was difficult to attract lawyers willing to live in regional areas, so it had to pay travel expenses for staff living in the city. In addition, there was a huge backlog of cases, and current staff were overloaded. The chief legal officer of ALRM asked the state government provide additional funding to the organisation.

As of January 2021 there were 60 staff members employed across ALRM, and its network of regional offices enable it to support people living in the remote APY Lands as well as elsewhere in South Australia. It represents 21 major language groups across the state.
