= National Aboriginal Conference =

Former Australian governmental body

The National Aboriginal Conference (NAC) was a national organisation established by the Australian Government to represent Indigenous Australians, that is Aboriginal Australians and Torres Strait Islander peoples.

The NAC was originally established as the National Aboriginal Consultative Committee (NACC) in 1973 by the Whitlam government with a principal function to advise the Department of Aboriginal Affairs and the Minister on issues of concern to Indigenous peoples. Its members were elected by Indigenous people. The reorganisation of the Committee into the National Aboriginal Conference did little to fundamentally alter the characteristics of the original Committee: The Conference's members too were selected by Indigenous peoples, and it remained in an advisory role.

Although Indigenous leaders desired the Conference (and previously the Committee) to take on a greater and more direct role in the creation of policy, the organisation maintained an advisory role over the course of its existence. However, these leaders found political leverage in the Conference. They utilised this leverage, and through actions on the international stage and in domestic media campaigns, the Conference was able to exert pressure on the Governments of the day to adopt a more involved approach to Aboriginal affairs.

The Conference is known for its recommendation of a form of treaty between Aboriginal peoples and the Australian Government, using the Yolngu word makarrata to describe this.

Relations between the Conference and the Commonwealth Government progressively deteriorated over the course of its life, and the Conference was eventually abolished by the Hawke government in 1985.

== History ==
=== Founding and early history ===
The National Aboriginal Consultative Committee (NACC) was established by the Whitlam government in 1973 and this later morphed into the National Aboriginal Conference. The Consultative Committee had an original purpose to provide the Commonwealth Government with advice on issues pertaining to Aboriginal people. However, this purpose did not align with the expectations of Aboriginal leaders who sought self-determination and a representative body which would provide the mechanisms for this self-determination.

The first meeting of the Committee occurred in December 1973. Subsequently, one of the first tasks conducted by the Committee was the creation of the Committee's constitution. The proposal enumerated powers and functions of the Committee which were aligned with the conception of an autonomous body held by Aboriginal leaders, but this proposal was rejected by the Whitlam government. This drafting process also included the proposal to retitle the Committee as the 'National Aboriginal Congress'. This proposal too was rejected by the Whitlam government. However, the Committee defied the rejection of the Whitlam government and operated colloquially under the 'National Aboriginal Congress' name.

=== Restructuring: NAC ===
By 1976, as frustrations grew in Aboriginal communities with the absence of a true representative institution and the effectiveness of the National Aboriginal Consultative Committee in advancing the interests of Aboriginal people, the Federal Executive Council acknowledged these concerns. The new Minister for Aboriginal Affairs in the Fraser government, Ian Viner, in an address to the Committee, spoke of the "frustrations you as members suffer in trying to achieve an impossible task".

Viner and his Department later in 1976, established and inquiry to examine the perceived failings of the NACC and the relationship between the NACC and the government, in terms of funding and other forms of support. The response to this inquiry was the restructuring of the NACC into the National Aboriginal Conference (NAC). Lowitja O'Donoghue was appointed founding chairperson of the NAC in 1977.

However, the restructuring of the organisation did not provide the mechanisms for self-determination sought by Aboriginal leaders as, like its predecessor, the Conference had no direct policy-making or law-making power. The newly reorganised Conference initially operated in the same limited advisory role of its predecessor. However, a string of actions on the international stage, including through the dispatch of a delegation to the United Nations in 1976, increased the domestic influence of the Conference. These international actions were considered "an embarrassment" for the Commonwealth Government and prompted the government to seek meetings with NAC members.

=== Treaty and makarrata ===
In April 1979, in a resolution which again litigated many of the issues in Coe v Commonwealth, the NAC expressed support for a Treaty between non-Aboriginal and Aboriginal peoples. The NAC embraced the word makarrata, a Yolngu word meaning "the end of a dispute between communities and the resumption of normal relations", as they understood the probability that the Australian public and the government would reject the proposal of a 'treaty' in the conventional sense. In November 1979, the NAC established a sub-committee on the makarrata which proceeded to travel the country and consult with Indigenous peoples. The committee issued a report the following year.

The Fraser government plainly rejected a treaty as it believed that doing so may reinforce the view embraced by many Indigenous people "that a treaty should be negotiated with an Indigenous nation". However, the Fraser government was receptive to the proposed makarrata. Consequently, in late 1981, the Senate Standing Committee on Constitutional and Legal Affairs began an investigation of the feasibility of a treaty or makarrata as proposed by the NAC. Despite a number of concerns about the integrity of this investigation being expressed by Indigenous leaders, the Committee eventually delivered a report on the issues raised in 1983.

== Decline ==
At the end of the Fraser government in 1983, there was a distinct sense among the upper echelons of the NAC staff that the organisation's future was in doubt. At this time, the NAC had been starved of resources, both in terms of finances and personnel. However, there were other problems pervading the NAC at the end of the Fraser government.

The newly elected Hawke government though initially reversed course in its relations with the NAC. The new Minister for Aboriginal Affairs, Clyde Holding, actively encouraged reform of the NAC and provided the resources and opportunities for this reform to take place. Holding positioned the NAC as the principal advisory body to his department and gave the NAC a direct role in the formulation of policy, including on national land rights legislation.

The NAC executive was however, divided on the question of reform. There was a pro-reform faction among the members headed by Rob Riley who sought to morph the NAC into a lobbying instrument by strengthening ties to grass roots groups and developing policy proposals with these groups. The other faction headed by Ray Robinson believed that the NAC needed resources not reform; they accepted the advisory position and directed their attention to interaction with government rather than Aboriginals themselves.

This division led to lassitude in implementing reform which frustrated Holding, who grew impatient with the NAC due to its inability to see its weaknesses. Holding then ended the self-reformation process in September 1983. He appointed an independent investigator to examine the NAC and report on how it might be reorganised.

In the following year, a number of key figures resigned from the NAC including Rob Riley and the NAC chairman. Furthermore, a degree of financial mismanagement was exposed. These financial troubles were the product of inexperienced staff. This strained the NAC's relationship with Holding and led him to place the NAC into the receivership of the Department of Aboriginal Affairs. Finally, in 1985, the report commissioned by Holding recommended the abolition of the NAC in its entirety. Tumultuous protests against Holding's land rights policies ensued in the first half of 1985 and eventually, in June, heralded the abolition of the NAC.

== Achievements and legacy ==
The limitations on the powers of the NAC to implement policy did not limit its capacity to operate as a political actor. For example, the NAC's call for a treaty in the form of the makarrata in 1979 was significant in catalysing and directing the nature of Indigenous protest over the course of the decade which followed.

The nature of the makarrata being such that it was a treaty between an Indigenous state and the Australian state, served to catalyse a period of Indigenous separatism. Independent Indigenous activists extended the original conception of the makarrata and explored the character and nature of Indigenous sovereignty.

== Notable people ==
=== Jim Hagan ===
Jim Hagan was elected to the NAC in 1977 after he moved to Toowoomba. He was most notable for his service as the chairman of the NAC, a position to which he was elected in 1980. In this position, he oversaw the NAC and its sub-committees at the time when it delivered the report on the makarrata.

Hagan was also notable for being the first Aboriginal Australian to address the United Nations. As chairman of the NAC, he led a delegation of NAC members to address the human rights committee of the UN on the Noonkanbah dispute concerning the granting of mining rights to land considered to be sacred Aboriginal land. This appearance at the UN garnered international media coverage and drew attention to the issue of Indigenous land rights in Australia.

After the dissolution of the NAC by the Hawke government, Hagan took a position with the Aboriginal Development Commission and continued with the Commission through its restructurings until his retirement in 1997.

=== Rob Riley ===
Rob Riley was elected to the Conference in 1981 and became the Conference's national chair in May 1984.

During his time at the Conference, before he was elected national chair, he was crucial in helping shape the response of Indigenous representative groups to the issue of land rights and their allocation.

A key initiative championed by Riley in the latter half of 1983 was the creation of a network of Indigenous activist and representative groups with the NAC, in an effort to strengthen the voice and influence of the Conference. One significant result of these efforts was the signing of a formal agreement in October 1983 between the executive of the NAC and the National Federation of Land Councils for cooperation in the pursuit of Aboriginal land rights.

Throughout his tenure as National Chair of the Conference, Riley exercised political pressure on the government by maintaining a relationship with the media and utilising this relationship to communicate information regarding his and the Conference's agenda. Furthermore, in the course of his and the NAC's direct relationship with the Government, Riley did not refrain from maintaining an adversarial posture. He was outspoken and carried himself with an irreverence for the trappings of power. For example, soon after his election to National Chair, in October 1984, Riley was invited to attend the National Press Club and address the gathered media but used this opportunity to launch a direct criticism of the then-Prime Minister Bob Hawke for his handling of the land rights issue.

One of Riley's first significant acts during his tenure as the National Chair was his playing a substantial role in the development of the Aboriginal and Torres Strait Islander Heritage Bill. He was involved in the framing of the Bill and its political purposes. True to the decisive and consequential frame which he placed the NAC in, Riley opted to lobby the Opposition leader to acquire the Opposition's support in the passage of the Bill, rather than issuing statements of advice to the Government.

The end of Riley's leadership as National Chair of the Conference was arguably the product of the contrast in leadership styles between Riley and the Minister Responsible for overseeing the Conference, Clyde Holding. Riley led the Conference with his convictions embedded in his leadership style. Conversely, Holding was a political realist and operated by placing the interests of his Party and their electoral success first. Riley's outspoken leadership style became intolerable for Holding in late 1984 when Riley became a vocal critic of a Government deal with the Western Australian Premier Brian Burke which would, as a consequence, significantly reduce a previously sizeable commitment to delivering Indigenous land rights.

== See also ==
- Aboriginal Development Commission
