= Annesley Junior School =

Location
- Wayville, South Australia; Australia; 34°56′31.37″S 138°35′54.22″E

Information
- Type: Independent, day, primary school, early learning centre (long daycare centre / child care centre / pre-school)
- Mottoes: Dare to Become
- Denomination: Uniting Church
- Established: 1902
- Key people: Bruce Spangler (Chair); Jo Rossiter (Principal)
- Enrolment: 248
- Colours: Maroon, navy and white
- Website: www.annesley.sa.edu.au

Annesley Junior School, formerly known as Methodist Ladies' College and Annesley College, is an independent day school for girls and boys from two years old to year 6. It is located in Wayville, a suburb of Adelaide, South Australia. It has a co-educational early learning centre for children between the ages of two and five, and a primary school for reception to year 6. It is affiliated with the Association of Independent Schools of South Australia, and the Junior School Heads Association of Australia (JSHAA).

Founded as Methodist Ladies' College in 1902 and later changing its name to Annesley College, it used to be a girls' school catering for students from Reception to Year 12. Annesley has been an International Baccalaureate World School since December 2005.

== Campus and curriculum ==
Annesley Junior School is located on a single campus in Wayville, opposite the Adelaide Parklands, 500 metres from the Adelaide CBD. Notable facilities include the historic 'Gillingham Hall' seating the whole school and a Chapel.

Annesley Junior School's academic programs include the Primary Years Program of the International Baccalaureate (IBPYP).

Intakes to the Early Learning Centre and Reception are in January and July. Older children are able to enter throughout the year subject to places being available.

== History ==
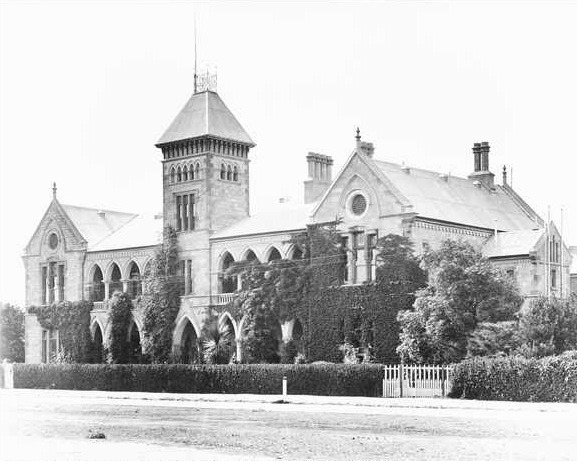
Methodist Ladies' College, 1903

Annesley Junior School was founded in 1902 as Methodist Ladies' College (MLC), at the site of the former Malvern Grammar School, with 26 students enrolled. In 1903, the school was moved to the site of the former Way College for boys on Park Terrace (now Greenhill Road) at Wayville.

In 1977, a Union of the Congregational, Methodist and Presbyterian Churches took place, forming the Uniting Church in Australia. MLC subsequently took the name Annesley College, the maiden name of Susanna Wesley, the mother of John Wesley, the founder of the Methodist Church.

=== 2010–2012: Merger talks, council resignation, transition to Junior School ===
In October 2010 Annesley College considered merging with another school due to declining enrolments over the previous seven years. The Uniting Church stated it would guarantee the continuity of the school for the following two years and that no merger would proceed. The school appointed former Melbourne Girls Grammar School principal Christine Briggs as its new principal but she withdrew from the appointment days later.

In the face of growing uncertainty the school said it was seeking formal discussion with Pulteney Grammar School regarding a merger, but the Uniting Church shortly thereafter withdrew in favour of "the co-operation of another Uniting Church School". It subsequently stated that Scotch College would take over its management. The existing school council resigned, stating that amalgamation would have provided a better outcome.

By January 2011, 108 students remained enrolled, down from 466 students mid-2010, and by June 2011 the school announced it would relaunch in 2012 as the Annesley Learning Community, offering a school for boys and girls from Reception to Year 6 (from 2012) and a women's college for Years 10 to 12 (from 2013), with a commensurate drop in staff numbers from 29 to 13. Year 10 to 12 tuition was not sustained and the college was renamed Annesley Junior School. In August 2012 there were 100 students enrolled.

== Notable alumnae ==
Annesley has an Old Scholars Association which began in 1905 as the MLC Guild. The first meetings were literary and music evenings with girls writing essays for discussion. Some notable Annesley/MLC Old Scholars include:

- Simone Annan – R&B singer with a degree in biomedical science
- Kate Box – actress
- Roxy Byrne (née Sims) – actress and hockey player (Head Prefect, Dux and Captain of Hockey; Class of 1929)
- Mary Campbell (Mollie) Dawbarn (1902–1982) – biochemist and nutritional physiologist
- Sara Douglass – author
- Phyllis Duguid OAM (1904–1993) née Lade – English teacher and Aboriginal rights and women's activist
- Amy Gillett – rower and cyclist
- Sally Newmarch – Olympic rower
- Jesse Scales – dancer
- Jessica Trengove – Australian representative to the 2012 and 2016 Olympics in Athletics
- Sesca Ross Zelling, OBE, LLB (1918–2001) – lawyer, vice-president of the NCW of Australia (1954–1957)

== See also ==
- List of schools in South Australia
