= Colebrook Home =

South Australian home for Aboriginal children

Colebrook Home was a South Australian institution for Australian Aboriginal children run by the United Aborigines Mission from 1924 to 1981. Originally established as Oodnadatta Children's Home, the home existed at four locations over its lifetime: Oodnadatta, Quorn, and then the Adelaide suburbs of Eden Hills and Blackwood. The Colebrook Reconciliation Park in Eden Hills commemorates the home and the people who lived in its various locations.

== History ==
Colebrook Home existed at four locations through its lifetime.

The United Aborigines Mission (UAM) first established a home in 1924 near Oodnadatta as Oodnadatta Children's Home, with Annie Lock as supervisor. The first building was a small iron shed, but a school, church, and a children's residential cottage were built. Ruby May Hyde, Iris Mina Harris, and a Miss Smith also cared for the children there, who numbered up to twelve children over three years.

The home then moved to just outside Quorn in 1927, where it became known as Colebrook Home, named after the president of the UAM, Thomas Colebrook. Here it was staffed by Matron Ruby Hyde and Sister Delia Rutter. Quorn residents held working bees to improve the facilities, and the children (who included Lowitja O'Donoghue) attended the local state school.

Adelaide businessman and philanthropist A. E. Gerard (1877–1950), who was involved with the foundation of Colebrook, wrote about its early days in his publication History of the UAM (1945).

In 1944 it was moved to a site on Shepherd's Hill Road, Eden Hills, just outside Adelaide. The children were not allowed to enrol at local schools (Blackwood Primary and Secondary Schools) until 1953, at which time the UAM organisation was in some turmoil. This was upsetting for the children, especially after Hyde and Rutter, who were loved by the children, retired in 1952 and several changes of staff followed. Hyde and Rutter were both later awarded MBEs for their devotion.

That site, which had fallen into disrepair by the mid-1950s, was taken on by the Finck family in 1957, at which time there were around 32 children there. It closed in 1972, and later demolished. It is now the site of the Colebrook Reconciliation Park, which features two statues created by South Australian artist Silvio Apponyi: Fountain of Tears (1998)and Grieving Mother (1999).

Its last location, which housed only a few remaining children, was in Blackwood, a hills suburb of Adelaide. The Department of Community Welfare took responsibility for the home at this location. The home was closed in 1981.

== Legacy ==
The original Colebrook at Quorn is now a small Aboriginal community.

Colebrook Home was mentioned in the Bringing Them Home Report (1997) as an institution that housed Indigenous children forcibly removed from their families.

== Former residents ==
Many former of Colebrook Home went on to have successful lives and some were high achievers.

Former residents include:

- Myra Ah Chee
- Jeff Barnes, the first Aboriginal man to join the RAAF in South Australia and the first to be appointed to the SA Aboriginal Advisory Board in 1964
- Nancy Barnes (née Brumbie, 1927), who became the first Aboriginal kindergarten director in 1957, and in 1965 was appointed to the SA Aboriginal Advisory Board and in 1983 became secretary of the Country Women's Association at Quorn
- Avis Gale (née Edwards), a Kokatha woman who was brought up at the Eden Hills site and was involved with the Blackwood Reconciliation Group in 1994, which helped to bring about the establishment of the Colebrook Reconciliation Park and wrote a poem which is featured on a plaque there
- Doreen Kartinyeri
- Nellie Lester, the first fully qualified Aboriginal nurse in South Australia.
- Amy Levai (née O'Donoghue), who became the first Aboriginal primary school teacher in South Australia in 1963
- Lowitja O'Donoghue
- Faith Thomas
- George Tongerie
- Violet Turner, author
