= Tim Hughes (disambiguation) =

Tim Hughes (born 1978) is a British worship leader and singer-songwriter.

Tim Hughes may also refer to:

- Tim Hughes (announcer) (born 1959), American sports announcer
- Tim Hughes (cricketer) (born 1943), British cricketer
- Tim Hughes (soldier) (1919–1976), Aboriginal soldier
