= Phil Graham (Australian rules) =

Australian rules football player (born 1961)

Phillip Graham (born 4 January 1961) is a former Australian rules football player who played for Central District Football Club in the South Australian National Football League (SANFL).

== Early life and family ==
Phillip Graham, an Aboriginal Australian man, was born on 4 January 1961. He grew up in Point Pearce on the Yorke Peninsula in South Australia. His father was Bradley Graham, who also played Aussie rules, winning a Mail Medal in the Mid North. Bradley's father was Cecil Graham, and football "was always a big part of family life". Cecil was a descendent of Kudnarto, a Kaurna woman famous for having made legal history by being the first Aboriginal Australian woman to marry a European settler in the colony of South Australia in 1848.

Phil's brothers, Brenton and Colin Graham, also played Aussie rules, and his sister Debra is the mother of AFL premiership players Troy Bond and Shane Bond. Footballer Michael Graham was their uncle.

== Football career ==
In 1978 Graham was recruited from Elizabeth Football Club as a 17-year-old by the Central District Football Club (Bulldogs), and played 12 seasons in the South Australian National Football League (SANFL). Playing mostly as a wingman (half forward), he played 196 senior games and kicked 167 goals in total. Bulldogs coach Daryl Hicks would place Graham in the at centre-half-forward position against Greg Phillips, then playing in the SANFL for Port Adelaide.

Graham was a member of the 1983 Indigenous All-Stars, along with brother Colin and uncle Michael.

== Recognition ==
In 1987 he was made a Life Member of the Bulldogs.
