= Kudnarto =

1848 Aboriginal Australian/settler marriage

- Born: c. 1832; Crystal Brook, South Australia
- Died: 11 February 1855 (aged c.23); Watervale, South Australia
- Other name: Mary Ann Adams
- Occupation: Landholder
- Years active: 1845–1855
- Known for: First Aboriginal Australian woman to marry a colonist in South Australia, and first Aboriginal woman to be granted Aboriginal reserve land

Kudnarto (c. 1832 – 11 February 1855), also known as Mary Ann Adams, was an Aboriginal Australian woman of the Ngadjuri peoples who lived in the colony of South Australia. She is notable for being the first Aboriginal woman to legally marry a colonist in South Australia, making legal history in 1848, and for having many notable descendants.

== Early life and education ==
Kudnarto (Note: Pronunciation can be listened to here.) was born around 1832 at a location in Ngadjuri lands later known as Crystal Brook, South Australia, or Bungaree, South Australia. Her mother is unknown and her father was Ngadjuri (whose traditional lands extend north of those of the Kaurna people). Her name means "a girl who is third born" in the Kaurna language, so it is likely that she had two elder sisters.

Her family lived and worked on English colonists' properties, so it is possible that she received some education in English during her childhood, but little is known of this stage of her life.

== Marriage ==
Kudnarto was around 14 years old when she met colonist Thomas Adams, 20 years her senior, and they started cohabiting. Adams worked as a shepherd on a property near Crystal Brook owned by settler Peter Fergusson. In 1847 Adams gave notice that he intended to marry Kudnarto, but first, they had to obtain permission from the inaugural Protector of Aborigines in the colony, Matthew Moorhouse. Moorhouse visited her a number of times to gauge her feelings on the matter, and to inform her of her obligations under British law should she marry him. He gave his approval after assessing that she indeed did wish to marry Adams, which had to then also be approved by the Lieutenant Governor of South Australia, Frederick Robe, which he gave.

As the first formal marriage between a colonist and an Aboriginal woman in South Australia, an article about the impending marriage was published in both the local newspaper, the South Australian Register, and The Port Phillip Patriot and Morning Advertiser in the colony of Victoria in June and July 1847 respectively. The report stated that she had been placed in the Native School in Adelaide for the purpose of instruction in domestic duties before marriage, and it praised her intelligence and disposition. She learnt to read and write in English in three months at the school, and became more educated than her husband.

The marriage took place on 27 January 1848 at the Adelaide registry office, with Moorhouse giving the bride away. Kudnarto spoke in English, but most of the newspaper reports (including one Cornwall, England) wrote about her appearance and temperament. Her husband was reported as being 37, with her ages variously reported as 16 or 17, and their length of cohabitation variously reported as two or three years. The newspapers also reported two other European men had also been considering marriage to their Aboriginal partners, marriages, and "now the ice is broken, it is probable they will carry their intentions into effect". The Sydney Morning Herald headed their report "Marriage extraordinary", while the South Australian Register opined:

It is an undoubted fact that the liberality of the present marriage law will favour the contemplated nuptials, whereas the pre-existing scruples under what was called the national rubric, would have presented obstacles difficult to be overcome, if not insurmountable. We ought not to omit to mention that to the expression of moral feeling on the part of his bush neighbours, or the strength of a moral principle in the individual himself, the contemplated union is to be attributed; and if it be so the most fastidious moralist may surely smile upon these heterogeneous candidates for the nuptial benediction and kindly wish them joy.

Upon marriage, Kudnarto took the name Mary Ann Adams. The couple lived at Wongalere, a homestead around 5 km (3.1 mi) south of the present town of Williamstown.

Reserves of land had been set aside for Aboriginal people to occupy and conduct agricultural activities on, but many of these were leased to colonists. In February 1848 Thomas Adams requested a section on Skillogalee Creek, near Auburn in the Clare Valley. This was supported by Moorhouse, so long as Kudnarto occupied and use the land; This was in order to protect Kudnarto in case of desertion by her husband, who was reportedly drank to excess. Kudnarto was granted a licence to Section 346, covering 81 acres (33 ha). Adams would not be allowed to sell or lease the land, and if Kudnarto died, he would lose the right to live there, although "there might be a renewal in favour of her children in case of her death". Thomas Snr did subsequently lease out the land while finding work on other properties, but it is not known if his wife and children accompanied him, or where they lived during this time.

In August 1850, both Kudnarto and her husband were called as witnesses in a murder trial.

== Children ==
Thomas Jnr was born on 19 June 1849. A second son, Timothy, was born on 11 October 1852.

== Death and legacy ==
Kudnarto died suddenly of unknown causes on 11 February 1855 in Watervale, in the Clare Valley, aged around 23.

Adams and the two children lost the right to occupy their land after her death, and the two boys went to Poonindie Mission, near Port Lincoln, as their father was unable to look after them and thought they would be looked after there. Both boys raised large families, and have many descendants. They were also known as excellent sheep shearers and ploughers, and played in the Poonindie cricket team.

Thomas Snr was admitted to the Destitute Asylum on Kintore Avenue in 1881, and died aged 74 in the Royal Adelaide Hospital in February 1882.

Thomas Jnr and Timothy continued to lodge many claims for their land at Skillogalee Creek, assisted by their father, in the 1860s through to the 1880s, all unsuccessful. Wanting to be independent farmers, they also applied for sections of land at Poonindie, but after several disputes with the superintendent, in 1888 they moved with their families to Point Pearce mission on Yorke Peninsula. Section 346 at Skillogalee Creek was eventually divided into four blocks by the government.

== Commemorations ==
Wellington Square in the residential suburb of North Adelaide, as part of the City of Adelaide's dual naming project in association with the University of Adelaide, was in March 2003 assigned the Kaurna name "Kudnartu", officially "Wellington Square/Kudnarto", in honour of Kudnarto.

The Adelaide branch of the international women's organisation Zonta added Kudnarto to their "Women's Roll of Honour", and erected a plaque in commemoration.

Her life is remembered in a 2007 memoir by Kudnarto's great-great grandson, Lewis Yerloburka O'Brien. In the book, he dedicates a chapter each to Kudnarto, Tom Adams Snr, "Tom and Tim Adams of Poonindie", and "The Adams family of Point Pearce mission".

== Descendants ==
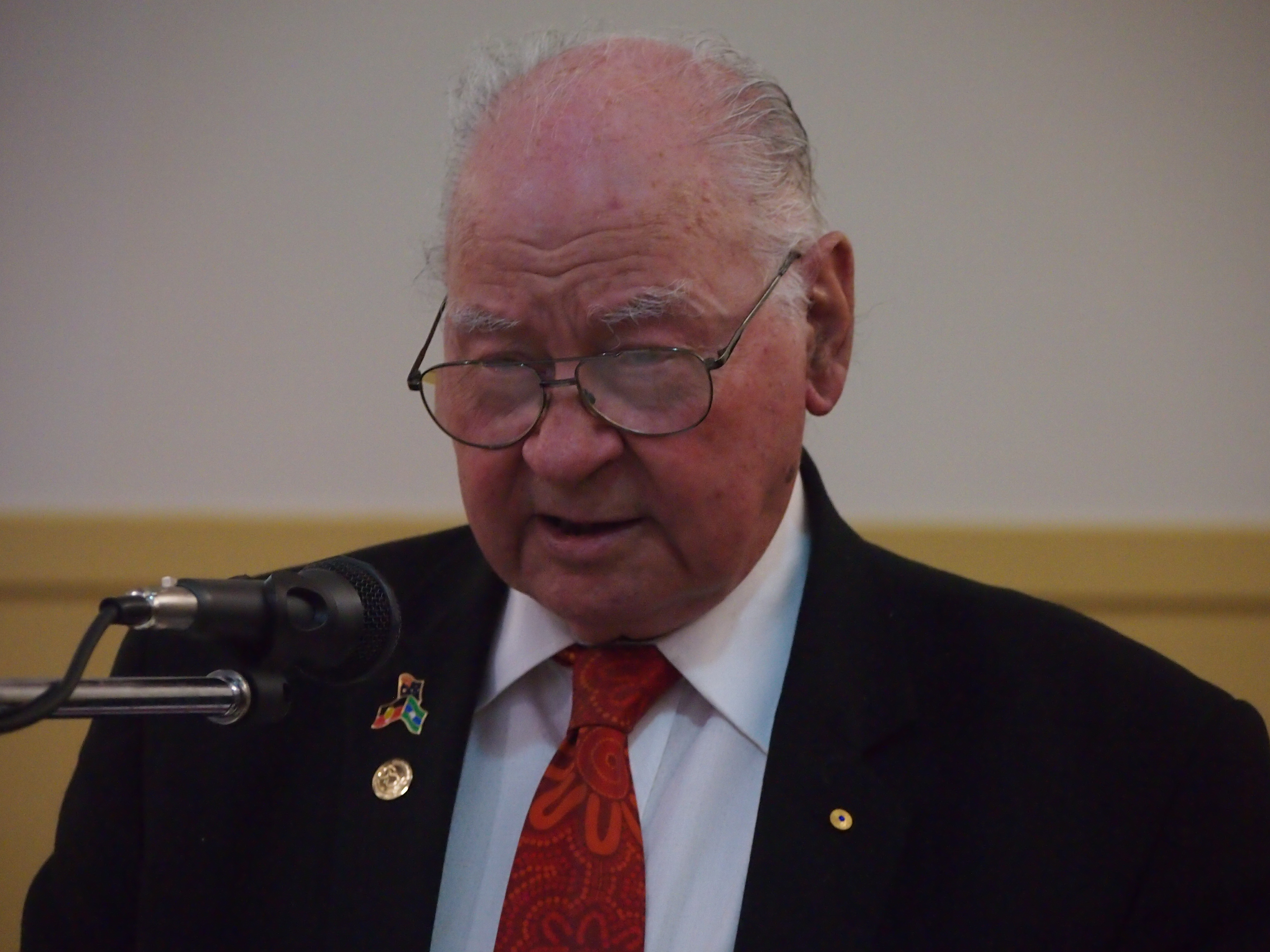
Uncle Lewis O'Brien in 2016

Tim married four times, losing three of his wives to illness, and had four children with second wife Bessie (née Reeves): Lewis, Gertrude, Julia, and Arthur. Tim and Bessie Adams moved around a bit before eventually moving to Point Pearce mission. After Poonindie Mission closed in 1894, the rest of the family, as well as Tom Adams and his children, also moved to Point Pearce.

- Gertrude Adams married William Williams and had four boys. Their descendants include (Note: Note conflicting accounts between ADB and Uncle Lewis O'Brien. ADB says that Elphick was daughter of John Herbert Walters, gas meter inspector, and Gertrude Adams, confirmed by Australia Birth Index, 1788-1922 records both Page Number: 208, Volume Number: 734)) Georgina Yambo Williams (1940–), activist and elder, who was an early leader of the revival of the Kaurna language in the mid-1980s, and largely responsible for the creation of Tjilbruke Dreaming Track (1986–2006)
- Julia Adams married Henry Simpson and had three daughters, including Gladys Florence Simpson, (Note: Gladys Elphick (born Walters, then Hughes) moved to Adelaide and lived with her cousin Gladys O'Brien, after her husband's death in 1937. Lewis O'Brien also writes of "Auntie Glad" (Elphick), his mother's cousin, with whom he went to live in Adelaide (p.131 of his autobiography) when he was 18 (i.e. c.1948, and there was Uncle Fred (Elphick - married Gladys in 1940), Granny Gertie, brother Lawrence, and cousin Alfie (See p.3 of his autobiography). He also talks of "Uncle Tim Hughes" (possibly his older cousin? - but only around 11 years older...)) whose children included educator and leader Lewis Yerloburka O'Brien (1930–). O'Brien relates in his memoir that he was largely parented by his great uncle Lewis and Auntie May (Edwards), who had no children of their own. (Note: See this journal article, p.107-8, for photos taken by Norman Tindale.)

Tom Jnr had five sons, all with no offspring. These must have included eldest grandchild William Adams, who gave evidence at the 1913 South Australian Royal Commission on the Aborigines, and Charlie Adams, who continued to put in claims to Section 346 at Skillogalee Creek until his death in 1949, but unsuccessfully. He also had four daughters, who married and took the names Angie, Sansbury, Wilson, and Edwards. Katie Edwards married Fred Warrior (aka Barney Waria), and their children included Josie Agius (1934–2016), one of South Australia's first Aboriginal health workers, (Note: Agius was honoured with the 2014 NAIDOC Award "for improving the lives and welfare of Aboriginal peoples in South Australia" and by the 2017 renaming of Park 22 in the Adelaide Park Lands by the City of Adelaide to Josie Agius Park / Wikaparntu Wirra (Park 22) (sister to Vince Copley)) and Vince Copley (1936-2022), activist, leader, and elder.

Other notable descendants of Kudnarto include:

- Gladys Elphick (née Walters; 1904–1988), m. Walter Hughes (1922); m. Frederick Elphick (1940); according to Lewis O'Brien, a cousin of his mother Gladys. Her son Timothy Hughes MBE (1919–1976) was a soldier
- Cecil Graham (1911–1994), Australian rules footballer, who, with his wife Doris May Graham (1912–2004), also a descendant, had 15 children, including several Australian rules footballers among their descendants and extended family: Their sons included Michael Graham and Bradley, whose sons included Colin Graham.
- Michael O'Loughlin (1977–), Australian Rules footballer
- Ali Abdullah-Highfold (1978–), family and community historian at the South Australian Museum
- Chad Wingard (1993–), Australian Rules footballer
