= Jeffcott Street =

Street in North Adelaide, South Australia

Jeffcott Street South Australia
- Coordinates: 34.902970°S 138.589976°E (North end); 34.912661°S 138.593456°E (South end)

General information
- Type: Street
- Location: North Adelaide
- Length: 1.2 km (0.7 mi)
- Opened: 1837

Major junctions
- North end: Jeffcott Road; North Adelaide
- Wellington Square
- South end: Montefiore Road; North Adelaide

Location(s)
- LGA(s): City of Adelaide

Jeffcott Street is a north–south street through the largest section of North Adelaide, South Australia.

== Route ==
It goes around the sides of Wellington Square. The southern end continues south as Montefiore Road over a bridge over the River Torrens and Adelaide Metro railyards to connect with the northern end of Morphett Street.

== History ==
Jeffcott Street was named in 1837 at a meeting to set street names after John Jeffcott, the first judge of the Supreme Court of South Australia and one of the members of the committee.

The Montefiore Road bridge below Jeffcott street is the latest of many on the site.

In 2019, Jeffcott street's powerlines were put underground with funding from the Power Line Environment Committee.
