= Tim Hughes (soldier) =

Australian decorated soldier (1919–1976)

Tim Hughes MBE MM
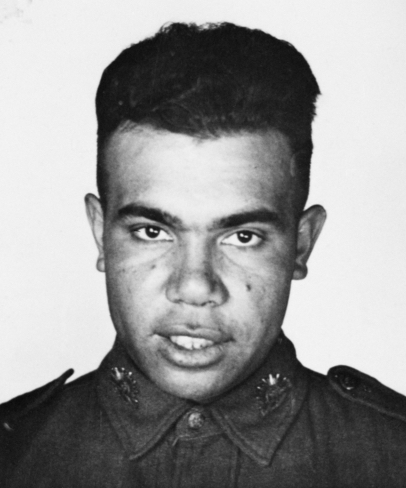
- Tim Hughes at enlistment in 1939
- Born: 28 April 1919; Point Pearce Aboriginal Station, South Australia, Australia
- Died: 1 April 1976 (aged 56); Ardrossan, South Australia, Australia
- Burial place: Centennial Park Cemetery, Pasadena, South Australia
- Spouse: Eileen O'Donoghue (m. 1945–1970)
- Military career
- Service: Army
- Service years: 1939–1945
- Rank: Corporal
- Service number: SX1570
- Unit: 2/10th Battalion
- Battles: North Africa campaign; Siege of Tobruk; New Guinea campaign; Battle of Milne Bay; Battle of Buna-Gona
- Awards: Member of the Order of the British Empire; Military Medal
- Memorials: Tim Hughes Stadium at the Repat Health Precinct, Daw Park, South Australia
- Other work: Soldier-settler (1953–1970); Chair of the South Australian Aboriginal Lands Trust (1966–1973)

Timothy Hughes MBE MM (28 April 1919 – 1 April 1976) was a decorated Australian Aboriginal soldier who served with the 2/10th Battalion during World War II, a successful soldier-settler, and later served as the inaugural chair of the South Australian Aboriginal Lands Trust from 1966 to 1973.

Born on a government-run Aboriginal station on the Yorke Peninsula of South Australia, Hughes completed the fifth grade at school then worked in agriculture until he enlisted in the Second Australian Imperial Force in December 1939 for service in World War II. Serving as an infantry soldier with the 2/10th Battalion, Hughes was on defensive duties in the United Kingdom from June to November 1940, then in the Middle East, including serving as part of the garrison of the Libyan port of Tobruk while it was besieged by the Axis forces from April to August 1941. After being withdrawn to garrison Aleppo in Syria, the battalion returned to Australia in March 1942.

After undergoing jungle training, the 2/10th Battalion was sent to fight the Japanese in New Guinea, and Hughes served with his unit during the Battle of Milne Bay in August and the Battle of Buna-Gona in December. It was during the latter battle that Hughes displayed conspicuous gallantry and bravery, coolness, initiative and disregard for his own safety, which was described as "remarkable" and a fine example to his platoon and company. For his actions he was awarded the Military Medal and was also promoted to the rank of corporal. He was wounded during the fighting for Sanananda in January 1943, but returned to his unit within a month. In March, the 2/10th returned to Australia. Hughes suffered from recurrent bouts of malaria and never returned to his unit. He was transferred to successive labour units in South Australia, but did not return to the fighting and was discharged at the end of the war.

Hughes married Eileen O'Donoghue, the older sister of Lowitja O'Donoghue – who was later a well-known public administrator and Indigenous rights advocate, before he was discharged, and the couple had two children. They initially share farmed on the Aboriginal station Hughes was born on, but in 1953 he was successful in obtaining a soldier-settler block at Conmurra in the south east of South Australia. Hughes had modest success as a farmer, but eventually his health failed and his marriage broke down. In the meantime he was appointed the inaugural chair of the South Australian Aboriginal Lands Trust, for which he was appointed a Member of the Order of the British Empire. Hughes died of a heart condition in 1976, aged 56.

== Early life ==
Timothy Hughes was born on 28 April 1919 at Point Pearce Aboriginal Station on the Yorke Peninsula of South Australia. His father Walter Stanford Hughes was of Narungga descent, and his mother Gladys Adams was of Kaurna-Ngadjuri heritage. Walter's father Alfred Hughes had given testimony to the 1913 state Royal Commission on the Aborigines chaired by William Angus. Tim's mother Gladys was the granddaughter of Kudnarto, who in 1848 was the first Aboriginal woman from South Australia to marry a non-Aboriginal man. Gladys had been taken to live with relatives at what was then Point Pearce Aboriginal Mission at the age of eight, and Walter and Gladys married at the Point Pearce Methodist Church on 13 June 1922. Walter was a shearer, and both he and Gladys worked as agricultural labourers. They had one other child, Alfred, born in 1933.

Tim attended the station school until he completed the fifth grade. By that time Walter was a share farmer on the station, so Tim worked for him and also as a contract shearer. Walter died in 1937 when Tim was 18 years old. Tim was an unemployed labourer living at Stenhouse Bay on the tip of the Yorke Peninsula when he enlisted in the Second Australian Imperial Force on 4 December 1939 for service in World War II, under the service number SX1570. When he enlisted, he put his age up by two years from 20 to 22, using a date of birth of 28 April 1917. In 1939, Tim's mother Gladys moved to the state capital Adelaide where she was employed as a domestic.

== World War II ==
=== United Kingdom ===
Hughes was allocated to the 2/10th Battalion, an infantry unit being trained at Woodside in the Adelaide Hills. The 2/10th Battalion was allocated to the 18th Brigade, which first concentrated at Greta, New South Wales, then underwent further training at Ingleburn, located southwest of Sydney. Hughes went on two weeks' pre-embarkation leave in March 1940, and then rejoined the rest of the battalion before they boarded HMT X4 – the requisitioned Cunard-White Star Line ocean liner RMS Mauretania – on 5 May and sailed towards the Middle East. In May and June, Nazi Germany quickly overran France, Belgium and the Netherlands, and the decision was taken to direct the 18th Brigade to the UK to assist in its defence. The 2/10th Battalion disembarked at Gourock in Scotland on 18 June. The 18th Brigade was transported to southern England and deployed on the Salisbury Plain in Wiltshire. They were re-equipped, underwent further training, and in October they redeployed to Colchester in Essex. By November, it had been decided that the threat of invasion had passed, and the battalion returned to Scotland and boarded HMT Strathaird at Glasgow, bound for the Middle East.

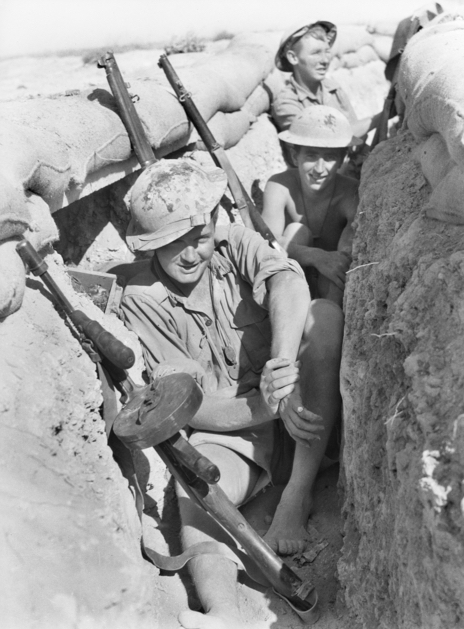
Soldiers from the 2/10th Battalion in a forward post during the Siege of Tobruk. Two of these men were killed in the Battle of Buna in December 1942.

=== North Africa campaign ===
The Strathaird sailed via South Africa to avoid potential attack in the Mediterranean Sea, with a short stop for shore leave in Durban, and disembarked in Egypt just before the new year. Originally, the 18th Brigade was preparing to deploy to Greece as part of the Allied deployment to assist the Greeks against an expected Axis invasion. When Axis forces advanced in Cyrenaica, the brigade was deployed instead to the Libyan port of Tobruk as part of the garrison, the famous "Rats of Tobruk". The town was besieged by the Axis forces from 10 April, and the battalion was heavily engaged until August, including fierce fighting during the Battle of the Salient in May, in which the unit suffered six missing and fifteen wounded. In August, the 2/10th Battalion was withdrawn to Palestine for training, and the following month they were sent to garrison Aleppo in Syria. Syria and Lebanon had been captured from the collaborationist Vichy French by the Allies while the 2/10th Battalion had been at Tobruk. Hughes had a stay in hospital in mid-December.

In January 1942, after a freezing winter when many soldiers experienced snow for the first time, the battalion went back to Palestine, and embarked on the transatlantic ocean liner Nieuw Amsterdam to sail to Bombay in British India. Here they changed ships and completed the journey to Adelaide aboard the SS Nevasa. They disembarked on 29 March but were soon sent to Kilcoy in Queensland for jungle training prior to deployment north to fight the Japanese. During this period, Hughes spent several weeks in hospital with an infection.

=== New Guinea campaign ===
On 5 August, the 2/10th Battalion boarded the Dutch transport SS Both at Brisbane. Seven days later the battalion landed at Milne Bay in the Territory of Papua, where it and the rest of the 18th Brigade reinforced the Militia units from the 7th Brigade that were defending the area. Two weeks later the Japanese landed a force at Milne Bay in an attempt to capture the airfields that the Allies had established there. The Australians and their Allies won the ensuing Battle of Milne Bay decisively. After the initial Japanese lodgement was held by the Militia's 61st Battalion, the 2/10th relieved them before taking part in hard fighting around a mission station known as the KB Mission, during which the battalion lost 43 killed and 26 wounded.

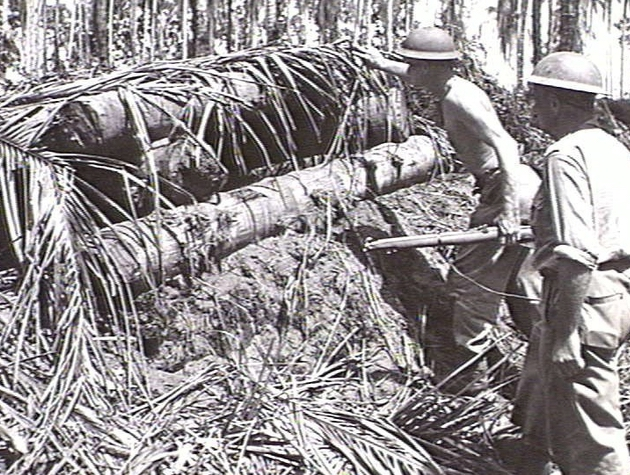
Australian infantry examining Japanese bunkers at Buna. There were many of these machine gun posts defending the old airstrip at Buna.

In October, the 2/10th was flown to Wanigela, near the north Papuan coast, where they conducted patrols and defended the beach against a possible Japanese landing and helped to construct an airfield. The battalion's next major action came in late December 1942 during the Battle of Buna-Gona, after being transported by sea to the beachhead front, landing just south of Cape Endaiadere. Heavily engaged around the disused Buna airstrip where the Japanese had constructed a series of bunkers, in a fortnight of fighting the battalion suffered 113 killed and 205 wounded in a series of ill-conceived assaults. It was during this battle that, on 26 December, during the advance along the old airstrip, Hughes' platoon was pinned down by Japanese machine-gun fire. Hughes volunteered to climb on top of an aircraft dispersal bay and, despite coming under concentrated fire from three directions, engaged two Japanese posts with hand grenades. Returning for a Thompson submachine gun, he climbed back onto the dispersal bay and protected his platoon while they took cover, after which he made three sorties with the sub-machine gun and hand grenades, which enabled his platoon to consolidate its position. His conspicuous gallantry and bravery, coolness, initiative and disregard for his own safety was described as "remarkable" and a fine example to his platoon and company. On 3 January 1943 Hughes was promoted to the acting rank of corporal.

On 19 January, the 2/10th Battalion launched an attack on the nearby village of Sanananda, and during the assault Hughes, described as "usually in the forefront of any action", was wounded in the left arm. He was evacuated to a field ambulance then casualty clearing station, but had recovered enough to rejoin his unit by 7 February. The 2/10th Battalion flew to Port Moresby and then embarked to return to Australia on 8 March, disembarking at Cairns two days later. Hughes was either hospitalised or convalescing from bouts of malaria for most of the rest of 1943, and never returned to the 2/10th Battalion. In May 1943, his award of the Military Medal for his bravery at Buna was gazetted; the citation read:

For conspicuous gallantry and bravery during Buna aerodrome action.

At 0700 hours 26 December 1942 No. 9 Platoon A Company 2/10th Battalion reached its objective in the centre of Buna strip and came under heavy enemy machine gun fire from both sides of the strip and from machine gun posts south and east of the dispersal bay at 282250 (Ref. map Buna locality).

The platoon was definitely pinned down. To allow the platoon to dig in Private Hughes volunteered to climb on top of the dispersal bay under concentrated fire from three directions. From this position he engaged two of the enemy posts with grenades.

Private Hughes returned for a Thompson sub-machine gun and from his position on the dispersal bay gave covering fire while his platoon moved into cover.

During the period his platoon was consolidating he made three separate sorties with grenades and the Thompson sub-machine gun.

Private Hughes showed remarkable bravery, exceptional coolness and initiative. His total disregard for his own safety set a fine example throughout the platoon and also throughout the company.

=== Further service ===
In July 1943 Hughes' promotion to corporal was confirmed. He was transferred to the 31st Employment Company in August. The company was made up of conscripted Aboriginal soldiers and "aliens" (non-British subjects), except for the officers and senior non-commissioned officers, and was used for labouring duties. Hughes continued to have significant bouts of malaria throughout the rest of 1943 and was medically downgraded in early 1944. He was then posted to the transhipment centre at Terowie in the Mid North of South Australia where there was a break of gauge from the broad-gauge line running south through Burra with the narrow-gauge line that ran north to Peterborough. There was a great deal of transhipment of loads from one rail gauge to the other at Terowie throughout the war, and a significant amount of labour was required to perform this work. In July 1945 Hughes was posted to the 29th Australian Works Company, another labour unit, but the malaria persisted, and it was soon decided that he should be discharged. Tim married Eileen O'Donoghue in Adelaide on 2 August and was discharged on 5 September. Eileen was an older sister of Lowitja O'Donoghue, who was later a well-known public administrator and Indigenous rights advocate. Tim's younger brother Alfred served in the Army from 1951 to 1954, including service in the Korean War with the 1st Battalion, Royal Australian Regiment, in 1952 and 1953.

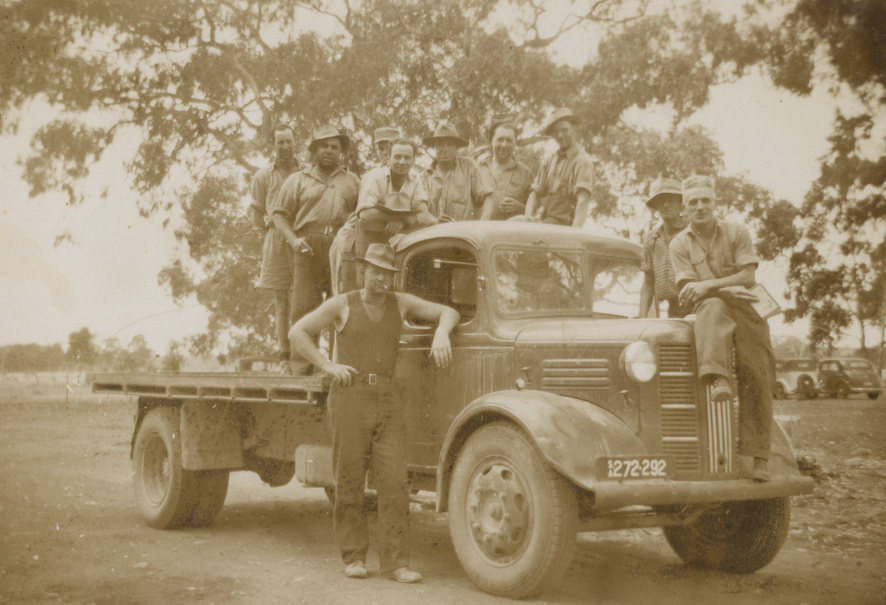
A land clearing team at Keppoch, South Australia, c. 1950. Hughes is second from the left on the back of the truck.

== Post-war career ==
Hughes and his wife share farmed at Point Pearce for four years after the war. He remained subject to the Aborigines Act 1934–1939, which limited his freedom of movement and access to the benefits of citizenship.

After attending a course at the Wingfield Rural Training Centre, Hughes became involved with the War Service Land Settlement Scheme in south-eastern South Australia. Eileen and the then state Minister for Repatriation, Cecil Hincks MP, encouraged him to apply for a soldier settlement scheme block, and in 1953 he leased a 979-acre (396 ha) block at Conmurra, about 40 km (25 mi) inland from Robe. He initially ran a herd of dairy cows, but soon switched to sheep and trained as a wool classer. In 1956 he requested and received exemption from the Aborigines Act. The Aborigines Act allowed for Aboriginal people to be declared as "by reason of their character, standard of intelligence, and development ... capable of living in the general community without supervision". This provision could be applied as a punishment, and many Aboriginal people resented being forced to carry a certificate that effectively declared them "honorary whites". Hughes himself deeply resented what was referred to as a "dog licence" and expressed criticism about the way Aboriginal people were treated under the law. Until the local church was built, Hughes, who was a strict Methodist, held services at the family home. Over twenty-two years of farming, Hughes had reasonable success "by dint of planning, hard work and resilience", and was well-regarded by the local people. His livestock and heavy equipment were mortgaged to the Lands Department - the government body responsible for crown land and surveying, and Hughes was only permitted expenses of 18 pounds a week. He and Eileen had a son and a daughter.

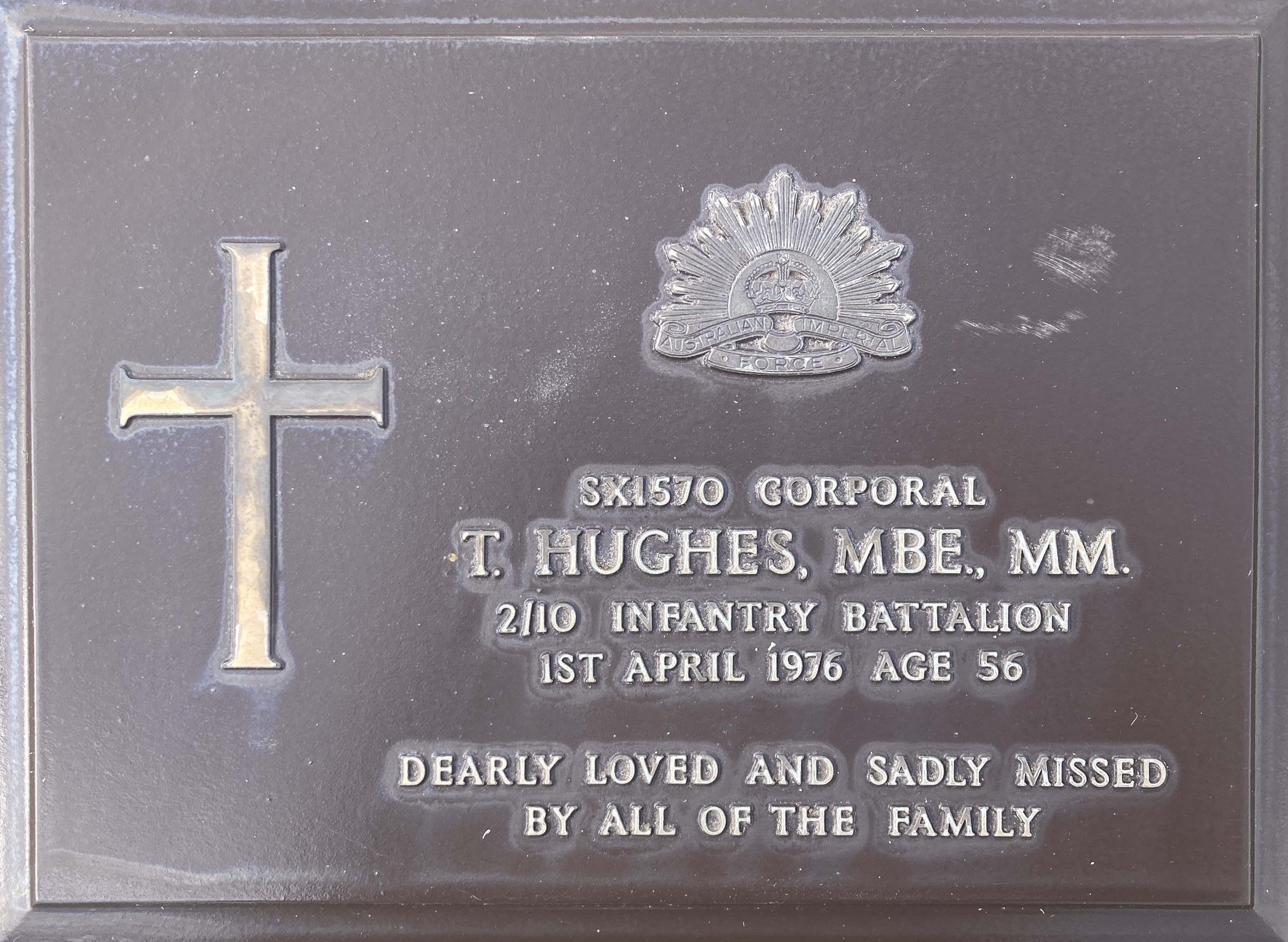
The plaque on Hughes' grave

Hughes was appointed as the first chairman of the Aboriginal Lands Trust established in 1966, and led the trust for six years, during which it expanded to control assets worth $250,000. He separated from Eileen in 1967 and had a heart attack later that year. When he suffered from a stroke the following year, it meant that he could no longer do the heavy physical work of farming. The couple divorced in 1970. In the Queen's Birthday Honours of that year he was appointed as a Member of the British Empire (MBE) for his services as chairman of the Aboriginal Lands Trust. His mother Gladys was appointed MBE the following year for her services to the Aboriginal community and went on to be South Australian Aborigine of the Year in 1984. Tim Hughes died of a coronary occlusion at Ardrossan on 1 April 1976, aged 56, and was buried at Derrick Gardens at Centennial Park Cemetery.

In 1996, an entry about Hughes was included in Volume 14 of the Australian Dictionary of Biography published by the National Centre of Biography at the Australian National University. He was featured in the Call of Country travelling exhibition developed by the History Trust of South Australia, which was launched in 2015. The stadium at the Repat Health Precinct at Daw Park, South Australia, is named after him.

== Footnotes ==
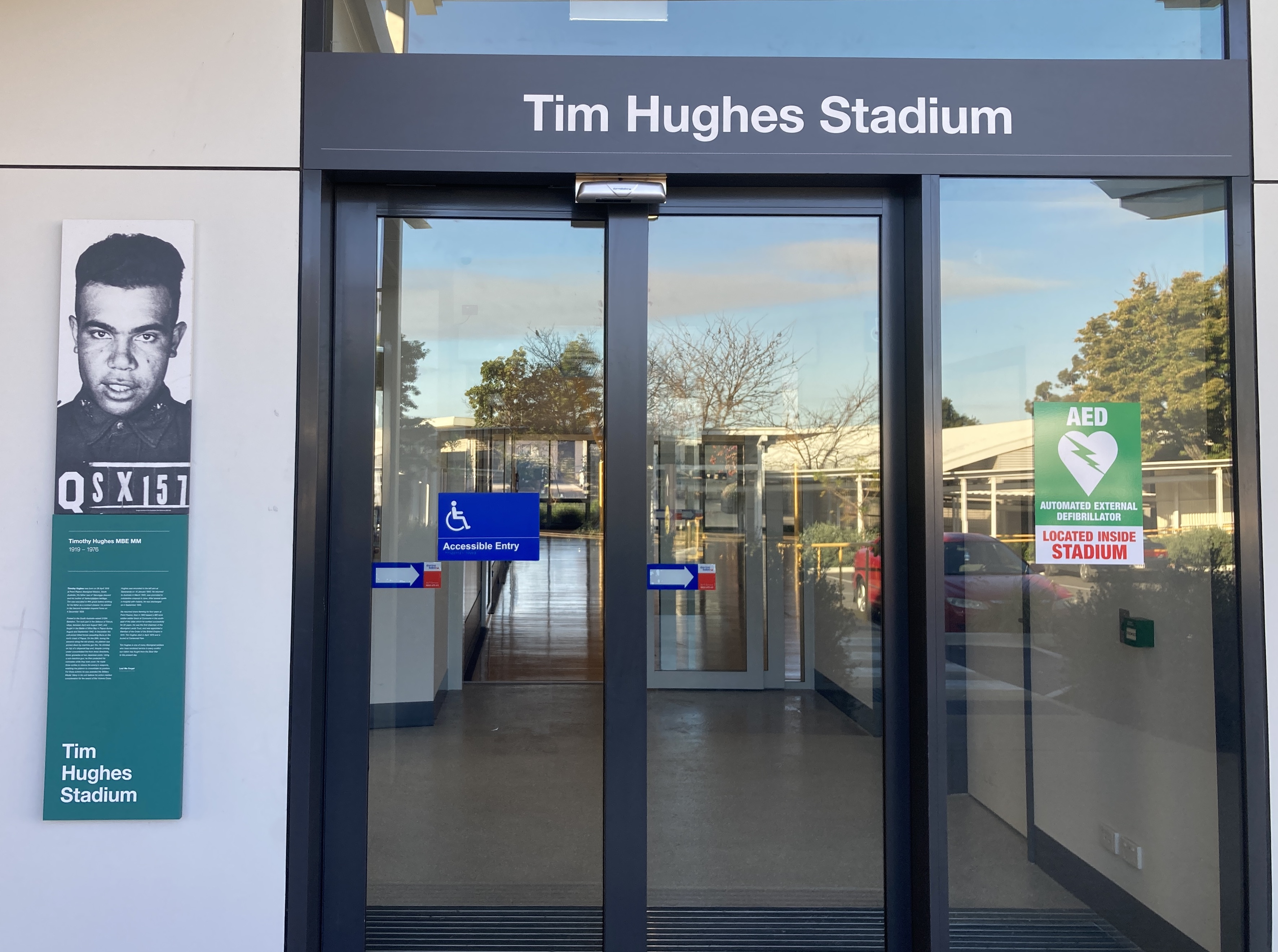
The entrance to Tim Hughes Stadium at the Repat Health Precinct, Daw Park, South Australia
