= Football Park =

Australian rules football oval and former stadium in West Lakes, South Australia

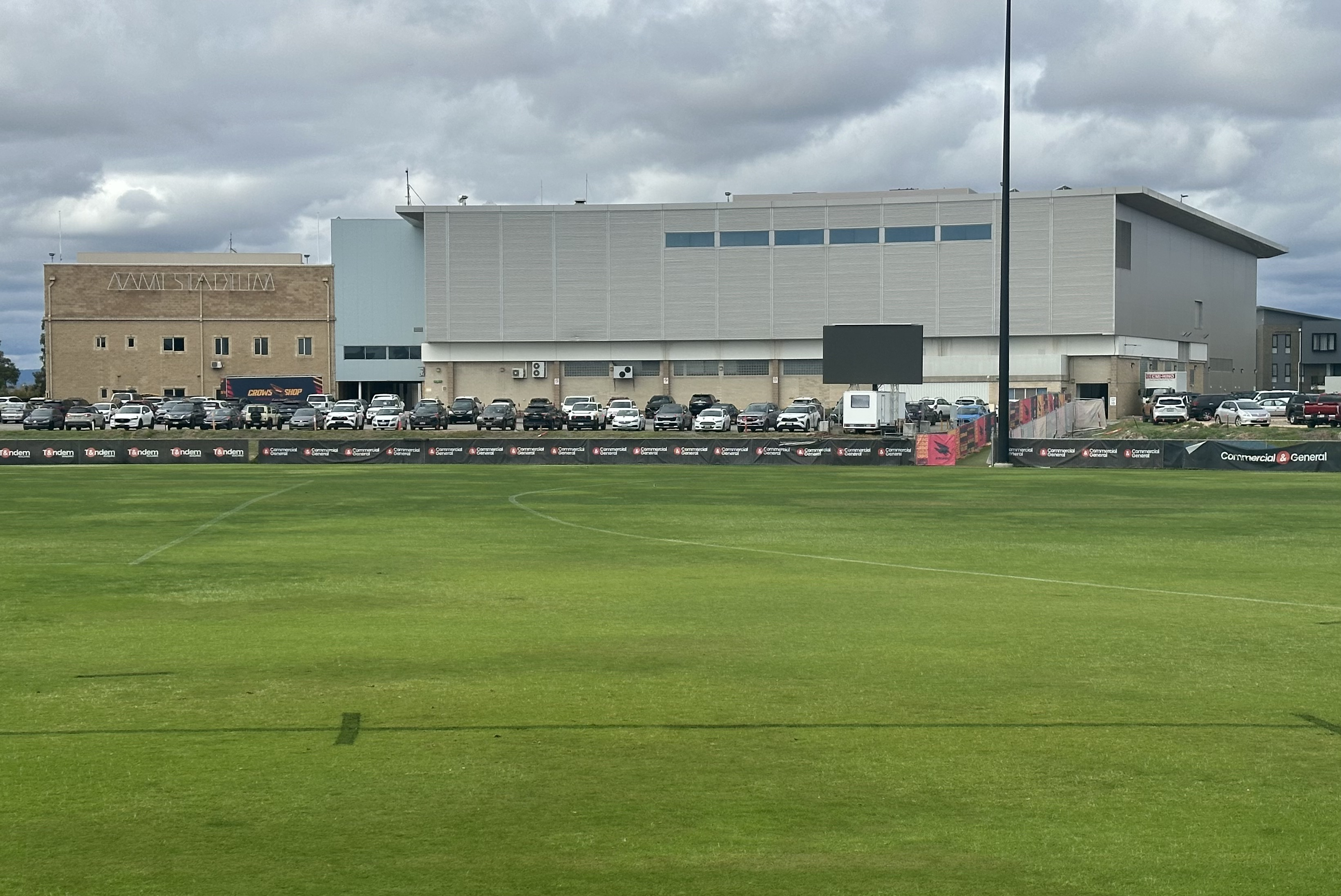
- Football Park in 2026
- Interactive map of Football Park
- Former names: AAMI Stadium (2002–2015)
- Address: Turner Drive; West Lakes, South Australia
- Coordinates: 34°52′48″S 138°29′44″E
- Owner: SANFL
- Operator: SANFL
- Capacity: 51,240 (2004–2018)
- Record attendance: 66,897 (Sturt v Port Adelaide, 1976 SANFL Grand Final)
- Field size: 165 metres x 135 metres

Construction
- Groundbreaking: 1971; 55 years ago
- Opened: 1974; 52 years ago
- Cost: A$6.6 million

Tenants
- Australian Football League Adelaide Football Club (Note: Played games at stadium from 1991 to 2013. The club headquarters was attached to the stadium until demolition of the stadium grandstands. The club uses the stadium's former playing surface as its primary training ground until late 2026, when it will move into an upgraded Thebarton Oval.); Port Adelaide Football Club (1997–2013) South Australian National Football League Woodville-West Torrens Football Club (1991–1992); Glenelg Football Club (1991)

Football Park is an Australian rules football oval and former large-scale stadium located in the Adelaide suburb of West Lakes. It opened in 1974 to provide a playing and administrative home for the South Australian National Football League (SANFL), the leading football organisation in South Australia.

The SANFL held its finals and grand finals at Football Park for nearly 40 years. From 1991 until 2013, the stadium (known under naming rights as AAMI Stadium from 2002) was the home ground of Adelaide and Port Adelaide in the Australian Football League (AFL).

After Adelaide Oval was redeveloped, AFL and SANFL matches moved to the newly redeveloped oval and the stadium grandstands were subsequently demolished. The playing surface was retained and remains used by the Adelaide Football Club and SANFL, with the area known as the Footy Park Precinct.

== History ==
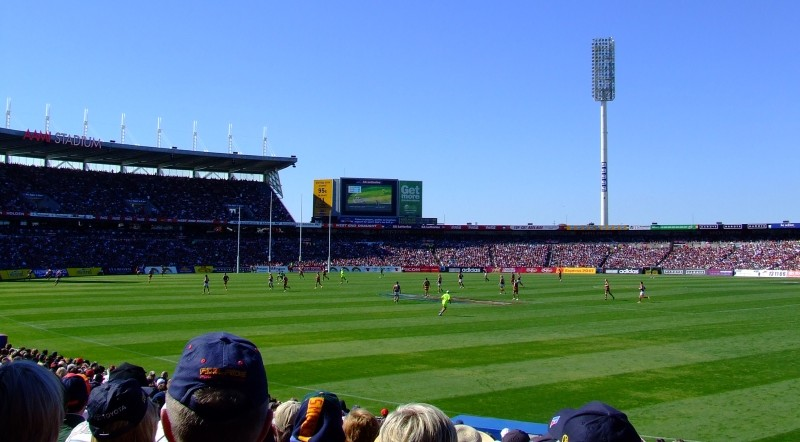
View of Football Park in April 2007

Ground was broken for Football Park in 1971, giving the SANFL its own venue after years of playing out of the Adelaide Oval, which was controlled by the South Australian Cricket Association (SACA). Due to ongoing conflicts with the SACA, the SANFL had wanted to leave Adelaide Oval and move into their own home stadium for a number of years, finally settling on the undeveloped swampland at West Lakes in 1970 (the same year as the similarly designed, but larger VFL Park opened in Melbourne).

The stadium hosted its first football game on 4 May 1974, a SANFL match between Central District and North Adelaide. The first goal was kicked by North Adelaide's Barry Hearl, but Central District won the game defeating North Adelaide by 30 points.

Intended to have a capacity of around 80,000, Football Park was originally standing room only in the outer (along with the usual crush barriers) with bench seating in the main grandstand and ended up with a capacity of approximately 62,000. Bench seating was gradually added to the stadium's bowl section, and the concourse roof was finished in 1982, by which time the grounds capacity had settled to around 55,000. The new roof gave the outer of the ground a limited number of under cover seats, as well as opening up more space for advertising boards. Television screens showing the games in progress at the ground were also in place under the concourse roof, as well as in the members area.

After long-term negotiations with the State Government and the local council, as well as local residents, the SANFL started building the ground's four light towers in late 1983. These were finished by early 1984, with all night games in Adelaide moving from the suburban grounds (Norwood Oval and Thebarton Oval) to league headquarters for the next 16 years. Following Adelaide joining the AFL in 1991, and being joined by Port Adelaide in 1997, new corporate "superboxes" were built on top of the southern concourse, stretching from the scoreboard around to the members grandstand. The following year (1998) the stadium got its first video superscreen, although the old scoreboard located above the tunnel in the south-east corner remained in place as the main scoreboard.

After years of speculation, Football Park's members grandstand was extended in 2001 with the opening of the new Northern Grandstand, opening up 7,000 new seats. The new grandstand was fitted with individual plastic seats, and the rest of the stadium was finally brought into line with this in 2004, seeing an end to the unpopular aluminum bench seating, and dropping capacity to 51,240.

In addition to football, Football Park has also hosted cricket matches, including the Kerry Packer-run World Series Cricket competition of the late 1970s when the upstart competition was shut out of major grounds such as the Adelaide Oval. And from 1983–1988, Football Park also hosted the South Australian state one-day team McDonald's Cup games. This included day/night games after Football Park's lights were first used in 1984, necessary due to Adelaide Oval not getting its own lights for night games until 1997. Unfortunately, the one-day games at the stadium were not well attended (not to mention the almost empty stadium being a bad look when the games were nationally televised by Channel 9) and after 1988 all state cricket games were moved back to the Adelaide Oval.

The stadium has also hosted international rules football games between Australia and Ireland, as well as being used for rock concerts. Football Park also hosted a National Soccer League game during the early-mid 1990s with West Adelaide Hellas being the designated home side.

The record football crowd at Football Park was 66,897 when Sturt defeated Port Adelaide in the 1976 SANFL Grand Final, though police believe the attendance figure was closer to 80,000. To avoid a crush, spectators were allowed on the field between the boundary line and the fence, and thousands were turned away by police as the house full signs went up. It was after this game that the original intended capacity of 80,000 was deemed unworkable for safety reasons so capacity was capped at around 62,000.

Adelaide and Port Adelaide played their last home games at Football Park in 2013, with both clubs moving to the Adelaide Oval in 2014. The record Showdown attendance at Football Park was recorded at Showdown XIX on 10 September 2005 when 50,521 saw the Crows defeat the Power by 83 points in the 2005 First Semi Final. A pre-season match was played at the ground between the two sides in March 2015, in what was the last official event to be held at the ground.

=== Concerts ===
Major artists held concerts at Football Park, including The Beach Boys, ABBA, Neil Diamond, Alice Cooper, Dire Straits, Electric Light Orchestra, U2, The Rolling Stones, Genesis, Elton John with the Melbourne Symphony Orchestra on 21 November 1986 and Robbie Williams. Bon Jovi performed at Football Park in December 2013, while One Direction performed in February 2015.

== Highest attendances ==
Five highest attended events
Number	Event	Type	Attendance	Date
1	1976 SANFL Grand Final	Football match	66,897 – 76,000	25 September 1976
2	U2 (and Kanye West)	Concert	60,000 / 58,000+	16 November 2006
3	1974 SANFL Grand Final	Football match	58,113	28 September 1974
4	1977 SANFL Grand Final	Football match	56,717	24 September 1977
5	Dire Straits	Concert	55,000+	12 February 1986

== Upgrades ==
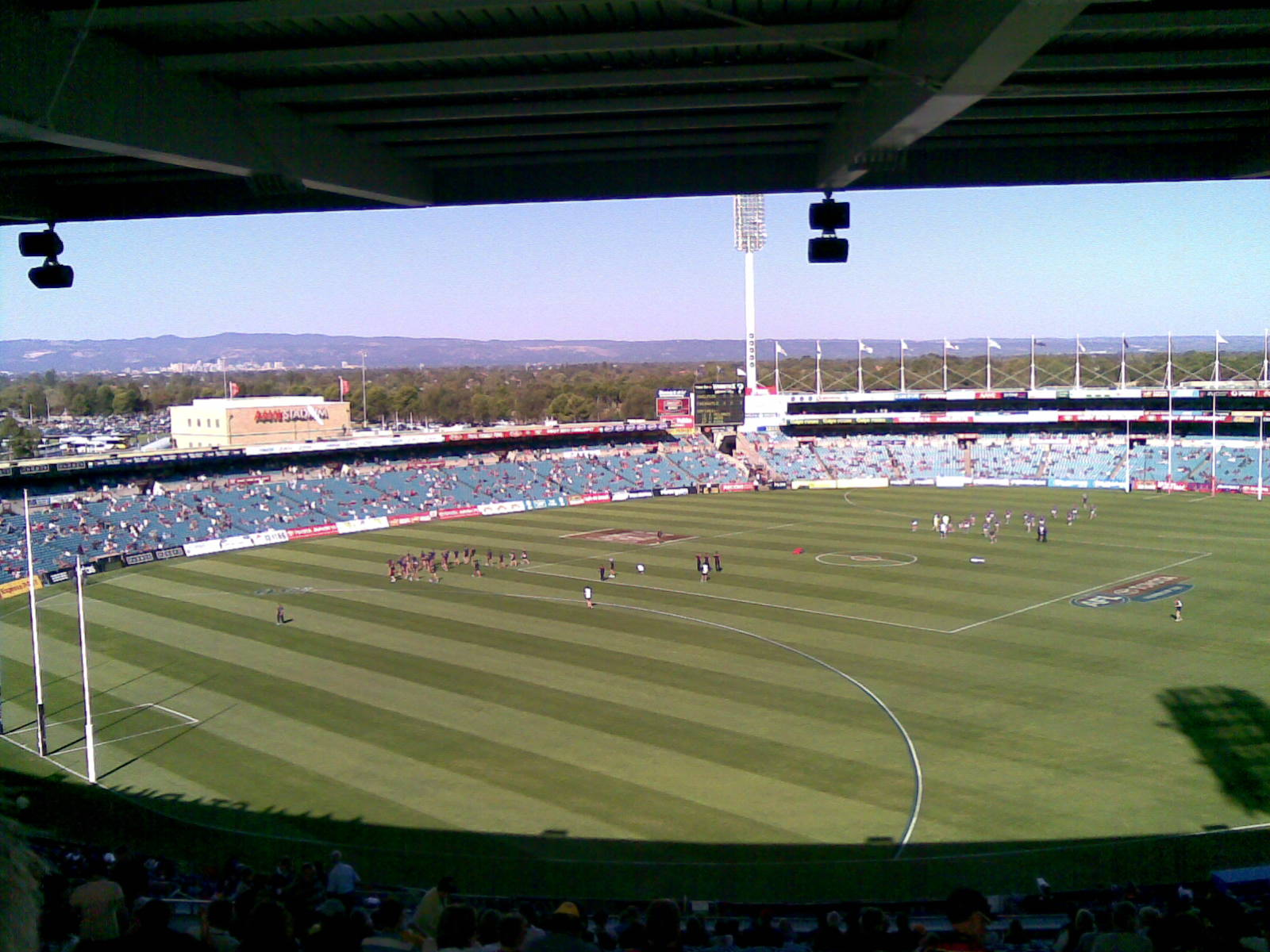
Inside the stadium; view from Northern Grandstand

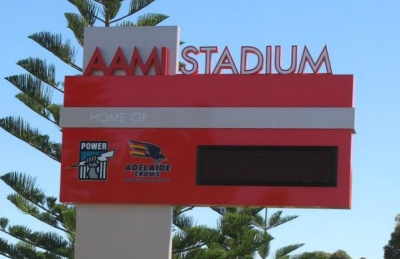
Exterior sign

After it was built, Football Park underwent several additions including:

- In 1982 the outer concourse was completed during the SANFL season giving a limited number of permanent undercover seats for the general public. The stadium was also converted to an all-seater stadium with the installation of aluminium bench seating on the outer's lower deck which had previously been concrete terraces (the seating had already been installed in the members area which included the main grandstand). This reduced capacity at the time from 62,000 to around 55,000.
- In 1984 the light towers were installed. The first game played under lights at the stadium was an Escort Cup match which saw South Adelaide defeat Glenelg 10.9 (69) to 7.8 (50). The game was Glenelg champion Peter Carey's 300th game of SANFL league football. To appease the local residents, night games at Football Park had a 10:30pm curfew.
- In 1985 alcohol was banned from the seats. Alcohol could only be consumed in the bar areas. In 2009, this ban was removed.
- In 1997 the stadium opened new corporate facilities, with Superboxes at the southern end of the ground extending from the outer side tunnel to the members grandstand.
- In 1998 a superscreen was added to the north-east side of the ground.
- In 2001 the balcony upper level of seats was extended towards the Northern End of the ground giving an extra 7,000 seats to the stadium.
- In 2004 the existing aluminium bench seating on the lower deck was replaced with plastic bucket seats leaving the seating capacity at 51,240.
- In 2007:
  - The sound system was upgraded with new plastic PA speakers installed all around the stadium.
  - A new and louder siren was installed.
  - Another superscreen was installed at the southern end of the ground to aid viewers sitting under the existing superscreen on the northeast side of the ground.
  - A new scoreboard was built under the existing superscreen.

Further upgrades, which largely did not eventuate, were proposed in June 2008.

== Demolition and future site usage ==
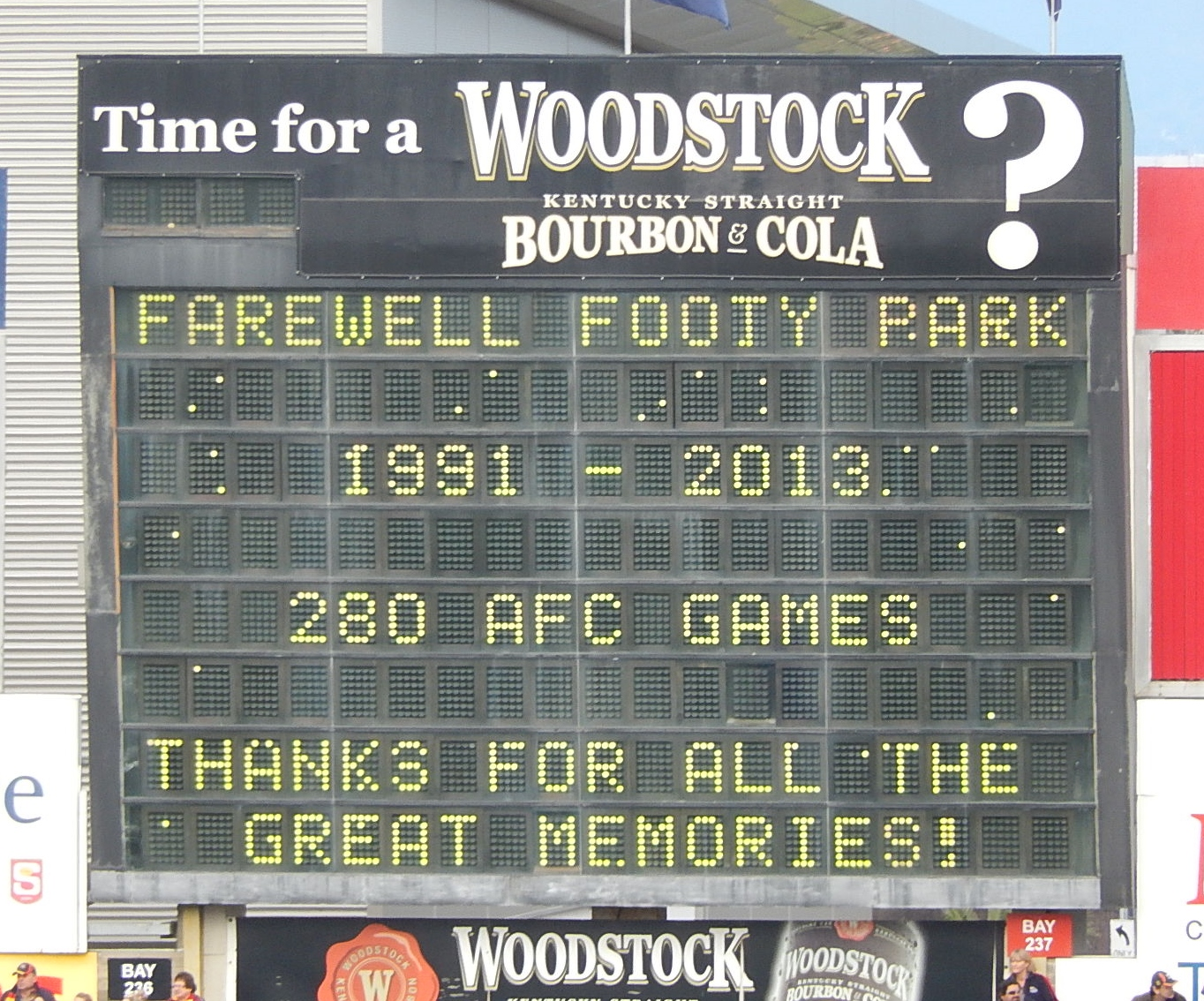
Message on the scoreboard following the final Crows match at Football Park in 2013

Proposed upgrades to the stadium were abandoned following confirmation that both the Adelaide and Port Adelaide football clubs would move matches to the newly redeveloped Adelaide Oval, which has a capacity of 53,583 and is located very close to the city. SANFL finals, which had been played at the ground since its opening, were moved back to the Adelaide Oval in 2014. The SANFL announced a long-term development plan for the broader precinct in November 2014 with property developers Commercial & General for AU$71 million. Most of the land surrounding the oval was redeveloped to provide 1,600 new houses, a library, retail area and a five-storey, 120-bed aged care facility. Following the announcement, most of the seating at the ground was removed and given to local football clubs, before full-scale demolition work on the grandstands began in August 2018. The demolition of the grandstands was completed in March 2019.

Adelaide Football Club continue to use the oval as their headquarters, and have their own clubrooms, administrative offices and indoor training facilities on the eastern side of the ground, a similar arrangement to what fellow AFL club Hawthorn had with Waverley Park in Melbourne, until that club's move to the Kennedy Community Centre. The club announced their intention to move their training headquarters to an upgraded Thebarton Oval in June 2024, and are expected to complete the move in 2026. During this time, the local council approved an application by the SANFL for a 42-year lease on the oval, enabling SANFL talent development offices to return to the former Football Park site in a newly designed building adjacent to the oval and have exclusivity of the oval for approximately three hours on weeknights and five hours on weekends. The development included unisex changing rooms, indoor training facilities, rehabilitation spaces, coaching/talent/sports science offices and other spaces. The new facility was named the SANFL High Performance Centre and was opened in December 2025.

== Dimensions ==
The playing surface covered approximately 2 hectares, with the average distance between the boundary line and fence being six metres. The ground dimensions from fence to fence were 177 m × 145 m (194 yd × 159 yd) and the playing area inside the boundary lines was 165 m × 135 m (180 yd × 148 yd) and the goals ran north to south. There was a drop of approximately 1.5 metres from the centre of the ground to the fence to help with drainage, leaving the ground with a distinctive hump.
