= 1976 SANFL Grand Final =

Port Adelaide	Sturt
10.15 (75)	17.14 (116)
	1	2	3	4
PTA	2.5 (17)	3.8 (26)	7.13 (55)	10.15 (75)
STU	1.3 (9)	7.6 (48)	11.8 (74)	17.14 (116)
- Date: Saturday 25 September, 2:10 pm
- Stadium: Football Park
- Attendance: 66,897

Broadcast in Australia
- Network: Seven Network

The 1976 SANFL Grand Final was an Australian rules football game contested between the Port Adelaide Football Club and the Sturt Football Club, held at Football Park on 25 September 1976. It was the 55th annual Grand Final of the South Australian National Football League, staged to determine the premiers for the 1976 SANFL season. Port Adelaide were heavy favourites, but Sturt won by a margin of 41 points, marking the club's 12th premiership victory.

== Record Attendance ==
The Grand Final sold a state record 66,987 tickets but when the SANFL ran out they opened Football Park's gates for free and the crowd grew by an estimated 15,000. The gates were shut by police 90 minutes before the bounce as spectators were being crushed. Subsequently, the police allowed thousands of spectators onto the field to sit along the fence to prevent any further physical injuries.

== Teams ==
Sturt
Forward:	T.Sims	G.Wild	R.Barton
Half-Forward	M.Graham	R.Klomp	J.Murphy
Center	T.Burgan	B.Howard	B.Miels
Half-Back	T.Lloyd	P.Nelson	P.Sanders
Back-Line	N.Wark	C.Casey	G.Lauder
Ruck	R.Davies	P.Bagshaw (c)	M.Nunan
Reserves	P.Heinrich	R.Hill	
Coach	J.Oatey		
