= Wellington Square, North Adelaide =

Public square in Adelaide, South Australia

Wellington Square
- Kudnartu
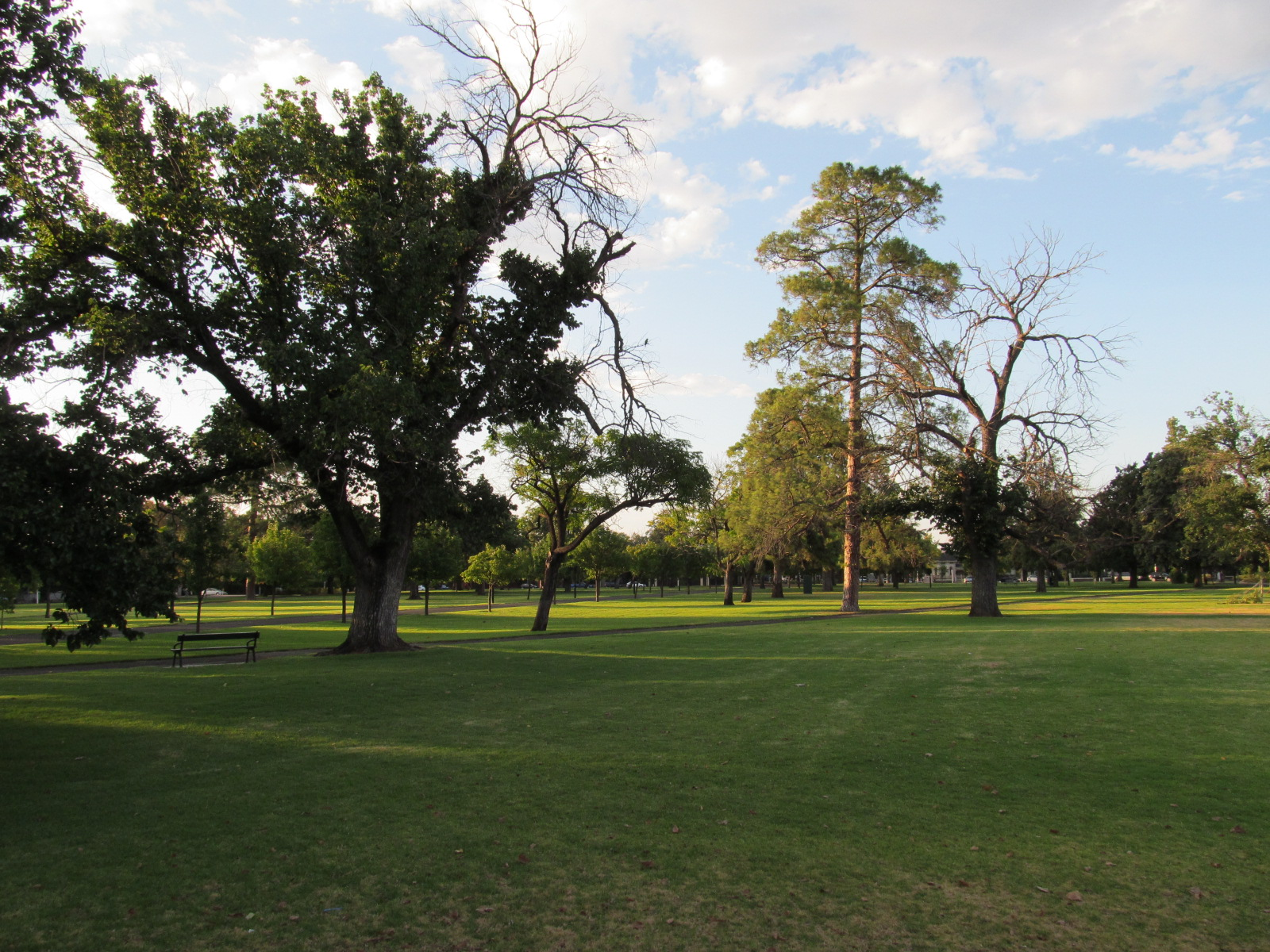
- Wellington Square in 2012

- Location within City of Adelaide
- Namesake: Arthur Wellesley, 1st Duke of Wellington
- Maintained by: City of Adelaide
- Location: North Adelaide, South Australia, Australia
- Postal code: 5006
- Coordinates: 34.9073°S 138.5915°E
- North: Jeffcott Street
- East: Tynte Street
- South: Jeffcott Street
- West: Molesworth Street

Construction
- Completed: 1837

Other
- Designer: William Light

Wellington Square, also known as Kudnartu and officially Wellington Square/Kudnarto, is a public square in the Adelaide suburb of North Adelaide, South Australia, in the City of Adelaide. It is roughly at the centre of the largest of the three grids which comprise North Adelaide.

It is one of six squares designed by the founder of Adelaide, Colonel William Light, who was Surveyor-General at the time, in his 1837 plan of the Adelaide city centre and North Adelaide. The square was named in 1837 by the Street Naming Committee after the Duke of Wellington, and in 2003 it was assigned a second name, Kudnartu, in the Kaurna language of the original inhabitants, as part of the Adelaide City Council's dual naming initiative. Kudnarto was a Kaurna woman from the Clare District. Hers was the first official Aboriginal/settler marriage in South Australia. (Note: Spelt "Konarto" in the "Register of Births, Deaths & Marriage", Book 1, page 333)

== History ==
=== Pre-colonial history ===
The Adelaide area was inhabited long before European settlement in 1836 by one of the tribes which later came to be known as the Kaurna people, or Adelaide tribe.

=== As Wellington Square ===
The square was named on 23 May 1837 after Arthur Wellesley, 1st Duke of Wellington, Irish-born field marshal and statesman, victor at Waterloo and Prime Minister of the United Kingdom from 1828 to 1830, who is credited with securing the passage of the South Australia Foundation Act through the British House of Lords in 1834. Colonel Light, first Surveyor-General of South Australia and a member of the Street Naming Committee, had briefly served under Wellington as a junior staff officer, a Deputy Assistant Quartermaster General (DAQMG), during the Peninsular War. Light's 1837 plan of Adelaide included Wellington Square.

=== Dual naming ===
In March 2003, as part of the City of Adelaide's dual naming project in association with the University of Adelaide, the square was assigned the name "Kudnartu", officially "Wellington Square/Kudnarto". The name commemorates a Kaurna woman from the Crystal Brook area called Kudnarto (Note: Spelt "Konarto" in the "Register of Births, Deaths & Marriage", Book 1, page 333) (1832–1855), who married a settler, a shepherd named Tom Adams, in January 1848 at the Registry Office in Waymouth Street. This was the first recorded official Aboriginal/settler marriage in the colony of South Australia.

== Today ==
Wellington Square is one of only two of Light's six squares, Whitmore Square being the other one, which still retain the original configuration, neither having been dissected by roads like the others. The square has jacaranda trees, roses, and cherry trees, and the walking trail around the perimeter is about 700 metres (770 yd).
