= Cecil Graham =

Australian rules footballer

Cecil Wallace Graham (1911–1994) was an Australian rules football player in South Australia. He was also the father, grandfather, and relative of several other footballers.

== Early life ==
Cecil Wallace Graham was born in 1911, and is a descendant of Kudnarto, a Kaurna woman famous for having made legal history by being the first Aboriginal Australian woman to marry a European settler in the colony of South Australia in 1848.

Graham grew up at Point Pearce mission on the Yorke Peninsula.

== Career ==
Graham was an Australian rules football player who played A grade football at the mission, playing as a full-forward.

He played for Central District Football Club in the South Australian National Football League (SANFL).

Graham was a member of the 1983 Indigenous All-Stars team.

== Personal life and death ==
Graham married Doris May Edwards (28 March 1912-2004), who was also born at Point Pearce, in 1930. They had 15 children. He died in 1994. Doris, a Kaurna woman, was well-known in her own right, and her 90th birthday party was held in Adelaide Town Hall and attended by premier of South Australia Mike Rann in 2002. She was believed to be the oldest Kaurna woman still alive at that time. Her great-great-grandfather, on her mother's side was Thomas Adams, who married Kudnarto.

== Family ==
Graham and Doris were the parents of Rex ("Curra"), Fred (Tonga), Bradley Graham (the oldest three sons), and also well-known Sturt footballer Michael Graham. All of the boys played football. Their eldest daughter was May, later May Turner.

Graham and his wife Doris wrote about their family history in As We've Known It: 1911 to the Present, published in 1987 by the South Australian College of Advanced Education. In it, they relate that Sturt coach Jack Oatey and general manager Vic O'Donnell asked Michael to move to Adelaide and play for the club. Doris and Cecil moved the whole family to Adelaide to support their son's football career, and Michael attended college in Adelaide.

Bradley Graham won a Mail Medal in the Mid North. Bradley's son, Phillip (Phil) Graham, played in the SANFL, as did his brothers Colin Graham, and Brenton. was their uncle. Brenton won a Tomkins Medal in 1978 in the SANFL under-19, but developed problems with his knee and was only able to play 10 senior games, all in the early 1980s.

Phil, Colin, and Michael were also members of the 1983 Indigenous All-Stars team. Colin (born 1958) played with Melbourne in the Victorian Football League (VFL).

Phil and Brenton's sister Debra is the mother of AFL premiership players Troy Bond and Shane Bond.

Cecil Graham was the father-in-law of former Collingwood and later (2014) Perth Football Club player Leon Davis.

In 2003, there was a Cecil Graham coaching Glandore Football Club, in division four amateur football, who had played for Sturt Football Club. (Note: Relationship unknown. Could this one be a son?)
