= Michael Graham (footballer) =

Australian rules footballer

Personal information
- Nickname: The Flash
- Born: 11 January 1952 (age 74); Wallaroo, Australia
- Position: Forward player

Playing career
Years	Club	Games (Goals)
1969–1987	St Mary's	230
1971–1987	Sturt	282 (455)
Total		512 (455)

Representative team honours
Years	Team	Games (Goals)
	South Australia	11

Career highlights
- Sturt premiership player 1974, 1976; St Mary's premiership player: 1978–79, 1983–84, 1985–86; Nichols Medal: 1973–74; Chaney Medal: 1978–79; St Mary's best and fairest: 1969–70, 1973–74; Sturt Team of the Century; South Australian Football Hall of Fame: 2002; Indigenous Team of the Century: 2005; NT Team of the Century: 2016; Australian Football Hall of Fame: 2024

Michael Wayne Graham (born 11 January 1952) is a former Australian rules footballer. He played with Sturt in the South Australian National Football League (SANFL) and St Mary's in the Northern Territory Football League (NTFL) during the 1970s and 1980s.

He was inducted into the Australian Football Hall of Fame in 2024.

== Early life and education ==
Michael Wayne Graham was born on 11 January 1952, in Wallaroo, into an Aboriginal Australian family living in the Point Pearce mission on the Yorke Peninsula in South Australia. The second youngest of 15 children,his father was Cecil Graham (1911–1994), who played for Central District in the SANFL, and his mother Doris May Edwards (1912-2004).

In a book about their family history, As We've Known It: 1911 to the Present (1987) his parents Cecil and Doris relate that Sturt coach Jack Oatey and general manager Vic O'Donnell asked Michael to move to Adelaide and play for the club. Doris and Cecil moved the whole family to Adelaide to support their son's football career, and Michael attended college in Adelaide.

His three elder brothers, Rex ("Curra"), Fred (Tonga), Bradley Graham also played football, as did his nephews (Bradley's sons) Phillip (Phil) Graham and Colin Graham.

== Career ==
Before beginning his career with Sturt, Graham played for the Penola Eagles, in Penola, South Australia. Graham was awarded the 1970 Western Border Medal (for the association's best and fairest player), after the Penola Eagles had finished third over the previous two seasons.

A half-forward flanker nicknamed "The Flash" for his great speed, Graham made his SANFL debut for Sturt in 1971 (cap number 757) and went on to play 282 games over 15 seasons, kicking 455 goals. He was a premiership player in 1974 and 1976, under coach Jack Oatey, whom he later said was like a second father to him.

He also represented South Australia in interstate football on eleven occasions.

In the SANFL offseasons over summer, Graham played with St Mary's in the Northern Territory Football League (NTFL). He would play 230 matches for St Mary's across 17 seasons, winning premierships in 1978–79, 1983–84, and 1985–86. He would also be awarded the Chaney Medal as best on field in the 1978–79 NTFL Grand Final.

In 1983, was a member of the 1983 Indigenous All-Stars team, as were his father Cecil and nephews Phil and Colin Graham.

Following his retirement from playing, Graham would coach teams in the Northern Territory and other country leagues, also continuing to play masters football until the age of 72 in 2024.

== Recognition ==
Graham won the Nichols Medal in 1973-74 for the NTFL's best and fairest player.

In 2005 he was named on the interchange bench in the official Indigenous Team of the Century.

He is also a member of Sturt's "Team of the 20th Century" as well as the Northern Territory Team of the Century.

In 2024, Graham was inducted into the Australian Football Hall of Fame.
