= Tim Hughes (announcer) =

American sports announcer (born 1959)

- Born: June 9, 1959 (age 66); Boise, Idaho, U.S.
- Occupation: Voice talent / live event announcer
- Known for: "Can you feel it?" (catchphrase)
- Website: www.voicebyhughes.com

Tim Hughes (born 1959) is an American sports announcer and voice actor.

== Career ==
Hughes is a native of Pocatello, Idaho. He has trademarked the catchphrase he is most associated with, "Can you feel it?", following the pattern of ring announcer Michael Buffer who previously trademarked his own catchphrase, "Let's get ready to rumble!"

Following a layoff from Salt Lake City AM radio station KNRS in 2000, Hughes set up a recording studio in his own home, and created his own company "On the Spot Voiceovers".

=== Olympic Coverage ===
Hughes went on to serve as an announcer in several Olympic Games:

- 2002 Olympic Winter Games in Salt Lake City, Utah: English Voice for Medals Plaza
- 2004 Olympic Summer Games
- 2006 Olympic Winter Games
- 2008 Olympic Summer Games
