= Colin Graham (footballer, born 1958) =

Australian rules footballer

Personal information
- Full name: Colin Graham
- Born: 26 January 1958 (age 68)
- Original team: Penola (SA) / Kyabram (Vic.)
- Height: 180 cm (5 ft 11 in)
- Weight: 79 kg (174 lb)

Playing career^{1}
Years	Club	Games (Goals)
1975–78	Melbourne	35 (32)

Representative team honours^{2}
Years	Team	Games (Goals)
1983	Aboriginal All-Stars	1 (5)
- ^{1} Playing statistics correct to the end of 1978.^{2} Representative statistics correct as of 1983.

Colin Graham (born 26 January 1958) is a former Australian rules footballer from South Australia, who played with Melbourne in the Victorian Football League (VFL).

== Early life and family ==
Colin Graham was born on 26 January 1958 in South Australia, the son of Cecil Graham.

His grandfather was SANFL player Cecil Graham, his brothers are SANFL footballers Phil and Brenton (who had to retire early owing to a knee injury), and his uncle is Michael Graham, also an SANFL player. Through Cecil, they are all descendants of Kudnarto, a Kaurna woman famous for having made legal history by being the first Aboriginal Australian woman to marry a European settler in the colony of South Australia in 1848.

== Career ==
Graham first played with Penola in Penola, South Australia, before joining Kyabram Football Club in Victoria.

He then transferred to with Melbourne FC, a VFL team. He played 35 games, kicking 32 goals between 1975 and 1978.

He was also a member of the 1983 Indigenous All-Stars team, along with brother Phil and uncle, Michael.

Graham had a car accident which necessitated a year of rehabilitation that included having to play a helmet. After returning to SA, he played a season with Sturt Football Club in 1985, playing 15 SANFL games.
