= Royal Commission on the Aborigines (1913) =

Royal commission in South Australia

- Date: 1913–1916
- Location: South Australia, Australia
- Type: Royal commission
- Commissioners: William Angus (chair); James Jelley; John Lewis; George Ritchie; John Verran
- Appointed: 19 December 1912
- Outcome: Recommended government takeover of the Point Pearce and Point McLeay missions and favoured assimilation policies.
- Reports: Progress Report (1913) and Final Report (1916).

The Royal Commission on the Aborigines was a royal commission held in the state of South Australia to inform the government of the day on how best to deal with and look after the welfare of Aboriginal Australians in the colony. It began in 1913, handing down a progress report in October of that year, but continued its investigations in 1914 and only issued its final report in 1916.

== Background ==
The Royal Commission on the Aborigines was appointed by the South Australian Government on 19 December 1912 to inquire into and provide a report on "the control, organisation and management of the institutions in this [South Australia] set aside for the benefit of the aborigines". with other commissioners being James Jelley MLC, John Lewis MLC, George Ritcher MP, and John Verran. William Angus chaired the commission,

The commission heard evidence from 19 witnesses, including six Aboriginal people. It covered a range of topics, including employment and wages; health; education; "half-castes" (children of mixed descent); housing; freehold and leasehold land formerly held by Aborigines, various arrangements between the government and associations which worked for the benefit of Aboriginal people; and Aboriginal reserves. Opinions were heard n about the appropriate age at which children of mixed descent should be removed from their parents, with the secretary of the state Children's Council suggesting that they should be taken away as soon as they are born.

During 1913, the commissioners went to interview mission staff, board members, and Aboriginal residents at Point McLeay, Point Pearce, and Moonta missions and also took evidence from and pastoralists. The commission's progress report was handed down in October 1913 and included 26 recommendations, including that Point Pearce and Point McLeay missions be taken over by the government. During the following year, they also spoke to witnesses at Killapaninna and Koonibba Missions.

A final report was produced in October 1916. Among other recommendations, it suggested the government purchase of Koonibba and Killalpaninna missions. With regard to children being removed from their parents into the care of the state, the final report favoured what later became known as assimilation for people of mixed descent, rather than segregation.

As a result of the commission's recommendations, the government took over Point Pearce and Point McLeay missions. It also recommended that all Aboriginal children be taken under government guardianship at age 10, to be placed "where they deem best".

The commission was widely reported on by the newspapers of the day in South Australia.
