= Nandini =

Nandhini
- Gender: Female
- Language: Sanskrit

Nandini is a South Asian female given name. It is derived from the Sanskrit verbal root nand, which means "to rejoice, delight". Literally, nandinī means a woman who brings joy. The name also specifically refers to a daughter, as a daughter brings joy to the family. In the Hindu religion, Goddess Parvati is often addressed by this name. Nandini also refers to one of the eight eternal companions (Ashtanayika) of Goddess Parvati.

== People ==
The following people named Nandini have articles on Wikipedia:

- Nandini Bhaktavatsala, Indian actress, won the National Film Award for Best Actress for her performance in the Kannada film, Kaadu
- Nandini Ghosal, Indian Bengali classical dancer and actress
- Nandini Goud (born 1967), painter and printmaker from Hyderabad, India
- Nandini Mundkur, Indian developmental paediatrician
- Nandini Muthuswamy, Carnatic violinist from South India
- Hamsa Nandini, Indian model, dancer, actress
- Nandini Nimbkar, American academic from India, current President of the Nimbkar Agricultural Research Institute (NARI)
- Nandini Rai (born 1988), Indian model and film actress
- Nandini Reddy, Indian film director
- Nandini Sidda Reddy, Telugu language writer and poet
- Nandini Sahu (born 1973), Indian poet
- Nandini Satpathy (1931–2006), Indian politician and author
- Rajesh Nandini Singh (born 1967), Indian politician in the Indian National Congress
- Nandini Srikar, Indian singer, composer and guitarist

=== Fictional character ===
- Nandini, a fictional Maurya queen in the TV series Chandra Nandini

== Other uses ==
- Nandini, a TV series that airs on Sun TV (India)
- Nandini (brand), an Indian dairy brand

== See also ==
- Nadini
- Nand (disambiguation)
- Nandakini
- Nandi (disambiguation)
- Nanini (disambiguation)
