= 1974 in British radio =

This is a list of events in British radio during 1974.

== Events ==
=== January ===
- No events.

=== February ===
- 19 February – BRMB begins broadcasting to the Birmingham area.

=== March ===
- 17 March – Solid Gold Sixty is broadcast on BBC Radio 1 for the final time. It is replaced the following week by a one-hour programme which just features the top 20.

=== April ===
- 1 April – BBC Radio Teesside is renamed BBC Radio Cleveland.
- 2 April – Piccadilly Radio begins broadcasting to the Manchester area.

=== May to June ===
- No events.

=== July ===
- 15 July – Metro Radio begins broadcasting to the Newcastle upon Tyne area.

=== August ===
- 30/31 August – Radio North Sea International ceases broadcasting to the UK at midnight.

=== September ===
- American-born music presenter Paul Gambaccini makes his first broadcasts on British radio, initially on BBC Radio 1.
- 30 September – Swansea Sound, the first Independent Local Radio station in Wales, begins broadcasting to the Swansea area.

=== October ===
- 1 October – Radio Hallam begins broadcasting to the Sheffield area.
- 21 October – Radio City begins broadcasting to the Liverpool area.

=== November ===
- 22 November – The first regular programme in the UK for the black community, Black Londoners, launches on BBC Radio London, presented by Alex Pascall. The programme is initially launched as a trial run of six programmes before becoming a weekly, and from 1978, a weeknight, fixture in the schedules.

=== December ===
- No events.

=== Unknown ===
- BBC Radio Leicester launches a weekly programme for the Asian community.

== Station debuts ==
- 19 February – BRMB
- 2 April – Piccadilly Radio
- 17 April – Hospital Radio Lynn
- 15 July – Metro Radio
- 30 September – Swansea Sound
- 1 October – Radio Hallam
- 21 October – Radio City

== Programme debuts ==
- 20 April – The Betty Witherspoon Show on BBC Radio 2 (1974)
- 11 August – Listen to Les on BBC Radio 2 (1974–1985)
- 22 November – Black Londoners on BBC Radio London (1974–1988)

== Continuing radio programmes ==
=== 1940s ===
- Sunday Half Hour (1940–2018)
- Desert Island Discs (1942–Present)
- Down Your Way (1946–1992)
- Letter from America (1946–2004)
- Woman's Hour (1946–Present)
- A Book at Bedtime (1949–Present)

=== 1950s ===
- The Archers (1950–Present)
- The Today Programme (1957–Present)
- The Navy Lark (1959–1977)
- Sing Something Simple (1959–2001)
- Your Hundred Best Tunes (1959–2007)

=== 1960s ===
- Farming Today (1960–Present)
- In Touch (1961–Present)
- The Men from the Ministry (1962–1977)
- Petticoat Line (1965–1979)
- The World at One (1965–Present)
- The Official Chart (1967–Present)
- Just a Minute (1967–Present)
- The Living World (1968–Present)
- The Organist Entertains (1969–2018)

=== 1970s ===
- PM (1970–Present)
- Start the Week (1970–Present)
- Week Ending (1970–1998)
- You and Yours (1970–Present)
- I'm Sorry I Haven't a Clue (1972–Present)
- Good Morning Scotland (1973–Present)
- Hello Cheeky (1973–1979)
- Kaleidoscope (1973–1998)
- Newsbeat (1973–Present)

== Births ==
- 15 January – Edith Bowman, Scottish music critic, radio disc jockey and television presenter
- 22 February – Chris Moyles, disc jockey
- 28 March – Scott Mills, disc jockey
- 24 April
  - Jon Holmes, writer, comedian and broadcaster
  - David Vitty (Comedy Dave), radio presenter
- 26 April – Adil Ray, broadcaster and comic actor
- 28 April – Vernon Kay, broadcast presenter
- 21 June – Natasha Desborough, radio presenter
- 24 June – Rob da Bank, disc jockey
- 2 July – Dan Tetsell, comedy writer-performer
- 14 July – David Mitchell, comedy writer-performer
- 24 July – Lisa Francesca Nand, journalist and broadcaster
- 2 August – Phil Williams, radio news presenter
- 6 October – Andy Zaltzman, satirical and cricket broadcaster
- 24 November – Stephen Merchant, comedy writer-performer and radio presenter
- 13 December – Sara Cox, disc jockey
- Ros Atkins, broadcast journalist
- Natalie Haynes, broadcaster, classicist, comedian and writer

== Deaths ==
- 23 February – Raymond Glendenning, radio sports commentator (born 1907)
- 4 May – Ludwig Koch, German-born British natural sound recordist (born 1881)

== See also ==
- 1974 in British music
- 1974 in British television
- 1974 in the United Kingdom
- List of British films of 1974
