= Amal Galal Sabry =

Emirati autism advocate

Amal Galal Sabry is an advocate for people with autism who lives in the United Arab Emirates (UAE). Sabry is the founder and manager of the Emirates Autism Center, the first foundation to support people with autism in the UAE.

== Biography ==
Sabry began to work with Autistic children in 1992 after her own son, Amr, was diagnosed as being on the Autism spectrum. Sabry and her husband went to the United States to visit the Boston League School in order to create an early intervention plan for her son. In 2001, Amr became the first autistic child in the UAE to be integrated into the school system. Later, Amr went on to become the first person with autism to graduate from high school.

In 2007, she founded the Emirates Autism Center in order to help improve the quality of life for people with autism and their families. The center is the first Autism foundation in the UAE. More than half of the students of the center have been integrated into public schools since the founding of the organization.

Sabry was honored with the Humanitarian Award of the Emirates Woman, Woman of the Year Awards in 2016. She was the first Egyptian to win this award.
