= Lifestart =

Lifestart is an Australian registered charity that provides early intervention and school age years inclusion support programs and supports to children and young people 0 – 24 years living with disability or developmental delay.

== History ==
Lifestart began in 1996 when eight families whose children attended the Macquarie University Early Intervention program decided to set up an Early Childhood Intervention service which would be a model of best practice in service provision and family support. They won a tender from the NSW state government which allowed them to set up a small service in Turramurra, and was later named the model program for the state of NSW. The service now covers the Sydney metropolitan area as well as the Illawarra and Shoalhaven, and the Blue Mountains. Lifestart has been funded by the NSW Department of Ageing, Disability and Home Care, the NSW Department of Education and Training, and is now a registered NDIS provider. Lifestart is a registered charity and relies on donations for some programs.

== Services ==
A Lifestart team can provide speech therapy, occupational therapy, physiotherapy, psychology, early intervention, social welfare, transition to school and high school, community inclusion and school support.

Services are provided within the home, the child’s school or daycare, at one of Lifestart’s centres, or within the community (e.g. supporting inclusion into a swimming program). One of the most important programs is Open Playgroup, a weekly playgroup where parents can meet together and support one another while their children are supported in play by trained staff. This playgroup is open to members of the community and families on the waiting list as well as Lifestart members.

Lifestart uses a "key worker" approach, which assigns a specific allied health worker to be the principal point of contact for each family. .
