= List of MPs elected in the 1974 United Kingdom general election =

List of MPs elected in the 1974 United Kingdom general election may refer to the results of either of two elections that year:

- List of MPs elected in the February 1974 United Kingdom general election
- List of MPs elected in the October 1974 United Kingdom general election

== See also ==
- 1974 United Kingdom general election
