= List of UK top-ten albums in 1974 =

The UK Albums Chart is one of many music charts compiled by the Official Charts Company that calculates the best-selling albums of the week in the United Kingdom. Before 2004, the chart was only based on the sales of physical albums. This list shows albums that peaked in the Top 10 of the UK Albums Chart during 1974, as well as albums which peaked in 1973 and 1975 but were in the top 10 in 1974. The entry date is when the album appeared in the top ten for the first time (week ending, as published by the Official Charts Company, which is six days after the chart is announced).

The first new number-one album of the year was by Tales from Topographic Oceans by Yes. Overall, twenty different albums peaked at number one in 1974, with Elton John and Mike Oldfield (2) having the joint most albums hit that position.

== Top-ten albums ==
Key

Symbol	Meaning
‡	Album peaked in 1972 or 1973 but still in chart in 1974.
♦	Album released in 1974 but peaked in 1975.
Entered	The date that the album first appeared in the chart.
Peak	Highest position that the album reached in the UK Albums Chart.

Entered (week ending)	Weeks in top 10	Single	Artist	Peak	Peak reached (week ending)	Weeks at peak
Albums in 1972
22 July 1972	59	Simon and Garfunkel's Greatest Hits ‡	Simon & Garfunkel	2	29 July 1972	3
Albums in 1973
31 March 1973	42	The Dark Side of the Moon ‡	Pink Floyd	2	31 March 1973	1
5 May 1973	17	1967-1970 (The Blue Album) ‡	The Beatles	2	12 May 1973	3
16 June 1973	6	Touch Me ‡	Gary Glitter	2	16 June 1973	1
7 July 1973	44	And I Love You So	Perry Como	1	26 January 1974	1
21 July 1973	22	Now & Then ‡	The Carpenters	2	15 September 1973	1
1 September 1973	74	Tubular Bells	Mike Oldfield	1	5 October 1974	1
8 September 1973	4	Touch Me in the Morning ‡	Diana Ross	7	22 September 1973	1
8 September 1973	4	Innervisions	Stevie Wonder	8	27 April 1974	1
6 October 1973	13	Sladest ‡	Slade	1	6 October 1973	4
13 October 1973	16	I'm a Writer, Not a Fighter ‡	Gilbert O'Sullivan	2	20 October 1973	2
3 November 1973	13	Pin Ups ‡	David Bowie	1	3 November 1973	5
3 November 1973	25	Goodbye Yellow Brick Road ‡	Elton John	1	22 December 1973	2
1 December 1973	7	Dreams Are Nuthin' More Than Wishes ‡	David Cassidy	1	15 December 1973	1
1 December 1973	8	Stranded ‡	Roxy Music	1	8 December 1973	1
8 December 1973	4	Rock On ‡	David Essex	7	8 December 1973	1
22 December 1973	5	A Time for Us	Donny Osmond	4	5 January 1974	1
22 December 1973	49	Band on the Run	Paul McCartney & Wings	1	27 July 1974	7
22 December 1973	5	Tales from Topographic Oceans	Yes	1	5 January 1974	2
Albums in 1974
5 January 1974	4	Brain Salad Surgery	Emerson, Lake & Palmer	2	5 January 1974	2
26 January 1974	7	Silverbird	Leo Sayer	2	2 February 1974	1
2 February 1974	64	The Singles: 1969–1973	The Carpenters	1	2 February 1974	17
2 February 1974	3	Coast to Coast: Overture and Beginners	Faces	3	9 February 1974	1
9 February 1974	7	Solitaire	Andy Williams	3	16 February 1974	1
23 February 1974	9	Old New Borrowed and Blue	Slade	1	2 March 1974	1
2 March 1974	2	Planet Waves	Bob Dylan	3	2 March 1974	1
2 March 1974	1	Harbour	Jack Jones	10	2 March 1974	1
9 March 1974	4	Burn	Deep Purple	3	9 March 1974	1
16 March 1974	1	Slaughter on 10th Avenue	Mick Ronson	9	16 March 1974	1
23 March 1974	2	The Free Story	Free	2	23 March 1974	1
23 March 1974	2	The Untouchable	Alvin Stardust	4	23 March 1974	1
23 March 1974	9	Millican and Nesbitt	Millican & Nesbitt	3	6 April 1974	1
30 March 1974	4	Queen II	Queen	5	6 April 1974	1
30 March 1974	1	Ma! He's Making Eyes at Me	Lena Zavaroni	8	30 March 1974	1
6 April 1974	7	Diana & Marvin	Diana Ross and Marvin Gaye	6	6 April 1974	4
6 April 1974	2	Glen Campbell's Greatest Hits	Glen Campbell	8	13 April 1974	1
13 April 1974	5	Buddha and the Chocolate Box	Cat Stevens	3	20 April 1974	1
13 April 1974	7	The Sting: Original Soundtrack	Marvin Hamlisch	7	13 April 1974	1
4 May 1974	6	Behind Closed Doors	Charlie Rich	4	25 May 1974	1
18 May 1974	6	Quo	Status Quo	2	18 May 1974	1
25 May 1974	12	Journey to the Centre of the Earth	Rick Wakeman	1	25 May 1974	1
1 June 1974	1	By Your Side	Peters and Lee	9	1 June 1974	1
1 June 1974	4	Scotland Scotland	The Scotland World Cup Squad with a little help from their friends	3	8 June 1974	1
8 June 1974	8	Diamond Dogs	David Bowie	1	8 June 1974	4
8 June 1974	11	Kimono My House	Sparks	4	22 June 1974	2
15 June 1974	6	Bad Company	Bad Company	3	22 June 1974	1
29 June 1974	2	The Way We Were	Andy Williams	7	29 June 1974	1
29 June 1974	6	Remember Me This Way	Gary Glitter	5	6 July 1974	1
6 July 1974	1	Between Today and Yesterday	Alan Price	9	6 July 1974	1
13 July 1974	7	Caribou	Elton John	1	13 July 1974	2
20 July 1974	14	Another Time, Another Place	Bryan Ferry	4	10 August 1974	4
20 July 1974	1	Before the Flood	Bob Dylan and The Band	8	20 July 1974	1
10 August 1974	1	Cassidy Live!	David Cassidy	9	10 August 1974	1
17 August 1974	4	Fulfillingness' First Finale	Stevie Wonder	5	17 August 1974	3
17 August 1974	2	Solo Concert	Billy Connolly	8	17 August 1974	1
24 August 1974	7	461 Ocean Boulevard	Eric Clapton	3	31 August 1974	1
24 August 1974	2	Welcome Back, My Friends, to the Show That Never Ends ～ Ladies and Gentlemen	Emerson, Lake & Palmer	6	31 August 1974	1
31 August 1974	4	Our Best to You	The Osmonds	5	7 September 1974	1
7 September 1974	10	Back Home Again	John Denver	3	5 October 1974	1
7 September 1974	3	The Psychomodo	Cockney Rebel	8	14 September 1974	2
14 September 1974	7	Hergest Ridge	Mike Oldfield	1	14 September 1974	3
28 September 1974	3	Rainbow	Peters and Lee	6	28 September 1974	2
5 October 1974	3	Sheet Music	10cc	9	5 October 1974	1
5 October 1974	4	Mud Rock ♦	Mud	8	18 January 1975	1
12 October 1974	29	Rollin'	Bay City Rollers	1	12 October 1974	4
19 October 1974	6	Smiler	Rod Stewart	1	19 October 1974	2
19 October 1974	1	A Tapestry of Dreams	Charles Aznavour	9	19 October 1974	1
26 October 1974	2	Walls and Bridges	John Lennon	6	26 October 1974	1
26 October 1974	4	Just a Boy	Leo Sayer	4	2 November 1974	1
26 October 1974	1	Odds & Sods	The Who	10	26 October 1974	1
2 November 1974	3	It's Only Rock 'n Roll	The Rolling Stones	2	9 November 1974	1
2 November 1974	1	A Stranger In My Own Back Yard	Gilbert O'Sullivan	9	2 November 1974	1
9 November 1974	15	David Essex	David Essex	2	14 December 1974	4
9 November 1974	16	Can't Get Enough	Barry White	4	23 November 1974	3
16 November 1974	3	David Live	David Bowie	2	16 November 1974	1
23 November 1974	22	Elton John's Greatest Hits	Elton John	1	23 November 1974	11
23 November 1974	12	Sheer Heart Attack	Queen	2	30 November 1974	1
23 November 1974	2	Propaganda	Sparks	9	23 November 1974	2
30 November 1974	3	Country Life	Roxy Music	3	30 November 1974	1
30 November 1974	1	Stormbringer	Deep Purple	6	30 November 1974	1
7 December 1974	2	Showaddywaddy	Showaddywaddy	9	7 December 1974	1
7 December 1974	1	The Lamb Lies Down on Broadway	Genesis	10	7 December 1974	1
14 December 1974	3	Slade in Flame	Slade	6	14 December 1974	1
21 December 1974	4	Relayer	Yes	4	21 December 1974	2

== See also ==
- 1974 in British music
- List of number-one albums from the 1970s (UK)
