= 1974 in British television =

This is a list of British television related events from 1974.

== Events ==
=== January ===
- 3 January – BBC1 shows the first episode of the Second World War-set comedy series It Ain't Half Hot Mum starring Windsor Davies.
- 5 January
  - Debut of the Saturday morning children's show Tiswas, hosted by Chris Tarrant. The series starts as a local programme in the Midlands (on ATV) but is not shown on most ITV stations until October 1979 (with Tyne Tees and Ulster broadcasting in 1981, but never in the Channel Islands). It would run until 1982.
  - Due to the ongoing overtime ban by the National Union of Mineworkers, strike action in the electricity supply industry and effects of the 1973 oil crisis which have led to a Three-Day Week, the government orders both the BBC and ITV television services to resume early closedowns each night at 10:30pm to save electricity. The early closedowns will later alternate each day between the BBC and ITV. They would end on Friday 8 February following calling of the February 1974 United Kingdom general election.
- 7 January
  - A two-minute mid-afternoon regional news summary is broadcast on BBC1 for the first time. It is transmitted immediately before the start of the afternoon's children's programmes.
  - ITV launches the long-running travel show Wish You Were Here...? hosted by Judith Chalmers. It would run until 2003.
- 30 January – BBC2 shows the first early morning Open University programming, airing between 6:40am and 7:30am.

=== February ===
- 12 February – BBC1 first airs the children's series Bagpuss, made by Peter Firmin and Oliver Postgate's Smallfilms in stop-motion animation. Despite just 13 episodes being made, it becomes fondly remembered and gains a huge cult following.
- 18 February – The American depression era family drama series The Waltons makes its UK debut on BBC2.
- 22 February – BBC2 was supposed to air the drama Girl as part of its Second City Firsts anthology series. The drama which tells the story of an affair between two army officers, is the first on British television to feature a gay kiss between two women. However it was replaced at the last minute by a Party Political Broadcast by The Conservative Party in the run up to General Election scheduled for the 28th February 1974. The episode was instead shown three days later on the 25th February 1974.
- February – The fifth of the five experimental community cable television channels, Wellingborough Cablevision, begins broadcasting.

=== March ===
- 31 March – Charlie Williams hosts his final edition of The Golden Shot. The show's original host, Bob Monkhouse, would return in July.

=== April ===
- 6 April – The 19th Eurovision Song Contest is held at the Brighton Dome, produced and transmitted by the BBC. Katie Boyle hosts the event for the fourth time. Sweden wins the contest with the song "Waterloo", performed (in English) by ABBA who become the first group to win the contest and go on to achieve huge international success.
- April – The Annan Committee on the future of broadcasting is established to discuss the United Kingdom broadcasting industry, including new technologies and their funding, the role and funding of the BBC, Independent Broadcasting Authority and programme standards.

=== May ===
- 9 May – BBC1 launches the sitcom Happy Ever After, starring Terry Scott and June Whitfield

=== June ===
- 8 June – Jon Pertwee makes his final regular appearance as the Third Doctor in the concluding moments of Part Six of the Doctor Who serial Planet of the Spiders. Tom Baker briefly appears as the Fourth Doctor at the conclusion of the serial.

=== July ===
- 14 July – Bob Monkhouse returns as host of ATV gameshow The Golden Shot after he was fired in January 1972 for allegedly taking bribes.
- 29 July – Coronation Street introduces the character Gail Potter, played by Helen Worth, who will remain in the show for 50 years.

=== August ===
- 5 August – For the first time on a pre-school children's programme, the show Inigo Pipkin covers the death of the main character, Inigo, as the actor who played him (George Woodbridge) has died. The show is renamed Pipkins. This predates the Mr. Hooper death episode of Sesame Street by nine years.
- 24 August – BBC1 begins airing the American police series Kojak, starring Telly Savalas as the titular character.
- 31 August – Star Trek: The Animated Series debuts on BBC1.

=== September ===
- 2 September – ITV launches the sitcom Rising Damp starring Leonard Rossiter and Richard Beckinsale.
- 5 September
  - ITV shows the feature-length pilot episode of The Six Million Dollar Man, starring Lee Majors as the half-man, half-cyborg action hero Steve Austin.
  - Following the pilot shown in April 1973, BBC1 commences with the Ronnie Barker prison comedy series Porridge.
- 9 September – John Craven's Newsround expands to four days a week. Previously, the programme had aired only on Tuesdays and Thursdays.
- 23 September
  - The BBC teletext service Ceefax goes live with 30 pages of information.
  - BBC Schools starts broadcasting programmes in colour.

=== October ===
- 13 October – ITV begins airing the American science fiction series Planet of the Apes, based on the successful film franchise and starring Roddy McDowall.
- 16 October – The Welsh language soap Pobol y Cwm makes its debut on BBC Wales. There was also a daytime screening on BBC1 only for viewers in England later in the week.
- 21 October – BBC1 airs the first episode of the children's animated series Roobarb, featuring Roobarb the green dog and Custard the pink cat.

=== December ===
- 5 December – "Party Political Broadcast", the final episode of Monty Python's Flying Circus is broadcast on BBC2.
- 24 December – ITV Anglia screens the 1966 Batman movie, several years before other regions (ATV Midlands 9 April 1977, Thames and Granada 29 August 1977 and HTV 29 August 1978). However, the film has already been broadcast in the UK on Tyne Tees (28 August 1972 and 3 January 1974).
- 25 December – Christmas Day film premiere on BBC of the 1969 western adventure True Grit, starring John Wayne. There is no Morecambe and Wise Christmas show this year because of Eric Morecambe's health, but the pair feature on a Michael Parkinson show.
- 26 December – Boxing Day highlights on BBC1 are the network premieres of the blockbuster films Chitty Chitty Bang Bang, starring Dick Van Dyke and Sally Ann Howes and the 1960 Western The Magnificent Seven, starring Yul Brynner, Steve McQueen and Charles Bronson.
- 28 December
  - Tom Baker makes his first full appearance as the Fourth Doctor in the Doctor Who serial Robot.
  - BBC 1 and 2 are rebranded with new logos and idents which both drop the word "colour":
    - BBC 1's mirror globe ident receives a facelift which changes the colour scheme from blue-on-black to gold-on-blue, removes the horizontal dividing line, and renders the channel name in white Futura Bold.
    - BBC 2 retires its cubed "2" symbol and replaces it with a "2" symbol made out of lines painted on horizontal discs that rotate in alternating directions.
- 31 December – Roger Hargreaves' Mr. Men animated series is first broadcast on BBC1. All 28 episodes are narrated by Arthur Lowe, with the first episode featuring Mr Happy. The series would be continually shown on the BBC until 1988.

=== Unknown ===
- ITV begins developing the ORACLE teletext service. Dates for its launch are unclear but it becomes popular around 1980.
- ITV begins broadcasting from Bluebell Hill transmitting station on the North Downs, initially for the London area franchisees.

== Debuts ==
=== BBC1 ===
- 3 January – It Ain't Half Hot Mum (1974–1981)
- 7 January – Tom's Midnight Garden (1974)
- 18 January – Heidi (1974)
- 20 January – John Halifax, Gentleman (1974)
- 28 January – Carrie's War (1974)
- 12 February – Bagpuss (1974)
- 20 February – Marty Back Together Again (1974)
- 15 March – Fall of Eagles (1974)
- 3 April
  - The Family (1974)
  - Shoulder to Shoulder (1974)
- 4 April
  - Barnaby Jones (1973–1980)
  - Seven Little Australians (1973)
- 9 April – The Electric Company (1971–1977)
- 10 April – The Prince of Denmark (1974)
- 17 April – No Strings (1974)
- 9 May – Happy Ever After (1974–1978)
- 20 May – Dial M for Murder (1974)
- 24 May – The Small World of Samuel Tweet (1974–1975)
- 9 July – Wodehouse Playhouse (1974–1978)
- 24 August – Kojak (1973–1978)
- 31 August
  - Football Focus (1974–1988, 1992–2026)
  - Star Trek: The Animated Series (1973–1974)
- 5 September – Porridge (1974–1977)
- 7 October – The Case of Eliza Armstrong (1974)
- 21 October – Roobarb (1974 BBC, 2005–2013 Channel 5)
- 20 October – Heidi (1974)
- 23 October – Second Time Around (1974–1975)
- 13 November – The Chinese Puzzle (1974)
- 22 November – Ken Dodd's World of Laughter (1974–1976)
- 1 December
  - David Copperfield (1974)
  - The Gathering Storm (1974)
- 4 December – Francis Durbridge Presents: Melissa (1974)
- 20 December – Churchill's People (1974–1975)
- 31 December – Mr. Men (1974–1978, 1983–1988 reruns with Little Miss)
- Unknown – Simon in the Land of Chalk Drawings (1974–1976)

=== BBC2 ===
- 19 January – The Pallisers (1974)
- 18 February – The Waltons (1972–1981)
- 3 March – Bedtime Stories (1974)
- 5 March – The Lady from the Sea (1974)
- 13 March – BBC2 Playhouse (1974–1982)
- 21 April – The Carnforth Practice (1974)
- 22 April – Masquerade (1974)
- 14 July – The Double Dealers (1974)
- 17 August – The Haggard Falcon (1974)
- 15 September – Network (1974–1980) (Anthology)
- 18 September – Microbes and Men (1974)
- 24 September – Look and Read: Cloud Burst (1974)
- 3 November – Notorious Woman (1974)
- 9 November – Cakes and Ale (1974)
- 17 November – The End of the Pier Show (1974–1976)
- 19 November – Rhoda (1974–1978)
- 30 November – The Early Life of Stephen Hind (1974)
- 1 December – A Day with Dana (1974–1975)
- 19 December – One-Upmanship (1974–1978)
- 28 December – An Unofficial Rose (1974–1975)

=== ITV ===
- 4 January – Within These Walls (1974–1978)
- 5 January – Tiswas (1974–1982)
- 7 January – Wish You Were Here...? (1974–2003, 2008)
- 16 January – Hold the Front Page (1974)
- 25 February – Zodiac (1974)
- 3 March – Not On Your Nellie (1974–1975)
- 5 March – Napoleon and Love (1974)
- 10 March – Death or Glory Boy (1974)
- 16 March – Who Killed Lamb? (1974)
- 24 March – Boy Dominic (1974; 1976)
- 5 April
  - The Aweful Mr. Goodall (1974)
  - The Zoo Gang (1974)
- 9 April – A Little Bit of Wisdom (1974–1976)
- 13 April – The Wheeltappers and Shunters Social Club (1974–1977)
- 14 April – Catholics: A Fable of the Future (1974)
- 21 April
  - Childhood (1974)
  - Doctor at Sea (1974)
- 22 April – My Name Is Harry Worth (1974)
- 1 May – ...And Mother Makes Five (1974–1976)
- 3 May – My Old Man (1974–1975)
- 13 May – Skiboy (1974)
- 24 May – Funny Ha-Ha (1974)
- 28 May – Armchair Cinema (1974–1975)
- 1 June – Thick as Thieves (1974)
- 2 June – Seven Faces of Woman (1974)
- 29 June – Moody and Pegg (1974–1975)
- 8 July –The Squirrels (1974–1977)
- 9 July – The Capone Investment (1974)
- 10 July
  - Julie on Sesame Street (1973)
  - Late Night Drama (1974–1975)
- 15 July – Soldier and Me (1974)
- 16 July – Village Hall (1974–1975)
- 24 July – How's Your Father? (1974–1975)
- 27 July
  - Don't Drink the Water (1974–1975)
  - Good Girl (1974)
  - Vicky the Viking (1974–1975)
- 28 July – Antony and Cleopatra (1974)
- 4 August – The Nearly Man (1974–1975)
- 15 August – The Inheritors (1974)
- 1 September – Occupations (1974)
- 2 September – Rising Damp (1974–1978)
- 5 September – The Six Million Dollar Man (1973–1978)
- 13 September – The Russell Harty Show (1974–1983)
- 15 September
  - The Top Secret Life of Edgar Briggs (1974)
  - Miss Nightingale (1974)
- 16 September – South Riding (1974)
- 20 September – Intimate Strangers (1974)
- 23 September – Badger's Set (1974)
- 24 September – King Lear (1974)
- 26 September – Father Brown (1974)
- 29 September – Affairs of the Heart (1974–1975)
- 30 September – Oh No It's Selwyn Froggitt (1974–1978)
- 2 October – Going a Bundle (1974–1976)
- 4 October – No, Honestly (1974–1975)
- 8 October – Graceless Go I (1974)
- 13 October – Planet of the Apes (1974–1975)
- 22 October – Jennie: Lady Randolph Churchill (1974)
- 5 November
  - Jennie (1974)
  - Rooms (1974–1977)
- 6 November – Rogue's Rock (1974–1976)
- 13 November – Follow That Dog (1974)
- 31 December – The Canterville Ghost (1974)
- Unknown – Don't Ask Me (1974–1978)

== Continuing television shows ==
=== 1920s ===
- BBC Wimbledon (1927–1939, 1946–2019, 2021–present)

=== 1930s ===
- Trooping the Colour (1937–1939, 1946–2019, 2023–present)
- The Boat Race (1938–1939, 1946–2019, 2021–present)
- BBC Cricket (1939, 1946–1999, 2020–2024)

=== 1950s ===
- Come Dancing (1950–1998)
- Watch with Mother (1952–1975)
- The Good Old Days (1953–1983)
- Panorama (1953–present)
- Dixon of Dock Green (1955–1976)
- Crackerjack (1955–1970, 1972–1984, 2020–2021)
- Opportunity Knocks (1956–1978, 1987–1990)
- This Week (1956–1978, 1986–1992)
- Armchair Theatre (1956–1974)
- What the Papers Say (1956–2008)
- The Sky at Night (1957–present)
- Blue Peter (1958–present)
- Grandstand (1958–2007)

=== 1960s ===
- Coronation Street (1960–present)
- Songs of Praise (1961–present)
- Z-Cars (1962–1978)
- Animal Magic (1962–1983)
- Doctor Who (1963–1989, 1996, 2005–present)
- World in Action (1963–1998)
- Top of the Pops (1964–2006)
- Match of the Day (1964–present)
- Crossroads (1964–1988, 2001–2003)
- Play School (1964–1988)
- Mr. and Mrs. (1965–1999)
- Call My Bluff (1965–2005)
- World of Sport (1965–1985)
- Jackanory (1965–1996, 2006)
- Sportsnight (1965–1997)
- It's a Knockout (1966–1982, 1999–2001)
- The Money Programme (1966–2010)
- The Golden Shot (1967–1975)
- Playhouse (1967–1982)
- Reksio (1967–1990)
- Dad's Army (1968–1977)
- Magpie (1968–1980)
- The Big Match (1968–2002)
- The Benny Hill Show (1969–1989)
- Nationwide (1969–1983)
- Screen Test (1969–1984)

=== 1970s ===
- The Goodies (1970–1982)
- Upstairs, Downstairs (1971–1975, 2010–2012)
- Bless This House (1971–1976)
- The Onedin Line (1971–1980)
- The Old Grey Whistle Test (1971–1987)
- The Two Ronnies (1971–1987, 1991, 1996, 2005)
- Love Thy Neighbour (1972–1976)
- Clapperboard (1972–1982)
- Crown Court (1972–1984)
- Pebble Mill at One (1972–1986, 1991–1996)
- Are You Being Served? (1972–1985)
- Rainbow (1972–1992, 1994–1997)
- Emmerdale (1972–present)
- Newsround (1972–present)
- Weekend World (1972–1988)
- Pipkins (1973–1981)
- We Are the Champions (1973–1987)
- Last of the Summer Wine (1973–2010)
- That's Life! (1973–1994)

== Ending this year ==
- Unknown – Crystal Tipps and Alistair (1971–1974)
- 1 February – The Protectors (1972–1974)
- 1 April – Colditz (1972–1974)
- 6 May – Bagpuss (1974)
- 8 May – The World at War (1973–1974)
- 9 May – Special Branch (1969–1974)
- 9 July – Comedy Playhouse (1961–1974)
- 10 October – Clangers (1969–1974, 2015–present)
- 28 October – Sunday Night at the London Palladium (1955–1967, 1973–1974)
- 5 December – Monty Python's Flying Circus (1969–1974)
- 24 December – Whatever Happened to the Likely Lads? (1973–1974)
- 26 December – Steptoe and Son (1962–1965, 1970–1974)
- 31 December – Heidi (1974)

== Births ==
- 1 January – Clare Calbraith, actress
- 2 January – Karin Giannone, newsreader
- 12 January – Melanie Chisholm, English pop singer (Spice Girls)
- 15 January – Danny Cohen, television executive
- 30 January – Olivia Colman, actress
- 22 February – Chris Moyles, disc jockey
- 21 March – Ursula Holden-Gill, actress (Emmerdale)
- 11 April – Zöe Lucker, English actress
- 17 April – Victoria Beckham, English pop singer and fashion designer (Spice Girls)
- 24 April – David Vitty (Comedy Dave), radio and television host
- 26 April – Adil Ray – actor and presenter
- 28 April – Vernon Kay – television presenter
- 1 May – Tamzin Malleson, actress
- 8 May – Jon Tickle, English television host
- 27 May – Denise van Outen, actress and television presenter
- 9 July – Dani Behr, singer, actress and television presenter
- 14 July – David Mitchell, comedian and actor
- 31 July – Emilia Fox, English actress
- 21 August – Paul Chowdhry, comedian and actor
- 23 August – Ray Park, Scottish actor
- 17 October – Matthew Macfadyen, English actor
- 4 November – Louise Redknapp, English singer
- 11 December – Ben Shephard, television presenter
- 12 December – Steven Arnold, actor
- 13 December – Sara Cox, English television and radio presenter
- Unknown – Mark Dymond, actor

== Deaths ==
- 29 May – James MacTaggart, television producer
- 22 August – Jacob Bronowski, scientist and presenter (The Ascent of Man)

== See also ==
- 1974 in British music
- 1974 in British radio
- 1974 in the United Kingdom
- List of British films of 1974
