= Anthony Dawes =

English actor (1928–2021)

- Born: Anthony Cecil John Dawes; 10 February 1928; Felixstowe, Suffolk, England
- Died: 21 January 2021 (aged 92); Chelsea, London, England
- Occupation: Actor
- Spouse: Lesley

Anthony Cecil John Dawes (10 February 1928 – 21 January 2021) was an English character actor, who appeared in a number of roles in film, television and on stage during a career which spanned from 1951 to 2006.

== Life and career ==
Dawes was born in Felixstowe, Suffolk in February 1928. He graduated from the Royal Academy of Dramatic Art (RADA) in 1951. His roles on television included The Avengers, Fawlty Towers, Z-Cars and The Kenny Everett Television Show. He also had some minor film roles, including Barry Lyndon (1975).

He died in Chelsea, London in January 2021 at the age of 92 following a short illness. He was survived by his wife, Lesley, and his daughter, Stephanie.

== Selected filmography ==
- The Avengers (1967) [EPIC] - Silent Actor
- Z-Cars (1968–1972) – various roles
- Upstairs, Downstairs (1973) – Breeze
- Follow That Dog (1974) – Insp. Bridges
- Barry Lyndon (1975) – British soldier
- My Brother's Keeper (1975–1976) – Mr. Chivers
- The Dick Emery Show (1975–1981) – various roles
- Grange Hill (1979) – Mr. Golightly
- Fawlty Towers (1979) – Mr. Libson
- The Two Ronnies (1980)
- Yes Minister (1981) – Committee Chairman
- BBC2 Playhouse (1981–1982) – various roles
- Minder (1982) – Mr. Notting QC
- The Kenny Everett Television Show (1983) – various roles
- Who, Sir? Me, Sir? (1985) – Headmaster
- Never Come Back (1990, TV Series) – Embury
- Keeping Up Appearances (1991) – The Jeweller
- Hollyoaks (1996) – Mr. St. John Thomas
- Time Trumpet (2006)
