= 1974 in the United Kingdom =

Events from the year 1974 in the United Kingdom.

The year is marked by the Three-Day Week, two general elections, a state of emergency in Northern Ireland, extensive Provisional Irish Republican Army bombing of the British mainland, several large company collapses and major local government reorganisation.

== Incumbents ==
- Monarch – Elizabeth II
- Prime Minister
  - Edward Heath (Conservative) (until 4 March)
  - Harold Wilson (Labour) (starting 4 March)

== Events ==
=== January ===
- January – Britain enters its first post-war recession after statistics show that the economy contracted during the third and fourth quarters of last year.
- 1 January
  - New Year's Day is celebrated as a public holiday for the first time.
  - The Northern Ireland Power-sharing Executive is set up in Belfast.
- 1 January–7 March – The Three-Day Week is introduced by the Conservative Government as a measure to conserve electricity during the period of industrial action by coal miners.
- 25 January – The travel writer and royal biographer James Pope-Hennessy, 57, is murdered at his flat in Ladbroke Grove, London, by a gang of young men.

=== February ===
- 4 February – M62 coach bombing: A Provisional Irish Republican Army bomb planted on a coach carrying off-duty soldiers and their families kills 11. On 8 February the toll reaches 12 with the death in hospital of an 18-year-old soldier seriously injured in the bombing.
- 7 February
  - The Prime Minister, Edward Heath, calls a general election for 28 February in an attempt to end the dispute over the miners' strike. During the campaign, the Labour Party and Trades Union Congress agree a 'Social Contract' intended to produce wage restraint.
  - Grenada becomes independent of the United Kingdom.
- 12 February – BBC1 first airs the children's television series Bagpuss, made by Peter Firmin and Oliver Postgate's Smallfilms in stop motion animation. Despite only 13 episodes being made, it becomes fondly remembered and gains a cult following.
- 14 February
  - Bob Latchford, the Birmingham City centre forward, becomes Britain's most expensive footballer in a £350,000 move to Everton.
  - Opinion polls show the Conservative government in the lead.
- 27 February – Enoch Powell, the controversial Conservative MP who was dismissed from the shadow cabinet in 1968 for his "Rivers of Blood" speech opposing mass immigration, announces his resignation from the Conservative Party in protest against Edward Heath's decision to take Britain into the EEC.
- 28 February – The general election results in the first hung parliament since 1929, with the Conservative government having 297 seats – four fewer than Labour, who have 301 – and the largest number of votes. Prime Minister Edward Heath hopes to form a coalition with the Liberal Party in order to remain in power.

=== March ===
- 3 March – 180 Britons are among the dead when Turkish Airlines Flight 981 travelling from Paris to London crashes in a wood near Paris, killing all 346 passengers and crew on board.
- 4 March – Heath fails to convince the Liberals to form a coalition and announces his resignation as Prime Minister, paving the way for Harold Wilson to become Prime Minister for the second time as Labour forms a minority government.
- 6 March – The miners' strike comes to an end due an improved pay offer by the new Labour government.
- 7 March – The Three-Day Week comes to an end.
- 10 March – Ten miners die in a methane gas explosion at Golborne Colliery near Wigan, Lancashire.
- 11 March – Convicted armed robbers Kenneth Littlejohn and his brother Keith, who claim to be British spies in the Republic of Ireland, escape from Mountjoy Prison in Dublin.
- 15 March – Architect John Poulson is jailed for five years for corruption.
- 18 March – Oil embargo crisis: Most OPEC nations end a 5-month oil embargo against the United States, Europe and Japan.
- 20 March – Ian Ball fails in his attempt to kidnap HRH Princess Anne and her husband Captain Mark Phillips in The Mall, outside Buckingham Palace.
- 29 March – The government re-establishes direct rule over Northern Ireland after declaring a state of emergency.
- 31 March – British Airways becomes the unified brand for BOAC, BEA, Cambrian Airways and Northeast Airlines.

=== April ===
- April – The Soviet car maker Lada, founded four years ago as a result of an enterprise by Italian automotive giant Fiat, begins selling cars in the United Kingdom: its 1200 four-door saloon is based on the Fiat 124 and retails for £999 (equivalent to £7,648.51 in 2022). They would be sold in Britain until 1997.
- 1 April – The Local Government Act 1972 comes into effect in England and Wales, creating six new metropolitan counties and comprehensively redrawing the administrative map. The Act confirms the boundaries of Wales by including most of Newport and Monmouthshire in the new county of Gwent, and abolishes all the 13 counties created by the Statute of Rhuddlan and the Laws in Wales Acts 1535 and 1542 to create eight new counties. West Midlands metropolitan county is created, centred on the cities of Birmingham and Coventry as well as towns including Dudley, Wolverhampton, West Bromwich and Walsall, covering areas which were all previously in Staffordshire, Worcestershire or Warwickshire. Greater Manchester is also created, centred on the city of Manchester and taking in areas including Oldham, Rochdale and Stockport, which were previously in Lancashire or Cheshire. Merseyside is formed from the city of Liverpool along with neighbouring parts of Lancashire and Cheshire. Tyne and Wear is created from parts of Northumberland and County Durham. Cleveland is created from parts of Yorkshire and County Durham, and Humberside from parts of Yorkshire and Lincolnshire. The remaining parts of Yorkshire are divided into West Yorkshire, South Yorkshire and North Yorkshire. Avon is created from the city of Bristol and nearby areas which were previously in Gloucestershire and Somerset. The historic county of Sussex is divided into West Sussex and East Sussex. The historic counties of Cumberland and Westmorland are dissolved and merged to form Cumbria, which also takes in areas previously in Lancashire and Yorkshire.
- 6 April – The 19th Eurovision Song Contest is held at the Dome in Brighton, produced and transmitted by the BBC. Katie Boyle hosts the event for the fourth time. Sweden wins the contest with the song "Waterloo", performed by ABBA, who become the first group to win the contest and go on to achieve huge international success.
- 24 April – Leeds United win their second Football League First Division title.
- 27 April – Manchester United are relegated from the Football League First Division where they have played continuously since 1938. Their relegation is confirmed when they lose 1–0 at home to their neighbours City in the penultimate game of the league season and the only goal of the game comes from former United striker Denis Law.

=== May ===
- 1 May – Alf Ramsey, who guided the England national football team to victory in the 1966 FIFA World Cup, is dismissed by the Football Association after 11 years in charge.
- 2 May – The National Front gains more than 10% of the vote in several parts of London in council elections, but fails to net any councillors.
- 4 May – Liverpool win the FA Cup for the second time, beating Newcastle United 3–0 in the Wembley final, with Kevin Keegan scoring twice and Steve Heighway scoring the other goal.
- 6 May – Inauguration of full electric service on British Rail's West Coast Main Line through to Glasgow.
- 17 May – The Loyalist paramilitary Ulster Volunteer Force carries out the Dublin and Monaghan bombings in the Republic of Ireland, killing 34 people.
- 20 May – The Centre for Policy Studies, a Conservative social market think tank established by Keith Joseph, Margaret Thatcher and Alfred Sherman, holds its first meeting.
- 28 May – Power-sharing in the Northern Ireland Assembly collapses following a strike by unionists.
- 29 May – Television producer James MacTaggart, 46, dies unexpectedly of a heart attack before finishing the film Robinson Crusoe.

=== June ===
- 1 June – 28 people are killed in the Flixborough disaster.
- 5 June – Snow Knight wins the Epsom Derby at odds of 50/1 ridden by Brian Taylor
- 8 June – Jon Pertwee leaves Doctor Who in the final episode of Planet of the Spiders citing the death of his close acting friend Roger Delgado (who played 'The Master') the previous year as the reason. He is replaced by Tom Baker.
- 10 June – The Queen's last surviving royal uncle, Prince Henry, Duke of Gloucester, dies at his home in Northamptonshire, seven years after his last public appearance. His funeral is held at Windsor Castle on 14 June. His younger, but only surviving, son, Prince Richard, Duke of Gloucester, succeeds to the title.
- 15 June – The Red Lion Square disorders see the National Front clash with counter-protesters in London's West End; 21-year-old Kevin Gateley, a university student, is killed.
- 17 June – A bomb explodes at the Houses of Parliament in London, damaging Westminster Hall. The Provisional Irish Republican Army (IRA) claims responsibility for planting the bomb.
- 24 June – The government admits testing a nuclear weapon in the United States causing a rift in the Labour Party.

=== July ===
- 3 July – Don Revie, the manager of Football League champions Leeds United since 1961, accepts the Football Association's £200,000-a-year deal to become the new England manager.
- 12 July – Bill Shankly, manager of FA Cup holders Liverpool, stuns the club by announcing his retirement after 15 years as manager. Shankly, 62, had arrived at Liverpool when they were in the Football League Second Division and transformed them into one of the world's top club sides with three top division titles, two FA Cups and a UEFA Cup triumph.
- 17 July – A bomb planted by the IRA explodes in the Tower of London's White Tower, killing one person and injuring 41. Another bomb explodes outside a government building in South London.
- 20 July – Leeds United appoint Brighton & Hove Albion manager Brian Clough, formerly of Derby County as their new manager.
- 21 July – 10,000 Greek-Cypriots protest in London against the Turkish invasion of Cyprus.
- 26 July – Liverpool appoint 55-year-old first team coach Bob Paisley as their new manager.
- 28 July – Last production of steel by the Bessemer process in Britain, at Workington.
- 31 July – Town and Country Amenities Act passed.

=== August ===
- 15 August – Collapse of Court Line and its subsidiaries Clarksons and Horizon Holidays leaves 100,000 holidaymakers stranded abroad.
- 29 August – Thames Valley Police break up the Windsor Free Festival.

=== September ===
- 12 September – Brian Clough is dismissed after 44 days as manager of defending league champions Leeds United following a disappointing start to the Football League season.
- 18 September – Harold Wilson confirms that a second general election for the year will be held on 10 October.
- 23 September – Ceefax is started by the BBC – one of the first public service information systems.
- 30 September – With the year's second general election 10 days away, opinion polls show Labour in the lead with Harold Wilson well placed to gain the overall majority that no party achieved in the election held seven months earlier.

=== October ===
- October – Five previously all-male Colleges of the University of Oxford admit women undergraduates for the first time.
- 5 October – Guildford pub bombings: Bombs planted by the IRA at pubs patronised by off-duty soldiers, The Horse and Groom and The Seven Stars, kill five people.
- 10 October – The second general election of the year results in a narrow victory for Harold Wilson, giving Labour a majority of three seats. It is widely expected that Edward Heath's leadership of the Conservative Party will soon be at an end, as he has now lost three of the four General Elections that he has contested in almost a decade as leader. The Scottish National Party secures its highest Westminster party representation to date with 11 seats. Enoch Powell is returned to Parliament standing for the Ulster Unionist Party in Northern Ireland. Powell, who was dismissed from the Conservative Shadow Cabinet in April 1968 following his controversial Rivers of Blood speech on immigration, had left the Conservative Party at the general election on 28 February and recently rejected an offer to stand as a candidate for the National Front.
- 16 October – Rioting prisoners set fire to the Maze Prison in Belfast.
- 19 October – Keith Joseph makes a speech in Edgbaston on the cycle of deprivation; the controversy it provokes has the effect of ruling him out of high office in the Conservative Party.
- 22 October – The IRA bombs Brooks's club in London.
- 28 October – The wife and son of Sports Minister Denis Howell survive an IRA bomb attack on their car.

=== November ===
- 4 November – Judith Ward is sentenced to life imprisonment for the M62 coach bombing; her conviction is overturned nearly 18 years later.
- 7 November
  - Lord Lucan disappears after the murder of his children's nanny.
  - A Provisional IRA bomb explodes at the Kings Arms, Woolwich.
- 11 November – The New Covent Garden Market in Nine Elms is opened.
- 13 November – McDonald's opens its first UK restaurant in Woolwich, South East London.
- 21 November – 21 people are killed in the Birmingham pub bombings.
- 24 November – The Birmingham Six are charged with the Birmingham pub bombings.
- 25 November – Home Secretary Roy Jenkins announces the government's intention to outlaw the IRA in the UK.
- 27 November – The Prevention of Terrorism Act is passed.

=== December ===
- 5 December – "Party Political Broadcast", the final episode of Monty Python's Flying Circus, is broadcast on BBC Two.
- 10 December
  - Friedrich Hayek shares the 1974 Nobel Prize in Economics with ideological rival Gunnar Myrdal "for their pioneering work in the theory of money and economic fluctuations and for their penetrating analysis of the interdependence of economic, social and institutional phenomena.".
  - Martin Ryle and Antony Hewish win the Nobel Prize in Physics "for their pioneering research in radio astrophysics: Ryle for his observations and inventions, in particular of the aperture synthesis technique, and Hewish for his decisive role in the discovery of pulsars".
- 15 December – New speed limits are introduced on Britain's roads in an attempt to save fuel at a time of Arab fuel embargoes following the Yom Kippur War.
- 18 December – The government pays £42,000 to families of victims of Bloody Sunday riots in Northern Ireland.
- 19 December – The ninth James Bond film, The Man with the Golden Gun, premieres in London. It is the second of seven films to star Roger Moore as James Bond.
- 22 December – The London home of Conservative Party leader and former Prime Minister Edward Heath is bombed in a suspected Provisional IRA attack. He is away from home when the bomb explodes, but returns just 10 minutes afterwards.
- 24 December – Former Cabinet Minister John Stonehouse is found living in Australia having faked his own death in Miami. He is quickly arrested by Australian police, who initially believe that he is Lord Lucan.
- 31 December – Roger Hargreaves' Mr. Men TV series is first broadcast on BBC1.

=== Undated ===
- Inflation soars to a 34-year high of 17.2% but the unemployment rate of 3.7% will not fall lower until 2022.
- The Department of Health and Social Security produces a report recommending that infants be breastfed for the first 4–6 months of life.
- China gives two giant pandas, Ching-Ching and Chia-Chia, to Britain.
- Japanese carmaker Mitsubishi begins importing cars to Britain under the Colt brand, bringing the number of Japanese carmakers selling cars in Britain to five.
- Investor Gold Index, a predecessor of IG Group, a global online financial trading service, is founded in London.
- First branch Early Learning Centre toy stores opens in Swindon.

== Publications ==
- The Campaign for Real Ale's first Good Beer Guide.
- Linton Kwesi Johnson's first poetry collection Voices of the Living and the Dead.
- Philip Larkin's poetry collection High Windows.
- John le Carré's novel Tinker, Tailor, Soldier, Spy, first in The Quest for Karla trilogy featuring George Smiley.
- Stanley Middleton's novel Holiday.
- Nikolaus Pevsner's guidebook Staffordshire, last in the Buildings of England series begun in 1951.
- F. W. Winterbotham's account The Ultra Secret: the inside story of Operation Ultra, Bletchley Park and Enigma.

== Births ==
- 12 January – Melanie C (Melanie Chisholm, "Sporty Spice"), English pop singer (Spice Girls)
- 15 January – Edith Bowman, radio DJ
- 16 January – Kate Moss, English model
- 30 January
  - Christian Bale, English actor
  - Olivia Colman, English actress
- 31 January – Ian Huntley, English murderer
- 6 February – Ed Chamberlin, English sports presenter
- 11 February – Nick Barmby, English footballer
- 13 February – Robbie Williams, English singer
- 22 February
  - James Blunt, British pop singer-songwriter
  - Chris Moyles, British disc jockey
- 25 February – Dominic Raab, politician
- 28 February – Lee Carsley, English football player and coach
- 5 March – Matt Lucas, English actor and comedian
- 6 March – Guy Garvey, English rock musician
- 7 March – Tobias Menzies, English actor
- 8 March – Ash Regan, Scottish politician
- 21 March – Ted Kravitz, sports presenter and reporter
- 28 March – Mark King, English snooker player
- 1 April – John Glen, politician
- 17 April – Victoria Beckham (née Adams, "Posh Spice"), English pop singer (Spice Girls) and fashion designer
- 18 April – Edgar Wright, film director
- 20 April – Tina Cousins, singer
- 24 April – "Comedy Dave" (David Vitty), Hong Kong-born media presenter
- 26 April – Adil Ray, actor and presenter
- 28 April – Vernon Kay, television and radio presenter
- 2 May
  - Matt Berry, actor and musician
  - Andy Johnson, English-Welsh footballer
- 7 May
  - Lynden David Hall, soul singer (died 2006)
  - Ian Pearce, English footballer and manager
- 8 May – Jon Tickle, television host
- 27 May – Denise van Outen, actress, television presenter, singer
- 5 June – Nina Conti, ventriloquist and actress
- 7 June – Bear Grylls, adventurer and television presenter
- 16 June – Andrea Jenkyns, politician
- 21 June – Natasha Desborough, British radio personality
- 22 June – Jo Cox, British politician (died 2016)
- 23 June – Meg-John Barker, author, academic, activist and psychotherapist
- 30 June – Kelli Ali, vocalist
- 14 July
  - David Mitchell, English comedy writer-performer
  - Cathy Newman, English journalist and presenter
  - Maxine Peake, English actress
- 25 July – Gareth Thomas, Welsh rugby player
- 28 July
  - Justin Lee Collins, English comedian, actor and author
  - Hannah Waddingham, English actress and singer
- 29 July – Akram Khan, English dancer and choreographer
- 31 July – Emilia Fox, English actress
- 8 August – Brian Harvey, English singer
- 23 August – Ray Park, Scottish actor
- 5 September – Lauren Jeska, transgender fell runner convicted of the attempted murder of Ralph Knibbs
- 6 September – Tim Henman, English tennis player
- 9 September – Gok Wan, stylist
- 13 September – Adam Ruckwood, English backstroke swimmer
- 18 September – Sol Campbell, English footballer
- 29 September – James Lance, English actor
- 10 October – Lucy Powell, English politician
- 15 October – Shumon Basar, writer and editor
- 17 October – Matthew Macfadyen, English actor
- 18 October – Robbie Savage, Welsh football player and pundit
- 20 October
  - Mohammad Sidique Khan, Islamic terrorist, leader of 7 July 2005 London bombings (died 2005)
  - Brian Limond, Scottish comedian and writer
- 29 October – Michael Vaughan, English cricketer
- 2 November – David Smith, English hammer thrower
- 4 November – Louise Redknapp, English R&B singer (Eternal)
- 24 November - Stephen Merchant, English comedy writer-performer
- 27 November – Wendy Houvenaghel, Welsh racing cyclist
- 9 December – Luisa Bradshaw-White, English actress
- 11 December – Ben Shephard, English television presenter
- 13 December
  - Sara Cox, English television and radio presenter
  - Nick McCarthy, English-born rock guitarist (Franz Ferdinand)
- Natalie Haynes, comedian and critic

== Deaths ==
- 12 January – Princess Patricia of Connaught (born 1886)
- 19 January – Edward Seago, artist (born 1910)
- 25 January – James Pope-Hennessy, biographer and travel writer (murdered) (born 1916)
- 29 January – H. E. Bates, novelist (born 1905)
- 23 February – Raymond Glendenning, radio sports commentator (born 1907)
- 23 March – Edward Molyneux, fashion designer (born 1891)
- 8 April – K. A. C. Creswell, architectural historian (born 1879)
- 22 April – Ivor Brown, journalist and author (born 1891)
- 9 May – L. T. C. Rolt, writer on engineering history (born 1910)
- 29 May – James MacTaggart, Scottish television producer (born 1928)
- 10 June – Prince Henry, Duke of Gloucester, last surviving child of George V (born 1900)
- 17 June – Sir Charles Keightley, Army general, Governor of Gibraltar (1958–1962) (born 1901)
- 4 July – Georgette Heyer, English novelist (born 1902)
- 13 July – Patrick Blackett, English physicist, Nobel Prize laureate (born 1897)
- 14 July – Sibyl Hathaway, Dame of Sark (since 1927) (born 1884)
- 24 July – James Chadwick, English physicist, Nobel Prize laureate (born 1891)
- 11 August – Compton Bennett, film director and writer (born 1900)
- 22 August – Jacob Bronowski, Polish-born mathematician and television presenter (born 1908)
- 29 August – Judith Furse, actress (born 1912)
- 2 September – Maureen Gardner, athlete (born 1928)
- 18 September – Harry Beck, graphic designer, creator of the London Underground map (born 1902)
- 28 October – David Jones, poet and artist (born 1895)
- 2 November – Hilda Margaret Bruce, zoologist (born 1903)
- 21 November – Sir William Andrewes, admiral (born 1899)
- 25 November – Nick Drake, Burma-born folk singer-songwriter (born 1948)
- 20 December
  - R. A. Bevan, English advertiser (born 1901)
  - R. Palme Dutt, British communist theoretician (born 1896)
- 21 December – James Henry Govier, British painter and etcher (born 1910)

== See also ==
- 1974 in British music
- 1974 in British television
- List of British films of 1974
