= Lyall Munro =

Lyall Munro may refer to:

- Lyall Munro Snr (1931–2020), Aboriginal Australian land rights activist and elder
- Lyall Munro Jnr (born 1951), Aboriginal activist and leader, son of Lyall Munro Snr
