= Michael Riley (artist) =

- Born: 1960; Dubbo, New South Wales, Australia
- Died: 2004 (aged 43–44); Sydney, New South Wales, Australia
- Occupations: Photographer, filmmaker
- Known for: Photography

Michael Riley (6 Jan 1960 – August 2004) was an Aboriginal Australian photographer and filmmaker, and co-founder of Boomalli Aboriginal Artists Cooperative. A significant figure in contemporary Indigenous Australian art, Riley's work is held by many public art institutions, including the National Gallery of Australia.

== Early life and education ==
Riley was born on 6 January 1960 in Dubbo, central New South Wales, to Allen Riley and Dorothy, née Wright. His early years were spent on the Talbragar Aboriginal Reserve with his parents and siblings David, Wendy and Carol. His mother grew up on one of the two Aboriginal missions in Moree.

== Career ==
Riley moved to Sydney in 1976, and attended a photography course at the Tin Sheds, University of Sydney. He subsequently worked as a technician in the photography department of the Sydney College of the Arts, where he continued to study. In 1986, his work, comprising five portraits of Aboriginal women, was included in the first exhibition of Indigenous photography at the Aboriginal Artists Gallery in Sydney. In the same year, along with nine other Sydney artists founded the Boomalli Aboriginal Artists Cooperative.

Along with working at Boomalli, Riley worked at Film Australia, making his first two documentary films: Boomalli: Five Artists (1988) and Dreamings (1988), the latter to accompany an exhibition of Aboriginal art at the Asia Society galleries in New York City.

In 1990 he created a series of photographs of people from the two missions of his mother's hometown, Moree, called A common place: Portraits of Moree Murries. Many of the subjects were relatives of Riley. Riley set up an outdoor studio in Moree and invited community members to participate. The exhibition was shown first at the Hogarth Gallery in Sydney, and then travelled to London, England, where it was shown in 1991. The large prints from the exhibition were presented to the Moree Plains Gallery (now BAMM: Bank Art Museum Moree). The State Library of New South Wales has digitised images of the photographs. In 1993 it acquired 10 smaller prints from the Boomalai Art Collective, printed and signed by Riley, and in 2016 acquired five further archival prints to complete the series, at which time it mounted an exhibition of them in the Amaze Gallery. The exhibition included a photo of Lyall Munro Snr and his wife Carmine Munro.

In 1996 Riley was commissioned by the Museum of Sydney to make Eora, a permanent video installation celebrating the Eora people of the Sydney region.

His film Empire (1997) looks at environmental destruction as a metaphor for the impact of colonisation on his culture.

== Themes ==
Riley's photographs range widely, but with an emphasis on portraiture, and on symbolic, sometimes surreal images. His parents were churchgoers, and Riley appropriated the iconography of his "creepy" religious experiences, particularly in projects such as Fly Blown (1998) and the digital art series Cloud (2000).

Many of Riley's photographs and films explore Indigenous identity, experience and politics, including Malangi: A day in the life of a bark painter (1991), Poison (1991), Blacktracker (1996), and Tent Boxers (2000).

== Recognition and posthumous exhibitions ==
Riley's work was among that of eight Australian Indigenous artists selected for an architectural commission for the Musée du Quai Branly in Paris in 2006.

Riley's first digital series, Cloud (2000), was included in Photograhica Australis at ARCO in Spain, the Fourth Asia Pacific Triennial of Contemporary Art at the Queensland Art Gallery in Brisbane, and the 2003 Festival of Sydney.

In 2009, a dance work paying tribute to Riley, called Riley, was choreographed by his second cousin Daniel Riley and performed by Bangarra Dance Theatre. Daniel had been inspired to do this after seeing an exhibition of Michael's photographs at the National Gallery of Australia in 2007. The work premiered as part of a double bill at the Sydney Opera House, and was a huge success.

In November–December 2016, his work was included in an exhibition celebrating the 40th anniversary of NAISDA at Carriageworks in Redfern. Naya Wa Yugali ("We Dance" in Darkinyung language).

== Death and legacy ==
He died in August 2004, aged 44.

== Collections ==
- Art Gallery of New South Wales
- Australian Institute of Aboriginal and Torres Strait Islander Studies
- Dubbo Regional Art Gallery
- Macarthur Institute of Higher Education
- BAMM: Bank Art Museum Moree
- Museum of Sydney
- National Gallery of Australia
- National Gallery of Victoria
- National Museum of Australia
- State Library of New South Wales
- Sydney Airport
- University of Sydney

== Selected filmography ==
- Boomalli: Five Koorie Artists (1988)
- Breakthrough series: Alice (1988)
- Dreamings: The art of Aboriginal Australia (1988)
- Frances (1990)
- Malangi: A day in the life of a bark painter (1991)
- Poison (1991)
- Quest for country (1993)
- Welcome to my Koori world (1993)
- A passage through the aisles (1994)
- Kangaroo dancer (1994)
- Eora (1995)
- Blacktracker (1996)
- The masters (1996)
- Empire (1997)
- I don't wanna be a bludger (1999)
- Tent boxers (2000)
