= List of UK top-ten albums in 1975 =

The UK Albums Chart is one of many music charts compiled by the Official Charts Company that calculates the best-selling albums of the week in the United Kingdom. Before 2004, the chart was only based on the sales of physical albums. This list shows albums that peaked in the Top 10 of the UK Albums Chart during 1975, as well as albums which peaked in 1974 and 1976 but were in the top 10 in 1975. The entry date is when the album appeared in the top ten for the first time (week ending, as published by the Official Charts Company, which is six days after the chart is announced).

The first new number-one album of the year was by His Greatest Hits by Engelbert Humperdinck. Overall, fourteen different albums peaked at number one in 1975, with fourteen unique artists hit that position.

== Top-ten albums ==
Key

Symbol	Meaning
‡	Album peaked in 1972, 1973 or 1974 but still in chart in 1975.
♦	Album released in 1975 but peaked in 1976.
Entered	The date that the album first appeared in the chart.
Peak	Highest position that the album reached in the UK Albums Chart.

Entered (week ending)	Weeks in top 10	Single	Artist	Peak	Peak reached (week ending)	Weeks at peak
Albums in 1972
22 July 1972	59	Simon and Garfunkel's Greatest Hits ‡	Simon & Garfunkel	2	29 July 1972	3
Albums in 1973
31 March 1973	43	The Dark Side of the Moon ‡	Pink Floyd	2	31 March 1973	1
7 July 1973	44	And I Love You So ‡	Perry Como	1	26 January 1974	1
1 September 1973	74	Tubular Bells ‡	Mike Oldfield	1	5 October 1974	1
22 December 1973	49	Band on the Run ‡	Paul McCartney & Wings	1	27 July 1974	7
Albums in 1974
2 February 1974	64	The Singles: 1969–1973 ‡	The Carpenters	1	2 February 1974	17
5 October 1974	4	Mud Rock	Mud	8	18 January 1975	1
12 October 1974	29	Rollin' ‡	Bay City Rollers	1	12 October 1974	4
9 November 1974	15	David Essex ‡	David Essex	2	14 December 1974	4
9 November 1974	16	Can't Get Enough ‡	Barry White	4	23 November 1974	3
23 November 1974	22	Elton John's Greatest Hits ‡	Elton John	1	23 November 1974	11
23 November 1974	12	Sheer Heart Attack ‡	Queen	2	30 November 1974	1
21 December 1974	4	Relayer ‡	Yes	4	21 December 1974	2
Albums in 1975
4 January 1975	13	His Greatest Hits	Engelbert Humperdinck	1	8 February 1975	3
25 January 1975	1	Cop Yer Whack for This	Billy Connolly	10	25 January 1975	1
8 February 1975	7	Crime of the Century	Supertramp	4	15 March 1975	1
15 February 1975	4	Blood on the Tracks	Bob Dylan	4	1 March 1975	1
1 March 1975	5	On the Level	Status Quo	1	1 March 1975	2
15 March 1975	6	Physical Graffiti	Led Zeppelin	1	15 March 1975	1
15 March 1975	2	Rock 'n' Roll	John Lennon	6	15 March 1975	1
15 March 1975	2	AWB	Average White Band	6	29 March 1975	1
22 March 1975	12	20 Greatest Hits: The Tenth Anniversary Album of Tom Jones	Tom Jones	1	22 March 1975	4
22 March 1975	9	The Shirley Bassey Singles Album	Shirley Bassey	2	29 March 1975	2
22 March 1975	3	The Best Years of Our Lives	Steve Harley & Cockney Rebel	4	22 March 1975	2
22 March 1975	19	The Original Soundtrack	10cc	3	17 May 1975	1
5 April 1975	3	Young Americans	David Bowie	2	12 April 1975	1
5 April 1975	7	Blue Jays	Justin Hayward and John Lodge	4	5 April 1975	1
12 April 1975	32	The Best of the Stylistics	The Stylistics	1	19 April 1975	9
12 April 1975	6	Straight Shooter	Bad Company	3	3 May 1975	1
19 April 1975	5	The Myths and Legends of King Arthur and the Knights of the Round Table	Rick Wakeman	2	19 April 1975	1
3 May 1975	23	Once Upon a Star	Bay City Rollers	1	3 May 1975	3
3 May 1975	1	Rubycon	Tangerine Dream	10	3 May 1975	1
17 May 1975	1	Tomorrow Belongs to Me	The Sensational Alex Harvey Band	9	17 May 1975	1
24 May 1975	6	Take Good Care of Yourself	The Three Degrees	6	7 June 1975	1
31 May 1975	5	The Very Best of Tammy Wynette	Tammy Wynette	4	14 June 1975	1
31 May 1975	2	Fox	Fox	7	31 May 1975	1
31 May 1975	5	Autobahn	Kraftwerk	4	7 June 1975	1
7 June 1975	13	Captain Fantastic and the Brown Dirt Cowboy	Elton John	2	7 June 1975	3
7 June 1975	1	Judith	Judy Collins	7	7 June 1975	1
21 June 1975	14	Venus and Mars	Wings	1	28 June 1975	2
28 June 1975	16	Horizon	The Carpenters	1	5 July 1975	5
28 June 1975	3	100cc – Greatest Hits of 10cc	10cc	9	28 June 1975	2
5 July 1975	1	Return to Fantasy	Uriah Heep	7	5 July 1975	1
12 July 1975	11	One of These Nights	Eagles	8	19 July 1975	6
19 July 1975	3	Step Two	Showaddywaddy	7	19 July 1975	2
26 July 1975	5	Mud Rock Vol. 2	Mud	6	9 August 1975	1
2 August 1975	1	The Basement Tapes	Bob Dylan and The Band	8	2 August 1975	1
9 August 1975	3	10 Years Non Stop – Jubilee Album	James Last	5	16 August 1975	1
23 August 1975	5	Thank You Baby	The Stylistics	5	23 August 1975	4
23 August 1975	10	Greatest Hits	Cat Stevens	2	27 September 1975	1
30 August 1975	24	Atlantic Crossing	Rod Stewart	1	30 August 1975	7
13 September 1975	10	The Very Best of Roger Whittaker	Roger Whittaker	5	20 September 1975	2
27 September 1975	7	Wish You Were Here	Pink Floyd	1	4 October 1975	1
27 September 1975	2	Sabotage	Black Sabbath	7	27 September 1975	1
27 September 1975	9	All the Fun of the Fair	David Essex	3	11 October 1975	3
27 September 1975	4	Another Year	Leo Sayer	8	11 October 1975	1
4 October 1975	16	Favourites	Peters and Lee	2	1 November 1975	2
18 October 1975	14	40 Golden Greats	Jim Reeves	1	25 October 1975	3
18 October 1975	3	The Who by Numbers	The Who	7	1 November 1975	1
25 October 1975	1	Rabbitts On and On and On...	Jasper Carrott	10	25 October 1975	1
1 November 1975	3	Breakaway	Art Garfunkel	7	8 November 1975	1
1 November 1975	5	We All Had Doctors' Papers	Max Boyce	1	15 November 1975	1
8 November 1975	4	Siren	Roxy Music	4	8 November 1975	1
8 November 1975	4	Rock of the Westies	Elton John	5	8 November 1975	2
8 November 1975	15	40 Greatest Hits	Perry Como	1	22 November 1975	6
22 November 1975	9	Ommadawn	Mike Oldfield	4	22 November 1975	2
29 November 1975	2	All Around My Hat	Steeleye Span	7	29 November 1975	1
29 November 1975	9	Make the Party Last – 25 All Time Party Greats	James Last	3	6 December 1975	3
6 December 1975	2	Disco Hits '75	Various artists	5	6 December 1975	1
6 December 1975	2	Get Right Intae Him	Billy Connolly	6	6 December 1975	1
6 December 1975	1	Rolled Gold	The Rolling Stones	7	6 December 1975	1
6 December 1975	2	Shaved Fish	John Lennon and the Plastic Ono Band	8	6 December 1975	1
13 December 1975	12	A Night at the Opera	Queen	1	27 December 1975	4
13 December 1975	7	Wouldn't You Like It ♦	Bay City Rollers	3	17 January 1976	1
13 December 1975	5	Songs of Joy	The Nigel Brooks Singers	5	20 December 1975	1
20 December 1975	11	24 Original Hits ♦	The Drifters	2	24 January 1976	1

== See also ==
- 1975 in British music
- List of number-one albums from the 1970s (UK)
