= Aboriginal Housing Office =

Statutory authority in New South Wales, Australia

NSW Aboriginal Housing Office
Statutory authority overview
- Formed: 24 July 1998
- Type: Department
- Jurisdiction: New South Wales
- Headquarters: Sydney
- Employees: 78 (2011)
- Annual budget: A$78 million (2011)
- Minister responsible: Hon. Natasha Maclaren-Jones MLC, Minister for Families and Communities, and Minister for Disability Services
- Statutory authority executive: Famey Williams, Chief Executive
- Parent Statutory authority: NSW Department of Family and Community Services
- Key document: Aboriginal Housing Act 1998 (NSW)
- Website: www.aho.nsw.gov.au

The NSW Aboriginal Housing Office (AHO) is a statutory authority within NSW Department of Family and Community Services in the Government of New South Wales that is responsible for the planning, development, delivery and evaluation of programs and services to support Aboriginal people in meeting their housing needs in the state of New South Wales, Australia.

The authority was established pursuant to the Aboriginal Housing Act 1998 and is led by its chief executive, presently, Famey Williams, who reports to an independent board that is ultimately responsible to the Minister for Families and Communities, presently the Hon. Natasha Maclaren-Jones MLC.

== Function ==
In exercising its principal functions, the AHO is required to;

- liaise with other government agencies and non-government bodies in the delivery of Aboriginal housing programs and services,
- coordinate Aboriginal housing programs and services with other programs and services that are provided by government agencies (including Commonwealth agencies) and non-government bodies to assist Aboriginal people and Torres Strait Islanders,
- develop priorities for Aboriginal housing programs and services in accordance with the objects of the Act,
- advise the Minister on Aboriginal housing policy,
- develop and implement strategies for the employment of Aboriginal people and Torres Strait Islanders in the delivery of Aboriginal housing programs and services.

The AHO works with the NSW Office of Community Housing and Housing NSW through their roles as complementary providers of social housing and their joint development of regional strategies for housing assistance. The AHO has contractual arrangements with Housing NSW for the provision of services including procurement, and tenancy and asset management.

== History ==
The Aboriginal Housing Act (NSW) was passed by the Parliament of New South Wales on 26 June 1998 and the NSW Aboriginal Housing Office was established on 24 July 1998. The passing of the act acknowledged the NSW government's commitment to the management, development and reform of the Aboriginal housing sector in NSW and established the AHO as the single administrative agency for delivering housing and housing-related programs across New South Wales.

Lyall Munro Snr was an inaugural member of the NSW Aboriginal Housing Office and the AHO Regional Aboriginal Housing Committee.

== See also ==
- Department of Housing
