= Department of Family and Community Services (New South Wales) =

Department overview
- Preceding agencies: Community Services NSW; Department of Human Services; Department of Community Services
- Dissolved: 1 July 2019
- Superseding Department: Department of Communities and Justice
- Jurisdiction: New South Wales
- Headquarters: Sydney, New South Wales, Australia
- Ministers responsible: Hon. Pru Goward MP, Minister for Family and Community Services, Minister for Social Housing, and Minister for Prevention of Domestic Violence and Sexual Assault; Hon. Tanya Davies MP, Minister for Ageing; Hon. Ray Williams MP, Minister for Disability Services and Minister for Multiculturalism
- Department executive: Michael Coutts-Trotter, Secretary
- Website: www.facs.nsw.gov.au/

The Department of Family and Community Services (FACS) is a former department of the Government of New South Wales and was previously responsible for the delivery of services to some of the most disadvantaged individuals, families and communities in the state of New South Wales, Australia until July 2019.

From its establishment in 2009 until the election of the O'Farrell Government in 2011, the department was known as the Department of Human Services.

Until its 2019 abolition, the department provided services to Aboriginal and Torres Strait Islander people, children and young people, families, people who are homeless, people with a disability, their families and carers, women, and older people. It was formed as a cluster agency from the former Department of Housing, Department of Community Services, and the Department of Ageing, Disability and Home Care.

The functions of the department, along with broader responsibilities, were transferred to the newly formed Department of Communities and Justice with effect from 1 July 2019.

== Structure ==
Until its abolition, the department was led by its Secretary, Michael Coutts-Trotter, who reported to the Minister for Family and Community Services, Minister for Social Housing, and Minister for Prevention of Domestic Violence and Sexual Assault, the Hon. Pru Goward MP; the Minister for Ageing, the Hon. Tanya Davies MP; and the Minister for Disability Services and Minister for Multiculturalism, the Hon. Ray Williams MP. Ultimately the ministers were responsible to the Parliament of New South Wales.

Agencies within FACS included:

- Ageing, Disability and Home Care including the Office for Ageing

- Disability Council of New South Wales
- Home and Community Care Program Advisory Committee
- Home Care Service of New South Wales
- NSW Businesslink Pty Ltd

- Community Services NSW, previously known as the Department of Community Services (DoCS)
- Housing NSW

- Aboriginal Housing Office, a statutory body
- City West Housing Pty Ltd
- Home Purchase Assistance Fund

== Funding of homelessness services ==
During the mid-1970s in Australia, a number of youth refuges were established in New South Wales. These refuges were founded by local youth workers, providing crisis accommodation, soon began getting funding from the NSW Government. These early refuges include Caretakers Cottage, Young People's Refuge, Taldemunde among others.

In 2012, Minister Pru Goward announced a comprehensive reforms affecting the funding of homelessness services. The reform, known a "Going Home Staying Home", sought to shift funding from historical agreements to census based allocations.

== See also ==
- Department of Community Services (1881–2009)
