= Reigate College =

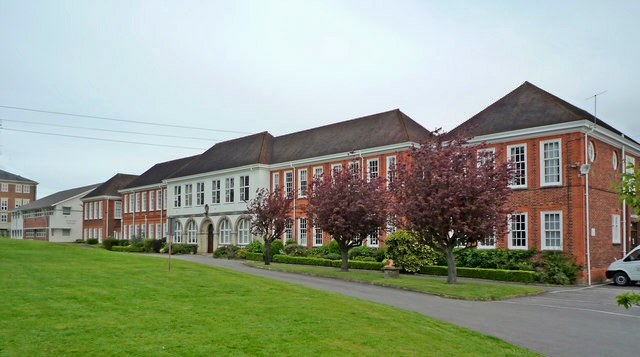
- View of the college buildings from the back entry that is accessible from the Reigate High Street

Location
- Castlefield Road; Reigate, Surrey, RH2 0SD; United Kingdom; 51.240°N 0.202°W

Information
- Type: Sixth Form College
- Religious affiliation: None
- Established: 31 March 1977 as a sixth form college
- Status: Open
- Local authority: Surrey
- Category: Sixth Form College
- Department for Education URN: 145005 Tables
- Ofsted: Reports
- Principal: Nick Clark
- Gender: Mixed
- Age: 16 to 19
- Enrolment: 2,945 students as of 21st April 2026
- Student Union/Association: Yes
- Colours: Green and white
- Sports: Football Rugby Netball Basketball Trampolining
- Website: http://www.reigate.ac.uk/

Reigate College is a state sixth form college in Reigate, Surrey, England, for students aged 16–19. The college occupies part of the town centre between the High Street and railway station.

Reigate College was graded by Ofsted as "Outstanding" in 2008.

== Curriculum and offered courses ==
The college offers predominantly GCE AS/A level and BTEC two-year courses, and GCSE re-sit courses in Mathematics, English Language and Biology, alongside a student's 2 year programme. You are able to take up to four A levels, with a common fourth being Further Mathematics.

The college requires four hours of external work to be set for each subject on top of the four hours of weekly lessons for each subject. These are separated into two hours for homework and two for Structured Learning Tasks, which are tasks set by the head of department and help with revising the course content.

=== A Levels ===
==== Arts ====
- Art (Fine Art)
- Dance
- Film Studies
- Graphics
- Media Studies
- Music
- Music Technology
- Photography
- Product Design (3D Design)
- Textiles

==== Humanities ====
- Classical Civilisation
- English Literature
- Geography
- History
- Philosophy
- Religion & Ethics

==== Social Sciences ====
- Criminology
- Law
- Politics
- Psychology
- Sociology

==== Languages and Linguistics ====
- English Language & Literature A Level
- French
- German
- Spanish

==== Business, Finance and Economics ====
- Business
- Economics

==== Health and Applied Sciences ====
- Physical Education

==== STEM (Science, Technology, Engineering, Maths) ====
- Biology
- Chemistry
- Computer Science
- Mathematics A Level
- Further Mathematics A Level
- Physics

=== BTECs (A level equivalent) ===
==== Arts ====
- Creative Digital Media Production
- Music (Performance)
- Performing Arts (Acting)
- Performing Arts (Acting, Musical Theatre and Movement) (Three A Level Equivalent)
- Performing Arts (Musical Theatre)

==== Social Sciences ====
- Law

==== Business, Finance and Economics ====
- Business

==== Health and Applied Sciences ====
- Human Biology
- Health & Social Care
- Sport and Exercise Science
- Sport

==== STEM ====
- Computing
- Engineering

==== Other ====
- Travel & Tourism
- Public Services

The college also offers the chance to do an EPQ, under the Aspire Programme. If you receive a grade average of 7+, you are automatically entered, but you may drop it if you do not wish to do one. Those with a grade average lower than 7 can apply to enter. Doing four A levels and an EPQ is not recommended, but the college will not strongly advise you against it.

Previously, there was provision for students to enrol on an Intermediate Programme (pre- A Level), however the college made an assertion that "due to changes in government policy [it] is now no longer the case".

== Entry requirements ==
Five GCSE passes (grades 4-9) and acceptable school report and attendance figures throughout Year 10 and 11, with a focus on attendance in Year 11. 'Acceptable' attendance is typically 95% and above, however if there were valid circumstances for low attendance the college will accept them.

== Feeder schools ==
Recruiting or drawing from up to 100 state and independent schools each year, the college serves as a dedicated sixth form to seven partner schools: Oakwood School, Reigate School, Carrington School, de Stafford School, Merstham Park School, The Priory CofE School Dorking and The Beacon School. Students at these schools are guaranteed a place at the College, providing they meet entry requirements.

== Independent learning centres (ILCs) ==
The main ILC is in the Independent Learning centre building with the library.

There is a computer suite, where students have access to PC's. There are copies of College textbooks and subject related magazines to support students' learning.

== Notable alumni ==
- Norman Cook, musician (also known as Fatboy Slim)
- Natasha Desborough, author and radio personality
- Michael Greco, actor
- Guy and Howard Lawrence, of Disclosure
- Jessie Mei Li, actress
- Hinako Omori, musician
- Ethan Pinnock, footballer
- Jake Roche, singer and former actor (a part of Push Baby)
- Faye White, former England football captain
