= 1974 in British music =

This is a summary of 1974 in music in the United Kingdom, including the official charts from that year.

== Events ==
- 6 April – The 19th Eurovision Song Contest is staged at the Dome in Brighton. The winners, Sweden's ABBA, go on to be the top-selling act of the decade.
- 7 May – Led Zeppelin announce their new record label, Swan Song Records, with a lavish party at the Four Seasons Hotel in New York.
- 19 June – Alan Bush's 1950 opera Wat Tyler receives its UK première at Sadler's Wells Theatre, the only time one of Bush's operas has been staged in the UK.
- 20 July – The first Knebworth Concert is held, headlined by the Allman Brothers Band.
- 2 November – George Harrison launches his George Harrison & Friends North American Tour in Vancouver. It is Harrison's first tour since the Beatles North American tour of 1966.
- 28 November – John Lennon joins Elton John on stage at Madison Square Garden for three songs. It would be Lennon's last stage performance.
- 12 December – Mick Taylor leaves the Rolling Stones after six years.

== Number Ones ==
=== Singles ===
Date	Single	Artist
5 January	"Merry Xmas Everybody"	Slade
12 January	"Merry Xmas Everybody"	Slade
19 January	"You Won't Find Another Fool Like Me"	The New Seekers
26 January	"Tiger Feet"	Mud
2 February	"Tiger Feet"	Mud
9 February	"Tiger Feet"	Mud
16 February	"Tiger Feet"	Mud
23 February	"Devil Gate Drive"	Suzi Quatro
2 March	"Devil Gate Drive"	Suzi Quatro
9 March	"Jealous Mind"	Alvin Stardust
16 March	"Billy Don't Be a Hero"	Paper Lace
23 March	"Billy Don't Be a Hero"	Paper Lace
30 March	"Billy Don't Be a Hero"	Paper Lace
6 April	"Seasons in the Sun"	Terry Jacks
13 April	"Seasons in the Sun"	Terry Jacks
20 April	"Seasons in the Sun"	Terry Jacks
27 April	"Seasons in the Sun"	Terry Jacks
4 May	"Waterloo"	ABBA
11 May	"Waterloo"	ABBA
18 May	"Sugar Baby Love"	The Rubettes
25 May	"Sugar Baby Love"	The Rubettes
1 June	"Sugar Baby Love"	The Rubettes
8 June	"Sugar Baby Love"	The Rubettes
15 June	"The Streak"	Ray Stevens
22 June	"Always Yours"	Gary Glitter
29 June	"She"	Charles Aznavour
6 July	"She"	Charles Aznavour
13 July	"She"	Charles Aznavour
20 July	"She"	Charles Aznavour
27 July	"Rock Your Baby"	George McCrae
3 August	"Rock Your Baby"	George McCrae
10 August	"Rock Your Baby"	George McCrae
17 August	"When Will I See You Again"	The Three Degrees
24 August	"When Will I See You Again"	The Three Degrees
31 August	"Love Me for a Reason"	The Osmonds
7 September	"Love Me for a Reason"	The Osmonds
14 September	"Love Me for a Reason"	The Osmonds
21 September	"Kung Fu Fighting"	Carl Douglas
28 September	"Kung Fu Fighting"	Carl Douglas
5 October	"Kung Fu Fighting"	Carl Douglas
12 October	"Annie's Song"	John Denver
19 October	"Sad Sweet Dreamer"	Sweet Sensation
26 October	"Everything I Own"	Ken Boothe
2 November	"Everything I Own"	Ken Boothe
9 November	"Everything I Own"	Ken Boothe
16 November	"Gonna Make You a Star"	David Essex
23 November	"Gonna Make You a Star"	David Essex
30 November	"Gonna Make You a Star"	David Essex
7 December	"You're the First, the Last, My Everything"	Barry White
14 December	"You're the First, the Last, My Everything"	Barry White
21 December	"Lonely This Christmas"	Mud
28 December	"Lonely This Christmas"	Mud
4 January	"Lonely This Christmas"	Mud

=== Albums ===
Date	Album	Artist	Weeks
5 January	Tales from Topographic Oceans	Yes	2
12 January	Tales from Topographic Oceans	Yes	2
19 January	Sladest	Slade	1
26 January	And I Love You So	Perry Como	1
2 February	The Singles: 1969-1973	The Carpenters	4
9 February	The Singles: 1969-1973	The Carpenters	4
16 February	The Singles: 1969-1973	The Carpenters	4
23 February	The Singles: 1969-1973	The Carpenters	4
2 March	Old, New, Borrowed and Blue	Slade	1
9 March	The Singles: 1969-1973	The Carpenters	11
16 March	The Singles: 1969-1973	The Carpenters	11
23 March	The Singles: 1969-1973	The Carpenters	11
30 March	The Singles: 1969-1973	The Carpenters	11
6 April	The Singles: 1969-1973	The Carpenters	11
13 April	The Singles: 1969-1973	The Carpenters	11
20 April	The Singles: 1969-1973	The Carpenters	11
27 April	The Singles: 1969-1973	The Carpenters	11
4 May	The Singles: 1969-1973	The Carpenters	11
11 May	The Singles: 1969-1973	The Carpenters	11
18 May	The Singles: 1969-1973	The Carpenters	11
25 May	Journey to the Centre of the Earth	Rick Wakeman	1
1 June	The Singles: 1969-1973	The Carpenters	1
8 June	Diamond Dogs	David Bowie	4
15 June	Diamond Dogs	David Bowie	4
22 June	Diamond Dogs	David Bowie	4
29 June	Diamond Dogs	David Bowie	4
6 July	The Singles: 1969-1973	The Carpenters	1
13 July	Caribou	Elton John	2
20 July	Caribou	Elton John	2
27 July	Band on the Run	Paul McCartney & Wings	7
3 August	Band on the Run	Paul McCartney & Wings	7
10 August	Band on the Run	Paul McCartney & Wings	7
17 August	Band on the Run	Paul McCartney & Wings	7
24 August	Band on the Run	Paul McCartney & Wings	7
31 August	Band on the Run	Paul McCartney & Wings	7
7 September	Band on the Run	Paul McCartney & Wings	7
14 September	Hergest Ridge	Mike Oldfield	3
21 September	Hergest Ridge	Mike Oldfield	3
28 September	Hergest Ridge	Mike Oldfield	3
5 October	Tubular Bells	Mike Oldfield	1
12 October	Rollin'	Bay City Rollers	1
19 October	Smiler	Rod Stewart	1
26 October	Rollin'	Bay City Rollers	1
2 November	Smiler	Rod Stewart	1
9 November	Rollin'	Bay City Rollers	2
16 November	Rollin'	Bay City Rollers	2
23 November	Greatest Hits	Elton John	7
30 November	Greatest Hits	Elton John	7
7 December	Greatest Hits	Elton John	7
14 December	Greatest Hits	Elton John	7
21 December	Greatest Hits	Elton John	7
28 December	Greatest Hits	Elton John	7
4 January	Greatest Hits	Elton John	7

== Year-end charts ==
Between 2 January and 6 December 1974.

=== Best-selling singles ===
No.	Title	Artist	Peak position
1	"Tiger Feet"	Mud	1
2	"Seasons in the Sun"	Terry Jacks	1
3	"Billy Don't Be a Hero"	Paper Lace	1
4	"When Will I See You Again"	The Three Degrees	1
5	"Rock Your Baby"	George McCrae	1
6	"Gonna Make You a Star"	David Essex	1
7	"She"	Charles Aznavour	1
8	"Kung Fu Fighting"	Carl Douglas	1
9	"Everything I Own"	Ken Boothe	1
10	"Sugar Baby Love"	The Rubettes	1
11	"Devil Gate Drive"	Suzi Quatro	1
12	"Love Me for a Reason"	The Osmonds	1
13	"Jealous Mind"	Alvin Stardust	1
14	"The Air That I Breathe"	The Hollies	2
15	"Annie's Song"	John Denver	1
16	"Waterloo"	ABBA	1
17	"The Wombling Song"	The Wombles	4
18	"You Make Me Feel Brand New"	The Stylistics	2
19	"The Most Beautiful Girl"	Charlie Rich	2
20	"Y Viva España"	Sylvia	4
21	"Hey Rock and Roll"	Showaddywaddy	2
22	"Kissin' in the Back Row of the Movies"	The Drifters	2
23	"I'm Leaving It Up to You"	Donny Osmond & Marie Osmond	2
24	"The Streak"	Ray Stevens	1
25	"Teenage Rampage"	Sweet	2
26	"Remember You're a Womble"	The Wombles	3
27	"Always Yours"	Gary Glitter	1
28	"You're Sixteen"	Ringo Starr	4
29	"Killer Queen"	Queen	2
30	"This Town Ain't Big Enough for Both of Us"	Sparks	2
31	"Don't Stay Away Too Long"	Peters and Lee	3
32	"You're the First, the Last, My Everything"	Barry White	1
33	"Angel Face"	The Glitter Band	4
34	"Born with a Smile on My Face"	Stephanie de Sykes with Rain	2
35	"Hang On in There Baby"	Johnny Bristol	3
36	"What Becomes of the Brokenhearted"	Jimmy Ruffin	4
37	"The Cat Crept In"	Mud	2
38	"There's a Ghost in My House"	R. Dean Taylor	3
39	"Sad Sweet Dreamer"	Sweet Sensation	1
40	"Dance with the Devil"	Cozy Powell	3
41	"Solitaire"	Andy Williams	4
42	"Summerlove Sensation"	Bay City Rollers	3
43	"Hey There Lonely Girl"	Eddie Holman	4
44	"Emma"	Hot Chocolate	3
45	"You Won't Find Another Fool Like Me"	The New Seekers	1
46	"You Are Everything"	Diana Ross & Marvin Gaye	5
47	"Far Far Away"	Slade	2
48	"All of Me Loves All of You"	Bay City Rollers	4
49	"Remember (Sha-La-La-La)"	Bay City Rollers	6
50	"Band on the Run"	Paul McCartney and Wings	3

=== Best-selling albums ===
The list of the top fifty best-selling albums of 1974 were published in Music Week and in Record Mirror at the end of the year, and later reproduced in the first edition of the BPI Year Book in 1976. However, in 2007 the Official Charts Company published album chart histories for each year from 1956 to 1977, researched by historian Sharon Mawer, and included an updated list of the top ten best-selling albums for each year based on the new research. The updated top ten for 1974 is shown in the table below.

No.	Title	Artist	Peak position
1	The Singles: 1969–1973	The Carpenters	1
2	Band on the Run	Paul McCartney and Wings	1
3	Tubular Bells	Mike Oldfield	1
4	40 Greatest Hits	Elvis Presley	— (Note: 40 Greatest Hits was not eligible for the album chart in 1974, as television-advertised compilations were excluded from the chart until July 1975. The album did not officially reach number one until September 1977, following Presley's death.)
5	The Dark Side of the Moon	Pink Floyd	7 (Note: Reached number 2 in 1973)
6	Diamond Dogs	David Bowie	1
7	Goodbye Yellow Brick Road	Elton John	2 (Note: Reached number 1 in 1973)
8	And I Love You So	Perry Como	1
9	Greatest Hits	Simon & Garfunkel	6 (Note: Reached number 2 in 1972)
10	Greatest Hits	Elton John	1

== Classical music: new works ==
- Benjamin Britten – Suite on English Folk Tunes: 'A time there was...'

== Film and incidental music ==
- Richard Rodney Bennett – Murder on the Orient Express, starring Albert Finney
- Herbert Chappell – The Pallisers
- Andrew Lloyd Webber – The Odessa File
- Stanley Myers – House of Whipcord directed by Pete Walker

== Births ==
- 2 January – Ian Vine, composer
- 12 January – Melanie C, singer (Spice Girls)
- 7 February – Danny Goffey, singer-songwriter and drummer (Supergrass, Babyshambles, The Jennifers, Lodger, and The Hotrats)
- 13 February – Robbie Williams, singer (Take That)
- 22 February
  - Chris Corner, singer-songwriter and musician (Sneaker Pimps, IAMX)
  - James Blunt, singer-songwriter
  - Chris Moyles, radio and television host
- 15 March – David Ross, singer (Bad Boys Inc)
- 23 March – David and Michael Smallwood, singers (Gemini)
- 1 April – Stuart Black, bassist (Menswear)
- 17 April – Victoria Beckham, singer (Spice Girls)
- 20 April – Tina Cousins, singer
- 3 May – Nick Keynes, bassist (Ultra)
- 7 May – Lynden David Hall, singer, songwriter, arranger, and record producer
- 3 June – Kelly Jones, singer-songwriter and guitarist
- 10 July – Simon White, guitarist (Menswear)
- 17 July – Laura Macdonald, Scottish saxophonist and composer
- 21 July – Terry Coldwell, singer (East 17)
- 5 August – Spike Dawbarn, singer (911)
- 8 August – Brian Harvey, singer (East 17)
- 18 August – Mark Baron, singer (Another Level)
- 9 September – Niall O'Neill, Irish singer (OTT)
- 22 September – G-Man, Trinidadian-born singer (MN8)
- 1 October – Keith Duffy, Irish singer (Boyzone)
- 4 November – Louise Nurding, singer and former member of Eternal
- 10 November – Heavenli Denton, singer (Honeyz)
- 23 November – Jacqui Blake, singer (Shampoo)
- 7 December – Nicole Appleton, Canadian-born singer (All Saints)
- 13 December – Nick McCarthy, English-German rhythm guitarist (Franz Ferdinand)
- 27 December – Tasha Baylis, drummer (Hepburn)
- date unknown
  - Matthew Jones, violist, violinist and composer
  - Sophie Viney, composer and arranger

== Deaths ==
- 1 April – Alfred Whitehead, English-born Canadian composer, organist, choirmaster, music educator and painter, 86
- 5 April – Jennifer Vyvyan, operatic soprano, 49 (bronchial condition)
- 28 April – Leslie Statham, composer and arranger,
- 5 May – Adge Cutler, folk musician, 42 (car accident)
- 8 May – Graham Bond, R&B musician, 36 (hit by train)
- 15 September – Thomas Fielden, pianist and teacher, 90
- November – Bessie Jones, musical theatre singer, 87
- 3 November – Victor Olof, violinist and conductor, 76
- 25 November – Nick Drake, singer/songwriter, 26 (overdose)

== See also ==
- 1974 in British radio
- 1974 in British television
- 1974 in the United Kingdom
- List of British films of 1974
