= Nand =

Nand or NAND may refer to:

== Computing ==
- Logical NAND or nand, a binary operation in logic (Not AND)
  - NAND gate, an electronic gate that implements a logical NAND
  - NAND logic, methods of building other logic gates using just NAND gates
- NAND flash memory, a type of non-volatile computer memory

== People ==
- Nand Kishore (cricketer, born 1970), Indian former cricketer
- Nand Kishore Garg (born 1949), senior social worker
- Nand Gopal Gupta (born 1974), former Minister of Homeopathy in the Government of Uttar Pradesh
- Nainendra Nand, Solicitor-General of Fiji from 1997 to 2006
- Nand Kumar Patel (1953–2013), Indian National Congress politician from the Chhattisgarh
- Nand Singh (1914–1947), Indian recipient of the Victoria Cross
- Lisa Francesca Nand (born 1974), journalist
- Nand Lal Noorpuri (died 1966), Punjabi poet, writer and lyricist

== Other uses ==
- Nand Dam, the Lower Wunna Dam over the Nand river
- Nanda Baba or Nand, a figure in Hindu mythology
- Nand (TV series), a Pakistani TV series produced by ARY Digital
- Nandinagari (ISO 15924 code)

== See also ==
- Nanda (disambiguation)
