= Individual Family Service Plan =

For education in the United States, an Individualized Family Service Plan (IFSP) is a plan to obtain special education services for young children aged 0–3 years within U.S. public schools. It is provided by a community agency or home school district to families of children with developmental delays or specific health conditions according to the Individuals with Disabilities Education Act (IDEA).

== Background ==
The Individuals with Disabilities Education Act (IDEA) works to protect and provide early intervention services to infants and toddlers with developmental delays or specific health conditions. Part B of IDEA addresses services for children from ages 3 to 21. In some states, Part C regulates services for children from birth to three years old.

According to IDEA part C, an at-risk infant is defined as an infant under three years old with developmental delays that will not likely improve without early intervention.

Each state has their own specific criteria for eligibility. For example, under California's education code, the infant must have at least a 33% delay in one or more areas of development. These areas include cognitive, emotional, adaptive, communication, social, motor, or other deficits. Possible services that families can obtain may include vision, hearing, speech and language services, occupational or physical therapy, and other specialized services areas.

== Process ==
Parents have the right to request that their infant or toddler be assessed by a community agency or their home school district. They may first discuss it with their physician.

An Individualized Family Service Plan (IFSP) is made to address the individualized needs of the child, concerns of the parents, and early intervention services. The plan must include: an assessment of a child's present levels of development, a statement of goals, support services that will be put in place to achieve those goals, the date services will begin, and the name and identification of the service coordinator. Through the referral process, a service coordinator works with the family to connect them with early intervention services that will enhance the child's development based on the targeted needs of the child.

An IFSP is targeted towards the family as a whole and includes locations of natural environments, such as home, parks, childcare, and gym classes. The main goal of an IFSP is to help the family as a whole, not just the child. A re-evaluation is usually done in six-month intervals but can be done more often if necessary. Once a child turns three years old, a child is eligible to transition to an Individualized Education Plan (IEP).

== Difference from an Individualized Education Plan ==
An Individualized Education Plan (IEP) applies to children between the ages of three and twenty-one years. An IEP is connected to special education in the school setting. The goals that are put into place within an IEP are targeted specifically towards only the student. This focus creates opportunities for learning interventions in everyday routines and activities.

The same center that supplies children 0–3 with an IFSP also supplies adults and older children with an Individual Program Plan.

== Parent rights ==
Parents are entitled to certain rights in regard to their child's IFSP. It is required that they receive a full explanation of all of their rights. Parent rights include, but are not limited to, the ability to review their child's education record, the right to participate in meetings, have an outside evaluation of their child, obtain a prior written notice of evaluation, deny services or decisions, and file complaints.
