= List of British films of 1974 =

British films released in 1974

A list of films produced in the United Kingdom in 1974 (see 1974 in film):

== 1974 ==
Title	Director	Cast	Genre	Notes
1974
11 Harrowhouse	Aram Avakian	Charles Grodin, Candice Bergen, James Mason	Thriller	
The Abdication	Anthony Harvey	Peter Finch, Liv Ullmann, Cyril Cusack	Historical	
Akenfield	Peter Hall	Stanley Baxter, Ronald Blythe, Barbara Tilney	Drama	
And Then There Were None	Peter Collinson	Richard Attenborough, Oliver Reed, Elke Sommer	Mystery	International co-production
The Beast Must Die	Paul Annett	Peter Cushing, Anton Diffring, Calvin Lockhart	Horror	
The Black Windmill	Don Siegel	Michael Caine, Donald Pleasence, Delphine Seyrig	Spy thriller	Co-production with France & US
Brief Encounter	Alan Bridges	Richard Burton, Sophia Loren, Jack Hedley	Romantic drama	Co-production with Italy
Butley	Harold Pinter	Alan Bates, Jessica Tandy, Susan Engel	Drama	
Callan	Don Sharp	Edward Woodward, Eric Porter, Peter Egan	Thriller	TV spin-off from Callan
Can You Keep It Up for a Week?	Jim Atkinson	Jeremy Bulloch, Neil Hallett, Sue Longhurst	Sex comedy	
Captain Kronos – Vampire Hunter	Brian Clemens	Horst Janson, John Carson, Caroline Munro	Horror	
Caravan to Vaccarès	Geoffrey Reeve	David Birney, Charlotte Rampling, Michael Lonsdale	Thriller	Co-production with France
Carry On Dick	Gerald Thomas	Sid James, Barbara Windsor, Kenneth Williams	Comedy	
The Cherry Picker	Peter Curran	Lulu, Bob Sherman, Wilfrid Hyde-White	Drama	
Confessions of a Window Cleaner	Val Guest	Robin Askwith, Antony Booth, Linda Hayden	Sex comedy	
Craze	Freddie Francis	Jack Palance, Diana Dors, Julie Ege	Horror	
Dark Places	Don Sharp	Christopher Lee, Joan Collins, Herbert Lom	Thriller	
Dead Cert	Tony Richardson	Scott Antony, Judi Dench, Michael Williams	Crime thriller	
Diamonds on Wheels	Jerome Courtland	Patrick Allen, George Sewell, Barry Jackson	Comedy	
Don't Just Lie There, Say Something!	Bob Kellett	Brian Rix, Leslie Phillips, Joan Sims	Comedy	
Feelings	Gerry O'Hara	Kate O'Mara, Paul Freeman, Edward Judd	Drama	
The Four Musketeers	Richard Lester	Oliver Reed, Richard Chamberlain, Frank Finlay, Michael York	Adventure	
Frankenstein and the Monster from Hell	Terence Fisher	Peter Cushing, David Prowse, Madeline Smith	Horror	
Frightmare	Pete Walker	Rupert Davies, Sheila Keith, Leo Genn	Horror	
From Beyond the Grave	Kevin Connor	Peter Cushing, Ian Bannen, Margaret Leighton	Portmanteau horror	
Ghost Story	Stephen Weeks	Marianne Faithfull, Leigh Lawson, Barbara Shelley	Mystery	
The God King	Lester James Peries	Leigh Lawson, Oliver Tobias, Ravindra Randeniya	Historical	Co-production with Sri Lanka
Gold	Peter R. Hunt	Roger Moore, Susannah York, Ray Milland	Adventure	
Got It Made	James Kenelm Clarke	Lalla Ward, Michael Latimer, Katya Wyeth	Drama	
Great Expectations	Joseph Hardy	Michael York, Sarah Miles, James Mason	Historical	Entered into the 9th Moscow International Film Festival
House of Whipcord	Pete Walker	Patrick Barr, Ray Brooks, Ann Michelle	Horror	
The Internecine Project	Ken Hughes	James Coburn, Lee Grant, Harry Andrews	Spy thriller	Co-production with West Germany & US
Juggernaut	Richard Lester	Richard Harris, Omar Sharif, David Hemmings	Thriller	
Keep It Up, Jack	Derek Ford	Mark Jones, Sue Longhurst, Linda Regan	Sex comedy	
The Land That Time Forgot	Kevin Connor	Doug McClure, John McEnery, Susan Penhaligon	Fantasy adventure	Co-production with US
The Legend of the 7 Golden Vampires	Roy Ward Baker	Peter Cushing, Julie Ege, John Forbes-Robertson	Horror action	Co-production with Hong Kong
Little Malcolm	Stuart Cooper	Rosalind Ayres, John Hurt, David Warner	Comedy drama	Won the Silver Bear at Berlin
The Little Prince	Stanley Donen	Steven Warner, Richard Kiley, Gene Wilder	Musical	Co-production with US
Madhouse	Jim Clark	Vincent Price, Peter Cushing, Adrienne Corri	Horror	
Mahler	Ken Russell	Robert Powell, Georgina Hale, Lee Montague	Biopic	
Man About the House	John Robins	Richard O'Sullivan, Paula Wilcox, Sally Thomsett	Comedy	
The Man Who Couldn't Get Enough	Alan Birkinshaw	Roger Lloyd Pack, Vicki Hodge, Ava Cadell	Sex comedy	
The Man with the Golden Gun	Guy Hamilton	Roger Moore, Christopher Lee, Maud Adams, Britt Ekland, Richard Loo	Spy	
The Marseille Contract	Robert Parrish	Michael Caine, Anthony Quinn, James Mason	Thriller	Co-production with France
Moments	Peter Crane	Keith Michell, Angharad Rees, Bill Fraser	Drama	
Murder on the Orient Express	Sidney Lumet	Albert Finney, Lauren Bacall, Sean Connery, Ingrid Bergman	Mystery	Based on Agatha Christie's novel. Ingrid Bergman won the Academy Award for Best Supporting Actress.
The Mutations	Jack Cardiff	Tom Baker, Brad Harris, Donald Pleasence	Horror	Co-production with US
The ODESSA File	Ronald Neame	Jon Voight, Maximilian Schell, Mary Tamm	Spy thriller	Co-production with West Germany
Open Season	Peter Collinson	Peter Fonda, Cornelia Sharpe, William Holden	Action	Co-production with Spain
On the Game	Stanley Long	Lloyd Lamble, Carmen Silvera, Olive McFarland	Sex comedy	
Paul and Michelle	Lewis Gilbert	Anicée Alvina, Sean Bury, Ronald Lewis	Drama	Co-production with France
Percy's Progress	Ralph Thomas	Leigh Lawson, Elke Sommer, Denholm Elliott	Comedy	
Persecution	Don Chaffey	Lana Turner, Trevor Howard, Ralph Bates	Horror thriller	
Phase IV	Saul Bass	Michael Murphy, Nigel Davenport, Lynne Frederick	Sci-fi	
The Rehearsal	Jules Dassin	Olympia Dukakis, Melina Mercouri, Laurence Olivier	Drama	Co-production with Greece
The Satanic Rites of Dracula	Alan Gibson	Christopher Lee, Peter Cushing, Joanna Lumley	Horror	
Shatter	Michael Carreras, Monte Hellman	Stuart Whitman, Peter Cushing, Anton Diffring	Action	Co-production with Hong Kong
Soft Beds, Hard Battles	Roy Boulting	Peter Sellers, Lila Kedrova, Curd Jürgens	Comedy	
Son of Dracula	Freddie Francis	Harry Nilsson, Ringo Starr, Suzanna Leigh	Musical	
Stardust	Michael Apted	David Essex, Adam Faith, Larry Hagman	Drama	
Swallows and Amazons	Claude Whatham	Virginia McKenna, Ronald Fraser, Suzanna Hamilton	Family	
The Swordsman	Lindsay Shonteff	Linda Marlowe, Alan Lake, Edina Ronay	Action	
Symptoms	José Ramón Larraz	Angela Pleasence, Raymond Huntley, Peter Vaughan	Horror thriller	Entered into the 1974 Cannes Film Festival
The Tamarind Seed	Blake Edwards	Julie Andrews, Omar Sharif, Anthony Quayle	Spy romance	Co-production with US
The Tempter	Damiano Damiani	Glenda Jackson, Claudio Cassinelli, Lisa Harrow	Drama	Co-production with Italy
Vampira	Clive Donner	David Niven, Teresa Graves, Nicky Henson	Horror comedy	
Vampyres	José Ramón Larraz	Anulka Dziubinska, Brian Deacon, Sally Faulkner	Horror	
Who?	Jack Gold	Elliott Gould, Trevor Howard, Joseph Bova	Sci-fi thriller	Co-production with West Germany
Zardoz	John Boorman	Sean Connery, Charlotte Rampling, Sara Kestelman	Sci-fi	

== Documentaries and compilations ==
Title	Director	Cast	Genre	Notes
The Best of Benny Hill	John Robins	Benny Hill	Comedy	Skits from his television show
Heading for Glory	Michael Samuelson	Joss Ackland	Sports Documentary	Official film of 1974 FIFA World Cup
Just One More Time	Maurice Hamblin	John Hamill, Sue Longhurst, Hilary Pritchard	Sex comedy	

== Top Films at the British Box Office in 1974 ==
1. The Sting
2. The Exorcist
3. Enter the Dragon
4. The Three Musketeers
5. Papillon
6. Herbie Rides Again
7. Robin Hood
8. The Great Gatsby
9. Mary Poppins (1964)
10. The Way We Were
11. The Golden Voyage of Sinbad
12. Blazing Saddles
13. Confessions of a Window Cleaner
14. Stardust
15. Gold
16. Last Tango in Paris
17. American Graffiti

== See also ==
- 1974 in British music
- 1974 in British radio
- 1974 in British television
- 1974 in the United Kingdom
