= The Abdication =

1974 British film by Anthony Harvey

- Directed by: Anthony Harvey
- Screenplay by: Ruth Wolff
- Based on: Ruth Wolff (based on her play)
- Produced by: James Cresson; Robert Fryer
- Starring: Peter Finch; Liv Ullmann
- Cinematography: Geoffrey Unsworth
- Edited by: John Bloom
- Music by: Nino Rota
- Color process: Technicolor
- Production company: A Robert Fryer-James Cresson Production
- Distributed by: Warner Bros.
- Release dates: 5 December 1974 (UK); 3 October 1974 (USA)
- Running time: 103 minutes
- Country: United Kingdom
- Language: English

The Abdication is a 1974 British historical drama film directed by Anthony Harvey and starring Peter Finch and Liv Ullmann. It was written by Ruth Wolff based on her 1971 play of the same title. The film's score was composed by Nino Rota. It tells a fictionalized version of the rumored love affair between Christina, Queen of Sweden and Cardinal Decio Azzolino during the former's stay in Rome after abdicating her throne.

== Plot ==
After abdicating her throne and converting to Catholicism, Queen Christina arrives in Rome, where Cardinal Azzolino is appointed to evaluate her and to help her to adapt to life in Rome. They fall in love, but after the Pope's death, Azzolino rejects her to re-embrace his position in the church.

== Cast ==
- Peter Finch as Azzolino
- Liv Ullmann as Queen Christina
- Cyril Cusack as Oxenstierna
- Paul Rogers as Altieri
- Graham Crowden as Barberini
- Michael Dunn as the dwarf
- Kathleen Byron as Queen Mother
- Lewis Fiander as Dominic
- Harold Goldblatt as Pinamonti
- Tony Steedman as Carranza
- Noel Trevarthen as Ginetti
- Richard Cornish as Charles
- James Faulkner as Magnus
- Ania Marson as Ebba
- Franz Drago as Birgito
- Suzanne Huddart as young Christina
- Debbie Nicholson as young Ebba
- Edward Underdown as Christina's father

== Reception ==
The Monthly Film Bulletin wrote: "The credits for The Abdication should carry the rider normally associated with films on contemporary events: 'Any resemblance to real persons living or dead is purely coincidental'. At the risk of pedantry, it must be said that the association between Christina and Azzolino has been distorted, telescoped, romanticised and modernised so that the characters and events portrayed bear scarcely any resemblance to the historical facts. ... Grudgingly, one must admit that the piece just about stands up as a case history: in the seventeenth century, priests were the equivalent of analysts, and subject to similar pitfalls."

Boxoffice wrote: "The production values are excellent, especially Nino Roia's score and cinematographer Geoffrey Unsworth's beautiful, Technicolor images of the not-so-beautiful goings-on. Based on Ruth Wolff's screenplay, the film may produce some moments of unsolicited laughter and offend some sensibilities. Despite the stars' wide following, it may appeal only to a limited audience."

Variety wrote: "The Abdication is a period film in more ways than one. The Ruth Wolff script from her play, based on the 17th century abdication of Queen Christina of Sweden, has been produced by Robert Fryer and James Cresson, and directed by Anthony Harvey, like a trite '30s sob-sister meller, with dainty debauchery and titillating tease straight from '20s women's pulp magazines. Cast is headed by Peter Finch, who keeps getting involved in films like these, and Liv Ullmann, whose expression of winsomely pained bewilderment is wearing mighty thin."

== See also ==
- List of British films of 1974
