= Nandini Mundkur =

Indian pediatrician

- Born: 19 July 1949 (age 76); Tiruvallur, Tamil Nadu, India
- Education: Maulana Azad Medical College Delhi
- Years active: 1986-present
- Known for: Early Childhood Intervention; Child Development
- Medical career
- Profession: Developmental Paediatrics
- Sub-specialties: Developmental Disorders
- Awards: Manthan Asia award in 2008; Rotary Excellence Award in 1998; Ashoka Fellowship Award in 1986; Sathya Gupta Award in 1978

Dr Nandini Mundkur is one of India’s developmental paediatricians who has done pioneering work in the field of early detection and intervention services for developmental disorders.

== Life and career ==
Born in a traditional Tamilian household in Tiruvallur, Tamil Nadu in 1949. She completed her MBBS from Maulana Azad Medical College, New Delhi in 1972 and went on to complete her MD (Doctor of Medicine) in Paediatrics in 1977 from the same college. She practiced as a paediatrician during her early career while pursuing a keen interest in the field of developmental studies. She underwent a course in Vojta’s Early Diagnosis and Therapy in Oct 1989. She is also a Fellow of American Academy of Cerebral Palsy and Developmental Medicine (FAACP and DM).

She currently practices in Bangalore at Jayanagar and Malleshwaram.

== Contributions ==
She spearheaded the awareness-building and creation of early intervention tools in the field of developmental paediatrics in India.
She founded the Centre for Child Development and Disabilities in the year 2006. The centre has been treating children with a wide range of developmental problems in areas of physical, mental, language, and learning abilities, from birth to adolescence. The centre also runs a school that practices early intervention services for children.

Dr Nandini Mundkur is the director of International Children’s Peace Council (ICPC) and her current work in ICPC involves working in Social Emotional Learning programs for children across the country.

As a director at the Sackhumvit Trust, she has undertaken a program "Learn Math with Fun" via satellite for children across rural Karnataka (India).

Dr. Nandini Mundkur co-founded Totsguide a comprehensive online self educated portal aimed to cater to the vision of helping every child with disabilities to attain a better future.

== Awards and recognition ==
Sathya Gupta Award for Social Pediatrics – 1978

- Ashoka Fellowship for Social Entrepreneurship – 1986
- Desha Snehi award for Dedicated Service towards the Welfare of Children –1996
- Rotary Excellence Award for Child Care – 1998
- Women Achievers Award by Bangalore City Ladies Circle on International Women’s day -2002
- Listed as an Indian Genius by the Week Magazine in 2008
- Manthan Award for teaching math to rural children in Karnataka via satellite - 2008

== Recent Projects Undertaken ==
- Dr Nandini Mundkur was a key contributor to the PICAN - PARC Indo-Canada Autism Network in 2010
