= Gemini (English duo) =

English pop duo

- Origin: Telford, England
- Genres: Pop
- Years active: 1995–1996
- Labels: EMI
- Past members: David Smallwood; Michael Smallwood

Gemini were a short-lived English pop duo which consisted of identical twins David and Michael Smallwood. They scored three UK top 40 singles from 1995 to 1996.

== Background ==
The twins were born in 1971 in Smethwick, just outside of Birmingham, where they spent their first few years, before moving to the new town of Telford in Shropshire with their parents in the late 1970s.

== Discography ==
=== Albums ===
- The Difference Is... (1996), EMI

=== Singles ===
- "Even Though You Broke My Heart" (1995), EMI - UK #40
- "Steal Your Love Away" (1996), EMI - UK #37
- "Could It Be Forever" (1996), EMI - UK #38
