= Ageing, Disability and Home Care NSW =

Division of the Department of Family and Community Services

Agency overview
- Formed: 1 June 2009
- Preceding Agency: New South Wales Department of Ageing, Disability and Home Care (June 2009 – April 2011)
- Dissolved: 3 April 2011
- Type: Department
- Jurisdiction: New South Wales
- Headquarters: Sydney
- Employees: 13,600 (2011)
- Annual budget: A$2.5 billion (2011)
- Parent Agency: Department of Family and Community Services
- Child agencies: Home Care Service of NSW; Disability Council of NSW; Ministerial Advisory Committee on Ageing

Ageing, Disability and Home Care NSW (ADHC) was a division of the Department of Family and Community Services in the Government of New South Wales that is responsible for the provision of services to older people, people with a disability, and their families and carers in the state of New South Wales, Australia.

The ADHC division supports approximately 300,000 vulnerable people from its annual budget of A$2.5 billion. It employs more than 13,000 staff. ADHC delivers services and manages 900 non-government and local government service providers that are funded to deliver services such as early intervention, therapy, respite, supported accommodation, case management and post-school programs.

== Structure ==
Nine business streams and two offices deliver ADHC services for older people, people with a disability (particularly those with an intellectual disability) and their carers across six regions in NSW.

- Accommodation Policy and Development: oversees the development and funding of programs and policies to support people with a disability requiring accommodation options
- Respite and Carers: manages the development and funding of programs and policies related to respite services, including respite expansion and integration of a range of respite models
- Community Access: responsible for the development and funding of programs related to access to early intervention and prevention services, community based support (such as community access teams), and participation in the community or workforce. Also provides strategic advice to program and policy areas to enhance access for culturally and linguistically diverse communities.
- Home Care: manages the Home Care Service of NSW by providing strategic policy direction and undertaking program development activities to enhance service quality for clients, including clients with acquired brain injuries, acquired physical disabilities and sensory disabilities
- Aboriginal Service Development and Delivery: develops policies and programs to enhance access to all ADHC programs for Aboriginal communities in NSW. Provides strategic advice to ensure inclusive practices for Aboriginal people in mainstream services
- Large Residential Centres and Specialist Supported Living: develops contemporary, supported living options for current residents of large residential centres, focusing on greater links to the community and participation in community activities for clients
- Sector Development: oversees the development of policies and funding for the non-government sector to ensure quality services, including building the capacity of the service system to better respond to individual needs
- Community Care: oversees the management of the Home and Community Care (HACC) program in NSW collaboratively with the Australian government. Works with key stakeholders to improve community care services for older people, including health
- Prevention and Pathways: develops policies and strategic initiatives to enhance access to mainstream and community supports. Oversees the development of policies and reform agendas to reshape the service system to be person centred and focused on the life span of a person with a disability

Two offices also provide specialist services and support:

- Office of the Senior Practitioner: provides leadership and coordination of services for people with complex needs and challenging behaviour
- Office for Ageing: undertakes social issues research and develops strategic policy on issues that impact older people and their potential to actively participate in the community

== Ancillary functions ==
The agency also funds the NSW Disability Council and the Home Care Service of NSW. These are statutory authorities which report directly to the Minister and are not subject to ADHC direction.

== Complaints about service provision ==
In 2004 under a special report to the NSW Parliament, the New South Wales Ombudsman raised concerns about the way services to children and young people with disability were being provided in NSW. The Ombudsman found that for families seeking support to care for children with disabilities, there was lack of clarity about how to access support and that the service system was fragmented and was characterised by poor coordination of support. A subsequent progress report in 2006 highlighted that while progress had been made to improve systems to support the provision of disability services, there had been no evaluation of the longer-term impacts of the reforms on families requiring those services. In response to these reports, the Iemma government released Stronger Together, a 10-year plan to improve and expand services to people with disability and their families. The first five years were funded through an investment of A$1.3 billion and set out plans to increase capacity of the disability service system by 40 per cent. A subsequent four-year plan, released in February 2007 entitled Better Together, focused on improving 'universal' and 'adapted' services: such as childcare; school; before and after school care; and vacation care.

Between May and August 2010, the NSW Ombudsman consulted with over 300 parents and carers of children with disabilities in order to report against progress at the mid-way point of Stronger Together. A change in government delayed the release of the report. In its assessment of making access to disability services simple, in June 2011 the Ombudsman reported that:

Families told us that in their experience many health practitioners, social workers, and even some ADHC staff, lack knowledge about the specialist disability service system.

....that their calls to ADHC to seek assistance had not been returned, or there had been extensive delays before they received a call back. This included people who had reapplied for ADHC support after previously receiving some assistance. Other families said that they had received a swift response after contacting ADHC, including a home visit and assessment, but had heard nothing afterwards. Some parents and carers told us that they believed that they were on a waiting list for support, but when they contacted ADHC, found out that there was no record of their contact or they had not been added to the relevant waiting list.

...the work has been slow to date, and it is not yet clear whether the actions will address the problems raised by families.
