= Lyall Munro Snr =

Indigenous Australian land rights activist and elder

- Born: 30 September 1931; Tingha, New South Wales, Australia
- Died: 21 May 2020 (aged 88)
- Occupation: Aboriginal Australian community leader
- Known for: Indigenous land rights activism

Lyall Munro Snr (30 September 1931– 21 May 2020), also known as Uncle Lyall Munro Senior, was an Aboriginal Australian activist, leader, and elder, especially known for his advocacy of Indigenous land rights. He was the husband of Carmine "Maggie" Munro, and father of Lyall Munro Jnr.

== Early life ==
Lyall Munro was born on 30 September 1931 in Tingha, New South Wales. A Kamilaroi (or Komeroi; pronounced gomeroi) man, he was a descendant of victims of the Myall Creek massacre in 1838.

He had little formal education, and grew up in a world where racial segregation was practised.

== Activism ==
Munro was an avid advocate for Indigenous land rights throughout his life, interacting with prime ministers and other leaders, and addressed forums on the international stage. He tried to change systems that incorporated systemic racism in Australia, fighting for equality in education and employment. He led a land rights march in Sydney in the 1980s.

He was a strong advocate of truth telling, as a means to forge a new Australian national identity. In a 2014 interview with NSWALC, he said that he felt that the movement needed to be re-energised and emulate the radicalism of the 1970s.

== Career ==
=== Moree ===
Munro and his father were given Australian citizenship in 1947. In 1950 he moved to Moree, New South Wales, as a junior foreman on the railways. At that time, Aboriginal people were not allowed in pubs or clubs or at the Moree swimming baths, or to walk on the sidewalk, or play football in the local team. the local cinema was segregated - Blacks had to sit in the front rows. Munro was allowed to go to pubs and do things that the local Aboriginal people were prohibited from doing, because of having citizenship rights, and started playing football in the local team. He got a lot of advice from the local elders in Moree, and realised that he could help his people attain the same rights as he enjoyed. He later got involved in the Moree Aboriginal Advancement Committee, which was made up of 8–10 Europeans, and became secretary there.

Munro was in Moree when the Freedom Ride led by Charlie Perkins visited the town in February 1965. The purpose of the group of Aboriginal activists and white students, who travelled around rural towns in regional New South Wales in an old bus, was to raise awareness about racial segregation in these towns. The bus arrived in Moree on 19 February. The Freedom Riders collected a number of children from the local mission, including nine-year-old Dan Moree (son of Lyall Snr, brother of Lyall Jnr), and tried to gain entry into the Moree Swimming Baths. Munro told NITV in 2017 that he and the Moree Aboriginal Advancement Committee had been fighting to change the town's segregationist by-laws for years before the Freedom Riders arrived, but not in a confrontational way. "...So we stood and watched in the crowd. It was their day and it was an ugly scene, pretty rowdy, pretty wild — a lot of violence". The event was widely covered by the media at home and internationally, and it caught the attention of the Australian public, proving to be a "seminal moment" in the history of Australia. A public meeting took place in the town afterwards, and the decision was taken to lift the colour bar on the pool.

He served the community in Moree in many ways. He was on the hospital board for 10 years, and held positions in the Moree Aboriginal Sobriety House, Moree Local Aboriginal Land Council, and many housing organisations. He helped to found important local organisations, including the Pius X Aboriginal Corporation, Aboriginal Homecare, and the Aboriginal Employment Strategy.

=== NSW ===
Munro was member of the NSW Aboriginal Lands Trust, which had land passed to it by the government as well as having some bequeathed to it in private individuals' wills. They were successful in winning hunting and fishing rights over some lands, won land, including many of the Aborigines Welfare Board's Aboriginal reserves without having to go to court, by negotiation with the minister. They were successful in getting Kinchela Boys' Home and Cootamundra Girls' Home closed, and also encouraged young people to be initiated into their peoples' cultures. This organisation was sidelined and then abolished, after the NSW Aboriginal Land Council was created in 1977 and the Aboriginal Land Rights Act 1983 made this organisation a statutory body. Munro was not part of this new younger "land rights mob".

In 1969 Munro was elected to the NSW Aboriginal Advisory Council, a body which gave advice to the NSW Minister for Aboriginal Affairs after the Aborigines Welfare Board had been dismantled.

He was a founding member of the NSW Aboriginal Legal Service in the 1970s, and later the Legal Aid Commission, which was based on the ALS model. With the Aboriginal Legal Service, Munro took part in rallies protesting the mining of asbestos by the James Hardie Company on the NSW North Coast at Baryulgil.

=== National ===
He was a member of the National Aboriginal Consultative Committee (NACC, founded 1973), which later became the National Aboriginal Conference (NAC). As an executive member of the NAC, Munro undertook treaty negotiations with the Fraser government (1975–1983).

He contributed to the Royal Commission into Aboriginal Deaths in Custody (1987–1991).

=== International ===
In 1981, Munro played a key role in Australia's hosting of the Third General Assembly of the World Council of Indigenous Peoples (WCIP) in Canberra, and in the 1980s became an executive member of the WCIP.

On 10 December 1993, on International Human Rights Day, during celebrations for the International Year of the World's Indigenous Peoples, Munro called on all levels of government to challenge systemic racism by allowing the voice of Aboriginal Australians to be heard.

Munro was involved in discussions with Jose Ramos Horta seeking East Timor independence in the 1990s.

=== NSW ===
He was an inaugural member of the NSW Aboriginal Housing Office (established 1998) and the AHO Regional Aboriginal Housing Committee.

In 2000, Munro worked hard to achieve the erection of a memorial to the victims of the Myall Creek massacre, near Bingara, as well as getting the site and memorial heritage-listed on both the NSW State Heritage Register and the National Heritage List.

== Death and legacy ==
Munro died on 21 May 2020. He was given a state funeral on Saturday 12 July 2020 at Moree. Around 650 people attended, and the crowd was addressed by his son Lyall Jnr and local member for the Northern Tablelands, Adam Marshall, who represented the Premier of New South Wales.

His contribution to his local community, as well as causes relating to all Aboriginal and Torres Strait Islander people, was wide-ranging and extraordinary. The 2020 chair of NSWALC, Anne Dennis, said that his dedication to land rights would be one of his greatest legacies.

== Personal life ==
Munro and his wife of 63 years, Carmine Munro, known as "Maggie", who predeceased him, had 12 children. They had first met when they were children, but years passed before they saw each other again, at the Gunnedah showgrounds in 1948. They eloped to Moree in 1950, the year in which their first child, Paula, arrived. Their other children were: Lyall Jnr (born 1951), Danile ("Dan"), Keith, Julie, Selena, Jennifer, Lloyd (in 2021 vice-chair of the Moree Local Aboriginal Land Council), Elizabeth, Andrew, William, and Alma.

Lyall Munro Snr was survived by 9 children, 45 grandchildren, 122 great-grandchildren and 28 great-great grandchildren. One estimate put his direct descendants as numbering more than 220.

== Recognition ==
In 2002, Munro was a joint recipient of the National NAIDOC Aboriginal and Torres Strait Islander Male Elders of the Year Award.

In 2013 he was given the Aboriginal Justice Award by the Law and Justice Foundation of NSW.

A couple of months after his death, in August 2020, seven federal senators moved that the Australian Senate should honour the life of Munro in parliament.

A photograph of the Munros, entitled "Mr and Mrs Lyall Munro" was included in a photographic exhibition by Indigenous photographer and filmmaker Michael Riley, A common place: Portraits of Moree Murries, created in 1990. Smaller prints are held by the State Library of New South Wales in Sydney. and National Gallery of Australia in Canberra.

== Confusion with Lyall Jnr ==
Note that several sources with a summary biography say that Lyall Snr was a founding member of the Aboriginal Housing Company (AHC). However, there is no corroborating evidence in the more detailed sources that he was involved in the founding of AHC, and it is likely that there has been confusion with his son Lyall Jnr (who, with his wife Jenny Munro, was involved in the founding of the AHC) (Note: A report about a March 2017 meeting in Redfern about the new Pemulwuy Project said that Lyall Munro Jnr was "the sole surviving member of the [original 1972] group of eight".) There may also have been confusion with the NSW Aboriginal Housing Office, of which he was an inaugural member.

Some sources say that he was involved in the Aboriginal Medical Service in Redfern, but according to quite a comprehensive overview of the first 20 years of that organisation by Gary Foley, neither he nor Lyall Jnr is mentioned.
