= Carmine Munro =

Aboriginal Australian community leader

Carmine "Maggie" Munro
- Born: Carmine May Smith; 8 May 1931; Moree, New South Wales
- Died: 29 December 2010 (aged 79)
- Known for: Australian Aboriginal elder and leader

Carmine "Maggie" Munro (born Carmine May Smith; 8 May 1931 – 29 December 2010) was an Aboriginal Australian elder who lived in Moree, New South Wales. Munro was a community leader and confidante and was well known as a supporter of human rights for Aboriginal people, and is also known for founding "The Granniators", a group of elderly Aboriginal women who worked for their community.

She was married to Lyall Munro Snr, and one of their sons is Lyall Munro Jnr, both also Aboriginal rights activists.

== Early life and education ==
Carmine May Smith was born on 8 May 1931 in an Aboriginal camp in Moree, the second of three girls born to Raymond Smith, a boundary rider, and Mary Jane French. Her mother died when she was a toddler and her father remarried. The new union gave Maggie a further 12 more brothers and sisters.

According to her Sydney Morning Herald obituary, "As a child, she and sister Beryl helped their father, who worked on Pullaman Station, in the task of maintaining fences. Beryl also helped break in the horses but Maggie was afraid of them - a fear she wouldn't conquer until later in life".

Munro attended Moree Mission School but finished at primary level, as Aboriginal children were not permitted to attend the local high school. Fifty years after leaving her primary education behind, Munro returned to study, taking courses in woodwork and upholstery at Moree TAFE.

She worked with local families in the area as a domestic servant, a cook at the Gwydir Boarding House and also as a shearers' cook at various stations, including Terlings. Its owner, Sinclair Hill, was a firm supporter of the Aboriginal people of the area and he and Munro became lifelong friends. She worked at the McMaster Ward in the Moree District Hospital, which was reserved for Aboriginal people.

== Activism and community service ==
It was when she was 16, that Munro left Moree for Sydney, gravitating to the Aboriginal community in Redfern. The Redfern community was the centre of urban Aboriginal politics in New South Wales. Munro worked in a nearby ice cream factory in Chippendale.

After marrying Lyall Munro around 1950, who would go on to become one of the pillars and elder statesmen of the Australian Aboriginal community before his death in May 2020, the couple were part of every essential protest, decision and action for Aboriginal rights for the next 50 years. The Munros were particularly involved in Indigenous land rights. Their son Lyall Jnr also became well-known in the movement, while Maggie stayed in Moree tending to local community issues. She fostered many children, was an active member of the school's parent and child association, and was a committed member of the football club auxiliary. Both she and Lyall Snr were members of the local Aboriginal Advancement Committee, a body which was made up of 8–10 Europeans

The Granniators became one of Munro's lasting legacies. Founded when Munro was 74, the group of Aboriginal grandmothers worked for their community, cooking, babysitting, fostering, clothing and mothering local children. She also worked closely with local police on issues of juvenile crime.

== Recognition ==
In 1993, she was awarded the local National Aboriginal and Islander Day Observance Committee (NAIDOC) Murri of the Year Award.

== Personal life and family ==
Carmine first met Lyall Munro Snr when they were children, but years passed before they saw each other again, at the Gunnedah showgrounds in 1948. The pair became inseparable and soon after, ran away to Moree – where Lyall worked as a junior porter for the railways – and eloped.

Their children were: Paula (born 1950), Lyall Jnr (born 1951), Danile ("Dan"), Keith, Julie, Selina, Jennifer, Lloyd (in 2021 vice-chair of the Moree Local Aboriginal Land Council), Elizabeth, Andrew, William, and Alma.

She often won first prize at the Moree show for her cooking prowess, especially scones and damper, as well as prizes for sewing. According to an obituary published in The Sydney Morning Herald, "She steadfastly refused to get a sewing machine, creating everything by hand and often staying up all night to complete a garment. Once, when the dresses for a local wedding didn't arrive from Sydney in time, Munro sewed them by hand, too".

Munro died in Moree Hospital on 29 December 2010. Her funeral was held on 8 January 2011 at the Moree Memorial Hall. She was survived by her husband Lyall, and 10 of her children (Keith and Jennifer had died earlier), as well as 70 grandchildren, 74 great-grandchildren and three great-great grandchildren.
