= Nandini Goud =

Indian artist

Nandini Goud (born 1967) is an Indian painter and printmaker from Hyderabad, India. She received various awards and fellowships such as Junior Fellowship for painting from the Department of Culture of the Government of India for 1998 to 2000 and National Scholarship in 1995.

== Biography ==
Nandini Goud is the daughter of senior artist Laxma Goud and was born in 1967 in Medak, Andhra Pradesh, India. She did her Bachelor's in Painting and master's degree in Printmaking from the Faculty of Fine Arts at the M.S University in Baroda.

== Works ==
Goud's work depicts and captures typical street living in hyderabad, social life of rural people along with their domestic animals namely cats, goats etc.,. Her works also portrays urban descriptions focussing on interiors of households such as vases of flowers, fruits on the table, and makeup equipment etc.

In her own words of Nandini Goud, she says "My effort to come to grips with the aesthetic issues involved in painting the Indian city focused mainly on the role of space in pictorial organization".

== Exhibitions ==
Her paintings were exhibited along with Indian legends such as M.F. Husain, Shamshad Husain, and Laxma Goud such as Parampara, Feminine Muse, Curiosity Gallery.

- Art Alive Gallery, Delhi, INDIA in 2007
- View Exhibition Emerging India at Art Alive Gallery
- Guild Art Gallery in 1998
- Vadehra Art Gallery, New Delhi in 1995
- Renaissance Art Gallery, Bangalore in 1994
- Gallery Espace, New Delhi in 1992
