= Nanini =

Nanini may refer to:

- Joe Nanini (1955-2000), American drummer
- Giovanni Maria Nanino (c. 1543–1607), Italian composer also known as Nanini
