= Follow That Dog =

1974 British television comedy series

Follow That Dog is a British television comedy which aired during 1974. It was produced by Southern Television, and starred Norman Rossington, Patsy Rowlands, Anthony Dawes, Nigel Rhodes and Janet French. All six episodes are missing, believed lost.
