= 1974 United Kingdom general election =

There were two general elections held in the United Kingdom in 1974:

- February 1974 United Kingdom general election
- October 1974 United Kingdom general election
