= Early childhood intervention =

Support and educational system for very young children

Early childhood intervention (ECI) is a support and educational system for very young children (aged birth to six years) who have been victims of, or who are at high risk for child abuse and/or neglect as well as children who have developmental delays or disabilities. Some states and regions have chosen to focus these services on children with developmental disabilities or delays, but early childhood intervention is not limited to children with these disabilities.

The mission of early childhood intervention is to assure that families who have at-risk children in this age range receive resources and supports that assist them in maximizing their child's physical, cognitive, and social/emotional development while respecting the diversity of families and communities.

== Definition ==
Early intervention is a system of coordinated services that promotes the child's age-appropriate growth and development and supports families during the critical early years. In the United States, some early intervention services to eligible children and families are federally mandated through the Individuals with Disabilities Education Act. Other early intervention services are available through various national, regional, and state programs such as Crisis Nurseries and Healthy Start/Healthy Families America. Starting with a partnership between parents and professionals at this early stage helps the child, family and community as a whole.

Early intervention services delivered within the context of the family can aid with the below through the services of physical, occupational, and speech therapy. Some examples include:

- Help prevent child abuse and neglect
- Mitigate the effects of abuse and neglect
- Improve parenting skills
- Strengthen families
- Improve the child's developmental, social, and educational gains;
- Reduce the future costs of special education, rehabilitation and health care needs;
- Reduce feelings of isolation, stress and frustration that families may experience;
- Help alleviate and reduce behaviors by using positive behavior strategies and interventions; and
- Help children with disabilities grow up to become successful, independent individuals.
- Assistance with technological devices, counseling, and family training.

The earlier children at high risk for abuse or neglect and children with disabilities receive assistance, the likelihood for both short term and long term benefits to occur increases. Short-term benefits of early intervention include primary school readiness, increased learning and school performance, better health and nutrition, as well as a safer and more supportive home environment. Long term benefits of early intervention include reduction in instances of crime, drug use and teen pregnancy as children grow into adolescents and young adults.

== History ==
Early childhood intervention came about as a natural progression from special education for children with disabilities (Guralnick, 1997). Many early childhood intervention support services began as research units in universities (for example, Syracuse University in the United States and Macquarie University in Australia) while others were developed out of organizations helping older children.

Early childhood education has roots in legislation reaching as far back as 1966 with the Elementary and Secondary Education Act. The legislation provides federal funding to primary and secondary education. The act emphasizes equal access to education, aiming to shorten the achievement gaps between students by providing federal funding to support schools with children from low income families. A more modern form of this act is the No Child Left Behind Act passed in the early 2000s. Then only a few years after the Elementary and Secondary Education Act, the Handicapped Children’s Early Education Assistance Act of 1968 was passed which established 75 to 100 programs to support preschool aged children that are disabled.

Further, in 1972 the Economy Opportunity Act of 1964 was amended to extend Head Start programs. Head Start programs started as services to support children from low income families, the amendment extended the services to support children with disabilities. Head Start programs are the foundation that early childhood intervention was built upon.

In 1975, the Individuals with Disabilities Education Act (previously known as the Education for all Handicapped Children Act) was passed. This was landmark legislation that guaranteed free, appropriate, public education to all students regardless of ability. IDEA is the legislation that guarantees early childhood education programs to children and families.

In the 1990s, many states in the US put into place a program where the child's pediatrician can recommend a child for early childhood intervention screening. These services are usually provided free of charge through the local school district or county, depending on the state.

=== Individuals with Disabilities Education Improvement Act (IDEA) Part C ===
The Part C (originally Part H) program mandates a statewide, comprehensive, multidisciplinary service system to address the needs of infants and toddlers who are experiencing developmental delays or a diagnosed physical or mental condition with a high probability of an associated developmental disability in one or more of the following areas: cognitive development, physical development, language and speech development, psychosocial development, and self-help skills. In addition, states may opt to define and serve at-risk children. The therapies provided by IDEA can be found in the home, child care, early head start, and community settings such as the county. Commonly cited factors that may put an infant or toddler at risk of developmental delay include low birth weight, respiratory distress as a newborn, lack of oxygen, brain hemorrhage, infection, and prenatal exposure to toxins through maternal substance abuse. Other factors, not commonly cited but often experienced are language delays due to factors such as deafness, autism, learning disabilities, or severe psychosocial issues (i.e. severe neglect).

Every state now implements Part C fully. The original legislation provided a five-year phase-in period for states to develop their comprehensive system of service for the affected population. Although IDEA does not mandate states' participation in Part H/C, powerful financial incentives from the federal government have led every state to participate. States were provided extensions of the 5-year period as they struggled with the logistic, interagency, and financial demands of developing a statewide system. To ensure a coordinated approach to service delivery and financing of services, federal regulations of Part C require that states develop interagency agreements that define the financial responsibility of each agency and impanel a state interagency coordinating council to assist the lead agency in implementing the statewide system. Regulations also prohibit the substitution of funds and reduction of benefits once the plan is implemented in each state (United States Department of Education, 1993). As states and federal territories (for example, Guam, Puerto Rico, the Virgin Islands) began to plan for implementation of P.L. 99-457 and later IDEA, their first obligation was to designate an agency that would provide leadership in the planning and administration of the state's comprehensive system. In 1989, 22 states or territories had the department of education as lead agency, 11 others had the department of health, another 9 had the department of human services, and the remaining states had combined departments or departments of mental health or developmental disabilities (Trohanis, 1989).

== Meeting developmental milestones ==
Every child is unique, growing and developing at his or her own rate. Differences between children of the same age are usually nothing to worry about. However, for one child in 10, the differences can be related to a developmental delay. The sooner these delays are identified, the quicker children may be able to catch up to their peers.

Identifying these delays early is also important because the most critical time for brain development is before the age of three. The brain develops in an experience-dependent process. If certain experiences are not triggered, the pathways in the brain relating to this experience will not be activated. If these pathways are not activated, they will be eliminated.

=== Milestones birth to three ===
At age one month most children can:

- Raise their heads slightly when lying on their stomachs
- Briefly watch objects
- Pull away from a blanket on their face

At age three months most children can:

- Lift their heads and chest while lying on their stomachs
- Make cooing sounds
- Follow a moving person with their eyes
- Smile back at someone

At age six months most children can:

- Sit with minimal support
- Roll from their back to their stomach
- Respond to their name by looking

At age 12 months most children can:

- Pull themselves up to stand and take steps with hands held
- Follow with their eyes in the direction in which a person are pointing
- Start a game of peek-a-boo, imitate clapping hands, point to show a person something
- Say two or three words on a regular basis
- Sit up when prompted

At age 18 months most children can:

- Walk backwards
- Walk down stairs holding an adult's hand
- Use words and gestures (like taking someone by the hand) to get needs met
- Perform simple pretend play like talking on the phone, feeding a stuffed animal

At age 24 months most children can:

- Kick a large ball
- Describe an injury or illness to an adult ("bumped my head")
- Show interest in other children by offering them a toy or taking their hand

At age 32 months most children can:

- Pretend to be an animal or favorite character
- Talk about the past/future
- Answer "what", "where", and "who" questions easily
- Imitate drawing a horizontal line after being shown
- Hold a crayon with 3 fingers

However, if a child is premature it is not correct to compare them to this list of developments to be achieved by the age of three. The chronological age of a premature child needs to be considered. That is, if a child is 12 weeks old but was born four weeks early, then the child's chronological age is only eight weeks. This is the age that needs to be considered when comparing the child's developments to others.

Recent discovery has also suggested that in some premature children the delays do not appear until the age of three, suggesting that all premature children receive early intervention therapy rather than just those who appear to have developmental delays.

== Early intervention services ==
The following is a list of what early intervention can provide:

- Assisting technology devices and services – equipment and services that are used to improve or maintain the abilities of a child to participate in such activities as playing, communication, eating or moving
- Audiology – identifying and providing services for children with hearing loss and prevention of hearing loss
- Family training – services provided by qualified personnel to assist the family in understanding the special needs of the child and in promoting the child’s development
- Medical services – only for diagnostic or evaluation purposes
- Mental health counseling for children, parents, and families
- Nursing services – assessment of health status of the child for the purpose of providing nursing care, and provision of nursing care to prevent health problems, restore and improve functioning, and promote optimal health and development. This may include administering medications, treatments, and other procedures prescribed by licensed physician.
- Nutrition services – services that help address the nutritional needs of children that include identifying feeding skills, feeding problems, food habits, and food preferences
- Occupational therapy – services that relate to self-help skills, feeding and food tolerance, dressing and undressing, toileting, adaptive behavior and play, social skills, and sensory, motor, and postural development
- Parent training; parenting education, also referred to as embedded coaching
- Physical therapy – services to prevent or lessen movement difficulties and related functional problems.
- Psychological services – administering and interpreting psychological tests and information about a child’s behavior and child and family conditions related to learning, mental health and development as well as planning services including counseling, consultation, parent training, and education programs.
- Service coordination – someone who works in partnership with the family by providing assistance and services that help the family to coordinate and obtain their rights under the early intervention program and services agreed upon in the Individual Family Service Plan
- Social work services – preparing an assessment of the social and emotional strengths and needs of a child and family, and providing individual or group services such as counseling or family training
- Special instruction – includes designing learning environments and activities that promote the child’s development, providing families with information, skills, and support to enhance the child’s development.
- Speech-language pathology – services for children with delay in communication skills or with motor skills such as weakness of muscles around the mouth or swallowing. The power of early intervention, lays in the fact that the paediatric brain is most ‘plastic’ (meaning: flexible or capable of change) during the first three years of life.
- Therapeutic early childhood classrooms, providing developmentally appropriate learning environments, and staffed by trained early interventionists
- Vision services – identification of children with visual disorders or delays and providing services and training to those children

== Providing early childhood intervention ==
Robin McWilliam (2003, 2010) developed a model that emphasizes five components: Understanding the family ecology through eco-maps; functional needs assessment through a routines-based interview; transdisciplinary service delivery through the use of a primary service provider; support-based home visits through the parent consultation; and collaborative consultation to child care through individualized intervention within routines. "These services are to be provided in the child's natural setting, preferably at a local level, with a family-oriented and multi-dimensional team approach".

A very common form of early intervention provided is a therapist coming into the home and playing with the child using toys. Large toys such as wagons and puzzles can be used to aid the child in muscle development while toys like bubbles can be used to aid in sensory development. With services like this the care provided is in a neutral setting at a local level and the family and therapist team are present. Experts in early intervention have, however, discredited this form of early intervention in favor of using the visit to build the capability of the child's natural caregivers (e.g., parents), so the child receives much more "intervention" throughout the week than would be received in a single visit, directly from the professional.

Early childhood intervention may be provided within a centre-based program (such as Early Head Start in the United States), a home-based program (such as Portage in the United Kingdom), or a mixed program (such as Lifestart in Australia). Some programs are funded entirely by the government, while others are charitable or fee-paying, or a combination.

An early childhood intervention team generally consists of teachers with early childhood education training, special education specialists, speech and language pathologists, physical therapists (physiotherapists), occupational therapists, and other support staff, such as ABA (applied behavioral analysis) providers, music therapists, teacher aides/assistants, and counselors. A key feature of early childhood intervention is the transdisciplinary model, in which staff members discuss and work on goals even when they are outside their discipline: "In a transdisciplinary team the roles are not fixed. Decisions are made by professionals collaborating at a primary level. The boundaries between disciplines are deliberately blurred to employ a 'targeted eclectic flexibility'" (Pagliano, 1999).

Goals are chosen by the families through the annual or biannual Individual Family Service Plan (IFSP), which evolves from a meeting where families and staff members talk together about current concerns, as well as celebrating achievements. McWilliam's routines-based interview, in which caregivers talk about the details of the child's and family's day, is used in many parts of the world to develop the family's chosen goals.

A significant application of the transdisciplinary model, was developed by Relief Nursery, Inc. of Eugene, Oregon, an early pioneer of the model. Founded in 1976 as a local child abuse prevention effort, Relief Nursery became a pilot project under the National Crisis Nurseries Act of 1986 Working with early childhood experts Christine Chaille and Lory Britain and representatives from the local community, the approach was refined into a new comprehensive family services model, so successful that it was replicated at more than 30 sites in the State of Oregon. The model attracted national and international interest, recognized in 2002 by the U.S. Department of Health and Human Services, Office on Child Abuse and Neglect (OCAN), as an "innovative program with noteworthy aspects", and becoming part of a project sponsored by Holt International in 2008, to introduce the model into Ukraine as an alternative to their existing orphanage model.

== Early hearing detection intervention ==
The early hearing detection intervention (EHDI) mandates each state and territory in the United States to implement programs providing newborn screening, diagnostic and early intervention. Programs are publicly funded and provided for free or at reduced cost for any eligible child. This serves all children with hearing loss. Screening occurs prior to hospital discharge. If an infant does not pass the newborn screening will receive diagnostic evaluation before three months of age. They will be enrolled in early intervention if hearing loss is diagnosed.

Early intervention services are designed to support babies and young children with developmental delays and disabilities or at risk for a developmental delay. This includes their families and caregivers. A child under the age of three may be eligible for early intervention services if the child is diagnosed with a medical condition, not reaching age-appropriate milestones, or at risk for a developmental delay due to medical or social history. Depending on the child's needs, services may include speech therapy, physical therapy, and other types of services. Early intervention has also been shown to be especially beneficial for children with autism spectrum disorder, where starting therapy before age five can improve developmental outcomes. Each child will receive an Individualized Family Service Plan, covered by IDEA.

=== History ===
The EDHI program has developed in efficiency over the past few decades. The Center for Disease Control (CDC) initially began mandating EDHI programs in each state in 2000, when the first funds were authorized from Congress to support its development. The CDC claimed deaf and hard of hearing (DHH) children to be endanger of potential developmental emergencies and thus it was necessary that they get diagnosed as early after birth as possible. There have been a variety of organizations involved in establishing early diagnosis and intervention treatment, many of which are branches under American Academy of Pediatrics (AAP). After 17 years, EDHI federally mandated through a law passed on October 18, 2017, when President Trump signed the Early Hearing Detection and Intervention (EHDI) Act (PL 115-71). In this act, three main U.S. Department of Health and Human Services (HHS) agencies, the (CDC), Health Resources and Services Administration (HRSA), and the National Institutes of Health (NIH), are required to work together to maintain, build up, and support EDHI programs in all the territories of the US.

Progress in diagnostic efficiency after EDHI program implementation from 2000 to 2017 has seen substantial increase. In 2000, only 855 infants were identified as DHH, but as of 2016 the number has increased to over 6,000 infants a year. In 2017, 65.1% of the 6,537 children with detected hearing loss were enrolled in early childhood intervention programs. Though these statistics do not prove all diagnosed children get services, there is still a drastic increase of children who were able to access them between 2000 and 2017.

=== Parent access ===
Once a parent decides that they want their child to be evaluated for early intervention, they can reach out directly to their state's early intervention program. A list of these contacts for each state is available on the CDC website. If their child is over the age of three, the parent can contact their local public elementary school to request for their child to be evaluated for special education preschool.

The cost of early childhood intervention services can range greatly depending on the needs of the child, but it is not uncommon for these services to cost thousands of dollars. Each state offers different programs to help make these costs affordable for parents. These programs take financial information such as income, rent/mortgage payments, household size, and medical expenses to calculate the maximum value that the family is capable of paying. Most programs also offer a way for families to request a reevaluation if they believe the amount is too high. In some instances, families can receive full coverage for their child's early intervention services.

== Criticism ==
Some criticism of early childhood intervention asserts that growing up is different for each individual, depending on genetic endowments and environmental circumstances. However, one thing is common to everyone: the process, in order to take full advantage of the species' potential, must be a natural ripening, without interference from clumsy intruders. Some critics of early childhood intervention say that no one should push healthy children to learn any skill or academic discipline before they choose to do so of their own accord.

The family-centered ethos in early intervention programs, however, supports families' desires for their children to be engaged, independent, and social in their everyday routines. The choice is therefore not the child's but the parents', who are urged to follow the child's lead.

In the US state of Georgia, the program "Babies Can't Wait" was put in place to help parents find early intervention therapy. The program works the same as many government-mandated early intervention programs in that it first evaluates the child for free, and then deems what services the child needs to receive.

However, this particular program has received two major criticisms, for its timeline and for the collaborative model it provides. The program has 45 days to evaluate the child, then has another 45 days to develop a plan and provide services for the child. Due to limited providers working with "Babies Can't Wait", the deadline is sometimes not met and the services are not provided.

"Babies Can't Wait" works on a collaborative model, with medical professionals communicating with each other about the services each child needs. A physical therapist would consult with a speech therapist, and then the physical therapist would provide the child with speech therapy as part of the child's physical therapy session, instead of the child having an additional therapy session with the speech therapist.

== See also ==
- Special Assistance Program (Australian education)
- Adverse childhood experiences
