= Natasha Desborough =

Natasha Desborough (born 21 June 1974, Wimbledon, London) is a radio presenter, author, DJ, and radio and television producer. She has written three books: Parental Advisory Manual, Weirdos Vs Quimboids and Weirdos Vs Bumskulls.

== Early life and education ==
Desborough attended Reigate College, Reigate, Surrey, from 1990 to 1993.

== Career ==
She started her music career as Programme Controller for Crystal Palace's own radio station, Palace Radio 1278AM, where she was responsible for producing, scripting and coordinating the station's programming. From there she moved to Invicta FM, in Kent.

She then moved to the alternative music station in 2003, Xfm London where she fronted the late night Chill Out Room before moving onto then the Breakfast Session alongside celebrity guests such as Iain Lee from RI:SE. During her time there, she also co-presented the Sunday morning show, writing and co-presenting with Perrier Award nominated comedian Jimmy Carr.

Desborough is also a radio producer, having produced all her own shows on XFM.

Desborough left BBC 6 Music on 28 September 2008.

=== TV appearances ===
Her appearances on TV have included

- "The Richard & Judy Show" (Channel 4)
- "Top 100 Singles" (Five)
- "Liquid News" (BBC Three)
- "Celebrities Behaving Badly" (Sky)
- She has narrated "Army Wives" for Channel 4, "California Escorts" and "Real Sex" for Channel Five. She has been the voice of campaigns for the BBC, Hit 40 UK, HMV, Sony, MTV, Doc Martens, Tampax and Cadbury's.

== Personal life ==
Natasha lives in Croydon with her husband Jim, and sons Oscar and Wilfie.

== Books ==
- Desborough, Natasha, Parental Advisory Manual, Bantam Press, Oct 2009. ISBN 978-0-593-06418-4

== See also ==
- BBC 6 Music
- BBC
