= Lisa Francesca Nand =

Lisa Francesca Nand (born 24 July 1974) is a travel writer and broadcaster who worked on BBC Radio before becoming a co-presenter on the Ian Collins show on the UK radio station Talksport in 2006. She became the first female presenter on TalkSPORT.

She is a regular guest on radio and television as well as being known for creating and presenting online travel videos.

In 2015 she directed the authored documentary, First Heartbeat, about her experiences with miscarriage, broadcast on TLC UK and Discovery International around the world.

She is a patron of the charity Thyroid UK.
