= Francis (surname) =

Francis is an English surname of Latin origin. The name means "French man" Notable people with the surname include:

- Alun Francis (born 1943), Welsh conductor
- Anna Belle Francis (born 1978), Singaporean entertainer and singer
- Anne Francis (1930–2011), American actress
- Arlene Francis (1907–2001), American actress
- Armet Francis (born 1945), Jamaican-born photographer based in London
- Barrington Francis (born 1965), Jamaican/Canadian boxer of the 1980s and 1990s
- Beckie Francis (born 1965), American basketball coach
- Black Francis (born 1965), American musician
- Bowden Francis (born 1996), American baseball player
- Charles Asa Francis (1855–1934), American politician from New Jersey
- Clare Francis (born 1946), British author
- Claudius Francis (born 1959), Saint Lucian politician
- Connie Francis (1937–2025), American pop singer
- Daeshon Francis (born 1996), American basketball player in the Israeli Basketball Premier League
- Damien Francis, (born 1979), English-born Jamaican footballer
- Dannen Francis (born 2004), Antiguan footballer
- Danusia Francis, (born 1994), British gymnast
- David Rowland Francis (1850–1927), American politician, Mayor of Saint Louis, Governor of Missouri, U.S. Secretary of the Interior
- Dennis Francis (born 1956), Trinidad and Tobago diplomat
- David Francis (disambiguation)
- Dick Francis (1920–2010), British jockey-turned-novelist
- Dillon Francis, (born 1987), American electronic musician and disc jockey
- Eddie Francis, (born 1974), Canadian politician
- Esme Francis, Cornish musician
- Eustace Francis, Dominican politician, Speaker of the House of Assembly
- Felix Francis, (born 1953), British author
- Freddie Francis (1917–2007), English cinematographer and film director
- Genie Francis (born 1962), American actress
- Gerry Francis (footballer, born 1933) (1933–2025), English-Canadian footballer
- Gerry Francis (born 1951), English footballer and manager
- Isabel Elizabeth Francis (1991–2022), Singaporean murder victim
- Jacobi Francis (born 1998), American football player
- James Francis (disambiguation)
- Jane Francis (born 1956), Winner of Polar Medal, 2002
- Ja'Vier Francis (born 2003), American basketball player
- Jeff Francis (born 1951), Major League Baseball pitcher
- Joseph Francis (disambiguation), several people named Joe or Joseph Francis
- K. T. Francis (1939–2013), Sri Lankan cricket umpire
- Kathryn Francis (died 2005), American politician
- Kay Francis (1905–1968), American actress
- Kevin Francis (disambiguation), several people named Kevin Francis
- Leigh Francis (born 1974), British comedian
- Leslie Francis, American philosopher
- Leslie E. Francis (1871–1957), American politician from Iowa
- Louise E. Francis (1869–1932), American journalist
- Mark Francis (disambiguation)
- Mary Francis (born 1948), British businesswoman
- Mary Margaret Francis (1924–2000), British author
- Melissa Francis (born 1972), American television journalist and former child actress
- Michael Kpakala Francis (1936–2013), Liberian Roman Catholic archbishop
- Nellie Griswold Francis (1874–1969), American civil rights activist
- Noel Francis (1906–1959), American actress of the stage and screen
- Norman Francis (1931–2026), American academic, president of Xavier University of Louisiana
- Percy Francis (footballer) (1875–1947), English footballer
- Peter D. Francis (born 1934), American politician from Washington
- Ranganathan Francis (1920–1975), Indian hockey player
- Robert Francis (actor) (1930-1955), American actor
- Robert Francis (barrister) (born 1950), British barrister specialising in medical law
- Rohin Francis, British cardiologist
- Ron Francis (born 1963), Canadian professional ice hockey centerman
- Roy Francis (c. 1919–1989), British rugby league footballer and coach
- Russ Francis (1953–2023), American football player
- Sage Francis (born 1977), hip-hop artist
- Sam Francis, (1923–1994), American painter and printmaker
- Sam Francis William Francis (civil engineer), American football player
- Samuel Kensinger Francis (born 1974), fitness trainer
- Samuel T. Francis (1947–2005), American columnist
- Sebastian Francis (born 1951), Malaysian Catholic cardinal
- Steve Francis (born 1977), American professional basketball player
- Thomas Francis, Jr. (1900–1969), American physician, virologist, and epidemiologist
- Trevor Francis (1954–2023), English footballer
- Sir William Francis (1926–2025), British civil engineer
- William T. Francis (1870–1929), American diplomat

== See also ==
- Francis (given name)
- Francis (disambiguation)
