= Dead Cert =

Dead Cert may refer to:

- Dead Cert (novel), a 1962 novel by Dick Francis
- Dead Cert (1974 film), a 1974 crime film based on the novel
- Dead Cert (2010 film), a 2010 supernatural horror film
