= Macalester College Eco-House =

General information
- Location: 200 Vernon Street, St. Paul, Minnesota

Website
- https://www.macalester.edu/ecohouse

Macalester College Eco-House is one of the many specialty housing options available to students at Macalester College after their first year. The Eco-House is the project of Chris Wells, assistant professor of environmental studies, and began in fall 2007 with the move-in of four student residents. In the summer of 2007, prior to its opening, the Eco-House underwent significant "green" renovations in order to make the 1950s-era house livable and to decrease its environmental footprint.

== The vision for the project ==
The Eco-House is intended as a place for students to "explore practical green-living lifestyles, to test the effectiveness of new green technologies, and to work with community partners to develop better resources on green renovations and sustainable lifestyles". The house is also intended as a laboratory for testing the cost effectiveness and energy use of a variety of technologies and home renovations. Eco-House residents also host events, and workshops to draw attention to environmental issues on campus and to share energy-saving and environmentally friendly living techniques with the Macalester-Groveland community.

== Renovations ==
The renovations for the Macalester College Eco-House took place in the summer of 2007 and were conducted with a budget of $50,000 with the intent of making both affordable changes and including a few showcase items for the house that could be used as examples of environmentally friendly renovations for the college community.

These renovations included:

- Additional wall and attic insulation
- Stone coated steel shingling with an average lifespan of around 70 years
- Solar heated hot water from a solar panel on the garage roof
- Compact fluorescent lighting
- SolarTube skylight in the bathroom
- Aerated sinks and showerhead
- Dual-flush toilet
- Energy Star rated appliances (refrigerator, dishwasher, washer, dryer )
- Paperstone countertops in the kitchen and bathroom
- Glass block basement windows

== Community Garden ==
The grounds of the Macalester College Eco-House includes a student-designed edible forest garden. The garden is managed by the student organization MULCH and features environmentally friendly native plants chosen to attract beneficial insects, promote soil fertility and provide food. The Eco-House is home to Macalester's flock of backyard chickens, also tended to by MULCH.

== Press Coverage ==
The Eco-House has also been the subject of much attention in local media, with large media outlets such as the Star Tribune newspaper and Minnesota Public Radio News both doing stories on the project, as well as The Villager and a variety of Macalester College publications.
