= David J. Francis =

David J. Francis may refer to:

- David J. Francis (academic), American psychologist
- David J. Francis (actor) (born 1970), Canadian actor, director, producer, editor and screenwriter
- David Francis (film archivist) (born 1935), British film archivist
- David J. Francis (politician) (born 1965), Chief Minister of Sierra Leone
