= Pilgrim Baptist Church (Saint Paul, Minnesota) =

Historic church in Minnesota, United States

- U.S. National Register of Historic Places
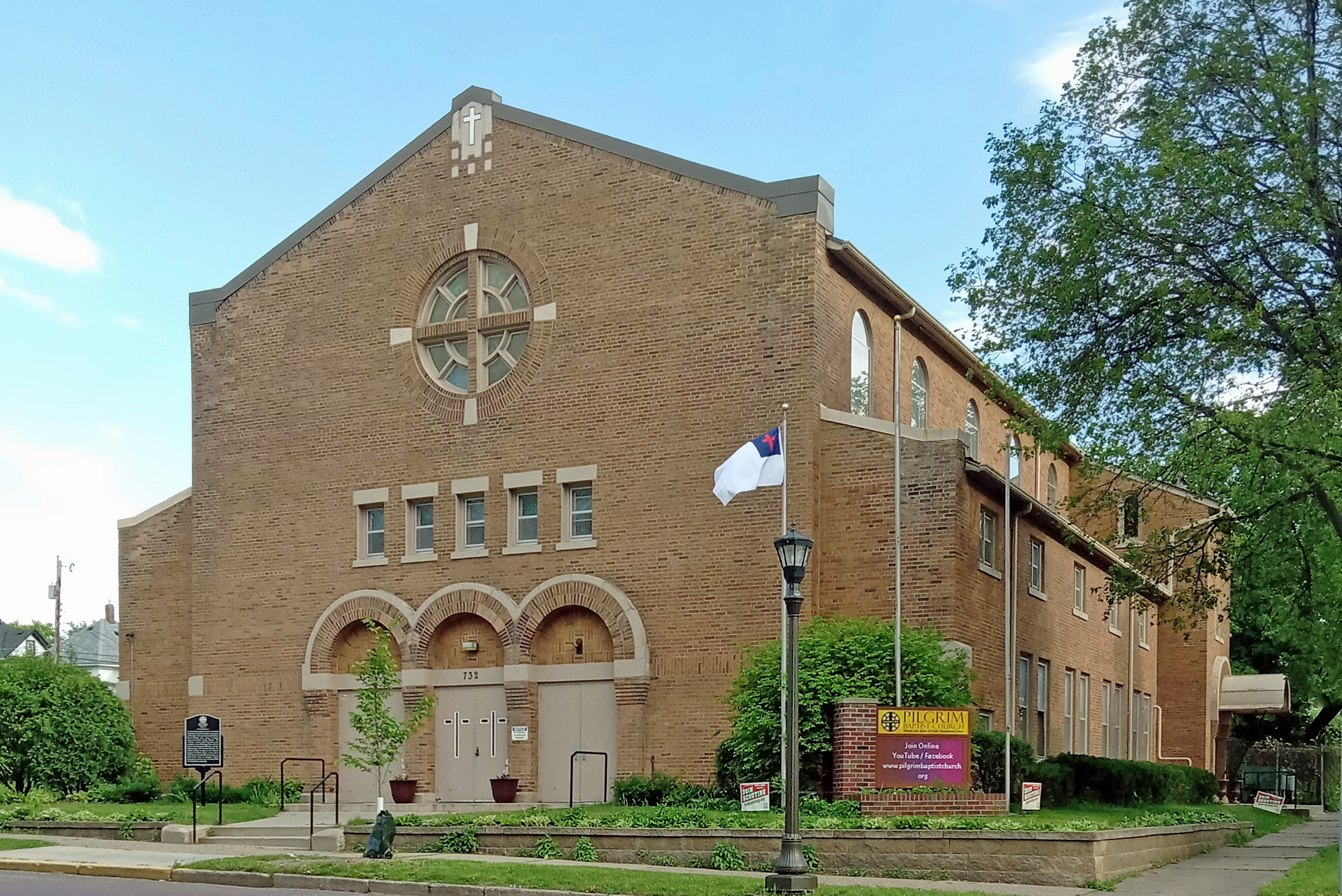
- Pilgrim Baptist Church from the north-northwest

- Location within Minnesota Location within the United States
- Location: 732 Central Avenue W. Saint Paul, Minnesota
- Coordinates: 44°57′10″N 93°7′52″W
- Built: 1928
- Architect: L. W. Baumeister
- Architectural style: Romanesque Revival
- NRHP reference No.: 91000438
- Added to NRHP: April 16, 1991

The Pilgrim Baptist Church is a historic Black Baptist church and congregation in Saint Paul, Minnesota. It is located at 732 Central Avenue West in Saint Paul. It was the first predominantly Black congregation in Minnesota. The church was founded by Reverend Robert Thomas Hickman and a group of freedom seekers from Boone County, Missouri.

The current building, which is listed on the National Register of Historic Places, was built in 1928. It was Minnesota's first location on the National Park Service's National Underground Railroad Network to Freedom.

== History ==
The Pilgrim Baptist Church was founded by Robert Thomas Hickman, who was born into slavery in Boone County, Missouri around 1830. While enslaved, he worked as a rail splitter and cut logs for building fences. His enslaver taught him to read and Hickman became a preacher amongst the other enslaved individuals in the area. His wife, Minta Spencer-Hickman, was born around 1837. They married and she and their children were enslaved by another owner who lived near Robert. Both slaveowners died before the Civil War.

Robert, Minta, and their children tried to flee north out of Missouri in the spring of 1863. They made it to a contraband camp in St. Louis and were brought up the Mississippi River to Fort Snelling on a steamboat called the Northerner. The boat arrived on May 6, 1863 with about 125 people. Other sources claim the family were smuggled up the Mississippi River on the steamer War Eagle with the help of Union Soldiers and the Underground Railroad, while a third story has the group on a makeshift boat that slowly fell apart on their journey. Once reaching Fort Snelling, local officials moved to separate the group, sending some to Duluth, some to Hastings, and allowing some to settle in St. Paul.

Travelers on the Northerner made up some of the charter members of the Pilgrim Baptist Church, including the Hickman family, Fielding and Adeline Combs, Henry and Charlotte Moffit, John B. and Elizabeth Trotter, and Giles Crenshaw. The group settled in St. Paul and initially held church services in private homes.

By the fall of 1863, the group began renting a space from Good Samaritans in the Good Templars, a temperance based society at the Concert Hall Building on Third Street in St. Paul. Later, they petitioned the trustees of First Baptist Church of St. Paul to purchase in trust a lot worth $200 for them to build a meeting place. Between 1864 and 1866, Hickman and his followers worshiped under Hickman's direction as part of the First Baptist Church of St. Paul.

On November 15, 1866, Pilgrim Baptist was formally organized. It was the first predominantly Black church in Minnesota. They celebrated with a baptismal service on the shores of the Mississippi. The church itself was incorporated in 1870.

First Baptist Church of St. Anthony gave a portion of their to-be-razed building to the Pilgrim's congregation to be used in their construction of the new church. The Pilgrim Baptist Church built their first dedicated structure in 1872. Hickman became officially licensed to preach, ordained, and became the congregation's official minister in 1878.

In 1886, the congregation moved locations. Hickman retired and was succeeded by Rev. Bird J. Wickins.

Congregation members included Nellie Francis and William T. Francis who were active in the 1890s and 1910s and both sang in the church choir. In 1909, Nellie helped persuade Andrew Carnegie to donate an Estey organ to the church through his charitable foundation.

The congregation grew in the 1910s and a new church was built at 723 W. Central Avenue in 1928. This brought the church into the heart of the Rondo neighborhood. Rev. Lee Ward Harris, the minister at the time, denounced segregation to the Minnesota House of Representatives.

== Community impact ==
The congregation was active in civil rights in the St. Paul area. They were involved in founding the local chapter of the NAACP in 1913. They were also involved in founding a local chapter of the Urban League in 1923 and the Hallie Q. Brown House in 1929. The church also helped launch the Western Appeal, one of the first Black-owned newspapers in the country.

Due to the church's location, Pilgrim Baptist members advocated for their community when I-94 displaced thousands of Rondo residents. They requested a pedestrian bridge over the interstate, which led to the creation of one of the interstate's few pedestrian crossing points. Pilgrim Baptist’s Rev. Floyd Massey, while working with the Rondo–St. Anthony Improvement Association, is crediting with stopping the construction of an elevated freeway. Additionally, the church played a key role in reopening Maxfield Elementary School following the construction of the highway.

In the 1970s, the church opened the Benjamin E. Mays School which later became part of the St. Paul Public Schools. They also founded "Directions for Youth" which was an outreach agency for young runaways.

Today, the church raises money for emergency assistance, runs a food and clothing shelf, and a prison ministry at the Ramsey County Workhouse.

== Legacy ==
The church celebrated its 150th anniversary in June 2013.

In 2023, the church was added to the National Park Service's National Underground Railroad Network to Freedom, a directory of where freedom seekers hid or found refuge. It was the first Minnesota site to be added.

== Notable congregation members ==
- Nellie Francis
- William T. Francis
- Frank Boyd
- S. Edward Hall

== See also ==
- National Register of Historic Places listings in Ramsey County, Minnesota
