= Whip Hand =

Crime novel by Dick Francis

- First edition cover
- Author: Dick Francis
- Language: English
- Series: Sid Halley series
- Genre: crime novel
- Publisher: Michael Joseph
- Publication date: 8 October 1979
- Publication place: United Kingdom
- Media type: Print (Hardcover)
- Pages: 253
- ISBN: 0-7181-1845-6
- OCLC: 8552143
- Dewey Decimal: 823/.914 19
- LC Class: PR6056.R27 W5
- Preceded by: Odds Against
- Followed by: Come to Grief

Whip Hand is a crime novel by Dick Francis, the second novel in the Sid Halley series. The novel received the Gold Dagger Award for Best Novel of 1979, as well as the Edgar Award for Best Novel of 1980. Whip Hand is one of only two novels to have received both awards (the other being John le Carré's The Spy Who Came in from the Cold).

The cover of the first edition features actor Mike Gwilym, who played Halley in the Yorkshire Television adaptation The Dick Francis Thriller: The Racing Game, in costume as Halley.

== Plot ==
The protagonist Sid Halley is an ex-jockey turned detective who lost his left hand due to an earlier racing accident and subsequent beating by thugs. He is approached by Rosemary Caspar, a trainer's wife, to look into problems at her husband's racing stables. Horses which did extremely well as two-year-olds are unexpectedly failing as three-year-olds. In addition, Sid Halley's ex-father-in-law, Charles, asks Sid to try to find a man who has conned Sid's ex-wife Jenny and left her facing a possible jail sentence over a fake charity. Sid is also approached by both Lord Friarly, a racehorse owner and syndicate member, and Lucas Wainwright, the head of the security service at the Jockey Club, to look into certain syndicates and how they got through the Jockey Club's checking process.

== Publication history ==
- 1979, London: Michael Joseph ISBN 0-7181-1845-6, Pub date 8 October 1979, Hardback
