= Macalester-Groveland, Saint Paul =

Macalester-Groveland is a neighborhood and city planning district in Saint Paul, Minnesota in the United States. It is Saint Paul Planning District 14. The neighborhood is bounded by the Mississippi River on the west, Summit Avenue on the north, Ayd Mill Road on the east, and Randolph Avenue on the south. The district contains Macalester College and the smaller neighborhood of Tangletown, as well as many homes, restaurants, and shops.

Neighborhood residents are more likely to be politically liberal. The neighborhood has a suburban feel, but it is a densely built environment with restaurants, coffee shops, and local bars. Most of the neighborhood's housing stock was built before 1939 and around 60% of residents own their homes. As of the 2018–2022 American Community Survey, around 84% of residents were white.

Snelling Avenue, Minnesota Highway 51, is a major north-south street in the community. There are transit stops on the Metro A Line in the neighborhood at Grand Ave, St. Clair Ave, and Randolph Ave. The city of Saint Paul has been encouraging high-density housing along transit corridors and Snelling Avenue in particular.

== History ==
The Grandview Theater in 1978.

The neighborhood began to develop in the 1890s as streetcars were extended to the area. Other areas began filling in during the 1920s, resulting in different development patterns. The development in the 1920s and after was later than in other parts of Saint Paul, and resulted in buildings more oriented around private automobile travel and commercial areas mostly at public streetcar corners.

A subarea of the neighborhood is called Tangletown for its curvy streets that contrast with the rest of the city's grid. In the 1880s Macalester College moved to what was then Saint Paul's western suburbs. Lots in Tangletown were intended to fund the endowment for Macalester, but that plan failed. The area developed gradually with many different architectural styles.

== Notable residents ==
In the 1920s, hundreds of neighborhood residents attempted to intimidate African-American civil rights activist Nellie Griswold Francis and her husband William T. Francis from moving into the neighborhood. Charles Schulz grew up in the neighborhood as well as in nearby Union Park and Highland Park.
