= Nerve (Francis novel) =

1964 novel by Dick Francis

- First edition
- Author: Dick Francis
- Language: English
- Genre: Mystery
- Publisher: Michael Joseph
- Publication date: 1964
- Publication place: United Kingdom
- Preceded by: Dead Cert
- Followed by: For Kicks

Nerve is the second novel by British mystery novelist Dick Francis, published in 1964.

== Synopsis ==
Robert Finn watches a fellow steeplechase jockey blow his brains out in the parade ring at Dunstable races, just before a race. As Finn and the other jockeys cope, some better than others, with the stress of their jobs, other incidents lead him to conclude that someone is trying to destroy the lives of jockeys all over England.

Finn is not the average jockey. The only child of famous virtuoso musicians, and the single family member to not be gifted musically, he has followed a different path than that of his family's vocation. He has inherited other skills that will help him as he unravels a sad and warped trail. And he has been a remarkably successful jockey for a man with only 2 years' experience.

Soon, Finn is the next target. A losing streak that lasts weeks threatens his job until he takes it upon himself to do a little sleuthing and uncovers the identity of the culprit. Now, Finn wants his revenge, and he takes his time setting it up.
