= Dai Francis =

Dai Francis may refer to:

- Dai Francis (trade union leader) (1911–1981)
- Dai Francis (singer) (1930–2003)

== See also ==
- David Francis (disambiguation)
