= Scott Antony =

British actor (born 1950)

Scott Antony (born 29 June 1950 in Newcastle upon Tyne) is a British former actor best known for playing the role of Henri Gaudier-Brzeska in Savage Messiah (1972).

He was chosen to play the lead straight from drama school. Director Ken Russell said Antony "was chosen out of 300 actors I saw because he was the only one I thought could pick up a hammer and hit a stone. Being an artist is a physical thing."

He went on to star in the Woodfall film, Dead Cert (1974), directed by Tony Richardson and also featuring Judi Dench.

He retired from acting to move into the culinary arts.

== Select credits ==
- Savage Messiah (1972)
- So It Goes (1973) (TV series)
- Cheri (1973) (TV series)
- Between the Wars (1973) (TV series)
- The Mutations (1974)
- Dead Cert (1974)
