= In the Frame =

1976 novel by Dick Francis

First edition (UK)

In the Frame was Dick Francis' fourteenth novel, published by Michael Joseph in 1976. Its US release was by Harper and Row in 1977.

== Plot ==
Horse artist Charles Todd arrives on a visit to his cousin Donald just as the police are investigating the murder of Donald's wife in the course of a burglary, during which all the artworks in his home were stolen as well as a valuable stock of wine. Charles stays to look after Donald, who is traumatised into inaction and besides is being treated as a suspect by the police.

At a race meeting later, he runs into the rich and flamboyant widow Maisie Matthews. who asks Charles to come and paint the ruin of her mansion, which recently burned to the ground. When he goes to inspect the site, he disturbs a man called Greene who claims he is inspecting the site for the insurance company. Charles' suspicions are raised when he learns that Greene was a sham and that Maisie had recently bought a horse painting by Alfred Munnings during a visit to Australia. Donald had also recently bought a Munnings in an Australian gallery, while on a buying trip for his wine business. Charles begins to wonder whether the paintings were forgeries which a gang steals back or, in Maisie's case, attempts to destroy (when they cannot find it) by burning down her house.

With expense money provided by Maisie, Charles goes to stay in Sydney with a former art school friend, Jik Cassavetes, and his recent wife Sarah. The shop where Maisie bought her painting was only on a short lease and is already closed. However, there is a Melbourne branch of the company so Charles, Jik and Sarah go to that city for the annual races and to follow up leads. There they encounter other members of what looks increasingly like a highly organised criminal enterprise.

Knowing by now that the gang is ruthless and violent, and that they have been tipped off whom to seek, Charles and his friends catch a flight to Alice Springs, where the art firm has another branch. There Charles encounters the expert forger Harley Renbo, but before he can do much more, he is seized by two thugs and thrown off a balcony. Surviving this, he flies with his friends back to Melbourne. Using the Melbourne Cup race as a distraction, they burgle the art shop and come away with evidence that the gang are engaged in a long-established international operation.

They now fly to New Zealand in order to warn another collector whose name appears in the stolen files to be vigilant. By this time Charles has contacted the English police and asked them to follow up the leads with which he has provided them. Barely escaping yet another attempt on his life, Charles flies back to Australia with his friends, while the gang and their leader are arrested. Back in England, he ties up loose ends.

== Development ==
Dick Francis constructed his plots to a recognisable formula. His protagonist has an interest in horse racing, meets injury with a phlegmatic acceptance of pain and is loyal to relations and friends. In this case Charles investigates the burglary out of compassion, to relieve the pressure on his traumatised cousin. Often, a talkative elder woman is featured in the novels; here it is Maisie, who plays more than a comical role, providing the initial clue and the finance to cover Charles' expenses.

Though Francis' wife Mary always refused to be credited as co-authoring his novels, it became known that her share in them was often crucial. In the case of In the Frame she took up painting and so was able to provide all the technical detail for Charles and Jik's artistic work.

The novel was broadly adapted for a TV movie in 1989. However, the detection is credited there to David Cleveland, the Jockey Club investigator of Slay Ride, and the action takes place in Germany, not Australia.

== See also ==
Book audio online, read by Tony Britton]
