= Sid Halley =

John Sidney "Sid" Halley
- First appearance: Odds Against
- Last appearance: Dark Horse (written by Francis' son Felix)
- Created by: Dick Francis
- Portrayed by: Mike Gwilym; Mick Ford

In-universe information
- Gender: Male
- Occupation: Jockey, Private detective
- Family: Jenny Roland (first wife, divorced); Charles Roland (ex father-in-law); Marina Van Der Meer (second wife); Saskia Halley (daughter by second marriage)
- Nationality: British

Sid Halley (John Sidney Halley) is a fictional character in four Dick Francis novels, Odds Against, Whip Hand, Come to Grief, Under Orders and three follow-up books by Felix Francis, Refusal, Hands Down and Dark Horse. He is a former British jump racing Champion Jockey and private detective. He is the only central character to appear in more than two Francis novels, and one of only two to appear more than once. (The other is Kit Fielding of Break In and Bolt.)

== Character biography ==
=== Early life and career ===
Halley was born out of wedlock. His mother's fiancé died at age 20 (though a newspaper report in Come to Grief says he was 19) only three days before the wedding in a fall from a ladder, whilst working overtime as a window cleaner. Eight months after his father's death Halley was born. Halley's mother, aged 19 at his birth, came from the Liverpool slums and later worked as a biscuit packer. Halley's boyhood home was Liverpool. His mother died when Halley was 15 of an obscure kidney ailment. Knowing she was dying, she pulled Halley from grammar school and apprenticed him to a Newmarket racing trainer, so that he would have a home and someone to turn to after her death.

Halley's master taught him to train horses and encouraged him to invest the money that he earned. He also educated Sid in speech, manners, and the realities of life. Sid was a rising jockey by the time he completed his indentured service, and was reputed to have earned a small fortune on the stock market.

Halley became a successful jockey, rising to become champion jockey — a status he held for "five or six years". During his early career, before he achieved success, he married Jenny Roland, daughter of retired Rear Admiral Charles Roland. The marriage produced no children and was never a great success. While Halley was Champion Jockey his wife gave him an ultimatum: racing or her. Halley chose racing. They separated while Halley was still racing and a divorce followed between the events of the first two books. Despite this Halley had become close to Charles Roland (after a very rocky start) and the friendship persisted.

=== Injury and detection career ===
Halley was injured in an accident whilst riding: during a racing fall over a hurdle fence, the hoof of another horse landed directly on his left hand. The racing plate (a type of horseshoe especially made for race horses) had worn thin, slicing through the skin, muscle, ligaments and bones of the hand, rendering it unusable and therefore ending his racing career. Despite several operations the hand had little utility.

No longer able to race, Halley was hired as an operative by a well-known private security/investigative firm called Hunt Radnor Associates, and is working there as Odds Against opens. Still pitying himself over the loss of the profession he loved, and the loss of a wife he loved but couldn't get along with, he does not work very hard at being a detective, but a case involving unexplained accidents at a venerable racetrack awakens his interest, and, when he brings the case to a successful conclusion, he discovers he might be as good an investigator as he was a jockey. But at a cost.

In the course of his investigation, his hand was further damaged by the villain he was trying to expose, resulting in its amputation.

Throughout most of the rest of the series Halley struggles to come to terms with the loss of his hand, and to master the prosthetic device that has replaced it.

In the first sequel, Whip Hand, Halley has been fitted with an artificial left hand. He and his partner, Chico Barnes, no longer working for Hunt Radnor Associates, have opened their own detective agency, and, in quick succession, are hired to investigate three unrelated cases. In the course of this novel, Halley is threatened with the loss of his remaining hand.

By Come to Grief, Halley's agency has become a sole proprietorship, after Barnes, newly married, leaves the firm at the behest of his bride. Halley becomes a public pariah when, in the course of an investigation into several shocking cases of animal cruelty, he uncovers evidence that the responsible party is a well-known, and extremely popular, TV sports journalist.

In the fourth book in the series, Under Orders, Sid marries Marina Van Der Meer.

Refusal, though written in 2013 by Dick's son Felix, carries the sur-title "A Dick Francis Novel." In it the now 47-year-old Halley is father to a six-year-old daughter, Saskia, and has given up detective work. In order to protect his family from the attentions of a crooked and violent bookmaker he is reluctantly drawn back to his old profession. During the novel the possibility of a hand transplant is mooted and the book ends with Halley being told that donor hand has become available.

Halley returns Hands Down (2022) and Dark Horse (2025), also written by Felix. In Hands Down, Sid struggles with a rough patch in his and Marina's marriage while also investigating a friend's disappearance. In Dark Horse, he comes to the aid of a rising Irish jockey after she is accused of killing her abusive ex-boyfriend.

== List of Novels ==
- Odds Against (1965)
- Whip Hand (1979)
- Come to Grief (1995)
- Under Orders (2006)
- Refusal (2013) (written by Felix Francis)
- Hands Down (2022) (written by Felix Francis)
- Dark Horse (2025) (written by Felix Francis)

== Adaptations ==
Sid Halley was played by Mike Gwilym in a six episode television series, The Racing Game. The series was produced by Yorkshire Television and aired between November 1979 and January 1980. The first episode was a brief adaptation of Odds Against; the other episodes were original stories created for the series by various writers. In his autobiography, The Sport of Queens, Dick Francis says he owes the existence of Whip Hand to Mike Gwilym's performance. The actor so closely matched Francis's concept of Halley that he became interested in writing a second book about the same man. It was filmed mainly in Yorkshire at the Pontefract, York and Wetherby racecourses predominantly.

Mick Ford appeared in The Racing Game, in the role of Halley's sidekick Chico Barnes. Ford later played Halley himself in a five part BBC Radio dramatisation of Whip Hand, broadcast in December 1991.

== Awards ==
Odds Against earned Dick Francis his first nomination for an MWA Edgar Award for Best Novel.

Whip Hand won both the MWA Edgar and the CWA Gold Dagger for Best Novel, one of only two novels ever to win both awards, the other being John le Carré's The Spy Who Came in from the Cold. Come to Grief also won an Edgar for Best Novel, making Halley the only detective-hero in fiction to be featured in two novels that won the Edgar for best novel, and the only one to headline a series for which every single entry (to that point) was an Edgar finalist in the Best Novel category.

The fourth book, Under Orders was noteworthy for not being nominated for an Edgar, ending Francis's streak.
