= David Francis =

David Francis may refer to:

- David Francis (author) (born 1958), Australian novelist and lawyer
- Panama Francis (David Francis, 1918–2001), American drummer
- David R. Francis (1850–1927), American politician
- David Hywel Francis (1946–2021), Welsh politician
- David Francis (cyclist), former member of the USA Cycling team
- Dave Francis (born 1941), Ohio State Buckeyes football player
- David Francis (film archivist) (born 1935), former curator of the UK's National Film and Television Archive
- David J. Francis (actor) (born 1970), Canadian actor and director
- David J. Francis (academic), American psychologist
- David J. Francis (politician) (born 1965), Sierra Leonean politician

== See also ==
- Dai Francis (disambiguation)
