= Michael Garrett (composer) =

British composer (born 1944)

Michael Garrett (17 June 1944 – 23 August 2023) was a British composer, born in Leicestershire. He was active in composing and performing for more than fifty years. His many works extend across a wide range of styles.

== Career ==
He wrote many symphonic, chamber and instrumental works as well as vocal music and wrote extensively for the piano. During the 1960s his early compositions incorporated experiments with serial techniques; and in the years since then composed music in a more melodic vein. He began studying the piano and composing in 1956 and studied at The Guildhall School of Music and Drama, London where he won a scholarship to study with Edmund Rubbra (1961–1964). He also studied piano with Frank Merrick who was himself a pupil of Theodor Leschetizky. He composed music for two Ken Russell films Women in Love (1969) and Savage Messiah (1972). He worked as composer and pianist in the theatre, gave piano recitals of jazz and experimental music, and also composed a jingle for the Scottish Gas Board.

He gave the first performances in the UK of John Cage's "Concert for Piano and Orchestra", which was conducted by John Cale before he moved to the US and joined The Velvet Underground with Lou Reed.

Garrett was musical director for Lindsay Kemp's mime company, which included David Bowie and toured Britain and Europe. He was music director on Lindsey Kemp's film 'Pierrot In Turquoise' during which he plays piano. He composed music for television documentaries and was bandleader on the liner Canberra on a world cruise. He recorded in Paris with jazz trumpeter Bill Coleman and drummer Art Taylor. The album 'Bill Coleman Plus Four' (JCD196) remains available as a download.

== Personal life ==
Born in Leicester, he studied at the Guildhall School of Music and lived and worked in London for the early part of his musical career. He taught music and piano. He married Jane Brogan who was from Edinburgh and with whom he had a daughter, Clare born 2.10.1968. In 1974 he married Anne Maitland Hunter (now Robertson) Both these marriages ended in divorce. He lived in Edinburgh for two main periods and in London from 1975 until 2001 London. On returning to Edinburgh in 2001, he created and regularly performed and directed The Michael Garrett Ensemble in concerts of his own and other music. His recent works include a setting of Robert Burns' "Braw lads o' Gala Water" for soprano and piano. His "Refrain de danse oriental" for wordless soprano is often accompanied by the composer wearing a fez. In his late sixties he met Ishbel Maltman whom he married in 2014 when he was 70. Ishbel survives him.

== List of works ==
=== Orchestral ===
- The Spirit of Modernity, Op. 8a (1980–1985)
- A New Renaissance, Symphonie Concertante for woodwind, strings and percussion, Op. 9 (1973–1974)
- Xystus for string orchestra, Op. 19 (1982)
- Xystus II for small orchestra, Op. 25 (1984)
- Xystus V for string orchestra, Op. 36 (1985)
- Symphony No. 2, Op. 37 (1985)
- Concert Prelude No. 1 "London Lights", Op. 40 (1985)
- Symphony No. 3, Op. 46 (1986)
- Concert Prelude No. 2 "A Subterranean Holiday", Op. 55 (1987)
- Symphony No. 4, Op. 56 (1987)
- Vivaldi in Nebraska, 12 Symphonies Concertantes, Op. 60 (1985–1988)
- Symphony No. 5, Op. 61 (1988)
- Concert Prelude No. 3 "Camaraderie", Op. 68 (1989)
- Dream Suite "The Far Islands", Op. 69 (1989)
- Symphony No. 6, Op. 75 (1989)
- Symphony No. 7, Op. 82 (1990)
- Fantasia No. 1 for string orchestra, Op. 93 (1992)
- Fantasia No. 2 for string orchestra, Op. 111 (1996)
- Symphony No. 8, Op. 121 (1997–1998)
- Notturno No. 1, Op. 125 (1999)
- Notturno No. 2, Op. 130 (1999–2000)
- Concerto for small orchestra, Op. 143 (2002–2003)
- Symphony No. 9, Op. 144 (2002)
- Symphony No. 10, Op. 148 (2002–2003)
- Preludio for string orchestra, Op. 149 (2003)
- Symphony No. 12 "Le Retour du Printemps" in 1 movement, Op. 200
- Fantasia No. 3 for string orchestra, Op. 215 (2009)
- Symphony No. 13, Op. 225 (2009)

=== Concertante ===
- Sinfonia for piano and orchestra, Op. 7 (1965–1966)
- Fantasie Elegie for piano and orchestra, Op. 24 (1984)
- Piano Concerto No. 1 in D♭ major, Op. 28 (1984)
- Piano Concerto No. 2, Op. 41 (1985)
- Piano Concerto No. 3, Op. 57 (1987–1988)
- Violin Concerto No. 1, Op. 62 (1988)
- Four Pieces for violin and small orchestra, Op. 64 (1988)
- Violin Concerto No. 2, Op. 78 (1990)
- Piano Concerto No. 4, Op. 81 (1990)
- Xystus VII for piano and string orchestra, Op. 90 (1992)
- Fantasia-Burlesque for piano and orchestra, Op. 102 (1994)
- Fantasia for cello and orchestra, Op. 104 (1994)
- Phantasy-Capriccio for violin and orchestra, Op. 112 (1996)
- Piano Concerto No. 5, Op. 127 (1999)

=== Chamber music ===
- Variation for violin and piano, Op. 2 (1960–1961)
- 3 Elegies for string quartet and piano obligato, Op. 3 (1961)
- String Trio No. 1, Op. 5 (1962)
- String Quartet, Op. 5a (1st version); arrangement of String Trio No. 1 for string quartet
- A New Renaissance for piano solo, brass and percussion, Op. 9a (1973–1974)
- String Quartet No. 11, Op. 5b (2nd version) (1982); arrangement of String Trio No. 1 for string quartet
- Fantasia for trombone and piano, Op. 22 (1983–1984)
- Partita for string quartet, Op. 30 (1984)
- Variation II for violin and piano, Op. 31 (1981–1984)
- Xystus III for brass octet, Op. 32 (1984–1985)
- Suite for viola and piano, Op. 34 (1985)
- Xystus IV for woodwind, strings, tambourine and percussion, Op. 35 (1984–1985)
- Phantasy, Suite for cello and piano, Op. 38 (1985)
- 3 Pieces for flute and piano, Op. 42 (1985)
- Xystus VI for string quartet, Op. 43 (1985)
- Suite for violin and piano, Op. 48 (1986)
- Several Apertures for clarinet and piano, Op. 50 (1986)
- String Trio No. 2, Op. 51 (1986)
- 3 Fantasies for string quartet, Op. 63 (1988)
- Partita "Several Opportunities" for 2 oboes, English horn and 2 bassoons, Op. 65 (1989)
- 3 Pieces for viola and piano, Op. 70 (1989)
- Sonata No. 1 for violin and piano, Op. 71 (1989)
- Sonatina for oboe and piano, Op. 72 (1989)
- String Quartet No. 2, Op. 73 (1989)
- Sonatina for trumpet and piano, Op. 74 (1989)
- Sonatine for bassoon and piano, Op. 76 (1989)
- Sonata for cello and piano, Op. 77 (1989–1990)
- String Quartet No. 3, Op. 80 (1990)
- Xystus VII for string quartet, Op. 87 (1991)
- Xystus X for string quartet and piano, Op. 92 (1992)
- Piano Trio No. 1, Op. 101 (1993–1994)
- Phantasy, Variations for alto saxophone with flute, clarinet, violin, cello and piano, Op. 103 (1994)
- String Quartet No. 4, Op. 105 (1994)
- Sonata for violin and piano, Op. 107 (1995)
- Piano Trio No. 2, Op. 110 (1996)
- A Summer Idyll for flute and piano, Op. 123 (1998)
- Sontas No. 3 for violin and piano, Op. 129 (1999)
- String Quartet No. 5, Op. 131 (2000)
- Sonata for cello and piano, Op. 132 (2000)
- Notturno e fantasia for violin and piano, Op. 135 (2001)
- String Quartet No. 6, Op. 139 (2001–2002)
- Sonata No. 4 for violin and piano, Op. 141 (2002)
- Eglogue, Notturno for clarinet and piano, Op. 155 (2005)
- Three Pieces for cello solo, Op. 159 (2006)
- Promenade en forme de paean for wordless soprano, flute, clarinet, cello and piano, Op. 161 (2006)
- String Quartet No. 7, Op. 164 (2006)
- Poeme-Arabesque No. 1 for violin and piano, Op. 165 (2006)
- 'Prelude and fughetta for flute, clarinet, cello and piano, Op. 166 (2006)
- 2 Pieces for flute and piano, Op. 168 (2006)
- 2 Pieces for clarinet and piano, Op. 171 (2006)
- Poem-Arabesque No. 2 "Toccata Exotique" for violin and piano, Op. 176 (2006)
- Soggiorno nell'isola di thule dove la vita e lenta e felice for cello and piano, Op. 177 (2007)
- Introduction and Round Dance for clarinet (or violin, or flute) and piano, Op. 179 (2007)
- 2 Pieces for flute or violin and piano, Op. 180 (2007)
- Canzona for flute, oboe, clarinet or violin and piano with cello obligato, Op. 182 (2007)
- Variations for clarinet and piano, Op. 184 (2007)
- Aria (A Dream Promenade) for trumpet or flugelhorn and piano, Op. 196 (2008)
- Gala Water for trumpet or flugelhorn and piano, Op. 197 (2008)
- 4 Pieces for violin and piano, Op. 198 (2008)
- Suite Concertante for flute with piccolo, clarinet, trumpet, flugelhorn, violin, cello and piano, Op. 199 (2008)
- Poeme-Arabesque No. 3 for violin and piano, Op. 208 (2008)
- String Quartet No. 8, Op. 210 (2008–2009)
- Poeme-Arabesque No. 4 for violin and piano, Op. 218 (2009)
- Piano Quartet, Op. 219 (2009)
- 3 Pieces for clarinet and piano, Op. 220 (2009)
- 2 Pieces for trumpet and piano, Op. 221 (2009)

=== Organ ===
- Epithalamion I, Op. 203 (2008)
- Epithalamion II, Op. 206 (2008)

=== Piano ===
- 12 Fughettas (Hommage to Hindemith), Op. 1 (1958)
- 4 Extensions, Op. 4 (1962)
- 5 Pieces, Op. 6 (1962–1963)
- The Spirit of Modernity, Op. 8 (1972–1973)
- The Spirit of Modernity, Extracts, Op. 8b (1985)
- The Book of Circe, 100 Pieces in 10 Volumes, Op. 10 (1969–1976)
- 4 Songs without Words for piano 4-hands, Op. 10a (1975)
- Piano Sonata No. 2 Sursum Animus, Op. 11 (1977–1978)
- Piano Sonata No. 3 Petites Images, Op. 12 (1978–1980)
- Miniature Suite, Op. 13 (1978–1980)
- Piano Sonata No. 4 Sonata eclectica, Op. 14 (1981)
- Aux pas 1, 12 Preludes, Op. 15 (1981–1982)
- 7 Symphonic Impressions, Op. 16 (1980–1982)
- Piano Sonata No. 5 An Almanac Gospel, Op. 17 (1982)
- Piano Sonata No. 6 in G major In nominee, Op. 18 (1982)
- Aidos I, Op. 20 (1982–1983)
- Aux pas II, 15 Preludes, Op. 21 (1983)
- Suite for 2 pianos, Op. 23 (1984)
- Aidos II, 10 Pieces, Op. 26 (1983–1984)
- Sontas for piano 4-hands, Op. 29 (1984)
- Suite No. 1 for piano 4-hands, Op. 33 (1985)
- Suite No. 2 for piano 4-hands Suite de salon, Op. 33a (1985)
- Piano Sonata No. 7 Prolation, Op. 44 (1985)
- Aidos III, 15 Preludes and Fugues, Op. 45 (1986)
- Aux pas III, 16 Preludes, Op. 47 (1986)
- Piano Sonata No. 8 Chiaroscuro, Op. 49 (1986)
- Piano Sonata No. 9 Lied von Arbeit, Op. 52 (1986)
- Suite No. 3 for piano 4-hands, Op. 53 (1986)
- Sonata for 2 pianos, Op. 54 (1987)
- Piano Sonata No. 10 An ode to the laconic idiom, Op. 59 (1988)
- Piano Sonata No. 11 Sonata da camera, Op. 66 (1989)
- Aidos IV, 12 Preludes and Fugues, Op. 79 (1990)
- Aidos V, 3 Fantasias, Op. 83 (1990)
- Aidos VI, 3 Fantasias and Toccatas, Op. 84 (1990–1991)
- Aux pas IV, 2 Preludes, Op. 85 (1990–1991)
- Aidos VII, 14 Pieces in the Form of Fughettas, Op. 86 (1991)
- Aux pas V, 5 Preludes, Op. 88 (1991)
- Aidos VIII, 7 Pieces in Canonic Form, Op. 89 (1991–1992)
- Aux pas VI, 10 Preludes, Op. 94 (1992)
- Aux pas VII, 8 Preludes, Op. 95 (1992–1993)
- Aidos X, 5 Pieces, Op. 96 (1993)
- Xystlis XI, Op. 97 (1993)
- Aidos X, 5 Pieces, Op. 98 (1993)
- Revelry, Op. 99 (1993)
- The Spirit of Modernity, Part II for 2 pianos, Op. 102a (1994)
- Partita No. 2, Op. 108 (1995)
- Piano Sonata No. 12, Op. 113 (1997)
- Piano Sonata No. 13, Op. 115 (1997)
- Suite No. 2, Op. 116 (1996–1997)
- Piano Sonata No. 14, Op. 117 (1997)
- Aux pas VIII, Op. 118 (1997)
- 2 Nocturnes, Op. 119 (1997)
- Piano Sonata No. 15, Op. 120 (1997)
- Piano Sonata No. 16, Op. 122 (1998)
- Introduction and Promenade for 2 pianos 8-hands, Op. 128 (1999)
- Piano Sonata No. 17 Seascapes, Op. 133 (2000)
- Piano Sonata No. 18, Op. 138 (2001)
- Berceuse, Introduction and Promenade for piano 4-hands, Op. 140 (2002)
- 3 Night Visuals, Op. 142 (2002)
- Nexus Enantiodromia, 10 Inventions Humoresques, Op. 145 (2002)
- Piano Sonata No. 19, Op. 147 (2002)
- Piano sonata No. 20, Op. 150 (2003)
- Fantasia eclectica, Op. 151 (2003)
- 3 Idylls and Toccatas, Op. 152 (2003–20??)
- Piano Sonata No. 21, Op. 153 (2004–2005)
- Variations MIX "Nozze Strane", Op. 157 (2005–2006)
- Masque Gothique, 2 Pieces, Op. 162 (2006)
- Passacaglia, Op. 169 (2006)
- Miniature Suite No. 2, Op. 175 (2007)
- Mignon for piano 4-hands, Op. 178 (2007)
- Piano Sonata No. 22, Op. 181 (2007)
- Miniature Suite No. 3, Op. 183 (2007)
- Landscapes and Festival, Op. 185 (2007)
- Miniature Suite No. 4, Op. 186 (2007)
- 2 Preludes, Op. 187 (2007)
- Miniature Suite No. 5, Op. 188 (2007)
- Sonatina No. 2, Op. 190 (2007)
- Sonatina No. 3, Op. 191 (2007)
- Due brani in fusione de stile, Op. 193 (2007)
- Mignon II, An Arabesque for piano 4-hands, Op. 194 (2008)
- Gala Water for piano 4-hands, Op. 195 (2008)
- Mignon III for piano 4-hands, Op. 201 (2008)
- Piano Sonata No. 23 Pastoral Variants, Op. 204 (2008)
- Canzona for piano 4-hands, Op. 205 (2008)
- Piano Sonata No. 24 Fantasia-Sonata, Op. 207 (2008)
- Piano Sonata No. 25 Exotic Spirit Winds, Op. 209 (2008)
- Trois esquisses, Op. 211 (2009)
- Chorale and Variations, Op. 214 (2009)
- 2 Pieces, Op. 216 (2009)
- Piano Sonata No. 26, Op. 217 (2009)
- 20 Miniature Pieces, Op. 224 (2009)

=== Vocal ===
- Canticle of the Sun for voices, performed as part of Lindsay Kemp's performance at the Purcell Room
- Three Night Songs for tenor and piano, Op. 58 (1988)
- Prelude for soprano, flute and piano, Op. 100 (1993)
- The Presence of Pan, 3 Songs for tenor and piano, Op. 114 (1996–1997)
- Wanderings I, Cycle of 8 songs for mezzo-soprano and piano, Op. 124 (1998)
- Wanderings II, Cycle of 8 songs for mezzo-soprano and piano, Op. 126 (1998–1999)
- 2 Songs for tenor or soprano and piano, Op. 134 (2000)
- Wanderings III, 4 Songs for baritone or contralto and piano, Op. 137 (2001)
- Of the moon, Wind and Sky, 3 Songs for baritone or contralto and piano, Op. 146 (2002)
- Searching for Spring, Song for high voice and piano, Op. 154 (2005)
- Wanderings IV, 4 Songs for voice and piano, Op. 160 (2006)
- Promenade en forme de paean for wordless soprano, flute, clarinet, cello and piano, Op. 161 (2006)
- Wanderings V, 2 Songs of the Night for voice and piano, Op. 163 (2006)
- Refrain de danse oriental for wordless soprano, flute, clarinet, cello, piano and percussion, Op. 167 (2006)
- Music Comes for voice and piano, Op. 170 (2006)
- Listening for voice and piano, Op. 172 (2007)
- 2 Songs for voice and piano, Op. 174 (2007)
- Refrain de danse oriental for wordless soprano, flute, clarinet, violin, cello, piano, large tom-toms or congas, tambourine and small gong, Op. 189 (2007)
- Braw lads o' Gala Water for soprano and piano, Op. 192 (2007)
- Wanderings VI, 6 Songs for voice and piano, Op. 202 (2008)
- Wanderings VII, 4 Songs for tenor or soprano and piano, Op. 222 (2009)
- Bagatelle: "Souls Renewed", Song for voice and piano, Op. 223 (2010)

=== Choral ===
- Symphony No. 1 for large orchestra, mixed chorus, off stage brass and male voice choir, Op. 27 (1984)
- 3 Choruses for unaccompanied six-part male voice choir, Op. 39 (1985)
- Three Night Pieces for unaccompanied choir, Op. 67 (1989)
- Xystus IX for orchestra with female choir, Op. 91 (1992)
- Xystus XII for piano and orchestra, women's choir and rock percussionist, Op. 106 (1993–1995)
- Dream Suite No. 2 "Into the Dawn" for soprano, contralto, tenor, baritone, choir and orchestra, Op. 109 (1995–1996)
- Night Song and In to Dawn – omitting one trumpet and one harp, Op. 109a (1996)
- Evocations, 7 Songs for soprano, baritone, choir and orchestra, Op. 136 (2000–2001)
- Symphony No. 11 for soloists, choir and orchestra, Op. 156 (2003–2005)
- 2 Pastorales for a cappella choir, Op. 158 (2006)
- The Healing Moon, 2 Pieces for mixed choir a cappella, Op. 173 (2006–2007)
- Three Scenes for unaccompanied choir, Op. 213 (2009)
