= Felix Francis =

British crime writer

- Born: 1953 (age 72–73)
- Education: University of London
- Occupations: crime writer, physics teacher
- Known for: writing with his father
- Notable work: Gamble
- Parents: Dick Francis (father); Mary Margaret Francis (mother)

Felix Francis (born 1953) is a British crime writer. He is Dick Francis’ younger son.

Felix studied physics and electronics at London University, and then started a 17-year career teaching Advanced Level physics at three schools, the last seven as head of the science department at Bloxham School in Oxfordshire, before quitting to look after his father's affairs. He lives in Oxfordshire. From 1993 to 2005, he was a director and deputy chairman of World Challenge Expeditions Ltd. Felix is also a former governor of Winchester House Prep School, and is a governor of Malvern College.

Dick's wife, Mary Francis, assisted with both the research and the writing of many of Dick's novels until her death in 2000. Felix assisted with this, and after Mary died, Felix took over her work. Felix and his father often worked together on plot and character details at Dick’s home in the Cayman Islands. This partnership allowed Dick to draw upon Felix’s knowledge and experience as a physics teacher in Twice Shy and his past as an international marksman in Shattered (2000) and Under Orders (2006).

With the publication of Dead Heat in 2007, Felix took on a more significant role in writing, and was credited as co-author. Silks (2008) was the second novel in this father-and-son collaboration, and Even Money (2009) was the third. Crossfire (2010) was the novel Dick and Felix were working on when Dick died in February 2010.

Felix's first novel written without his father was Gamble, published in September 2011, beginning the "Dick Francis novel" franchise.

== Critical response ==
Kirkus said Gamble was "fully worthy of the family name", familiar to Dick Francis fans, but well-handled. Eurocrime gave a mixed review to Gamble, commenting on Felix's lack of direct experience of horseracing, criticizing "a curious flatness" in its narration, but calling it "a nicely layered, slightly complex thriller".

== Novels ==
Title	Year	ISBN of first edition	Narrator/Main character	Notes
Gamble	2011	ISBN 978-1-4104-3870-6	Nicholas "Foxy" Foxton, financial adviser	
Bloodline	2012	ISBN 978-1-4104-5223-8	Mark Shillington, racing commentator	
Refusal	2013	ISBN 978-0-3991-6081-3	Sid Halley, former private investigator	Halley was a character created by Francis's father
Damage	2014	ISBN 978-0-3991-6822-2	Jeff Hinkley, BHA investigator	
Front Runner	2015	ISBN 978-1-4059-1522-9	Jeff Hinkley, BHA investigator	
Triple Crown	2016	ISBN 978-0-3995-7470-2	Jeff Hinkley, BHA investigator	
Pulse	2017	ISBN 978-0-3995-7474-0	Chris Rankin, doctor	Dr Rankin is the first female protagonist/narrator in any of the books
Crisis	2018	ISBN 978-0-5255-3676-5	Harrison Foster, solicitor and crisis manager	
Guilty Not Guilty	2019	ISBN 978-0-5255-3679-6	Bill Russell, actuary and racing steward	
Iced	2021	ISBN 978-1-471-19661-4	Miles Pussett, former steeplechase jockey, now tobogganist	
Hands Down	2022	ISBN 978-1-471-19666-9	Sid Halley, former private investigator	
No Reserve	2023	ISBN 978-1-804-18322-9	Theo Jennings, auctioneer	
Syndicate	2024	ISBN 978-1-804-18328-1	Chester Newton, racing syndicate organiser	
Dark Horse	2025	ISBN 979-8-892-42260-4	Sid Halley, former private investigator	
