= Savage Messiah (1972 film) =

- Theatrical poster
- Directed by: Ken Russell
- Written by: Christopher Logue
- Based on: Savage Messiah by H. S. Ede
- Produced by: Ken Russell
- Starring: Dorothy Tutin; Scott Antony; Helen Mirren
- Cinematography: Dick Bush
- Edited by: Michael Bradsell
- Music by: Michael Garrett
- Production company: Russ-Arts
- Distributed by: MGM-EMI
- Release dates: June 28, 1972 (Portugal); September 14, 1972 (United Kingdom)
- Running time: 103 minutes
- Country: United Kingdom
- Language: English
- Budget: $705,000

Savage Messiah is a 1972 British biographical drama film of the life of French sculptor Henri Gaudier-Brzeska, made by Russ-Arts and distributed by MGM. It was directed and produced by Ken Russell, with Harry Benn as associate producer, from a screenplay by Christopher Logue, based on the 1931 book Savage Messiah by H. S. Ede. Much of the content of Ede's book came from letters sent between Henri Gaudier-Brzeska and his lover Sophie Brzeska.

== Cast ==
- Dorothy Tutin as Sophie Brzeska
- Scott Antony as Henri Gaudier
- Helen Mirren as Gosh Boyle
- Lindsay Kemp as Angus Corky
- Michael Gough as M. Gaudier
- John Justin as Lionel Shaw
- Aubrey Richards as Mayor
- Peter Vaughan as Museum Attendant
- Ben Aris as Thomas Buff
- Eleanor Fazan as Madam Gaudier
- Otto Diamant as Mr. Saltzman
- Imogen Claire as Mavis
- Judith Paris as Kate

== Production ==
=== Background ===
The film was based on the biography by Jim Ede, who had discovered the story while working at the Tate Gallery. Ede had acquired Sophie Brzeska's estate in 1927 from the British Treasury Solicitor after she died intestate. This acquisition included not only her writings, but also the estate of Henri Gaudier, with many of his works and papers. Ede drew extensively on the letters written by Gaudier to Brzeska, and her writings and other material, when he published A Life of Gaudier-Brzeska (London: W. Heinemann) in 1930; the 1931 and later editions are entitled Savage Messiah.

The book was admired by Ken Russell who said "it will ever be an inspiration to anyone down on their luck with a belief in their own talent, despite the hostility of those who should know better. Here was a tale worth telling on film ... although for years it seemed to be nothing but a pipe dream."

Russell had made a number of films about artists, mostly for television, starting with Two Scottish Painters. His success with feature films such as Women in Love encouraged him to turn the book into a feature.

Russell says because the film was about an artist it was considered an "art film" and was difficult to finance. "I ended up double mortgaging my house and finding most of the money myself", he later wrote. "There was a chance I'd end up on the street but I felt I owed Gaudier something. It would have been so easy to go into my father's business and opted for the easy life but Gaudier taught me there was a life outside commerce and it was well worth fighting for."

Russell said the project "was austere and simple ... my least glamorous film. I was satiated with flamboyance." He said "I wanted to show artists as workers not people who live in ivory towers." Russell later wrote "it was about passion and sweat ... it was about revolution and fuck the art dealers."

The production designer was Derek Jarman who had worked on The Devils and who Russell called "the last true bohemian." Jarman also designed the sets. Some of the budget was provided by the Lee brothers, who also let Russell use their studio.

Russell arranged distribution through MGM, for whom he had just made The Boy Friend. "My deal with MGM is that they'll show my version for three weeks at least," he said just before the film was released. "Then they can hack it up."

The musical score was by Michael Garrett – though music by Claude Debussy, Alexander Scriabin, and Sergei Prokofiev was also used.

=== Casting ===
He gave the lead roles to Dorothy Tutin, one of Britain's top stage actresses, and Scott Antony, a newcomer from drama school. Russell said Antony "was chosen out of 300 actors I saw because he was the only one I thought could pick up a hammer and hit a stone. Being an artist is a physical thing."

== Reception ==
According to Rex Reed the film was a "tremendous hit with audiences" at the Venice Film Festival although not with critics.

The Los Angeles Times said the film was "utterly unconvincing".

Russell described the film as "just two people talking". He said it and "Song of Summer" helped get him the job of directing Altered States, because it showed he could handle actors.

== Notes ==
- Dilys Powell "The sorcerer's apprentice" (film review in The Sunday Times; 17 Sept. 1972)
- Richard Combs "Savage Messiah" (review) in: Monthly Film Bulletin; 1972, p. 217
- Russell, Ken (1991). Alternate States. Bantam Books.
