= The Mutations =

1974 film directed by Jack Cardiff

- British quad-style poster
- Directed by: Jack Cardiff
- Written by: Edward Mann; Robert D. Weinbach
- Produced by: Robert D. Weinbach
- Starring: Donald Pleasence; Tom Baker; Brad Harris; Julie Ege; Michael Dunn; Scott Antony; Jill Haworth
- Cinematography: Paul Beeson
- Edited by: John Trumper
- Music by: Basil Kirchin
- Production companies: Cyclone Productions; Getty Pictures Corp.
- Distributed by: Columbia-Warner (UK); Columbia Pictures (US)
- Release dates: 25 September 1974 (US); October 1974 (UK)
- Running time: 92 minutes
- Countries: United Kingdom; United States
- Language: English

The Mutations (also known as The Mutation, The Freaks, and The Freakmaker) is a 1974 science-fiction horror film directed by Jack Cardiff and starring Donald Pleasence, Tom Baker, Brad Harris, Julie Ege, Michael Dunn, Scott Antony and Jill Haworth. It is about a geneticist (Pleasence) performing cutting-edge but illegal experiments, and sending the resultant “freaks” to a circus sideshow.

This was the last film to be directed by Cardiff, before he returned to cinematography full-time. It was also one of the last acting roles of Michael Dunn, who died in August 1973, over a year before the film’s premiere.

== Plot ==
Professor Nolter is a deranged genetic scientist, whose self-proclaimed goal is to break through to the next stage in human evolution, cross-breeding anthropophagous Venus flytraps with abducted college student guinea pigs from his own class. He plans to "create a race of plants that can walk, and men that can take root" through an exploitation of certain nucleic acids.

The failed experimental mutants are then given to a cruel circus freak show owner, Mr. Lynch, who exploits them to the fullest. However, the mutants and the circus freaks will not be denied

== Cast ==
- Donald Pleasence as Professor Nolter
- Tom Baker as Lynch
- Brad Harris as Brian Redford
- Julie Ege as Hedi
- Michael Dunn as Burns
- Scott Antony as Tony
- Jill Haworth as Lauren
- Olga Anthony as Bridget
- Lisa Collings as prostitute
- Joan Scott as landlady
- Toby Lennon as tramp
- John Wreford as policeman
- Eithne Dunne as nurse
- Richard Davies as doctor

== Production ==
Inspired by Tod Browning's film Freaks (1932) with a science fiction twist, the film features pseudo-scientific jargon, stop motion visuals, makeup effects, references to psychedelics, comical gore, nudity, and appearances by actors with actual genetic abnormalities as well as some fictional disabilities including a man with "rubber bones" known as the Human Pretzel, a lady with reptilian skin (Alligator Lady), a Monkey Woman, a Human Pincushion and Popeye.

Among the other scenes of "freaks" it depicts a reversed stop motion capture of the professor reviving a mouldy orange, and feeding a rabbit to a Venus flytrap.

The dissonant orchestral score was composed by Basil Kirchin .

== Home media ==
The film was released on DVD by Subversive Cinema on September 27, 2005; Subversive re-released it on January 29, 2008, as a part of the Greenhouse Gore collection, including commentary by Jack Cardiff, Robert Weinbach, and Brad Harris. It was released by Desert Island Films on February 18, 2012.

== Reception ==
The Monthly Film Bulletin wrote: "Brian to Tony: 'You make it sound like bad science fiction'. Indeed. The Mutations is a loose amalgam of Frankenstein and Freaks in which vapid technical jargon and cute time-lapse photography serve as a substitute for cinematic substance. The film, which takes as its subject biological innovation and rapid structural change, has been directed in such a tired, conventional manner that its form appears to be a parody of its content. At no point does the direction ever satisfactorily blend the two stories (the mad scientist and the plight of the sideshow performers) – a weakness that effectively hampers any fascination that the mechanics of the genre might have generated. In Freaks, Browning's clinical direction impelled his audience to feel simultaneous respect and revulsion for the title characters. By comparison, the total lack of sincerity surrounding The Mutations, and Cardiff's superficial, rudimentary approach to his material, relegate the film to the level of pure exploitation."

Critic Leonard Maltin awarded the film 2 out of 4 stars, criticizing the film's predictable story and what he called "grotesque elements and characters".

TV Guide awarded the film 1/5 stars, writing: "Though at times the film is so bad it's unintentionally funny, it has a certain cruelty to it."

Michael H. Price of the Fort Worth Star-Telegram gave the movie 3 stars and praised the movie, comparing it to Freaks, and calling the effects "at once shocking and fascinating" and praising its "dissonant orchestral score" which he claims "adds mightily to the mood of unease and gathering madness."

Leslie Halliwell said: "Tasteless horror film with little style of any kind."

The Radio Times Guide to Films gave the film 2/5 stars, writing: "Veteran cinematographer-turned-director Jack Cardiff's mind-boggling mad scientist extravaganza triumphantly embraces bad taste to provide queasy frissons rarely witnessed in British horror. Demented biologist Donald Pleasence crosses humans with plants and sends his gruesome failures to Michael Dunn, a dwarf who runs a circus sideshow. His most successful hybrid is a man-sized Venus fly trap (Scott Antony) who ingests a tramp before traumatising Jill Haworth and Julie Ege. Mixing genuinely deformed performers with made-up actors, the discomfiting template may be that of Freaks, but its prurient atmosphere is rooted in 1970s British sleaze."
