= Percy Francis (footballer) =

English footballer

Personal information
- Full name: Percy Ollivant Francis
- Date of birth: 9 January 1875
- Place of birth: Derby, England
- Date of death: 1947 (aged 71–72)
- Position: Inside forward

Senior career*
Years	Team	Apps	(Gls)
1893–1896	Derby County	16	(6)
- * Club domestic league appearances and goals

Percy Ollivant Francis (9 January 1875–1947) was an English footballer who played in the Football League for Derby County.
