= Under Orders =

First edition (publ. Michael Joseph)

Under Orders is a novel by Dick Francis, published on 7 September 2006.

This is the fourth Francis novel to feature Sid Halley, jockey turned private detective.

The title is a reference to the time shortly before the start of the race, when the horses and jockeys must obey the orders of the starter.

Francis' well-known collaboration with his wife Mary resulted in the pair producing one book every year until 2000, when Mary died. Under Orders was the first book he wrote after her death, appearing after a six-year gap. Although the book lists Dick Francis as sole author, it appears that his son Felix provided major assistance in the writing, as evidenced by a substantial change in style that is characteristic of all the later books credited to Dick and Felix Francis as co-authors, as well as books written solely by Felix after his father's death.
