= Dead Cert (1974 film) =

1974 British crime film by Tony Richardson

- Film Poster
- Directed by: Tony Richardson
- Written by: John Oaksey; Tony Richardson
- Based on: Dead Cert by Dick Francis
- Produced by: Neil Hartley
- Starring: Scott Antony; Judi Dench; Michael Williams
- Cinematography: Freddie Cooper
- Edited by: John Glen
- Music by: John Addison
- Production company: Woodfall Film Productions
- Distributed by: United Artists
- Release date: May 1974
- Running time: 99 minutes
- Country: United Kingdom
- Language: English

Dead Cert is a 1974 British crime thriller film directed by Tony Richardson and starring Scott Antony, Judi Dench and Michael Williams. It was written by ex-jockey and Daily Telegraph racing correspondent Lord John Oaksey and Richardson, adapted from the 1962 novel of the same name by Dick Francis. Oaksey was also technical advisor and a riding double in the film.

== Plot ==
Alan York is stunned when his dear friend, skilled jockey Bill Davidson, is killed during a simple steeplechase. Convinced Davidson's death was no accident, York begins an investigation with a suspicion that Davidson's racehorse, Admiral, was drugged in a murderous act of sabotage. Assisting him as he delves into this world of high stakes, horses and gambling is Davidson's devoted widow, Laura.

== Cast ==
- Scott Antony as Alan York
- Judi Dench as Laura Davidson
- Michael Williams as Sandy Mason
- Nina Thomas as Penny Brocker
- Julian Glover as Lodge
- Mark Dignam as Clifford Tudor
- John Bindon as Walter
- Joseph Blatchley as Joe Nantwich
- Ian Hogg as Bill Davidson
- Sean Lynch as Sid
- Hideo Saito as Yuko
  - Burt Kwouk as Yuko (voice)
- Geoffrey Bateman as Everest
- Mickey Dillon as Jockey
- Bill Fraser as Uncle George
- Frank Gentry as Gipsy
- Willoughby Gray as Coroner
- Nigel Humphreys as Sergeant
- Llewellyn Rees as Chemist
- Dervis Ward as Albert
- Annie Ross as Mrs. Mervyn (uncredited)

The horse Admiral was played by the three-day eventing champion Cornishman V, the same horse that played Arizona Pie in International Velvet.

== Production ==
Some scenes were shot at Fontwell and Aintree.

== Release ==
The film was premiered on 9 May 1974 at the London Pavilion, with guest of honour Princess Anne and Captain Mark Phillips. The film ran for three weeks in London before going on general release. An adaptation of the novel by Dick Francis, it is the only Francis novel to date released theatrically.

== Reception ==
=== Box office ===
Its gross in the first 6 days at the Pavilion was $5,349.

=== Critical ===
The Monthly Film Bulletin wrote: "Dead Cert is rather revealing, as evidence of how a director experienced in other fields can take a toss on the deceptively simple terrain of a straightforward thriller. What it needs is basically what Dick Francis' heavily adapted original provided: robust action, a rising curve of suspense and a professional background accurate and interesting enough to ease the plot over its implausibilities. But Tony Richardson's film is all stop-start, never building real momentum, or even much sense of urgency around the doings of its oddly boorish, woman-encumbered hero as he prowls about a kind of Soho-on-Sea – strip clubs as a change of scene from stables. The picture also gets itself into quite a plot tangle about just what its villains are supposed to be doing ...The unit went to some trouble to stage their own Grand National, with a field of chasing veterans, and a camera at one point strapped to a jockey's chest; a pity that the cut-in close shots and choppy editing spoil the effect."

In The Radio Times Guide to Films David Parkinson gave the film 2/5 stars, writing: "The authentic atmosphere of stableyards and racecourses that characterises Francis's thrillers has been missed by a lot more than a short head here."

Dick Francis later told Clive Hirschhorn of the Sunday Express that the film had been "an utter disaster. I blame the director, Tony Richardson, for its failure. He chopped and changed it about so badly it was virtually unrecognisable. This was particularly embarrassing because Princess Anne sat next to me at the premiere. It was the first time I'd seen a completed version of the film and I was appalled. I'm sure the princess hated it, but, of course, she was very gracious."
