= Mike Gwilym =

Welsh actor

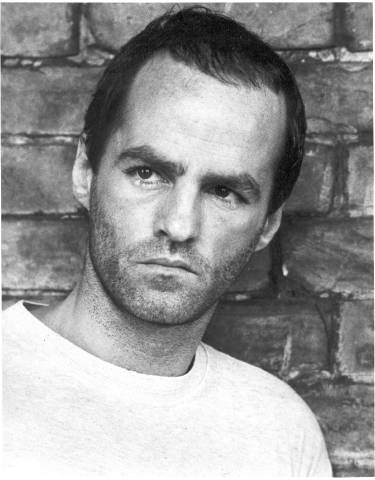
- Born: Michael Gwilym; 5 March 1949 (age 77); Neath, Wales
- Occupation: Actor
- Years active: 1969–1990
- Spouse: E. M. Coutinho
- Website: www.sotogrande.us

Mike Gwilym (born 5 March 1949) is a Welsh actor.

== Early life ==
Born in Neath, Gwilym is the brother of actor Robert Gwilym, son of Arthur Aubrey Remington Gwilym and Renée Mathilde Eugénie Léonce Dupont. His parents were the proprietors of a women's clothing chain in Wales and his maternal grandfather was the Belgian oil industrialist Edmond Jules Dupont from Liège. Mike Gwilym's interest in acting began while at Wycliffe Preparatory School, but he began his acting career while at university at Oxford with the Oxford University Dramatic Society, and went on to join the Glasgow Citizens' Theatre before becoming an associate actor of the Royal Shakespeare Company.

== Career ==
His stage debut was as 'Prince Hal' in Henry IV, Part 1 at the Playhouse Theatre, Sheffield, UK in 1969.

Gwilym joined the Royal Shakespeare Company in 1974; his debut in London was with that company in that year as 'Vlass' in Summerfolk, at the Aldwych Theatre. He starred in many of their productions during the late 1970s and early 1980s, including The Comedy of Errors, King Lear, Troilus and Cressida, and Love's Labour's Lost. He made his television debut in the BBC's 1975 adaptation of How Green Was My Valley.

His most high-profile role was as jockey-turned-detective Sid Halley in The Racing Game, a six-part Yorkshire Television series based on Dick Francis's 1965 novel Odds Against, and his film credits include roles in Hopscotch (1980), Venom (1981), Priest of Love (1981), A.D. (1985), and Peter the Great (1986). He subsequently returned to playing classical roles on stage and screen. In the BBC Television Shakespeare series, he starred in Coriolanus (as Aufidius), in Love's Labour's Lost (as Berowne), and Pericles, Prince of Tyre in the title role.

Gwilym retired from the professional stage to the South of Spain (province of Malaga), where his parents had a summer home. From the year 2001 he has shared a home with his partner in Sotogrande in the province of Cadiz.
