= Mary Margaret Francis =

British author, wife of Dick Francis

- Born: Mary Margaret Brenchley; 17 June 1924 England
- Died: 30 September 2000 (aged 76) Seven Mile Beach, Grand Cayman
- Spouse: Dick Francis
- Children: 2, including Felix Francis

Mary Margaret Francis (17 June 1924 – 30 September 2000) was a British author who has been credited with an extensive role helping her husband, crime writer Dick Francis, write his novels. She also was a small-business entrepreneur who operated a dress shop and an air taxi service.

== Biography ==
Mary Margaret Brenchley was born on 17 June 1924, in England, to a printing company director. She attended Milton Mount College then Royal Holloway, University of London, studying French and English. While at university, she published two short stories. After working as a publisher's reader, an English teacher and assistant stage manager at the Hereford Theatre, she met the jockey Dick Francis at a 1945 wedding, and married him in 1947, making her wedding dress out of cheesecloth. In 1949, Mary Francis had their first child. Their second child is Felix Francis. She also operated a dress shop.

She helped her husband write many of his books and was credited with an extensive contribution to them by Dick Francis, though the extent of her contribution has been debated. Graham Lord argued in an unauthorized biography that she was a major contributor for his books and served as a ghostwriter. Francis told Lord that, "Dick would like me to have all the credit for them".

While her husband was working on Flying Finish, she started an air taxi service, wrote a manual "Flying Start: A Guide to Flying Light Aircraft" and learnt to fly. She edited and took several photographs that were used on the dust jacket of her husband's novels. Dick Francis told Jean Swanson and Dean James in an interview:

Mary and I worked as a team. ... I have often said that I would have been happy to have both our names on the cover. Mary's family always called me Richard due to having another Dick in the family. I am Richard, Mary was Mary, and Dick Francis was the two of us together.

The couple spent their later years in Florida and the Cayman Islands. She died on 30 September 2000 in an apartment in George Town. A memorial service for her was held on 29 November at the Queen's Chapel of the Savoy, in which Queen Elizabeth The Queen Mother was represented by Alastair Aird. John Major was also present.
