= Mark Francis =

Mark Francis may refer to:

- Mark Francis (English footballer) (born 1994), English footballer
- Mark Francis (soccer) (born 1960), English-American soccer midfielder
- Mark Francis (artist) (born 1962), Irish painter
- Mark-Francis Vandelli (born 1988), British television personality

== See also ==
- Mark Lewis-Francis (born 1982), British athlete
- Mark Francois (born 1965), English politician
