= Kevin Francis =

Kevin Francis may refer to:

- Kevin Francis (film producer), English film executive
- Kevin Francis (footballer, born 1967), retired English-born St Kitts and Nevis international centre-forward
- Kevin Francis (Canadian football) (born 1993), Canadian football linebacker
