= Dead Cert (novel) =

1962 novel

- First edition cover
- Author: Dick Francis
- Cover artist: Trevor Denning
- Language: English
- Genre: Mystery
- Publisher: Michael Joseph Ltd
- Publication date: 1962
- Publication place: United Kingdom
- ISBN: 0-330-24621-6
- OCLC: 35135934

Dead Cert is Dick Francis's first novel, published in 1962 by Michael Joseph Ltd in the UK and in the US by Holt, Rinehart and Winston.

The title is a shortened form of the informal UK expression "It's a dead certainty", meaning something that is sure to happen or succeed, and in this case is a play on words in reference to the plot.

== Plot ==
Admiral should have won his race at Maidenhead, but an unexpected fall and the accidental death of top jockey Bill Davidson gave his friend, Alan York, the win instead. But Alan recognised a trip wire when he saw one and was not about to let a murderous act go unpunished. The trouble was that he left drawing it to the attention of the authorities too late and the evidence had disappeared. Only the efficient Police Inspector Lodge is prepared to believe that it was a deliberate killing - and at first is inclined to suspect Alan's involvement.

Alan is persuaded to ride a novice hunter in another race and is surprised to find it belongs to the glamorous Kate Ellery-Penn, whose Uncle George has given her the horse as a birthday present. Alan is attracted to her from the start, but unfortunately so is another of his jockey friends, Dane.

As he leaves the course, Alan comes across two gangs of taxi drivers, from London and Brighton, brutally fighting it out with knives and knuckle-dusters. Not long afterwards he recognises some of them when he is roughed up as a warning not to pursue his enquiries, but this only spurs him on to investigate what is obviously an organised attempt to interfere with horse racing on a wider scale than he had first thought. Some of his jockey colleagues have already come under suspicion for deliberately slowing down their mounts: the popular and experienced Sandy Mason, for example, and the cocky but easily panicked youngster, Joe Nantwich.

From now on Alan sets out on a double pursuit, of the gang responsible for the death of his friend, and of Kate. The latter lives in a stately house in Sussex with her upper-crust Uncle and her Aunt Deb, who does her best to discourage Alan from taking his interest in Kate further when he pays a weekend stay. While there he visits Brighton with Kate and comes across an ex-military pub landlord who has organised his fellow owners of small businesses in resisting a protection racket. Taxi drivers from one of the local firms were involved with this and Alan traces some of those he recognises from his earlier run-in with them to Marconicars.

Before he can take things much further, Alan's own horse is tripped during a race. As he lies on the ground helpless, one of those who had helped rig the wire comes over and kicks him unconscious. When he comes round in hospital, he is concussed and there are gaps in his memory. Back at Bill Davidson's house, where he continues to live for the time being, he discovers that one of Bill's young sons routinely listens to incoming phone calls. From him he learns that Bill had received a phone instruction to pull the race in which he died. Having had such a call too, Alan had forewarned Inspector Lodge of what might happen and is visited by him as he recovers. Suspicion seems to point to a bookmaker who has an office above Marconicars and to one of their principal customers.

Joe Nantwich has discovered a clue to who might be rigging the races but before he can hand it over to Alan, he is stabbed to death at the West Sussex races. Next the killers come after Alan, posing as police officers, but he manages to escape them on Admiral (which he has inherited from Bill) and jumps over the wayside hedges into the fields and then a fir plantation, with the fake officers and the Marconicars fleet combing all the nearby roads.

Overcoming one of their drivers, Alan heads for the main office and finds Uncle George at the radio microphone, furiously insisting that Alan be killed. Rather than be arrested, Uncle George shoots himself and consequently Kate rejects Alan, only relenting later and agreeing to marry him. When Alan's memory returns fully, he realises it was Sandy Mason who had been passing on information about his enquiries to the gang and had kicked him after his fall. With Dane's magnanimous help, Alan gets his revenge by unseating Sandy from his horse mid-race.

== Critical reception ==
The Guardian's obituary of Francis read, "Right from the start, with Dead Cert in 1962, the Dick Francis thriller showed a mastery of lean, witty genre prose reminiscent—sometimes to the point of comic parody—of Raymond Chandler and Dashiell Hammett. It was an American style that many clever people in England had attempted to reproduce without much success, and it was a wonder how a barely educated former jump jockey was able to do the trick with such effortless ease."

Fred Glueckstein, in Of Men, Women and Horses (2006), wrote that "During the course of York's adventures, one can identify in Francis's work the elements that would precede his future success: a lone hero fighting villains with honor, courage, and determination; skilled plotting; action and suspense, and classic scenes of equestrian fiction."

The New York Times added some background in its obituary of Francis,

A chance encounter with a literary agent led to his writing The Sport of Queens, published the year after he retired. Emboldened by its success (and further motivated by his paltry wages as a journalist), he began writing Dead Cert. Drawing on his experiences as a jockey and his intimate knowledge of the racetrack crowd—from aristocratic owners to Cockney stable boys—the novel contained all the elements that readers would come to relish from a Dick Francis thriller. There was the pounding excitement of a race, the aura of the gentry at play, the sweaty smells from the stables out back, an appreciation for the regal beauty and unique personality of a thoroughbred—and enough sadistic violence to man and beast to satisfy the bloodthirsty.

Dead Cert is included in the "fiction core list" in Carol Alabaster's book Developing an Outstanding Core Collection: A Guide for Libraries (2002). It is also featured in 100 Must-Read Crime Novels. As well as praise for the author, the review also points out his weak points. "His characterization, particularly of women, is a bit perfunctory and his plots are often creaky. What he does offer in all his novels are a real insider’s view of the racing business and a genuine ability to ratchet up the tension."

== Adaptations ==
Two films have been based on the novel: Tony Richardson's poorly reviewed crime thriller of 1974 and Russian TV's two-part The Favorite, aired in 1977.
