= David J. Francis (academic) =

American psychologist

David J. Francis is an American psychologist, focusing in statistical models for longitudinal data, multi-level models, latent variable models, psychometrics, reading acquisition and the early identification and prevention of reading disabilities and developmental disabilities, currently the Hugh Roy and Hugh Roy and Lillie Cranz Cullen Distinguished University Chair at University of Houston.
