= William T. Francis =

American politician (1870–1929)

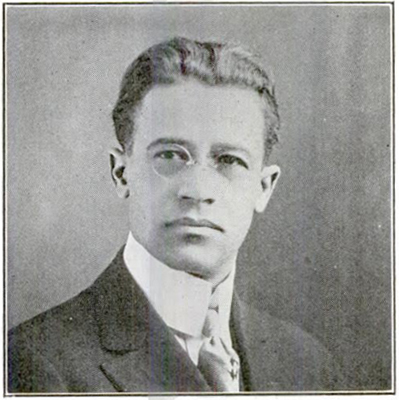
- William T. Francis, ca 1904
- Born: March 26, 1870; Indianapolis, Indiana, U.S.
- Died: 15 July 1929 (aged 59); Monrovia, Liberia
- Occupations: Lawyer, Politician, Diplomat
- Known for: U.S. Minister/Consul General to Liberia
- Political party: Republican

William T. Francis (March 26, 1870 – July 15, 1929) was an American lawyer, politician, and diplomat from Minnesota. He was a successful personal and civil rights lawyer, winning discrimination cases against the police and employers, and successfully lobbying for state anti-discrimination and anti-lynching legislation. He was the U.S. Minister Resident/Consul General in Liberia, the first African-American diplomat from Minnesota. In Liberia, Francis conducted a nine-month inquiry into allegations of government involvement in slavery and forced labor. He died in post in Liberia of yellow fever. His report helped achieve a League of Nations investigation that ultimately forced the president, Charles D.B. King, and the vice president of Liberia, Allen Yancy, to resign in 1930.

== Early life, education, and career ==
Francis was born in Indianapolis, Indiana, on March 26, 1870 (or April 26, 1869), moving to St. Paul, Minnesota in 1887, without having recognized scholastic qualifications. His middle name is variously reported as Treyanne, Trevane, and Trevanne. He was employed by the Northern Pacific Railway, first as a messenger, then stenographer, and then clerk in the legal department, becoming temporary chief clerk in 1901. He enrolled at William Mitchell College of Law (then the St. Paul College of Law), earning his degree in 1904.

Francis was appointed chief clerk of the Northern Pacific's legal department, becoming one of the highest-ranking African-American employees of any business in Minnesota, practicing law privately as well. He left Northern Pacific to take over the solo law firm of his friend and mentor, Frederick McGhee, after his 1912 death. He had a busy law practice, covering civil and criminal cases, as well as some involving racial discrimination and civil rights. In 1914, he gained George T. Williams, a Pullman porter, a record $3,000 judgment for malicious prosecution by his employer, but it was overturned on appeal. In 1919, he pursued a successful habeas corpus action, challenging the police practice of holding black women in custody without charge, and challenged others for refusing services on the grounds of race. He is reported to have said that while black lawyers could gain some white clients at that time, racial barriers prevented them from reaching their full potential.

== Political and diplomatic career ==
"The solution of the whole problem … is simple justice; a recognition of the fact that the rights of the humblest citizen are as worthy of protection as those of the highest."

— William T. Francis

Francis was a Republican, taking moderate positions on race in public. He was an admirer of Booker T. Washington, supporting and participating in civil rights organizations like the National Afro-American Council. In 1906, Francis ran for St. Paul city assembly and lost, but received a respectable 9,000 votes. Francis also lost a bid for U.S. Minister to Haiti in 1911, as well as a run for the state assembly in 1912. In 1915, he lobbied the city council to ban the film The Birth of a Nation because of its racist content.

The NAACP reported that Francis was nominated over a white opponent in the 1916 Republican primary for the 38th district in Saint Paul. He does not appear, however, to have won office.

In 1919, Francis gave a speech on Reconstruction and race relations, encouraging the audience to, despite the unfairness, "make up your mind to improve your condition and do it". In 1920, he was appointed to the Minnesota Republican Central Committee, serving as a president elector at the Republican State Convention. Around then, his wife helped earn women the right to vote, and wrote the state anti-lynching bill after a particularly brutal lynching episode in Duluth in June 1920. Francis supported his wife in getting the bill passed in the Minnesota legislature in 1921, but the principal credit is hers. There was still no federal anti-lynching law at that time. William Francis also successfully lobbied through a bill against racial discrimination in hairdressing schools.

On July 9, 1927, he was appointed U.S. Minister Resident/Consul General to Liberia by President Calvin Coolidge. He died in post in Liberia two years later. In 1928, he had been assigned by the Secretary of State, Henry Stimson, to investigate rumors of government involvement in slavery and forced labor. Francis ran a nine-month inquiry, establishing that government officials including the president, Charles D.B. King, had profited from forced removal of young men from Liberia into forced labor on Spanish plantations on Bioko Island. After Francis' death, his report helped ensure a League of Nations investigation, which led to the resignation of the president and vice president of Liberia.

== Personal life ==
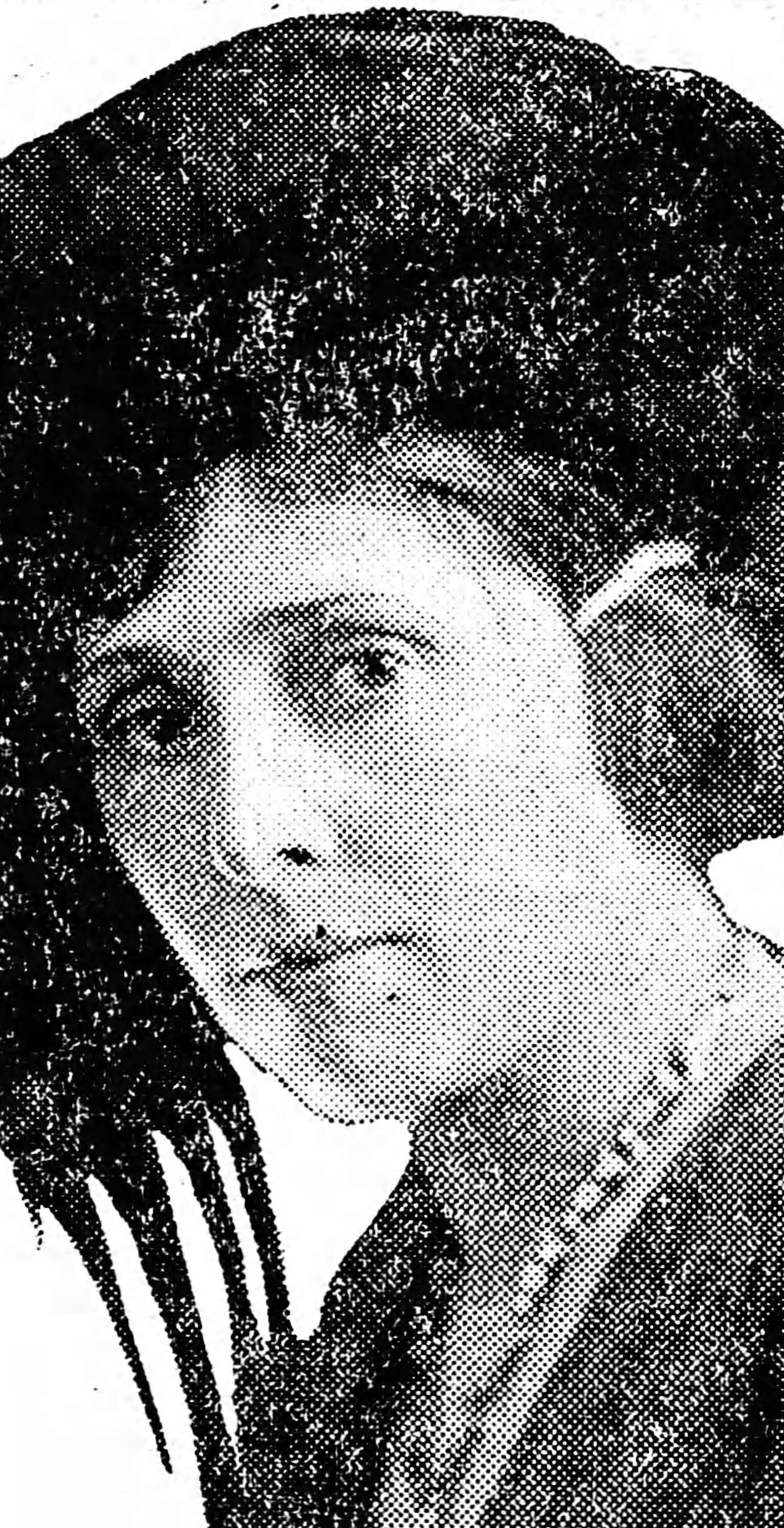
Nellie Griswold Francis

Francis married Nellie Griswold Francis on August 14, 1893, a leading African-American suffragist and civic activist, originally from Nashville, Tennessee. They are reported to have had a particularly happy marriage, with 25th anniversary celebrations reported in the news. His wife's sister and brother-in-law lived with them.

Francis was a member of Pilgrim Baptist Church, where both he and his wife were singers. Francis also acted in plays and musicals. Francis was a member of Alpha Phi Alpha fraternity.

In 1924, the couple bought a two-story house on Sargent Avenue in the Groveland Park neighborhood of St. Paul, and faced vicious and threatening opposition from some white residents. The local improvement association first offered to buy the house, then began marching out front with burning flares, sending threatening letters and making threatening phone calls. Two crosses were burned on their lawn, said to be the Ku Klux Klan's final warning. The Francises remained in the house until they moved to Liberia.

Francis died after a month of suffering, on July 15, 1929, in Liberia. Previously thought to have malaria, he was diagnosed with yellow fever. A despatch from the legation stated that "The intense pain and suffering of the Minister can hardly be described". Nellie Francis returned to Tennessee and died in 1969. They are buried in Greenwood Cemetery in Nashville, William Francis having first had a funeral at the Pilgrim Baptist Church in St. Paul on August 11, 1929. There was another funeral service in Nashville and a Masonic burial.

Government offices
Preceded by Solomon Porter Hood	United States Minister to Liberia; July 9, 1927 – July 15, 1929	Succeeded by Charles E. Mitchell
