= Dick Francis =

English jockey and crime writer (1920–2010)

Dick Francis CBE
- Dick Francis
- Born: 31 October 1920; Lawrenny, Pembrokeshire, Wales
- Died: 14 February 2010 (aged 89); Grand Cayman, Cayman Islands
- Citizenship: United Kingdom
- Occupations: Jockey; Novelist
- Spouse: Mary Margaret Francis (m. 1947; died 2000)
- Children: 2, including Felix
- Writing career
- Language: English
- Period: 1957–2010
- Genre: Crime fiction
- Notable awards: Edgar Award; Gold Dagger
- Website: www.dickfrancis.com

Richard Stanley Francis (31 October 1920 – 14 February 2010) was a British steeplechase jockey and crime writer whose novels centre on horse racing in England.

After wartime service in the RAF, Francis became a full-time jump-jockey, winning over 350 races and becoming champion jockey of the British National Hunt. He came to further prominence in 1956 as jockey to Queen Elizabeth The Queen Mother, riding her horse Devon Loch which fell when close to winning the Grand National. Francis retired from horseracing and became a journalist and novelist.

Many of his novels deal with crime in the horse-racing world, with some of the criminals being outwardly respectable figures. The stories are narrated by the main character, often a jockey, but sometimes a trainer, an owner, a bookmaker or someone in a different profession, peripherally linked to racing. This person always faces great obstacles, often including physical injury. More than forty of these novels became international best-sellers.

== Personal life ==
Francis was born in Coedcanlas, Pembrokeshire, Wales. Some sources report his birthplace as the inland town of Lawrenny, but at least two of his obituaries stated his birthplace as the coastal town of Tenby. His autobiography says that he was born at his maternal grandparents' farm at Coedcanlas on the estuary of the River Cleddau, roughly a mile north-west of Lawrenny. His mother had likely returned to her parents' home to give birth, as was the custom. He was the son of a jockey and stable manager and his wife. Francis grew up in Maidenhead in Berkshire, England. He left school at 15 without any qualifications, intending to become a jockey; by the time he was 18, in 1938, he also was training horses.

In October 1945, he met Mary Margaret Brenchley (17 June 1924 – 30 September 2000) at a cousin's wedding. In most interviews, they commented that it was love at first sight. Their families were not entirely happy with their engagement, but the couple married in June 1947 in London. She had graduated with a degree in English and French from London University at the age of 19, was an assistant stage manager and later worked as a publisher's reader. She also became a pilot and her experience of flying contributed to many novels, including Flying Finish, Rat Race, and Second Wind. She contracted polio while pregnant with their first child. They had two sons, one of whom was Felix Francis (born 1953).

For nearly 30 years, Francis lived in Blewbury in Berkshire (now in Oxfordshire). In the 1980s, he and his wife moved to Florida in the United States. In 1992, they moved to the Cayman Islands, where Mary died of a heart attack in 2000. In 2006, Francis had a heart bypass operation; in 2007 his right foot was amputated. He died of natural causes on 14 February 2010, at his Caribbean home in Grand Cayman.

== Second World War ==
During the Second World War, Francis volunteered, hoping to join the cavalry. Instead, he served in the Royal Air Force, initially as a member of ground crew and later piloting fighter and bomber aircraft, including the Spitfire and Hurricane fighters, and the Wellington and Lancaster bombers. He received an emergency commission as a pilot officer on 29 July 1944, and was promoted war-substantive flying officer on 29 January 1945. Much of his six-year service career was spent in Africa.

== Horse racing career ==
After leaving the RAF in 1946, Francis became a highly successful jockey, reaching celebrity status in the world of British National Hunt racing. He won over 350 races, becoming champion jockey in the 1953–54 season.

Shortly after becoming a professional, he was offered the prestige job of first jockey to Vivian Smith, Lord Bicester.

From 1953 to 1957, Francis was jockey to Queen Elizabeth the Queen Mother. His best remembered moment as a jockey came while riding the Queen Mother's horse, Devon Loch, in the 1956 Grand National, when the horse inexplicably fell when close to winning the race. Decades later, Francis considered losing that race his greatest regret and called it "a disaster of massive proportions".

Francis suffered racing injuries, being first hospitalized from riding at the age of 12 when a pony fell on him and broke his jaw and nose. He drew from this career resulting in broken bones and damaged organs for his novels, in which his characters suffer the same. In 1957, after Francis suffered another serious fall, the Queen Mother's adviser, Lord Abergavenny, advised him that she wanted him to retire from racing for her.

=== Contributions to racing ===
In 1983, the Grand National at Aintree Racecourse in England "stood at the brink of extinction," according to The Philadelphia Inquirer. News reporter Don Clippinger wrote, "Britain's Jockey Club negotiated a $14 million deal to buy the land and save the race forever. The only problem was that the Jockey Club did not have $14 million, so two prominent racing personalities—Lord Derby and novelist Dick Francis—were selected to raise the money in a worldwide campaign". Other philanthropists, including Charles C. Fenwick Jr., who rode Ben Nevis to victory in the 1980 Grand National, and Paul Mellon, an American breeder and racing enthusiast, also contributed to saving the race.

== Writing career ==
Francis wrote more than 40 international best-sellers. His first book was his autobiography The Sport of Queens (1957); he was offered the aid of a ghostwriter but rejected the idea. The book's success led to his becoming the racing correspondent for London's Sunday Express newspaper, and he continued in that job for 16 years.

He set his first thriller, Dead Cert, published in 1962, in the world of horse racing, establishing a specialized niche for his work. Subsequently, he regularly produced a novel a year for the next 38 years, missing only 1998 (during which he published a short-story collection). Although all his books were set against a similar background, his male protagonists held a variety of jobs, including artist (In the Frame and To the Hilt), investigator for the Jockey Club (Slay-Ride and The Edge), pilot (Rat Race and Flying Finish), film director (Wild Horses) and wine merchant (Proof). All the novels are narrated by the hero, who in the course of the story learns that he is more resourceful, brave, tricky, than he had thought, and usually finds a certain salvation for himself as well as bestowing it on others. Details of other people's occupations fascinated Francis, and he explores the workings of such fields as photography, accountancy, the gemstone trade, and restaurant service on transcontinental trains—but always in the interest of the plot. Dysfunctional families were a subject which he also exploited (Reflex, a baleful grandmother; Hot Money, a multi-millionaire father and serial ex-husband; Decider, the related co-owners of a racecourse).

Francis rarely re-used his lead characters. Only two heroes were used more than once; injured ex-jockey turned one-handed private investigator Sid Halley (Odds Against, Whip Hand, Come to Grief, Under Orders, also in Refusal by Felix Francis after his father's death) and Kit Fielding (Break In and Bolt).

According to a columnist for the Houston Chronicle, Francis "writes believable fairy tales for adults—ones in which the actors are better than we are but are believable enough to make us wonder if indeed we could not one day manage to emulate them."

=== Writing routine ===
Francis described a typical year of research and writing to an interviewer in 1989:

In January, he sits down to write, staring down the barrel of a deadline. "My publisher comes over in mid-May to collect the manuscript," he says, "and it's got to be done."
The book's publication takes place in England in September. American publication in past years has been in February, although his next book, Straight, is set to be published in November. Once the manuscript is out of his hands, he takes the summer off, while percolating the plot of his next book. Research on the next book begins in late summer and continues through the autumn, while he's gearing up for his promotional tour for the just-published book. Come January, he sits down to write again.
He doesn't like book tours. He is not one for revelations, major life changes, and intimacies with strange interviewers, and he says he gets tired of answering the same questions again and again.
He shuns the lecture circuit. He'd prefer to let his novels and his sales volume speak for themselves... And though he doesn't love the act of writing [and] could easily retire, he finds himself planning his new book as each summer ends.
He says, "Each one, you think to yourself, 'This is the last one,' but then, by September, you're starting again. If you've got money, and you're just having fun, people think you're a useless character."
Or, as independently wealthy Tor Kelsey says in The Edge, explaining why he works for a minuscule salary: "I work... because I like it, I'm not all that bad at what I do, really, and it's useful, and I'm not terribly good at twiddling my thumbs."

=== Collaboration ===
Francis collaborated extensively in his fiction with his wife, Mary Margaret Francis, until her death. Learning this was a surprise to some readers and reviewers. He credited her with being a great researcher for the novels. In 1981, Don Clippinger interviewed the Francises for The Philadelphia Inquirer and wrote,

"When Dick Francis sits down each January to begin writing another of his popular mystery-adventure novels, it is almost a certain bet that his wife, Mary, has developed a new avocation... For instance, in Rat Race, [the protagonist] operated an air-taxi service that specialized in carrying jockeys, trainers and owners to distant race courses. Before that book came out in 1970, Mrs. Francis obtained a pilot's license and was operating an air-taxi service of her own. Francis' newest novel, Reflex, is built around photography, and sure enough, Mary Francis has become accomplished behind the camera and in the darkroom... And, in their condominium, they have set up the subject of his 20th novel [Twice Shy] – a computer. While he is touring the country, she is working on new computer programs."

According to journalist Mary Amoroso, "Mary does much of the research: She went so far as to learn to fly a plane for Flying Finish. She also edits his manuscripts and serves as a sounding board for plot line and character development. Says Francis, 'At least the research keeps her from going out shopping.'" Francis told interviewers Jean Swanson and Dean James,

Mary and I worked as a team. ... I have often said that I would have been happy to have both our names on the cover. Mary's family always called me Richard due to having another Dick in the family. I am Richard, Mary was Mary, and Dick Francis was the two of us together.

Francis' older son, Merrick, was a racehorse trainer and later ran his own horse transport business, which inspired the novel Driving Force.

Francis's manager (and co-author of his later books) was his son Felix, who left his post as teacher of A-Level Physics at Bloxham School in Oxfordshire in order to work for his father. Felix was the inspiration behind a leading character, a marksman and physics teacher, in the novel Twice Shy. Father and son collaborated on four novels. Since his father's death, Felix has carried on to publish novels with his father's name in the title, including a return for Sid Halley (Dick Francis's Refusal, 2013).

=== Honours ===
Francis is the only three-time recipient of the Mystery Writers of America's Edgar Award for Best Novel, winning for Forfeit in 1970, Whip Hand in 1981, and Come To Grief in 1996. Britain's Crime Writers' Association awarded him its Gold Dagger Award for fiction in 1979 and the Cartier Diamond Dagger Lifetime Achievement Award in 1989. He was granted another Lifetime Achievement Award. Tufts University awarded him an honorary doctorate in 1991.

In 1996 he was given the Mystery Writers of America's Grand Master Award, the highest honour bestowed by the MWA. In 2000, he was granted the Malice Domestic Award for Lifetime Achievement. He was created an Officer of the Order of the British Empire (OBE) in 1983 and promoted to Commander of the Order of the British Empire (CBE) in 2000. He was inducted into the prestigious Detection Club in 1966.

Amoroso wrote in 1989, "And yet he has a keen sense of the evanescence of literary endeavors. 'Whole months of work can be gone in four hours,' he says ruefully. 'People say they can't put my books down, and so they read them in one sitting of four hours.' Francis has been long accustomed to celebrity as a British sports star, but today he is a worldwide phenomenon, having been published in 22 languages. In Australia, he is recognized in restaurants, from his book-jacket picture. He and Mary will see people reading the novels on planes and trains."

Francis was elected in 1999 a Fellow of the Royal Society of Literature.

== Adaptations ==
=== Film and television ===
His first novel, Dead Cert, was adapted as a film under the same title in 1974. Directed by Tony Richardson, it starred Scott Antony, Judi Dench and Michael Williams. It was adapted again as Favorit (a Soviet made-for-television movie) in 1976.

Francis's protagonist Sid Halley was featured in six TV movies made for Yorkshire Television's The Dick Francis Thriller: The Racing Game (1979–1980), starring Mike Gwilym as Halley and Mick Ford as his partner, Chico Barnes. The first of the episodes, Odds Against, used a Francis title; the others were created for the programme.

Three TV films of 1989 made by RTÉ Television and Comedia Entertainment Inc (of Canada) were adaptations of Bloodsport, In the Frame, and Twice Shy, all starring Ian McShane as protagonist David Cleveland, a character used only once by Francis, in the novel Slay-Ride.

In April 2022, Kudos were announced to have optioned the TV rights for the works of Dick and Felix Francis. The series is tentatively titled The Turf, and will draw plots and characters from across the entirety of Francis' works.

=== BBC Radio ===
- Blood Sport, with John Carson, Nigel Lambert and Cherie Lunghi . Saturday Night Theatre, 31 May 1975
- Bolt, with Eric Allan as Kit Fielding and Siân Phillips as Princess Casilia. Five episodes. First broadcast March 1994
- Bonecrack, with Francis Matthews as Neil Griffon and Caroline Blakiston as Maggie Lake. Saturday Night Theatre, 28 February 1976
- Breaking Point (adaptation of the novel Nerve), with Michael Kitchen as Rob Finn. Produced by John Fawcett Wilson. Six episodes. First broadcast June 1974
- Enquiry, with Tony Osoba, Robert Lang and Bill Nighy, Afternoon Theatre, 19 October 1979
- Proof, with Nigel Havers as Tony Beach. Eight episodes. First broadcast February 1997
- Rat Race, with Hywel Bennett as Matt Shore and Helena Breck as Nancy. Four episodes. First broadcast August 1991
- Whip Hand, with Mick Ford as Sid Halley and Kim Durham as Chico Barnes, and Alan Devereux, David Vann, Patricia Gallimore and Terry Molloy. Five episodes. First broadcast November 1991

=== Video Games ===
- High Stakes was adapted into a text adventure game by Mindscape for MS-DOS and Apple II.
- Twice Shy was adapted into an illustrated text adventure by Mosaic Publishing in 1986 for the ZX Spectrum and Amstrad CPC.

== Bibliography ==
Title	Year	ISBN of first edition	Narrator/Main character	Notes
The Sport of Queens	1957			autobiography
Dead Cert	1962		Alan York, amateur jockey	Basis of the movie Dead Cert (1974)
Nerve	1964		Rob Finn, jockey	Basis of the audio drama Breaking Point (1974) starring Michael Kitchen
For Kicks	1965		Daniel Roke, Australian horse breeder temporarily turned UK investigator	
Odds Against	1965	ISBN 0-330-10597-3	Sid Halley, private investigator	Edgar Award nominee First Sid Halley novel
Flying Finish	1966		Henry Grey, groom/heir to earldom, pilot	Edgar Award nominee
Blood Sport	1967		Gene Hawkins, government security agent	Edgar Award nominee BBC Radio adaptation, 1975; TV film, 1989
Forfeit	1968	ISBN 0-425-20191-0	James Tyrone, reporter	Edgar Award winner
Enquiry	1969		Kelly Hughes, jockey	BBC Radio adaptation, 1979
Rat Race	1970		Matt Shore, former airline pilot now flying charter	BBC Radio adaptation, 1991
Bonecrack	1971	ISBN 0-718-10898-1	Neil Griffon, formerly antique dealer, then business consultant, acting as temporary trainer whilst his father is hospitalised	BBC Radio adaptation, 1976
Smokescreen	1972	ISBN 0-718-1103-90	Edward Lincoln, movie actor who does his own stunts	
Slay Ride	1973	ISBN 0-718-11150-8	David Cleveland, Jockey Club chief investigator	
Knockdown	1974	ISBN 0-718-11297-0	Jonah Dereham, bloodstock agent	
High Stakes	1975	ISBN 0-718-11393-4	Steven Scott, toy inventor	
In the Frame	1976	ISBN 0-718-11527-9	Charles Todd, painter	TV film, 1989
Risk	1977	ISBN 0-718-11636-4	Roland Britten, accountant	
Trial Run	1978		Randall Drew, gentleman and ex-jockey	
Whip Hand	1979	ISBN 0-718-11845-6	Sid Halley, private investigator	Edgar Award winner Gold Dagger winner Second Sid Halley novel BBC Radio adaptation, 1991
Reflex	1980	ISBN 978-0-7181-1950-8	Philip Nore, jockey and photographer	
Twice Shy	1981	ISBN 0-718-12056-6	Jonathan Derry, teacher, second part narrated by younger brother William Derry, jockey and later racing manager	Adapted into a ZX Spectrum and Amstrad CPC computer game, published by Mosaic Publishing; TV film, 1989
Banker	1982	ISBN 0-718-12173-2	Tim Ekaterin, merchant banker	
The Danger	1983		Andrew Douglas, anti-kidnapping consultant	
Proof	1984	ISBN 0-718-12481-2	Tony Beach, wine merchant	Japan Adventure Fiction Association Prize winner BBC Radio adaptation, 1997
Break In	1985	ISBN 0-718-12597-5	Kit Fielding, jockey	
Bolt	1986	ISBN 0-718-12756-0	Kit Fielding, jockey	BBC Radio adaptation, 1994
A Jockey's Life	1986	ISBN 0-399-13179-5 / 978-0-399-13179-0 (USA edition)		Biography of Lester Piggott, later reissued as Lester
Hot Money	1987	ISBN 0-718-12851-6	Ian Pembroke, former asst trainer, amateur jockey	
The Edge	1988	ISBN 0-718-13179-7	Tor Kelsey, investigator for the Jockey Club	
Straight	1989	ISBN 0-718-13180-0	Derek Franklin, jockey and later jewelry firm owner	
Longshot	1990	ISBN 0-718-13447-8	John Kendall, writer and survival skills expert	
Comeback	1991		Peter Darwin, diplomat	
Driving Force	1992	ISBN 0-718-13482-6	Freddie Croft, horse transport company owner	
Decider	1993	ISBN 0-718-13602-0	Lee Morris, architect	
Wild Horses	1994	ISBN 0-718-13603-9	Thomas Lyon, film director	
Come to Grief	1995	ISBN 0-7181-3753-1	Sid Halley, private investigator	Edgar Award winner Japan Adventure Fiction Association Prize winner Third Sid Halley novel
To the Hilt	1996	ISBN 0-718-142136	Alexander Kinloch, painter	
10 LB. Penalty	1997	ISBN 0-718-14245-4	Ben Juliard, jockey and politician's son	
Field of 13	1998	ISBN 0-718-14351-5		short stories: 1. "Raid at Kingdom Hill" (first appeared in The Times, 1975); 2. "Dead on Red"; 3. "Song for Mona"; 4. "Bright White Star" (first appeared in Cheshire Life, Christmas 1979); 5. "Collision Course"; 6. "Nightmare" (first appeared in The Times, 13 April 1974); 7. "Carrot for a Chestnut" (first appeared in Sports Illustrated, 1970); 8. "The Gift" (first appeared as "A Day of Wine and Roses" in Sports Illustrated, 1973); 9. "Spring Fever" (first appeared in Women's Own magazine, 1980); 10. "Blind Chance" (first appeared as "Twenty-one Good Men and True" in Verdict of Thirteen: A Detection Club Anthology, 1979); 11. "Corkscrew"; 12. "The Day of the Losers" (first appeared in Horse and Hound, February 1977); 13. "Haig's Death"
Second Wind	1999	ISBN 0-718-14408-2	Perry Stuart, meteorologist	
Shattered	2000	ISBN 0-718-14453-8	Gerard Logan, glass blower	
Under Orders	2006	ISBN 978-0-330-44833-8	Sid Halley, private investigator	Japan Adventure Fiction Association Prize winner Fourth Sid Halley
Dead Heat	2007	ISBN 978-0-399-15476-8	Max Moreton, chef	with Felix Francis
Silks	2008	ISBN 978-0-7181-5457-8	Geoffrey Mason, barrister	with Felix Francis
Even Money	2009	ISBN 978-0-399-15591-8	Ned Talbot, bookmaker	with Felix Francis
Crossfire	2010	US ISBN 978-0-399-15681-6; UK ISBN 978-0-7181-5663-3	Captain Tom Forsyth, military officer	with Felix Francis
Dick Francis's Gamble	2011	ISBN 978-1-4104-3870-6	Nicholas "Foxy" Foxton, financial adviser	written after Dick Francis's death by Felix Francis
Dick Francis's Bloodline	2012	ISBN 978-1-4104-5223-8	Mark Shillington, racing commentator	written after Dick Francis's death by Felix Francis
Dick Francis's Refusal	2013	ISBN 978-0-3991-6081-3	Sid Halley, former private investigator	written after Dick Francis's death by Felix Francis; Fifth Sid Halley novel
Dick Francis's Damage	2014	ISBN 978-0-3991-6822-2	Jeff Hinkley, BHA investigator	written after Dick Francis's death by Felix Francis
Front Runner: A Dick Francis Novel	2015	ISBN 978-1-4059-1522-9	Jeff Hinkley, BHA investigator	written after Dick Francis's death by Felix Francis
Triple Crown: A Dick Francis Novel	2016	ISBN 978-0-3995-7470-2	Jeff Hinkley, BHA investigator	written after Dick Francis's death by Felix Francis
Pulse: A Dick Francis Novel	2017	ISBN 978-0-3995-7474-0	Chris Rankin, Doctor	written after Dick Francis's death by Felix Francis; Dr Rankin is the first female protagonist/narrator in any of the books
Crisis: A Dick Francis Novel	2018	ISBN 978-0-5255-3676-5	Harrison Foster, Crisis Manager	written after Dick Francis's death by Felix Francis
Guilty Not Guilty: A Dick Francis Novel	2019	ISBN 978-0-5255-3679-6	Bill Russel, racing steward	written after Dick Francis's death by Felix Francis
Iced: A Dick Francis Novel	2021	ISBN 978-1-471-19661-4	Miles Pussett, former steeplechase jockey, now tobogganist	written after Dick Francis's death by Felix Francis
Hands Down: A Dick Francis Novel	2022	ISBN 978-1-63910-294-5	Sid Halley, former private investigator	written after Dick Francis's death by Felix Francis; Sixth Sid Halley novel
No Reserve: A Dick Francis Novel	2023	ISBN 978-1-804-18322-9	Theo Jennings, auctioneer	written after Dick Francis's death by Felix Francis
Syndicate: A Dick Francis Novel	2024	ISBN 978-1-804-18328-1	Chester Newton, racing syndicate organiser	written after Dick Francis's death by Felix Francis

== See also ==
- John Francome
- Nat Gould
