= Nellie Griswold Francis =

Suffragist and civil rights activist

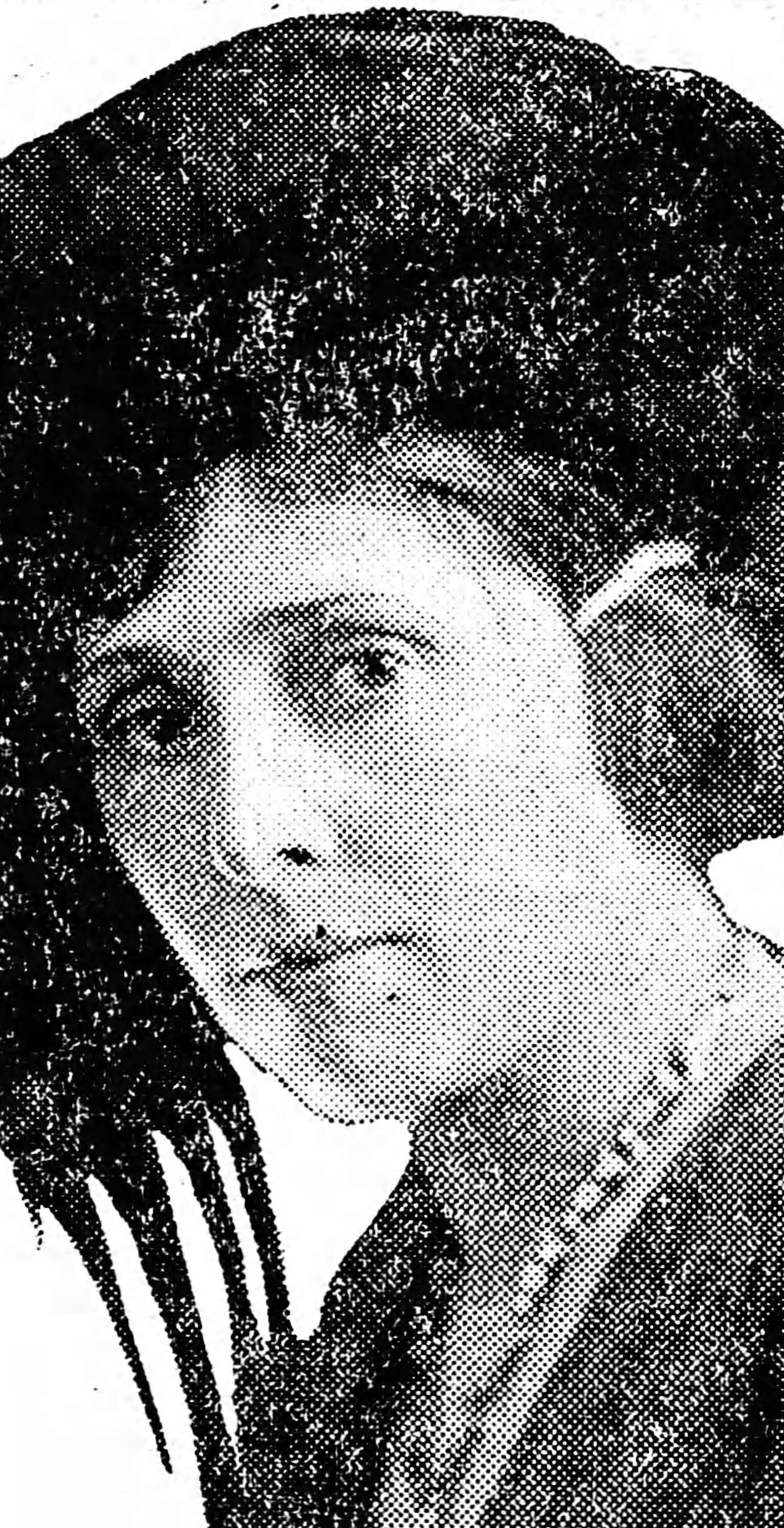
- Francis c. 1921
- Born: Nellie Griswold; November 7, 1874; Nashville, Tennessee
- Died: December 13, 1969 (aged 95); Nashville, Tennessee
- Occupations: Suffragist, anti-lynching activist
- Known for: Minnesota Anti-Lynching Bill, 1921

Nellie F. Griswold Francis (November 7, 1874 – December 13, 1969) was an African-American suffragist, civic leader, and civil rights activist. Francis founded and led the Everywoman Suffrage Club, an African-American suffragist group that helped win women the right to vote in Minnesota. She initiated, drafted, and lobbied for the adoption of a state anti-lynching bill that was signed into law in 1921. When she and her lawyer husband, William T. Francis, bought a home in a white neighborhood, they were the targets of a Ku Klux Klan terror campaign. In 1927, she moved to Monrovia, Liberia with her husband when he was appointed U.S. envoy to Liberia. He died there from yellow fever in 1929. Francis is one of 25 women honored for their roles in achieving the women's right to vote in the Minnesota Woman Suffrage Memorial on the grounds of the State Capitol.

== Early life ==
Nellie Griswold Francis was born in Nashville, Tennessee, on November 7, 1874. Her parents were Maggie Seay and Thomas Garrison Griswold, and she had a sister, Lula Griswold Chapman, who died in 1925. Her grandmother was Nellie Seay (1814–1931), a house slave to Colonel Robert Allen, a Tennessee congressman. Her aunt on her mother's side, Juno Frankie Pierce, was also a prominent suffragist and civil rights activist.

Francis attended Knowles Street School, the first school in Nashville to employ African-American teachers. Her family moved to Saint Paul, Minnesota in 1883. She was the only African American among 84 students graduating from her high school in Saint Paul in 1891. She gave a passionate talk at the high school's commencement titled "The Race Problem", winning second place for oratory.

Francis was offered scholarships for a college and a drama school, but took a stenography course. She began working as a stenographer at the Great Northern Railway in 1891, and later with the Western Publishing Company.

In addition to her work and community activism, Francis enjoyed singing and acting, sometimes combining her enjoyment of performing with the causes to which she was committed. In 1892, for example, The Appeal reported that "several young ladies will conduct a mock trial, Misses Fannie Dodd and Nellie Griswold will act as lawyers. Every one must come and see this, one of the most novel affairs of the season. This is pushing women's rights". As well as performing, she also wrote and produced, including a play called "Magic Mirrors".

== Suffragist and anti-lynching activism ==
"Your children will reap the harvest of our solidarity,—of our determination to stand together, to fight together, and, if needs be, to die together; for they are dying, every day, the men and women of our race, martyrs to lynch-law, the fiery stake and the awful savagery of peonage; that these, your children, may know full liberty and an equal chance in life. Or they must reap in the bitterness of sorrow the fruits of our passivity and indifference; the frittering of our strength by suffering, petty strife and narrow jealousies to becloud the larger vision of our responsibility to coming generations."

— Nellie Griswold Francis

In 1914, Francis resigned from her job to devote herself full-time to community work and civil rights activism, particularly women's suffrage and racial discrimination and violence. Across her life, she was involved in national civil rights networks, attending a dinner in honor of W.E.B. du Bois, and visiting with Booker T. Washington's wife. She attended the 1916 National Republican Convention at which her husband was an elector, and met President Harding in 1921.

Among many activities, including fundraising for a pipe organ for her church, Francis was president of the Baptist Missionary Circle and secretary of the Tri-State Women's Baptist Convention. She also served as the president of the Minnesota State Federation of Colored Women's Clubs, the board of the local NAACP chapter, and was active in the Republican Party. She held shorthand classes in her home when African-Americans were unable to enter business schools.

The two issues for which Francis is best known are founding an African-American suffragist group, and anti-lynching activism. It was an intense time in both areas. After World War I, there was a sharp increase in lynching, as well as an increase in migration of African-Americans from the southern to northern states, including Minnesota. In 1918, Francis led a resolution of her church, the Pilgrim Baptist Church, against lynching and burning of people that was delivered to the President of the United States.

That year, white suffragists in Minnesota rejected an amendment that would have secured women's suffrage, in exchange for excluding black women from the vote: "keen would have been my disappointment if they had failed to make this sacrifice", Francis said. Although it would not come into force till 1920, the battle for women's vote in Minnesota was won in 1919. Francis' group turned its attention to social progress on race, particularly for black women.

In June 1920, Minnesota became a national focus of attention because of the Duluth lynching. Three young African-Americans who worked in a visiting circus, 19-year-old Elias Clayton, 22-year-old Elmer Jackson, and 20-year-old Isaac McGhie, were among a group accused of gang-raping a white woman, although there was no direct evidence a rape occurred. A mob of white people, estimated to be from 1,000 to 10,000 people – a considerable proportion of Duluth's residents, stormed the police station and lynched the young men in the middle of town.

Francis responded by initiating a campaign for legislation, drafting an anti-lynching bill, and using her considerable community and political influence to build support for the law. Her husband was an influential lawyer and member of the Republican party. He supported the anti-lynching bill effort by contacting W.E.B. DuBois at NAACP for data, contributing his legal expertise to the final form of the bill, and lobbying. The campaign included mass meetings, and W.E.B. DuBois traveled to St. Paul to speak at churches in St. Paul and Duluth. The final votes in the legislature were almost unanimous, and the Bill was signed into law in April 1921. Minnesota was reported as the 15th state in the US to pass anti-lynching legislation. The bill's provisions were reported by the NAACP in The Crisis.

The Appeal (also known as National Afro-American newspaper), reported a celebration to honor Francis in detail. In presenting her with a silver loving cup, James Loomis, of the NAACP, said: "Ever since girlhood and her graduation she has devoted the principal activities of her life to the uplift of our race. The creation of the Anti-Lynching Bill and the work, time and energy spent by her in order to secure its passage, proves that her ambition is to help her fellowmen. That law will go down in history as the most important piece of legislation affecting our race that has ever been passed in our state". The anti-lynching law was repealed in Minnesota without comment in 1984.

The Francis' would themselves become the targets of escalating racist abuse and Ku Klux Klan attacks a few years later when they bought a home in a white neighborhood in St. Paul. The couple bought a two-storey house (with a title held in Juno Frankie Pierce's name) in Sargent Avenue, Groveland Park, experiencing an increasingly vicious Ku Klux Klan campaign to stop them moving in. First, the local improvement association offered to buy the house. When they refused, a campaign including marches with burning flares and threatening letters and phone calls followed. The Ku Klux Klan burned a cross on the lawn twice, said to typically be the final warning. The Francises moved in, and remained there until they moved to Liberia.

== Liberian years ==
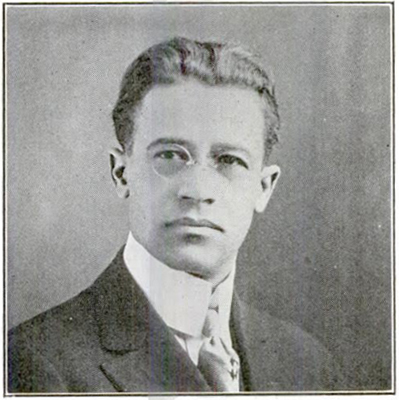
William T. Francis, ca 1904

William T. Francis was a very successful and prominent lawyer, who sought political office on several occasions. He became Minnesota's first African-American diplomat when he was appointed U.S. Minister/Consul General to Liberia in 1927.

In Liberia, he undertook a nine-month investigation into government and high official involvement in slavery and forced labor. W.T. Francis' report was able to show that the country's president, Charles D.B. King, had profited from the selling of young Liberians into forced labor for Spanish plantations on Bioko Island.

The pressure from the Francis report led to a League of Nations investigation, which ultimately resulted in the president and vice president of Liberia resigning. However, he would not live to see this outcome. After a month of intense suffering from yellow fever, which was initially diagnosed as malaria, W.T. Thomas died in Monrovia. A funeral was held at the couple's church, St. Paul's Pilgrim Baptist Church on August 11, 1929. A second funeral service and Masonic burial followed in Nashville.

== Personal and later life ==
Francis met her husband, William T. Francis, when they both worked for a railway company, and they married on August 14, 1893. According to a biographical profile, they had particularly close and happy marriage. Nellie called her husband Billy. They shared commitment to gender, racial, and social progress as well as talent for singing and acting. They formed a strong partnership in life and politics, and often performed together. Their celebration of their 25th wedding anniversary in 1918, including singing, was reported in newspapers. Nellie's sister, Lula, and brother-in-law lived with them in Saint Paul.

After her husband's death, Francis returned to Nashville. In 1930, the United States House of Representatives voted not to grant her the equivalent of a year of her husband's salary, on the grounds that it was not shown that she was dependent on him. However, in 1935, Congress approved the grant. Around that time, Francis was living in Long Beach, California, after attending the 1932 Summer Olympics in Los Angeles.

Francis died on December 13, 1969, age 95. She is buried with her husband in Greenwood Cemetery in Nashville.

== Legacy ==
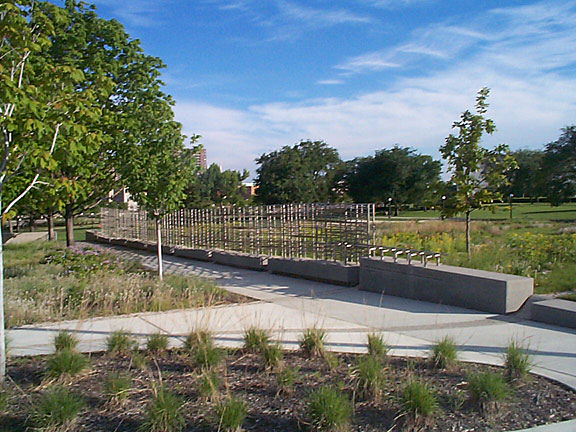
Minnesota Woman Suffrage Memorial

In 1921, Francis was honored with a silver loving cup and a ceremony at the Pilgrim Baptist Church, "on behalf of the race, men and women of St. Paul, as a small token of appreciation for your effort in behalf of the race, in conceiving and working for the consummation of the Anti-Lynch Law passed in the Legislature April 18, 1921".

Francis was honored by the Nashville Chapter of the National Council of Negro Women in a tribute at the Student Union Center of Fisk University in 1962.

On Women's Equality Day, August 26, 2000, the Minnesota Woman Suffrage Memorial was opened on the grounds of the Minnesota State Capitol. Francis is one of 25 women honored for leading the fight for votes for women, each named on a steel trellis in the garden.
