= Moree Gwydir Examiner and General Advertiser =

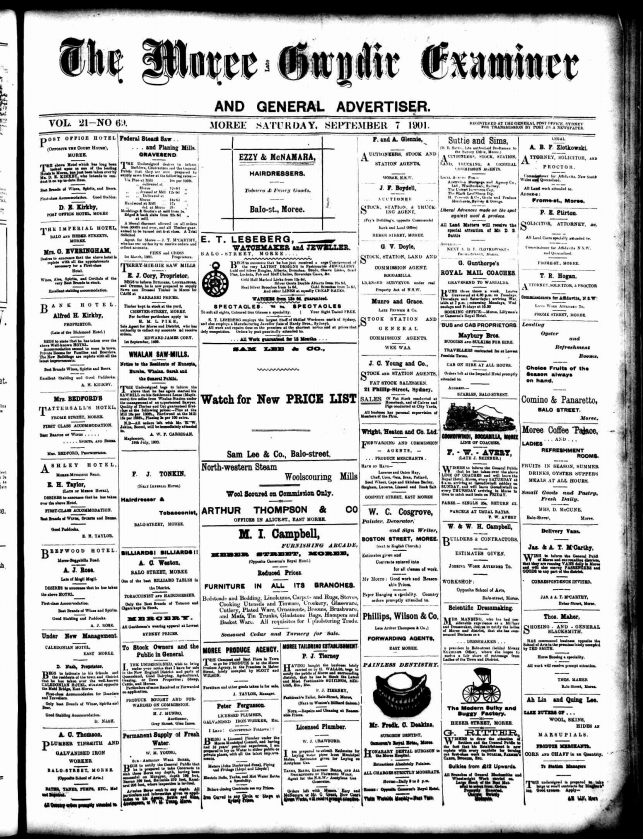
Front page of the Moree Gwydir Examiner and General Advertiser on 7 September 1901

The Moree Gwydir Examiner and General Advertiser was a weekly newspaper published in Moree, New South Wales, Australia from 1883 to 1940. During that time it was also known as: Gwydir Examiner and Moree General Advertiser from 1883 to 1899, Moree Examiner and General Advertiser from 1899 to 1901, and The Moree Gwydir Examiner and General Advertiser from 1901 to 1940.

== History ==
The original publisher and printer of the Gwydir Examiner and Moree General Advertiser was Arthur Edward Vincent from 1883 to 1899. Emma Jane Midgley is thought to have taken over from him after that time.

The Gwydir Examiner and Moree General Advertiser was published under that title until 2 September 1899. Its other title was the Gwydir Examiner.

It then changed its title to the Moree Examiner and General Advertiser on 5 September 1899. It continued under that title until 3 September 1901 when it changed its title to the Moree Gwydir Examiner and General Advertiser on 7 September 1901 (absorbing the Moree News).

The Moree Gwydir Examiner and General Advertiser was first published on 7 September 1901 under this title, by Emma Jane Midgley, and continued under that title until 19 December 1940.

=== Publication history ===
Publication name	Commenced publication	Ceased publication
Gwydir Examiner and Moree General Advertiser	-	1899
Moree Examiner and General Advertiser	1899	1901
The Moree Gwydir Examiner and General Advertiser	1901	1940

== Digitisation ==
Parts of the paper have been digitised as part of the Australian Newspapers Digitisation Program project of the National Library of Australia.

== See also ==
- List of newspapers in Australia
- List of newspapers in New South Wales
