= Lyle Morgan =

Australian rules footballer

Personal information
- Full name: Lionel Robert Morgan
- Born: 15 July 1887; St Kilda, Victoria
- Died: 11 November 1968 (aged 81); Moree, New South Wales
- Original team: Scotch College

Playing career^{1}
Years	Club	Games (Goals)
1906	Melbourne	2 (0)
- ^{1} Playing statistics correct to the end of 1906.

Lionel Robert 'Lyle' Morgan (15 July 1887 – 11 November 1968) was an Australian rules footballer who played with Melbourne in the Victorian Football League (VFL).
