= Moree Champion =

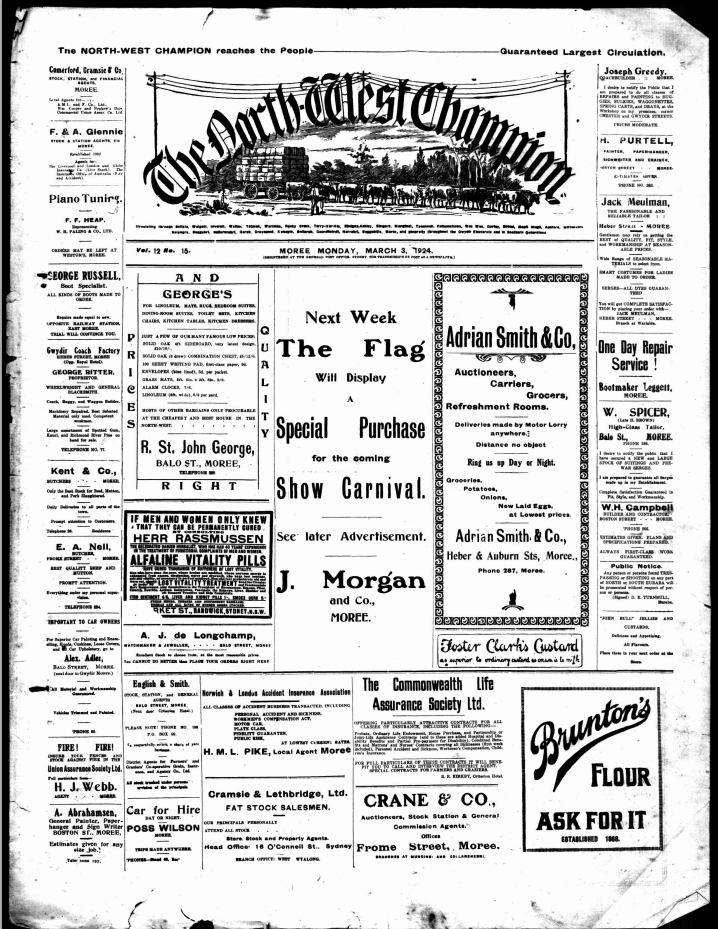
Front page of the North West Champion newspaper, 3 March 1924

The Moree Champion, previously published as the North West Champion, is a weekly English language newspaper published in the Shire of Moree, New South Wales, Australia. The newspaper was first published in 1912. It is owned by Australian Community Media and is published Thursday and distributed throughout the north west region of New South Wales.

== History ==
The paper was first published in 1912 as the North West Champion. In 1968, the newspaper was the first provincial press to convert from letterpress printing to high resolution web offset printing. The newspaper's proprietor, Harry Sullivan, commemorated the change with a new title. On 21 March 1968, the Moree Champion, Vol. 1, No. 1, new series, was published as a sixty four page issue containing some sections in colour.

In September 2024, Australian Community Media announced it will shutter the paper. As of March 2025, however, it is still in print.

== Digitisation ==
The paper has been digitised as part of the Australian Newspapers Digitisation Program hosted by the National Library of Australia in cooperation with the State Library of New South Wales.

== See also ==
- List of newspapers in Australia
