= Freedom Ride (Australia) =

1965 Aboriginal Australian protest bus journey

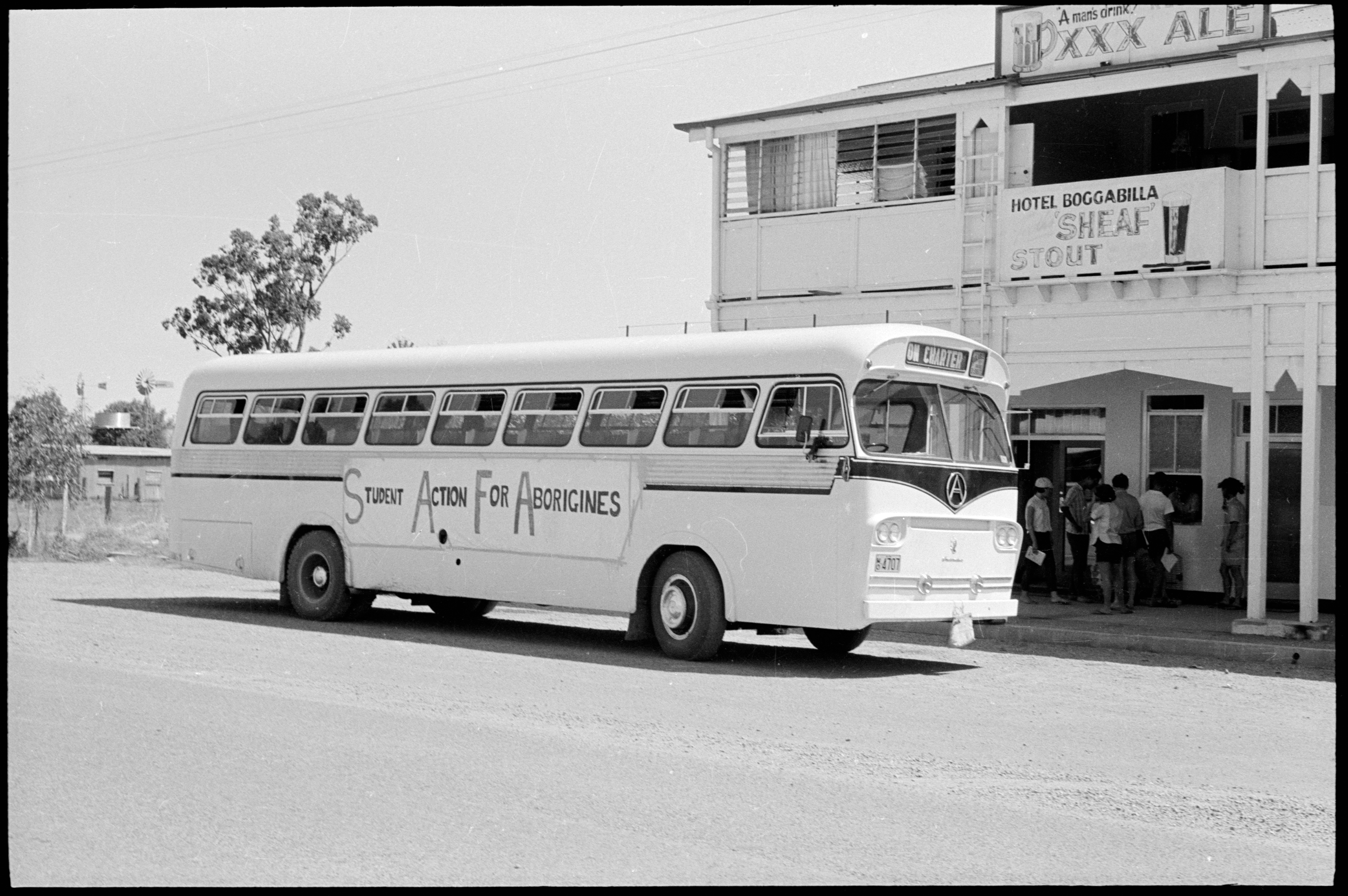
Student Action For Aboriginals (SAFA) bus outside hotel, Boggabilla, New South Wales, February 1965

The Freedom Ride was a 15-day journey undertaken in February 1965 by a group of non-Indigenous and Indigenous Australians in a bus across New South Wales, led by Charles Perkins, an Aboriginal civil rights activist. Most were students from the University of Sydney, who had formed a group called Student Action for Aborigines (SAFA) the previous year. Partly inspired by the Freedom Riders of the American Civil Rights Movement, the group left Sydney in a hired bus on 12 February 1965 and returned on 27 February. What they encountered was de facto segregation; the students protested, picketed, and faced violence, raising the issue of Indigenous rights. They stood protesting for hours at segregated areas such as pools, parks, and pubs, which raised a mixed reception in the country towns. Some violence was encountered in Walgett and Moree. The Freedom Riders' aim was to bring to the attention of the public the extent of racial discrimination in Australia. With significant coverage by both national and international media, it succeeded in this, and is considered a significant event in the history of civil rights for Aboriginal Australians.

== Background ==
In 1964 students from the University of Sydney formed a group called Student Action for Aborigines (SAFA), led by Charles Perkins, an Arrernte man born in Alice Springs who was the first Indigenous Australian to graduate tertiary education. They were inspired by the American Civil Rights Movement and the anti-apartheid movement in South Africa.

A 1964 SAFA protest against racial segregation in the United States had brought comments from members of the public urging students to look closer to home if they wanted to draw attention to racial discrimination. At the time of the Freedom Ride in 1965, some Aboriginal People of Australia were counted separately in the census and their rights as citizens were regularly ignored. Inspired by the Freedom Riders of the American Civil Rights Movement, a group of SAFA students travelled into New South Wales country towns on what some of them considered a fact-finding mission.

== Participants ==
There were 29 people on the bus when it left Sydney; four left and five more joined during the trip. The Freedom Riders were: Charles Perkins, fellow student and recipient of a recently introduced Abschol scholarship, Gumbaynggirr man Gary Williams (who joined the bus at Bowraville), Ann Curthoys (who kept diary entries that later became the basis of a memoir of the events), Jim Spigelman (later Chief Justice of the Supreme Court of New South Wales) Aidan Foy, Alan Outhred, Alex Mills, Barry Corr, Beth Hansen, Bob Gallagher, Brian Aarons (who later held senior roles with Reconciliation Australia and the federal government), Chris Page, Colin Bradford, Darce Cassidy, David Pepper, Derek Molloy, Hall Greenland, Helen Gray, John Butterworth, John Gowdie, John Powles, Judith Rich, Louise Higham, Machteld Hali, Norm Mackay, Paddy Dawson, Pat Healy, Ray Leppik, Rick Collins, Robyn Iredale, Sue Johnston, Sue Reeves, Warwick Richards, and Wendy Golding. Aboriginal nurse and activist Isobelle Mary Ferguson, daughter of Bill Ferguson, also joined the Freedom Ride.

Perkins and Williams were the first Aboriginal students at the university, while the other students came from a variety of family, religious, and political backgrounds; The only thing they had in common was "a concern for Indigenous rights, and a commitment to non-violent direct action" (Ann Curthoys, 2002).

== Communities visited ==
The total journey took 15 days. The hired bus left the university around midnight on Friday 12 February. It travelled across the traditional lands of several Aboriginal peoples, including Wiradjuri, Kawambarai, Gumbaynggirr, Gamilaraay, Bundjalung, Dhan-gadi, Ngaku, and Ngumbarl people. Aboriginal communities visited varied in their welcomes: from strong support and in some cases participation, to fear about consequences.

The first two towns they went to were Wellington and Gulargambone. Protests were not conducted there. Instead the locals were asked questions that affirmed perceptions of how bad discrimination against Indigenous Australians was in rural areas.

=== Walgett ===
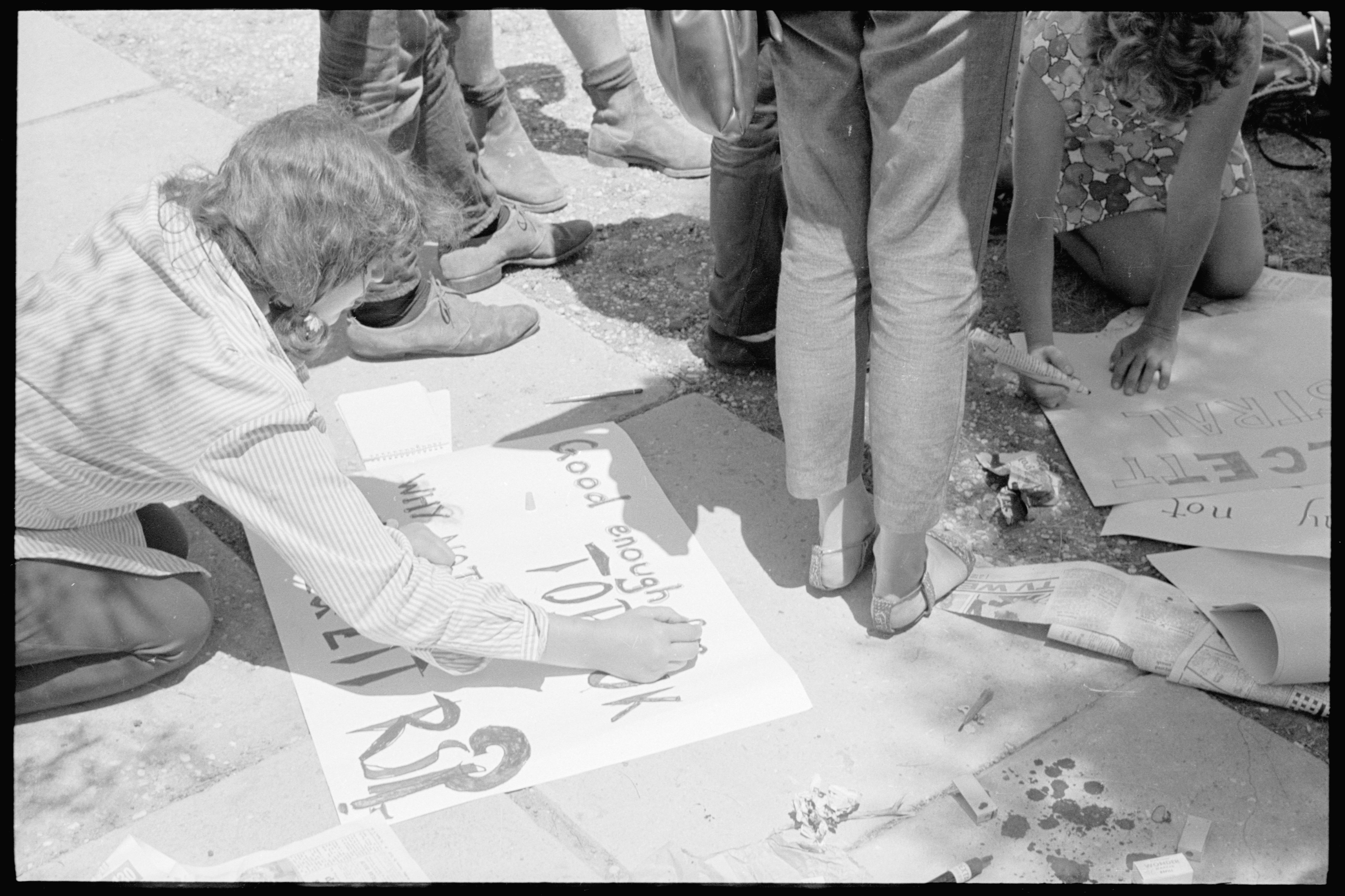
Preparing picket signs, Walgett, New South Wales, 1965

Moving on to Walgett, some clear cases of racial discrimination were apparent. It proved to be the first real challenge for the Freedom Riders. They spent their first day conducting interviews to obtain information about segregation and racial discrimination and found that the cinema, the Returned Servicemen's League (RSL) club, the town's two hotels and a dress shop were all segregated. The Freedom Riders picketed the Walgett RSL club from noon until sunset, holding placards stating "Walgett: Australian's disgrace", "Bar the Colour Bar", "Good enough for Tobruk – why not Walgett RSL?". The crowd of around 300 jeered and heckled, while Perkins spoke, along with local Aboriginal activists Harry Hall and George Rose. While their protest did little to change the attitudes of the townsfolk, they encouraged the Aboriginal community to push for change. Aboriginal people who participated in pickets were bitter at the ongoing discrimination they experienced in their town and they continued to protest and agitate for desegregation in the establishments that still upheld a colour ban after the protesters left. However, a report by Bruce Maxwell, a cadet reporter for The Herald, brought the SAFA Freedom Ride into the national spotlight. The Sydney Morning Herald and The Daily Mirror newspapers as well as TV and radio now began to report on the next stage of the Freedom Ride in Moree.

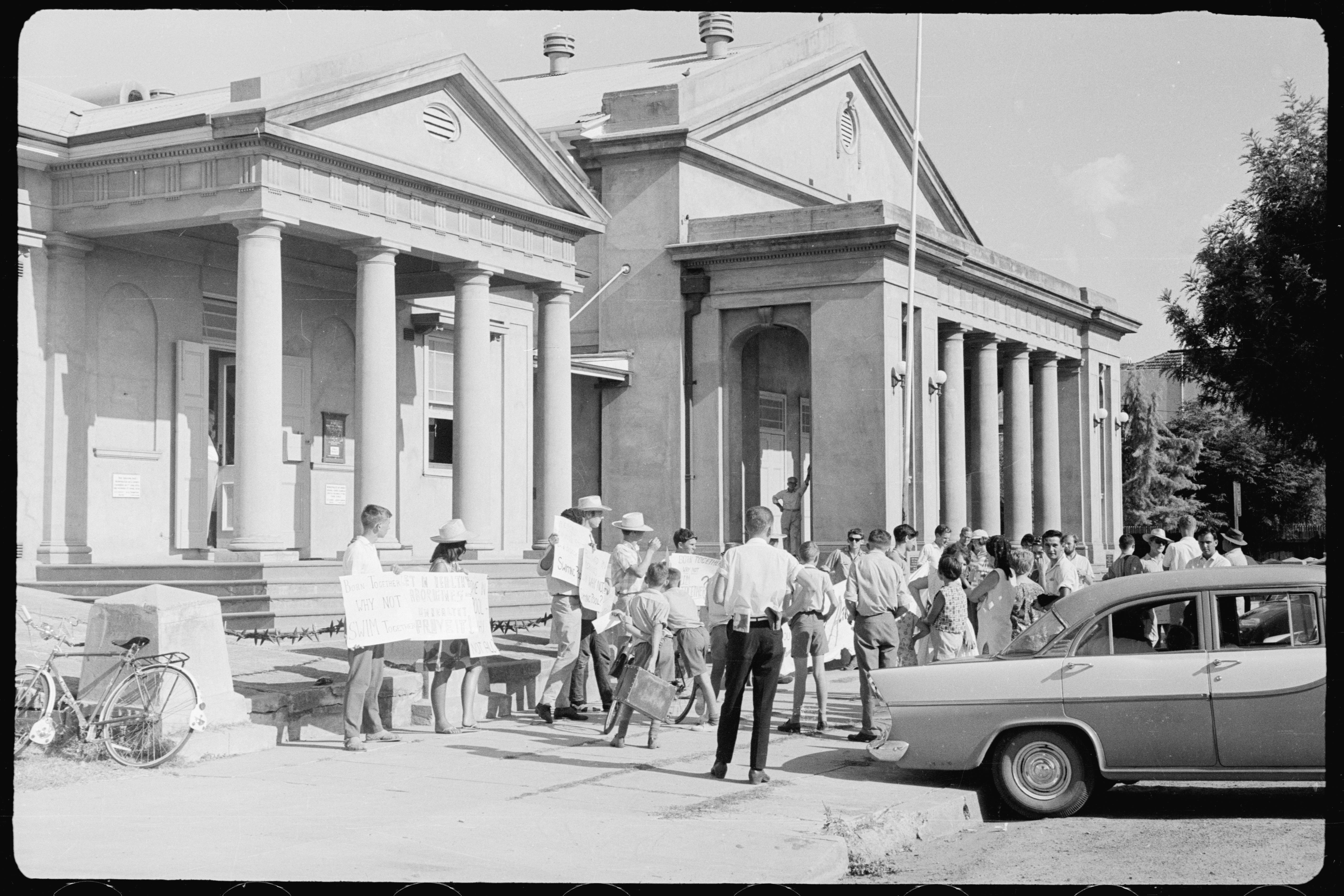
Student Action for Aborigines protest outside Moree Town Hall

After the RSL protest, the group was evicted from its accommodation in the Church of England hall, so the bus left Walgett around 10pm, escorted by police for some distance. After leaving Walgett, an unidentified driver rammed the bus, forcing it off the road, so the bus turned back to Walgett to report the incident to police. Because cadet reporter Bruce Maxwell had come along, the incident made headlines in the Sydney Morning Herald, attracting the attention of international media. Some reports compared the treatment of Aboriginal Australians to the racism and segregation in the Deep South of the United States.

=== Moree ===
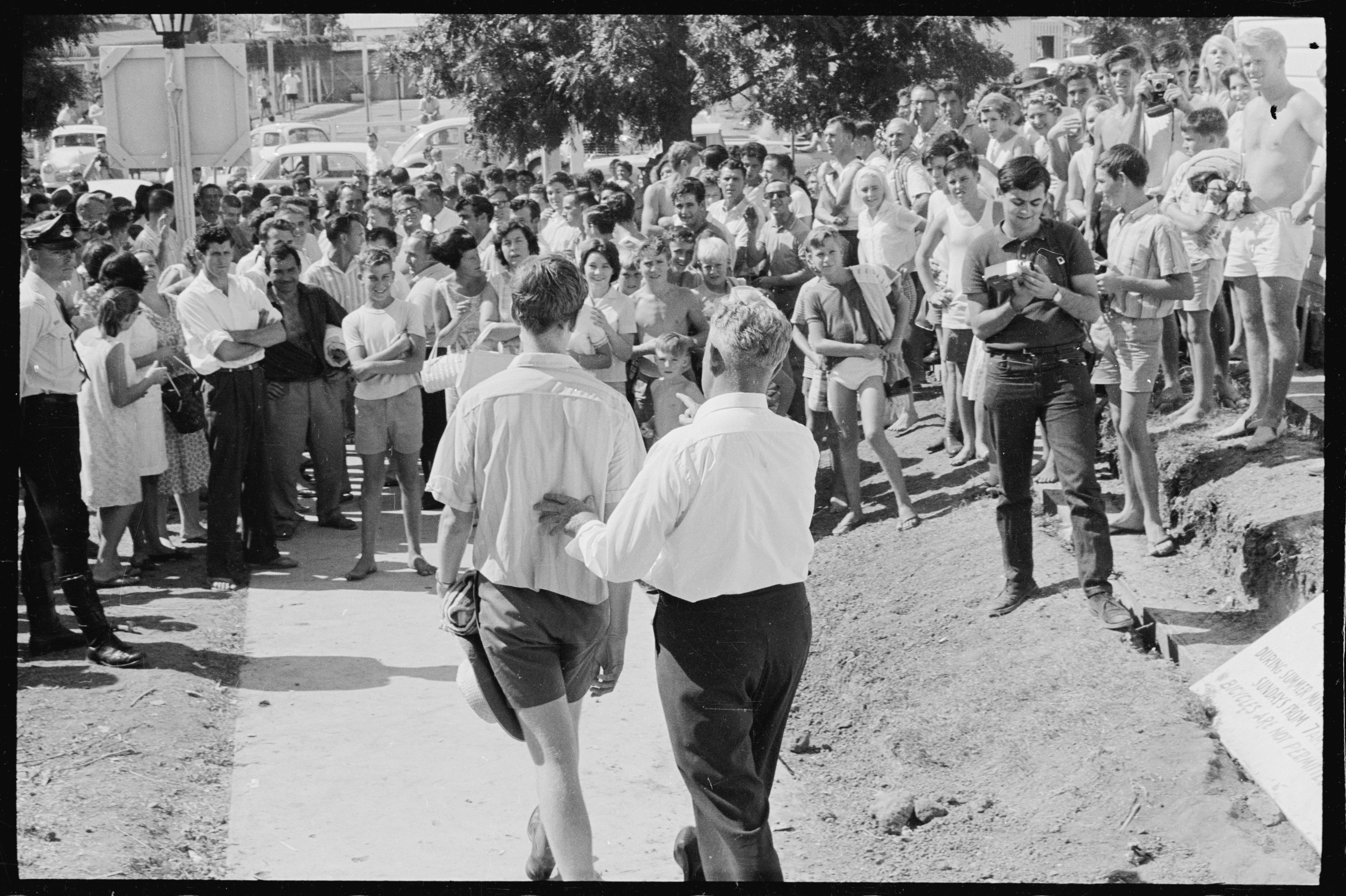
Mayor William Llyod escorts student Action For Aboriginals (SAFA) member away from swimming pool, Moree, NSW, 1965

Moree was the site of a violent conflict during the Freedom Ride when the students tried to assist children from a nearby reserve to enter the Moree Swimming Baths, and were obstructed by supporters of the race-ban. At that time, Aboriginal people were not allowed in pubs or clubs or at the swimming pool, or to walk on the sidewalk, or play football in the local team. The local cinema was segregated – Blacks had to sit in the front rows. These were all enforcements of by-laws introduced in 1955.

The Freedom Riders collected a number of children from the local mission, including nine-year-old Dan Moree (son of Lyall Munro Snr, brother of Lyall Munro Jnr, who was 13 at the time), and tried to gain entry into the swimming pool, supported by the Thompson's Row community and local businessman Bob Brown. After initially being refused entry, police and local aldermen allowed them to enter. Perkins then brought another group of 20 Aboriginal children to the pool.

Lyall Munro Snr told NITV in 2017 that he and the Moree Aboriginal Advancement Committee had been fighting to change the town's segregationist by-laws for years before the Freedom Riders arrived, but not in a confrontational way. "...So we stood and watched in the crowd. It was their day and it was an ugly scene, pretty rowdy, pretty wild – a lot of violence". The event was widely covered by the media at home and internationally, and it caught the attention of the Australian public, proving to be a "seminal moment" in the history of Australia. A public meeting took place in the town afterwards, and the decision was taken to lift the colour bar on the pool. However, within 48 hours the ban had been reinstated by the council. The students returned, and, with support from local Aboriginal community members and the Mehi Mission, Perkins, Brown, and nine Aboriginal children sought entry to the pool. A large, hostile crowd gathered, and verbally abused and physically assaulted the group. Eventually the pool was closed, the mayor told the students that he would rescind the ban, and police then escorted the students safely onto the bus and out of town.

After the trouble in Moree, the bus driver resigned and a replacement was sent out by Saints Bus Company.

=== Other towns ===
Other towns that were visited include Boggabilla, Lismore, Bowraville, Dubbo, Kempsey, Orange, and Taree. They were mostly met with hostility by non-Indigenous inhabitants, who saw them as "long-haired, clueless kids interfering in communities they didn't understand". The riders described the discrimination in Bowraville as the worst they encountered.

The bus returned to Sydney with its 34 passengers on 27 February 1965, after over two weeks on the road. They were greeted by a group of University of New South Wales students, who announced that they were planning to undertake a similar trip, to uncover segregation practices in other towns.

== Impact and legacy ==
=== Aftermath ===
In the immediate aftermath of the Freedom Ride, SAFA was the target of criticism as well as congratulations, donations and political commentary. Perkins and some of the other students were invited to speak at political events, and new branches of SAFA formed on university campuses across Australia.

After the students' departure from the towns, some changes were instituted, but the final repeal of the Moree pool ban took a while to be resolved. Some members of SAFA later returned to towns they had picketed to support local Aboriginal communities in their ongoing work against discrimination. Perkins and other activists returned to Walgett later on to assist in the fight against the colour bar applied at the Oasis Hotel. Most of the students got on with their lives after the trip, with some developing careers that progressed Aboriginal affairs, including lawyers, teachers, health administrators, and political campaigners. Ann Curthoys became a historian, with much of her work focused on the origins and nature of racism. Gary Williams also campaigned for the 1967 referendum, and later became head of the Muurrbay Aboriginal Language and Culture Co-operative at Nambucca Heads.

The Freedom Ride resulted in Aboriginal children having full access to the Moree Baths and Swimming Pool, after the 1955 by-laws were rescinded. National coverage of the event, showing the hostility displayed towards Aboriginal people and the extreme inequality between Aboriginal and non-Aboriginal Australians, shocked many people in Australia. This empowered existing Aboriginal protest groups to continue to resist discrimination, and many Australians were moved to pressure for change. The international coverage drew attention to local segregationist policies and practices in Australia, adding pressure for change.

Crux, the Australian Student Christian Movement journal, ran a special issue on "Aborigines", which included a guest editorial on the significance of the Freedom Ride. Cartoonists including John Frith also addressed the topic.

The New York Times and other overseas newspapers reported on the events; the Freedom Ride was reported in Europe, the UK, Asia, Africa, and the US. Under this spotlight, Australians and their politicians felt ashamed, and sought to rectify matters to some extent. Soon after the Freedom Ride, the New South Wales Aborigines Welfare Board announced that it would spend £65,000 on housing in Moree.

Later in 1965, Perkins related what happened to the 200 people attending the Federal Council for the Advancement of Aborigines and Torres Strait Islanders (FCAATSI) conference in Canberra.

The Australian Black Power movement emerged in Redfern in Sydney, Fitzroy, Melbourne, and South Brisbane, following the Freedom Ride, and there followed a period of Aboriginal activism across Australia.

Public debate after the event created an atmosphere that was more open to change. The Freedom Ride has been credited with paving the way for the passing of the 1967 referendum, which led to the removal of discriminatory sections from the Australian Constitution, and enabled the federal government to take direct action in Aboriginal affairs. The Racial Discrimination Act 1975 made it illegal throughout Australia to discriminate against a person due to their race, descent, national or ethnic origin.

The Freedom Ride was one of several events that opened the way to the idea of Indigenous land rights in Australia, in particular the passing of the Aboriginal Land Rights Act 1983 in New South Wales.

SAFA disbanded in 1966.

=== Ongoing impact ===
The Freedom Ride opened the eyes of non-Indigenous Australians, especially those living in cities, to the racial segregation that was occurring in their country, as well as revealing it to a world audience. It is remembered today as a significant event in the history of civil rights for Indigenous Australians, and a turning point for race relations.

In Bowraville, a house that the students helped build still remains, and there is a plaque dedicated to the group at the refurbished cinema. Moree had its first Aboriginal Deputy Mayor, Wayne Tighe, and two Aboriginal councillors in 2024.

The Freedom Ride has continued to serve as an inspiration for Aboriginal rights activists.

== Commemorations ==
=== 2005 re-enactment ===
In 2005 another group travelled through New South Wales in a re-enactment of the Freedom Ride. Led by Gomeroi man and student leader Kyol Blakeney, the group included several of the original Riders. Their aim was to determine how much had changed in 40 years and foster debate on reconciliation. Although the 2005 event focussed on reconciliation, experiences of discrimination were reported and the poor housing conditions for some Aboriginal people were noted. The Minister for Aboriginal Affairs Andrew Refshauge was presented with the findings of the 2005 ride, which visited more than 13 communities.

=== 2015 re-enactment ===
To mark the 50th anniversary of the Freedom Ride in 2015, two coaches re-ran the route with several of the original participants and a group of present-day University of Sydney students. This was featured in an episode of the SBS programme Living Black. Participants included original Freedom Riders Robyn Iredale, Alan Outhred, and Pat Healy, who were warmly greeted by local inhabitants, and the occasion was marked by a free concert in Dubbo featuring Paul Kelly and Troy Cassar-Daley.

=== 2025: 60th anniversary ===
On the 60th anniversary of the Freedom Ride in 2025, some of the Freedom Riders and their descendants talked about the impact in an interview with a Guardian reporter, including Ann Curthoys and Gary Williams, who said that things had changed for the better since the ride. His granddaughter is NIDA graduate, actor and playwright Dalara Williams.

A commemoration held in February 2025 was addressed by the Governor of New South Wales, Margaret Beazley, and the granddaughter of Freedom Rider Harry Hall, Amy Townsend. Several people who remembered the bus visiting their towns were featured on the ABC Radio National program Speaking Out, presented by Larissa Behrendt.

Moree Plains Shire Council together with the Moree Local Aboriginal Land Council and community members held a commemoration of the 60th anniversary of the Freedom Ride. The whole community was invited to march on 19 February from Moree Memorial Hall through the town centre to the Moree Artesian Aquatic Centre (MAAC), where they were addressed by community Elders who were there in 1965. Free lunch and entertainment in Jellicoe Park was followed by free entry to the MAAC.

=== Ongoing ===
In the Freedom Ride Memorial Park in Walgett, there is a commemorative installation about the Freedom Ride, with public art and a narrative display, launched in July 2023. To mark the 60th anniversary, in February 2025 the Government of New South Wales announced a grant for the Walgett Aboriginal Medical Service to complete the Freedom Ride Pavilion in the park.

A large-scale mural of the Freedom Riders was installed in the student locker area, outside the David Derham theatre in the Law Building at the University of Melbourne.

New South Wales Government ministers unveiled a blue plaque commemorating the Freedom Ride in Walgett in February 2025, the first of several to be installed in key locations along the route.

== See also ==
- Racism in Australia
