= Mark Wright (rugby league) =

Australian rugby league footballer

Personal information
- Full name: Mark Wright
- Born: 24 July 1956 Moree, New South Wales, Australia
- Died: 11 September 2017 (aged 62) Sydney, New South Wales, Australia

Playing information
- Position: Centre
Club
Years	Team	Pld	T	G	FG	P
1975–79	Newtown Jets	79	34	0	0	102

Mark Wright (1955−2017) was an Australian professional rugby league footballer for the Newtown Jets in the New South Wales Rugby League premiership competition. He was born in Moree, New South Wales. Wright also played one game of representative rugby league for New South Wales, after appearing in only eight first-grade matches. His position of choice was at centre.

== Career playing statistics ==
=== Point scoring summary ===
Games	Tries	Goals	F/G	Points
79	34	-	-	136

=== Matches played ===
Team	Matches	Years
Newtown Jets	79	1975 - 1979
New South Wales	1	1975

== Footnotes ==
- Whiticker, Alan; Hudson, Glen (2007). The Encyclopedia of Rugby League Players. Wetherill Park, New South Wales: Gary Allen Pty Ltd. p. 609. ISBN 978-1-877082-93-1.
