= Moree, New South Wales =

Moree
- Town
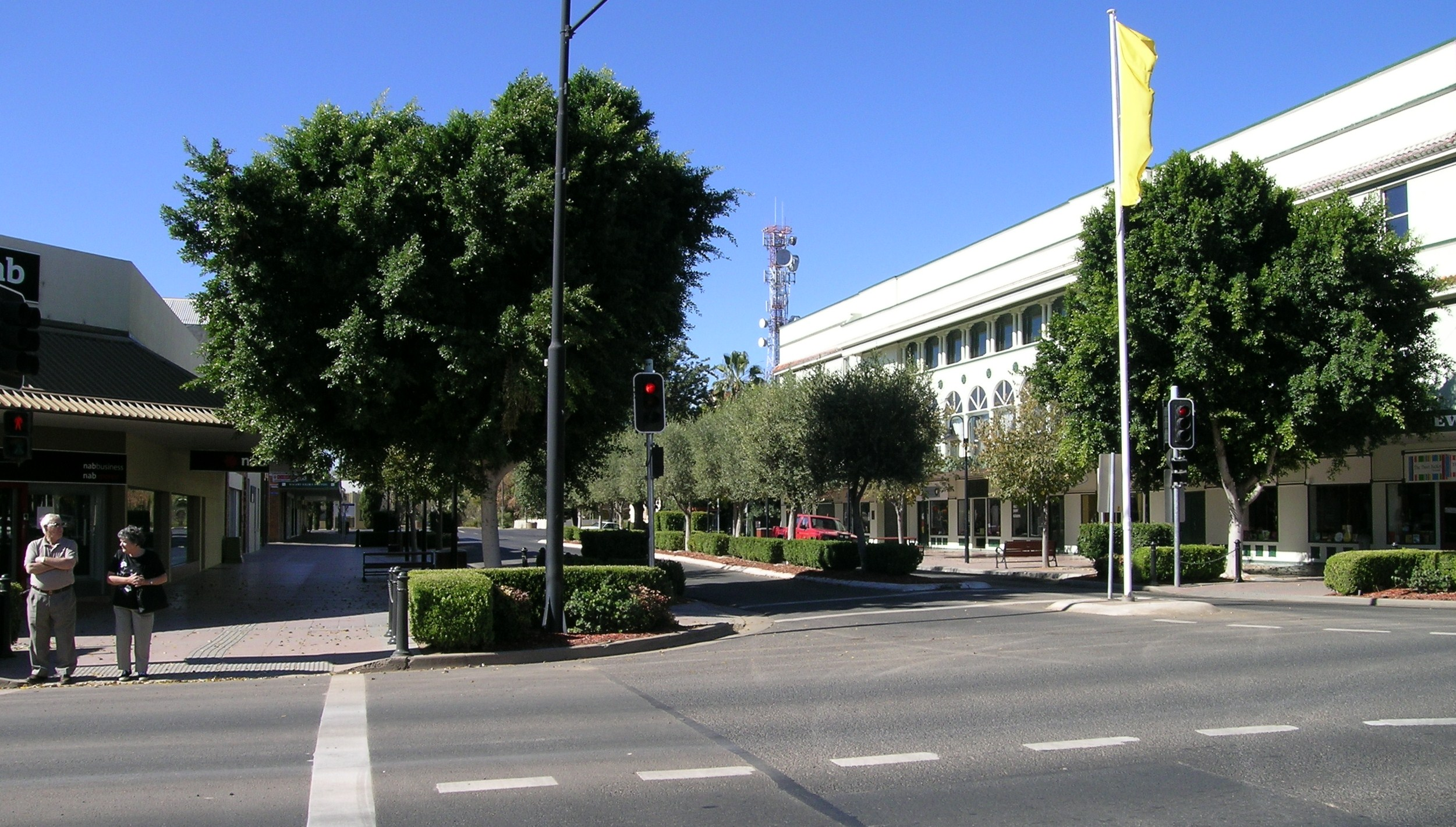
- Main Street, Moree, 2008

- Coordinates: 29°27′57″S 149°50′02″E
- Country: Australia
- State: New South Wales
- LGA: Moree Plains Shire
- Location: 628 km (390 mi) NW of Sydney; 480 km (300 mi) SW of Brisbane; 141 km (88 mi) W of Inverell; 272 km (169 mi) NNW of Tamworth; 129 km (80 mi) SSW of Goondiwindi
- Established: 1862

Government
  - State electorate: Northern Tablelands
  - Federal division: Parkes
- Elevation: 212 m (696 ft)

Population
  - Total: 7,070 (2021 census)
- Postcode: 2400
- County: Courallie
- Mean max temp: 27.0 °C (80.6 °F)
- Mean min temp: 12.6 °C (54.7 °F)
- Annual rainfall: 577.8 mm (22.75 in)

Moree (/mɔːriː/ MOOR-ee) is a town in Moree Plains Shire in northern New South Wales, Australia. It is located on the banks of the Mehi River, in the centre of the rich black-soil plains. It is situated in the Moree Plains Shire. The Newell and Gwydir highways intersect at the town, which can also be reached from Sydney by daily train and air services.

Moree is a major agricultural centre, noted for its role in the Australian cotton-growing industry, which was established there in the early 1960s. It is also well known for artesian hot-spring baths that are renowned for their reputed healing qualities.

At the 2021 census, the town of Moree had a population of 7,070.

== History ==
=== Aboriginal people ===
The Weraerai and Kamilaroi peoples are the original inhabitants of the area, and the town's name is said^{[by whom?]} to come from an Aboriginal word for "rising sun", "long spring", or "water hole". The area was settled by Europeans beginning in the 1840s, who forced the local Aboriginal residents into missions, and later Aboriginal reserves.

The town, and in particular the Moree Baths and Swimming Pool, are known for having been visited by the group of activists on the famous 1965 Freedom Ride. That historic journey through northern NSW, led by Charles Perkins, was designed to bring media attention to discrimination against Indigenous Australians in rural areas.

=== British colonisation ===
In 1832, Major Thomas Mitchell led a large expedition to the district after escaped convict George Clarke told the colonial authorities of the existence of a great river called the "Kindur" that flowed through the region. Clarke had been a bushranger, living a mostly tribal lifestyle with a Kamilaroi clan in the area to the south from 1827 to 1831. He had gained geographical knowledge important to the colonists. In January 1832, Mitchell crossed what is now known as the Mehi River, around ten kilometres east of where the town Moree is now located.

Squatters soon followed in Mitchell's wake, setting up pastoral runs in the vicinity, among which were "Mungie Bundie", established by brothers John Henry Fleming and Joseph Fleming in 1837, "Boolooroo", established by Robert Marshall in 1837, "Wee Bolla Bolla", established by Thomas Simpson Hall in 1838, and "Mooree", which was established by James Cox in 1838, and from which the town gets its name.

Conflict between the colonists and Aboriginal people occurred soon after the arrival of the pastoralists. The Europeans murdered hundreds of Aboriginal people. Both groups of squatters and the New South Wales Mounted Police conducted punitive expeditions against the local Kamilaroi in what was termed at the time "a war of extermination".

For example, a large massacre of Aboriginal peoples occurred at John Cobb's Gravesend station in 1837, while in 1838, Major James Nunn and his mounted police killed at least forty at Waterloo Creek. Some of the surviving Mehi and Gwydir River Aboriginal people fled east to avoid the massacres, pursued by gangs of colonists, including one led by John Henry Fleming, a free settler from Mungie Bundie station. In June 1838, Fleming initiated the Myall Creek massacre. Those Kamilaroi who stayed in the region continued to be killed, including nine who died in a massacre by Charles Eyles at Pallamallawa, also in 1838.

The Kamilaroi also suffered deaths from new infectious diseases, to which they had no immunity, the effects of displacement, and the lack of access to life-sustaining resources. The pastoralists took over their water holes and hunting grounds. The Aboriginal people resorted to poaching livestock to survive, and cycles of retaliation between settlers and the indigenous people continued. The local Aboriginal people mostly suffer second-class status today.

=== Township of Moree ===
In 1851, James Brand and Mary Geddes arrived with their Aboriginal servant girl Jane Laney. They built a general store on the banks of the river in 1852, and added a post office the following year. The family sold up and moved to the Hunter Region in 1857, but James died in 1858. The widowed Mary, left with six children to support, returned to Moree and, in 1861, opened the community's first inn.

Moree was gazetted as a town in 1862, with land sales proceeding that year.

A court of petty sessions was established in 1863. A severe flood occurred in 1864. The first constable arrived in 1865 and a police station was set up. The first church (Wesleyan Methodist) was built in 1867, when the town had a population of 43.

After closer settlement was initiated, agriculture emerged as a thriving industry on the fertile flood plains. A bank was set up in 1876, and a local newspaper was first published in 1881, at which time the population was 295.

The town became a municipality in 1890. During 1894, construction of the Federation-style lands office started, with the ground floor completed by the end of the year. A second storey was added in 1903. The building is now heritage listed.

In 1895, the Great Artesian Basin, which lies under Moree, was tapped. A bore was sunk to 3,000 ft (910 m) in order to provide water for agricultural use, but it proved to be unsuitable for that purpose. The bore yields more than thirteen megalitres of water daily.

The railway reached Moree in 1887, when the Mungindi line was opened, proving a passenger service to Sydney. The railway increased access to markets and goods for both producers and consumers in the town.

Wheat cultivation increased after World War II, and a flour mill was opened at Moree in 1951. The first commercial pecan nut farm was established on the Gwydir Highway east of Moree in 1966. The Trawalla Pecan Nut Farm is the largest pecan farm in the southern hemisphere, with about 75,000 trees. In 1994, the Gwydir Olive Grove Company was established and two Moree families started producing olive oil from trees grown in the area.

Moree was one of the destinations of the famous 1965 Freedom Bus ride, a historic trip through northern NSW, led by activist Charles Perkins, aimed at bringing media attention to discrimination against Indigenous Australians. Urban Australians were made aware of racial segregation in rural Australia, in particular at the Moree Baths and Swimming Pool. When the activists tried to desegregate the pool they "were pelted with eggs and rotten fruit". Aboriginal people were also refused entry to pubs and theatres.

At the Moree swimming pool, after the Freedom Riders confronted them, the local council and pool management agreed to allow Indigenous children to swim in the pool outside school hours.

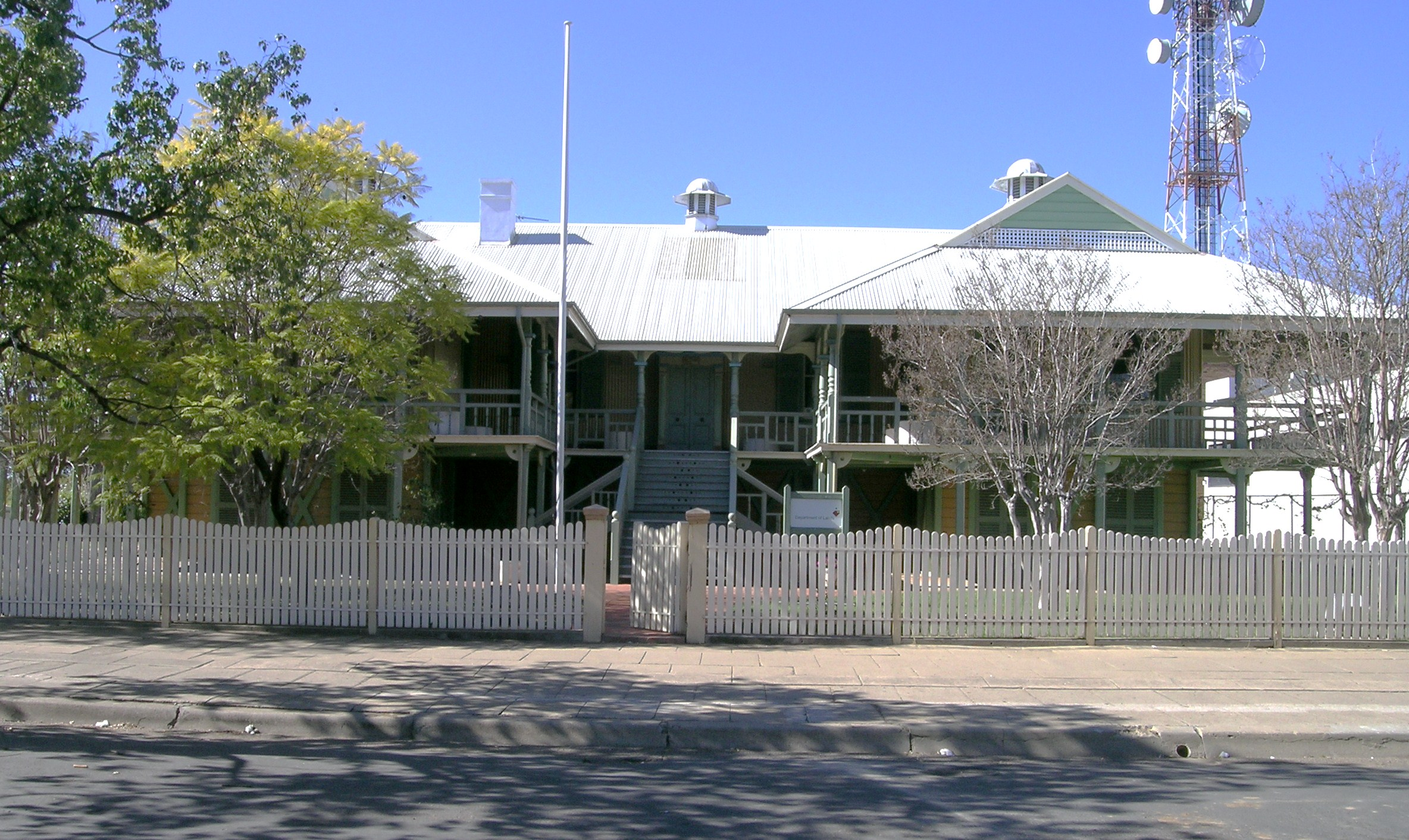
Moree Lands Office, Frome Street, 2008

Tensions between Aboriginal and Europeans have continued, along with discrimination. In 1982, following a large, racially-charged brawl between young white and black men, gangs of white men went around Moree shooting at Aboriginal people. Geoffrey Wilmot, Warren Ledingham, Steven Delamothe and Ian Bowen, armed with semi-automatic rifles and shot-guns, wounded several Aboriginal people, and killed nineteen-year-old Ronald McIntosh. Ledingham and Delamothe were later found guilty of manslaughter.

=== Aboriginal missions and reserves ===
After the New South Wales colonial government established the Aboriginal Protection Board (APB) in 1883, it developed Aboriginal reserves, where the indigenous people were supposed to live. The so-called Aborigines Protection Act 1909 enabled the government to conduct forced removals of children from the reserves, for education and welfare. Children of mixed race, called half-caste, were among those removed, so that they could be raised by white people. To avoid that, Aboriginal families often left the reserves to escape white oversight, setting up fringe camps around towns.

The Moree Mission Aboriginal School was operating by 1933.

Aboriginal people moved from the Terry Hie Hie reserve, south-east of Moree, in the early 1920s to escape the forced removals by the APB of Aboriginal and "half-caste" children from their families. They created an informal settlement at Moree known as Top Camp, which existed until 1967. Steel Bridge Camp and Top Camp were both associated with Terry Hie Hie.

Middle Camp was established on the other side of town, next to the Mehi River, and Bottom Camp further downstream. In 1953, the latter camp was enlarged into a station known as Mehi Crescent Reserve or Mehi Mission.

In 1953, "Moree Aborigines' Station" was described as "a little over two miles west of the town on the left bank of the Mehi". C. F. Boughton, in an article in the North West Champion, described what the New South Wales Aborigines Welfare Board was doing in its 19 Aboriginal reserves for "the uplift and welfare of the aborigines in this district".

The station was managed by a Mr E. Morgan. It had a school with a headmaster and two assistants, where girls were taught cookery and sewing. There were 118 students at the school and some were brought by bus from nearby camps. The residents had formed a Progressive Association in 1951. They had a public address system and a football club, which played in the district competition. The manager's wife ran a girl guides troop and there was a boys' club.

An Aboriginal reserve was declared on 17 July 1970 (effective 21 August 1970), and revoked on 20 September 1974. Other reserves and places of Aboriginal significance are at nearby at Terry Hie Hie, and one called Wirajarai on the Gwydir River.

=== 21st century ===
In 2007 the Moree Plains Council announced plans for a $14m upgrade to the hot thermal baths.

== Heritage-listed sites ==
- Commercial Banking Company of Sydney building (former)
- Commonwealth Bank (former)
- Mellor House
- Moree Club
- Moree Courthouse
- Moree Lands Office
- Anne Street: Moree Baths and Swimming Pool
- Moree Spa Baths
- Victoria Hotel Moree

The Steel Bridge Aboriginal Campsite is a site of moderate to high Aboriginal cultural and social significance. 6 km (3.7 mi) outside town, the Gamilaroi Nature Reserve and Terry Hie Hie Reserve are also of cultural and historical significance to Aboriginal people.

== Demographics ==
Historical population
| Year | Pop. | ±% |
|---|---|---|
| 1921 | 3,019 | — |
| 1933 | 4,355 | +44.3% |
| 1947 | 5,106 | +17.2% |
| 1954 | 5,502 | +7.8% |
| 1961 | 6,795 | +23.5% |
| 1966 | 8,094 | +19.1% |
| 1971 | 9,139 | +12.9% |
| 1976 | 9,359 | +2.4% |
| 1981 | 10,459 | +11.8% |
| 1986 | 10,215 | −2.3% |
| 1991 | 10,062 | −1.5% |
| 1996 | 9,270 | −7.9% |
| 2001 | 9,274 | +0.0% |
| 2006 | 8,083 | −12.8% |
| 2011 | 7,720 | −4.5% |
| 2016 | 7,383 | −4.4% |
| 2021 | 7,070 | −4.2% |
Source: Australian Bureau of Statistics data.

In the 2021 Australian census, there were 7,070 people registered in the town. Of these, nearly a quarter identified as Aboriginal and/or Torres Strait Islander. Around 70 per cent of the population were born in Australia.

== Tourism and culture ==
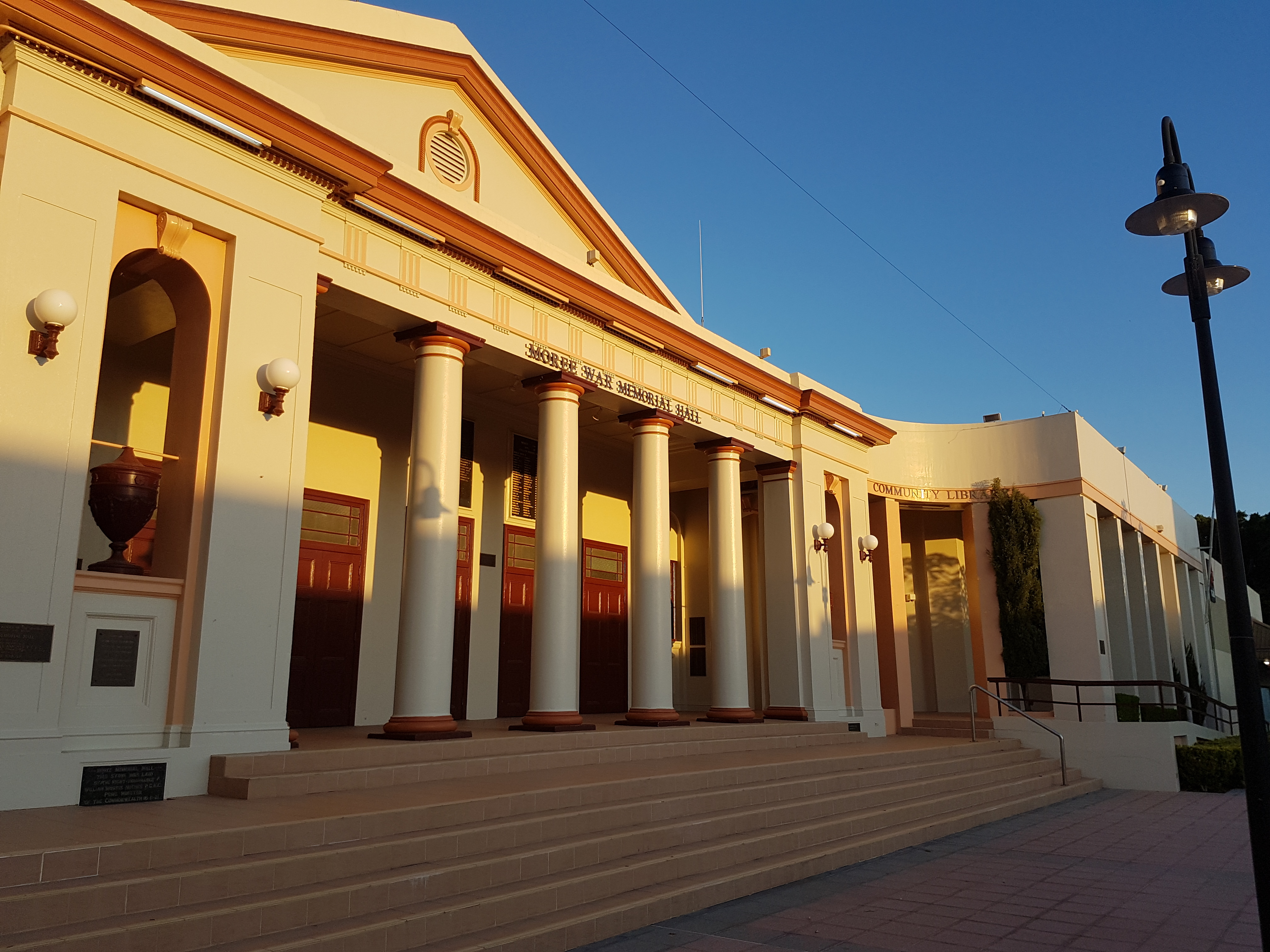
Moree Community Library, Balo St

Moree is home to artesian hot spring baths that are famous for their reputed healing qualities. Long before the arrival of the British colonists, the Aboriginal people made use of the hot springs.

BAMM: Bank Art Museum Moree, until 2018 known as Moree Plains Gallery, holds a significant collection of Aboriginal art. It was established and run by Moree Plains Shire Council until 2018, when the Moree Cultural Art Foundation took over management of the gallery.

It also holds a series of photographs of people from the two Moree missions, called A common place: Portraits of Moree Murries, created in 1990 by Michael Riley, an Indigenous artist. His mother grew up on one of the missions.

== Climate ==
Moree possesses a semi-arid-influenced humid subtropical climate (Köppen: Cfa), with very hot, sometimes humid summers and mild, dry winters with cool nights. Average maxima vary from 34.4 °C (93.9 °F) in January to 18.4 °C (65.1 °F) in July, while average minima from 20.5 °C (68.9 °F) in January to 4.6 °C (40.3 °F) in July. Mean annual rainfall is moderately low at 577.8 mm (22.75 in) and is spread across 52.6 rainy days, peaking in the summer months with severe thunderstorms.

The town is very sunny, experiencing 155.2 clear days with 3,316.8 sun hours annually. Extreme temperatures have ranged from 47.3 °C (117.1 °F) on 3 January 2014 and on 12 February 2017 to −4.3 °C (24.3 °F) on 2 July 2002.

Climate data for Moree Aero (29.49°S 149.85°E, 213 m AMSL) (1995–2024)
| Month | Jan | Feb | Mar | Apr | May | Jun | Jul | Aug | Sep | Oct | Nov | Dec | Year |
|---|---|---|---|---|---|---|---|---|---|---|---|---|---|
| Record high °C (°F) | 47.3 (117.1) | 47.3 (117.1) | 41.3 (106.3) | 35.8 (96.4) | 30.6 (87.1) | 27.1 (80.8) | 27.3 (81.1) | 36.1 (97.0) | 37.8 (100.0) | 40.4 (104.7) | 44.3 (111.7) | 45.9 (114.6) | 47.3 (117.1) |
| Mean daily maximum °C (°F) | 34.4 (93.9) | 33.3 (91.9) | 31.2 (88.2) | 27.3 (81.1) | 22.6 (72.7) | 18.9 (66.0) | 18.4 (65.1) | 20.7 (69.3) | 24.6 (76.3) | 28.2 (82.8) | 30.9 (87.6) | 33.0 (91.4) | 27.0 (80.5) |
| Mean daily minimum °C (°F) | 20.5 (68.9) | 19.7 (67.5) | 17.5 (63.5) | 12.8 (55.0) | 8.3 (46.9) | 5.9 (42.6) | 4.6 (40.3) | 5.5 (41.9) | 9.0 (48.2) | 12.9 (55.2) | 16.4 (61.5) | 18.6 (65.5) | 12.6 (54.8) |
| Record low °C (°F) | 10.8 (51.4) | 9.9 (49.8) | 5.9 (42.6) | 1.2 (34.2) | −1.8 (28.8) | −3.8 (25.2) | −4.3 (24.3) | −3.8 (25.2) | −1.9 (28.6) | 2.6 (36.7) | 5.0 (41.0) | 7.7 (45.9) | −4.3 (24.3) |
| Average precipitation mm (inches) | 77.1 (3.04) | 66.6 (2.62) | 61.8 (2.43) | 23.6 (0.93) | 29.2 (1.15) | 36.8 (1.45) | 33.2 (1.31) | 25.8 (1.02) | 35.1 (1.38) | 50.2 (1.98) | 74.1 (2.92) | 66.4 (2.61) | 577.8 (22.75) |
| Average precipitation days (≥ 1.0 mm) | 5.6 | 5.2 | 4.9 | 2.3 | 3.3 | 3.8 | 3.7 | 2.9 | 3.8 | 5.0 | 5.9 | 6.2 | 52.6 |
| Average afternoon relative humidity (%) | 35 | 37 | 34 | 32 | 38 | 46 | 43 | 35 | 32 | 30 | 32 | 32 | 35 |
| Average dew point °C (°F) | 12.5 (54.5) | 13.3 (55.9) | 10.6 (51.1) | 6.9 (44.4) | 5.4 (41.7) | 5.2 (41.4) | 3.6 (38.5) | 2.3 (36.1) | 3.8 (38.8) | 4.7 (40.5) | 7.8 (46.0) | 9.9 (49.8) | 7.2 (44.9) |
| Mean monthly sunshine hours | 310.0 | 276.9 | 291.4 | 273.0 | 251.1 | 213.0 | 238.7 | 279.0 | 285.0 | 300.7 | 288.0 | 310.0 | 3,316.8 |
| Percentage possible sunshine | 72 | 75 | 77 | 80 | 76 | 69 | 74 | 81 | 80 | 76 | 71 | 71 | 75 |
Source: Bureau of Meteorology

=== Flooding ===
==== 20th century ====
In January 1910 floods in the Moree district caused numerous washouts of the railway to the town. An unknown number of livestock were drowned, and at least four people drowned in the Moree area.

In January 1946 a flood cut the township in two, and damaged several hundred homes. The flood waters affected the local power station and caused a blackout. The floods also damaged roads and railway lines in the region. The Gwydir River bridge at Moree was also damaged.

In February 1955 the highest recorded major flood hit Moree, with a record flood peak of 10.85 metres (35.6 ft). Most of the central business district of the town and 800 homes were flooded.

In February 1971 a major flood affected the town, with a flood peak of 10.35 metres (34.0 ft). Four hundred people were evacuated and the township was isolated for two weeks.

In February 1976, another major flood hit Moree, with a flood peak of 10.60 metres (34.8 ft). Nearly three quarters of the buildings in north Moree either had floodwater surrounding them or water in them. This included the central business district.

==== 21st century ====
In February 2001, another major flood peak was recorded in Moree. There were a few houses with over floor flooding. Before the flood, nearly 250 millimetres or 10 inches fell at Moree Airport within 48 hours.

In November 2011, major flooding affected parts of Moree, with a peak of 10.21 metres (33.5 ft). People were urged to evacuate from parts of north Moree and houses were flooded. Nearly 225 millimetres or 9 inches of rain was recorded over 72 hours with 112 millimetres (4.41 in) falling in the final 24 hours of rainfall. Moree and numerous other shires were declared natural disaster zones.

In February 2012, major flooding again occurred in Moree. Peaking just 10 centimetres (3.9 in) above the February 1976 floods at 10.69 metres (35.1 ft), the water inundated hundreds of houses in and around Moree. the floods were the second highest ever recorded in Moree. Nearly the whole of north Moree had water in the streets.

The whole of north Moree was told to evacuate the day before the flood peak, including the nearby villages of Yarraman, Gwydirfield, Bendygleet, Pallamallawa and Biniguy. Some of the lower parts of south Moree became inundated with flooding. It was expected to be the worst flooding in 35 years. No fatalities were recorded. Nearly 190 millimetres (7.48 in) of rain was recorded at the Moree Meteorological Station in the 72 hours before the flood.

In March 2021, heavy rainfall affected North and East NSW, causing major flooding. On 23 March, Moree received 150 mm (5.9 in), which was the second-wettest day on record for any month since February 1888. Flood levels on the Mehi River reached 14.2 metres or 46.6 feet on 25 of March. (0.4m below the 1955 record of 10.85 metres or 35.6 feet) The total rainfall for March 2021 was 263.4 millimetres or 10.37 inches as against an average of 62.8 millimetres or 2.47 inches

In October 2022, Moree experienced major flooding with the Mehi River peaking at 10.50 m (34.4 ft) Some 4,000 residents had been told to evacuate in advance of the rains. This was part of an event that caused major flood levels state wide.

== Sports ==
The most popular sport in Moree by a wide margin is rugby league. There are two rugby league teams from the town, the Moree Boars of Group 4, and the famous Aboriginal team the Moree Boomerangs of Group 19. The teams play at Boughton Oval and Burt Jovanovich Oval, respectively, often in front of many spectators.

Rugby league teams in Moree

- Moree Boars (Group 4)
- Moree Boomerangs (Group 19)

Other sports teams include the Narrabri Eagles/Moree Suns, who play in AFL North West, and Moree Weebolla Bulls RUFC.

== Media ==
Moree is served by the Moree Champion newspaper, owned by Rural Press. It is published on Tuesdays and Thursdays.

Radio stations that broadcast to Moree are ABC New England North West, and community based stations, 2VM and 98.3 NOW FM which both broadcast from Moree. The NOW FM transmitter site is located on Mt Dowe, whilst the 2VM transmitter is located 5 kilometres east of Moree on the Gwydir Highway. Both stations are owned by the Broadcast Operations Group and broadcast weekday breakfast and afternoon programs.

Moree receives TV from SBS and ABC and the regional stations of Seven, Nine and 10 Northern NSW.

== Transport ==
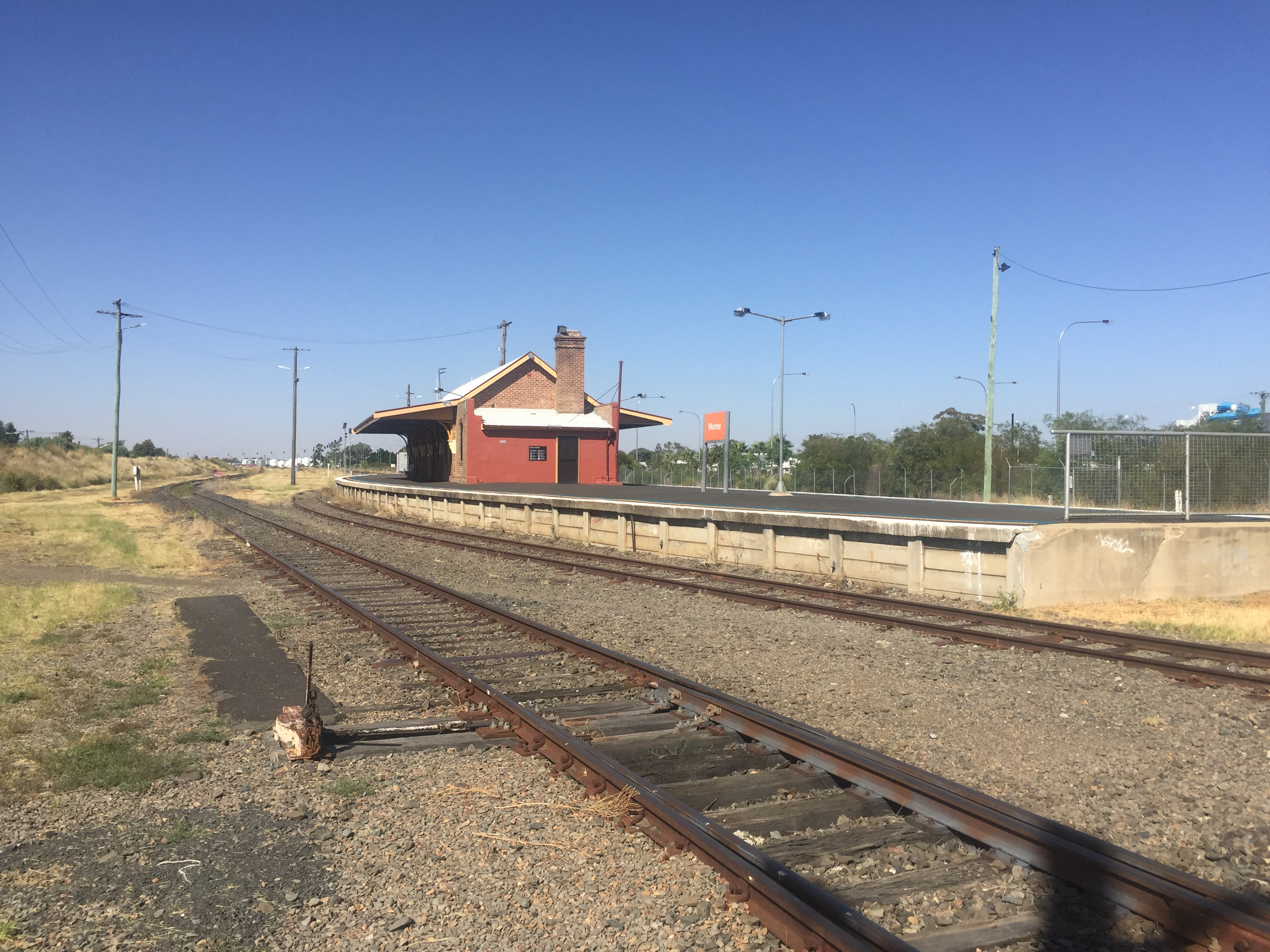
Moree railway station, April 2018.

Moree Airport provides regular services to Sydney which operated by Qantas.

Moree railway station is situated on the Mungindi line, 665 kilometres (413 mi) from Sydney. The station opened in 1897 and marks the northernmost point of passenger services on the line, with daily NSW TrainLink Xplorer DMU services running to and from Sydney.

NSW TrainLink also operate a road coach service from Moree to Grafton. Crisps Coaches operate a coach service from Moree to Warwick with connections to Brisbane and Toowoomba.

== Notable people ==
- Mary Brand (1827–1900), first female shopkeeper and first hotelier in Moree; she is commemorated by Mary Brand Park. It had a replica of her shop and house until these burned down in 2012 She is buried in the Moree Cemetery.
- Edward Bulwer Lytton Dickens (1852–1902), youngest child of English author Charles Dickens; emigrated to Australia and lived in Moree. He was a member of parliament for Wilcannia, and is buried in Moree cemetery
- Gail Garvey, Indigenous Australian epidemiological oncologist; from a Moree family
- Mary Gaudron, first female Justice of the High Court of Australia
- Cameron Hammond, first aboriginal person from Moree to compete in the Commonwealth Games (Delhi 2010). He boxed in the welterweight division In March 2012, he qualified for the 2012 Summer Olympics in London.
- Van Humphries, Australian rugby union player; grew up in Moree
- Ewan McGrady, Australian rugby league player
- Emma Moffatt, triathlete; two-time world champion (2009 and 2010), 3rd at the Beijing Olympic Games 2008, 6th at the 2016 Rio Olympics and competed at the 2012 London Olympics
- Carmine Munro, Aboriginal elder
- Lyall Munro Snr, husband of Carmine, Aboriginal leader
- Lyall Munro Jnr, son of Carmine and Lyall Snr, Aboriginal activist and leader
- Tyrone Munro, Australian rugby league player
- Michael Riley (1960–2004), indigenous artist and filmmaker, whose mother was born in Moree. His series A common place: Portraits of Moree Murries (1990), is held by BAMM
- Matthew Ryan, Australian rugby league player
- David Stove, philosopher and essayist; born in Moree in 1927
- Peter Taylor, retired from the Australian cricket team; now lives in Moree
- Tony Taylor (GC), vulcanologist; one of five Australian civilians directly awarded the George Cross; born in Moree 30 October 1917
- John Williamson, country music singer-songwriter; has strong roots in Moree; his mother and a large part of his extended family still live there
- Mark Wright (1955−2017), professional rugby league player for the Newcastle Jets, born in Moree

== Gallery ==
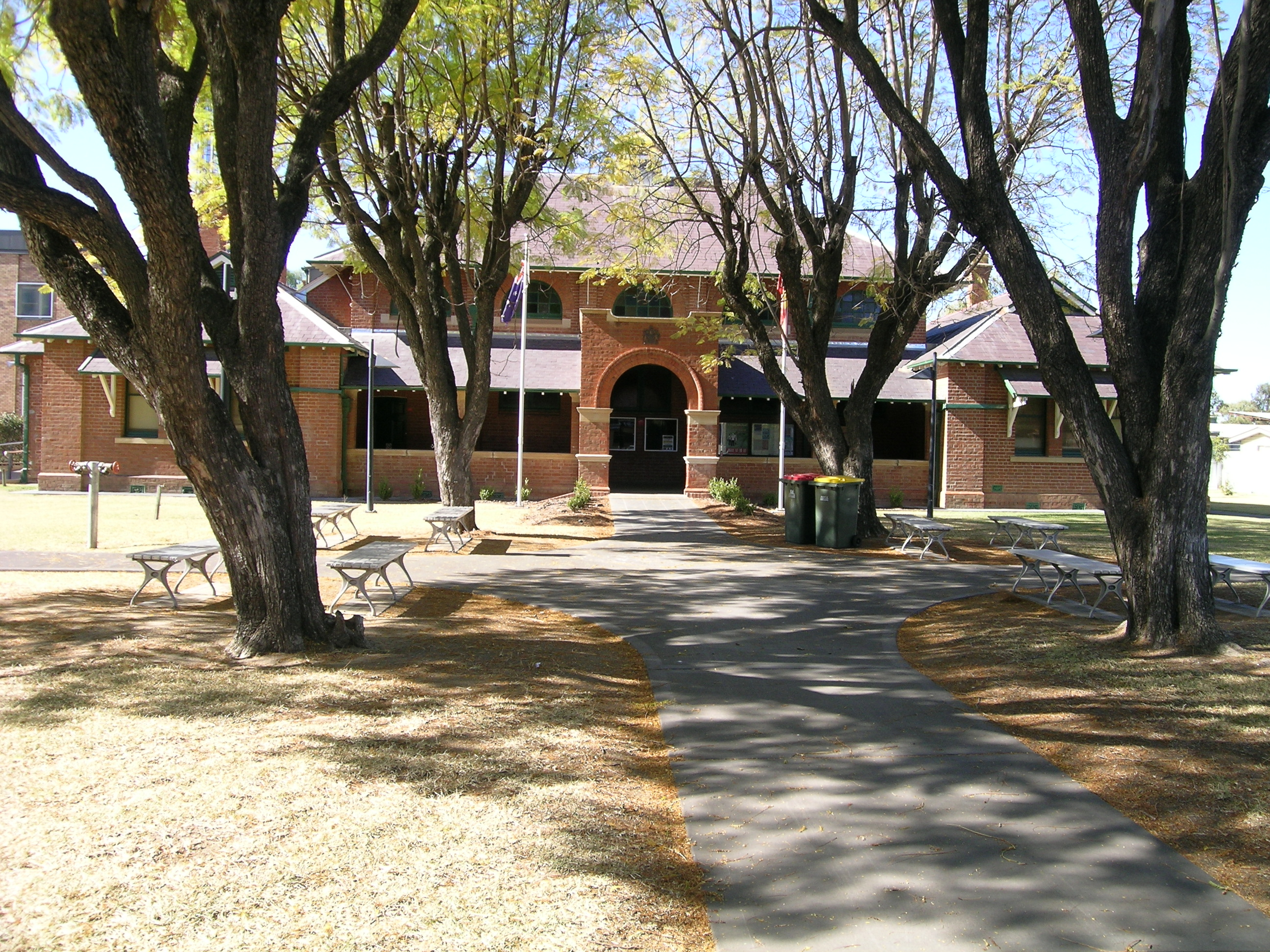
Moree Courthouse on Frome Street

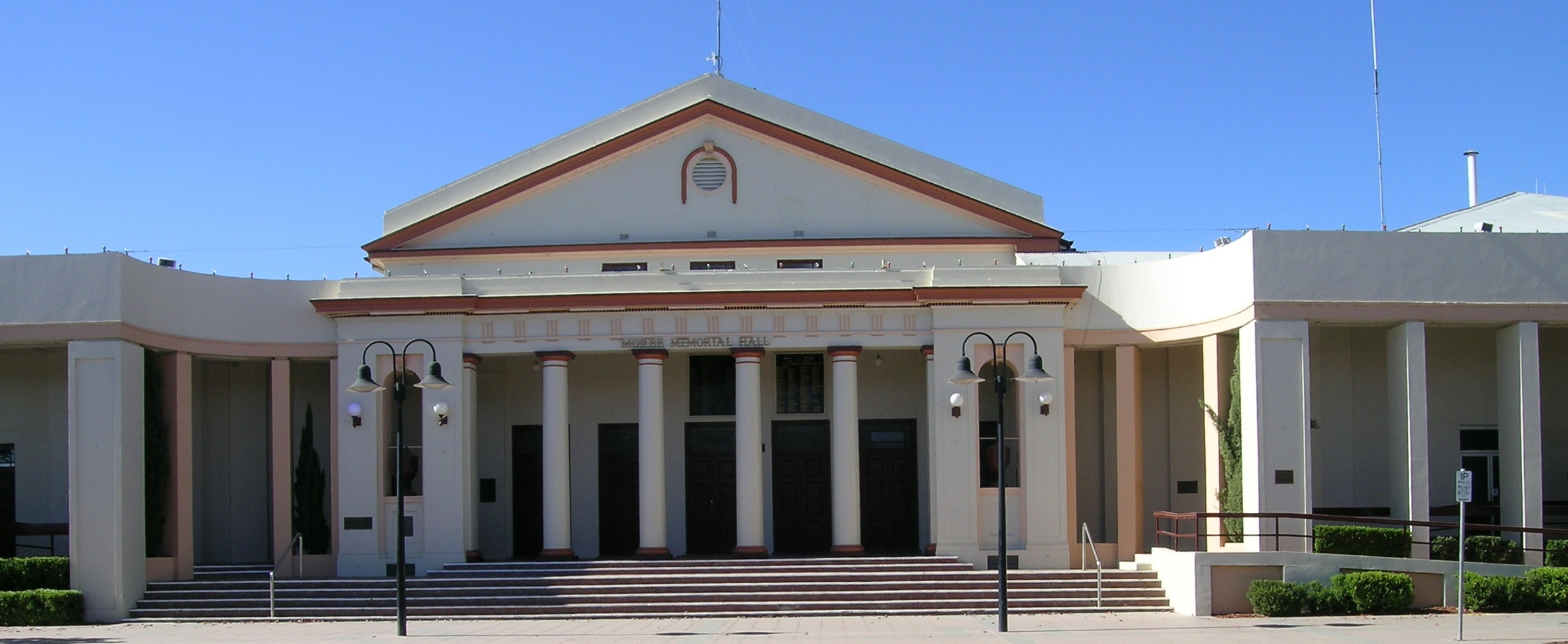
Moree Memorial Hall and Library

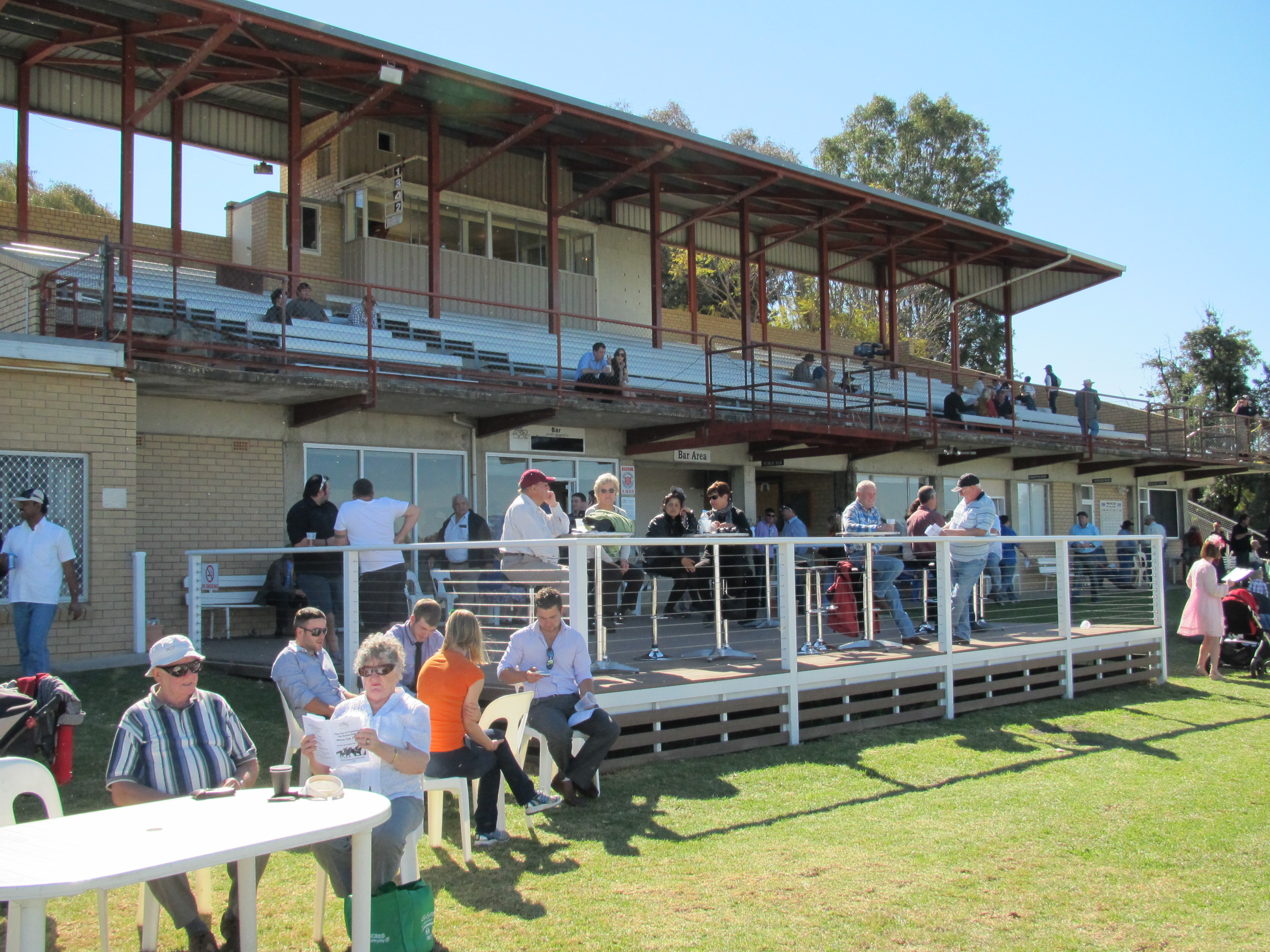
Moree Racecourse

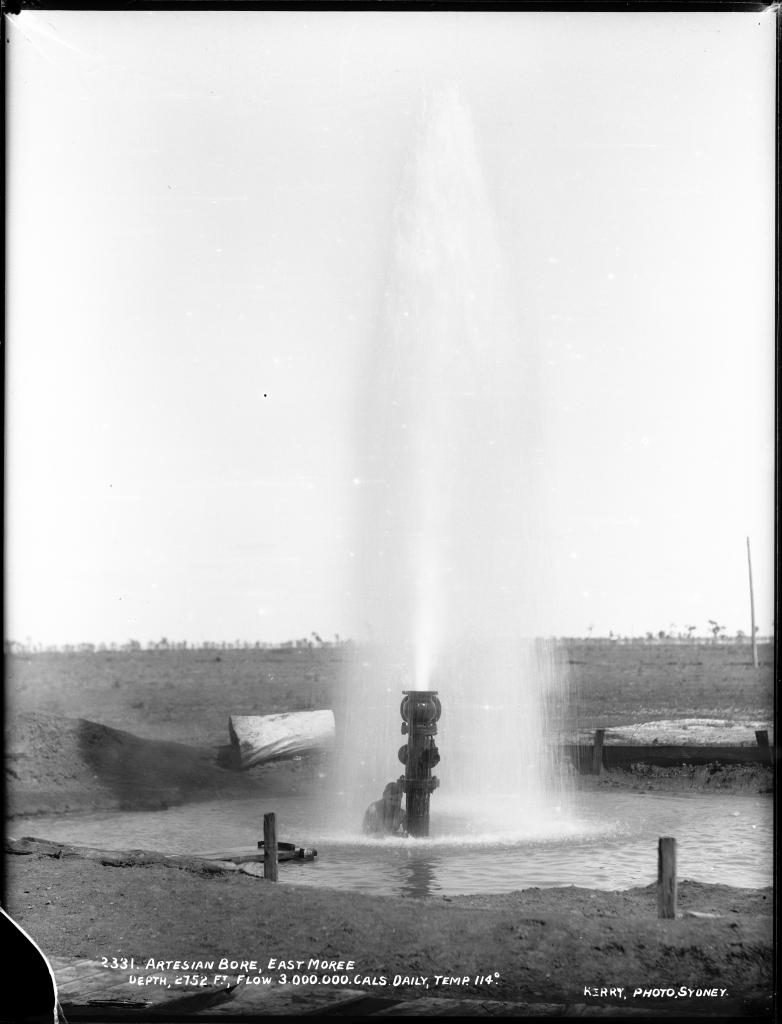
Artesian Bore East Moree (c. 1884–1917)

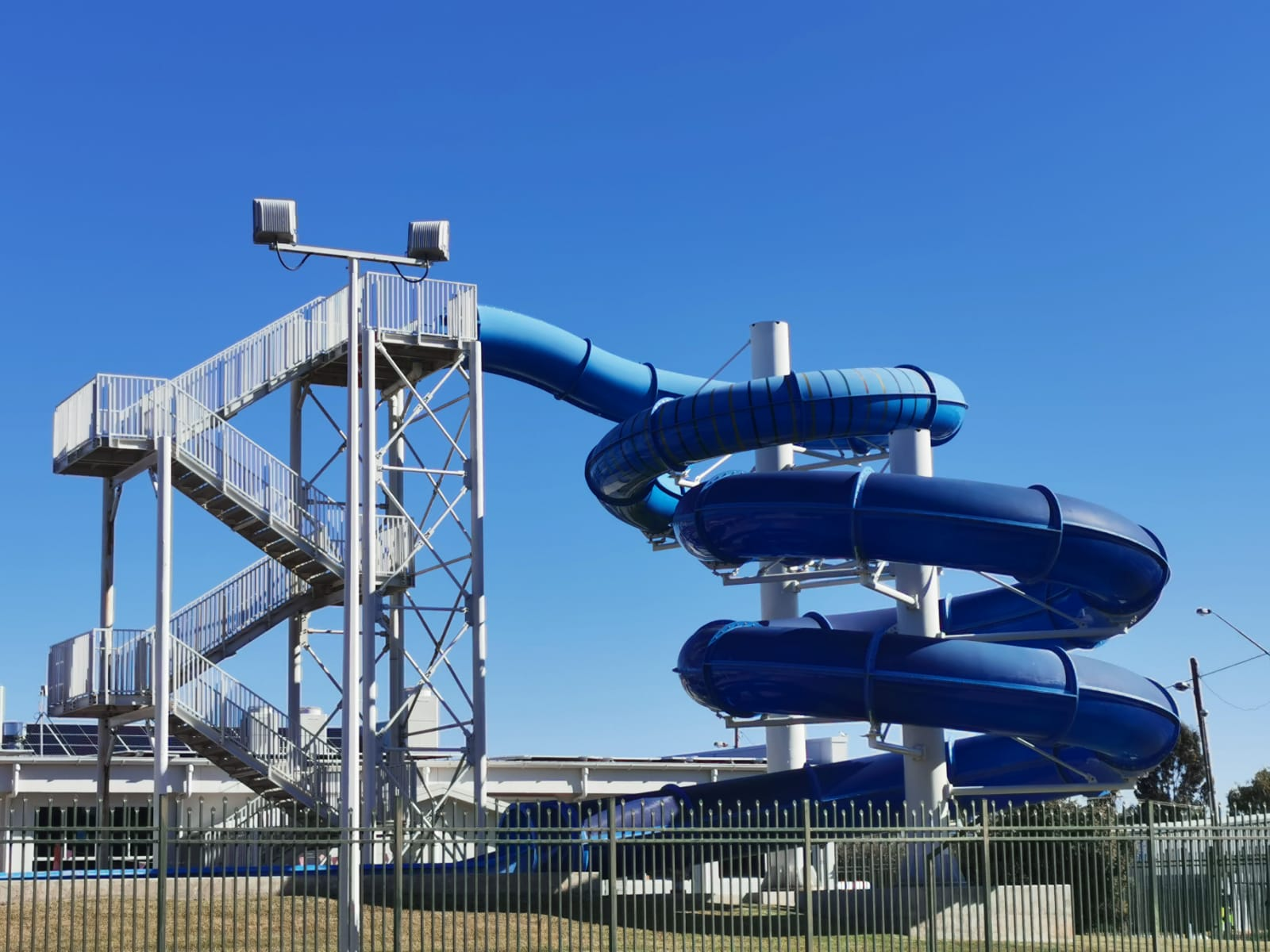
Moree Artesian Aquatic Centre

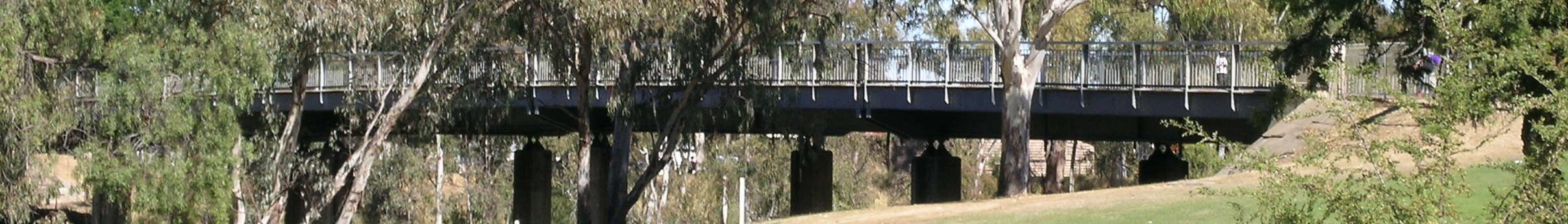
A bridge over Moree
