= George Floyd protests in Australia =

Anti-racism protests in Australia

- Part of George Floyd protests
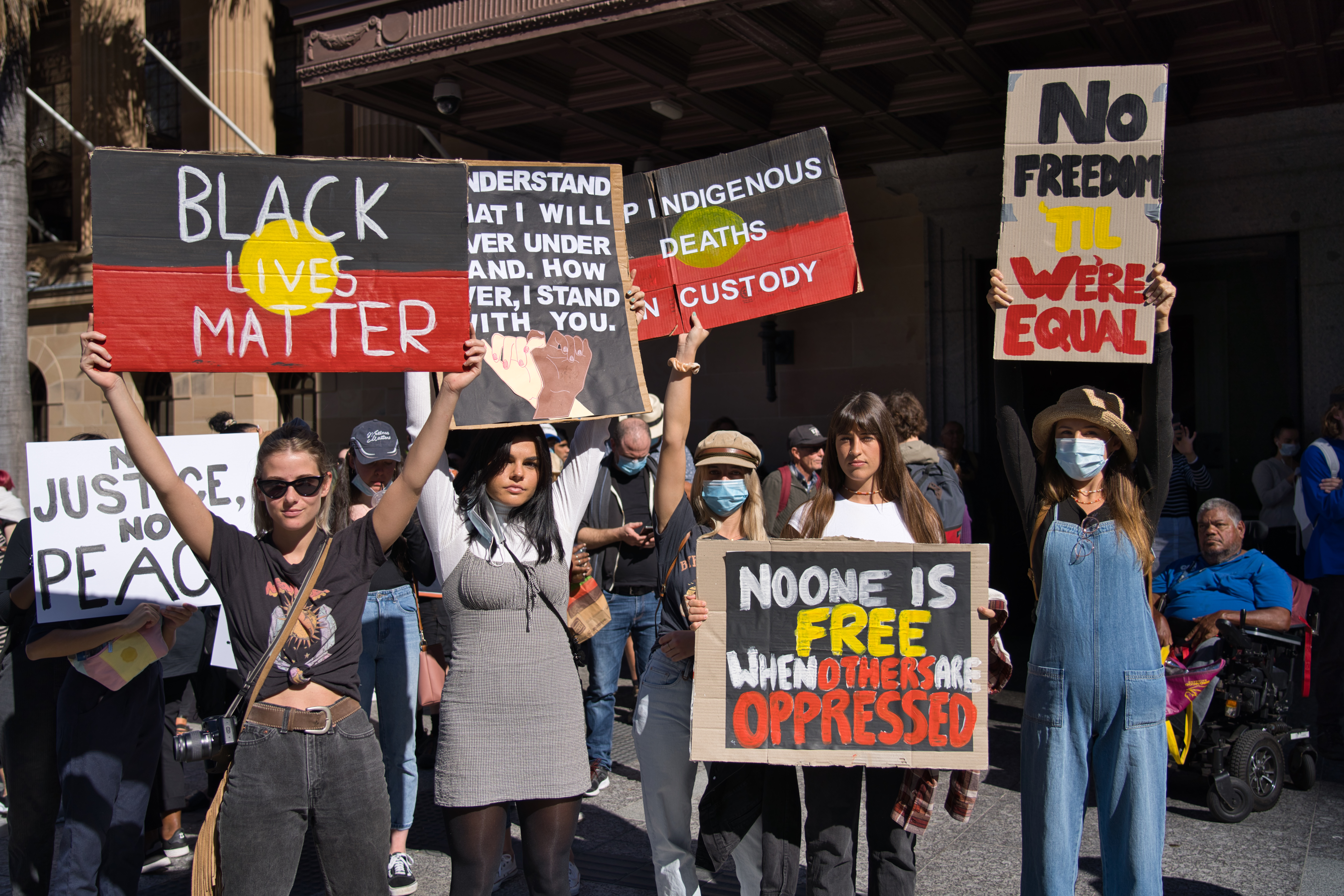
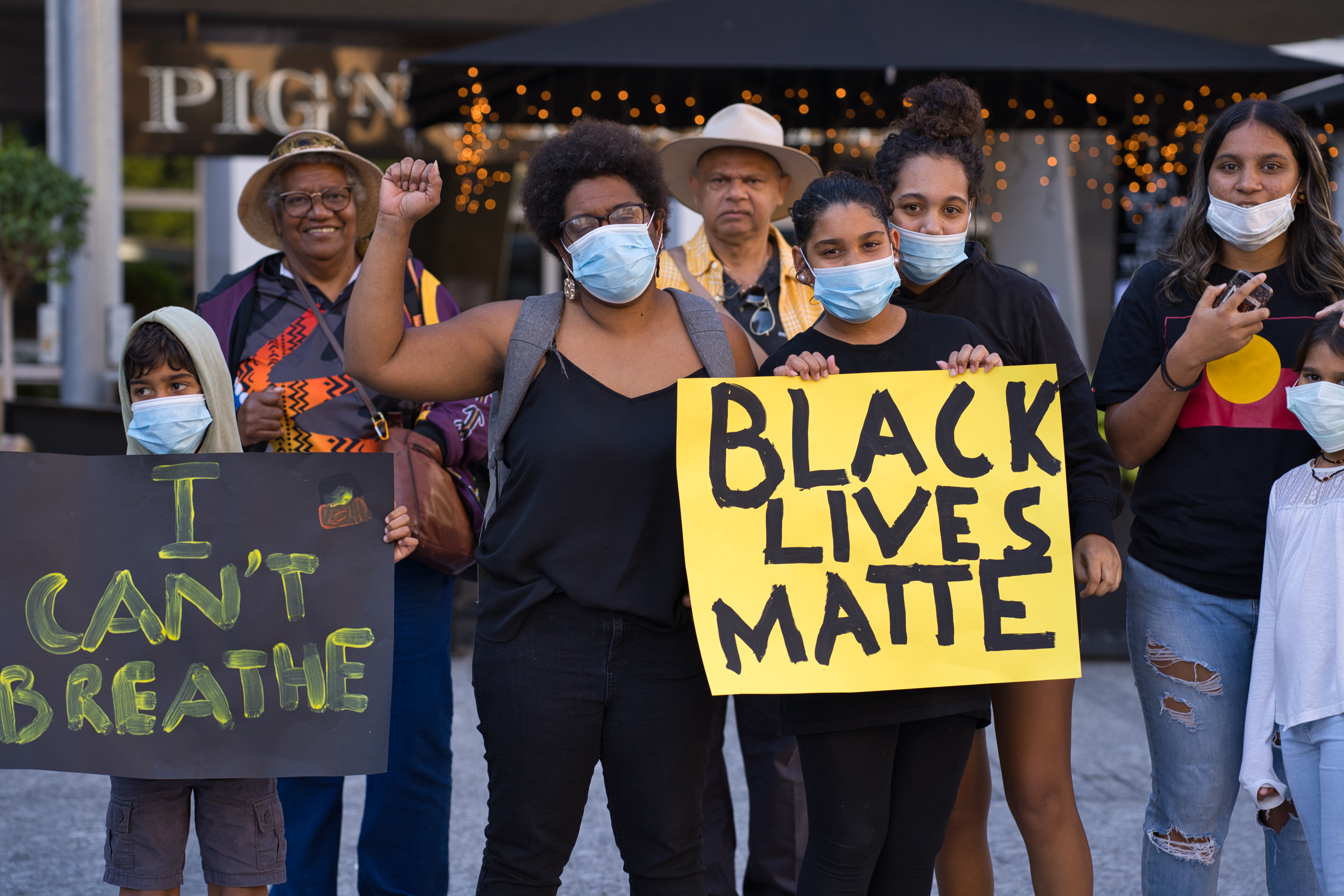
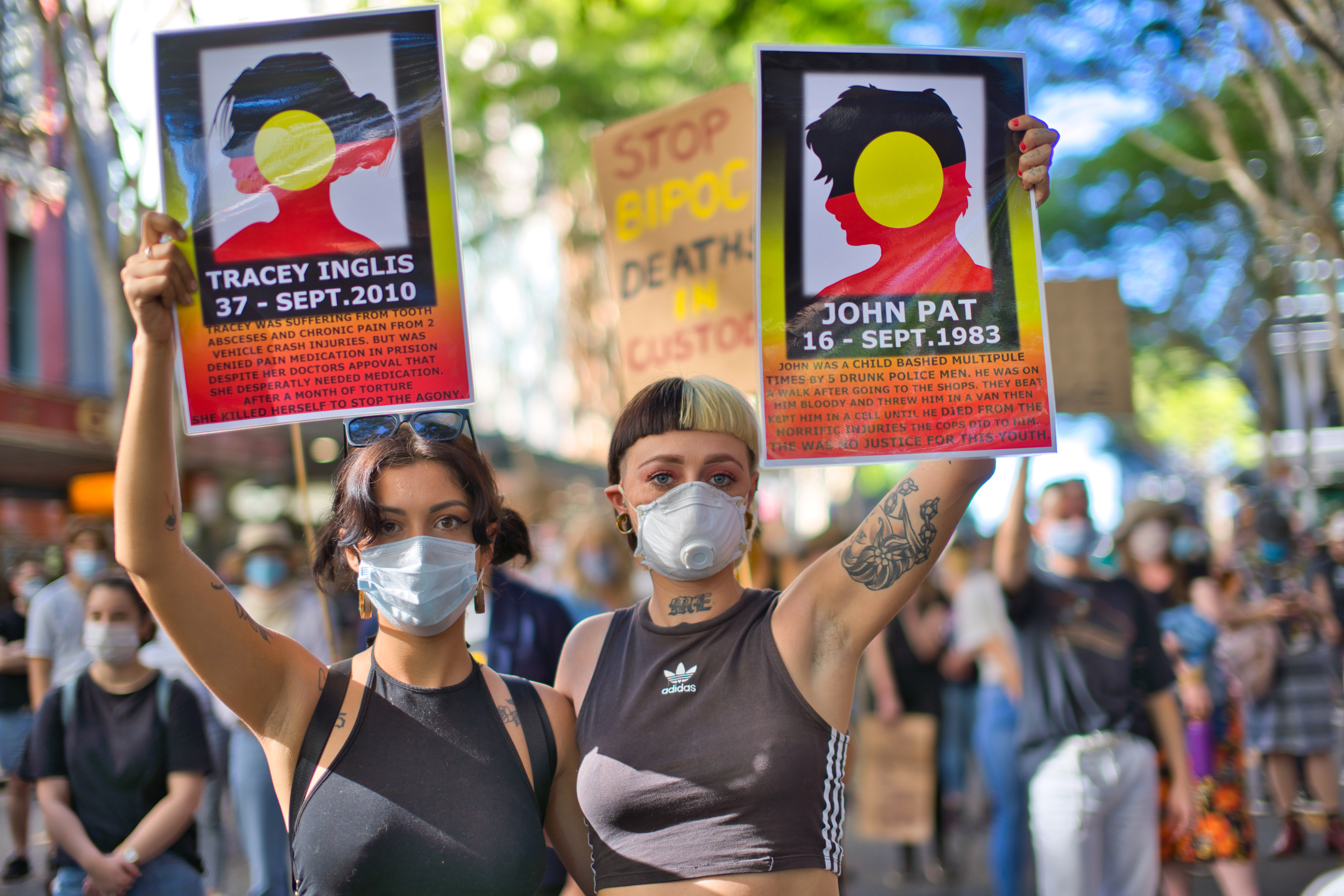
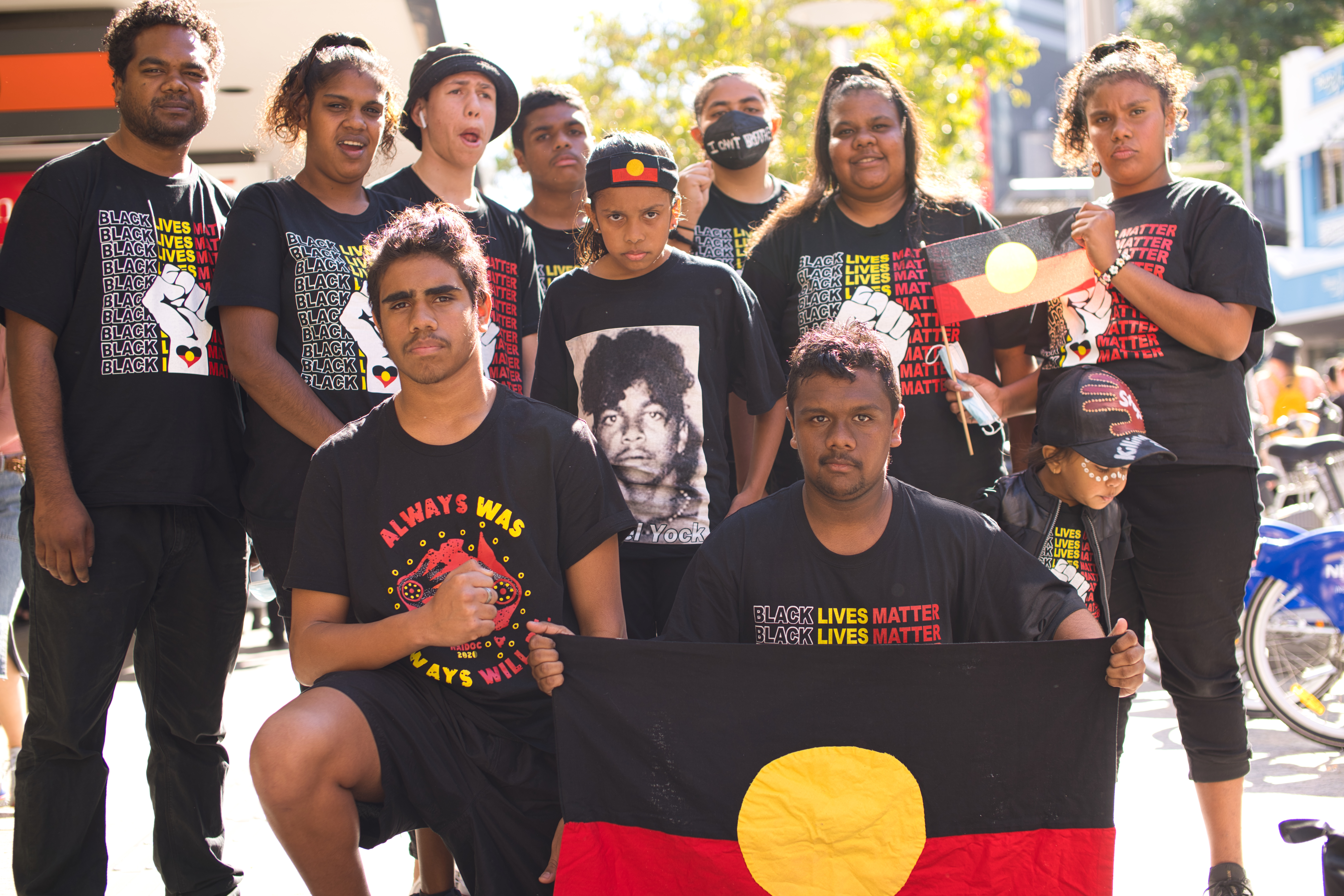
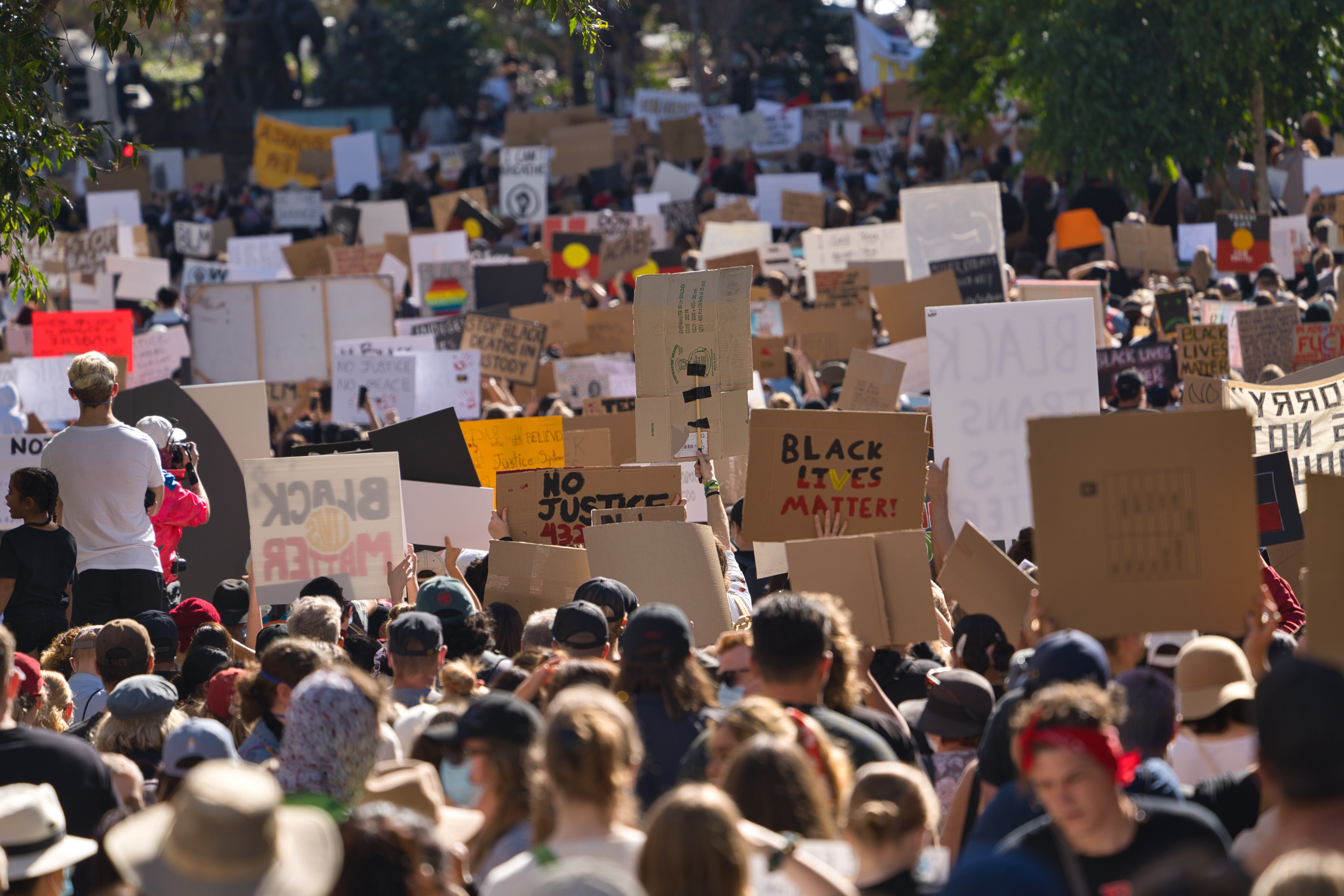
- Montage of Australian anti-racism protests on 6 June 2020. These images are from the Brisbane protest.
- Date: 1–5 June 2020
- Location: Australia
- Caused by: Police brutality; Institutional racism; Racism in Australia; Aboriginal deaths in custody; Reaction to the murder of George Floyd

Cities in Australia in which a protest with about 100 or more participants was held

Shortly after protests began in the United States in late May 2020 seeking justice for George Floyd, an African-American who was murdered during an arrest by Minneapolis police, people in Australia protested to show solidarity with Americans and the Black Lives Matter movement, as well as to demonstrate against issues with police brutality and institutional racism, racism in Australia, and Aboriginal deaths in custody. Vigils and protests of thousands of participants took place nationwide.

== Background ==
The COVID-19 pandemic in Australia began with the first recorded case in January 2020. By March, social-distancing rules were implemented, international borders closed to non-residents, and a series of lockdowns began in some places, responding to outbreaks of the disease.

On 25 May 2020, US police responded to a callout. As a result, George Floyd, an African American man, was arrested for allegedly using counterfeit money. Once restrained, Floyd repeatedly stated "I can't breathe" whilst a white officer knelt on his neck, asphyxiating him. When footage of the event was released, all officers affiliated with the arrest were fired. Floyd's death was ruled a homicide by the coroner, with charges being laid against the officers.

The murder of George Floyd lead to widespread protests in the US, as his murder became a focal point for race relations, institutionalised racism and police brutality. Police brutality in the United States was a longstanding social issue, with activists often protesting against excessive force and high incarceration rates of African Americans.

Aside from solidarity with US protesters, these themes also resonated in Australia, where the media considering similarities with Aboriginal deaths in custody and wider social issues faced by Indigenous Australians. Oppression of Indigenous Australians is a prominent theme in Australian history. Despite encountering Indigenous Australians upon their arrival, members of the First Fleet invoked the principle of terra nullius to claim the continent. This was followed by a long period of recurrent massacres and violent conflicts. By the 20th century, the Australian government adopted a policy of forcibly separating mixed-race Indigenous children from their families, which remained in place until the 1970s.

In 1987, the Royal Commission into Aboriginal Deaths in Custody was appointed to investigate 99 cases of Aboriginal deaths in custody during the 1980s. As of 5 June 2020, an additional 434 Aboriginal Australians had died in custody since the commission's findings were handed down in 1991. As of 2016, while Indigenous Australians accounted for roughly 2% of Australia's total population, they made up 27% of the national prison population, with incarceration rates rising markedly in the preceding decade.

The George Floyd protests in Australia often referenced recent instances of Aboriginal deaths in custody. These include: the 2014 death of Ms Dhu in police custody; the 2015 death of David Dungay (whose final words were "I can't breathe") in a prison hospital; the 2017 death of Tanya Day in a police cell; and the forceful arrest of an Aboriginal teenager on 1 June 2020.

Many Indigenous people were frustrated that it took the murder of a black man in the US to bring focus onto injustices in Australia.

== Reactions ==
Prime Minister Scott Morrison stated his beliefs that violent protests would not create change. He warned against Australian demonstrations taking a similar course as "there's no need to import things happening in other countries." Following major Australia-wide protests on 6 June, Morrison called them "completely unacceptable" and demanded an end to further protests. In addition to concerns around COVID-19, he stated that some protests had been hijacked by left-wing movements, and called for demonstrators at future events to be charged. However, after being challenged on his assertion that there had not been slavery in Australia, Morrison acknowledged that "all sorts of hideous practices" had taken place in the past.

The Labor Party did not directly criticise people protesting, but said that everyone should follow the authorities’ health advice. Senior Indigenous MP Linda Burney said that it was important for the media to focus on the issues, not whether people protested or not.

== Demonstrations ==
=== Australian Capital Territory ===
- Canberra: 2,000 protesters in the capital city marched to Parliament House on Friday 5 June.

=== New South Wales ===
Protests occurred across the state, Australia's largest, to show solidarity with American protesters and to highlight the high rate of death among incarcerated Indigenous Australians. The protests were preempted by an incident wherein a 16-year-old Indigenous boy was kicked and pinned to the ground by a New South Wales Police Force officer in Surry Hills.

Protests in this state were in violation of the state's Public Health (COVID-19 Restrictions on Gathering and Movement) Order at the time, which banned gatherings of more than ten people outdoors for a common purpose without a reasonable excuse or exemption.

==== Sydney ====
Three major protests were held in Sydney. The first was held on Tuesday 2 June, where 3,000 protesters peacefully marched from Hyde Park to Parliament and Martin Place.

The second and largest protest was held on Saturday 6 June, where at least 10,000 protesters gathered at Sydney Town Hall and marched to Belmore Park. The crowd chanted "I can't breathe" and held a moment of silence for George Floyd. A counter-protester, who interrupted the protest by holding up an "All Lives Matter" sign, was handcuffed and removed from the protest by police. A group of protesters was pepper-sprayed by police at Central Station following the protest, and Acting Police Commissioner Mal Lanyon later defended this action as an appropriate use of force.

The protest caused significant controversy. Premier Gladys Berejiklian originally stated that she believed people had a right to protest, but later backflipped and deemed the protest "illegal" and in violation of the state's public health orders. Following this, the protest was subject to a successful legal challenge in the Supreme Court from the Commissioner of the New South Wales Police Force on the basis of health reasons. That decision was overturned on appeal by the New South Wales Court of Appeal just minutes before the protest began. The Court of Appeal – constituted of Chief Justice Bathurst, President Bell and Justice Leeming – overturned the decision of Justice Fagan on the basis that the protest organisers had complied with the necessary steps in order to gain approval to hold the protest in an authorised way.

A third protest was held on the evening of 12 June in solidarity with protesters at Sydney's Long Bay Correctional Centre, where Corrective Services officers fired tear gas on inmates who spelled out "BLM" on the prison yard. Approximately 300 protesters met in Hyde Park because of a significant police presence at Sydney Town Hall, the original location for the protest. 600 police were involved in policing the gathering, and one woman was arrested for failing to comply with a move on order. Mounted police and officers guarded a large statue of James Cook located in Hyde Park on the night, which was later defaced. A police officer was filmed making an OK gesture toward protesters, a gesture which has been co-opted by the white power movement. The Police Force denied that the officer used the gesture in an offensive way.

==== Rest of New South Wales ====
- Byron Bay: 5,000 gathered at Apex Park and knelt for 8 minutes and 45 seconds in memory of George Floyd on 6 June.
- Coffs Harbour: A protest on 6 June attracted hundreds.
- Katoomba: 200 protesters gathered at the council seat of the Blue Mountains on 6 June and held a smoking ceremony.
- Lismore: 1000 protesters marched from Spinks Park to the Lismore police station on 6 June.
- Newcastle: An estimated 5,000 protesters gathered in Pacific Park and marched through the city to Civic Park. The protest, held on Saturday 6 June, was one of the largest rallies the city has ever seen.
- Wyong: An estimated 500 protesters marched through the town's central business district to the Wyong Court House.
- Protests were also held in Port Macquarie, Wagga Wagga (led by Aunty Isabel Reid) and Wollongong.

=== Northern Territory ===
- Alice Springs: 500 protesters gathered at the town's courthouse.
- Darwin: 1000 protesters gathered at Civic Park and marched through the central business district on 14 June, in a protest organised by members of the Larrakia people, who are the traditional owners of the Darwin area. The protest was granted an exemption from the Territory's coronavirus health orders, which restrict outdoor gatherings of more than 500 people.

=== Queensland ===
- Brisbane: An estimated 35,000 protesters gathered in King George Square in Brisbane's central business district on Saturday 6 June. Earlier, on 3 June, a candlelight vigil was held in Musgrave Park attended by 40 to 50 people. They lighted 432 candles to represent 432 known Aboriginal deaths in custody, and a 433rd candle for Floyd.
- Townsville: 1000 protesters rallied at The Strand.
- Cairns: 3000 protesters protested at Fogarty Park on Sunday 7 June.

=== South Australia ===
- Adelaide: At least 6,000 protesters gathered in Victoria Square on Saturday 6 June and marched along King William Street after the South Australia Police Commissioner gave protesters an exemption from lockdown restrictions. A second protest had been planned for the following Saturday, but police disallowed this. The protest was titled "Solidarity with Minneapolis" by the organisers, and speakers included several African Australian and Aboriginal speakers, who mostly focussed on Australia's history of violence and racism and towards black people. Among those who addressed the crowd were actor Natasha Wanganeen; Kaurna culture and language educator and 2011 SA Young Australian of the Year, Jack Buckskin; South Sudanese musician Gabriel Akon (known as DyspOra); several elders, including 76-year-old Kaurna and Narungga elder Yvonne Agius and Aunty Joan Lemont; and also relatives of deceased victims.

=== Tasmania ===
- Hobart: About 3000 people gathered on the lawns in front of Parliament House in solidarity with the international George Floyd protests. Hand sanitiser and masks were made available, and entry to the lawns was restricted at times to keep the crowd at an acceptable size.
- Launceston: About 300 (Note: An additional 100 people or so were viewing a livestream of the event.) people peacefully protested at a vigil in Prince's Square against racism and police brutality against minorities. Protesters stood for 8′46″ of silence. Speakers also covered issues Aboriginal Tasmanians face, such as Indigenous children being strip searched by police. The vigil had been approved by the local health authorities, and hand sanitiser and masks were made available.

=== Victoria ===
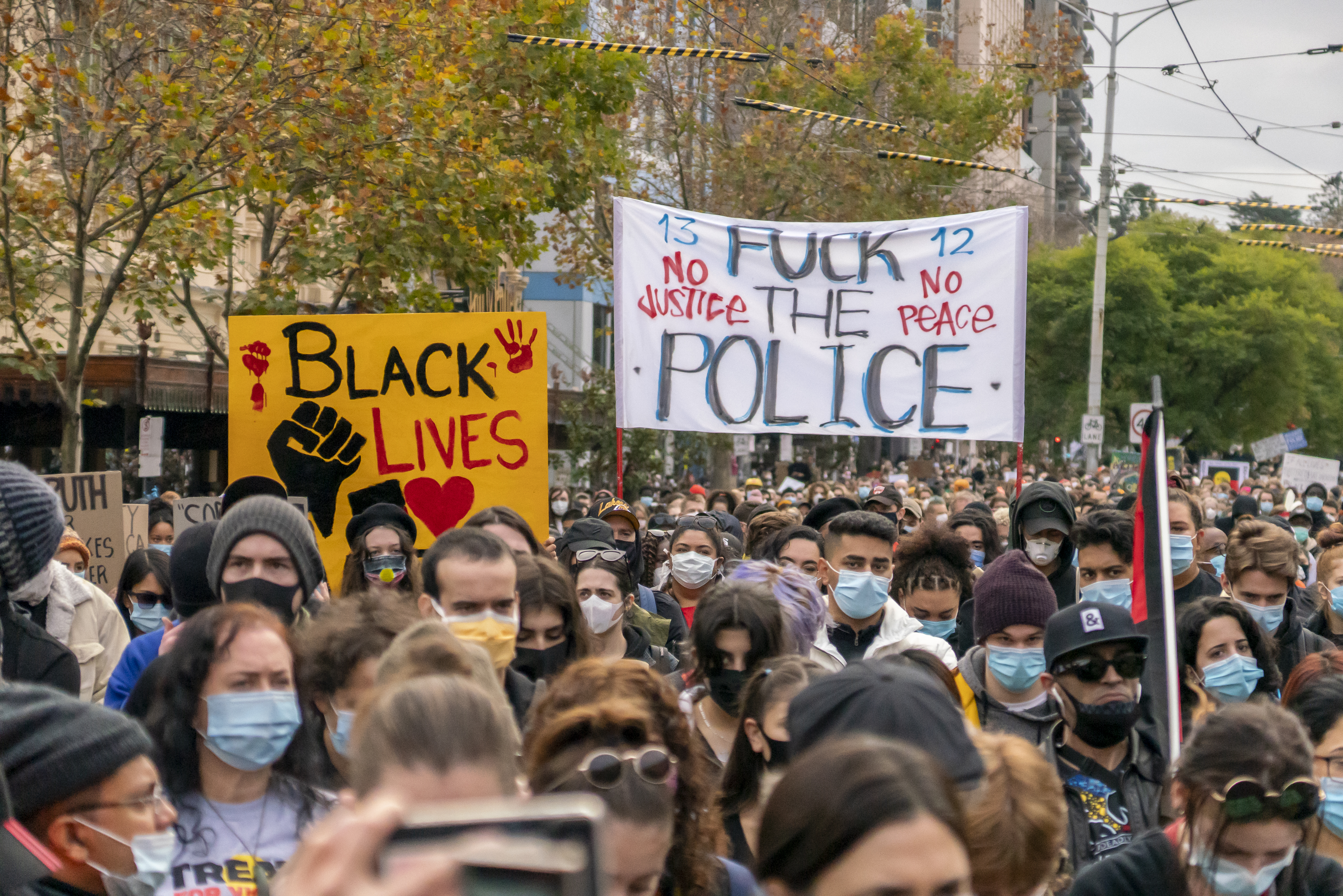
Protest in Melbourne on 6 June 2020

- Ballarat: An estimated 350 protesters gathered at Alfred Deakin Place for a Smoking ceremony and silent protest.
- Melbourne: An estimated 7,000 protesters gathered at Parliament House and marched to Flinders Street railway station on Saturday 6 June 2020. The organisers of the protest, the Warriors of the Aboriginal Resistance, were each fined A$1651 for organising a mass gathering in violation of the Victorian Chief Health Officer's coronavirus directives, which prohibited outdoor gatherings of more than 20 people. Several days later, Victoria's Chief Health Officer revealed that one of the protesters had since been confirmed as COVID positive, though suggested they would have likely contracted COVID-19 before the protest (and may have been asymptomatic during it)

=== Western Australia ===
- Perth: Up to 2,000 protesters rallied at Forrest Place in the central business district (CBD) on 1 June 2020. (Note: Sources vary in describing the attendance, from hundreds to thousands, with The West Australian reporting "hundreds", SBS reporting "[a]bout 2000", and The Age reporting "thousands".) Up to 10,000 protesters rallied at Langley Park and marched through the central business district (CBD) on 13 June, which was the largest protest in the nation.
