= Death of John Pat =

1983 death in police custody in Australia

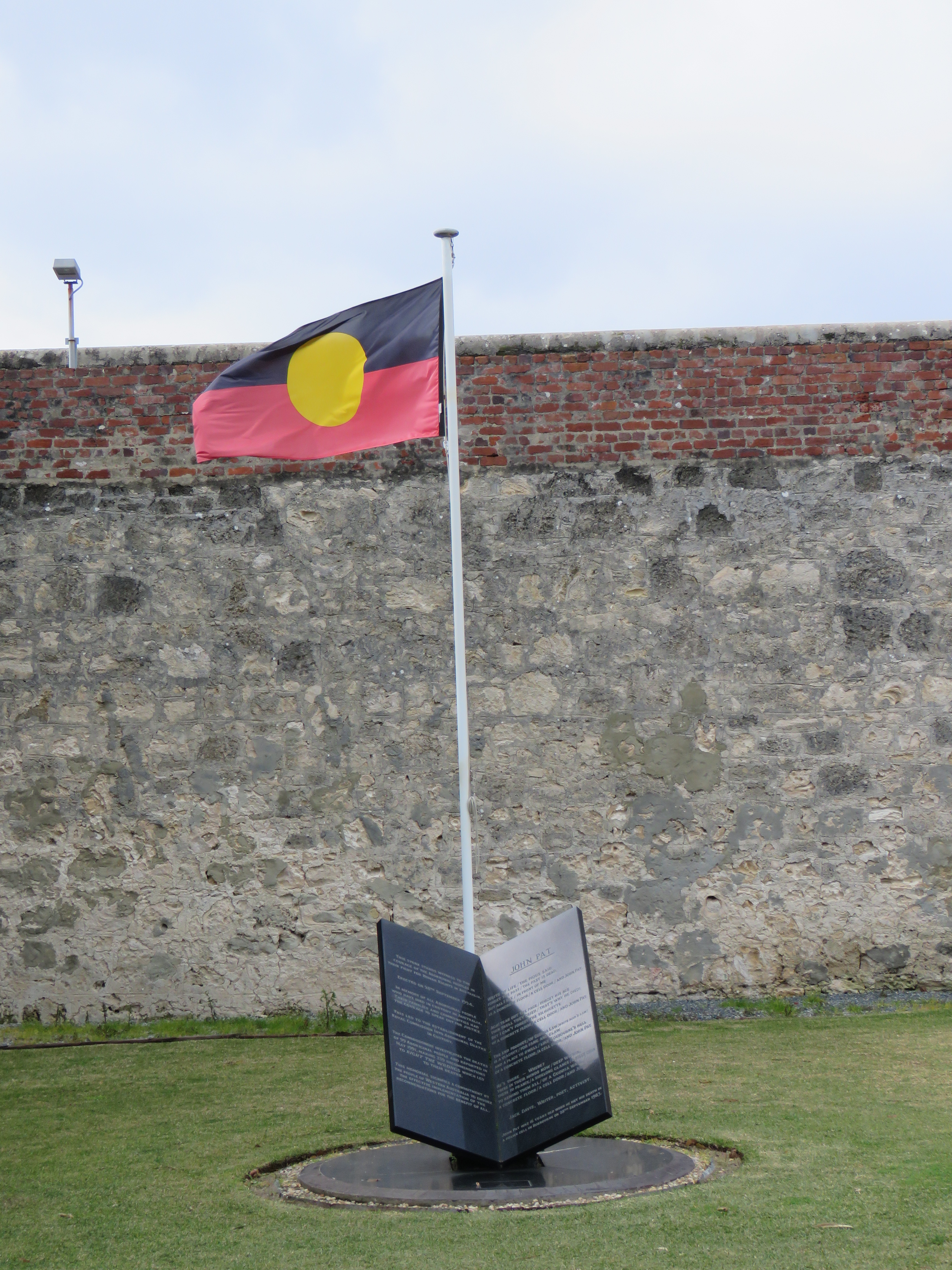
Memorial to John Pat at Fremantle Prison

John Peter Pat (31 October 1966 – 28 September 1983) was an Aboriginal Australian boy who, at the age of 16, died while in the custody of Western Australia Police.

On 28 September 1983, four off-duty police officers and an Aboriginal police aide returned to Roebourne from a police union meeting at Karratha, where they had each consumed six or seven glasses of beer at the Karratha Golf Club. Upon their return to Roebourne, they called in at the Victoria Hotel. A local Aboriginal man, Ashley James, states he was threatened by one of the police officers when he sought to make a purchase at the hotel's bottle shop. A hotel barmaid later testified that police swore at James and threatened to get him when he left the hotel. James later testified that one of the police subsequently accosted him outside on the footpath, and told him to "get fucked". James said that he fought back, and was then attacked by the other officers. A general melée ensued, with Aboriginal men and police trading punches. John Pat joined the fray, and, according to witnesses, was struck in the face by a policeman and fell backward, striking his head on the roadway. According to witnesses, one of the police officers kicked Pat in the head. Pat was then allegedly dragged to a waiting police van, kicked in the face, and thrown in.

Observers across the street from the police station alleged that the Aboriginal men were systematically beaten as they were taken from the police van. One after another, the prisoners were dragged from the van and dropped on the cement pathway. Each was picked up, punched to the ground, and kicked. According to one observer, none of the prisoners fought back or resisted. A little over an hour later, when police sought to check on Pat, he was dead.

A subsequent autopsy revealed a fractured skull, haemorrhage and swelling, as well as bruising and tearing of the brain. Pat had sustained a number of massive blows to the head. One bruise at the back of his head was the size of the palm of a hand, and many other bruises were visible on his head. In addition to the head injuries, he had two broken ribs and a torn aorta, the major blood vessel leading from the heart. The autopsy also showed that the dead youth had had a blood alcohol reading of 0.222%.

The officers were acquitted of manslaughter charges in May 1984 after pleading self-defence. A Royal Commissioner in 1991 acknowledged that "The death of John Pat became for Aboriginal people nation wide a symbol of injustice and oppression... a continuing sense of injustice in the Aboriginal communities throughout Australia saw the anniversary of John Pat's death marked by demonstrations calling for justice".

== Early life ==
Pat was born on 31 October 1966 in Roebourne, Western Australia. He was the eldest of three children born to Mavis Pat (aged 16 years at marriage) and Len Walley (about 36 at marriage), who were married under traditional Aboriginal law. His extended family were Yindjibarndi people with strong ties to traditional culture.

Pat spent his early years living with his family on Mount Florence Station near the Fortescue River. His mother later began a relationship with Mick Lee and the family moved back to Roebourne where they lived at the Aboriginal reserve. The reserve was forcibly closed in 1975 and its residents moved into State Housing Commission properties. Pat attended the local high school for two years then worked briefly as a station hand but was mostly unemployed thereafter. He had convictions for assaulting police, disorderly conduct and drinking as a juvenile on licensed premises.

== Arrest and death ==
On 28 September 1983, four off-duty police officers and an Aboriginal police aide engaged in a fight with Aboriginal man Ashley James people outside the Roebourne Hotel. Pat, who along with other young Aboriginal men joined in the fight, was injured, striking his head on the road and being kicked in the head and face. He was arrested and taken to the lockup, where he died soon after of "closed head injuries" in the juvenile police cell. Subsequent medical evidence indicated that "the fatal injury is likely to have been caused by the contrecoup of the back of the head hitting a flat surface..." The separate impacts of punches and kicks were later also discounted by Royal Commissioner Elliott Johnston, QC.

== Inquest ==
A coronial inquest was conducted on 30 October 1983 at which five police officers declined to give evidence. The coroner, Mr McCann, committed the five officers for trial in the Supreme Court on a charge of unlawful killing.

== Trial ==
The five police officers were tried on counts of manslaughter in the Supreme Court in Karratha in May 1984 before a judge and an all-white jury. The trial lasted for just over three weeks with the jury acquitting each officer by a unanimous verdict.

== Aftermath ==
The Police Commissioner monitored the trial, instructing the attendance of a senior officer, Brian Bull, to "independently review" the proceedings. Mr Bull was of the view that none of the officers had done anything wrong except "falsely noting the Occurrence Book". The five officers were immediately reinstated to duty and no further charges were considered against them—which was described by the Royal Commissioner as "a most unsatisfactory state of affairs".

There was evidence tending to establish that assaults had taken place at the station; the officers, or some of them, were clearly suspected by their superior officer of having been involved in assaulting prisoners. Yet they were reinstated to duty without further investigation and no doubt under the impression (as would all their colleagues be) that they had nothing to account for. I accept Counsel Assisting's submission that this had the potential for undermining the integrity of the police force and the confidence which members of the public are entitled to have in the police force. It seems important to me that the police force has a procedure in place to cope with that sort of situation.

The Police Union succeeded in obtaining government reimbursement of $136,000 costs in representing its members at the inquest and trial. It also campaigned successfully against legislation to give the state's ombudsman increased powers to investigate police misconduct allegations, and sought to weaken or abolish the Aboriginal Legal Service.

The not-guilty verdict has always been bitterly disputed by the Aboriginal community and human-rights advocates, and Pat's death is commemorated annually in parts of Australia. A public monument was established at Fremantle Prison, featuring a poem by Jack Davis that includes the words:

Write of life / the pious said

forget the past / the past is dead.
But all I see / in front of me

is a concrete floor / a cell door / and John Pat.

== See also ==
- Royal Commission into Aboriginal Deaths in Custody
