= Fogliani =

Fogliani is a surname. Notable people with the surname include:

- Antonino Fogliani (1976–2026), Italian conductor
- Ros Fogliani, Australian lawyer and coroner
