= Death of Ms Dhu =

Australian Aboriginal woman

- Photograph of Ms Dhu, widely circulated by mainstream media
- Date: 4 August 2014
- Location: South Hedland police station, Western Australia
- Type: Death in police custody
- Cause: Sepsis and pneumonia from an infection in a broken rib
- Coroner: Rosalinda Fogliani

Julieka Ivanna Dhu (commonly referred to as Ms Dhu (Note: Dhu's first name was generally not used in media reports out of respect for Aboriginal naming customs; however, her family gave permission for use of her full name to increase publicity for her case.)) was a 22-year-old Aboriginal Australian woman who died in police custody in South Hedland, Western Australia, in 2014. On 2 August that year, police responded to a report that Dhu's partner had violated an apprehended violence order. Upon arriving at their address, the officers arrested both Dhu and her partner after realising there was also an outstanding arrest warrant for unpaid fines against Dhu. She was detained in police custody in South Hedland and was ordered to serve four days in custody in default of her debt.

While in custody, Dhu complained of pain and was twice taken to the Hedland Health Campus hospital. Medical staff judged that her complaints were exaggerated and associated with drug withdrawal. On 4 August, Dhu complained that she could no longer stand. Police officers, who accused her of faking her condition, handcuffed her, carried her to the back of their van and returned her to the hospital; she was pronounced dead shortly after arrival. The official cause of death was an infection due to her partner's breaking of her ribs three months earlier.

An internal police investigation found that 11 officers had failed to comply with regulations or were otherwise guilty of misconduct. They were given written and oral warnings. A coronial inquest found that she had suffered "unprofessional and inhumane" handling by police and "deficient" treatment from hospital staff. It also established that police and hospital staff had been influenced by preconceived ideas about Aboriginal people. The inquest recommended that the justice system should stop imprisoning people for unpaid fines and introduce a Custody Notification Scheme (CNS). After years of delays, a CNS was made operational in October 2019. Attorney-General of Western Australia John Quigley introduced legislative amendments to cease jailing people for unpaid fines in September 2019, which were implemented in June 2020.

== Background ==
=== Ms Dhu ===
Julieka Ivanna Dhu was born on 26 December 1991 in Port Hedland, Western Australia (WA). She was Aboriginal and of the Yamatji people. She lived with her parents until they separated when she was three, after which she was mostly raised by her grandmother in Geraldton, though her parents remained in regular contact with her. She was described as a "cheerful" child whose only health issue was mild asthma. Dhu completed Year Eleven; according to her family, after leaving school, she seemed to associate "with a bad crowd" and was a "wild child".

In November 2009, when she was 17, police found Dhu sleeping near Cable Beach; when they woke her she appeared to be intoxicated, swore at them and said "I don't remember anything after taking that eccy". Police arrested her for disorderly conduct and failing to give her name and address, and she was detained in police custody overnight. She was released on bail the next day but failed to appear at her hearing at the Children's Court and was fined A$200. The following year, Dhu was involved in two more minor incidents involving police after she moved back to Port Hedland. On one of the occasions, she kicked a female police officer while being arrested for disorderly conduct and was later also charged with obstructing and assaulting police. Dhu was again fined by the courts.

In 2013, at age 21, Dhu began a relationship with a 42-year-old man, Dion Ruffin, who had several children by previous partners and—unknown to Dhu—had criminal convictions for domestic violence. By late December that year, Dhu's mother said her daughter had become withdrawn and had lost weight. Dhu told her mother that she and Ruffin were using methamphetamines and their fortnightly Centrelink payments were always spent on the drug in a day or two. Around the Easter holidays in 2014, Dhu told her grandmother Ruffin had physically assaulted her. Her grandmother helped Dhu leave Ruffin and paid for the 1,100 km (683.5 mi) bus journey from Geraldton to Karratha, where they had relatives. Ruffin discovered where Dhu had sought refuge and after several weeks persuaded her to return to him. They lived together in a rented house in South Hedland. In July 2014, Dhu told her father Ruffin had broken her ribs. Ruffin subsequently admitted this, saying he struck her after she had stabbed him in the leg with a pair of scissors.

=== Incarceration for unpaid fines in Western Australia ===
In 1991, the Royal Commission into Aboriginal Deaths in Custody report was released. One of its 339 recommendations was an end to issuing arrest warrants for unpaid fines, and another was the implementation of Custody Notification Schemes (CNS) in all Australian states and territories. At the time of Dhu's death, New South Wales (NSW) and the Australian Capital Territory (ACT) were the only state and territory to have implemented a CNS. The CNS consists of a 24-hour legal advice and support telephone hotline for any Aboriginal person taken into custody, connecting them with lawyers from the Aboriginal Legal Service. As of 2014, no Aboriginal person had died in custody in NSW or the ACT since the scheme was implemented.

At the time of Dhu's death, Western Australia was the only Australian state still imprisoning people for unpaid fines; NSW was the first state to abandon the practice following a death in custody in 1987. Every year between 2010 and 2014, more than 1,000 people were sent to prison in Western Australia for unpaid fines, and one third of imprisoned women were there for that reason. As of 2014, one sixth of imprisoned Aboriginal people were there for unpaid fines; the number increased from 33 to 223 between 2008 and 2013. In 2015, then Premier of Western Australia Colin Barnett acknowledged that the number of people incarcerated for unpaid fines is unknown but higher than official records show, as government statistics only count people being sent to prisons, and not those sent to police lockup cells for shorter periods. Between mid-2006 and mid-2016, 73% of female fine defaulters in Western Australia were unemployed, and 64% were Indigenous. Being jailed for unpaid fines in Western Australia resulted in a criminal record, whereas all other Australian states and territories considered fines a civil matter. Western Australia police did not have the discretion to ignore arrest warrants for unpaid fines under any circumstances.

== Arrest ==
On 2 August 2014, police received a telephone call informing them Ruffin had violated the terms of an apprehended violence order; at the later inquest into Dhu's death, nobody gave evidence about the caller's identity. Three months earlier, a warrant for Dhu's arrest for the unpaid fines relating to her three arrests when she was a teenager had been issued. When police arrived at their home and spoke to the pair, they discovered the outstanding arrest warrant for Dhu. Both were arrested and placed in adjoining cells in the South Hedland police station. Dhu's fines totalled A$3,622, and she was ordered to serve four days in custody to repay part of the debt at the standard rate of A$250 per day. As of March 2016, Ruffin was in prison for violating the apprehended violence order, burglary, assault and criminal damage. The Western Australia Prisoners' Review Board revoked his bail, saying he was "a lethal threat to the community".

== Deterioration and death ==
Dhu complained of pain soon after her arrest. When police asked Dhu why she was in pain, she was vague with her answers; Ruffin was sitting nearby when she was questioned. Police officers gave her two paracetamol tablets and took her to the Hedland Health Campus at 8 pm that night. After a brief examination, she was given a triage score of four; the second-lowest level of urgency. Annie Lang, the doctor who assessed Dhu, later told the inquest she believed Dhu's pain was genuine but that she was exaggerating her condition. She gave Dhu endone and diazepam, and declared her well enough to return to police custody. Dhu was returned to her cell shortly thereafter.

Over the next 20 hours, witnesses saw Dhu crying, calling for help, vomiting and asking to return to the hospital. CCTV footage shows Dhu being asked to rate her pain out of ten and replying "ten". When Sergeant Rick Bond went on duty as the senior officer on 3 August, he was told of Dhu's condition and telephoned her father to ask him whether he could pay Dhu's fines so she could be released. Dhu's father told Bond he did not have that much money and also told him Dhu was a user of methamphetamine. Bond later told the inquest he formed the opinion that Dhu was faking her condition so she would be removed from her cell; he informed other officers of his opinion. Late that afternoon, police took Dhu, who was handcuffed, back to the Health Campus. Medical staff notes said Dhu was "Crying in pain ... tachycardic, grunting, dehydrated and had a pulse rate of 126 beats a minute". They did not take her temperature because they had a shortage of thermometers. Triage nurse Alyce Heatherington told police "this could be withdrawal from drugs". Vafa Naderi, a doctor who had witnessed Dhu attending the Health Campus the previous night, performed an ultrasound examination on her chest then discharged her with a paracetamol tablet and declared her well enough to return to police custody. His notes from that night say "behavioural issues" and "drugs?" CCTV footage taken when police returned Dhu to the station showed a police officer saying, "Paracetamol? Paracetamol, after all that?" CCTV footage also showed Bond took another person held in police custody to Dhu's cell, told them to look at Dhu and said "This is what happens, you end up like this woman here. It's a good deterrent not to take drugs."

Dhu asked to go to the hospital again on the morning of 4 August, telling officers she was no longer able to stand. Officer Shelly Burgess, who had just arrived on shift, stated that Sergeant Bond told her Dhu was a "junkie" that was "full of shit" and "faking" her illness. Burgess said she accepted his assertion as "his word was law" and he had a reputation for "verbally attacking" people who questioned him. She testified that Bond whispered in Dhu's ear, "You're a fucking junkie and you've been to hospital twice before and this is not fucking on". Bond said he had not told Dhu she was a junkie, though said he may have used the term when talking about her to other officers. He said he had told her, "This is the last fucking time you're going to hospital" after agreeing for her to be returned there. CCTV footage showed Burgess forcing Dhu into a sitting position from the floor. After letting go of her arm, Dhu slumped back down and hit her head on the concrete. Burgess told the inquest that Dhu had slipped.

At 12:30 pm, Bond sent Dhu to the hospital for the third time. Burgess and Constable Christopher Matier handcuffed Dhu and carried her to the back of a police van; CCTV footage captured her moaning in pain and Matier saying "Oh shut up". Upon arrival at the Health Campus, Matier told a nurse "She's just putting it on; she's faking it"; nursing staff responded by saying she had had a heart attack. A team of medical staff attempted to resuscitate Dhu; Matier continued to inform them that she was faking her condition while they were making their resuscitation attempt. Fifty-three minutes after arriving at the hospital, Dhu was declared dead. Her death marked roughly 340 Aboriginal deaths in custody since the conclusion of the 1991 Royal Commission into Aboriginal Deaths in Custody.

== Coroner's inquest ==
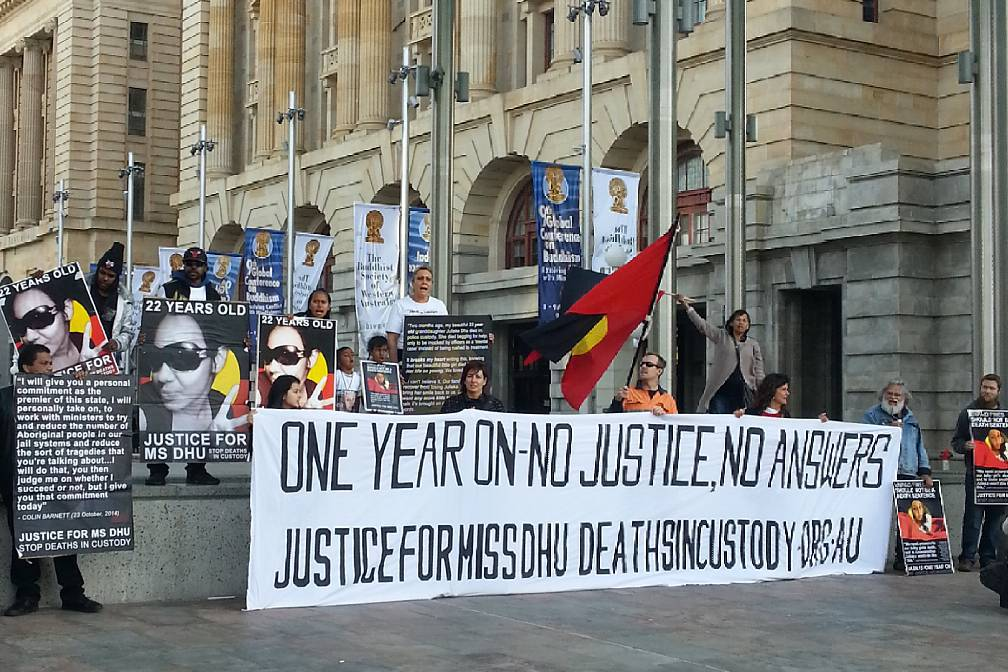
A protest held on the first anniversary of Dhu's death

In October 2014, after more details of her time in custody had been made public, Dhu's family asked for a coroner's inquest into her death. They also called for the end of imprisonment for unpaid fines, the introduction of a CNS, 24-hour medical coverage and independent oversight at all police stations, "and justice reinvestment into communities, not prisons". These calls were supported by Greens MP Robin Chapple. At that time, the government of Western Australia and WA police were still said to be investigating the matter; a report was being prepared for the coroner. Premier Barnett expressed his sympathy for Dhu's family at a Perth rally in late 2014, and promised to make sure that "the full truth will come out", but insisted the inquest they were calling for would not be necessary. In February 2016, an anonymous activist group called "allies of Ms Dhu" began projecting images of Dhu and her family on buildings in Perth to raise awareness over her death and the upcoming inquest. On the first anniversary of her death, multiple protests were held around Australia demanding an investigation. Dhu's death and her family's activism attracted national media attention, something that is rare for Aboriginal deaths in custody.

The inquest began in November 2015. Members of the public were warned that anyone wearing a T-shirt bearing the words "Justice for Julieka" would be denied entry. Two women wearing shirts that read "Indigenous Rights Defender" were not allowed to enter. On the first day, the inquest heard that Dhu's cause of death was pneumonia and sepsis resulting from broken ribs caused by Ruffin three months prior. CCTV footage of Dhu in police custody was also shown. Members of Dhu's family, medical staff involved in her treatments and 10 police officers were interviewed as part of the inquest. Dhu's mother testified that she twice telephoned the police station asking to speak to Dhu while she was in custody, but was refused permission. Human rights lawyer George Newhouse represented the Deaths In Custody Watch Committee (WA) Inc (DICWC WA) at the inquest. In the days after the inquest began, Dhu's family were subjected to a "flood" of online comments, suggesting that Dhu got what she deserved as she was a criminal.

Police and medical staff consistently testified they thought Dhu had been faking her illness; Burgess said she thought Dhu had pretended to faint to get quicker treatment. The inquest heard that 11 police officers had received disciplinary notices for failing to follow correct procedure and that an internal police investigation found four of them had "engaged in unprofessional conduct" and their handling of the situation was "without any sense of urgency ... [they] failed to comprehend and respond to the seriousness of the situation". Burgess received the severest disciplinary action of the eleven; a warning notice from the assistant commissioner for the "lack of urgency" she displayed after Dhu hit her head on the concrete. Three other officers were given written warnings and seven received verbal warnings. None of the warnings resulted in immediate disciplinary action; they only affected the officers' chances of promotion. Most of the police officers told the inquest that at the time they did not understand the notices or the reasons they had been given them. Two of the officers who received warnings had since been promoted; Sergeant Bond had quit the police force, telling the inquest he had done so for "family reasons". When asked if he treated Dhu inhumanely, Bond responded, "I wouldn't say inhumane. I would say unprofessional."

A medical expert testified that if Dhu's condition had been correctly diagnosed on her second visit to hospital, her life could have been saved. Sandra Thompson, professor of rural health at the University of Western Australia, told the inquest that if Dhu had been a white middle-class person, "there would have been much more effort made to understand what was going on with that person's pain. So that's what institutional racism represents." Senior medical officer Ganesan Sakarapani said the Hedland Health Campus did not have a culture of institutionalised racism and rejected a suggestion that if Dhu had been white, she would have been treated differently.

The inquest by State Coroner Rosalinda Fogliani was completed on 15 December 2016. Fogliani found that police had subjected Dhu to "unprofessional and inhumane" treatment that was "well below the standards that should ordinarily be expected". She stated Dhu's treatment at her second hospital visit was "deficient", that both police and hospital staff had been influenced by preconceived ideas about Aboriginals, and that the decision to handcuff Dhu when she was nearly unconscious was "shameful". While the inquest was still open, Fogliani declined requests to release the footage of Dhu in custody, saying that Dhu's privacy outweighed the public interest. The refusal resulted in a backlash from Dhu's family and Aboriginal rights groups, who argued the refusal amounted to a "cover up" of racism. A social media campaign, using the hashtag #releasethecctv, called for the footage to be released. Upon delivering the inquest's findings, Fogliani ordered that the footage be made public, with the exception of her third hospital visit. Fogliani did not recommend any criminal prosecutions against police or hospital staff, though did recommend the cessation of the practice of jailing people for unpaid fines and the introduction of a mandatory CNS.

=== Reaction ===
Dhu's family were unhappy with the result as the inquest did not hold any person accountable for her death, and told media they intended to pursue further legal action. WA Police Commissioner Karl O'Callaghan said he accepted that the police force had failed to provide for Dhu's safety, welfare and dignity. Dennis Eggington, the chief executive of the Aboriginal Legal Service of Western Australia (ALSWA), said the coroner's recommendations were "fine" but they had come too late. Upon receiving a copy of the inquest, Premier Barnett indicated that he would not be implementing either of its recommendations.

Shortly after the release of the inquest, singer Felix Riebl composed a tribute song titled "Ms Dhu", and released an accompanying music video criticising the police and the government over her death. Images of Dhu and footage of her treatment by police have circulated online in association with the Black Lives Matter, SayHerName and Idle No More movements, which was credited with creating solidarity between Aboriginal campaigns for justice and North American and global movements.

An article in the journal Social & Legal Studies argued that Dhu's death was inherently linked to "gendered, institutional and structural racism" endemic to Australia, and that the coroner showed little consideration for this and instead attributed the death to a series of "individual failures". The article noted the inquest's finding that the only person who treated Dhu with dignity was the most inexperienced officer involved, and argued that this was because that officer had had the least amount of exposure to the culture of the WA police force. An article in the journal Settler Colonial Studies reached similar conclusions, arguing that the inquest was "a performative attempt in the maintenance of [Australia's colonial] conquest", which was "incapable of addressing the foundations of Ms. Dhu's suffering: colonial patriarchy and dispossession, in the form of the settler carceral state".

== Aftermath ==
=== Recommendations ===
In June 2015, in direct response to Dhu's death, the WA state government announced that police detention would be made safer and that efforts would be made to keep some low-level offenders and youth offenders out of custody. It did not clarify whether this would include people who had unpaid fines. ALSWA welcomed the announcement but said it needed to be backed up with action. Dhu's grandmother said the proposed changes did not address all of her concerns, though they were a good start. Joe Francis, then Minister for Corrective Services, opposed any plans to end jailing people for unpaid fines; earlier that year he had called for even harsher penalties for fine defaulters, including longer prison sentences. Marc Newhouse, chairman of the DICWC WA, said Francis' proposal made government promises to reduce the incarceration rate for Aboriginals "look like a lie", and University of Western Australia criminologist Hilde Tubex said such a proposal would negatively impact Indigenous people, women and those affected by poverty.

In May 2016, a report by Neil Morgan, Inspector of Custodial Services, recommended that WA stop jailing people for unpaid fines. His report mentioned the Dhu case. In October 2016 Nigel Scullion, the federal Minister for Indigenous Affairs, offered to fund the first three years of implementation for any state that legislated a CNS. The WA state government rejected the offer. In March 2017, just prior to the 2017 state election, Dhu's family criticised both of the major political parties in WA for not supporting such a scheme. The incumbent Liberal Party voiced their opposition to the program while the Labor Party said they would consider the scheme but made no commitments. The Labor Party voiced its support for the end of the jailing of people for unpaid fines.

=== Compensation payment and apology ===
In September 2017, Dhu's family were awarded A$1.1 million ex gratia and received a formal apology from the WA state government. The payment does not prevent Dhu's family from taking further legal action, and was separate from a civil suit lodged in the Supreme Court of Western Australia in July 2017 by them. Dhu's grandmother said she was surprised by the payment and apology, though she would have rather seen people held accountable for Dhu's death. Then Attorney-General of Western Australia John Quigley, who announced the payment, also reaffirmed his intention to implement a mandatory CNS. In October 2017, the Australian federal government was reported to be urging the other states and territories to implement a CNS. John Quigley supported such a program, saying if the Aboriginal Legal Service had been contacted about Ms Dhu's arrest "it would have been a very different outcome". An online petition calling for the scheme was signed by almost 20,000 people in less than one week.

In May 2018, Dhu's cousin Alira Kelly-Ryder was informed a warrant for her arrest had been issued for unpaid fines. Kelly-Ryder had been making regular repayments on the fines but was unable to continue doing so after she became unemployed when her work contract was not renewed. A crowdsourcing campaign raised the money to pay the fines, and Kelly-Ryder then offered to pay the debt, though was informed the warrant had been withdrawn. Kelly-Ryder believed the publicity surrounding her case caused the withdrawal, though she asked "what about everybody else in my position; are you going to withdraw their [arrest warrants]?" At the time, a reform proposal to end jailing people for unpaid fines was expected to be introduced in the WA state parliament later in 2018. In October 2018, John Quigley said he would introduce legislative amendments regarding unpaid fines in 2019.

=== Custody Notification Service founded ===
In May 2018, it was announced that the WA state government had reconsidered the offer from the federal government to fund a CNS, and that the service would be operational by the end of 2018, and operated by ALSWA. The service was delayed multiple times due to issues over funding, though was launched in October 2019.

=== Legislative amendments ===
In September 2019, an Aboriginal woman who had been violently assaulted was arrested and imprisoned by police for unpaid fines after she sought their assistance. After the incident, Quigley said the legislative amendments would be introduced "within weeks". Said legislation was introduced later that month, and received royal assent on 19 June 2020. On 20 June 2020, all outstanding warrants for fine defaulters were cancelled, and new warrants are no longer allowed to be issued.

=== Doctor fined ===
In April 2021, Vafa Naderi, the doctor who assessed Dhu on 3 August and declared her fit to be detained, was fined $30,000 by the State Administrative Tribunal of Western Australia. The Tribunal found Naderi's actions constituted professional misconduct, concluding he provided "inadequate and substantially below-standard care" to Dhu, though did not suspend him from practising medicine, noting his remorse, acknowledgement of his mistake and the fact he had no previous disciplinary charges.

== See also ==
- Aboriginal deaths in custody
- Sandra Bland – American woman who died in police custody
