= Eddie Murray (rugby league) =

Australian rugby league player (1959–1981)

- Born: 6 December 1959
- Died: 12 June 1981 (aged 21)
- Occupation: Rugby league footballer
- Known for: Death while in police custody

Edward James Murray (6 December 1959 – 12 June 1981) was an Australian rugby league player who was controversially found dead in his police cell in the New South Wales town of Wee Waa within an hour of having been detained for being drunk and disorderly under the 1979 Intoxicated Persons Act (a law repealed in 2005). Murray had planned to travel to Sydney, to join the Redfern All Blacks Rugby League team's tour of New Zealand when he was detained.

Police claimed that they found Murray hanging in his cell at the Wee Waa Police Station around 3:30pm, and argued that he committed suicide, although this occurred prior to the majority of Aboriginal deaths in custody which were later examined in the 1987 Royal Commission. He was 21 years old at the time. Eddie Murray's parents, Leila Jane (née Button) and Arthur Edward Murray remained unconvinced that their son's death was a suicide, and fought for a more extensive investigation into Murray's death. Murray's death has helped to draw attention to the issue of Aboriginal deaths in custody.

Murray's case has drawn the attention of several investigations, including the Muirhead Royal Commission, the NSW Anti-Discrimination Board Report on Street Offences, and his case was one of the first to be investigated by the Royal Commission into Aboriginal Deaths in Custody in 1988.

In 1997, Murray's body was exhumed and re-autopsied, revealing a previously undetected smashed sternum, and a forensic pathologist determined that the injury had most likely occurred immediately prior to his death. Despite this, the details of his death remain a mystery, and still no one has been officially implicated in his death. This has been to the dissatisfaction of Murray's family, who have called for a more extensive inquiry.

== See also ==
- Royal Commission into Aboriginal Deaths in Custody
- 2004 Palm Island death in custody
- Institutional racism
