= Brewarrina riot =

1987 riot by Aboriginal Australians in Brewarrina, NSW

The Brewarrina riot was a 1987 riot by Aboriginal Australian men in the town of Brewarrina, in the north-west of the state of New South Wales, Australia, after a death in custody of local man James Lloyd Boney. It was a significant event in Aboriginal history and race relations in Australia, as well as having continuing legal impact for years afterwards.

== Background ==
There had been long-running tensions between Aboriginal people in the far west of the state during the 1980s. In addition, police treatment of Aboriginal people was under increased media scrutiny during years leading up to the Royal Commission into Aboriginal Deaths in Custody, which had been announced on 10 August 1987.

James Lloyd Boney (born 1959), was a rural labourer, one of 16 children, and practically illiterate. He committed petty crimes from a young age and abused alcohol, which exacerbated his epilepsy. After being arrested for domestic violence against his partner Grace in early 1987, he was arrested for breaching his bail conditions on 6 August. He died from hanging with a football sock, within 95 minutes of being locked up in a police cell.

== The riot ==
On 15 August 1987, the riot began on after local police attempted to disperse the wake for Lloyd James Boney. The wake was being held in a local park, after the family had gained the proper permission from the Brewarrina council.

Attendees at the wake fought back, and police retreated to a hotel on an intersection, where they positioned themselves on the verandah armed with rifles. Further conflict lasted around 30 minutes, with Aboriginal men throwing bottles at the hotel and battling police in the intersection. Over 150 Aboriginal Australians rioted, causing property damage and clashing with police.

== Aftermath ==
In 1988 a coronial inquiry held at Dubbo found that Boney had died of asphyxia by hanging, and made a number of recommendations to improve police procedures to prevent such deaths in custody.

Two men, Arthur Murray and Sonny Bates, were put on trial for the riots, which lasted for five years and resulted in their conviction. it was widely covered in the press, represented in differing ways. In 1991, both convictions were overturned, The High Court criticised the evidence brought forward by Brewarrina police as unreliable.

The riot was a significant event in Aboriginal history and race relations in Australia, as well as having continuing legal impact for years afterwards. Much has been written by academics and others about the significance and interpretations of the riot. Barry Morris of the University of Newcastle wrote "The Brewarrina 'riot' acted as a switch point, where both conservative and liberal polity contested the changing nature of Aboriginal autonomy and polity within the Australian state". Roderic Pitty notes that the riot lasted for about half an hour, not five hours, as recorded in the Encyclopaedia of Aboriginal Australia, and says that the grounds on which the men were convicted were very shaky.
