= North Australian Aboriginal Justice Agency =

Legal service in the Northern Territory

North Australian Aboriginal Justice Agency (NAAJA)
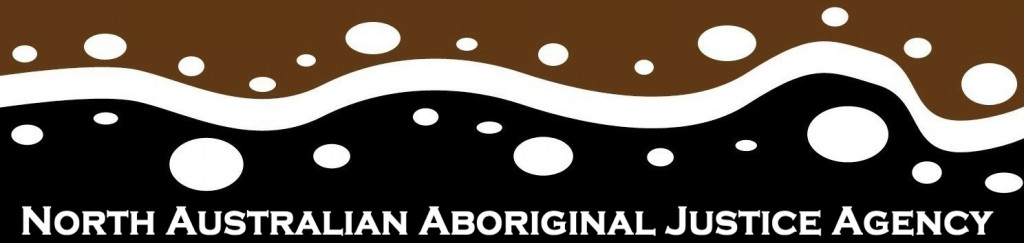
- Major practice areas: Criminal law Civil law Custody Notification Service
- Date founded: 2006
- Website: www.naaja.org.au

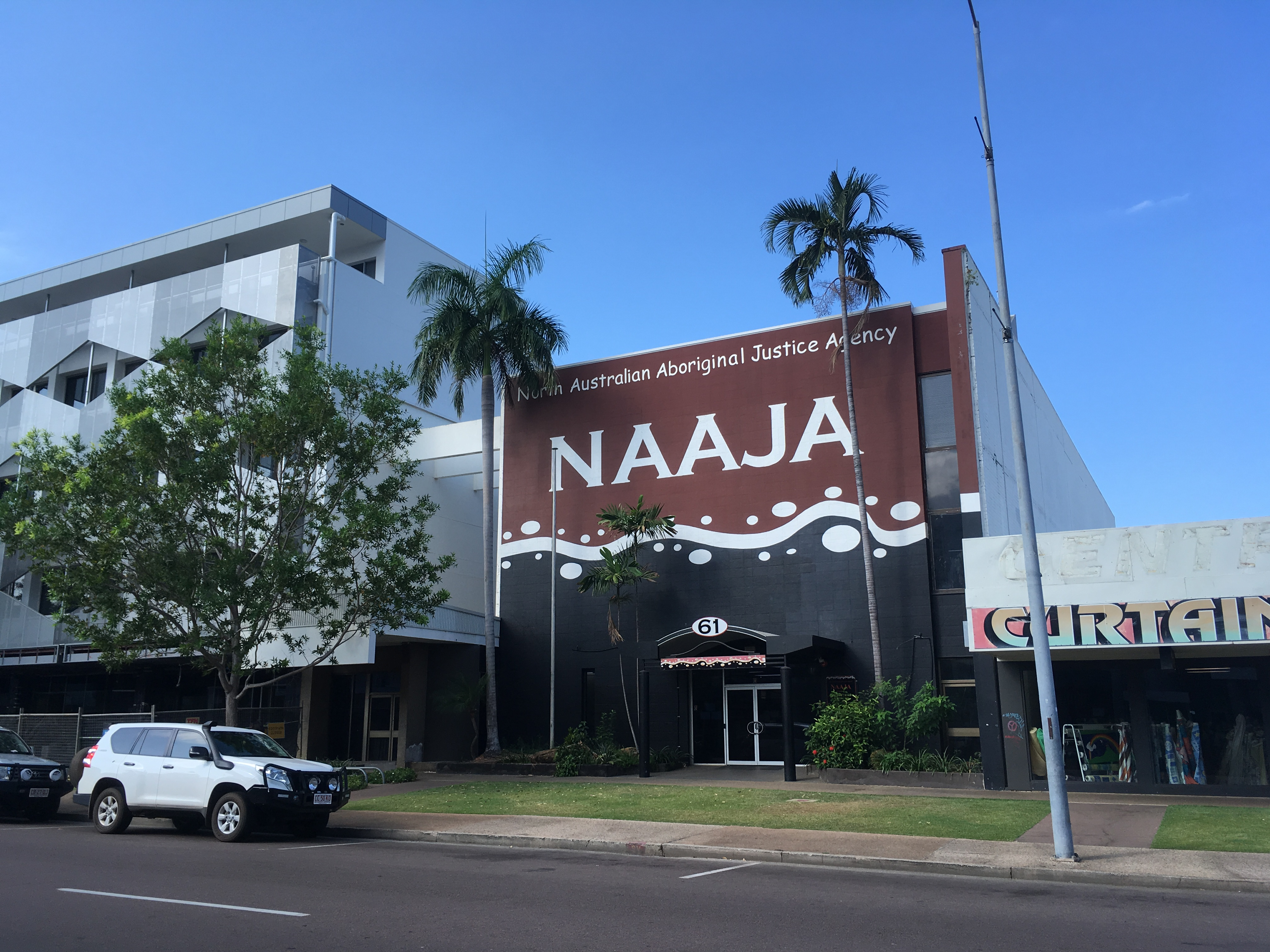
The North Australian Aboriginal Justice Agency (NAAJA) in Darwin.

The North Australian Aboriginal Justice Agency (NAAJA) is a not-for-profit legal service which provides criminal law and civil law services to Aboriginal people and their families across the Northern Territory of Australia. Since 2019, it has operated the NT Custody Notification Service, whereby they are notified by NT Police when Indigenous Australians are taken into police custody.

== History ==
In 1972 the first Aboriginal Legal Aid office in the Northern Territory was established in Darwin, for provision of services to Aboriginal people in the Top End, which led to the establishment of the North Australian Aboriginal Legal Aid Service (NAALAS) in 1973. Around the same time, Neville Perkins and others were setting up the Central Australian Aboriginal Legal Aid Service (CAALAS), which later became part of NAAJA.

In 1985 the Katherine Regional Aboriginal Legal Aid Service (KRALAS) was established for the Katherine region, and in 1996 the MIWATJ Aboriginal legal Service (MALS) was created to service East Arnhem Land.

NAAJA was established in February 2006 as an amalgamation of NAALAS, KRALAS and MALS. The first NAAJA Chairperson was Eddie Cubillo.

NAAJA received a National Crime Prevention Award in 2012 for its Throughcare program, which works to reduce rates of reoffending in the Northern Territory.

NAAJA's Principal Legal Officer David Woodroffe received the 2017 Law Award from the Australian Human Rights Commission.

On 1 January 2018 NAAJA began operations in Central Australia (Alice Springs).

== Work ==
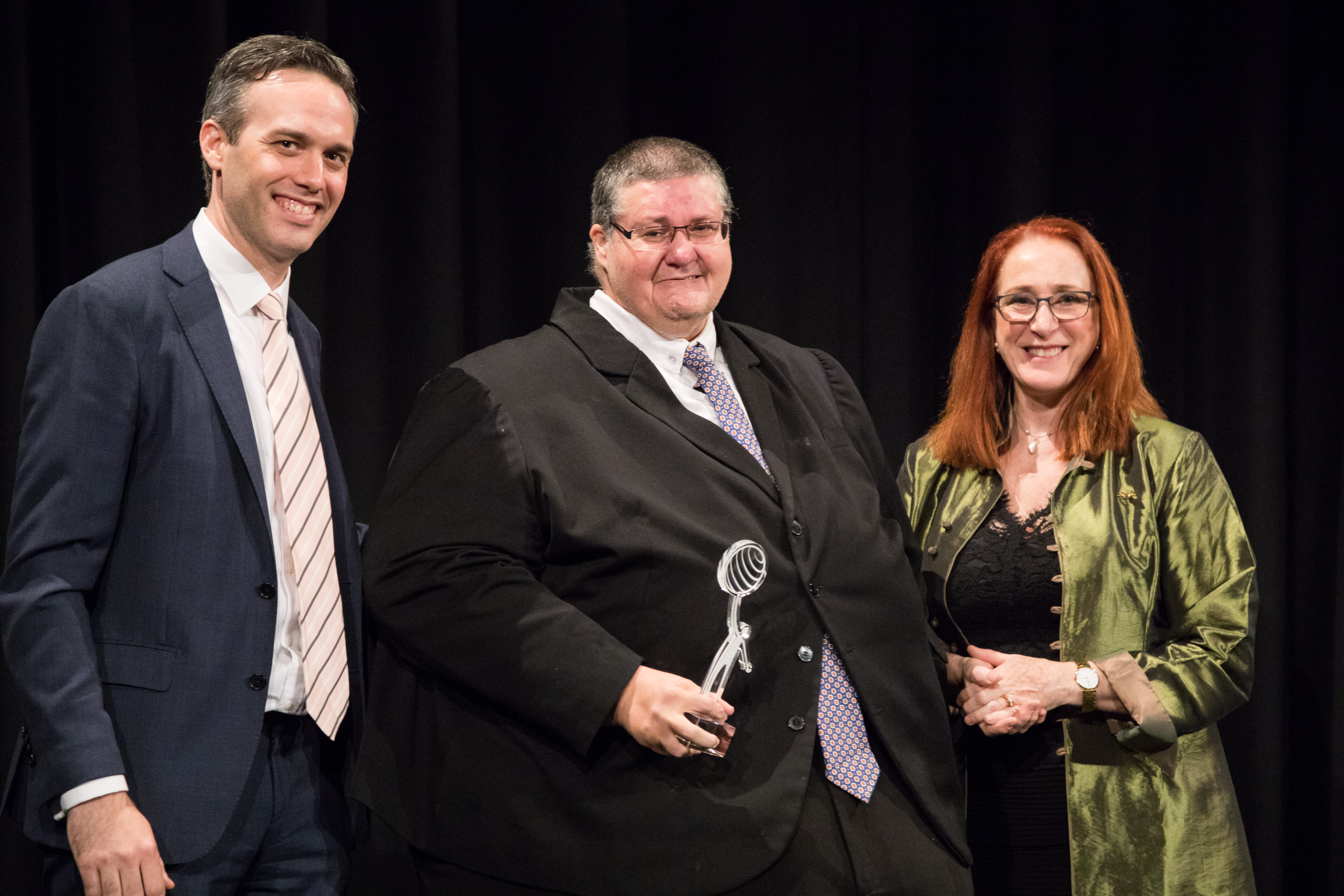
Principal Legal Officer David Woodroffe (centre) receiving the 2017 Law Award from the AHRC

NAAJA is the largest legal service in the Northern Territory, with more than 170 full-time staff, of whom 43% are Aboriginal, and which includes 63 solicitors as of July 2019. It has offices in Darwin, Katherine, Tennant Creek, Nhulunbuy and Alice Springs. It delivers criminal and civil law services throughout the Northern Territory. Its key areas of service are:

- Criminal Law representation and advice.
- Civil Law representation and advice.
- Custody Notification Service (CNS)

The Custody Notification Service has been in operation since January 2019, after the Commonwealth government had announced three years of funding for NAAJA to administer the service in the NT.

Priscilla Atkins, who had been CEO for many years, was sacked at the end of 2022, and was suing for wrongful dismissal in 2023. In November 2023 the position was vacant again after two acting CEOs had resigned before the end of their terms.

== Notable work ==
- Majindi case
- Royal Commission into the Protection and Detention of Children in the Northern Territory

== See also ==
- Aboriginal Legal Service (NSW/ACT)
- Aboriginal Legal Service of Western Australia
