= First Nations Deaths In Custody Watch Committee =

First Nations Committee: 2015, Australia

The First Nations Deaths In Custody Watch Committee was first registered on 7 January 2015, but its first annual report under that name was for 2017. It is the successor to the Deaths In Custody Watch Committee (WA) (DICWC WA), which was a social justice organisation operating from Perth, Western Australia from 1996 until it underwent a constitutional change early 2017. It is a Public Benevolent Institution whose main concern is Aboriginal Australian deaths in custody.

== History ==
The DICWC WA was first founded as one of several federal government-funded anti-deaths-in-custody "watch" groups across Australia, being the implementation of one of the recommendations of the 1991 Royal Commission into Aboriginal Deaths in Custody (RCIADIC).

The formation of the Watch Committee groups and the 1991 Royal Commission itself gained significant political momentum from the work of WA academic Jennifer Searcy, who in 1987 began publishing her "Campaign for the Prevention of Custodial Death" newsletter. This 1 page newsletter was mailed monthly at her own expense to thousands of high profile supporters including lawyers, journalists, academics, social justice campaigners, religious leaders, and politicians alike all across Australia. Her last newsletter was published shortly after the formation of DICWC WA group and constitute a public historical record of the callous treatment vulnerable people received in WA prisons.

The Uniting Church of Australia in Western Australia was a founding "partner" in the formation of the DICWC WA.

From 1996 to 2004 the DICWC WA was funded via the Aboriginal and Torres Strait Islander Commission (ATSIC). After ATSIC was dismantled in 2004, the 2006 Board of the DICWC WA voted to continue the DICWC WA as a non-funded organisation.

The 1996-2006 period case files of the DICWC WA were, from 2006 until 2011, stored in the garage of a long-term supporter, and transferred to the Battye Library in 2014. The transfer of the files lead to the creation of the DICWC WA archive at Battye Library, which Bruce Campbell, as Secretary and then Chairperson, would on occasion add to with non-case material such as Board minutes and rally fliers.

From 2006 on, the DICWC WA functioned primarily as a lobby group aiming to pressure the State and Federal Governments into taking practical action against deaths in custody. The main DICWC WA tactic was organising public rallies on significant days, such as the 25th anniversary of the release of the 1991 report of Royal Commission into Aboriginal Deaths In Custody.

In August 2016, it responded to an article by Marcia Langton in The Monthly on the topic of Indigenous women in prison.

== See also ==
- Aboriginal deaths in custody
- Custody Notification Service
- Deaths In Custody Watch Committee (WA) Inc
- Royal Commission into Aboriginal Deaths in Custody
