= Aboriginal Legal Service of Western Australia =

Australian legal services organisation for Indigenous people

The Aboriginal Legal Service of Western Australia (ALSWA) is an organisation in Western Australia, founded in the early 1970s, that provides legal services to Aboriginal Australians and Torres Strait Islanders. It receives financial grants from the Commonwealth Department of the Australian Attorney General and follows conditions required by that Department. It commenced its Custody Notification Service on 2 October 2019.

== History ==
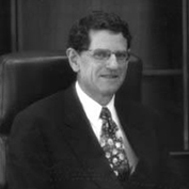
Robert French, here pictured when he was Chief Justice of the High Court of Australia decades later, was one of the young lawyers involved in setting up the ALSWA.

The Western Aboriginal Legal Service was founded by Essie Coffey, George Winterton, Robert French and others. Winterton had previously been involved in providing pro bono (free) legal advice to Aboriginal people. The poverty and legal injustices suffered by Aboriginal people in the area were a contributing factor in the founders becoming involved in legal representation and advocacy for them; in 1969 Aboriginal people constituted 25% of the prison population in Western Australia, while being only 2.5% of the population. Curfews directed against Aboriginal people were common in some areas until the early 1970s, and detention without cause and unprovoked physical attacks by the police also occurred.

In 1972 the group wrote to the Australian government asking for a small amount of money to enable a roster of lawyers to be available to represent Aboriginal people locally. To their surprise, the newly appointed minister for Aboriginal affairs, Gordon Bryant, eventually responded asking how much financial support would be required from the government to provide legal representation for Aboriginal people in the whole of the state of Western Australia. The service initially operated from the Aboriginal Centre located on Beaufort Street in Perth. In 1973 it had "2 lawyers, 3 Aboriginal court officers and a secretary".

Rob Riley was CEO of the organisation from 1990 to 1995. By the 21st century, Aboriginal people make up 40% of the prison population in Western Australia, despite still only constituting 3.5% of the population, and 65% of juveniles detained within the legal system are Aboriginal people.

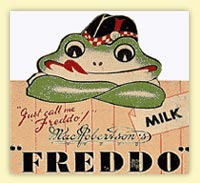
ALSWA represented a 12-year-old boy who was held in a police cell for hours after being given a stolen "Freddo frog" chocolate (1930s logo pictured).

In 2009 the ALSWA represented a 12-year-old Aboriginal boy who was charged with receiving stolen goods after he had been given a chocolate Freddo frog stolen from a shop in Northam near Perth; Colin Barnett, the Premier of Western Australia, subsequently said that the frog had "held the whole police system up to ridicule". After missing a court date in connection with the matter, the boy, who had no previous convictions, had been arrested and held for several hours in a police cell. Peter Collins, director of the ALSWA at the time, suggested that the charges were because the boy was Aboriginal, and that the same action would not have been taken against a "non-Aboriginal kid from an affluent Perth suburb with professional parents". Northam police denied this, and said the boy had come to their attention in the past.

The charges were subsequently dropped, and an order for legal costs of one thousand Australian dollars was made in the boy's favour. The chocolate Freddo frog itself was not recovered because it had been eaten. The ALSWA maintained that the case was typical of over-policing of Aboriginal communities and especially an inappropriate eagerness to bring Aboriginal juveniles into the legal system and possible detention. It also highlighted the frequency of Aboriginal children being incarcerated solely due to failure to meet the basic juvenile bail condition of a "responsible adult" being present into whose custody they could be released.

Another case on which the ALSWA spoke out was the death in custody on 3 April 2009 of the Aboriginal community leader Mr. Ward, who was "a renowned artist and senior in customary law", as well as being chosen to represent his people on a mission to China. After being arrested in Laverton, he died of heatstroke in a van driven by a private security firm, which had been the subject of complaints over several years previously, after the temperature around him reached between 50 and 56 °C (122 and 133 °F) on a journey of 380 kilometres (240 miles). The coroner described it as "a terrible death while in custody which was wholly unnecessary and avoidable". The Chief Executive Officer of ALSWA, Dennis Eggington, noted his disgust, stating that "We don't treat animals like that". The security guards driving the van were fined a few thousand Australian dollars each, and no other action was taken.

Criticisms of ALSWA made in a book by Fiona Skyring included suggestions that the service works to defend Aboriginal men against all manner of charges, while doing little to help Aboriginal women and children, who are sometimes the victims of domestic violence. Some within the Aboriginal communities also suggested that the ALSWA did not do enough to prevent arrests of Aboriginal people; and some police organisations, conservative politicians and newspapers have also spoken out against the ALSWA. There have also been political divisions within the organization itself. The ALSWA has worked to improve interpreting services for Aboriginal defendants, although such services are still "nowhere near as comprehensive as they need to be". Despite its origins when lawyers were mainly white, ALSWA now claims to employ "the highest number of Aboriginal lawyers of any legal service in Australia".

Skyring's book describing the history of the organization won the Western Australian Premier's Book Awards for 2011.

From 2011, the organization has held special consultative status with the United Nations Economic and Social Council.

== Custody Notification Service ==
On 21 May 2018, it was announced that the WA state government had reconsidered the offer from the federal government to fund a Custody Notification Service, and that the service would be operational by the end of the year. The Custody Notification Service was entered into as a result of the inquest into the 2014 death of Ms Dhu, one of several notable Aboriginal deaths in custody. ALSWA will operate the service. In November 2018 it was announced the service would be operational in the first half of 2019. The service would cost A$952,000 per year, with the Federal Government and State Government contributing A$750,000 and A$202,000 respectively. ALSWA would employ five lawyers and two support staff to run the service. ALSWA commenced its CNS service on 2 October 2019. Under the Police Force Amendment Regulations 2019 (WA), Western Australia Police will be required to phone the CNS every time an Aboriginal person, child or adult, is detained in a police facility, regardless of the reason.

== See also ==
- Aboriginal Community Court
- Aboriginal Legal Service (NSW/ACT)
- North Australian Aboriginal Justice Agency
