= Aboriginal deaths in custody =

Political and social issue in Australia

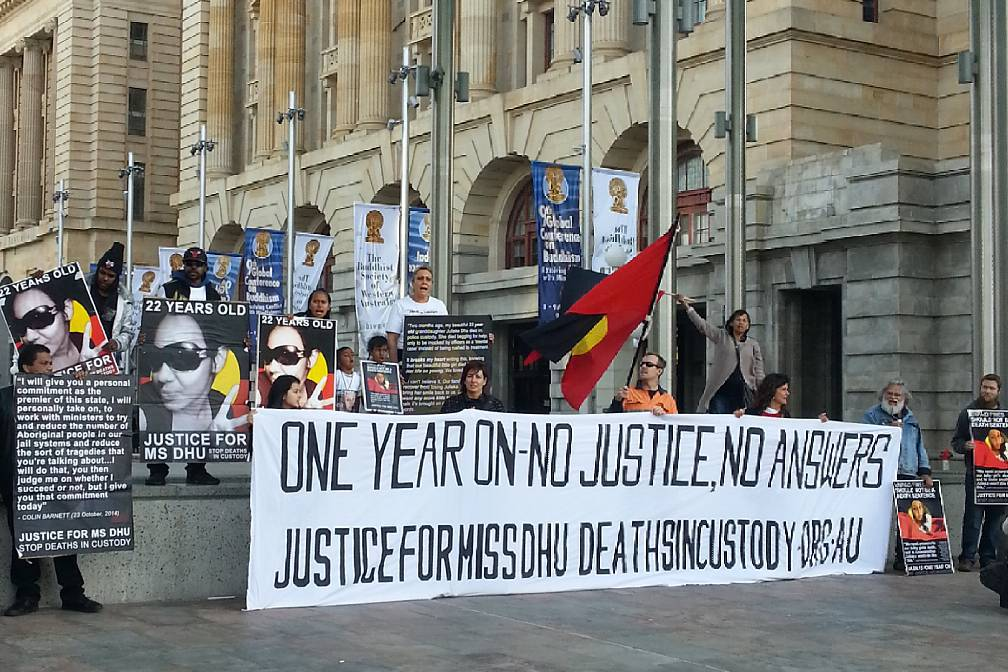
A protest calling for reform to prevent Aboriginal deaths in custody, Forrest Place, Perth, c. 2015.

Aboriginal deaths in custody is a political and social issue in Australia. It rose in prominence in the early 1980s, with Aboriginal activists campaigning following the death of 16-year-old John Peter Pat in 1983. Subsequent deaths in custody, considered suspicious by families of the deceased, culminated in the 1987 Royal Commission into Aboriginal Deaths in Custody (RCIADIC).

The final RCIADIC report, published in 1991, did not find higher rates of death of Aboriginal Australians compared to non-Aboriginal Australians; however, it did highlight deficiencies in care, both systemic and individual, and disproportionate rates of imprisonment due to historical and social factors. As of 2020, Aboriginal Australians maintain a disproportionate level of exposure to the justice system and incarceration in Australia. One of the recommendations of the RCIADIC was that statistics and other information on Aboriginal and non-Aboriginal deaths in custody should be monitored nationally on an ongoing basis, by the Australian Institute of Criminology (AIC). As Australian census and prison statistics include both Aboriginal and Torres Strait Islander people, the counts have included both groups, as Indigenous Australians.

The Australian Institute for Health and Welfare reports that the total Indigenous age specific deaths in 2018 were 164 per 100,000 for 25-34 year olds, and 368 for 35-44 year olds. These are the most relevant age groups for the current 12,000 Indigenous prisoners, with a median age of 32. In a group of 12,000 Indigenous 25-44 year olds, an average yearly death rate of around 32 per year occurs even outside prison. The Indigenous death rate in prison is about 15 per year, or half of this.

As of June 2021 the AIC had recorded 489 Indigenous deaths in custody since the Royal Commission (June 1991). The majority (65%) had been prison deaths with almost all the rest of the deaths in police custody or custody related operations. The AIC's monitoring program reports Indigenous Australians have made up 18% of prison deaths and 20% of deaths in police custody or custody related operations in this time. This is well above their proportion in the general population that was 3.3% in the 2016 national census.

Although the majority of deaths occurring in prison custody have been of natural causes (58%), hanging deaths accounted for 32%, but the latter have shown a marked decrease in recent years. Although they are greatly over-represented in the prisons, Indigenous prisoners have had a lower death rate than non-Indigenous prisoners since 2003. In 2020-21 the death rate for Indigenous prisoners was 0.09 per 100 compared to the non-Indigenous rate of 0.18. Unfortunately, for technical reasons it is not possible to calculate death rates of Indigenous or non-Indigenous people in police custody or custody related operations. Of deaths in police custody, the total between mid-1991 and mid-2016 was 146, with 47% attributed to accidental death (with most of these happening under police pursuit). 21% were attributed to natural causes, with self-inflicted deaths accounting for 19%. There is, however, a number of cases in which calls have been made for greater scrutiny, as avoidable deaths, such as those of Ms Dhu, Tanya Day, David Dungay and Rebecca Maher. Additional protests focusing on Aboriginal deaths in custody, accompanied by renewed media attention, were triggered by the murder of George Floyd in the US as part of the June 2020 protests in Australia.

Aboriginal deaths in custody and high incarceration rates were originally absent from the Australian Government's "Closing the Gap" strategy. As part of a 2018 pivot to a new phase, the Council of Australian Governments (COAG) drafted targets to reduce Aboriginal custody rates by 2028.

== Background ==
=== Royal Commission into Aboriginal Deaths in Custody ===
Concern about the high number of Aboriginal people who had died in custody in the 1980s led to the establishment of the Royal Commission into Aboriginal Deaths in Custody (RCIADIC) in 1987, to investigate and report upon the underlying social, cultural and legal issues behind the deaths, including allegations of mistreatment of prisoners which may have led to their deaths. It ran from 1987 to 1991, investigating the period between 1 January 1980 and 31 May 1989, producing its final report in April 1991.

The 1988 Australian Institute of Criminology publication, Aboriginal Deaths in Custody, says "The issue of Aboriginal deaths in prisons and holding cells is particularly complex". The report looks at the cases identified by RCIADIC by April 1988. Criminologist Duncan Chappell, in his introduction to the report, writes that while the "problem of death in custody is by no means limited to Aboriginals", the "problem of Aboriginal deaths in custody is linked to fundamental issues which go beyond matters of criminal justice. It would be unfortunate if, by focusing on the criminal justice system, we lost sight of the profound social, cultural and economic problems which confront Aboriginal people". At the time of RCIADIC, there was no ability to compare Aboriginal with non-Aboriginal deaths in custody because the information was not available from state and territory governments. At that time, the greatest number of Aboriginal deaths in custody had occurred in Western Australia and Queensland, half of the victims were under 28 years old, and the most common cause of death was hanging. More detailed analysis was needed, for instance into the different factors operating in police custody compared with correctional facilities.

The term "death in custody" was defined in the RCIADIC report to include people under arrest (in police custody) or during the process of attempted detainment (including under police pursuit); on remand (pre-trial detention), in prison or juvenile detention after sentencing, or attempting to escape from police or prison custody.

RCIADIC concluded that the deaths were not caused by deliberate killing by police and prison officers, but that "glaring deficiencies existed in the standard of care afforded to many of the deceased". It reported that "Aboriginal people died in custody at the same rate as non-Aboriginal prisoners, but they were far more likely to be in prison than non-Aboriginal people", and that child removal (leading to what has since been dubbed the Stolen Generation) was a "significant precursor to these high rates of imprisonment". Many other historical and social factors were considered, showing a complex network of reasons as to why Aboriginal people were imprisoned at a higher rate.

A 2018 review by Deloitte commissioned in December 2017 by the then Indigenous Affairs Minister, Nigel Scullion, found that only 64% of the recommendations had been fully implemented. It reported that 14% were "mostly implemented", 16% were "partly implemented" and 6% not at all. It also found that monitoring of deaths in custody had decreased nationwide, and the quality of data on police custody was "an ongoing issue". Prison safety had increased, but more staff were needed for mental and other health issues of Aboriginal prisoners. Regular in-cell checks, particularly in police watch houses, were still deficient in some jurisdictions.

=== Disproportionate rates of imprisonment ===
Aboriginal and Torres Strait Islander people made up approximately 3.3% of the Australian population (798,365) in the 2016 Australian census. As of June 2018, Indigenous Australians aged 18 years and over were approximately 2% of the total adult population, while Indigenous prisoners accounted for 28% of the adult prison population, meaning that Indigenous adults are 15 times more likely to be imprisoned than non-Indigenous adults.

The rate of imprisonment of Indigenous Australians almost doubled between 1991 and 2018.

Indigenous youth are 26 times more likely to be placed in detention. According to the Australian Institute of Health and Welfare, in the June quarter of 2019 there was an average of 949 young people in detention per night: 90% of these were male, and 63% not yet sentenced. Indigenous youths made up 53% of the number. In the four years preceding June 2019, there were no clear trends shown in any of the statistical measures.

The Attorney-General for Australia commissioned the Australian Law Reform Commission (ALRC) in October 2016 to examine the factors leading to the disproportionate numbers of Indigenous peoples in Australian prisons, and to look at ways of reforming legislation which might ameliorate this "national tragedy". The result of this in-depth enquiry was a report titled Pathways to Justice – Inquiry into the Incarceration Rate of Aboriginal and Torres Strait Islander Peoples, which was received by the Attorney-General in December 2017 and tabled in Parliament on 28 March 2018. The report made 13 recommendations, covering many aspects of the legal framework and police and justice procedures, including that non-payment of fines should not result in imprisonment.

=== Qualified improvement in death rate ===
Overall, the rate of Indigenous deaths in custody has reduced since 1991, as of June 2020 lower than the rate of death of non-Indigenous people, which the AIC attributes to improved care by police and corrective services. However the rate of imprisonment of Indigenous people has climbed steeply, which is related to the higher number of deaths when compared with the 10 years examined by the RCIDIAC (99 in 10 years, compared with about 437 in 29 years). Non-Indigenous people have died in custody in greater numbers and at a higher rate than Indigenous people, since 1991; however, with the much higher numbers of imprisonment of Indigenous people, there are more deaths as a proportion of their total population.

=== Issues in WA ===
Attorney-General for Western Australia, John Quigley, said in June 2020 that there was "systematic discrimination" against Indigenous people in the Western Australian justice system. Statistically, Indigenous people were far more likely to be stopped and questioned by police than non-Indigenous, more likely to be charged if arrested by police and less likely to get bail. Imprisonment of Indigenous people in WA was 4.1 per cent, compared with 2.6 nationally. The number of Indigenous adults going to prison, and young people being held in detention was still increasing, although the rate of imprisonment had slowed. He said that legislative reforms were being planned. WA has a higher number of Aboriginal deaths in custody since 1991 than any other state or territory.

On 17 June 2020 reforms to the legislation relating to jail sentences for unpaid fines, long a bone of contention, spurred on by the death of Ms Dhu in 2014 and finally introduced into Parliament in September 2019, was passed in WA. Between 1 July 2018 and 30 June 2019, 430 people spent time in custody for unpaid fines. Under the new legislation, most fine defaulters will do community service if they fail to pay, with imprisonment a last resort, by order of a magistrate only. The change was recommended by RCIADIC in 1991.

Data covering the period 2014–2024 showed that WA had the highest rate of Indigenous deaths in custody per capita.

=== Definition ===
The RCIDIAC's Recommendation No. 6 in its final report stipulated that "death in custody" includes at least the following categories when considering post-death investigations:

a. The death wherever occurring of a person who is in prison custody or police custody or detention as a juvenile;
b. The death wherever occurring of a person whose death is caused or contributed to by traumatic injuries sustained or by lack of proper care whilst in such custody or detention;
c. The death wherever occurring of a person who dies or is fatally injured in the process of police or prison officers attempting to detain that person; and
d. The death wherever occurring of a person who dies or is fatally injured in the process of that person escaping or attempting to escape from prison custody or police custody or juvenile detention.

The Police Association of South Australia proposed a change to the legal definition in June 2020. PASA President Mark Carroll said that police were only involved in "very few" of these cases, with most of them occurring through natural causes, suicide or violence between prisoners, and that several had occurred when the subjects had tried to flee from police and come to harm, including fatal car crashes. However this idea was opposed by the Aboriginal Legal Rights Movement (ALRM) and the opposition (Labor) Aboriginal Affairs spokesperson Kyam Maher, who said that it was important to keep consistency in the statistics for comparison purposes.

== Statistics ==
=== Sources ===
Statistics on deaths in custody are extracted from different sources; there is no single authoritative list of deaths in custody, of any race. Under Australia's federal system, each state or territory has responsibility for criminal justice in their jurisdiction. Those held in prison custody (including institutions such as remand) are the responsibility of a state or territory department overseeing correctional services; youth detention centres are overseen by a variety of types of departments (such as human/community services or youth justice), and those occurring in police custody during operations are the responsibility of each state or territory's police force, or alternatively the Australian Federal Police.

In 2013-2015, there were 149 deaths in custody in Australia, The majority of prisoners who died in prison and police custody were male, over 40 years of age and non-Indigenous.

The Australian Institute of Criminology (AIC) uses data from its National Deaths in Custody Program (NDICP), as laid out in Recommendation 41 of the final report of the RCIADIC. (Where other sources for the statistics quoted below vary from the RCIADIC definition given above, or need further clarification, this is noted.)

=== Historical ===
1980–1989: The National Report (1991) of the Royal Commission into Aboriginal Deaths in Custody (RCIADIC) included a list of the deaths investigated by the commission, i.e. those occurring between 1980 and 1989.

1989–1996: A 1996 report prepared by prepared for the Aboriginal and Torres Strait Islander Commission reported 96 Aboriginal deaths in custody in the seven years following the period examined by the RCIADIC, with a peak of 22 in 1995. A change in the definition of a death in custody in 1989 meant that only deaths in institutional settings (such as on remand, in prisons and youth detention centres), rather than police pursuit, could be examined when comparing the figures between the Royal Commission and post-Royal Commission periods.

1990–1999: A report comparing the number and circumstances of Indigenous deaths in custody during the 10-year period examined by RCDIAC with those in the following 10 years, found that the average annual rate of deaths has decreased from 4.4 deaths per 100,000 persons to 3.8 deaths per 100,000 people. As a proportion of all deaths in custody, those of Indigenous people had decreased from 21% to 18%. As a proportion of all deaths in custody, deaths in police custody (all races) had decreased, while prison deaths had increased.

2001–2011: A 2013 Monitoring Report by the AIC found that both Indigenous and non-Indigenous rates of deaths in custody had decreased in the ten years preceding 2011, including eight years in which the Indigenous rate of deaths in prison had been lower than non-Indigenous. Looking at police custody, those in institutional and close contact settings had been decreasing (attributed to better training of police and design improvements in holding cells), while "operational deaths" (such as pursuits) had shown an overall increase since the early 1990s, but some reduction between 2003 and 2011.

2013–2015: In the two years between 1 July 2013 and 30 June 2015, there was a total of 115 deaths (of all races) in prison custody, with over 70% of these due to natural causes, and 34 in police custody and related operations. 22% of the prison deaths and 19% of those in police custody were of Indigenous people.

2015–2017: In a Statistical Report looking at prison deaths between 2015 and 2016, the AIC reported that death rates of Indigenous prisoners "[had] been consistently lower than death rates of non-Indigenous prisoners since 2003–04". The death rate in 2015–2016 was 0.18 and 0.23 per 100 respectively, and in 2016–2017, 0.14 and 0.18 per 100 respectively.

1979–2018: The AIC's National Deaths in Custody Program report: Deaths in custody in Australia 2013–14 and 2014–15, published in April 2018, reported a total of 2,608 deaths (of all races) in custody since 1979–80, with 1,600 deaths of those in prison and 985 in police custody. (In addition, 18 deaths had occurred in youth detention facilities and five in other justice facilities, but these were excluded from analysis in this report.) Of those 2,608 deaths, 500 had been Indigenous and 2,104 non-Indigenous people.

1990–2004: A report spanning 25 years summarised the trends in deaths during this period. Compared with the RDDIAC period (1980–1989), in which the majority of deaths (61%) occurred in police custody, during this 15-year period most of the deaths occurred in prison custody (63%). Deaths in police custody had decreased, while the number of deaths occurring during police operations increased, but the latter deaths were mostly of non-Indigenous persons. "While the number of deaths of non-Indigenous prisoners has consistently exceeded deaths of Indigenous prisoners, the rate of Indigenous prisoner deaths exceeded the rate of non-Indigenous prisoner deaths in just over half of the 15 years since RCIADIC, reflecting the general over-representation of Indigenous persons in the prison population."

1991–2016: A 2019 AIC Statistical Bulletin, looking at 25 years of data since the Royal Commission (1 July 1991 to 30 June 2016), found that:

- With reference to prison custody, "Indigenous people are now less likely than non-Indigenous people to die in prison custody" including a decrease in the rate of hanging deaths. Death from natural causes was the most prevalent cause, at 58% (140), followed by hanging, at 32% (78); 5% (12) were due to drugs and/or alcohol, and 4% (9) were due to external trauma. from mid-2003 to mid–2016, deaths due to natural causes surpassed hanging deaths. Deaths in prison custody had decreased overall for both Indigenous and non-Indigenous people.
- With reference to police custody, it was not possible to calculate rates of death due to lack of reliable data, but there was no clear trend over the reference period based on raw numbers. The number of deaths in police custody in each year was "relatively small", with a total of 146 Indigenous deaths over the 25-year period. The largest number occurred in 2002–03 and 2004–05 (11 each), and the lowest in 2013–14 (1). As to the manner of death, 47% (68) of Indigenous deaths in police custody were classified as accidental with 57% (39) of these during motor vehicle pursuits and 19% (13) during another type of pursuit. Natural causes accounted for 21% (31), self-inflicted deaths 19% (28), "justifiable homicide" 7% (10) and "unlawful homicide" 5% (8). 56% (82) of Indigenous deaths were classified as deaths in which officers were not in close contact, while the remaining 44% (64) were deaths in which officers were in close contact with the deceased. This proportion was reflected similarly in the stats for non-Indigenous deaths in police custody (333 and 262 respectively).

=== Recent totals and analyses ===
1991 – June 2020: A total of at least 437 Indigenous deaths in custody have been recorded since 1991.

2008 – June 2020: The Guardian's Deaths Inside database, tracking all Indigenous deaths in custody (Note: Click on "About the project" for full details of rationale and source of the data. "Up to date information about deaths in custody is hard to find... The information in this database is from published coronial findings. Where an inquest is yet to be held or findings yet to be published, the information is drawn from media reports, press statements from police or justice departments, and occasionally interviews with families. We have endeavoured to link to primary sources wherever possible.") between 1 January 2008 and 5 June 2020, (Note: "The database was originally published in August 2018. It was updated in August 2019 to include 17 further reports of Indigenous deaths in custody, some of which occurred in that 12-month period, and some which had only recently been subject to coronial findings. The data was updated again in June 2020 to include nine new reports of Indigenous deaths in custody, and new information for 14 existing cases".) was created by Guardian Australia reporters, using all available data available from coronial and other sources. It also includes all deaths that occurred in the presence of police officers, including those caused by self-inflicted injuries. It also includes deaths occurring during a police pursuit or traffic intercept by police.

The total number is of deaths recorded is 164, with Western Australia recording the highest number for a state or territory (54). Of the total, 72 deaths were attributed to medical issues; 23 to self-harm and 23 to traffic accidents. Further analysis of the data showed that agencies "failed to follow all of their own procedures in 41% of cases where Indigenous people died"; and in the cases of 38% of Indigenous deaths, required medical care at some point was not given. In 42% of all deaths in custody (all races), "mental health or cognitive impairment was a factor", but Indigenous people with a diagnosed mental condition, including brain injury and foetal alcohol syndrome, did not receive the required care in 49% of cases. Another finding was that Indigenous women fared worse than men in terms of receiving all appropriate medical care and the authorities following procedures.

July 2018 – June 2019: The AIC report published in December 2020 (the most recent as of April 2021) reports on deaths between July 2018 and June 2019. The data tables in Appendices B, C and D can be downloaded in Excel format. (See table below.)

== Responses ==
In Australia, all deaths in custody trigger an inquest. By August 2018 it was found that there had been a lack of action on recommendations arising from inquests, including the recommendations made as part of the 1987 Royal Commission into Aboriginal Deaths in Custody. Over half of the Indigenous people who died in custody since 2008 had not been found guilty, as 56% were on remand, died while fleeing police or during arrest, or were in protective custody. Most were suspected of non-indictable offences, which typically carry sentences of less than five years.

=== Custody Notification Scheme ===
Custody Notification Schemes (CNS) have been set up in several states and territories. Implementation of a CNS has been shown to bring about a dramatic reduction in the numbers of Aboriginal deaths in police custody. In October 2016, the federal government offered funding for the first three years to the remaining states and territories which had not yet legislated a mandatory CNS; by July 2020, only Queensland and Tasmania had not yet introduced such legislation.

== Publicity and community action ==
Since the murder of George Floyd and the protests that followed in the US in the first week of June 2020, Aboriginal deaths in custody have come into focus again. The last day of National Reconciliation Week was marked by a candlelight vigil in Brisbane's Musgrave Park on 3 June 2020, with 432 candles lit for each of the Aboriginal deaths in custody since the 1991 end of the Royal Commission into Aboriginal Deaths in Custody, and an extra one for George Floyd. Protests planned in major cities on 6 June 2020 were met with differing responses by government and police in each state, owing to the social distancing and other restrictions imposed during the COVID-19 pandemic in Australia.

== Closing the Gap ==
The federal government's Closing the Gap strategy since 2008, which aims to reduce disadvantage among Indigenous Australians, had not addressed justice issues during the first 10 years of its existence, but draft targets for 2019 created by the Council of Australian Governments (COAG) in December 2018 included one called "Justice (including youth justice)". This target aims to "Reduce the rate of Aboriginal and Torres Strait Islander young people in detention by 11–19% and adults held in incarceration by at least 5% by 2028", and the outcome of the target is that "Aboriginal and Torres Strait Islander people are not overrepresented in the criminal justice system". The new targets and an overhaul of the Closing the Gap framework were now being led by Indigenous people, with the project still under way as of February 2020, when the 12th Closing the Gap report was published.

The Minister for Indigenous Australians, the Hon. Ken Wyatt, said in early June 2020 that law reform alone cannot solve the justice problem: "We're working to address the factors that contribute to high incarceration rates". As one example, Wyatt cited the Western Australian law which includes imprisonment as a punishment for not paying a fine. One of the RCIDIAC recommendations for state governments had been to review the offence of "public drunkenness" as well as imprisonment for unpaid fines, as these played a large part in the number of Indigenous people in custody. The Victorian and Western Australian governments indicated these laws might soon be overturned, years after two women had died in custody in each state while being held for one of these reasons (Tanya Day and Ms Dhu), and WA effected the change on 17 June 2020.

Senator Patrick Dodson, one of the Commissioners on the RCIDIAC, said in parliament that for too long there had been "nice words" and "good intentions", but there had been a lack of "action and commitment" to keeping Indigenous people out of prison.

== Individual cases and findings ==
=== Notable incidents ===
- 1983: John Pat, a 16-year-old boy killed in Western Australia
- 1987: Kingsley Richard Dixon, a 19-year-old who died in Adelaide Gaol, one of two cases which sparked the Royal Commission
- 1987: James Lloyd Boney, who died in Brewarrina, New South Wales, leading to the Brewarrina riot
- 1989: David Gundy, who died aged 29 in Marrickville, Sydney, on 27 April 1989
- 2004: Mulrunji Doomadgee, on Great Palm Island, Queensland
- 2014: Ms Dhu, in South Hedland, Western Australia. Dhu was a 22 year old woman who called police to report her boyfriend for domestic violence. When police arrived, they arrested Dhu for overdue fines. Dhu had internal injuries inflicted by her boyfriend, and complained of pain. Police took her to a medical centre 3 times, on the third visit she died. In 2016 the Coroner's Inquest found police had subjected Dhu to "inhumane" treatment, her medical treatment was "deficient" and recommended that Western Australia stop imprisoning people for unpaid fines. In 2020, the Parliament of Western Australia responded by passing a law which stipulated only a Magistrate could order someone imprisoned for unpaid fines.
- 2015: Kumanjayi or Kwementyaye Langdon, known in life as Perry Jabanangka Langdon, (Note: In Warlpiri culture, the term Kumanjayi is used in place of the deceased's given name during a specified period of mourning. It is spelt this way around desert areas in the NT, but in other places may be spelt "Kwementyaye".) a Warlpiri artist whose work is held by the National Gallery of Victoria, died in custody on 21 May 2015 of heart failure in Darwin Watch House, around three hours after being detained under the "paperless arrest" powers for drinking alcohol in a dry zone in Darwin. There was a two-day inquest, which found that he had not been violent, and that while there had been "shortcomings" in the process, Langdon had received adequate care and supervision. The coroner was critical of the paperless arrest system, saying that it could lead to more deaths in custody, but the Northern Territory Government did not take action to repeal the section of the Liquor Act (NT) that allowed for it.
- 2015: David Dungay, who died aged 26 in Long Bay Hospital at Long Bay Correctional Centre in Sydney. Dungay had diabetes and guards had asked him to stop eating biscuits. He died after five guards entered his cell and held him down while he repeatedly yelled "I can't breathe" and a prison nurse injected him with sedatives. A coronial inquest in November 2019 found that none of the guards should face disciplinary action, saying that their "conduct was limited by systemic deficiencies in training", but the professional conduct of the nurse should be reviewed by the Nursing Board.
- 2016: Rebecca Maher, a Wiradjuri woman, found dead in Maitland, New South Wales police cell in July 2016, after being arrested for public intoxication. The coroner found that she would have survived if police had followed procedures. This was the first time an Aboriginal person had died in custody in NSW or the ACT since the Custody Notification Service was implemented. When Maher was taken into protective custody by police for being intoxicated, police were only obliged to call the CNS if an Indigenous person was taken into custody for an offence, not if they were detained as an intoxicated person, so they did not alert the CNS at the Aboriginal Legal Service (NSW/ACT). As a result of the coronial inquest into her death, in October 2019 the NSW government implemented a change to extend the CNS to cover police custody of intoxicated persons.
- 2016: Wayne Fella Morrison, a 29-year-old Wiradjuri, Kokatha and Wirangu man died in the Royal Adelaide Hospital on 26 September 2016, after being held at Yatala Labour Prison and put in the back of a transport van in the prone position, with a spit hood, cuffed by his ankles and wrists, and with eight prison guards inside. He was pulled from the back of the van unresponsive and taken to hospital, where he died three days later after his life support machine was switched off. Morrison's death sparked the first national Black Lives Matter protests for Aboriginal lives in October, 2016. The state ombudsman's report in September 2020 said that Morrison was failed by the Department for Correctional Services (DCS), and made 17 recommendations, including that the use of body-worn video cameras for prison officers should be mandatory. DCS adopted some of the recommendations, and formed an agreement with Aboriginal Legal Rights Movement whereby all Aboriginal prisoners admitted to the Adelaide Remand Centre are able to access to the Aboriginal Visitors Scheme. The use of spit hoods was banned in SA in September 2021 as a result of Morrison's family and supporters advocating for 'Fella's Bill' – a spit hood prohibition Bill, tabled by SA Best's Connie Bonaros MLC. After a 5-year long inquiry into Wayne Fella Morrison's death, and multiple delays, officers in the van maintained their right to protection against self-incrimination; their right to silence on what happened in the van. South Australia will soon be first state in Australia to ban spit hoods in law.
- 2017: Tane Chatfield, aged 22, at Tamworth Correctional Centre on 22 September 2017 In August 2020 it was found by the coroner that he had committed suicide, but she criticised the inadequate care that he was given by the senior nurse in the hour before his death.
- 2017: Tanya Day, a 55-year-old Yorta Yorta woman, fell into a coma in a police cell in Castlemaine in Victoria and later died in the Bendigo Base Hospital in December 2017. In April 2020 a coroner referred the case to prosecutors for further investigation, stating that her death was preventable. On 27 August 2020 Victoria Police announced that they would not be laying charges against any officers, after receiving advice from the Office of Public Prosecutions.
- 2018: Nathan Reynolds, a 36-year-old man, died in the last week of his four-month sentence after an asthma attack in the minimum-security John Morony Correctional Centre (now part of the Francis Greenway Correction Complex) in Sydney in September 2018. The coronial inquiry showed that the prison staff's response was "unreasonably delayed", and contributed to his death.
- 2019: Kumanjayi Walker, a 19-year-old Warlpiri man, was shot and killed while resisting arrest on 9 November 2019 in the remote community of Yuendumu, Northern Territory. His case drew national and international attention and media coverage after Constable Zachary Rolfe was charged with his murder soon afterwards, but was acquitted in March 2022.
- 2025: Linton Ryan, a 31-year old Noongar Wongai Adnyamathanha man with mental health problems, died in Eastern Goldfields Regional Prison in Kalgoorlie-Boulder, having spent three days there after being taken into custody for disorderly behaviour in town in April 2025. A police officer had dismissed his warning that he was going to take his own life. In September of that year, WA Police apologised to his family, saying that they would have to train new recruits better.
- 2025: Kumanjayi White, a 24-year-old Warlpiri man with cognitive disabilities, died after being restrained by police on the floor of the Coles supermarket in Alice Springs in May 2025. He had grown up in Yuendemu, but lived in supported accommodation in Alice Springs. Vigils were held across Australia after his grandfather, Ned Jampijinpa Hargraves, spoke out about the lack of information supplied to the family by police. A criminal investigation by police into his death was ongoing as of August 2025, and the family has started proceedings to sue the Northern Territory Government for assault, battery, and false imprisonment in the Federal Court. White was a cousin of Kumanjayi Walker.

== Tables ==
=== Deaths in prison custody 2019 table ===
Table B1 (2019) shows:

Table B1: Deaths in prison custody, 2018–19
	Indigenous		Non-Indigenous		Total	
	n	rate	n	rate	n	rate
Jurisdiction						
NSW	4	0.13	29	0.28	33	0.25
Vic	2	0.24	17	0.23	19	0.23
Qld	2	0.07	9	0.15	11	0.13
WA	5	0.19	10	0.24	15	0.22
SA	0	0.00	6	0.28	6	0.21
Tas	0	0.00	2	0.36	2	0.29
ACT	0	0.00	0	0.00	0	0.00
NT	3	0.21	0	0.00	3	0.17
Gender						
Male	16	0.15	71	0.25	87	0.22
Female	0	0.00	2	0.09	2	0.06
Age group (years)						
Less than 25	0	0.00	4	0.11	4	0.07
25–39	2	0.03	15	0.10	17	0.08
40–54	8	0.32	19	0.22	27	0.24
55+	6	1.85	35	1.12	41	1.19
Median (mean)	47 (49.1)		52 (51.9)		49 (51.4)	
Legal status						
Sentenced	10	0.13	46	0.22	56	0.19
Unsentenced	5	0.12	27	0.27	32	0.23
Cause of death						
Natural causes	11	0.09	40	0.13	51	0.12
Hanging	1	0.01	14	0.04	15	0.03
External trauma	1	0.01	5	0.02	6	0.01
Alcohol/ drugs	0	0.00	2	0.01	2	<0.01
Other/multiple	0	0.00	1	<0.01	1	<0.01
Manner of death						
Natural causes	11	0.09	40	0.13	51	0.12
Self-inflicted	1	0.01	16	0.05	17	0.04
Unlawful homicide	1	0.01	4	0.01	5	0.01
Justifiable homicide	1	0.01	0	0.00	1	<0.01
Accident	0	0.00	0	0.00	0	0.00
Most serious offence						
Violent	13	-	52	-	65	-
Theft-related	1	-	9	-	10	-
Drug-related	0	-	7	-	7	-
Good order	1	-	5	-	6	-
Traffic	1	-	0	-	1	-
Location of death						
Public hospital	7	-	18	-	25	-
Prison hospital	1	-	15	-	16	-
Cell	4	-	38	-	42	-
Other custodial setting	2	-	2	-	4	-
Private property	0	-	0	-	0	-
Public place	1	-	0	-	1	-
Other	1	-	0	-	1	-
Type of prison						
Private	3	-	15	-	18	0.21
Government	13	-	58	-	71	0.21
Total	16	0.13	73	0.23	89	0.21

== See also ==
- Age of criminal responsibility in Australia
- Closing the Gap, a government strategy aimed at reducing disadvantage among Indigenous people
- Custody Notification Scheme
- First Nations Deaths In Custody Watch Committee
- George Floyd protests in Australia
- Health effects of incarceration in Indigenous Australians
- Punishment in Australia
