= Custody Notification Service =

Hotline for Aboriginal Australians in custody

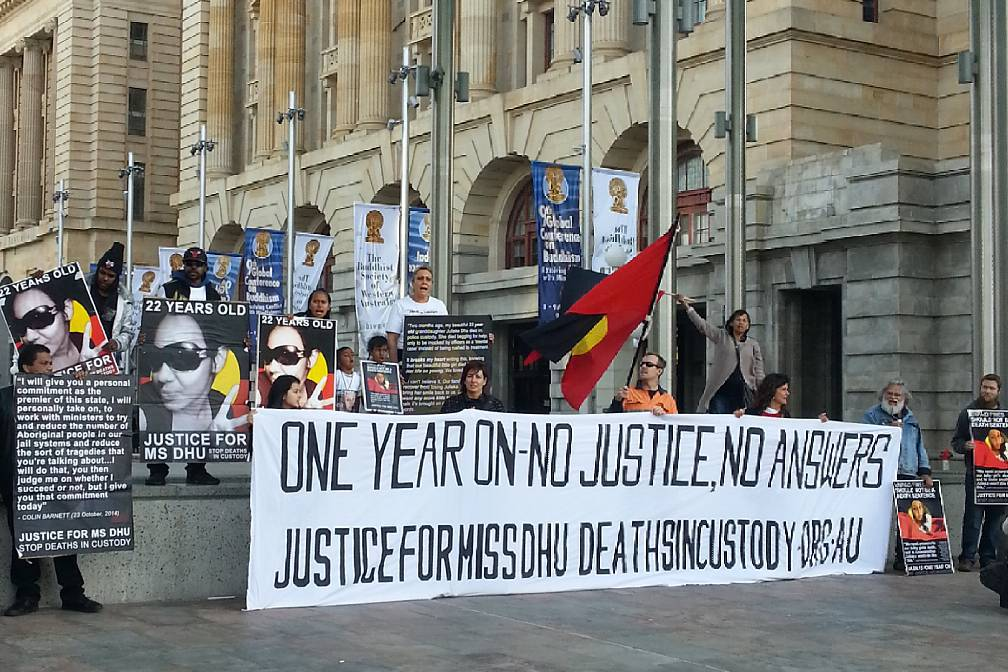
A protest calling for reform to prevent Aboriginal deaths in custody.

A Custody Notification Service (CNS), sometimes referred to as a Custody Notification Scheme, is a 24-hour legal advice and support telephone hotline for any Indigenous Australian person brought into custody, connecting them with lawyers from the Aboriginal legal service operating in their state or territory. It is intended to reduce the high number of Aboriginal deaths in custody by counteracting the effects of institutional racism. Legislation mandating the police to inform the legal service whenever an Aboriginal or Torres Strait Islander person is brought into custody is seen as essential to ensure compliance and a clear record of events. Where Custody Notification Services have been implemented, there have been reductions in the numbers of Aboriginal deaths in custody.

The implementation of a CNS in all Australian states and territories was recommendation no. 224 of the 339 recommendations of the 1991 Australian Royal Commission into Aboriginal Deaths in Custody report, but by 2018, only the Australian Capital Territory and New South Wales had such a service mandated by legislation. Many of the other states have followed, since the offer of three years of funding by the federal government in October 2016. As of July 2020, only Queensland and Tasmania do not have a legislated CNS in place.

== Background ==
The implementation of a CNS in all Australian states and territories was recommendation 224 of the 339 recommendations of the 1991 Australian Royal Commission into Aboriginal Deaths in Custody (RCIADIC), which had investigated 99 Aboriginal deaths in custody in the previous 10 years after community concerns were raised.

== Implementation ==
Most states and territories did not comply with the CNS recommendation for decades. About 340 Aboriginal people died in custody between the recommendation being made in 1991 and 2015. By 2019, over 400 Aboriginal people had died in custody, and by the end of 2021, the number of deaths had reached 500.

In October 2016, the then federal Minister for Indigenous Affairs, Nigel Scullion, said that federal funding would be provided for the first three years of a CNS service after a state had introduced the necessary legislation. In October 2017, the federal government again urged states and territories to implement a CNS.

The Attorney-General for Australia commissioned the Australian Law Reform Commission (ALRC) in October 2016 to examine the factors leading to the disproportionate numbers of Aboriginal and Torres Strait Islander peoples in Australian prisons, and to look at ways of reforming legislation which might ameliorate this "national tragedy". The result of this in-depth enquiry was a report titled Pathways to Justice – Inquiry into the Incarceration Rate of Aboriginal and Torres Strait Islander Peoples, which was received by the Attorney-General in December 2017 and tabled in Parliament on 28 March 2018. The report listed 13 recommendations, covering many aspects of the legal framework and police and justice procedures, including:

Recommendation 14–3: Commonwealth, state and territory governments should introduce a statutory requirement for police to contact an Aboriginal and Torres Strait Islander legal service, or equivalent service, as soon as possible after an Aboriginal and Torres Strait Islander person is detained in custody for any reason—including for protective reasons. A maximum period within which the notification must occur should be prescribed.

As of July 2020, Queensland and Tasmania had not yet introduced a legislated CNS.

=== 2000: ACT & NSW ===
The CNS serving the Australian Capital Territory (ACT) and New South Wales (NSW) was established in 2000, allowing access to a lawyer through the Aboriginal Legal Service. It is mandated under NSW law (cl. 37 of the Law Enforcement (Powers and Responsibilities) Regulation 2016) that officers must inform the CNS, but not in ACT. The service has been successful and has since been cited as a model. In 2016, one Aboriginal person died in custody in NSW; this was the first time an Aboriginal person had died in custody in NSW or the ACT since the CNSs were implemented. Police failed to notify the CNS, rather than there being any problem with the service itself. this was the first time an Aboriginal person had died in custody in NSW or the ACT since the CNSs were implemented. Police failed to notify the CNS when the law did not mandate it for the case in question, rather than there being any problem with the service itself. When 36-year-old Rebecca Maher was taken into protective custody by police for being intoxicated, under the provisions of Part 16 of the Law Enforcement (Powers and Responsibilities) Act 2002, police were only obliged to call the CNS if an Indigenous person was taken into custody for an offence, not if they were detained as an intoxicated person under this Act. As a result of the coronial inquest into her death, in October 2019 the NSW government implemented a change to extend the CNS to cover police custody of intoxicated persons.

=== 2018: Northern Territory ===
In 2018, the Northern Territory agreed to implement a CNS. The system attracted criticism for exempting protective custody and paperless arrests; for such arrests, police are not required to notify the CNS. There had previously been deaths in NT following exempted types of arrests. There are reports that the CNS legislation was substantially drafted by the police. Since January 2019, the CNS has been operated by the North Australian Aboriginal Justice Agency (NAAJA). An initial three years of funding was supplied by the federal government, with one more year promised in the 2022 budget. It had been agreed at the beginning that the Northern Territory Government would assume responsibility for funding the service at the end of the first three years, and that legislation would be enacted to protect the service, but this had not happened as of April 2022. In 2021, the CNS had assisted 8,000 Aboriginal people, of whom 750 were under the age of 18.

=== Oct 2019: Western Australia ===
In May 2016, a report recommended that Western Australia stop jailing people for unpaid fines. The report mentioned the death of Ms Dhu. The report was authored by Neil Morgan, Inspector of Custodial Services. The Western Australian government rejected the federal government's offer. In March 2017, Dhu's family criticised both the major political parties in Western Australia for not supporting such a scheme. The incumbent Liberal Party voiced their opposition to the program, while the Labor Party said they would consider the scheme though had made no commitments.

Attorney-General of Western Australia, John Quigley, supported such a program, saying "I think it [is] life-saving legislation. I'm sure if they took the late Ms Dhu into custody ... if the Aboriginal Legal Service [had] been contacted on day one it would have been a very different outcome". An online petition calling for the scheme was signed by almost 20,000 people in less than one week.

On 21 May 2018, it was announced that the WA state government had reconsidered the offer from the federal government to fund a CNS, and that the service would be operational by the end of the year. The Aboriginal Legal Service of Western Australia would operate the service. Funding negotiations held up the establishment of the service. In November 2018 it was announced the service would be operational in the first half of 2019. The service would cost $952,000 per year, with the Federal Government and State Government contributing $750,000 and $202,000 respectively. ALSWA would employ five lawyers and two support staff to run the service. The ALSWA commenced its CNS service on 2 October 2019. Under the Police Force Amendment Regulations 2019 (WA), Western Australia Police will be required to phone the CNS every time an Aboriginal person, child or adult, is detained in a police facility, regardless of the reason.

=== June 2020: Victoria ===
Victoria had some non-legislative CNS-like requirements in Victoria Police Manual’s instruction 113-1, with notifications are known as E* Justice Notifications. In 2018 a proposed law was being reviewed by the Victorian legislature.

On 13 June 2020 it was announced that the federal government would fund the Victorian Aboriginal Legal Service (VALS), which already provided an informal version, to deliver an expanded CNS service, after the Parliament of Victoria had passed new legislation. $2.1 million would be provided over three years to establish the service.

=== July 2020: South Australia ===
On 1 July 2020, the Attorney-General of South Australia, Vickie Chapman, announced that the state government would implement a formal CNS, after Aboriginal Affairs Labor spokesperson Kyam Maher had written to Premier Steven Marshall in June saying that he would introduce a Bill to parliament to legally mandate the service. This would legally require SAPOL to notify the Aboriginal Legal Rights Movement (ALRM) when an Aboriginal person enters custody. This had been done informally for some time, but the legal requirement would "help to ensure Aboriginal people receive culturally appropriate well-being support and basic legal advice as soon as possible after being taken into custody". Mandating the measure would also mean that if an officer refuses or fails to comply, they "may be subject to disciplinary proceedings" under the Police Complaints and Discipline Act 2016. The move was welcomed by ALRM, which had been lobbying for it for years. The Summary Offences (Custody Notification Service) Variation Regulations 2020 was gazetted on 2 July 2020.
