= Ros Fogliani =

Austrtalian coroner

Rosalinda Fogliani
- Born: 1962 or 1963 (age 63–64)
- Education: University of Western Australia
- Occupations: Barrister, solicitor, coroner
- Employer: Office of the Commonwealth Director of Public Prosecutions (1993–2011)
- Known for: First female State Coroner of Western Australia; Ms Dhu inquest
- Title: State Coroner of Western Australia

Rosalinda "Ros" Fogliani (born 1962 or 1963) is Western Australia's first female State Coroner.

Fogliani attended the University of Western Australia. In 1985, she was admitted as a barrister and solicitor of the Supreme Court of Western Australia. From 1993 to 2011, she was employed at the Office of the Commonwealth Director of Public Prosecutions. After returning to private practice as a barrister, Fogliani was appointed on 13 January 2014 as the first female State Coroner of Western Australia.

She is most known for her inquiry into the death of Ms Dhu, an Aboriginal Australian woman who died while in police custody in Western Australia in 2016. Her findings revealed that Dhu was subjected to inhumane police treatment. While Fogliani did not recommend police prosecution, she did request that the practice of jailing individuals for unpaid fines be ceased. Fogliani has continued to work on other high-profile cases. In 2019, she launched an inquest into the suicides of Indigenous children.

== See also ==
- List of first women lawyers and judges in Oceania
