= Elliott Johnston =

Australian judge

Elliott Frank Johnston AO QC (26 February 1918 – 25 August 2011) was an Australian jurist and communist activist. As a judge of the Supreme Court of South Australia (1983–1988), he was one of the few communists to serve as an Australian judge. He is also remembered as the second and final Commissioner of the Royal Commission into Aboriginal Deaths in Custody (1989–91).

== Early life and education ==
Johnston was born in North Adelaide to William Stewart and Elsie Vivian Johnston, and grew up in Kingston SE, studying first at public high schools and then Prince Alfred College on scholarship. He went on to study law at the University of Adelaide and after working at the Povey Waterhouse law firm while a student, he was immediately offered employment. He became secretary of the pacifist University Peace Group in 1937 and in 1940 established the Radical Club, which was banned within a month.

== Career ==
In 1940, despite his pacifist leanings, he enlisted in the army; he served in New Guinea from 1943 to 1945 and returned a lieutenant.

Shortly after his return from the War, he opened his own law office called Johnston Withers Lawyers. He had married Elizabeth Teesdale Smith, a fellow university radical, on 17 April 1942.

Johnston had joined the Communist Party of Australia in 1941. He attended the Sheffield Peace Congress in Warsaw in 1950 and then embarked on a brief tour of Moscow and Leningrad, which resulted in the cancellation of his passport. In 1951, he gave up his practice to work full-time as a communist organiser, and in 1954, he was elected to the South Australian state committee of the party. He studied in China from August 1955 to February 1957, and in July 1957, he returned to the law. Johnston disapproved of the excesses of both Stalinist and Maoist communism but remained committed to the ideal; he was put forward as Queen's Counsel (QC) in 1969 but was rejected on political grounds. The following year, following the Hall Government's defeat by Don Dunstan's Labor Party, Johnston was appointed QC.

Throughout the 1970s and 1980s, Johnston's law firm, which he ran with his wife Elizabeth and their partner Robyn Layton, dealt with a variety of progressive causes as well representing nineteen trade unions. Johnston was also a member of the South Australian National Football League's principal council for many years.

=== Judgeship ===
He was appointed as a judge to the Supreme Court of South Australia in 1983, which necessitated his resignation from the Communist Party. He served on the bench until February 1988, when he retired at the age of seventy. He remained active, however, and was immediately appointed a member of the Royal Commission into Aboriginal Deaths in Custody, succeeding to the role of Commissioner in 1989 following Jim Muirhead's resignation.

== Personal life ==
Johnston died at Parkwynd Hospital in Adelaide in August 2011; a memorial service held at the University of Adelaide was attended by 650 people.
