= Australian Institute of Criminology =

Australian national research center

Agency overview
- Formed: 1973
- Employees: 18
- Parent department: Attorney-General's Department
- Website: aic.gov.au

The Australian Institute of Criminology (AIC) is Australia's national research and knowledge centre on crime and criminal justice. The Institute seeks to promote justice and reduce crime by undertaking and communicating evidence-based research to inform policy and practice.

The functions of the AIC include conducting criminological research; communicating the results of research; conducting or arranging conferences and seminars; and publishing material arising out of the AIC's work.

== Structure ==
An Australian Government agency, the AIC was established in 1973 and operates under the Criminology Research Act 1971. It is part of the Attorney-General's portfolio and accountable to the Attorney-General.

The AIC works closely with the Australian Criminal Intelligence Commission (ACIC). The chief executive officer of the ACIC is also the director of the AIC, and although an independent entity, AIC staff were transferred to the ACIC under a Machinery of Government process in 2015.

The Criminology Research Advisory Council, representing Commonwealth and state and territory justice agencies, is responsible for providing advice to the director of the AIC on strategic priorities for research and priorities for communicating research results. AIC research is also subject to ethical standards which are governed through the oversight of an ethics committee, in accordance with National Health and Medical Research Council requirements.

== Research ==
Undertaking research is the core function of the Australian Institute of Criminology. Research is conducted on a range of crime and criminal justice issues to provide timely, policy-relevant research to the Australian Government and other key stakeholders.

Research activities fall into two main categories: national monitoring programs on homicide, drug use, deaths in custody, and fraud against the Commonwealth; and projects on a range of crime and justice topics (see Publications below).

== Publications ==
The Australian Institute of Criminology has been a significant criminal justice publisher since the mid-1970s. Publications cover broad subject areas including violent crime, drugs, transnational and organised crime, financial crime, cybercrime, policing, crime prevention, corrections and the criminal justice system.

=== Current series ===
- Annual reports: AIC
- Research in practice
- Research reports (peer reviewed)
- Statistical bulletins
- Statistical reports
- Trends and issues in crime and criminal justice series (peer reviewed)

== JV Barry Library ==
Honouring Justice Sir John Vincent Barry, the distinguished Australian criminologist and jurist, the JV Barry Library is a major criminal justice information resource that provides services to stakeholders and supports the information needs of the institute's research programs. It produces the Australian Criminology database—CINCH, an index of Australian criminal justice information.

The JV Barry Library has the most comprehensive library-based collection in the field of criminology and criminal justice in Australia. The collection comprises approximately 90,000 catalogue records for books, serial titles, journal articles, annual reports and other report series.
