= Royal Commission into Aboriginal Deaths in Custody =

Australian Royal Commission that began in October 1987

The Royal Commission into Aboriginal Deaths in Custody (RCIADIC) (1987–1991), also known as the Muirhead Commission, was a Royal Commission appointed by the Australian Government in October 1987 to Federal Court judge James Henry Muirhead QC, to study and report upon the underlying social, cultural and legal issues behind the deaths in custody of Aboriginal and Torres Strait Islander people, in the light of the high level of such deaths in the 1980s.

== Background and history ==
The Royal Commission was established following public calls for an inquiry into the apparently high number of Aboriginal people who had died while in custody, whether during an arrest or while under police pursuit, in pre-trial remand or in prison or youth detention centre. A campaign was begun by Indigenous activists after the death of 16-year-old John Peter Pat who died in a police cell in 1983 but gathered steam when several other Indigenous detainees were found dead in their cells, in circumstances believed to be suspicious by their families. In July 1987 Helen Corbett, a representative of the National Committee to Defend Black Rights (CDBR) took their case to the United Nations, and it was shortly after this that the government acted on it.

Announced on 10 August 1987, the Commission was conducted under the Royal Commissions Act 1902 and various state and federal legislative instruments, such as Letters Patent, which governed its operation and the appointments and revocations of Commissioners. The Northern Territory issued its Letters Patent under its Commission of Inquiry (Deaths in Custody) Act 1987. The Commission was established on 16 October 1987, to inquire why so many Aboriginal Australians had died in custody, and to make recommendations as to how to prevent such deaths in the future.

== Terms of reference and appointments ==
The terms of reference for the inquiry was to inquire into and report on the deaths of Indigenous people in police or prison custody or in any other place of detention between 1 January 1980 and 31 May 1989. Initially, it was believed that there were about 44 such deaths to be investigated but later 99 deaths were identified. (Another 25 deaths were held to be outside the Commission’s mandate.) 63 of the deaths occurred while the person was in police custody. The original terms of reference limited the inquiry to looking at the individual circumstances of each death, but they were later expanded to include looking at any related underlying social, cultural and legal issues. Commissioner Muirhead said that his job entailed not just understanding how each person died, but why that person died.

The Commission was established on 16 October 1987. Federal Court judge James Henry Muirhead QC was appointed Chair of the Commission and initially was the sole Commissioner (leading to the Commission sometimes being referred to as the "Muirhead Commission"). At the time, the number of deaths to be investigated were believed to be about 44, but after it was discovered that there was a much larger number of deaths needing investigation, a further five commissioners were appointed: D.J. O'Dea; Hal Wootten AC, QC; L.F. Wyvill QC; Elliott Johnston QC; and Patrick Dodson. Wootten was a former judge of the Supreme Court of New South Wales; and Johnston was a judge of the Supreme Court of South Australia. Dodson was the only Indigenous Commissioner, but was not legally trained. Johnston replaced Muirhead as the national commissioner on 28 April 1989.

Aboriginal activist Rob Riley was appointed Head of the Aboriginal Issues Unit of the Commission until Ruby Hammond replaced him in 1990.

Among the 99 cases investigated by the Commission were the deaths of rugby player Eddie Murray in 1981 at the Wee Waa police station, and the death of John Pat, a 16-year-old Aboriginal boy, at Roebourne, Western Australia in 1983. Commissioner Johnston was critical of the lack of any disciplinary charges against the five officers implicated in the violent death of the Aboriginal boy, calling this "a most unsatisfactory state of affairs".

The Commission held public hearings and community meetings where deaths occurred, with the Commission conducting internal and commissioned research. It also received submissions from organisations and individuals, including family members of victims, and delivered issues papers (46, of which 21 were produced by the Commission's research unit).

The Commission's Interim Report was issued on 21 December 1988, and the Final Report in April 1991.

== Final report ==
The Commission's final report was published on the 15th of April 1991, and concluded that the 99 deaths investigated were not due to police violence:

"... the immediate causes of the deaths do not include foul play, in the sense of unlawful, deliberate killing of Aboriginal prisoners by police and prison officers. More than one-third of the deaths (37) were from disease; 30 were self-inflicted hangings; 23 were caused by other forms of external trauma, especially head injuries; and 9 were immediately associated with dangerous alcohol and other drug use. Indeed, heavy alcohol use was involved in some way in deaths in each of these categories. The chapter concludes that glaring deficiencies existed in the standard of care afforded to many of the deceased".

The report goes on to say that this "in no way diminishes the seriousness of the problem of Aboriginal deaths in custody, nor does it undermine the reasons for the establishment of the Royal Commission. Indeed, the finding that the life styles of the Aboriginal people who died in custody, along with the procedures adopted by custodians and others, are the central determinants of their deaths ...highlights the importance of the Royal Commission' s broad enquiry into the position of Aboriginal people in Australia today and the ways that Aboriginal people are handled by the police and criminal justice systems.

It found that the circumstances of each death were very varied (with 63 occurring in police custody, 33 in prison custody and 3 in juvenile detention), and one cannot point to a common thread of abuse, neglect or racism common to them. There were however facts relating to their Aboriginality which pertained to their being in custody and how they died. It found that "...there appeared to be little appreciation of and less dedication to the duty of care owed by custodial authorities and their officers to persons in custody. We found many system defects in relation to care, many failures to exercise proper care and in general a poor standard of care. In some cases the defects and failures were causally related to the deaths, in some cases they were not and in others it was open to debate...in many cases death was contributed to by system failures or absence of due care".

The Royal Commission reported that Aboriginal people in custody died at about the same rate as non-Aboriginal people in custody, but the rate at which they came into custody was much higher, in particular police custody, so the 99 deaths represent that over-representation. Aboriginal people's rate of imprisonment was much higher. The RCIADIC report identified child removal (later dubbed the Stolen Generations) as correlating highly with later likelihood of imprisonment.

Aboriginal disadvantage is considered: "By all the indicators...Aboriginal people are disadvantaged when compared with any other distinct group in Australian society and with the society as a whole". Factors such as the economic position, health indicators, housing, their access or lack of it to land and employment, education; and the part played by alcohol and other drugs are all discussed in the report.

=== Recommendations ===
In all, there were 339 recommendations made in the report, including:

- Imprisonment should only occur as a last resort;
- Medical assistance must be called where necessary;
- Better collaboration with Aboriginal communities;
- The initiation of a process of reconciliation between Aboriginal and non-Aboriginal Australians;
- Statistics and other information on Aboriginal and non-Aboriginal deaths in custody should be monitored nationally on an ongoing basis, by the Australian Institute of Criminology, with the count based on a specific definition (Recommendation no. 6);
- Every death in custody in the future, Aboriginal or non-Aboriginal, should be subject to "rigorous and accountable investigations and a comprehensive coronial inquiry", which had not been the case with some of the deaths identified for the Royal Commission.

== Legacy ==
A related issue, not investigated by the Commission, is the disproportionately high number of Indigenous Australians who come under some form of custody or who are imprisoned under the law. One of the outcomes of the Commission was the establishment of a National Deaths in Custody Monitoring and Research Program at the Australian Institute of Criminology.

The Council for Aboriginal Reconciliation was created by an Act of Parliament in September 1991.

The Royal Commission recommended that the offence of public drunkenness be abolished (recommendation 79). By a legislative change in February 2021, Victoria finally decriminalised the offence of being drunk in a public place with effect from 7 November 2023. Queensland will be the only state in Australia that will have a specific offence of public drunkenness.

== Later reviews and analyses ==
Many years after RCIADIC, problems persisted, and various criticisms have been made about the Commission. Some blame the lack of commitment by the various governments to properly implement its recommendations; others blame the Commission, saying it was too constrained by its mandate and so could not possibly have achieved the necessary reforms to tackle the marginalisation of Indigenous people.

An in-depth analysis of RCIADIC by Elena Marchetti, Senior Lecturer at Griffith Law School, published in 2005, concludes: "Despite its many flaws – including the fact that legalistic perspectives were generally privileged at the expense of the more non-orthodox points of view – the RCIADIC remains the most comprehensive investigation ever undertaken into the deep disadvantage experienced by Indigenous people as a result of colonisation".

A 2018 review by Deloitte commissioned in December 2017 by the then Indigenous Affairs Minister, Nigel Scullion, found that only 64% of the recommendations had been fully implemented, and the rate of imprisonment of Indigenous Australians had almost doubled during the 27 years since 1991. It reported that 14% were "mostly implemented", 16% were "partly implemented" and 6% not at all. It also found that monitoring of deaths in custody had decreased nationwide, and the quality of data on police custody was “an ongoing issue”. Prison safety had increased, but more staff were needed for mental and other health issues of Aboriginal prisoners. Regular in-cell checks, particularly in police watch houses, were still deficient in some jurisdictions. The 2021 paper "30 years on: Royal Commission into Aboriginal Deaths in Custody Recommendations Remain Unimplemented" by the Centre for Aboriginal Economic Policy Research at ANU reviewed the Deloittes report and argued that the scope and methodology of the Deloitte review "misrepresents governments’ responses to RCIADIC, and has the potential to misinform policy and practice responses to Aboriginal deaths in custody".

A 2019 study found that Indigenous people are less likely to die within custody than non-Indigneous people. Another study that reviewed quantitative data from 505 public coroner reports, also published in 2019, found that Indigenous people are 'significantly more likely to die in police custody than non-Indigenous people'.

As of 19 April 2021, in the 30 years since the tabling of the Commission report in 1991 there have been a further 474 Aboriginal deaths in custody.

== See also ==
- Aboriginal deaths in custody
- Royal Commission Appointed to Investigate, Report and Advise Upon Matters in Relation to the Condition and Treatment of Aborigines (WA, 1934)
- Deaths In Custody Watch Committee (WA) Inc
