= Justice and Equity Centre =

Community legal centre in Sydney, Australia

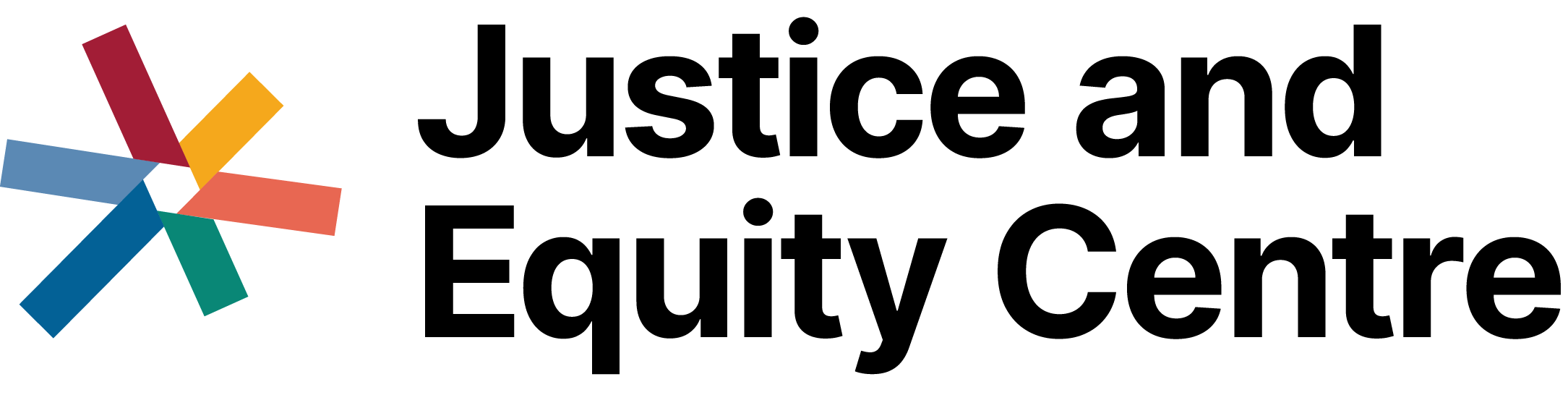
- Headquarters: Sydney, NSW, Australia
- Key people: Jonathon Hunyor, CEO
- Website: jec.org.au

The Justice and Equity Centre (JEC) is a specialist community legal centre based in Sydney, Australia. The JEC was founded in 1982 as the Public Interest Advocacy Centre (PIAC). It works with people and communities experiencing disadvantage, to challenge injustice and fight systemic inequity.

The JEC uses test cases and strategic litigation to challenge unfair laws and practices. These cases set precedents and produce legal principles that address disadvantage and inequity.

The JEC also undertakes research and policy development, and advocates for social justice outcomes through media, policy submissions, and engagement with decision-makers. The centre collaborates with partner organisations and civil society more broadly to promote social justice and systemic change.

== Areas of work ==
The JEC has five areas where it focuses its legal and policy advocacy:

- First Nations justice (including truth-telling)
- Disability rights
- Civil rights
- Homelessness (including the Homeless Persons’ Legal Service)
- Energy and water justice

== History ==
In 1981, the Law Foundation of NSW (now the Law and Justice Foundation) proposed the establishment of a new centre dedicated to public interest advocacy to the NSW Legal Aid Commission. Members of the steering committee created to oversee this centre's launch included Virginia Bell AC, then a solicitor at the Redfern Legal Centre and a Law Foundation board member, and John Maddison, a former NSW Attorney General. The steering committee's discussion paper floating the idea of a public interest centre received more than one hundred replies supporting the idea.

The centre was launched as the Public Interest Advocacy Centre (PIAC) in July 1982 by the then NSW Attorney General, Frank Walker QC, with Peter Cashman serving as PIAC's first Director. In an opening address, the Honourable Michael Kirby, as a Chairman of the Australian Law Reform Committee, forecast that the centre may ‘prove a valuable instrument for law reform especially within the courts’.

The centre initially focused on ‘public interest’ issues, including consumer rights and sex discrimination. Its work evolved to broader issues related to disadvantage, including First Nations justice, other areas of discrimination and government accountability.

The centre's name changed to the Justice and Equity Centre in 2024 to reflect its focus on social justice: making practical change to the lives of people experiencing disadvantage.

== Notable work ==
=== Public interest ===
==== Legal claims for victims of the Dalkon Shield ====
The JEC played a key role in advocating for Australian women harmed by the faulty Dalkon Shield contraceptive, an intra-uterine device that caused severe injuries, infections, and sometimes death. More than 100,000 Australian women were fitted with the device, which was removed from the U.S. market in 1973 but sold in Australia until 1980. The JEC began providing legal advice to victims in 1983, raising public awareness of the device's dangers and helping women file claims against the device's American marketers, A. H. Robins. Ultimately, the JEC filed more than 1,700 of the 6,000 claims filed by Australian women – the highest number of any country outside the U.S.

=== First Nations justice ===
==== Aboriginal Trust Repayment Scheme ====
The JEC worked with Aboriginal people and organisations to recover wages, allowances, and pensions withheld by the NSW Government for decades. Until 1969, employers deducted a significant portion of Aboriginal workers' wages, paying them to the Aboriginal Protection Board, and the funds were often never returned. By 2001, an estimated $69 million was owed to more than 10,000 Aboriginal people.

The JEC became involved in 2003, advocating for a repayment scheme and helping raise public awareness. In 2004, the NSW Government established the Aboriginal Trust Fund Repayment Scheme, leading to the reimbursement of 12.9 million from Aboriginal Trust Funds. The JEC provided legal support, worked to ensure fairer repayment processes, and successfully extended the scheme to allow more claims. However, many claimants passed away before receiving any compensation, and others were shortchanged due to inadequate payments and restrictive evidence requirements.

==== Truth-telling ====
In 2023, the JEC and the Indigenous Law Centre launched Towards Truth, a truth-telling website documenting how laws and government policies have impacted the lives of First Nations people. The project responds to the Uluru Statement's from the Heart call for truth-telling about Australian history.

The project's research is split into four broad themes: Kinship, Country, Law and Culture, and People. Subjects look at issues including child removals and Stolen Generations, wage theft, Aboriginal language suppression and revitalisation, and voting rights.

Towards Truth was conceived and founded by Professor Megan Davis, Professor Gabrielle Appleby, JEC CEO Jonathon Hunyor and Daniela Gavshon. The project is ongoing and continues to publish new research.

=== Disability Rights ===
==== Disability discrimination in schools ====
The JEC represented the parents of Scarlett Finney, a six-year-old girl with spina bifida, in a disability discrimination complaint against Hills Grammar School at the Human Rights and Equal Opportunity Commission(now the Australian Human Rights Commission (AHRC)). The school had rejected Scarlett, saying they could not accommodate her needs. In July 1999, Human Rights Commissioner Graeme Innes decided Hills Grammar had unlawfully discriminated against Scarlett, saying the school's approach was ‘based on assumptions’ of Scarlett's disability ‘which were either false or very general.’

The school appealed to the Federal Court, but the decision was upheld. Scarlett was awarded $42,628 in damages, including $37,628 for loss of educational opportunity (valued at the fees she would have paid) and $5000 for hurt and humiliation. This was the first test of the federal Disability Discrimination Act in relation to a private school. Counsel representing Scarlett were Stephen Gageler (later Chief Justice of the High Court of Australia) and Nicholas Poynder.

==== Maguire v Sydney Organising Committee for the Olympic Games ====
The JEC represented blind man Bruce Macguire in two complaints (see Maguire v Sydney Organising Committee for the Olympic Games, 1999 and Maguire v Sydney Organising Committee for the Olympic Games, 2000) against the Organising Committee for the at the Human Rights and Equal Opportunity Commission or HREOC (now the Australian Human Rights Commission (AHRC)).

In the first complaint, the Commission found the Committee had discriminated against Mr Macguire by refusing to make its ticket booking process accessible.

The second complaint related to the accessibility of the Sydney Olympics website. This was one of the first complaints worldwide to consider website accessibility and set a significant precedent. Soon after the Commission's decisions, the Australian Government required all agency websites to pass accessibility tests.

==== Accessible public transport ====
The JEC has led important legal actions to improve accessibility in public transport for people with disabilities. It represented Graeme Innes AM in a case against RailCorp, securing a 2013 judgment that led to more audible 'next stop' announcements on trains. In 2011, the JEC represented Greg Killeen, resulting in improved wheelchair-accessible taxis in NSW, and Julia Haraksin, who won a case against Murrays Australia Ltd, ensuring 55% of its bus fleet became wheelchair accessible. These cases have set important precedents for disability rights in transport.

==== Corcoran v Virgin Blue Airlines ====
In 2006, Virgin Blue (now Virgin Australia) changed their ‘Independent Travel Criteria’ policy so people who could not fasten their seatbelt, or put on an oxygen mask or lifejacket without assistance had to travel with a paying companion. This effectively doubled the price of travelling with Virgin for many people with disability. The JEC represented Maurice Corcoran, president of the Federation of Disability Organisations, and fellow passenger Tom Ferguson in cases at the Federal Court, after earlier disability discrimination complaints to the AHRC could not be resolved.

The JEC successfully secured a ‘cost cap’, allowing the case to proceed without significant financial risk for the applicants. In her judgement, Justice Annabelle Bennett said: ‘The ability of disabled persons to fly with Virgin, a major commercial airline in Australia, without the extra cost of a carer raises questions of public interest beyond the private interests of the applicant.’

In 2009, the complaints were resolved prior to hearing. Later that year, Virgin revised their policy, allowing people with disability to travel without having to pay for a companion.

=== Civil rights ===
==== Sex discrimination at Port Kembla Steelworks ====
A sex discrimination case for workers at Port Kembla Steelworks was a landmark legal battle and one of the largest and longest sex discrimination cases in Australian history. The JEC represented a group of women who filed an employment discrimination case against Australian Iron and Steel (AIS), the owner of Port Kembla Steelworks and a subsidiary of BHP, Australia's largest company at the time.

The women challenged AIS's discriminatory hiring practices, which had resulted in a disproportionately low number of female employees at the steelworks and meant many women were laid off when the steel industry experienced a downturn. This case was heard over 42 days throughout 1984 to 1986. The JEC legal team was led by Counsel John Basten (later a Justice of the New South Wales Court of Appeal). The outcome was pivotal in advancing equal employment opportunities for women in traditionally male-dominated industries.

==== Wilkie v Commonwealth ====
The JEC challenged the Commonwealth's 2017 postal survey on Australian marriage laws in the High Court of Australia. The JEC brought a case (Wilkie v Commonwealth) on behalf of Independent MP Andrew Wilkie; Melbourne mother and Rainbow Families advocate Felicity Marlowe; and PFLAG Brisbane spokesperson Shelley Argent. The High Court ultimately found that the Government's decision to hold and fund the postal vote on same-sex marriage without parliamentary approval was lawful.

=== Energy justice ===
==== Arthur Austin and Sydney County Council ====
The JEC's first major case was representing Arthur Austin, a retired electrician, to challenge unfair retrospective electricity price increases by Sydney County Council. Before the case went to trial, Premier Neville Wran announced the price hikes would be deferred, with the NSW Government soon after passing laws prohibiting retrospective charges. The Sydney Morning Herald credited the court challenge for ensuring the unfair charges were defeated.

==== Demand response ====
The JEC played a leading role in securing a demand response mechanism in Australia's energy network, calling for the reform in the Australian Competition and Consumer Commission’s (ACCC) Retail Electricity Price Inquiry, the Chief Scientist's Independent Review into the Future Security of the National Electricity Market (the Finkel Review), and the Australian Energy Market Commission’s (AEMC) Reliability Frameworks Review.

With the Australia Institute and Total Environment Centre, the JEC submitted a rule change proposal to the AEMC in 2018, proposing a demand response mechanism. In 2020, despite resistance from large energy businesses, the AEMC determined to introduce a wholesale demand response mechanism from 21 October 2021. This was a landmark development in Australian energy policy, marking a departure from market dominance by suppliers. For the first time that customers could be rewarded for reducing demand, in turn reducing the need for fossil fuel power generators.

=== Policing and detention ===
==== Deaths in Custody ====
The JEC has represented families of individuals who died in custody, highlighting systemic failures and driving reforms. One was the case of Scott Simpson, who died by suicide in 2004 after being denied psychiatric care in solitary confinement. The Coroner found significant medical neglect and made recommendations for improved treatment of mentally ill prisoners. In 2011, the JEC represented the family of Mark Holcroft, who died from a heart attack during transport between prisons. The Coroner identified several deficiencies, including lack of medical care and communication, leading to reforms such as better transport conditions and the installation of communication systems in prison vans. These cases spurred key policy changes in the NSW prison system.

==== False imprisonment class action ====
The JEC secured a $1.85 million settlement for over 50 young people who were wrongfully arrested by NSW Police due to inaccurate data in the Computerised Operational Policing System (COPS). Between 2007 and 2014, more than 100 young people were arrested based on outdated or incorrect bail conditions reflected in COPS, leading to unlawful arrests, strip searches, and overnight detentions.

The JEC began representing wrongfully arrested young people in 2009, eventually partnering with Maurice Blackburn to file a class action. After more than four years of litigation, the NSW Government settled, acknowledging the systemic failings in their policing practices. The case was a landmark victory, highlighting the misuse of COPS and the impact on vulnerable young people, including lead plaintiff Einpwy Amom, who was arrested multiple times due to incorrect data.

==== Suspect Target Management Plan ====
For more than a decade, NSW Police maintained a database of people deemed ‘likely to commit future crime’ called the Suspect Targeting Management Plan (STMP). People on the STMP received proactive attention from police, including repeated stops and searches and home visits. By 2022, the Law Enforcement Conduct Commission (LECC) found half of adults and 72% of young people on the STMP identified as ‘possibly’ Aboriginal or Torres Strait Islander.

In 2015, the JEC began working with the Aboriginal Legal Service (NSW / ACT) (ALS) on police harassment of Aboriginal young people. The JEC formed the Youth Justice Coalition with ALS, the Shopfront Youth Legal Centre, Redfern Legal Centre, and policing expert and academic, Dr Vicki Sentas, to scrutinise the STMP.

The Youth Justice Coalition released a report into the STMP in 2017, attracting significant media coverage and leading to the LECC launching ‘Operation Tepito’ to investigate use of the STMP by NSW Police.

In October 2023, Operation Tepito's final report was released, determining that use of the STMP ‘amounted to agency maladministration’ and ‘could possibly meet the threshold for serious misconduct’. By December, NSW Police stopped using the STMP.

=== Asylum seeker rights ===
==== Access to hepatitis C treatment in immigration detention ====
The JEC has advocated against indefinite immigration detention in Australia and for the rights of people in detention. In 2016, the JEC launched its Asylum Seeker Health Rights project.

One of its early campaigns was ensuring access to hepatitis C treatment for people in immigration detention. In 2018, the Centre filed proceedings in the Federal Court and made complaints to the Commonwealth Ombudsman seeking access to antiviral therapy for people detained. That same year, the JEC's In Poor Health report made recommendations for improving healthcare provision to people in immigration detention, including hepatitis C treatment.

In 2019, the Commonwealth Government committed to ensuring all detainees living with hepatitis C had access to antiviral medicine. However, barriers to accessing this medicine remained and the JEC represented another client in the Federal Court in March 2020, to request access to antiviral treatment. A month later, the client received the treatment.

==== Use of force in immigration detention ====
The JEC has challenged excessive use of force and handcuffing in immigration detention, highlighting the practice in submissions to the Commonwealth Joint Standing Committee on Migration.

After a complaint to the AHRC by asylum seeker Yasir (pseudonym) could not be resolved, the JEC took the case to the Federal Court. Yasir was being held in Australian immigration detention and had a history of trauma from being handcuffed and tortured in his birth country. If Yasir was handcuffed or threatened with being handcuffed, he experienced significant psychological and physical effects, including seizures.

Despite this, security staff from Serco (then contracted to operate Australia's immigration detention) regularly required Yasir to wear handcuffs to attend medical appointments. Yasir refused, so he could not access medical care and his health seriously suffered.

The JEC raised Yasir's case to the United Nations Subcommittee on the Prevention of Torture and other Cruel, Inhuman or Degrading Treatment or Punishment, ahead of a visit to Australia. In 2023, the Commonwealth and Serco settled with Yasir on confidential terms.

== People ==
=== JEC Directors / Chief Executive Officers ===
- Jonathon Hunyor 2016–Current
- Edward Santow 2010–2016
- Robin Banks 2004–2010
- Andrea Durbach 1997–2004
- Michael Hogan 1992–1997
- Pat Griffin 1990–1991
- Tony Simpson 1989–1990
- Roger West 1987–1989
- Peter Cashman 1982–1987

=== Chairs ===
- Sera Mirzabegian SC 2023–present
- Rebecca Gilsenan 2018–2023
- Ralph Pliner 2014–2018
- Peter Cashman (PIAC founding director) 2010–2014
- Shauna Jarrett 2007–2010
- Annette O'Neill 2004–2007
- Elizabeth Evatt 2000–2004
- Julian Disney 1998–2000
- Kevin O'Connor 1997–1998
- Larry Strange 1994–1997
- Chris Sidoti 1993–1994
- Danny Gilbert AM 1985–1993
- Anne Gorman 1982–1985

== Awards ==
- 2025 Mental Health Services Awards – general award for the Mental Health Housing Agreement 22 Lived Experience Committee
- 2023 Walking Together Award from AbSec
- 2017 Pro Bono Partnership Award nominee (with Allens) from the Law and Justice Foundation
- 2012 Children's Law Award from the National Children's and Youth Law Centre (now Youth Law Australia)
- 2010 Community Legal Centres NSW Award for the StreetCare advisory group
- 2009 Australian Privacy Awards, Community & NGO category – Highly Commended from the Office of the Privacy Commissioner
- 1999 Law Award from the Australian Human Rights Commission
- 1993 Human Rights Award from the Citizens Commission on Human Rights
