= Consumers' Federation of Australia =

Australia's umbrella consumer advocacy group

The Consumers' Federation of Australia (CFA) is Australia's umbrella consumer advocacy group.

As an organisation, CFA has over 30 organisational members ranging from large national organisations like CHOICE and COTA Australia to legal centres, financial counselling organisations, research institutions, and state-based consumer organisations. CFA is a full member of Consumers International, an international body for the world's consumer organisations.

CFA is an association incorporated in the Australian Capital Territory, and is registered as a charity with the Australian Charities and Not-for-profits Commission.

== History ==
In the early 1960s the Australian Consumers Association unsuccessfully attempted to establish state and territory branches. The first state or territory based consumer organisation was Canberra Consumers, established in 1963 by Michael Vernon, Godfrey Linge and Bill Howitt. By the late 1970s most states and territories had their own consumer group.

It soon became apparent that lack of coordinated action by these consumer lobby groups was obstructing political change. With the election of Gough Whitlam and the Labor Government in 1972, the Government encouraged the disparate consumer groups to join and form the Australian Federation of Consumer Organisations (AFCO).

In 1974 after a meeting of 27 consumer groups, led by the Australian Consumers' Association and Canberra Consumers, a constitution was drafted and AFCO was officially founded. AFCO's foundation membership included Canberra Consumers, the Country Women's Association, the Australian Consumers Association and the Consumer Action Movement. In 1994, for ease of reference, AFCO was renamed the Consumers' Federation of Australia (CFA).

During the 1980s and early 1990s, CFA had a nine-member staffing contingent based in Canberra. However, in 1996, the newly elected Howard Federal Government defunded the CFA. After the defunding decision, the CFA had only one part-time paid staff member. And after twelve months, the only staff members remaining were voluntary. CFA continues to operate to this day, but primarily as a voluntary organisation.

== Present ==
CFA's activities include supporting communication and networking among its members and consumer advocates; nominating and appointing consumer representatives to various boards, committees, and forums; and advocating on nationally important consumer issues.

=== Supporting members ===
CFA maintains a website that includes consumer news and updates from CFA members, regulators, and policymakers. It also regularly issues newsletters and hosts webinars for members.

In recent years, CFA has delivered a mentoring program, to support the professional development of consumer advocates. The goals of the mentoring program are to improve participant's effectiveness as a consumer advocate, and to facilitate a network of alumni who are well placed to take up consumer representative roles in the future.

=== Consumer representation ===
One way in which CFA advances the consumer interest is through nominating and supporting consumer representatives who sit on government, community and industry councils, boards and committees, where many of the decisions which affect consumers are made. CFA also provides consumer representatives to Standards Australia committees, which set safety and quality standards for product and services.

CFA co-chairs an annual consumer advocacy sector stakeholder meeting with the Consumer Senior Officials Network, which consists of the most relevant senior official from each of the Commonwealth Treasury, the Australian Competition & Consumer Commission, the Australian Securities & Investments Commission, and state, territory and New Zealand agencies responsible for consumer affairs.

=== Consumer advocacy ===
Given its limited resources, CFA does not actively engage in significant consumer advocacy but rather supports and amplifies the advocacy of its member organisations. CFA generally issues a policy agenda ahead of Federal Elections. In 2022, the CFA Policy Agenda called for the following strategic reforms:

· Appointing a Minister for Consumer Affairs, re-establishing a national Ministerial Council for Consumer Affairs and giving consumers a voice in national policy and regulatory reform.

· Enhance the Australian Consumer Law through an economy-side prohibition on unfair trading, a new general safety provision, and enacting penalties for consumer guarantees and unfair terms.

· Modernising travel consumer protection, including through a new Travel and Airline Ombudsman.

· Addressing scam losses through payment system reforms and a whole-of-government response.

· Regulating digital platforms to promote competitive outcomes and consumer protection.

· Targeting inflationary pressures through improving and expanding unit pricing.

· Renewing consumer credit laws to respond to market changes.

· Helping consumers transition to respond to climate change and sustainability.

=== Annual consumer advocacy award ===
CFA provides an annual award for the most impactful consumer advocacy campaign on project. The award is provided as part of the annual National Consumer Congress, hosted by the Australian Competition & Consumer Commission.

Recent award winners have been:

· 2023 – Save Sorry Business Campaign and Stop the Debt Trap Alliance (joint winners)[1]

· 2022 – The Save Safe Lending Campaign

· 2021 – Who is Making Australians Bankrupt? and Junk Insurance in Super (joint winners)[2]

· 2020 – Raphael Grzebieta from the Transport and Road Safety Research Centre for the Quad Bike Performance Project[3]

· 2019 – Financial Counselling Australia for the National Online Gambling Consumer Protection Framework[4]

· 2018 – Consumer Action Law Centre and Financial Rights Legal Centre for the Watch Your Nuts! campaign[5]

=== Other activities ===
CFA issues guidelines for the benefit of industry and regulatory schemes. For example, CFA has developed a set of good practice principles to offer guidance to industry bodies and external dispute resolution schemes about good practice in ensuring effective consumer input, including good practice in involving the consumer sector.

== Governance and management ==
CFA is governed by a 9-member executive committee made up of nominees of CFA members. The committee meets every two months to advance the work of the association and is supported by a part-time communications and administration officer.

The CFA Standards Project is managed by Consumer Action Law Centre, on behalf of CFA.

== Members ==
CFA's membership includes

=== National organisations ===
- Australian Communications Consumer Action Network
- Australian Motorcycle Council
- CHOICE
- COTA Australia
- Energy Consumers Australia
- Home Economics Institute of Australia
- Owners Corporation Network
- Super Consumers Australia

=== Legal centres ===
- Caxton Legal Centre
- Consumer Action Law Centre
- Consumer Credit Legal Service WA
- Darwin Community Legal Centre
- Financial Rights Legal Centre
- Hobart Community Legal Centre
- Justice and Equity Centre
- Westjustice

=== Financial counselling organisations ===
- Financial Counselling Australia
- CARE Inc
- Financial Counsellors' Association of NSW
- Indigenous Consumer Assistance Network
- Salvation Army MoneyCare

=== Research bodies ===
- Consumer Policy Research Centre

=== State-based bodies ===
- Combined Pensioners & Superannuants Association of NSW
- Consumers Association of South Australia
- Health Consumers' Council (WA)
- Public Transport Users Association
- Queensland Consumers Association
