= CCLS =

CCLS may refer to:

- Carver County Library System
- Central California Legal Services
- Centre for Commercial Law Studies
- Chattooga County Library System
- Chester County Library System
- Christ Community Lutheran School
- Clayton County Library System
- Coca Cola Light Sango
- Consumer Credit Legal Service (Western Australia)
