= Women's Domestic Violence Court Assistance Scheme =

The Women's Domestic Violence Court Assistance Scheme, commonly referred to by its initialism WDVCAS, comprises a network of organisations in New South Wales which information, advocacy and safety planning for women and their children who are escaping from or in danger of domestic violence. It is a key frontline support service. The Women's Domestic Violence Court Advocacy Service is the New South Wales Government organisation that provides funding and support for the WDVCASes, and ensures that they are operating according to their mandate. It was established in South Australia in July 2015.

== History ==
The Women's Domestic Violence Court Assistance Scheme (WDVCAS) was originally established by Redfern Legal Centre in March 1990 to provide a range of specialist legal and support services to women at court seeking apprehended violence orders (AVOs). The principles and guidelines of the Scheme required that it be operated by paid staff, who were to be women wherever practicable, and would provide a holistic service including court advocacy to those who were otherwise unrepresented. The model was firmly based on a feminist philosophy.

The scheme initially operated once a week on summons day (Wednesdays) at Redfern Local Court and involved a solicitor and two support workers providing service exclusively to women seeking AVOs. In addition to legal representation, WDVCAS staff assisted women with a range of needs: financial, housing, emotional support and counselling and other legal problems. The scheme co-ordinated assistance from a variety of services to provide women with the holistic support needed for them to attempt change. The scheme had the support of the local magistrate, Lillian Horler, and the court provided exclusive use of a room to minimise the risk of threats or intimidation within the environs of the court. With the assistance of the Chamber Magistrate Service, the WDVCAS were able to assist women bring many successful applications for their protection in circumstances where police had failed to act.

A comprehensive evaluation was conducted and launched by Justice Elizabeth Evatt in August 1991 and recorded the considerable success of the scheme in increasing the numbers of orders secured for the protection of women. The model, including the concept of a safe room, was subsequently expanded and adapted to the conditions and resources available at other local courts, not only in NSW but in other parts of Australia. By 1993 there were 21 community-based organisations participating in the scheme and WDVCASs were spreading quickly. There was also an increase in the use of the Chamber Magistrate Service to assist in drafting private applications in relation to domestic or personal violence, accounting for 25% of their work. This level of service was subsequently discontinued. The original WDVCAS service at Redfern Local Court was also brought to an end in 2004 with the winding down and closure of that courthouse, despite widespread protest.

In 1996 the Legal Aid Commission of NSW provided funding to the Women's Legal Resources Centre (now Women's Legal Service NSW) to provide training, resources and administrative support to the growing numbers of WDVCASs. However, administration of the WDVCAS scheme was subsequently taken over by Legal Aid NSW and the scheme renamed the Women's Domestic Violence Court Advocacy Service, still with the acronym WDVCAS. Demand for the service continued to grow but there was an ongoing struggle to secure adequate funding to meet the demand. By 2018, Legal Aid NSW was administering funding to 29 WDVCAS across the State of NSW operated by a variety of locally-based, incorporated, not-for-profit, NGOs. Service was being provided to women attending 117 Local Courts, with solicitors supplied through Legal Aid's Domestic Violence Practitioner Service.

A peak body, WDVCAS Inc. was established with funding from Legal Aid in 2011 (subsequently renamed Women's Safety NSW) and began to engage more closely with government agencies including the Department of the Attorney-General and Justice, NSW Victims Services, FACS and NSW Police. In 2015 the Safer Pathways program was introduced which involved WDVCAS working with a team of workers from NSW Police and other government agencies to hold regular Safety Action Meetings (SAM), chaired by police, with the purpose of sharing information and making plans in relation to women identified as being at "serious risk". A Domestic Violence Safety Assessment Tool (DVSAT) was developed for, and administered by police to identify the level of threat to domestic and family violence victims. A system was also introduced for police to refer every domestic violence incident to WDVCAS to provide a response within one working day. However, funding was not increased to meet the increased demand for WDVCAS services generated by this change. Research conducted by BOCSAR subsequently demonstrated that the DVSAT and the Safer Pathway program were ineffective. An evaluation commissioned by government also documented a reluctance to engage in the Safer Pathways program, particularly within the Aboriginal community, due to the involvement of the police. Legal Aid NSW and others have documented that inadequate responses by NSW Police, including an increasing number of women being inappropriately identified as defendants in relation to domestic violence matters, continues to act as a deterrent for women seeking help.

In 2018 the WDVCASes around the state were put out to tender by the NSW Attorney General, Mark Speakman, in a manner similar to that used to dismantle the underpinnings of the NSW Women's Refuge Movement. This move by government caused concern throughout the sector and saw Redfern Legal Centre bow out of the process. The tender process was abruptly cancelled part way but was re-instituted for many of the services in 2020 following re-election of the NSW Liberal Government.

== Women's Domestic Violence Court Advocacy Service ==
The Women's Domestic Violence Court Advocacy Service is the New South Wales Government organisation that provides funding and support for the WDVCASes, and ensures that they are operating according to their mandate. It operates safe rooms in courts and free legal advocacy and support services to women seeking protection orders in relation to domestic violence.

== South Australia ==
The Women's Domestic Violence Court Assistance Service (WDVCAS) was established in South Australia in July 2015, as a response to the inquest into the murder of Zahra Abrahimzadeh at the hands of her estranged husband in Adelaide in 2010. Funded for two years by the victims of crime levy, the services provide information, legal advice, support and representation relating to intervention order. The service is accessible via victim support services in Adelaide, Port Lincoln, Mount Gambier, Whyalla, Port Augusta, Port Pirie and Berri. The service won the 2021 Law Society of South Australia Justice Award, and continues to operate.

== See also ==
- Domestic violence in Australia
