= Good behaviour bond =

Type of non-custodial sentence in the Australian legal system

In the Australian legal system, a good behaviour bond is a type of non-custodial sentence which involves the condition of the offender's "good behaviour" for a set period. The condition of "good behaviour" primarily requires the offender to obey the law, but may also include additional probation officer supervision, mandatory medical treatment or participation in rehabilitation, counselling and intervention programs. These imposed conditions are determined by state legislation and at the magistrate's discretion. A good behaviour bond may be established with or without a recorded legal conviction for the offence. The specific conditions which constitute a good behaviour bond, as well as the consequences for breaching them, vary under each Australian state or territory's legislation, but overall are used most commonly for first-time and juvenile offenders.

== Implementation in Australian states & territories ==
=== New South Wales ===
The Crimes (Sentencing Procedure) Act 1999 (NSW) specifies the requirements of a good behaviour bond in New South Wales. Section 101(1)(a) declares the eradication of the courts' power to impose a "recognisance to be of good behaviour". The official Hansard record of 30 November 1999 clarifies that both "bond" and "recognisance" are terms which entail "the release of an offender upon probation", thus Section 101 intends to clarify terminology use. The Crimes (Sentencing Procedure) Act states that a good behaviour bond under Section 9 replaces imprisonment even if it forms a valid option, but cannot exceed a term of 5 years. Section 10 considers the "extenuating circumstances" of an offence, as well as the importance of expediency, and is exercised when determined that any other form of punishment would be ineffective. Section 12 guides the imposition of a good behaviour bond for an offender sentenced to less than 2 years' imprisonment. The sentence is suspended on the condition of the offender adhering to the good behavior bond.

=== Queensland ===
In Queensland, the relevant act for good behaviour bonds is the Penalties and Sentences Act 1992 (Qld). Section 19(1)(b) states that "The court may make an order that the offender be released...on the conditions that the offender must be of good behaviour and appear for conviction and sentence if called on at any time during such period". The good behaviour bond is also incorporated in Division 3 of the Act, which details the procedures of offenders who are released upon entering into "recognisance". Under this division, Sections 30(1)(a), 31 and 32(1)(b) describe the implied condition of good behaviour for a period of 1 year or less when the convicted individual "enters into a recognisance, with or without sureties".

=== Victoria ===
With the abolition of "common law bonds" in Section 71, the Victorian courts instead refer to "adjourned undertakings" through the Sentencing Act 1991 (Vic). The concept of good behaviour bonds is reflected in Section 72, which allows the court to delay proceedings for the convicted offender for a maximum time frame of 5 years. The offender is required to be "of good behaviour during the period of the adjournment", thus retaining the concept of good behaviour bonds despite the formal abolition. During the period of the adjourned undertaking, the offender may also be required to undergo medical treatment according to their doctor or treatment professional's advice. The court may ask for evidence of compliance through the provision of a doctor's letter or other proof of attendance. Furthermore, under Victorian state law, when the Court has imposed a good behaviour bond upon a young offender ("child"), it is stated that the child's charge must be dismissed if all conditions of the bond have been upheld during the set period.

=== Northern Territory ===
Courts in the Northern Territory rely upon the Sentencing Act 1995 (NT), which parallels Victorian legislation in its abolition of common law bonds at Section 124. However, Section 11(1)(b) states that once proven guilty, an offender may be released without a formal conviction, with the condition of good behaviour. This "good behaviour" condition is also described in Section 115(2)(a) of Part 10, with which the Administrator (referring to the representative of the Crown) may exercise a "prerogative of mercy" in releasing an offender. Therefore, despite the indicated removal of bonds, in practice the Sentencing Act still grants magistrates the ability to hold offenders accountable for their behaviour upon conditional release.

=== South Australia ===
The Sentencing Act 2017 (SA) is referred to by South Australian magistrates when imposing a good behaviour bond. Good behaviour is imposed as a general condition in Sections 72(1)(b) and 82(1)(a) for periodic detention and intensive correction orders respectively. The concept of a "good behaviour bond" is then described specifically in Section 97, which describes the "discharge of...defendants on entering into good behaviour bond." An additional condition is clarified at subsection (3), which explicitly states the prohibition of seeking "fresh prosecution" against an offender, unless they have acted against the bond's requirements. The Legal Services Commission of South Australia clarifies that a good behaviour may be imposed both as a "standalone penalty", as well as the condition for an offender's suspended imprisonment sentence.

=== Western Australia ===
In Western Australia, the Sentencing Act 1995 (WA) details the required circumstances of an offence for a good behaviour bond to apply. In similar fashion to both legislation in Victoria and the Northern Territory, Section 12 of the Act states the abolition of the requirement for offenders to "enter into a bond...to be of good behaviour or keep the peace" under common law. The requirements of a "conditional release order" (CRO) are detailed in Part 7, with Section 49(1) enabling the court to "impose any requirements...it decides are necessary to secure the good behaviour of the offender". However, this is restrained at Section 66(3) with the description of "community based orders" (CBO), as subsection 3(b) states that the court's imposed requirements should not be considered before any community service or programme options.

=== Tasmania ===
The Sentencing Act 1997 is cited by the courts in Tasmania when determining whether good behaviour bonds are appropriate. In its description of general sentencing powers wielded by the courts, under Section 7(f) of Part 2, the Act states that an offender may or may not be convicted. Within either case, the court may choose to adjourn proceedings for up to 60 months. The good behaviour bond is formed by the offender "giving an undertaking", as similarly referred to in Victorian legislation. In the case of a released offender, Section 59(b) explicates the conditions of the undertaking described in 7(f), stating "that the offender must be of good behaviour during the period of adjournment". The Sentencing Advisory Council under the Tasmanian state government also clarifies that a good behaviour is defined as a type of "recognizance". The classification of a "good behaviour bond" constitutes both "types of Recognizance" within the scope of the Australian Bureau of Statistics.

=== Australian Capital Territory ===
The legislation applied to good behaviour bond imposition in the Australian Capital Territory is the Crimes (Sentencing) Act 2005. The Act provides the most substantial explanation of good behaviour bond requirements in comparison to the legislation of the other States and Territories. Throughout the whole of Chapter 6, referred to as "good behaviour orders", the Act defines the varying conditions and specific court responsibilities when imposing good behaviour bonds in terms of community service (Part 6.1) and rehabilitation orders (Part 6.2). Good behaviour orders are also defined under the Part 3.3 category of "Non-custodial sentences", where Section 13(3) clarifies that the order may entail one or more specific conditions (e.g. community service, rehabilitation or monetary reparations).

== Related law reform submissions & issues ==
The legal application of good behaviour bonds may be considered positively, due to research from the Australian Institute of Criminology (AIC) indicating that it may contribute to reduced rates of recidivism, as well as increased victim satisfaction with greater accountability for the offender. However, law reform submissions have been made surrounding the potential issues of good behaviour bonds.

The Parliament of Australia heard submissions from the Redfern Legal Centre (RLC) surrounding the over-policing of Indigenous Australian offenders who were given non-custodial sentences (i.e. good behaviour bonds). The policies which target these individuals, such as the New South Wales' Suspect Target Management Plan (STMP), were criticised by the RLC for their failure to distinguish between minor and major offences. The RLC claimed that this resulted in unjust treatment and the increased chance of re-offending or good behaviour bond breaches.

Under consideration of current sentencing options (Section 19), the Australian Law Reform Commission (ALRC) also reflected upon the process of implementing good behaviour bonds for young offenders from remote Indigenous Australian communities. The submission of the Oz Child Legal Service (OCLS) at 19.69 suggested that courts should take into account the offenders' varying perceptions of time when prescribing good behaviour bonds. The OCLS claimed that the given penalty should be achievable, and described in periods of time (e.g. school terms) which can be easily recognised by the offender.

== Relevant statistics ==
=== Non-custodial sentencing rates in Children's courts ===
In their 2017-18 analysis, the Australian Bureau of Statistics (ABS) found that "other non-custodial orders" was the most common type of sentencing in Children's Courts across Australian states and territories. This category was defined to include good behaviour bonds and recognisance orders, under which 53% (11,782) of defendants who were proven guilty received their sentence.

=== Experimental family and domestic violence (FDV) statistics ===
The ABS' 2017-18 key findings also revealed that non-custodial orders (including good behaviour bonds) were the most common type of sentencing for individuals found guilty of perpetrating family and domestic violence. The statistics showed that 72% (2,115) of courts imposed good behaviour bonds as an alternative to sentences of correctional custody, community work and monetary orders (i.e. fines or other financial reparations). The exception among the Australian states and territories was the Northern Territory, where sentences for "custody in a correctional institution" was most relied upon by the Magistrates' and Children's Courts.

=== Historical use of good behaviour bonds ===
The Australian Institute of Criminology (AIC) provided statistics regarding the imposition rates of good behaviour bonds in Australian courts, prior to the report's publication date of 2013. The AIC found that an approximate total of 77,940 individuals were placed under the obligations of a good behaviour bond in 2011, which combined with the number of "fully suspended sentences" to make up 15% of total sentences in adult courts in Australia.

=== Correlation between bond length and recidivism rates ===
Through the findings of their report, "Bonds, suspended sentences and reoffending: Does the length of the order matter?", the AIC claimed that "the instantaneous risk of reoffending [was] higher" for offenders who were given good behaviour bonds of longer time frames. The data utilised to generate this conclusion was taken from the Bureau of Crime Statistic and Research's Reoffending Database, which has acquired its data from 1994 in Australian courts. However, the AIC also stated that in reality, a longer bond correlated to an increased term before a new criminal offence was recorded. Specifically, the AIC's analysis of offenders convicted in the New South Wales' Local Court over a two-year period (2006–2008) revealed that bond lengths of 0 to 23 months resulted in an average of 737.4 days until the "first new offence" had occurred. Meanwhile, good behaviour bonds of greater length than 24 months corresponded to the averaged longer term of 782.9 days before the sentenced individual had reoffended.

=== Conditional discharge trends in state courts ===
The August 2016 issue of the Crime and Justice Bulletin, published by the NSW Bureau of Crime Statistics and Research (BOCSAR), examined trends of good behaviour bond sentencing in NSW local courts. The key claim identified the trend of good behaviour bonds (under Section 10(1)(b)) becoming increasingly common with a 8.4% increase (15.2% to 23.6%), as "one of the least severe penalties a court can impose on an offender". The BOCSAR identified assault, illicit substance use and traffic offences as some of the offences for which bonds were imposed between 2004 and 2015. It was acknowledged that reasons behind this trend were "unclear". However, BOCSAR stated that the increase could be attributed to the Australian legal system attempting to respond to financial concerns which were associated with other alternative sentence options (i.e. monetary fines).

== See also ==
- Mentioned as example under "Non-prison punishments | Community corrections" in Punishment in Australia
- In Canadian law, may be referred to as Peace bond
- Within jurisdictions of Wales, England and Hong Kong, may be referred to as binding over
