= Tom Worthington (computer programmer) =

Australian computer programmer (born 1957)

- Born: 3 February 1957 (age 69)
- Other names: Thomas
- Occupation: Computer professional
- Employer: Tomw Communications Pty Ltd
- Known for: Maguire v SOCOG 2000, Green computing

Thomas Worthington (born 3 February 1957) is an Australian computer programmer best known as an expert witness in the Maguire v SOCOG 2000 Olympic web accessibility case and teacher of Green computing.

He is known for his ICT policy work and on-line teaching.

== Projects ==
Worthington was President of the Australian Computer Society (ACS). He gave evidence opposing Internet censorship on behalf of the ACS to an Australian Senate committee hearing in the mid 1990s.

Worthington appeared as an expert witness in the case Maguire v SOCOG 2000 in the Human Rights and Equal Opportunity Commission, providing an analysis of the accessibility for the disabled of the Sydney 2000 Olympics web site

He is the author of ICT Sustainability: Assessment and Strategies for a Low Carbon Future, a free open access book of course notes for Green computing courses run by the Australian National University and Australian Computer Society.

In July 2013, Worthington established a new business and website "Higher Education Whisperer", to provide advice on vocational and university course design, learning, teaching and research.

== Academic achievements ==
Worthington undertook his computer programmer training in the Australian Public Service. He also completed a Certificate in Audio-Visual Video, Audio-Visual Video Production at the Canberra Institute of Technology in 1990. He was awarded a Graduate Certificate in Higher Education by The Australian National University and Certificate IV in Training and Assessment (TAE40110) from Canberra Institute of Technology (CIT) in 2013. He was awarded a Masters of Education in Distance Education by Athabasca University in February 2017.

Worthington has had research papers published on topics including e-learning for ICT sustainability and a proposal to combine the features of synchronous and asynchronous learning in one software package.

== Employment ==
Worthington is an Adjunct Lecturer in the Research School of Computer Science, College of Engineering and Computer Science at the Australian National University, where he teaches ICT Sustainability, the design of web sites and use of e-commerce systems. He is also a member of the ANU Energy Change Institute and the ANU Climate Change Institute. Previously he worked as a civilian public servant employed by the Australian Department of Defence in the Australian Defence Force Headquarters, writing Internet and web policy.

== Awards and honours ==
In May 1998, Computerworld magazine named Worthington as one of the most influential individuals in the Australian IT industry. In 1999 the Australian Computer Society elected Worthington a Fellow of the society for his contribution to public policy on the use of the Internet. He was later made an Honorary Life Member and Certified Professional. In 2010 Worthington was presented with the ACT ICT Educator of the Year 2010 Award for his work on sustainable computing education.
