= Renfrewshire Law Centre =

Renfrewshire Law Centre, or RLC, was a West Scottish local community-based non-For-Profit law centre that offered services to the people of Renfrewshire and surrounding areas of West Central Scotland, often free of charge.

== Overview ==
Established in 1998 as Paisley Law Centre, it relaunched in 2008 as Renfrewshire Law Centre. With its head office in Paisley, a large town forming part of the conurbation of Greater Glasgow, RLC had the largest geographical catchment area of any community law centre in Scotland, and took cases from Paisley, Renfrew, Johnstone, Bishopton, Bridge of Weir, Brookfield, Elderslie, Erskine, Houston, Howwood, Inchinnan, Kilbarchan, Langbank, Linwood, Lochwinnoch, as well as from other areas beyond Renfrewshire itself. The law centre closed in 2018.

== Mission ==
In common with other law centres, RLC aimed to reclaim justice for the people, rather than using the legal system for private profit. Operating under the banner of Meeting Unmet Legal Need, it aimed to put the law to work in tackling issues of social hardship in contentious matters like housing, homelessness, consumer affairs, employment disputes, community care and children's rights. RLC also engages in legal education through various means, such as a volunteer program and free seminars.

== Activities ==
As a member of the Scottish Association of Law Centres, RLC was a progressive law project, active in social welfare, human rights and public law. Constitutionally, it was a democratic organisation, inviting other local organisations to propose members for appointment to its board of directors, all volunteers, who represent the interests of the community and steer RLC's casework in accordance with local needs.

Other prominent law centres in Scotland include Castlemilk Law & Money Advice Centre, Dundee Law Centre, Drumchapel Law & Money Advice Centre, East End Law Centre, Ethnic Minorities Law Centre, Environmental Law Centre, Fife Law Centre, Govan Law Centre, and Legal Services Agency.
