= Women's Legal Services NSW =

- Founded: 1982
- Number of employees: 15-20
- Website: www.wlsnsw.org.au

The Women's Legal Service NSW (WLS NSW) formerly the Women's Legal Resource Centre, is an independent, non-aligned, non-profit organisation funded by the Australian Commonwealth and state governments. It is part of the Community Legal Centre Network. WLS NSW promotes access to justice, particularly for women who are disadvantaged by their social or economic circumstances.

== History ==
In 1982, a group of female legal activists founded Australia's first legal service for women. The Women's Legal Resources Centre (WLRC) was established to promote access to justice through the provision of legal services, law reform, and community legal education; particularly for women disadvantaged by social and economic circumstances.

In 1986, the Women's Legal Resources Centre recognised the need for a community legal centre dedicated solely to women experiencing domestic violence. The Domestic Violence Advocacy Service (DVAS) was established to provide advice, advocacy, information, and education, in addition to developing policy and working towards law reform. This service has since been re-named the Domestic Violence Legal Service.

Between 1995 and 1998, the Women's Legal Resources Centre established five Legal Outreach services across Western Sydney and in Wyong, enabling women to receive face-to-face legal advice in their local areas. Due to resource constraints the Campbelltown and Wyong services were discontinued in 2010.

In 1996, with the aid of Federal Government funding, the Women’s Legal Resources Centre formed the Indigenous Women’s Program (now called the Indigenous Women’s Legal Program). This program aims to improve the services offered to Aboriginal and Torres Strait Islander women, providing free legal advice, referrals to other community and legal organizations, training, and community workshops.

In 1996, the NSW Government, through the Legal Aid Commission of NSW, provided funding to set up a Training and Resource unit for the Women’s Domestic Violence Court Assistance Program. This unit provides training and resources to Women’s Domestic Violence Court Assistance Schemes (WDVCAS) throughout NSW (now called Women’s Domestic Violence Court Advocacy Services) and administrative support and resources to the WDVCAS Network and is now provided by Legal Aid NSW.

As the Women's Legal Resources Centre (WLRC) grew and developed its diverse programs, the board of directors changed the name of the service to Women's Legal Services NSW in 2003, to better reflect the work of the organization.

Until 2010, Women's Legal Services NSW sponsored the Walgett and Bourke/Brewarrina Family Violence Prevention Legal Services (WFVPLS & BBFVPLS), which were funded by the Commonwealth Attorney General's Department. The Family Violence Prevention Legal Services aimed to facilitate community development in the prevention of family violence. The services combined legal resources with skills training, group and individual support, community education and advocacy. They are now under the auspices of Thiyama-li in Moree.

== Work ==
WLS NSW promotes women's human rights and social justice statewide. The organization:

- Provides free legal advice and assistance to women over the phone or in person, prioritizing those who are the most disadvantaged by their social and/or economic circumstances.
- Creates publications and runs training workshops, including free webinars (Ask LOIS) enabling community and support workers to successfully advocate for their clients.
- Pursues law and policy reforms in areas that affect women by writing submissions to government and other stakeholders.
- Offers specialised legal services and/or resources for Indigenous women, women from culturally and linguistically
  diverse communities and women in correctional facilities (the Legal Education and Advice in Prison program).

WLS NSW has a strong domestic violence focus, pioneering a trauma informed and qualitative approach to advice and advocacy for victims. Other major areas of practice include discrimination in employment (Working Women's Legal Services) family law, parenting issues, victims support and sexual assault.

== Ethos ==
WLSNSW works from a feminist perspective. Through casework, education, training and reform WLS NSW intends to promote legal and social change to redress the inequalities women experience.

== The Indigenous Women’s Legal Program (IWLP) ==
In 1996 with the aid of Federal Government funding, WLS NSW founded the Indigenous Women's Legal Program in consultation with Aboriginal women. The Indigenous Women's Legal Program is staffed by Aboriginal women and offers services including: free legal advice, assistance finding a lawyer, training and community workshops, resources and information about the law, face to face advice through outreach services and community legal education across NSW, including in Blackett, Campbelltown, Cranebrook, Emerton and Liverpool.

The aim of the IWLP is to provide services that best meet the needs of Aboriginal and Torres Strait Islander Women.

In 2000 Women's Legal Services (at that time the Women's Legal Resource Centre) received the Human Rights and Equal Opportunity Commission Law Award for its specialised Aboriginal women's services.

== Partnerships ==
WLS NSW has developed a number of partnerships in order to promote access to justice, including:

- Legal Education and Advice in Prison (LEAP): WLS NSW alongside Warringa Baiya Aboriginal Women's Legal Centre and Western Sydney Community Legal Centre provide civil and family law services to women, particularly Aboriginal women, who are incarcerated
- Women's Health Centre Advice Clinics: WLS solicitors give free legal advice from clinics in Blacktown, Liverpool and Penrith
- Family Relationships Centers Partnership: WLS NSW and the Western Sydney Community Legal Centre work together to provide legal advice clinics, some lawyer assisted family dispute resolution and professional development for Family Relationships Centre staff
- Bonnie’s Legal Outreach: A service for CALD women in south west Sydney, in collaboration with Bonnie's Women's Services

== Publications and resources ==
- A Practitioner’s Guide to Domestic Violence Law in NSW: A plain English guide to domestic violence law in NSW
- HELP! FaCS has removed my children
- Sexual Assault: Your rights and the law
- Ask LOIS – a secure website providing a free online legal information service for community workers across NSW who are working with women experiencing or escaping Domestic Violence, particularly targeted at regional and rural workers
- Women and Family law (10th ed, 2017)
- GP's Toolkit: "When she talks to you about the violence"(2014)
- Women's Legal Services brochure, in 10 community languages or in pictorials
- 10 Things you need to know when DoCS/FaCS removes your child
- A Long Way to Equal
- Our Silence is Abusing our Kids
- Our Dream: Stopping the Violence (3rd ed, 2015)
- Partnerships, Prevention and Rural Action III (Burrendong Report) 2007.
- Is This Love? A resource made for young women about healthy and unhealthy relationships'
