= Kingsford Legal Centre =

Australian not-for-profit legal centre

- Headquarters: Ground Floor, Law Building, The University of New South Wales, Kensington, Sydney, Australia
- No. of lawyers: 5 employed plus secondees, volunteers and interns
- No. of employees: 11
- Major practice areas: Clinical Legal Education, Community Legal Centre: Botany Bay LGA, Randwick LGA, employment law and discrimination law
- Key people: Associate Professor Anna Cody, Director
- Date founded: 1981
- Website: http://www.klc.unsw.edu.au/

Kingsford Legal Centre is an Australian not-for-profit legal centre. It is part of the network of Australian Community Legal Centres and also provides clinical legal education as part of the University of New South Wales Faculty of Law. It provides free advice to the residents of the Botany and Randwick local government areas, in subjects such as employment law, debts, victims compensation and domestic violence, as well as providing a statewide service for discrimination matters.

It is funded by the Legal Aid Commission of New South Wales and supported by Herbert Smith Freehills, and has won many awards and honours for its work.

== Description ==
Founded in 1981, Kingsford Legal Centre is a community legal centre, which also provides clinical legal education as part of the UNSW Faculty of Law.

It provides free advice, referrals and ongoing assistance to the residents of the Botany and Randwick council areas, in areas such as employment law, debts, victims' compensation and domestic violence, as well as a statewide service for discrimination matters. It takes on cases where there is no other source of assistance or where acting for the client will benefit the community by achieving change in the law or government policy.

== Funding and partnerships ==
Kingsford Legal Centre receives funding from the Community Legal Services Programme of the New South Wales Legal Aid Commission, the Commonwealth of Australia through the Attorney-General's Department (Commonwealth Community Legal Services Program, Clinical Legal Education and Family Law) and the University of New South Wales Faculty of Law.

It has a partnership with Herbert Smith Freehills who provide a solicitor on secondment for six months twice a year.

== International presence ==
Kingsford Legal Centre has appeared before the United Nations Human Rights Committee in New York and The Committee on Economic, Social and Cultural Rights of the United Nations Office at Geneva as an NGO.

== Publicised cases and advisings ==
In 1982, the centre was consulted by the Ethnic Communities' Council of New South Wales after the New South Wales Board of Senior School Studies made an error in the marking of the Higher School Certificate Modern Greek examination which had caused a number of students to miss out on their choice of university admissions.

The Centre took up Australia's first legal claim by a member of the stolen generation.

In 2002, Kingsford Legal Centre successfully represented a mother who had suffered workplace discrimination on the grounds of family responsibilities. This case was one a "series of legal victories by trailblazers" in 2002 which clarified the "law protecting working women's rights".

In 2003, Kingsford Legal Centre were instructing solicitors in a case before a Full Bench of the Australian Industrial Relations Commission which "strengthened the rights of thousands of workers who are labelled casuals, but who are effectively permanent part-time staff." A waitress who was engaged by an employer hotel as a casual employee was held to be a "regular and systematic" employee: casual employees were not entitled to sue for unfair dismissal under the then federal law but the ruling gave her, and a large number of persons in similar circumstances, access to redress for unfair dismissal.

== Awards and honours ==
The Kingsford Legal Centre, its staff and volunteers have won a number of awards and accorded various honours. These include:

- in October 2011, Michael Steinfeld won the Community Legal Centres NSW (CLCNSW) Award for his 27 years as a volunteer at the Centre
- in September 2011, Emma Golledge, Principal Solicitor, Kingsford Legal Centre was named the Woman Lawyer of the Year in a Community Organisation by the Women Lawyers' Association of New South Wales
- in March 2010, Merinda Dutton, a Teaching Assistant at the Kingsford Legal Centre, won a John Koowarta Reconciliation Law Scholarship
- in October 2007, Anna Cody, Director, Kingsford Legal Centre, was the recipient of the 2007 Government or Community Lawyer Award from the Women Lawyers' Association of New South Wales
- in 2001, the Kingsford Legal Centre team won the 2001 Australian Award for University Teaching for Law and Legal Studies sponsored by The Australian and funded by the federal Government to recognise outstanding efforts in university teaching
- In 1999 Frances Gibson was awarded the first Visiting Clinical Scholarship at New York University.
- in 1996, the volunteer lawyers, Kingsford Legal Centre were named co-winners for the Randwick district of the Herald Australia Day Awards for Community Service 1995

== Reality Bites: Street Practice ==
In 2004, the ABC broadcast a four-part television series, Reality Bites: Street Practice which followed a number of young law students undergoing their clinical legal experience at the Kingsford Legal Centre.

== Publications ==
The Kingsford Legal Centre publishes a number of information pamphlets describing its services and outlining key points of common legal advice, an e-Bulletin and other publications including:

- Clinical Legal Education Guide (to courses offered in Australian Universities), (2014, Kingsford Legal Centre, Sydney)
- Guide to Indigenous Legal Education (2nd ed. 2010, Kingsford Legal Centre, Sydney)
- David Nichols, From the Roundabout to the Roundhouse – 25 years of Kingsford Legal Centre, (2006, Kingsford Legal Centre, Sydney) ISBN 978-0-9775289-2-9
- Getting off the Referral Roundabout: Effective legal referral (DVD and workbook) (2006, Kingsford Legal Centre, Sydney) ISBN 978-0-9775289-1-2
- Discrimination Toolkit : Your Guide to Making a Discrimination Complaint, (2007, Elizabeth Evatt Community Legal Centre, Kingsford Legal Centre and Legal Aid Commission of New South Wales, Sydney) ISBN 978-0-646-47-262-1
