= Law centre =

Community legal advice centres in the UK

A law centre is a specific type of not-for-profit legal practice in the United Kingdom which provides legal aid to people otherwise not able to access commercial legal support. Law centres are independent and directly accountable to the communities they serve, usually through committees of local community members. The Law Centres Network (LCN) represents law centres in all levels of government.

Staffed by lawyers and caseworkers, law centres help people with civil legal problems such as eviction from their home, exploitation at work, discrimination and exclusion from school. They also seek to tackle the root causes of poverty and inequality in their communities.

"Law centre" is a registered trademark.

== History ==
The law centre movement began in the UK in the early 1970s, influenced by the growth of "neighbourhood law offices" in the United States legal aid had been available in the UK since 1949, but there were few legal practices in deprived areas and few lawyers who specialised in the areas of law most relevant to poor and disadvantaged people such as housing and welfare rights.

Law centres were set up to fill this gap. The first was North Kensington Law Centre (NKLC) which opened in London on 17 July 1970. By the end of the 1970s, there were 27 law centres in the UK. By the mid-1980s there were 54, most of which were in urban areas, and at their peak there were 60.

In February 2015, there were 44 law centres in England, Wales and Northern Ireland. The number of law centres and their services has been adversely affected by a series of funding cuts from central and local government. In particular, the removal of much of social welfare law from the scope of civil legal aid in the Legal Aid, Sentencing and Punishment of Offenders Act 2012 (LASPO) has led to the closure of ten law centres, leaving the rest struggling to meet increased demand.

The Law Centres Network estimated that between 2013 and 2017, law centres lost more than 60% of their legal aid income and more than 40% of total income, and 11 centres had to close, leaving only 45. The North Kensington Law Centre's total income dropped from £900,000 in 2010 to about £300,000 in 2017, and in that year it was overstretched trying to find funding to help victims of the Grenfell fire. By March 2019, eligibility for assistance by legal aid had dropped to under 25%, and it no longer covered most civil and family matters.

== Organisation and funding ==
"Law centre" is a trademarked name in the UK, and an entity may not call itself by this name unless it is a either full member of the Law Centres Network, or has received LCN's approval, based on a set of specific criteria. In England, Wales and Northern Ireland, law centres are members of the Law Centres Network (trading name of the Law Centres Federation). In Scotland, they are members of the Scottish Association of Law Centres.

Law centres rely on funding from legal aid contracts, local authority funding, and corporate and charitable donations.

== Work ==
Law centres specialise in the areas of civil law most relevant to disadvantaged communities. In the UK, these include community care, debt, discrimination, education, employment, housing, family, immigration and asylum, mental health, and welfare rights. Law centres offer specialist legal advice, casework and representation in these areas of law. They tailor their services to the needs of each person or group they help, and so often assist them with several legal problems at once.

Law centres help over 120,000 people every year with problems such as eviction, unfair dismissal, discrimination, violence, abuse, exploitation, and the wrongful withdrawal of their welfare benefits.

The Law Centres Federation commissioned research on the socio-economic value of law centres, which showed that for every £1 spent by law centres on a typical housing case, an estimated £10 of “social value” is created through benefits to the local community and savings to government. Other, non-quantifiable benefits are also yielded, like preventing case escalation, empowering individuals and preventing exclusion.

Law centres also seek to tackle the root causes of poverty and inequality. They do this by spotting trends in the needs of their communities and responding by raising awareness about legal rights, supporting community groups, and influencing policy locally and nationally.

When necessary, they mount national campaigns with their clients, such as "Justice for All", which defends access to justice. The campaign has featured in The Guardian.

Law centres also pursue test cases to the highest courts if necessary and do not hesitate to act unlawfully on a prevarication basis. For example, Sheffield Law Centre helped a young disabled man to win a case in the Court of Appeal in November 2009 which established that building works could be ordered under the Disability Discrimination Act 1995.

The Law Centres Network supports, develops and champions the law centres.

== Current UK Law Centres ==
=== England & Wales ===
- Avon and Bristol Law Centre
- Birmingham Community Law Centre
- Bradford Law Centre
- Brent Community Law Centre
- Bury Law Centre
- Cambridge House Law Centre
- Camden Community Law Centre
- Cardiff Law Centre
- Central London Law Centre
- Coventry Law Centre
- Croydon Law Centre (part of South West London Law Centre)
- Cumbria Law Centre
- Derby Citizens Advice and Law Centre
- Derbyshire Law Centre (formerly Chesterfield Law Centre)
- Ealing Law Centre
- Gloucester Law Centre
- Hackney Community Law Centre
- Hammersmith & Fulham Law Centre
- Haringey Law Centre
- Harrow Law Centre
- Hillingdon Law Centre
- Isle of Wight Law Centre
- Islington Law Centre
- Kingston & Richmond Law Centre (part of South West London Law Centre)
- Kirklees Law Centre
- Lambeth Law Centre
- Luton Law Centre
- Merton & Sutton Law Centre (part of South West London Law Centre)
- Newcastle Law Centre
- North Kensington Law Centre
- Nottingham Law Centre
- Paddington Law Centre
- Plumstead Community Law Centre
- Rochdale Law Centre
- Sheffield Citizens Advice and Law Centre
- South West London Law Centre
- Southwark Law Centre
- Springfield Law Centre
- Surrey Law Centre
- Tower Hamlets Law Centre
- Vauxhall Community Law and Information Centre
- Wandsworth Law Centre (part of South West London Law Centre)
- Wiltshire Law Centre

Anglia raskin University law clinic Cambridge

=== Scotland ===
- Castlemilk Law & Money Advice Centre
- CL@N Child Law Centre
- Drumchapel Law & Money Advice Centre
- Dundee Law Centre
- East End Community Law Centre
- Environmental Law Centre Scotland
- Ethnic Minorities Law Centre
- Govan Law Centre
- Govanhill Law Centre, Fife Law Centre
- Legal Services Agency
- Renfrewshire Law Centre (formerly Paisley Law Centre)

=== Northern Ireland ===
- Law Centre (Northern Ireland) - operating in Belfast and Derry

== See also ==
- Citizens Advice
- Community legal centre, the equivalent in Australia
- Community-based legal aid in the United States
