= Consumer Action Law Centre =

Australian consumer advocacy organisation

The Consumer Action Law Centre (CALC), also known as Consumer Action, is primarily a campaign-focused consumer advocacy organisation, but also acts as a community legal centre, providing free legal advice and pursuing litigation on behalf of vulnerable and disadvantaged consumers across Victoria, Australia. Based in Melbourne, it was formed in 2006 by the merger of the Consumer Law Centre Victoria and the Consumer Credit Legal Service and is funded jointly by Victoria Legal Aid and Consumer Affairs Victoria. Its mission is "just outcomes, for and with consumers". The organisation is national in its policy and advocacy work, while its services primarily service people residing in Victoria.

CALC pursues a law reform agenda across a range of consumer issues at a governmental level, in the media, and throughout the community directly. It is represented on a number of national and state-based regulators' consumer consultative committees, including the Australian Competition and Consumer Commission, the Australian Securities and Investments Commission and the Australian Energy Regulator as well as a range of government, industry and community sector working groups, boards, and consultative committees.

== Noteworthy casework and campaigns ==
=== Vocational education/VET FEE-HELP ===
The Centre played a leading role in uncovering the VET-FEE HELP scandals that plagued the vocational education sector in Australia from 2010-2016, with CEO Gerard Brody advising the Australian Government on reforms to the scandal plagued sector.

=== Do Not Knock ===
"Do Not Knock" was one of the Centre's most influential campaigns, providing Australians with stickers to halt the activities of door-to-door and unsolicited salespeople. The campaign led to a Federal Court of Australia ruling that found a "do not knock" sticker was a legally enforceable notice and meant significant fines for companies that ignored the notices.

=== Payday loans ===
The Centre has had long running campaigns against the payday lending industry, including a campaign to introduce a cap on the cost of payday loans and casework that led to a major industry player having to notify the Australian Securities Exchange.

=== Insurance ===
In 2016, the Centre launched "DemandARefund.com" a complaint letter generator and campaign to fight the selling of poor value Consumer Credit Insurance, Gap Insurance and Used Car Extended Warranties. The campaign followed similar scandals in the UK over Payment Protection Insurance with the Centre's own research showing Australians were being sold over $70m in "junk" Consumer Credit Insurance yearly. By September 2016, Australians had generated letters complaining about over $300,000 worth of policies.
