= Christ Community Lutheran School =

Location
- 110 West Woodbine Avenue; Kirkwood, MO 63122; United States
- Coordinates: 38°34′25″N 90°24′26″W

Information
- Established: 1973
- Enrollment: Approximately 650
- Colors: Red and White
- Mascot: Charger
- Website: ccls-stlouis.org

Christ Community Lutheran School or "CCLS" is a private, Lutheran school serving approximately 650 students ages 6 weeks–8th grade in the St. Louis area. Four campuses comprise Christ Community Lutheran School in the Crestwood, Glendale, Kirkwood, and Webster Groves areas. CCLS was named a 2009 Nationally Recognized Blue Ribbon School by the U.S. Department of Education. In 2018, CCLS was recognized as an Accredited Exemplary School by the National Lutheran School Accreditation Commission.

== History ==
CCLS was founded in 1973 with the assistance of five association congregations. These congregations include Concordia Lutheran Church, Glendale Lutheran Church, Mount Calvary Lutheran Church, Prince of Peace Lutheran Church, and the Lutheran Church of Webster Gardens. CCLS has been accredited through the Missouri Non-Public School Accrediting Association and the National Lutheran School Accreditation.

== Facilities and activities ==
Approximately 70% of CCLS' 40 teaching faculty hold advanced educational degrees. CCLS offers Spanish in grades K-8, a wireless laptop environment in grades 5-8, and a dedicated computer lab for grades K-4. There is a wide range of extra-curricular activities including: Academic Team, Ceramics Club, yearbook, band, handbells, Math Counts, drama, Destination ImagiNation and Student Leadership. Athletics are offered as early as kindergarten including: soccer (K-8), cross country (K-8), volleyball (5-8), basketball (K-8), and track (5-8).

== Missionary work ==
Students are involved in many service opportunities throughout the year. During the 2009-2010 school year, CCLS raised money to build a school in Uganda. With the help of CCLS in St. Louis, Christ Community Lutheran School-Uganda was created. CCLS Uganda serves the needs of 350 students from Kawete, a rural village. CCLS keeps a missional presence as part of the ongoing partnership. CCLS was ranked in the top 5 of the 2010 United Nations NGO Positive Peace Awards in the elementary and high school categories.

== Field trips ==
CCLS students have the opportunity to experience a variety of field trips every year. In addition to field trips, 6th-8th grade students participate in class trips. Class trips include Chicago, Illinois (8th grade), and different trips every year for 5-7th.
