= Maguire v Sydney Organising Committee for the Olympic Games (1999) =

Decision of the Australian Human Rights and Equal Opportunity Commission

Maguire v SOCOG 1999
- Court: Human Rights and Equal Opportunity Commission
- Full case name: Bruce Lindsay Maguire v Sydney organising Committee for the Olympic Games
- Decided: 18 October 1999
- Citation: HREOC Decision H99/115

Case history
- Subsequent action: Maguire v SOCOG 2000

Court membership
- Judges sitting: Hon William Carter QC, Commissioner

Case opinions
- *By failing to provide the ticket book to the complainant in braille, the respondent unlawfully discriminated against the complainant in breach of the Disability Discrimination Act 1992. *(Given practical difficulties in retrospectively providing the ticket book) ... that the respondent conference with the complainant and provide direct and individual assistance in applying for remaining tickets.

Maguire v SOCOG 1999 was a decision of the Australian Human Rights and Equal Opportunity Commission, which ruled on 18 October 1999 that a blind man had been directly discriminated against by the failure of a government agency to provide ticketing materials for the Sydney Olympic Games in braille.

The Commission held it was not reasonable for the agency to rely on alternatives such as telephone information lines or an assumption the respondent could have the materials read to him by another. The commission also held that the cost of providing materials in braille should be considered in the context of an agency's overall budget rather than an assessed cost-benefit of the number of potential users of that material.

== Background to the case ==
Bruce Lindsay Maguire (b 1957) a small business owner from Baulkham Hills, New South Wales, was born totally blind and without sight or light perception. On 31 May 1999 Maguire sought to purchase tickets for himself and his family for the Sydney Olympic Games. At the time tickets were only available via an application form in a ticket book issued by the Sydney Organising Committee for the Olympic Games (SOCOG).

Maguire initially tried to have the ticket book read aloud to him by his sister, but the level of detail and cross-referencing required in this process was onerous and the attempt was abandoned after several hours. Maguire then enquired about obtaining a braille version of the ticket book. SOCOG indicated a braille version would be published but this did not occur. On 7 June 1999 Maguire was contacted by SOCOG to advise that the book would not be printed in braille as the cost was considered too high given the likely small number of braille-literate users.

Maguire then lodged a complaint with the Human Rights and Equal Opportunity Commission, alleging direct discrimination against him personally, and indirect discrimination against those with vision impairment. The specific grounds for the complaint were:

- failure to provide braille copies of the information required to place orders for Olympic Games tickets;
- failure to provide braille copies of the Olympic Games souvenir programme; and
- failure to provide a web site accessible to Maguire.

In September 1999 this third ground for complaint was separated from the others and formed the basis for the standalone decision in Maguire v SOCOG 2000.

Prior to the matter being heard, SOCOG instituted a telephone helpline for ticketing enquiries by the visually impaired.

== Arguments ==
=== Jurisdiction of HREOC ===
SOCOG initially objected to the Commission hearing the complaint on jurisdictional grounds. SOCOG argued it was a government agency and not a trading corporation and therefore not captured by section 12 of the Disability Discrimination Act 1992. Instead, SOCOG argued the complaint should be heard by State disability tribunals.

On 24 September 1999 SOCOG withdrew its objection to the complaint being heard but indicated it may renew it should the matter proceed to the Federal Court. Commissioner William Carter maintained the commission was competent to hear the complaint but was not required to formally rule on the objection as it was withdrawn prior to hearing.

=== Direct discrimination ===
In failing to provide the ticket book in braille, the Commissioner found that SOCOG breached section 24 of the Act. SOCOG argued that the delivery of the information in the ticket book did not constitute the provision of services within the meaning of section 24. The Commissioner did not accept that argument as the services provided by SOCOG fell inside the definition stated in section 4, in which SOCOG was providing tickets to sessions at the 2000 Olympics where SOCOG cannot refuse as the terms of conditions for the tickets was the same for Maguire as for any sighted person and that the ticketing process was integral to gaining a ticket to attend and to enjoy the entertainment provided by SOCOG. In providing the ticket book in print and not in braille meant that Maguire was denied access to the ticket book, the consequential services provided by SOCOG and accordingly, Maguire was denied the opportunity to make a valid application for tickets to the Olympic games.

=== Less favourable treatment ===
The commissioner felt that unless Maguire could have access to the information in order to make a valid application, he was treated less favourably because of his blindness than a sighted person. SOCOG contested the charge of less favourable treatment by outlining that Maguire could have got a sighted person to read the document for him, and that Maguire had access to a phone helpline and to an electronic format of the booklet. The commissioner dismissed those arguments. Reading the booklet to Maguire would have meant an incomprehensible oral presentation of tabulations, a great feat of memory, a requirement to find a time of convenience and hours of explanations was considered by the commissioner to be treating Maguire less favourably than the sighted person who could access the material without assistance at his or her leisure, capable of referencing and cross-referencing from page to page and thereby ensuring the completion not only of a valid application complete with alternatives that reflected in all respect the final decided choices of That person. The commission raises the question as to how a person in the position of Maguire could acquire any primary information in the ticket book which could then be perfected or developed by the officer in the course of a telephone conversation. The dilemma indicated by the commissioner was that if the ticket book was produced in braille, Maguire would have not required the assistance of the helpline. The vital information in the ticket book was presented in tabular form in which the line of information scrolled off the right-hand edge of the screen, making it difficult for Maguire to comprehend when the material was presented in Braille form on the refreshable braille pad.

=== Unjustifiable hardship ===
SOCOG argued that the provision of the ticket book in braille was an unjustifiable hardship under section 24 (2). Using Section 24 and section 11 of DDA 1992, the commissioner found that despite the small proportion of blind persons in the community who use Braille, SOCOG had the financial capacity to bear the additional cost as the cost of 200 braille copies of the ticket book would be $17,250.00 in comparison to the ticket book printing and distribution expenditure noted in SOCOG's budget which was $7.18 million.

=== Indirect discrimination ===
The commissioner found that SOCOG in not providing the ticket book in braille treated Maguire less favourably than persons without the disability which is also a breach of section 6.

== Decision ==
After finding in favour of Maguire, under section 103(1)(b)(ii) of the act, the commissioner made a declaration that SOCOG provide to Maguire forthwith the second booklet and that prior to 8 October, that SOCOG consult and inform Maguire as best it can of the classes and sessions for which tickets remain available and assist him in making a valid application for the remaining tickets by 8 October 1999. Consequently, the commissioner made a further declaration that, if Maguire desire to engage in the final ticketing process and SOCOG is unable to provide Maguire with the third booklet in Braille by 23 October, SOCOG again consult with Maguire and inform and assist him in the same manner as described in the second declaration above.

== Bibliography ==
1. Bruce Lindsay Maguire v. Sydney Organising Committee for the Olympic Games (Respondent) H 99/115 (2000), 17 December 2007, Human Rights and Equal Opportunity Commission, last visited on Saturday 30 August 2008, 10:43pm, http://www.humanrights.gov.au/disability_rights/decisions/comdec/2000/DD000200.htm
2. DISABILITY DISCRIMINATION ACT 1992 25 August 2008, Australasian Legal Information Institute, last visited on Friday 29 August 2008, 6:37pm, http://www.austlii.edu.au/au/legis/cth/consol_act/dda1992264/
3. Maguire v Sydney Organising Committee for the Olympic Games [2000] FCA 1112 (3 August 2000), 11 August 2000, Federal Court of Australia, last visited on Friday 29 August 2008, 9:57pm, "http://www.austlii.edu.au/au/cases/cth/federal_ct/2000/1112.html"
4. The Law Report: 5 October 1999 - SOCOG and HREOC; Jaidyn Leske-Justice Denied?, 5 October 1999, ABC, last visited on Friday 29 August 2008, 9:14pm, "https://www.abc.net.au/rn/talks/8.30/lawrpt/stories/s57027.htm"
