= Consumer Credit Legal Service (Western Australia) =

Consumer Credit Legal Service (WA) Inc (CCLS) is a non-profit community legal centre in Western Australia For over thirty years, CCLS has provided legal advice and support to people for financial and consumer law matters. CCLS is a specialist Community Legal Centre offering a state-wide service (in Western Australia), with a particular focus on supporting people who may otherwise find it challenging to navigate legal matters.

== Telephone Advice Line ==
CCLS operates a free Telephone Advice Line (TAL) providing legal advice for financial and consumer law matters. The TAL is operated by volunteer penultimate and final year students, under the supervision of a solicitor. Volunteers are trained to identify referrals and provide telephone legal advice services. Utilising volunteers, increases capacity to answer calls, provide referrals, take instructions and deliver advice. Volunteers and CCLS derive benefit from this arrangement. The client contact, training and supervision that volunteers receive from specialist lawyers is a career catalyst for law students. Conversely, CCLS benefits from not only increasing the capacity of its TAL but also by maintaining a network with its alumni of future community and private lawyers.

CCLS also takes an active role in community legal education, law reform and policy issues affecting consumers.

== Areas of Practice ==
CCLS provides legal advice in the areas of credit, banking, and finance.

Complex issues, trends, matters of public interest and Priority Clients are identified through TAL for further legal assistance, dispute resolution and other representation. Case files are run by specialist solicitors through internal dispute resolution (IDR) departments and external dispute resolution (EDR) schemes, predominantly the Australian Financial Complaints Authority (AFCA). CCLS does not currently provide court representation and better outcomes can often be achieved through IDR and EDR. AFCA provides more accessible, timely, cost-effective and fair outcomes for clients who are vulnerable and experiencing disadvantage then going through a court or tribunal process.
