= Community legal centre =

Australian legal aid provider

A community legal centre (CLC) is the Australian term for an independent not-for-profit organisation providing legal aid services, that is, provision of assistance to people who are unable to afford legal representation and access to the court system. They provide legal advice and traditional casework for free, primarily funded by federal, state and local government. Working with clients who are mostly the most disadvantaged and vulnerable people in Australian society, they also work with other agencies to address related problems, including financial, social and health issues. Their functions may include campaigning for law reform and developing community education programs.

The peak body is Community Legal Centres Australia. CLCs are the equivalent of law centres in the UK and community law centres in New Zealand.

There are as of 2020 eight Aboriginal and Torres Strait Islander Legal Services (ATSILS), with similar characteristics to CLCs.

There are also eight Legal Aid Commissions (LACs), which are state and territory government agencies, such as Victoria Legal Aid, which administers Commonwealth and state government funding of CLCs.

== History ==
The Aboriginal Legal Service was founded in 1970 in Redfern, Sydney, to provide services to Aboriginal Australians, and was the first free legal service in Australia. CLCs were subsequently established in Victoria in the early 1970s and spread quite rapidly to other states and territories. Although from the outset they shared some similarities with the already established American "neighbourhood law offices" and British law centres, in their insistence upon effecting systemic change and their largely voluntary support base they had characteristics distinct from each. They grew out of broader concerns for social justice that gained momentum in the 1960s and which found expression in the anti-war and women's movements, Aboriginal rights campaigns, and other pushes for far-reaching social change in both the Australian and global contexts. However, CLCs are a unique expression of these social justice and protest movements and do not claim particular ties to any other campaigns. Throughout their history different CLCs have usually held common platforms in only general, rather than specific, terms.

When the first Victorian CLCs were established, they were often resisted by a legal establishment that was defensive about CLCs' criticisms of the elitism or inaccessibility of the legal professions, suspicious of CLCs' aims and methods, and concerned about protecting profits. However, soon after the Fraser government came to power in December 1975, some members of the wider legal profession had begun to acknowledge the importance of CLCs in improving the public's access to the law.

Throughout the 1980s and 1990s, CLCs consolidated their position in the Victorian and wider Australian legal landscape, forging ties with different government and legal organisations (such as various state legal aid commissions).

== Today ==
CLCs are independent, not-for-profit, community-based organisations providing a range of services to people in Australia, including people experiencing discrimination and disadvantage. As of 2020, there are about 180 CLCs. Community Legal Centres Australia is the umbrella organisation for eight state and territory CLC associations. While some CLCs have developed close links with others, centres, for the most part, serve their own particular geographic or special interest communities, such as family law and family violence, credit and debt, consumer law, social security, migration, tenancy law, discrimination, employment law and child protection. Some centres focus on providing services for particular segments of the population, such as women, refugees and asylum seekers, older persons, children and youth, people with disabilities or Aboriginal and Torres Strait Islander people.

Centres provide various legal services, including legal advice and traditional casework, to individuals at little or no cost, as well as undertaking early intervention and preventative strategies, such as community education and development in legal skills, and engaging in advocacy for policy and law reform. They emphasise the demystification of the law and the empowerment of communities in their relation to the law, particularly by encouraging communities to be involved in their activities.

They develop and facilitate partnerships between providers of legal assistance and legal and non-legal services (such as domestic violence organisations, community health organisations, housing services, drug and alcohol services). They may also undertake test case litigation, critique police powers and behaviours, and monitor prisons systems and conditions.

Equivalent services are provided in the UK by law centres and in New Zealand they are called community law centres.

=== Funding ===
Community legal centres are partly funded by a complex and variable mix of state and federal government monies, offered both directly (such as through grants) and indirectly. They are also funded by the proceeds of casework. However, they rely heavily upon the efforts and support of extensive volunteer networks, both lawyers and non-lawyers, to staff them without payment, without whom they would not survive.

Reviews of the National Partnership Agreement on Legal Assistance Services 2015-2020 (NPA) and the Indigenous Legal Assistance Program (ILAP) were undertaken in 2018. On 2 April 2019 the Attorney-General, Christian Porter, said that "guaranteeing stable and long-term funding certainty for legal services delivered by Legal Aid Commissions (LACs), Community Legal Centres (CLCs) and Aboriginal and Torres Strait Islander Legal Services (ATSILS) was part of the [Morrison] Government's plan for a stronger economy" and baseline funding would be increased from A$350.3 million in 2019–20 to A$370.0 million (indexed) ongoing from 1 July 2020. The announcement included plans for a single national mechanism to deliver legal assistance funding from 1 July 2020.

The 2018 reviews informed the National Legal Assistance Partnership (NLAP) 2020–25, which supports the "National Strategic Framework for Legal Assistance", published in 2019. This document outlines six guiding principles, and also states: "The principles of the National Strategic Framework should be applied consistently in a manner which supports self-determination and the National Partnership on Closing the Gap".

As of 2024 NLAP, a national partnership agreement between the Australian Government and all states and territories for all legal assistance funded by the federal government, provides funding for services delivered by: LACs, CLCs, and ATSILS. An independent review of NLAP has been undertaken, with the final review to be published on 29 February 2024.

== National CLCs ==
- Arts Law (formerly Arts Law Centre of Australia) is the only national community legal centre for the arts. It provides free or low-cost legal advice, education and resources to Australian artists and arts organisations on a wide range of arts-related legal and business matters. Its "Artists in the Black" program delivers services to Aboriginal and Torres Strait Islander artists across Australia.
- Environmental Defenders Office (EDO) is the largest environmental legal centre in the Australia-Pacific, founded in 1985. It provides free initial legal advice on planning and environmental law matters. and has offices in Adelaide, Cairns, Darwin, Hobart, Perth and Sydney.

== By state and territory ==
=== Australian Capital Territory ===
Community legal centres in the Australian Capital Territory include:

- The Aboriginal Legal Service (NSW/ACT), an ATSILS, was Australia's first free legal service when its first office was established in Redfern, Sydney, and it was also first to provide a Custody Notification Service in 2000.
- The Youth Law Centre (YLC) of Legal Aid ACT provides free legal advice to youth aged between 12 and 25. It provides advice on many areas some of which include family law, employment and apprenticeships, criminal law and traffic offences.
- Canberra Community Law provides free legal advice and representation on matters of social security and tenancy, street law and discrimination and disability law.
- The Women's Legal Centre provides services to women.

=== New South Wales ===
CLCs in New South Wales operate with the support of a peak body Community Legal Centres NSW (CLCNSW). As of 2025 there are 41 members of CLCNSW, including:

- The Justice and Equity Centre, founded in 1982 as the Public Interest Advocacy Centre, a strategic litigation and policy community legal centre based in central Sydney.
- The Kingsford Legal Centre has operated since 1981 at University of New South Wales, Kingsford as part of their Faculty of Law.
- Marrickville Legal Centre is a non-profit community legal centre based in south-west Sydney but serving the whole of NSW, established in 1979.
- The Redfern Legal Centre was the first Community Legal Centre in New South Wales and the second in Australia, established in March 1977.
- Seniors Rights Service provides free, confidential advocacy, advice, education and legal services to older people in New South Wales, including advice on retirement villages and strata living.
- The Tenants' Union of NSW was established in 1976 and is the peak non-government organisation representing the interests of tenants, including boarders, lodgers and other marginal tenants; Aboriginal tenants; public and community housing tenants and renters under other types of lease arrangements. It is the resourcing body for the statewide network of Tenants Advice and Advocacy Services (TAASs), and specialises in NSW residential tenancies law.
- Women's Legal Services NSW promotes women's human rights by providing free and confidential legal advice and referral, creating publications and running training workshops for community and support workers, and pursuing law and policy reform. The organisation specialises in domestic violence, family law, sexual assault and discrimination law.

The Aboriginal Legal Service (NSW/ACT) is an ATSILS, and operates separately from the above.

=== Northern Territory ===
CLCs serving the Northern Territory include:

- Central Australian Aboriginal Family Legal Unit (CAAFLU)
- Central Australian Women's Legal Service (CAWLS)
- The Darwin Community Legal Service (DCLS)
- Katherine Women's Information and Legal Service (KWILS)
- The North Australian Aboriginal Justice Agency (NAAJA) is the largest legal service in the Northern Territory, with offices in Darwin, Katherine Tennant Creek, Nhulunbuy and Alice Springs. It also operates the Custody Notification Service (since January 2019).
- The Top End Women's Legal Service (TEWLS) was founded in 1996, following a recommendation of the Australian Law Reform Commission (ALRC). It provides free legal advice, community legal education and advocacy on issues of importance to women across the Greater Darwin area.

=== Queensland ===
Queensland has a large number of CLCs, many of which provide services to their local area. Some of those which provide services statewide include:

- Basic Rights Queensland;
- Caxton Legal Centre;
- LawRight (formally known as QPILCH);
- LGBTI Legal Service provides legal services to members of the lesbian, gay, bisexual, trans and intersex community. It was officially launched in July 2010 by former Australian High Court Judge The Hon. Michael Kirby AC CMG;
- My Community Legal, Gold Coast;
- Prisoners' Legal Service.
- Refugee and Immigration Legal Service (RAILS);
- Tenants Queensland Inc.; and
- Women's Legal Service Queensland.

The peak body for CLCs in Queensland is Community Legal Centres Queensland (CLCQ).

=== South Australia ===
Community Legal Centres South Australian Inc. (CLCSA) is the peak body for all Community Legal Centres in South Australia. There is a network of centres which are allocated to different zones across the state, as well as specialist services which focus on areas such as homelessness, Aboriginal family violence, asylum seekers, women, consumer credit and other areas.

The Aboriginal Legal Rights Movement (ALRM), founded as the result of a grassroots movement in 1972, is an independent Aboriginal community-controlled organisation governed by an all-Aboriginal Board, which provides legal services as well as acting as an advocacy and lobby group for Aboriginal people across the state. It has also operated the state's Custody Notification Service informally for some time, but the change in law to make it compulsory for SAPOL to notify ALRM only took effect on 2 July 2020, after the Black Lives Matter protests had highlighted the issue of Aboriginal Deaths in Custody. The move was welcomed by ALRM, which had been lobbying for it for years. ALRM also represents families at coronial inquests and runs an Aboriginal Visitors Scheme (AVS) in response to the Royal Commission into Aboriginal Deaths in Custody recommendation, to support Aboriginal people who have been taken into police custody.

=== Tasmania ===
Statewide CLCs in Tasmania include:

- The Tenants' Union of Tasmania provides information, legal advice and representation to residential tenants in matters arising from their tenancy.
- The Women's Legal Service is a free community legal service based in Hobart but providing legal services for women throughout Tasmania.
- Refugee Legal Service Tasmania is a volunteer legal service dedicated to providing advice to refugees, asylum seekers and other humanitarian entrants who reside in Tasmania.
- Worker Assist Tasmania is a free service for injured workers in Tasmania. The service provides information, assistance and advice relating to Workers Compensation, Return to Work and Rehabilitation following a workplace injury and the Asbestos Related Diseases Compensation Fund.

There are also regional CLCs in Hobart, Launceston and North West Tasmania.

=== Victoria ===
In Victoria, the peak body is the Federation of Community Legal Centres. Statewide specialist CLCs include:

- Djirra – Aboriginal family violence
- Q+Law (state-wide LGBTIQA+ legal service)
- Seniors Rights Victoria
- The Tenants Union Victoria (TUV)
- Women's Legal Service Victoria
- Victorian Aboriginal Legal Service (VALS), which operates the Custody Notification Scheme
- Youthlaw

There are also a number of local centres including the Fitzroy Legal Service which was established on 18 December 1972, making it Australia's first non-Aboriginal community legal centre.

The Consumer Action Law Centre (CALC) is primarily a "campaign-focused consumer advocacy organisation", but also acts as a CLC by providing free legal advice and pursuing litigation on behalf of "vulnerable and disadvantaged consumers" across Victoria.

=== Western Australia ===
- The Community Legal Centres Association of WA is the peak organisation representing the 28 CLCs operating in Western Australia which provide free or low-cost legal help to the community.
- The Woman's Law Centre is based in Perth and provides legal advice on such areas as family law, sexual harassment and sexual assault and divorce applications.

== ATSILS ==
Aboriginal and Torres Strait Islander Legal Services (ATSILS) are independent, non-profit, non-government bodies that provide a range of culturally sensitive services to Indigenous Australians. Their main focus is criminal and family law, and eligibility is limited to those on low incomes. They also advocate for law and policy changes, such as those which have a bearing upon the high rate of Indigenous incarceration in Australian prisons. The Law Council of Australia is a strong ally.

The Aboriginal Legal Service (NSW/ACT), established in 1970, was the first dedicated Aboriginal legal service, and can be regarded as the first ATSILS. The Victorian Aboriginal Legal Service (established 1973) has been providing legal services under contract in Victoria since April 2005, and the Aboriginal Legal Service of Western Australia for WA. The system was expanded to Queensland that June, and to additional States and Territories thereafter.

NATSILS (National Aboriginal and Torres Strait Islander Legal Services) is the peak body, as of 2020 representing:

- Aboriginal and Torres Strait Islander Legal Service (Qld) (ATSILS (Qld);
- Aboriginal Legal Rights Movement (ALRM) in Adelaide;
- Aboriginal Legal Service (NSW/ACT);
- Tasmanian Aboriginal Community Legal Service (TACLS); from 1 July 2020 Tasmanian Aboriginal Legal Service (TALS); stakeholders were alarmed by the announcement of the new single national mechanism for funding all legal services, to take effect from July 2020. The Human Rights Law Centre, the Law Council and others called upon the government to retain ILAP.
- North Australian Aboriginal Justice Agency (NAAJA);
- Aboriginal Legal Service of Western Australia (ALSWA); and
- Victorian Aboriginal Legal Service (VALS).

ATSILS and other stakeholders were alarmed by the announcement of the new single national mechanism for funding all legal services, to take effect from July 2020. The Human Rights Law Centre, the Law Council and others called upon the government to retain ILAP.

=== NATSILS ===
NATSILS, established in 2007, has close links with the Coalition of Peaks, the SNAICC – National Voice for Our Children (formerly Secretariat of National Aboriginal and Islander Child Care), National Family Violence Prevention Legal Services, Australian Council of Social Services (ACOSS), and the Law Council of Australia.

As of February 2024 the chair is Karly Warner, CEO of the Aboriginal Legal Service (NSW/ACT), and deputy chair is Nerita Waight, CEO of VALS.

== FVPLS ==
Australia has about 30 Indigenous Family Violence Prevention Legal Services (FVPLS). The National Family Violence Prevention and Legal Services Forum (National FVPLS Forum), established in May 2012, as of September 2020 represents thirteen Family Violence Prevention Legal Service (FVPLS) member organisations.

== Legal Aid Commissions ==
Legal Aid Commissions (LACs) are state and territory independent statutory bodies which provide a range of services, including information, legal advice and representation in courts and tribunals. Information and services including telephone advice are often free of charge, but there is a means test for eligibility for legal representation. They often assist those who need help with serious criminal law matters, or child protection and family matters involving a child's welfare.

Australia has eight Legal Aid Commissions:

- Legal Aid ACT
- Legal Services Commission of South Australia
- Tasmania Legal Aid
- Legal Aid New South Wales
- Legal Aid Queensland
- Legal Aid Western Australia
- Northern Territory Legal Aid Commission
- Victoria Legal Aid

Legal Aid ACT was established in 1977. It provides legal information and advice to ACT residents on such issues as criminal law, family law, and some civil law matters.

== See also ==
- Law centre, the UK equivalent
- Legal aid
