= Victoria Legal Aid =

Australian organisation that provides information, legal advice, and education

Agency overview
- Formed: December 1995
- Preceding agency: Legal Aid Commission of Victoria
- Jurisdiction: Government of Victoria
- Agency executive: Toby Hemming, Chief Executive Officer
- Website: www.legalaid.vic.gov.au

Victoria Legal Aid (VLA), formerly the Legal Aid Commission of Victoria, is an Australian organisation that provides information, legal advice and education. As a statutory authority, VLA operates under the Legal Aid Act 1978 and is funded by the Australian Government for matters that fall under Commonwealth law, and the Victorian state government. The majority of Commonwealth law matters fall within the family law jurisdiction. Another source of funding is from the public purpose fund, made up of interest paid on money that is collected by the Legal Services Board from solicitors' trust accounts.

As of 2025, Toby Hemming is CEO.

== History ==
The idea of legal aid is more than 100 years old in Victoria.

Before 1928 only prisoners or very poor people could apply to the Supreme Court for legal aid. By 1969, new legislation made the Legal Aid Committee responsible for civil and minor criminal cases, resulting in the Australian Legal Aid Office. The Legal Aid Commission of Victoria (LACV) was set up in 1978.with an 11-member board. Victoria Legal Aid replaced the LACV in December 1995.

== Structure ==
VLA has a board of directors, a chief executive officer, three large in-house legal practice directorates, an in-house advocacy team, and legal and corporate support functions.

The Board is responsible for ensuring Victoria Legal Aid meets its statutory objectives and carries out its functions and duties in accordance with the Legal Aid Act 1978. It has a Chairperson and six directors nominated by the Victorian Attorney-General and appointed by the Governor-in-Council. At least one member must have experience in financial management; at least one must have experience in public management; at least one must have experience with criminal proceedings (either as a legal practitioner or a judicial officer) and at least one must have experience in other areas of legal practice engaged in by Victoria Legal Aid or its officers. When the position of Managing Director at VLA was changed to Chief Executive Officer in November 2018, there was a vacancy on the Board. This position has since been filled by Andrew Saunders. The Chief Executive Officer cannot be appointed to the Board.

== Current programs and objectives ==
• Civil Justice Program • Criminal Law Program • Family, Youth and Children's Law Program

=== VLA Chambers ===
Victoria Legal Aid maintains an in-house advocacy practice to ensure it has thorough and practical knowledge of the needs and challenges of jurisdictions in which legal aid services are provided. The primary function of Victoria Legal Aid Chambers (Chambers) is to provide high quality advocacy for legally aided clients in civil, criminal and family, youth and children’s law matters and to conduct strategic litigation to remedy a legal problem or change a policy or process to benefit an individual client and the broader community.

== See also ==
- Consumer Action Law Centre, funded in part by Victoria Legal Aid
- Legal aid in Australia
- The Legal Aid Society
