= Redfern Legal Centre =

Community legal centre in New South Wales, Australia

- Redfern Town Hall, where the Redfern Legal Centre is located.
- Headquarters: Redfern, Sydney, New South Wales
- Key people: Camilla Paldolfini – CEO

Redfern Legal Centre (RLC) is an independent, non-profit community legal centre established in 1977 and located in the Sydney inner-city of Redfern, New South Wales. It is part of a network of four inner-Sydney region community legal centres, including the Inner City, Kingsford, and Marrickville Legal Centres. Redfern Legal Centre is a member of Community Legal Centres NSW, the state peak representative body for community legal centres in NSW and also Community Legal Centres Australia, the national peak representative body for community legal centres across Australia.

Redfern Legal Centre should not be confused with the Aboriginal Legal Service, also located in Redfern, which was the first free legal service in Australia and founded in 1970.

The RLC is dedicated to promoting social justice and human rights and provides free legal advice, referral, and casework to disadvantaged people and groups who live with its catchment area, which extends to the Botany, Leichhardt, and City of Sydney municipal areas. Many of those seeking assistance are ineligible for legal aid but still cannot afford private legal services. A high proportion of the centre's clients are from Aboriginal and Torres Strait Islander and other culturally and linguistically diverse communities. The RLC is dedicated to community legal education and advocates for the reform of inequalities in laws, the legal system, administrative practices and society as a whole.

== Areas of advice ==
The RLC is a general community legal centre providing free legal advice to the community in a number of key areas. The centre has been involved in key cases and areas of law reform with an increased focus on police accountability. In 2020, RLC launched an investigation into a potential class action suit against the NSW police for their unlawful use of strip searches. They have also referred a case involving a NSW police officer allegedly assaulting an indigenous teenager to the independent police watchdog. The centre also provides specific legal advice in the following areas.

- Child Protection
- Consumer
- Credit & Debt
- Crime (minor)
- Discrimination and Human Rights
- Domestic Violence
- Employment
- Family Law
- Fines
- Immigration Law
- Police Complaints
- Property Damage
- Tenancy
- International students service

== Staff and Board ==
RLC has over 20 staff members split between this general legal team, Inner Sydney Tenancy Advice & Advocacy Service and administration and management. The current Chief Executive Officer is Camilla Paldolfini. Jacqui Swinburne acts as the Chief Operations Officer along with Alexis Goodstone as Principal Solicitor forming the senior management of the organisation. The centre is supported by the board, with Kerry O’Brien acting as chair of the board and Tamara Sims as secretary.

== Volunteers and pro-bono ==
The RLC relies heavily on volunteer labour and pro-bono assistance from legal professionals to service a heavy caseload. Daytime volunteers tend to be law students or members of the community. Night-time volunteers are solicitors and legal assistants who attend appointments and give legal advice. RLC estimates it attracts approximately 30,000 volunteer hours per year or the equivalent of $900,000 worth of services to the community each year.

== Awards ==
RLC received the 2007 Human Rights Law Award from the Australian Human Rights and Equal Opportunity Commission. In particular the award recognised the establishment of the Women’s Domestic Violence Court Assistance Scheme (WDVCAS) which aims to provide women seeking restraining orders as a result of domestic violence with legal advice as well as any other support required (including housing, income support and counselling).
