= Maguire v Sydney Organising Committee for the Olympic Games (2000) =

Decision by the Australian Human Rights and Equal Opportunity Commission

Maguire v SOCOG 2000 was a legal case in Australia about making a website accessible to a visually impaired person.

== Complaint ==
On 7 June 1999, Maguire made a complaint to the human rights and equal opportunity commission (HREOC), alleging that the Sydney Organising Committee for the Olympic Games (SOCOG) had discriminated against him as a person disabled, in contravention of the Disability Discrimination Act 1992 in three aspects: the failure to provide braille copies of the information required to order Olympic Games tickets; the failure to provide braille copies of the Olympic Games souvenir programme; and the failure to provide a website which was accessible to Maguire. After the completion of the ticket book case (Maguire v SOCOG 1999 ) on 30 September 1999, conciliation on the remaining matters was attempted but by 29 November 1999, the talks failed.

== Maguire v SOCOG 2000 (HREOC) ==
Maguire v Sydney Organising Committee for the Olympic Games (Human Rights and Equal Opportunity Commission), No. H 99/115, 11 August 2000 (hearing), 24 August 2000 (decision). The commissioner, on 25 February 2000, notified the two parties about resuming the inquiry on 27 March 2000. On that day 27 March, SOCOG in a direction conference agreed to provide the Souvenir programme to Maguire in braille.

=== Seeking information ===
From 27 March 2000 to 4 August 2000, several direction conferences and letters from Maguire's solicitor to SOCOG solicitor asking SOCOG to provide information in order for Mr Worthington and Ms Treviranus who were experts in computers and adaptive technology to complete their assessment did not result in the experts receiving the complete amount of information. In providing Mr Worthington and Ms Treviranus with incomplete information, SOCOG maintained that the HTML source code was commercially sensitive to SOCOG and its contractor IBM. The complete information that was sought was "a sample page in electronic format from the proposed Results Table on the SOCOG website relating to the Olympic Games and the Paralympic website" (the latter request was abandoned upon advice by SOCOG that it was not involved in the organisation of the Paralympic Games); the current content plan for the Olympic website; the number of templates to be used; the details of the tools used to generate the pages of the Olympic website; and detailed calculations of certain "ball park" figures."

=== Jurisdiction ===
At the 3 July hearing, SOCOG presented the amended legislation effective from 13 April 2000 that transferred complaint hearing powers from HREOC to the Federal Court. The commissioner felt that the amendment did not apply because of 31 August 1999 directions. SOCOG sought Federal Court review of the commissioner's ruling, but on 3 August 2000, the Federal court dismissed the case.

=== Number of complaints ===
A witness statement submitted on 1 May 2000 confirmed that Maguire accessed SOCOG's website on 17 April 2000 and found some changes to the website but some other areas remained inaccessible. The witness statement asked for "That SOCOG include ALT text on all images and image map links on the website; That SOCOG ensure access from the Schedule page to the Index of Sports; and That SOCOG ensure access to the Results Tables on the web site during the Olympic Games." . SOCOG used this statement to argue that the April 2000 complaint was different from the June 1999 complaint. The commissioner maintained that SOCOG's website was inaccessible and did not meet the W3C guidelines on accessibility. It was noted that SOCOG on 27 July 2000 provided Maguire information of URL addresses of each of the 37 individual sports to access the index of sports from the schedule. Even though the original complaint was general which was then particularised for the three areas, the commissioner felt the April 2000 and the June 1999 complaints were the same.

=== Service ===
SOCOG argued that the promotional material of the website was not included by the DDA 1992 definition of "service". The commissioner declared that the provision of information was included by the Section 4 definition of "service" which made Section 24 valid.

=== Treated less favourably ===
SOCOG submitted that there was not any direct discrimination as Maguire in using the website was not treated less favourably than a sighted person. The incompletion of adding ALT texts and an imperfect mode access that should not be attempted by a sighted person were reasons that caused the commissioner to find that SOCOG in providing services in a manner accessible to sighted persons but inaccessible or partially accessible to a blind person violated section 5 and 24 of DDA 1992 Additionally, the commissioner found that SOCOG violated Section 6 by imposing a requirement that Maguire should be able to read print, with which a substantially greater proportion of persons without Maguire's disability was able to comply.

=== Unjustifiable hardship ===
SOCOG said that it did not discriminate unlawfully against Maguire but if it did, that the cost and effort in retraining staff and redrawing entire development methods was an unjustifiable hardship in providing an accessible website. SOCOG argued that the Table of Results is composed of data sourced from a number of different databases of results for each of 37 sporting disciplines; the site consists currently of 6,000 pages and approximately 55,000 pages will be generated during the course of the Games; there are 37 sports webpage templates each with approximately 35 result templates – in total 1,295 templates for results alone; the tables of results will contain "wrapped text within cells"; there will be approximately six billion "hits" on the site and the site needs to be fast and very responsive; to reformat the site and its contents in a way which will make the website accessible to the complainant will in effect require the development of a new or separate website; extensive changes to infrastructure are required; there is a requirement for specialised skills which are limited and expensive; there will be possible adverse effects upon the support and maintenance systems; one person working 8-hour business days would require 368 days to complete the task properly; $2.2 million of additional infrastructure would be required to separately host the additional designs necessary to an accessible Table of Results.

However, Maguire with expert witnesses argued that the number of templates is significantly less than 1,295 and the reformatting of the templates will require considerably less than the two hours for each alleged by SOCOG; a more realistic estimate for the minor changes required is ten minutes each; nor is there the need for unique manually generated formats; no new infrastructure will be required because it is allegedly extant; a team of one experienced developer with a group of 5-10 assistants could provide an accessible site to Level A compliance in four weeks; wrapping in each cell can be met by using a simple device namely the inclusion of an invisible end of cell character which would indicate to a blind person the end of the text in each cell; the cost of making the site accessible is a modest amount; the number of templates has been estimated at 357 for 28 sports. Additional templates would be required for 37. Because of the failure of respondent to supply the information requested by letter on 31 March 2000 the number of templates has been estimated.

The expert witnesses of Maguire who provided months of advice convinced the commissioner more than the expert witnesses of SOCOG who provided days of advice just before the August hearing. Despite conflicting arguments stated above, the Commissioner found that SOCOG who had unlawfully discriminated in violation of the DDA, delayed the final determination of that complaint of the commissioner and took advantage of matters consequential upon that delay in order to support its alleged inability to cure its problem.

=== Final decision ===
The Commissioner found that SOCOG had engaged in unlawful discrimination against Maguire in violation of Section 24 of the DDA 1992. SOCOG was ordered to render its website accessible including ALT text on all images and image map links on its website; providing access to the Index of Sports from the Schedule page; and providing access to the Results Tables to be used on the website during the Sydney Olympic Games by 15 September 2000. Failure on SOCOG's part to comply with that order would give Maguire the option to press for compensation.

== Bruce Lindsay Maguire v. Sydney Organising Committee for the Olympic Games 2000 HREOC ==
Bruce Lindsay Maguire v. Sydney Organising Committee for the Olympic Games (Respondent) (HREOC) H 99/115, date of hearing: 6 November 2000, date of ex tempore decision: 6 November 2000, date of written decision: 18 November 2000.

The Commissioner found that SOCOG only partially complied and as a result, by section 103(1)(b)(iv) of the DDA, the commissioner awarded Maguire $20,000.

== Case significance ==
Australian governments have decided to adopt the W3C Guidelines, with the Commonwealth Government requiring all agency websites to pass accessibility tests by 1 December 2000.

It is questionable what tests are to be complied with, and what degree of compliance would be required. Since this case there been greater scrutiny of the accessibility of subsequent Olympic Games websites. Peter Coroneos from the Internet Industry Association warned businesses that the SOCOG decision confirmed that the DDA applied to online services and that Australian websites targeting overseas customers may be liable under equivalent legislation.

== See also ==
- Maguire v Sydney Organising Committee for the Olympic Games (1999)

== Bibliography ==
- Bruce Lindsay Maguire v. Sydney Organising Committee for the Olympic Games (Respondent) H 99/115 (2000), 17 December 2007, Human Rights and Equal Opportunity Commission, last visited on Saturday 30 August 2008, 10:43pm, http://www.humanrights.gov.au/disability_rights/decisions/comdec/2000/DD000200.htm
- DISABILITY DISCRIMINATION ACT 1992 - SECT 12 Application of Act, 25 August 2008, Australasian Legal Information Institute, last visited on Friday 29 August 2008, 6:37pm, http://www.austlii.edu.au/au/legis/cth/consol_act/dda1992264/s12.html
- DISABILITY DISCRIMINATION ACT 1992 - SECT 5 Disability discrimination, 25 August 2008, Australasian Legal Information Institute, last visited on Saturday 30 August 2008, 9:30pm, http://www.austlii.edu.au/au/legis/cth/consol_act/dda1992264/s5.html
- DISABILITY DISCRIMINATION ACT 1992 - SECT 24 Goods, services and facilities, 25 August 2008, Australasian Legal Information Institute, last visited on Friday 29 August 2008, 6:43pm, http://www.austlii.edu.au/au/legis/cth/consol_act/dda1992264/s24.html
- DISABILITY DISCRIMINATION ACT 1992 - SECT 6 Indirect disability discrimination, 25 August 2008, Australasian Legal Information Institute, last visited on Friday 29 August 2008, 8:35pm, http://www.austlii.edu.au/au/legis/cth/consol_act/dda1992264/s6.html
- DISABILITY DISCRIMINATION ACT 1992 - SECT 4 Interpretation, 25 August 2008, Australasian Legal Information Institute, last visited on Friday 29 August 2008, 6:48pm, http://www.austlii.edu.au/au/legis/cth/consol_act/dda1992264/s4.html
- DISABILITY DISCRIMINATION ACT 1992 - SECT 11 Unjustifiable hardship, 25 August 2008, Australasian Legal Information Institute, last visited on Friday 29 August 2008, 6:43pm, http://www.austlii.edu.au/au/legis/cth/consol_act/dda1992264/s11.html
- GamesBids.com - Athens 2004 Web Site Not Disabled Friendly?, Thursday, 22 April 2004, GamesBids.com, last visited on Sunday 14 September 2008, http://www.gamesbids.com/eng/index.php?news=1082654074
- Human Rights and Equal Opportunity Commission Website, 17 December 2007, Human Rights and Equal Opportunity Commission, last visited on Friday 29 August 2008, 4pm EST, http://www.humanrights.gov.au/disability_rights/decisions/comdec/1999/DD000150.htm
- Human Rights and Equal Opportunity Commission Website, 17 December 2007, Human Rights and Equal Opportunity Commission, last visited on Saturday 30 August 2008, 1:43pm, "http://www.humanrights.gov.au/disability_rights/decisions/comdec/2000/DD000120.htm"
- Maguire v Sydney Organising Committee for the Olympic Games [2000] FCA 1112 (3 August 2000), 11 August 2000, Federal Court of Australia, last visited on Friday 29 August 2008, 9:57pm, "http://www.austlii.edu.au/au/cases/cth/federal_ct/2000/1112.html"
- Office of Legislative Drafting and Publishing, Attorney General's Department, Canberra, 27 March 2006, Disability Discrimination Act 1992, Australasian Legal Information Institute, last visited on Friday 29 August 2008, 4:51pm EST
- Olympic Failure: A Case for Making the Web Accessible, 2000, Tom Worthington, last visited on Sunday 14 September 2008, 11:06am, http://www.tomw.net.au/2000/bat.html
- The Law Report: 5 October 1999 - SOCOG and HREOC; Jaidyn Leske-Justice Denied?, 5 October 1999, ABC, last visited on Friday 29 August 2008, 9:14pm, http://www.abc.net.au/rn/talks/8.30/lawrpt/stories/s57027.htm
- Web Site for the 2008 Beijing Olympics: Integrating Sport, Money, Phones and Politics, 1 July 2007, Tom Worthington, last visited on Sunday 14 September 2008, 11:42am, "http://www.tomw.net.au/2003/beijing_olympics.shtml
