= Redfern Post Office =

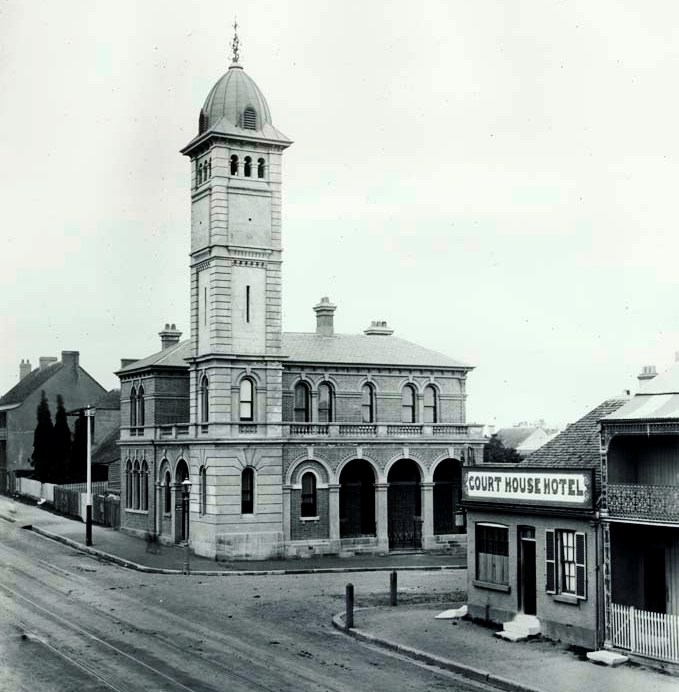
- Redfern Post Office, c. 1890

- Location within Sydney Location within Australia
- 33°53′34″S 151°12′09″E
- Location: 113 Redfern Street, Redfern, City of Sydney, New South Wales, Australia

History
- Built: 1881–1883

Site notes
- Architect: Designed by the Colonial Architect’s Office under James Barnet
- Architectural style: Victorian Italianate
- Owner: Australia Post

New South Wales Heritage Register
- Official name: Redfern Post Office
- Type: State heritage (built)
- Designated: 22 December 2000
- Reference no.: 1439
- Type: Post Office
- Category: Postal and Telecommunications
- Builders: Goddard and Pittman

Redfern Post Office is a heritage-listed former residence and now post office located at 113 Redfern Street in the inner western Sydney suburb of Redfern in the City of Sydney local government area of New South Wales, Australia. It was designed by the Colonial Architect’s Office under James Barnet and built by Goddard and Pittman. The property is owned by Australia Post, an agency of the Australian Government. It was added to the New South Wales State Heritage Register on 22 December 2000.

== History ==
Redfern's natural landscape was defined by sand hills and swamps. The Carrahdigang, more widely known as the Cadigal people, valued the area for its abundant supply of food. The name Redfern originates from an early land grant to William Redfern in 1817. It was previously known as Roberts Farm and Boxley's Swamp.

The majority of houses in Redfern in the 1850s were of timber. From the 1850s market gardeners congregated in Alexandria south of McEvoy Street, around Shea's Creek and Bourke Road. In 1885 the Sands Sydney Directory listed 54 market gardens. While many were worked by European-Australians, by the 1870s Chinese market gardeners had acquired leases in the district and a decade later were dominating the trade.

The passing of the Sydney Slaughterhouses Act in 1849 brought other businesses to the district. This act banned abattoirs and noxious trades from the city. Tanners, wool scourers and wool-washers, fellmongers, boiling down works and abattoirs had 10 years to move their businesses outside city boundaries. Many of the trades moved to Redfern and Waterloo – attracted by the water. The sand hills still existed but by the late 1850s Redfern was a flourishing suburb housing 6,500 people.

The Municipalities Act of 1858 gave districts the option of municipal incorporation. Public meetings were held and after a flurry of petitions Redfern Municipality was proclaimed on 11 August 1859, the fourth in Sydney to be formed under the Act. Redfern Town Hall opened in 1870 and the Albert Cricket Ground in 1864. Redfern Post Office came in 1882. The Eveleigh Railway complex in 1886 became one of the largest employers in the state. Redfern was an industrial working class suburb by the end of the 19th century. Reschs brewery and other factories attracted migrants. The Syrian/Lebanese community began settling around Redfern and Surry Hills by the 1880s.

In the 1940s 73 per cent of all industrial activity in Sydney was concentrated within a radius of 6 kilometres (3.5 mi) from Redfern railway station. Many of its services have disappeared or been substantially downgraded over the last couple of decades, even though Redfern is still a densely populated inner city suburb.

=== Postal services ===
The first official postal service in Australia was established in April 1809, when the Sydney merchant Isaac Nichols was appointed as the first Postmaster in the colony of NSW. Prior to this, mail had been distributed directly by the captain of the ship on which the mail arrived, however this system was neither reliable nor secure. In 1825 the colonial administration was empowered to establish a Postmaster General's Department, which had previously been administered from Britain.

In 1828 the first post offices outside of Sydney were established, with offices in Bathurst, Campbelltown, Parramatta, Liverpool, Newcastle, Penrith and Windsor. By 1839 there were forty post offices in the colony, with more opened as settlement spread. During the 1860s, the advance of postal services was further increased as the railway network began to be established throughout NSW. In 1863, the Postmaster General W. H. Christie noted that accommodation facilities for Postmasters in some post offices was quite limited, and stated that it was a matter of importance that "post masters should reside and sleep under the same roof as the office".

The first telegraph line was opened in Victoria in March 1854 and in NSW in 1858. The NSW colonial government constructed two lines from the GPO, one to the South Head Signal Station, the other to Liverpool. Development was slow in NSW compared to the other states, with the Government concentrating on the development of country offices before suburban ones. As the line spread, however, telegraph offices were built to accommodate the operators. Unlike the Post Office, the telegraph office needed specialised equipment and could not be easily accommodated in a local store or private residence. Post and telegraph offices operated separately until 1870 when the departments were amalgamated, after which time new offices were built to include both postal and telegraph services. In 1881 the first telephone exchange was opened in Sydney, three years after the first tests in Adelaide. As with the telegraph, the telephone system soon began to extend into country areas, with telephone exchanges appearing in country NSW from the late 1880s onwards. Again the Post Office was responsible for the public telephone exchange, further emphasising its place in the community as a provider of communications services.

The appointment of James Barnet as Acting Colonial Architect in 1862 coincided with a considerable increase in funding to the public works program. Between 1865 and 1890 the Colonial Architects Office was responsible for the building and maintenance of 169 Post Offices and telegraph offices in NSW. The post offices constructed during this period featured in a variety of architectural styles, as Barnet argued that the local parliamentary representatives always preferred "different patterns".

The construction of new post offices continued throughout the Depression years under the leadership of Walter Liberty Vernon, who held office from 1890 to 1911. While twenty-seven post offices were built between 1892 and 1895, funding to the Government Architect's Office was cut from 1893 to 1895, causing Vernon to postpone a number of projects.

Following Federation in 1901, the Commonwealth Government took over responsibility for post, telegraph and telephone offices, with the Department of Home Affairs Works Division being made responsible for post office construction. In 1916 construction was transferred to the Department of Works and Railways, with the Department of the Interior responsible during World War II.

On 22 December 1975, the Postmaster General's Department was abolished and replaced by the Post and Telecommunications Department. This was the creation of Telecom and Australia Post. In 1989, the Australian Postal Corporation Act established Australia Post as a self-funding entity, heralding a new direction in property management, including a move away from the larger more traditional buildings towards smaller shop front style post offices.

For much of its history, the post office has been responsible for a wide variety of community services including mail distribution, an agency for the Commonwealth Savings Bank, electoral enrolments, and the provision of telegraph and telephone services. The town post office has served as a focal point for the community, most often built in a prominent position in the centre of town close to other public buildings, creating a nucleus of civic buildings and community pride.

=== Redfern Post Office ===
Although the first land grants in Redfern were made in 1817 to Dr William Redfern by Governor Macquarie, it was not until the 1840s and 1850s that a suburb began to develop. The construction of the first railway in Sydney, with its terminus at Redfern encouraged the growth of the suburb, with Redfern being proclaimed a municipality on 11 August 1859. Between 1851 and 1891, the population of the suburb nearly doubled every decade, with the suburb having the second highest density of population per acre in Sydney, exceeded only by the adjacent suburb of Darlington.

The first post office in Redfern was opened in Pitt Street, Redfern on 1 July 1856, following the closure of the Chippendale office. During this period, as with most other branches of post offices, the office was run from a rented premise. On 1 October 1871 a branch of the Government Saving Bank opened at Redfern Post Office, followed in c. 1875 by the introduction of the money order system. The allowance to issue money orders saw Redfern announced as an official Post Office in 1875. The status of official post office then gave impetus to calls for a government-owned post office to be erected in the suburb.

The Municipal Council made the first representations to the government for the erection of an office post office building in August 1878. Following the Council's petition, a block of land was secured in Redfern Street for the construction of a post office. The lot had a 15-metre (50 ft) frontage to Redfern Street and 30-metre (100 ft) to George Street, Redfern. The land was purchased at A£15 per 0 metres (1 ft).

In November 1878, Postal Inspector Moyse visited Redfern to inspect the proposed construction site. Moyse suggested a second site in Botany Road for the Post Office, while the GPO Secretary suggested that the search for the site be put to tender. Tenders were called, during which the Council again offered the Redfern Street site which was accepted by the Postmaster General on 9 January 1879. Following the Postmaster General's decision, the Colonial Architect's Office was authorised to proceed with the drawing of plans for the new office at an estimated cost of A£3,000. The new post office included a telegraph office, parlour, drawing room, three bedrooms, kitchen, servant's room, bathroom, scullery, washhouse, fuel shed and two stall stables. In 1880, A£3,000 was placed on the Parliamentary Estimates for the erection of the Redfern office.

The plans for the new building were submitted to Public Works prior to the commencement of any work on the site. The Public Works added a clock tower for an estimated extra A£700. The Postmaster General put the new design out to tender with Messrs Goddard and Pittman's tender for A£3,692 being accepted on 6 October 1881. Redfern Post Office was completed by 29 January 1883 and occupied on 31 January. On 16 April 1904 a new telephone exchange room was added at a total cost of A£203. A separate Telephone Exchange building was constructed next door to the Post Office on Redfern Street in c. 1915, which echoes the architectural style of the Post Office.

In c. 1938 the conversion of the residence's dining room and kitchen into a ground floor mail room was undertaken, involving the removal of some of the original fixtures, including fireplaces and the centre wall. A porch at the eastern end of the northern facade was also created at this time. Other work on the office included the removal of the single-storey southern section, some time after 1938, and the replacement of the original slate roof with red tiles as well as the removal of the chimneys and the closure of the fireplaces in the c. 1950s.

== Description ==
Redfern Post Office is a landmark feature of the Redfern area, located on a prominent corner looking towards the city. Built in 1882, Redfern Post Office is a two-storey Victorian Italianate building with a dominant four and half-storey corner clock tower and is constructed in flush rendered brickwork with cut-render quoining. The building has a later red-tiled hipped roof with bracketed eaves, corrugated-iron and rolled-zinc skillion, and flat roof sections set behind balustraded parapets. There are no chimneys retained on the building.

The tower has four clock faces located on each face of the fourth storey, below a squat belvedere capped by a domed copper roof and above single lancet windows in each face of the third floor. Each clock face has black writing on a white background. As the tower was inaccessible at the time of inspection, it is not known whether the original clock mechanism is still intact. Access to the tower appears to be via a series of timber ladders from the window off the first-floor roof.

Attached to the rear of the building are three, later, single-storey additions. The rendered and painted brick section (as shown in Image 7) contains the male bathroom and there is an external storage shed attached to it on the southern side. The third, single-storey face brick addition is between and abuts the multi-storey Telstra building and the Post Office.

There are three porches on the ground floor of Redfern Post Office, forming public entries beneath the corner tower and at the eastern corner, with a disused entry to the former post boxes porch on the western facade. The floors to all three porches have modern red tiles, concrete steps, and terrazzo doorway thresholds, with some new aluminium handrails attached to the corner entry.

The building has a rendered finish, painted in a tan and maroon colour scheme and the window frames have been painted dark green. The ground floor is dominated by moulded arched detailing with prominent keystones and pilasters, and ashlar cut render to the base of the tower and the eastern end of the northern facade. There is a continuous moulded string course cutting across the arched windows of the first floor, with another at the level of the main roof eaves on the corner tower. Metal grilles are located within the eastern end opening of the northern facade and the southern openings of the western facade, and there is a new wrought-steel gate at the laneway. The southern balustrade section of the western facade appears to be original. Windows to the street facades of the building comprise tall, arched timber sash windows, both paired and single, spaced evenly around the building.

The interior of the ground floor of Redfern Post Office comprises four main areas. These include the carpeted retail and office areas, and the sheet-vinyl-floored mail rooms and staff facilities. There is modern tiling in the male bathroom. The ceilings of the ground floor are a combination of set plaster in the stairwell, plasterboard with a coved cornice in the lunchroom and plaster with a moulded cornice in the mail rooms, hall entry and retail area. Most of the painted ceilings have severe peeling. There are large pendant lights in the retail and office areas, with a ceiling fan and exposed air conditioning ducting. The remainder of this level has suspended and attached fluorescent lighting and air conditioning ducting. The retail area ceiling has been painted pink, and the remainder painted green. Architraves appear to be original to original openings, with modern trim to later openings. Large sections of original or early skirting have been retained, with some cut render skirting to the western wall of the retail area. Windows on the ground floor are tall timber sash windows with arched top sashes. Some four panel original or early doors have been retained to this level, however the majority of internal doors are modern flush and half-glazed doors. Walls are rendered and painted masonry, with timber veneer partitions in the retail area and asbestos cement sheet infill walls within the stair hall. The ground-floor colour scheme incorporates tan coloured walls with white trim and two chimney breasts have been retained, though bricked in. The central stair comprises original turned timber posts and balusters painted white, with a shaped rail, carved and painted end brackets and sheet vinyl treads. There is a modern tubular steel rail attached to the wall and original or early timber panelling encloses the storeroom below the stair.

The original first-floor residence of Redfern Post Office is currently vacant and has sheet-vinyl-flooring, excepting the tiled female bathroom and locker room in the southeastern corner, which are still utilised. The western storeroom currently has a mail chute installed in the floor which accesses the ground floor. The first-floor ceilings comprise a variety of types and all have been painted green. These include board and batten ceilings with a flat strip cornice to the locker room and ladies bathroom; plasterboard with a coved cornice in the southeastern corner section of hall; and pressed metal with a moulded cornice in the hall, northeastern, northwestern and southwestern rooms. There is square set plaster in the western storeroom and plaster with a moulded cornice in the western end of the stair landing. The first floor has attached fluorescent lighting and ceiling fans, with suspended fluorescent lighting in the northeastern room, and there is a single air conditioning unit in the northeastern room on the ceiling. This level retains predominantly original skirting, with later wide skirting to partition walls, all trims being painted white. Architraves appear to be original or early to original openings.

Windows on the street facades of the first floor are tall, double hung sash windows with arched top sashes, as found on the ground floor. There are squared sash windows in the stair hall and the southern wall of the northeastern room. The internal doors are four panelled, some with modifications, and there are loading doors adjacent to the hoist in the eastern wall of the northeastern room. The walls are rendered and painted masonry, painted tan with white trim and there are partition walls dividing the northeastern and northwestern rooms. The modern hoist in the northeastern room is still operable, and is attached diagonally to the walls. There is a curved section of rendered wall in the stair hall that follows through to the ground floor. Three chimney breasts retained on the first-floor level have been bricked in.

Signage to Redfern Post Office is limited to standard Australia Post signs attached over the north facade eastern side entry and at the southern end of the western facade, with street signs attached to the base of the tower at first-floor level. The lettering "Redfern Post Office 1882" is centred over the inset arched windows of the northern facade.

The surrounding streetscape comprises predominantly two to multi-storey retail, commercial and residential mixed use buildings, primarily twentieth-century, but with some late nineteenth-century buildings. The Post Office abuts the intrusive, multi-storey Telstra building to the south and the former telephone exchange to the east, which matches the style of the Post Office. Both of these buildings fully enclose the concreted rear yard of the Post Office. There are some street trees in the area, however none in close proximity to the Post Office, which is surrounded by concrete footpaths.

The only outbuilding associated with the Post Office is the small attached brick shed at the southeastern corner of the building.

=== Condition ===
As at 4 August 2000, the building is generally in very good condition. Archaeological potential of the site is considered fair.

The exterior form of Redfern Post Office is largely intact, with some modifications to the rear over time, and the addition of painted render. The interior has undergone extensive change, which has been concentrated largely on the ground floor with the introduction of larger public areas and mail room facilities. The first floor has also undergone some changes, but a greater extent of original fabric and layout remain. Redfern Post Office retains the features which make it culturally significant, which includes the prominent corner clock tower and the overall style, form and scale of the building.

=== Modifications and dates ===
The original Post Office building comprised two storeys, with a residence on the upper floor and in the rear of the building, and a corner clocktower. It is possible that the original building had open colonnade sections to each facade that have since been infilled.

Conversion of the residence's dining room and kitchen into the rear ground-floor mailroom occurred c. 1938 and involved the removal of the original fireplaces and centre wall. At this time, the porch at the eastern end of the northern facade was also created.

The date of the removal of the single-storey southern section of the building is unknown, although it was some time after 1938.

Removal of the original slate roof and replacement with red tiles, probably occurred at the same time as the removal of the chimneys and bricking in of the fireplaces, possibly c. 1950s-60s. This is also possibly when the removal of dormers in the copper clocktower roof occurred.

The date of the removal of the post boxes from the western facade porch is unknown, although it appears to have occurred quite recently. The neighbouring multi-storey Telstra building on George Street is also a recent construction.

=== Further information ===
The building is generally in very good condition, with the exception of the severe peeling paint in the interior of both floors.

Archaeological potential of the site is considered fair, as there has been considerable work carried out on and around the site since first construction. Evidence of early structures or land use however, could be retained within the currently concreted yard and laneway.

== Heritage listing ==
As at 4 August 2000, Redfern Post Office is significant at a State level for its historical associations, aesthetic qualities and social meaning.

Redfern Post Office is associated with the early development of Redfern Municipality, as it is linked with the original postal services established in the area in 1856. Redfern Post Office reflects the rapid population growth of the area during the latter part of the nineteenth century, which resulted in the need for an improved level of services to the local residents. It has been the centre of communications for the local community for over a century.

Paired with the adjacent former Telephone Exchange building, Redfern Post Office provides an insight into the development of communications services in NSW.

Redfern Post Office is aesthetically significant because it is a substantial example of the Victorian Italianate style, and makes an important aesthetic contribution to central Redfern as a dominant nineteenth century public building. Redfern Post Office is also associated with the Colonial Architect's Office under James Barnet, a key practitioner of the Victorian Italianate style of architecture.

Redfern Post Office is also considered to be significant to the community of Redfern's sense of place.

Redfern Post Office was listed on the New South Wales State Heritage Register on 22 December 2000 having satisfied the following criteria.

The place is important in demonstrating the course, or pattern, of cultural or natural history in New South Wales.

Redfern Post Office is associated with the early development of Redfern Municipality as it is linked with the original postal services established in the area in 1856.

Redfern Post Office reflects the rapid population growth of the area during the latter part of the nineteenth century, which resulted in the need for an improved level of services to the local residents. It has been the centre of communications for the local community for over a century.

Paired with the former Telephone Exchange building, Redfern Post Office provides an insight into the development of communications services in NSW. Redfern Post Office was designed by Colonial Architect James Barnet, a key practitioner of the Victorian Italianate style of architecture. The Colonial Architect's Office under Barnet designed and maintained a large number of post offices across NSW between 1865 and 1890. Redfern Post Office was designed by Colonial Architect James Barnet, a key practitioner of the Victorian Italianate style of architecture. The Colonial Architect's Office under Barnet designed and maintained a large number of post offices across NSW between 1865 and 1890.

The place is important in demonstrating aesthetic characteristics and/or a high degree of creative or technical achievement in New South Wales.

Redfern Post Office is aesthetically significant because it is a substantial example of the Victorian Italianate style, and makes an important aesthetic contribution to central Redfern as a dominant nineteenth century public building.

It compares in style and form with Kempsey (1886), Hay (1882) and Forbes (1881) Post Offices, although Redfern is larger in scale.

The scale, architectural style and location of the building, along with the prominent corner clock tower, also make it a focal point defining the centre of Redfern, endowing it with landmark qualities. The adjacent Telephone Exchange is architecturally sympathetic to the Post Office, and together add to the character of the corner of Redfern and George Street.

The place has a strong or special association with a particular community or cultural group in New South Wales for social, cultural or spiritual reasons.

Redfern Post Office is a prominent civic building and a local landmark, and has been the centre of communications for the area for over a century. As such, it is considered to be important to the Redfern community's sense of place.

The place has potential to yield information that will contribute to an understanding of the cultural or natural history of New South Wales.

The site has some potential to contain archaeological information relating to the previous use of the site and the evolution of the building and outbuildings associated with the use by the Post Office.

The place possesses uncommon, rare or endangered aspects of the cultural or natural history of New South Wales.

Redfern Post Office is a particularly strong example of the Victorian Italianate style of architecture. The large massing of Redfern Post Office gives an unusual prominence to the tall corner clock tower.

The adjacent Telephone Exchange appears to be largely intact, and is considered to be rare surviving example of early twentieth century exchange buildings.

The place is important in demonstrating the principal characteristics of a class of cultural or natural places/environments in New South Wales.

Redfern Post Office is part of the group of nineteenth-century Victorian Italianate post offices in NSW designed by the Colonial Architect's Office under James Barnet.

== See also ==
- Australian non-residential architectural styles
