= Redfern, New South Wales =

Inner suburb of Sydney, Australia

Redfern
- Suburb
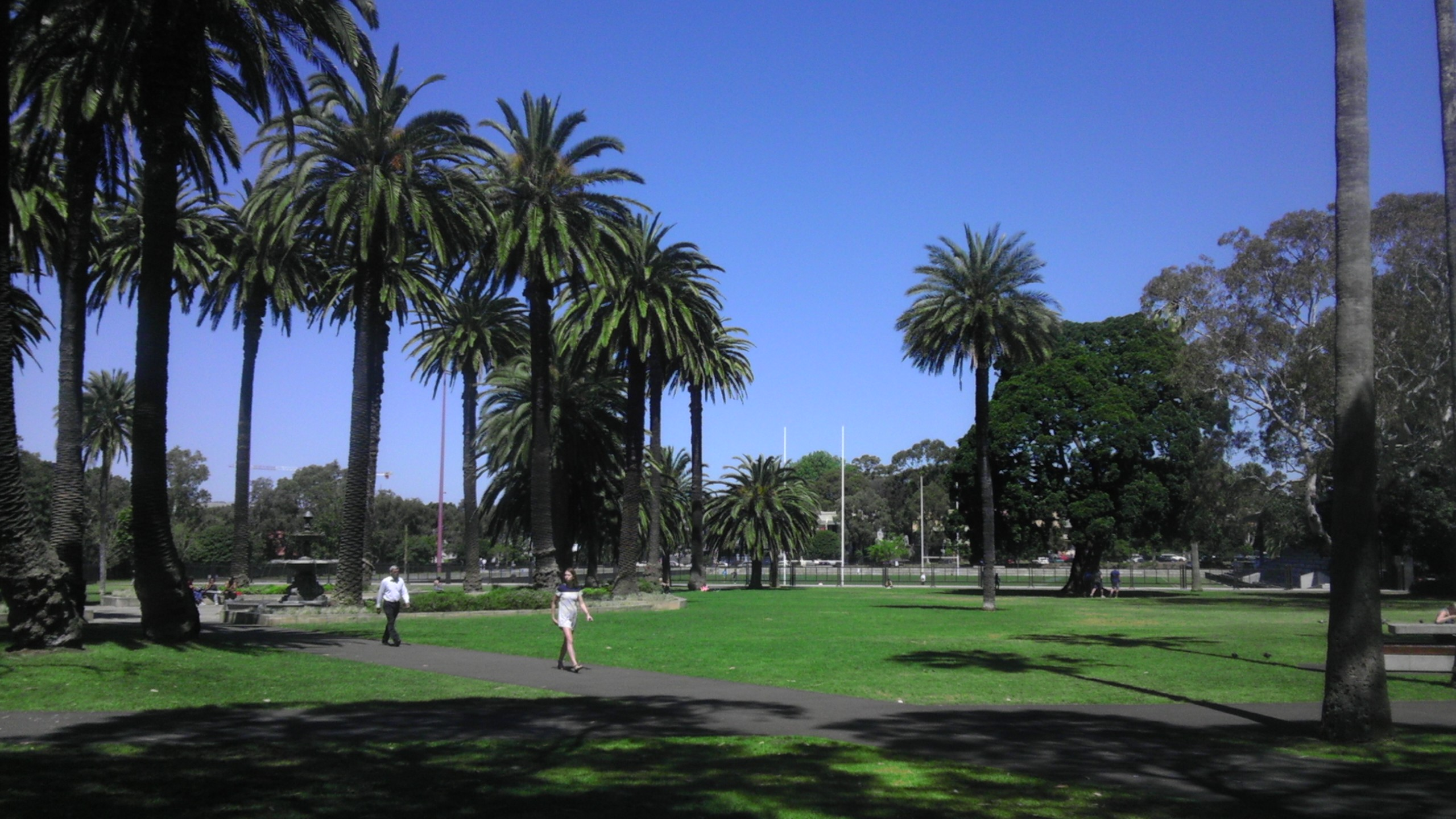
- Redfern Park, the location of Prime Minister Paul Keating's eponymous 1992 address

- Interactive map of Redfern
- Coordinates: 33°53′36″S 151°12′17″E
- Country: Australia
- State: New South Wales
- City: Sydney
- LGA: City of Sydney
- Location: 3 km (1.9 mi) S of Sydney CBD

Government
  - State electorate: Newtown
  - Federal division: Sydney

Area
  - Total: 1.17 km^{2} (0.45 sq mi)
- Elevation: 37 m (121 ft)

Population
  - Total: 13,072 (SAL 2021)
  - Density: 11,173/km^{2} (28,940/sq mi)
- Postcode: 2016
Suburbs around Redfern
Chippendale	Central	Surry Hills
Darlington	Redfern	Moore Park
Eveleigh	Alexandria	Waterloo

Redfern is an inner southern suburb of Sydney located 3 kilometres (1.9 mi) south of the Sydney central business district and is part of the local government area of the City of Sydney. Strawberry Hills is a locality on the border with Surry Hills. The area experienced the process of gentrification and is subject to extensive redevelopment plans by the state government, to increase the population and reduce the concentration of poverty in the suburb and neighbouring Waterloo (see Redfern-Waterloo Authority).

== History ==
The suburb is named after surgeon William Redfern, who was granted 100 acres (0.40 km^{2}) of land in this area in 1817 by Lachlan Macquarie. He built a country house on his property surrounded by flower and kitchen gardens. His neighbours were Captain Cleveland, an officer of the 73rd regiment, who built Cleveland House and John Baptist, who ran a nursery and seed business. Sydney's original railway terminus was built in Cleveland Paddocks and extended from Cleveland Street to Devonshire Street and west to Chippendale. The station's name was chosen to honour William Redfern. At that time, the present Redfern station was known as Eveleigh. When Central station was built further north on the site of the Devonshire Street cemetery, Eveleigh station became Redfern and Eveleigh was retained for the name of the Eveleigh Railway Workshops, south of the station. The remains of Cleveland Paddocks became Prince Alfred Park.

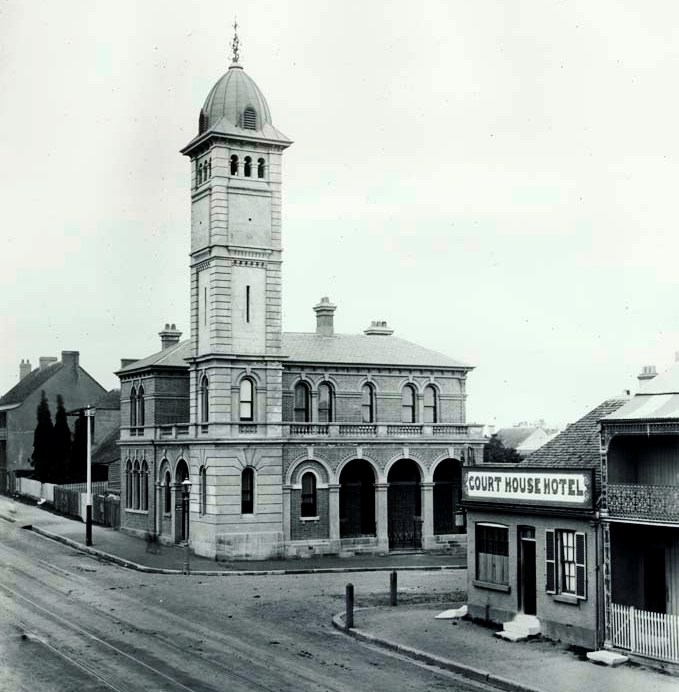
Redfern Post Office, early 1890s

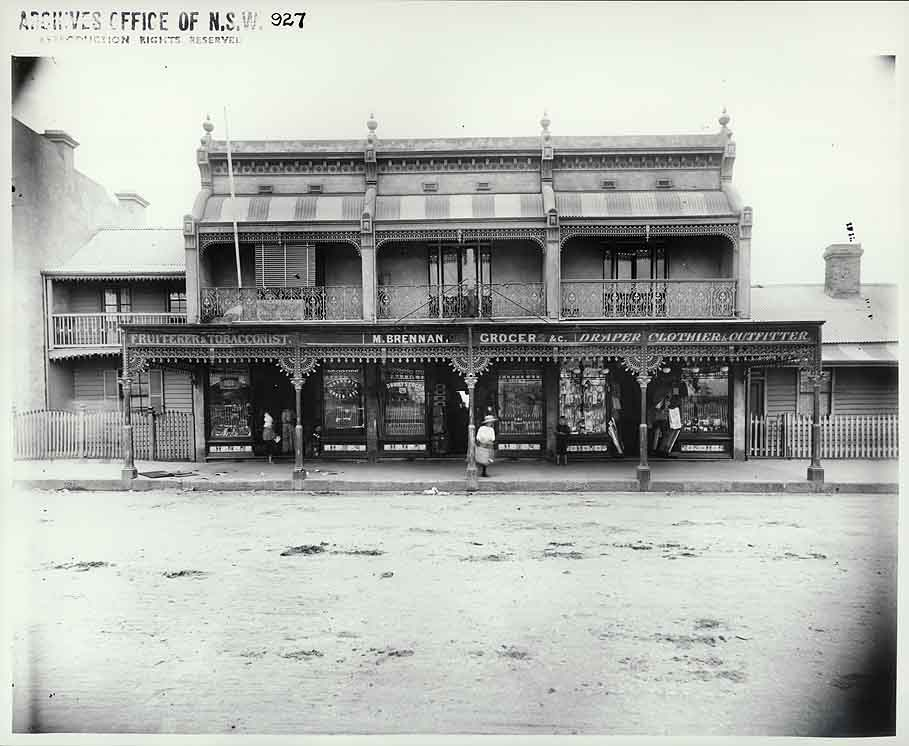
Elizabeth Street in 1890

In August 1859, Redfern was incorporated as a borough. The Municipality of Redfern merged with the City of Sydney from 1 January 1949. The first recorded and codified game of Australian rules football in NSW was played in Redfern on the Albert Ground, Redfern between the Rugby Union Club, Waratah, and the Carlton Football Club from Melbourne.

On 17 January 1908, the South Sydney Rabbitohs rugby football club was formed at Redfern Town Hall to compete in the first season of the New South Wales Rugby Football League premiership.

In July 1947, the Redfern Council commissioned the firm Smith and Styles for large-scale proposals for Urban renewal in Redfern, to conform to the Cumberland County Council masterplan zoning. The proposal included "clearance" of wide swathes of buildings across the suburb, a national theatre and opera house. This planning scheme was required by the Local Government (Town and Country Planning) Act 1945. From 1949 Redfern was absorbed by the City of Sydney council.

In the 1960s and 70s, Liquidambar styraciflua trees were planted in Baptist Street in attempts to green and improve the physical environment. The notorious Redfern Mail Exchange was built in 1965, after 300 people were evicted from their homes on the 2.15-hectare (5.3-acre) site. It became the scene of many industrial disputes when the automatic mail-sorting machinery, which was supposed to sort mail more efficiently, destroyed many letters and became known as the Redfern Mangler.

In the late 1960s and 1970s, a black power movement, centred around Aboriginal Australian migrants to the city, formed and resulted in the creation of health clinics, food drives, housing co-operatives and a legal aid centre. A green ban helped save the Redfern Aboriginal Centre in the 1970s and activists from Redfern created the Aboriginal Tent Embassy in Canberra.

A 1981 transport report described Redfern as "Basically split" into three communities: East Redfern, Central Redfern, and West Redfern; the last "generally being considered with the Chippendale area". Contracting shopping opportunities was considered a problem on Regent Street/Botany Road, particular the Western side, due to the heavy traffic of this major road.

In 1997, the Aboriginal Housing Company, led by Mick Mundine, proposed commercial redevelopment and began demolishing around 70 derelict terrace houses on Eveleigh Street in Redfern. The evictions and demolitions sparked significant community pushback and marked the beginning of a decades-long struggle to rebuild the area, later known as the Pemulwuy Project.

The 2004 Redfern riots began on 14 February 2004, at the end of Eveleigh Street outside Redfern station, sparked by the death of Thomas 'TJ' Hickey. The teenager, riding on his bicycle, was allegedly being chased by a police vehicle, which led to his impalement on a fence. Members of his family were then reported to have started grieving for TJ around Eveleigh Street with a crowd gathering commiserating with the family. Fliers were distributed blaming police for TJ's death. The police closed the Eveleigh Street entrance to the railway station, but youths in the crowd became violent, throwing bricks and bottles; this escalated into a riot. A subsequent inquest found that although the police were following Hickey, they had not caused the accident, a verdict that caused controversy in Redfern's Indigenous community. The riots sparked fresh debate into the welfare of Indigenous Australians and the response of the police to those living in the Redfern area.

== Buildings ==
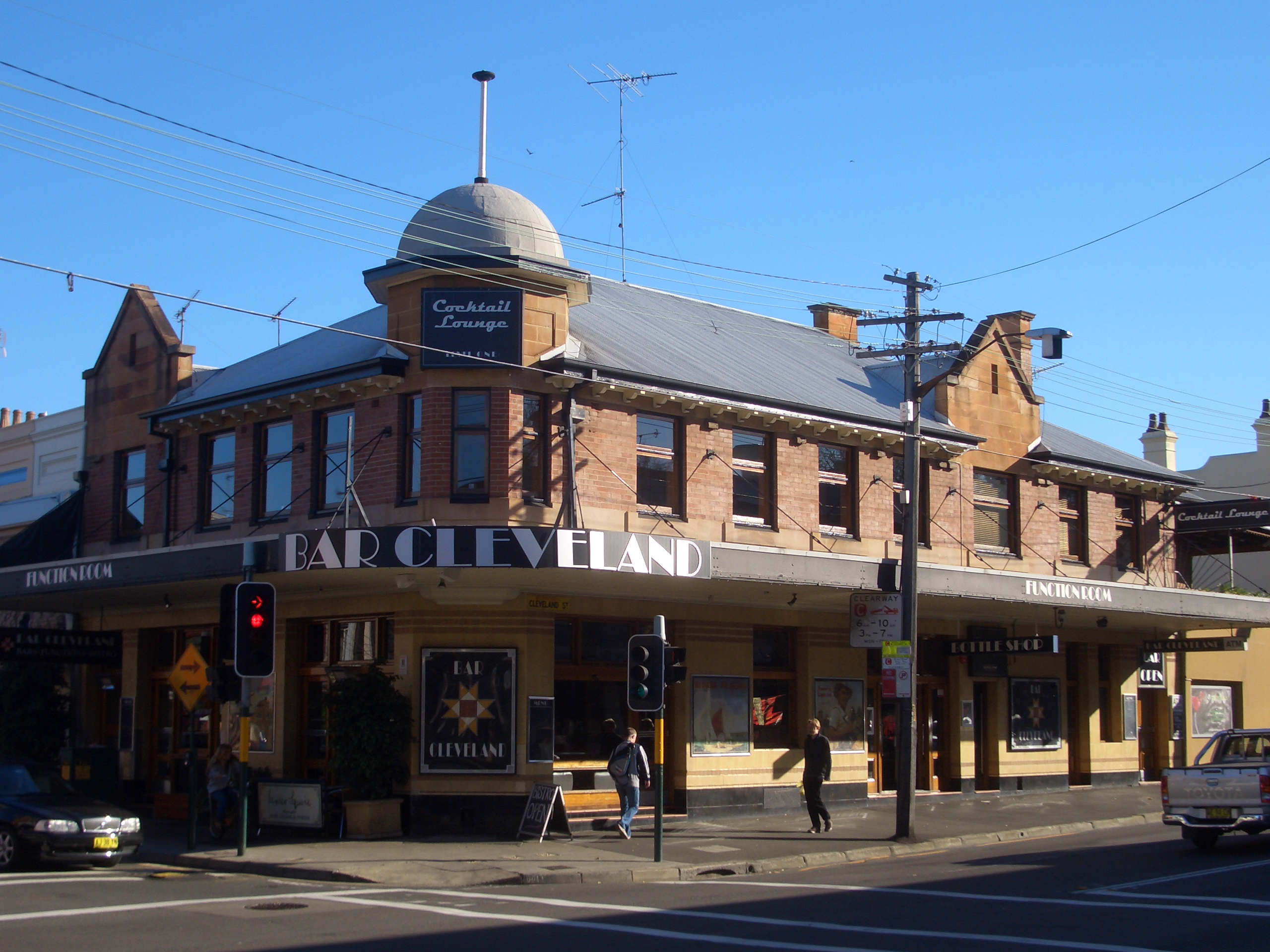
The Cleveland Inn on Cleveland Street

=== Commercial area ===
The main shopping strip is located on Redfern Street, east of Redfern railway station. There are also commercial developments nearby, along Regent Street and surrounding streets. The Redfern skyline is dominated by the TNT Towers and two residential blocks located between Regent Street and Gibbons Street, beside Redfern railway station.

=== Transport ===
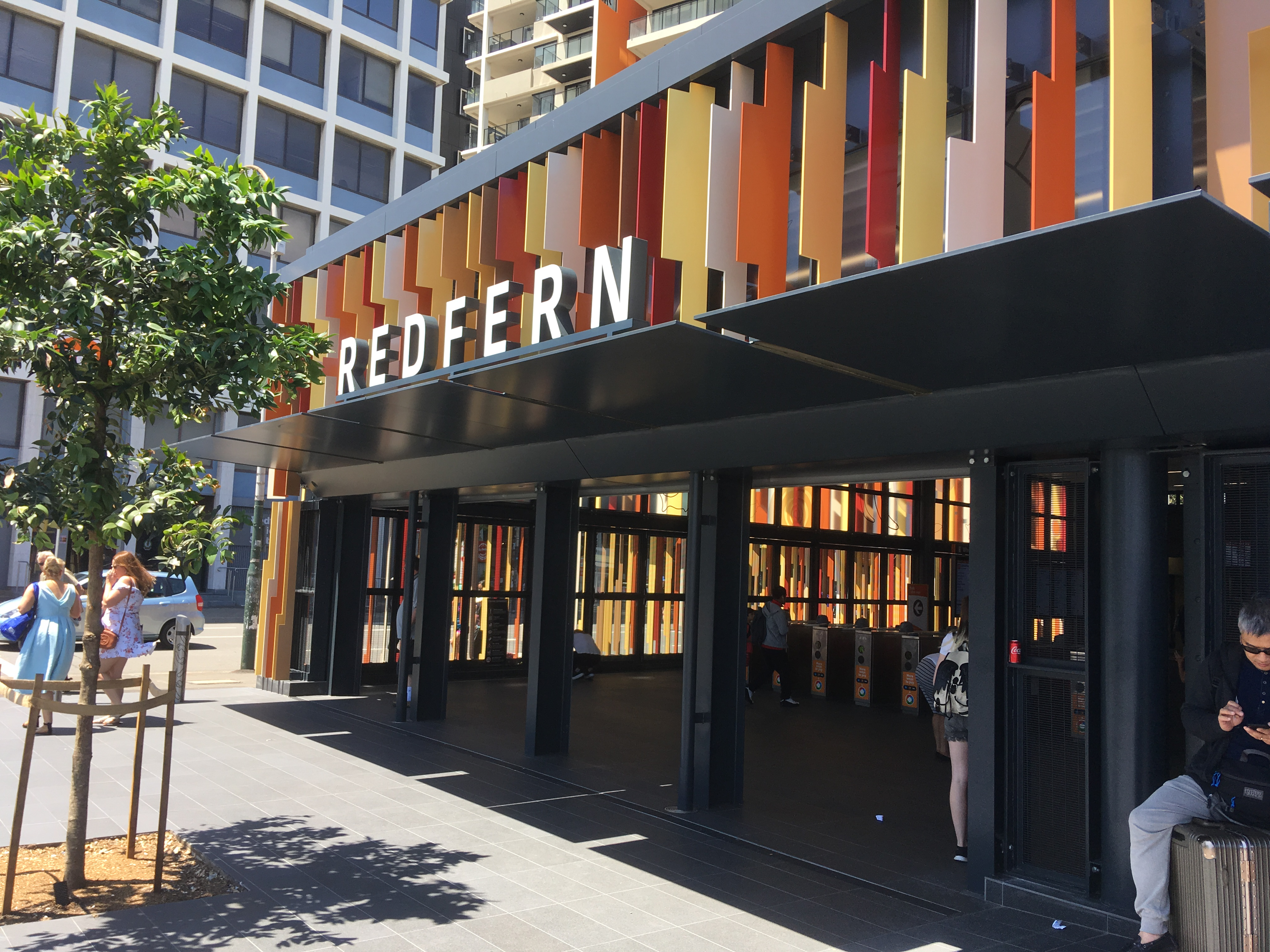
Redfern railway station

Redfern railway station, located on the western edge of the suburb is a major station on the Sydney Trains network. Redfern is the first station south from Central Sydney terminus on the edge of the city. Redfern station is the closest station to the main campus of the University of Sydney at Camperdown and Darlington. A near-constant stream of commuters flows from the station along the south side of Lawson Street towards the university in the morning, and back towards the station in a largely hourly rhythm in the afternoon.

Redfern is bisected by the Southern Arterial Route, a major one-way paired arterial road corridor.

=== Housing ===
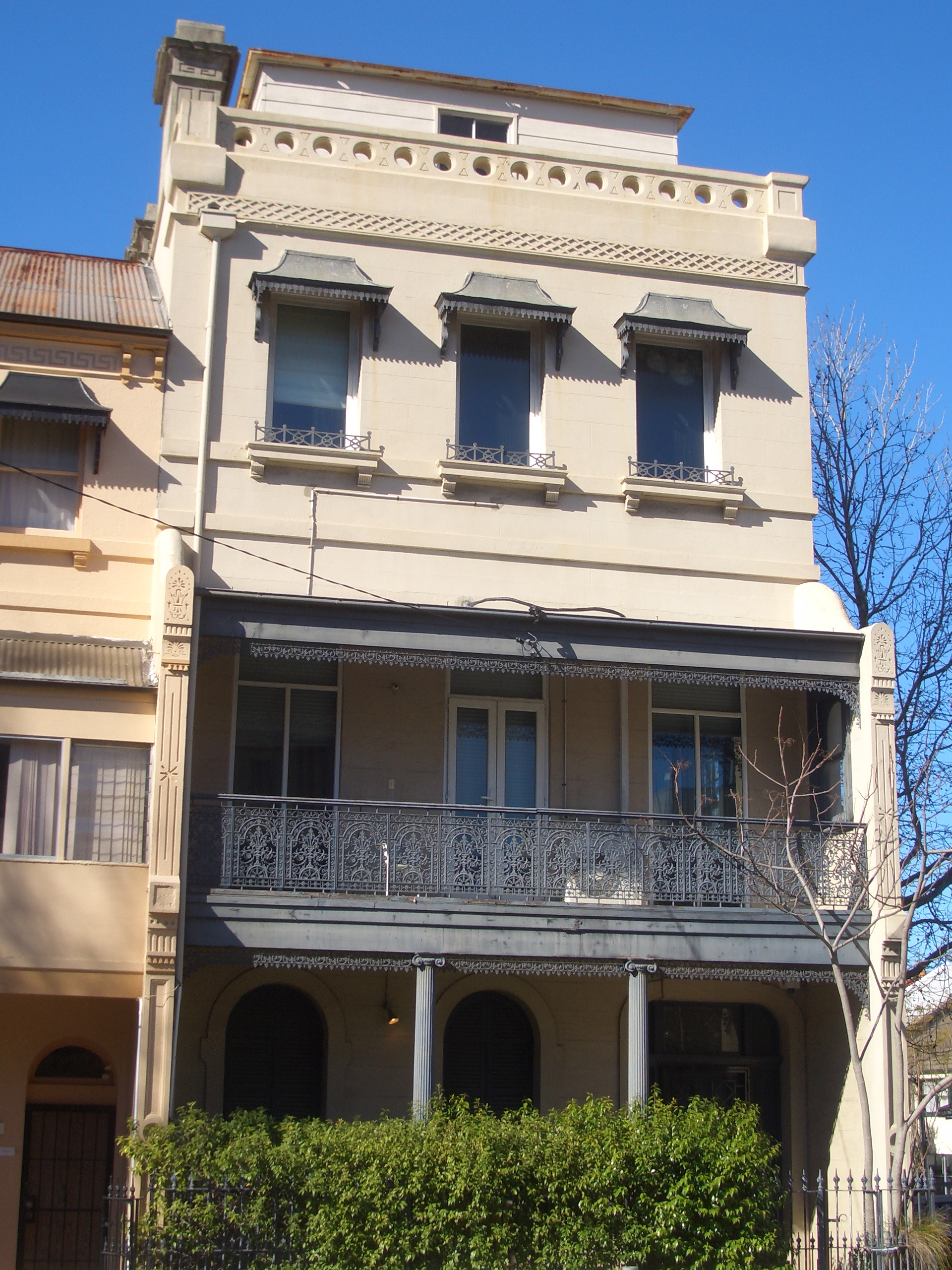
Terraces on Pitt Street

Redfern is an inner-Sydney suburb and has many examples of modern architecture. A Heritage Conservation Area covers much of Redfern, which includes numerous examples of pattern book Victorian terraces, similar to other inner suburbs such as Surry Hills and Paddington.

Redfern has a wide diversity of housing, including significant public housing (shared with Waterloo), consisting of flats, terrace houses and high rise apartment blocks.

One locality of public housing is named Poet's Corner.

=== Churches and schools ===
St Vincent de Paul Catholic Church is on Redfern Street. St Saviour's Anglican Church (which is also known as one1seven church) is on Young Street. St George Antioch Orthodox Church is on the corner of Walker Street and Cooper Street built by the historic Lebanese community in the area. The Greek Orthodox Church in Cleveland Street is called the Cathedral of the Annunciation of Our Lady, formerly St Paul's Church of England built in 1848 and designed by Edmund Blacket. The St Andrew's Greek Orthodox Theological College sits beside it. Hillsong Church's city campus is at 188 Young Street. There is also another cathedral, the St Maroun's Cathedral for the Lebanese community.

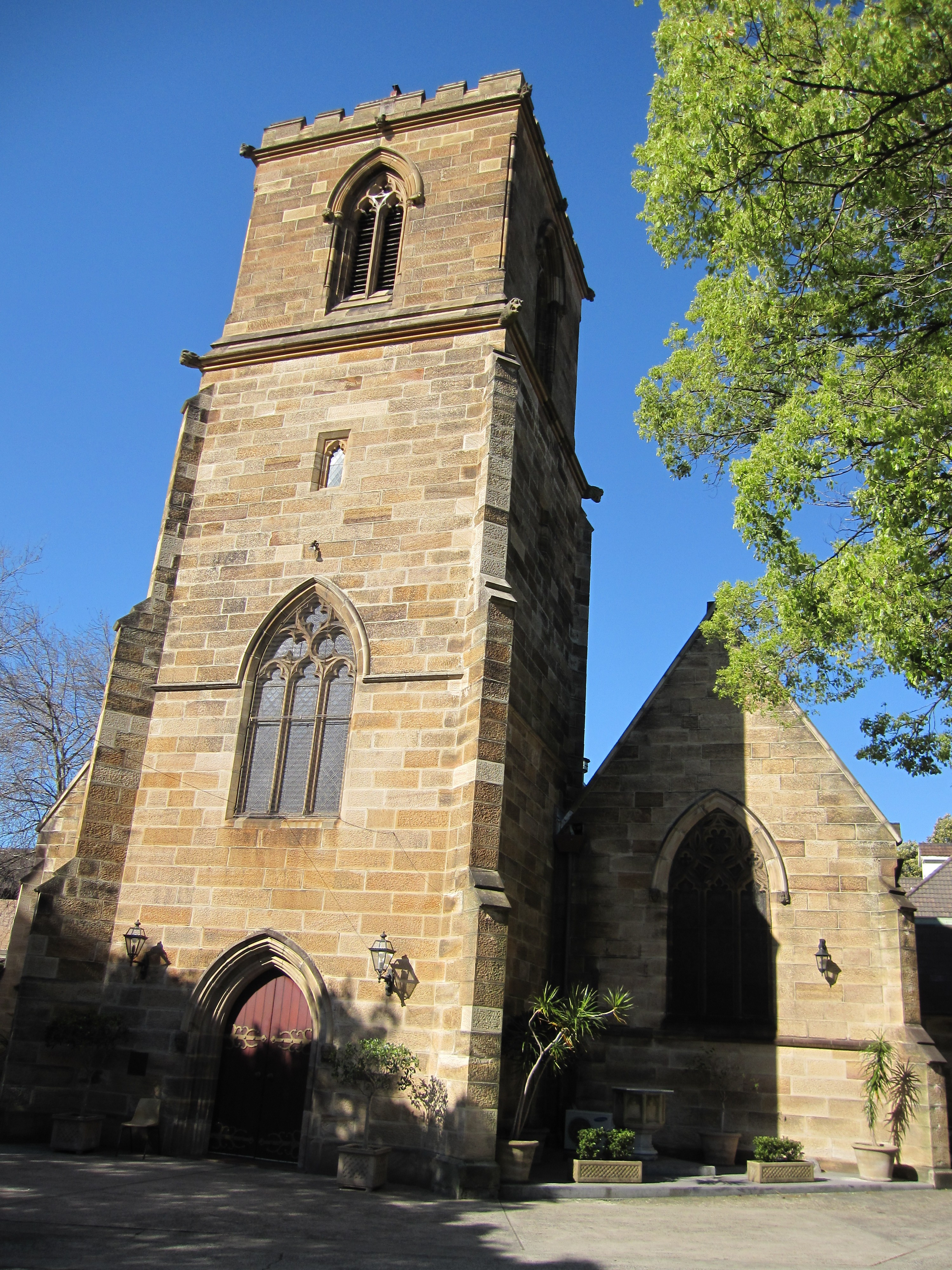
Cathedral of the Annunciation of Our Lady

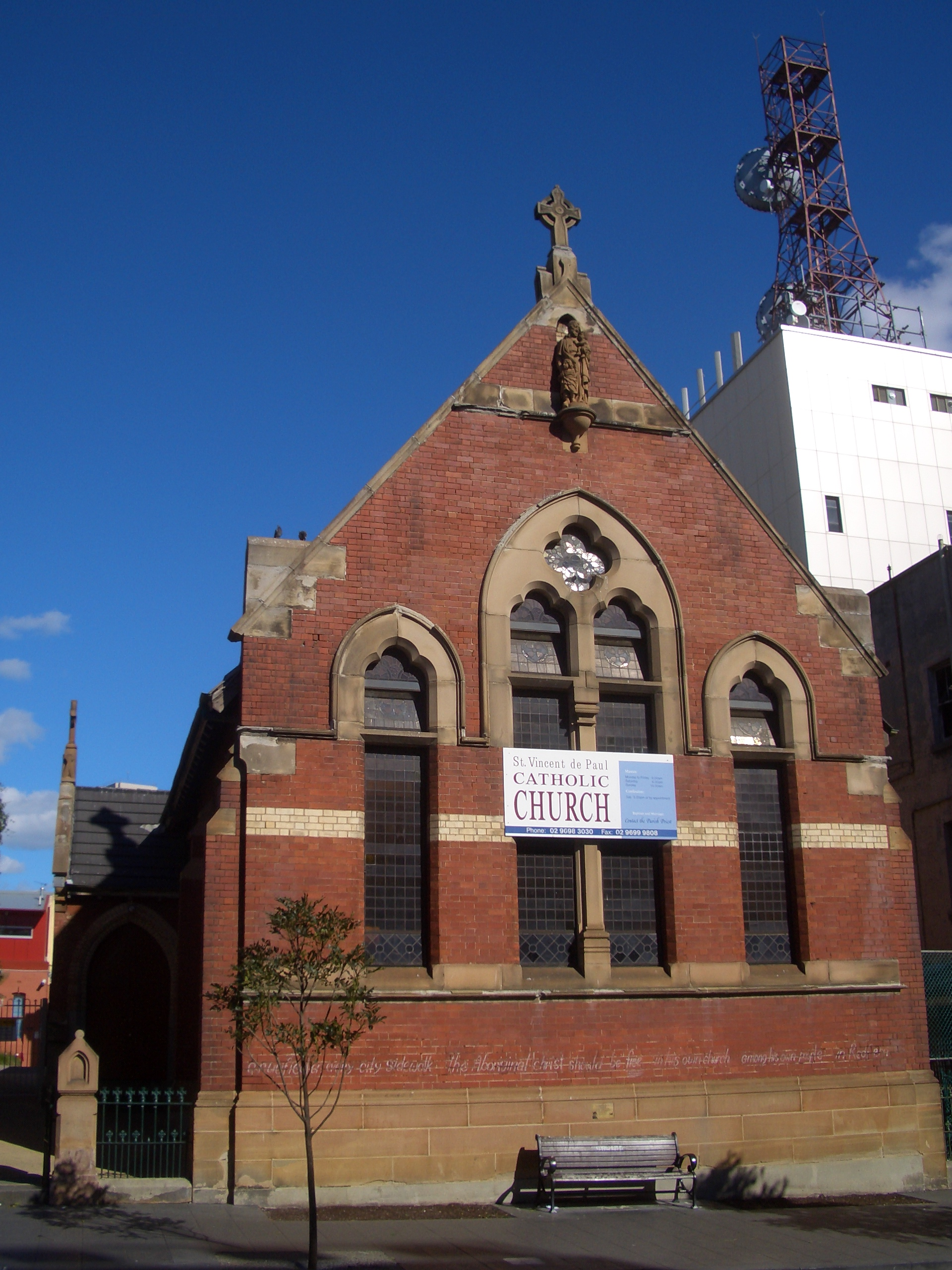
St Vincent de Paul Catholic Church

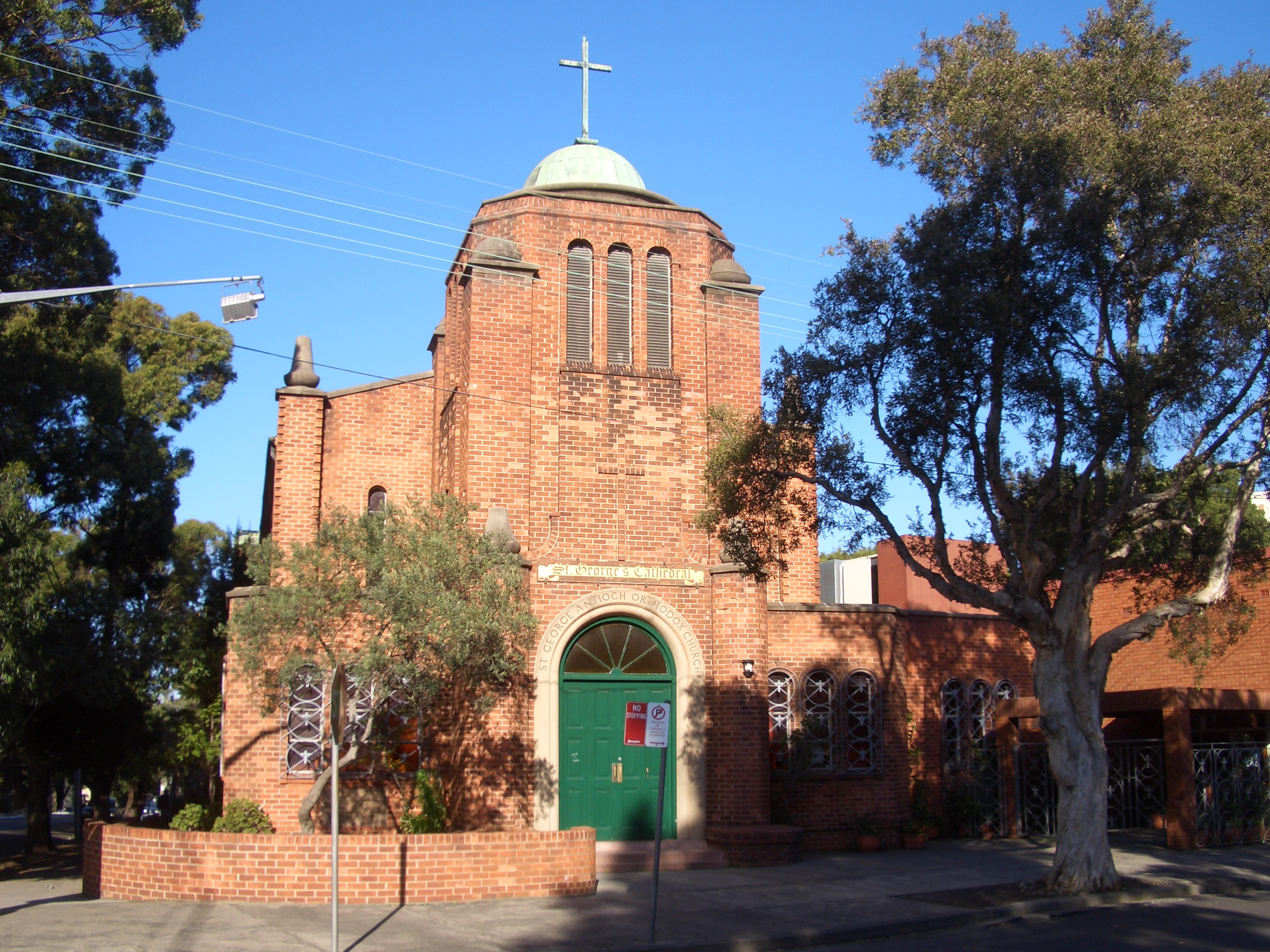
St George Antiochian Orthodox Cathedral

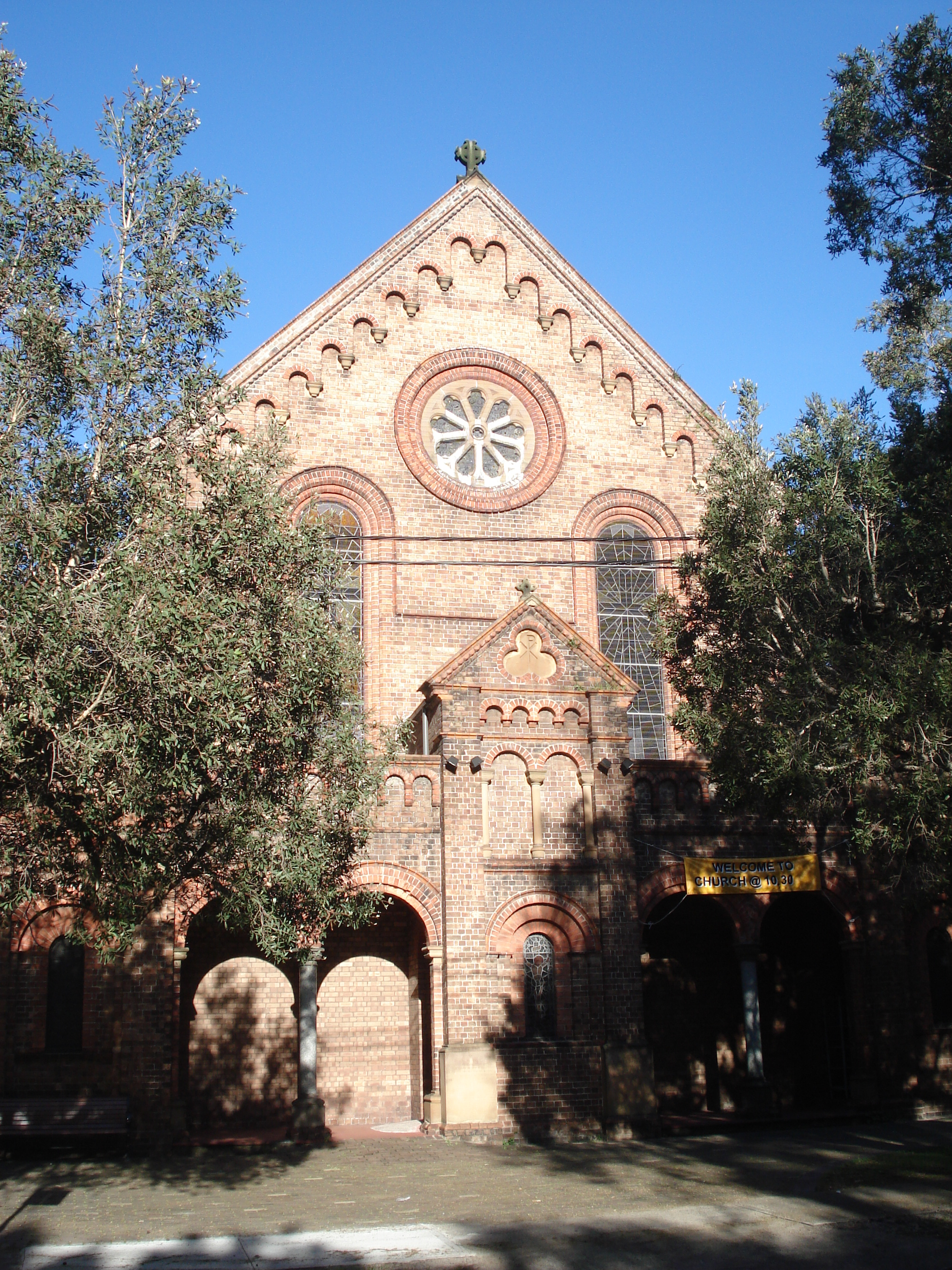
one seven church (St Saviour's Anglican Church)

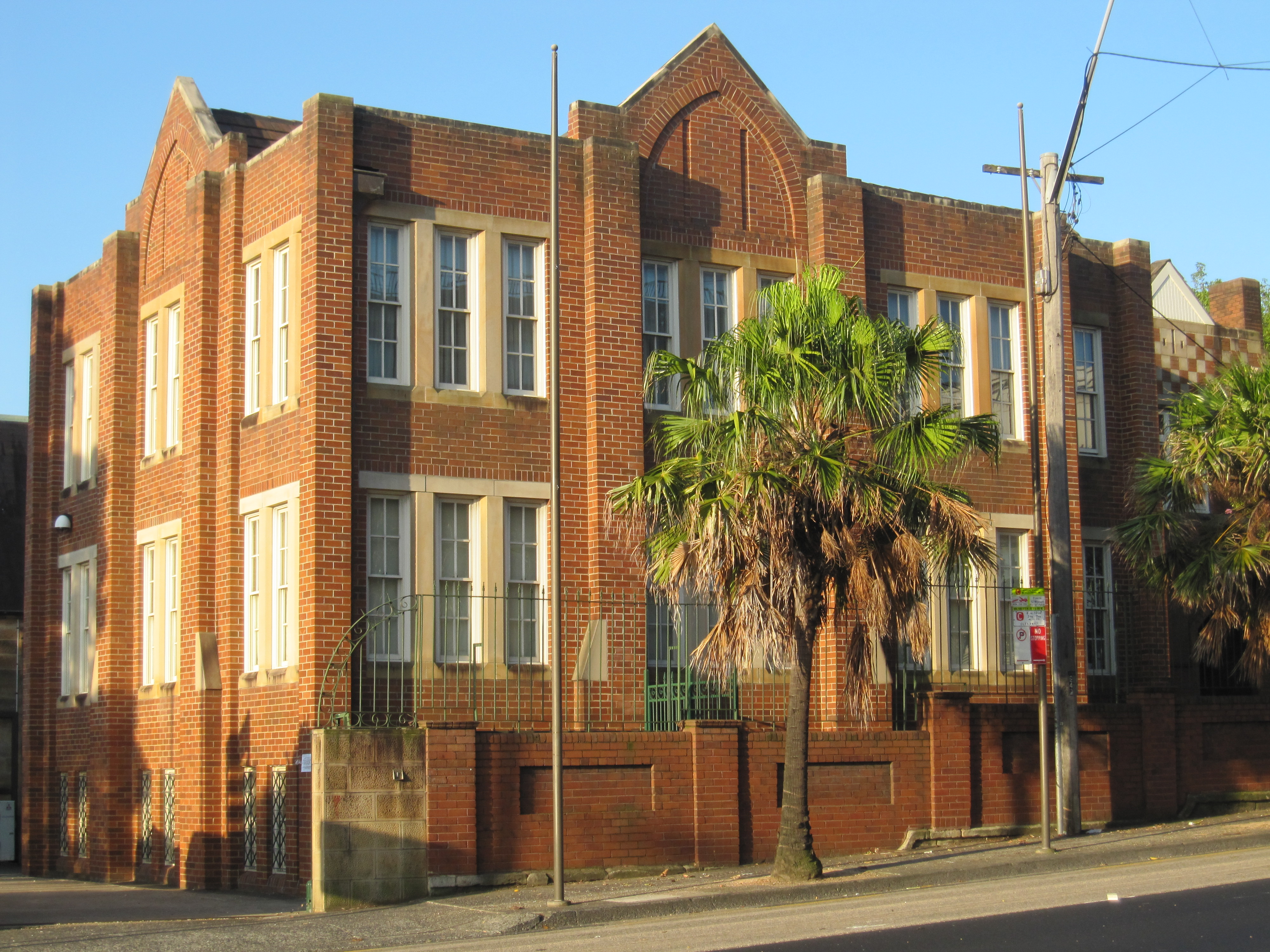
Redfern Theological College

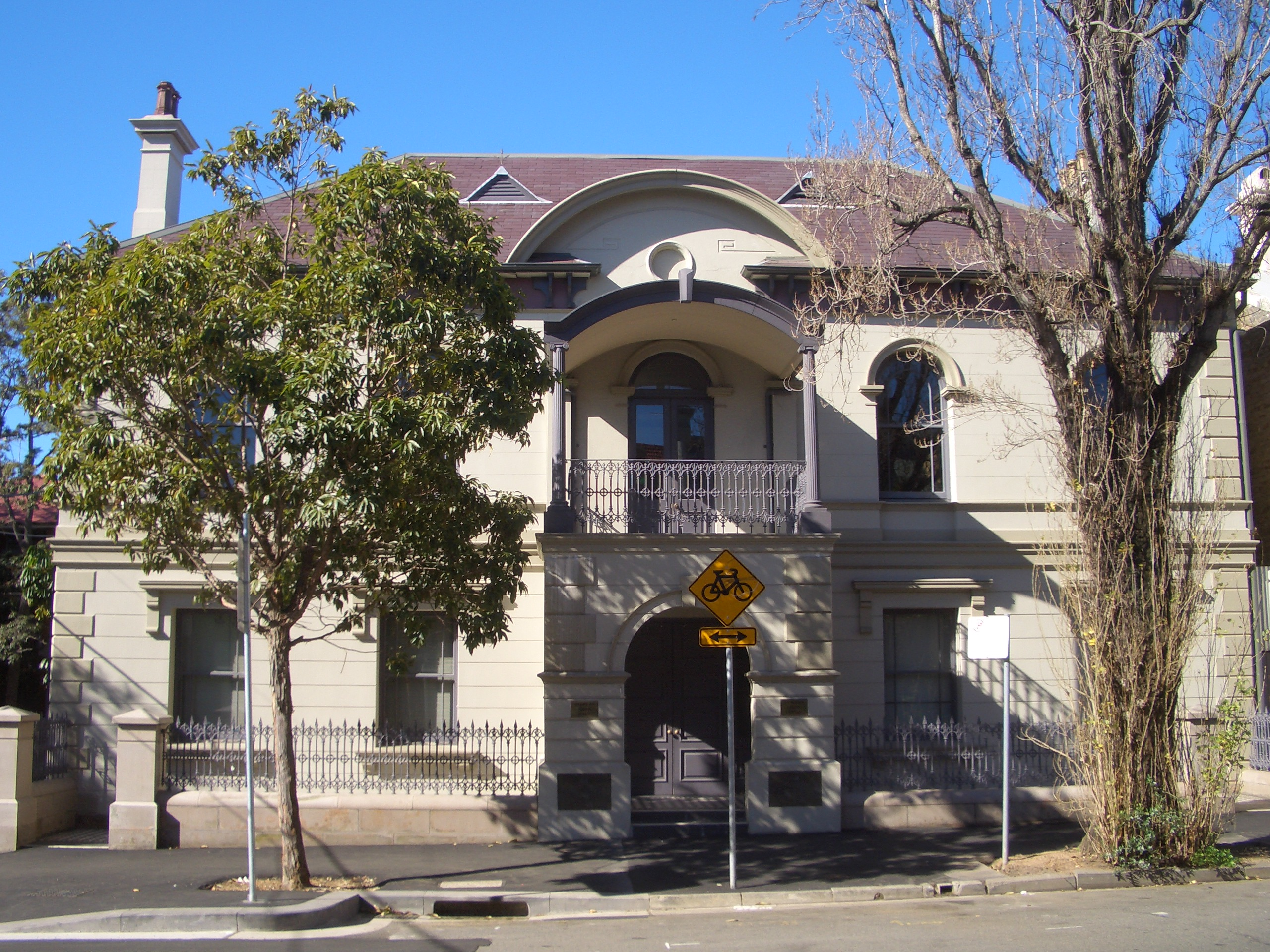
Redfern Town Hall

=== Heritage buildings ===
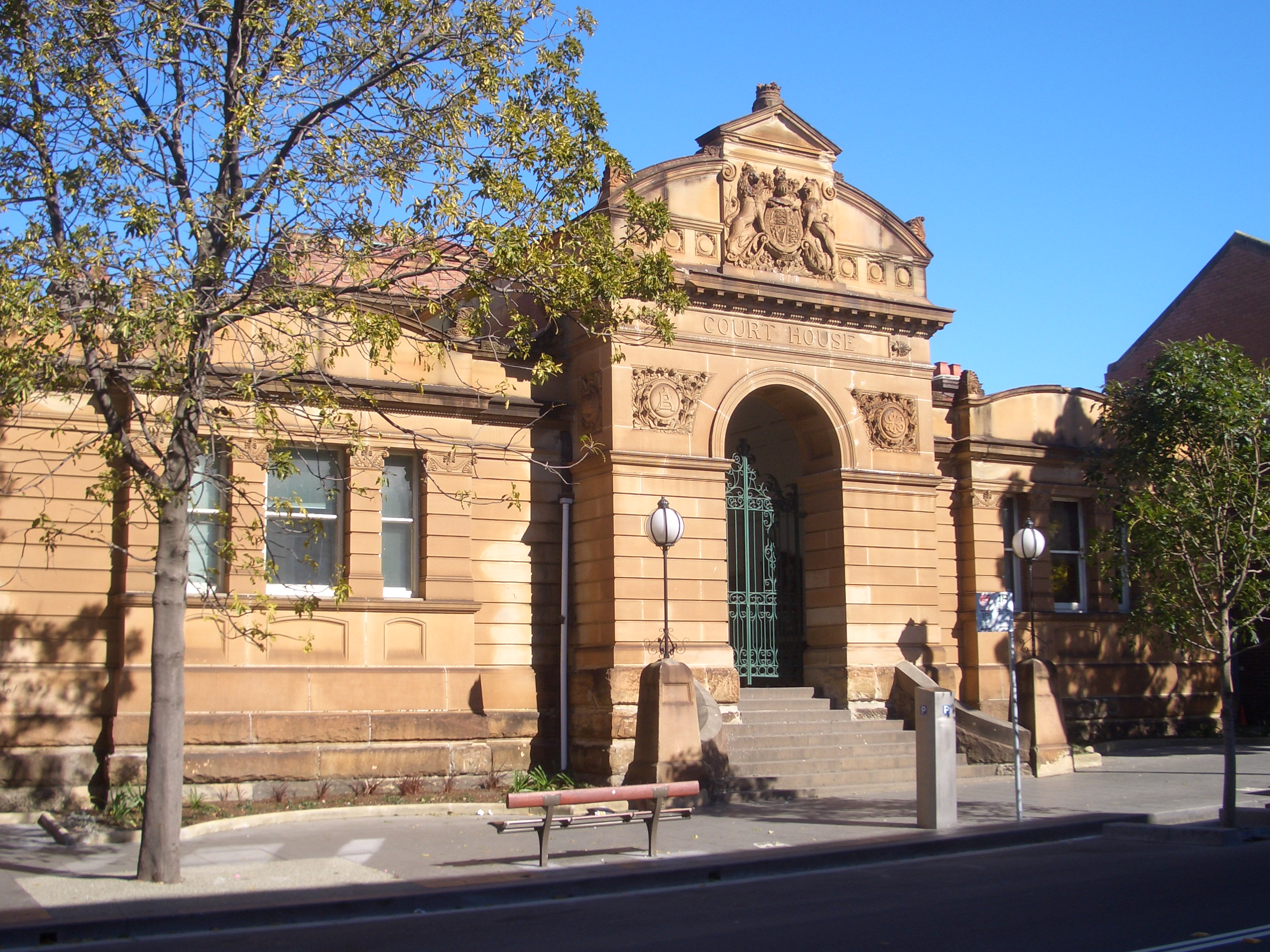
Redfern Court House

Redfern has a number of heritage-listed sites, including:

- 242 Cleveland Street: Cathedral of the Annunciation of Our Lady
- Elizabeth, Redfern, Chalmers, and Phillip Streets: Redfern Oval
- 18 George Street: Redfern Aboriginal Children's Services
- Main Suburban railway line: Eveleigh Chief Mechanical Engineer's office, Eveleigh Railway Workshops and machinery
- Main Suburban railway line: Redfern railway station
- 6–18 Pitt Street: Fitzroy Terrace, Redfern
- 113 Redfern Street: Redfern Post Office

=== Other notable buildings ===
The Aboriginal Dance Theatre Redfern is at 82–88 Renwick Street.

== Demographics ==
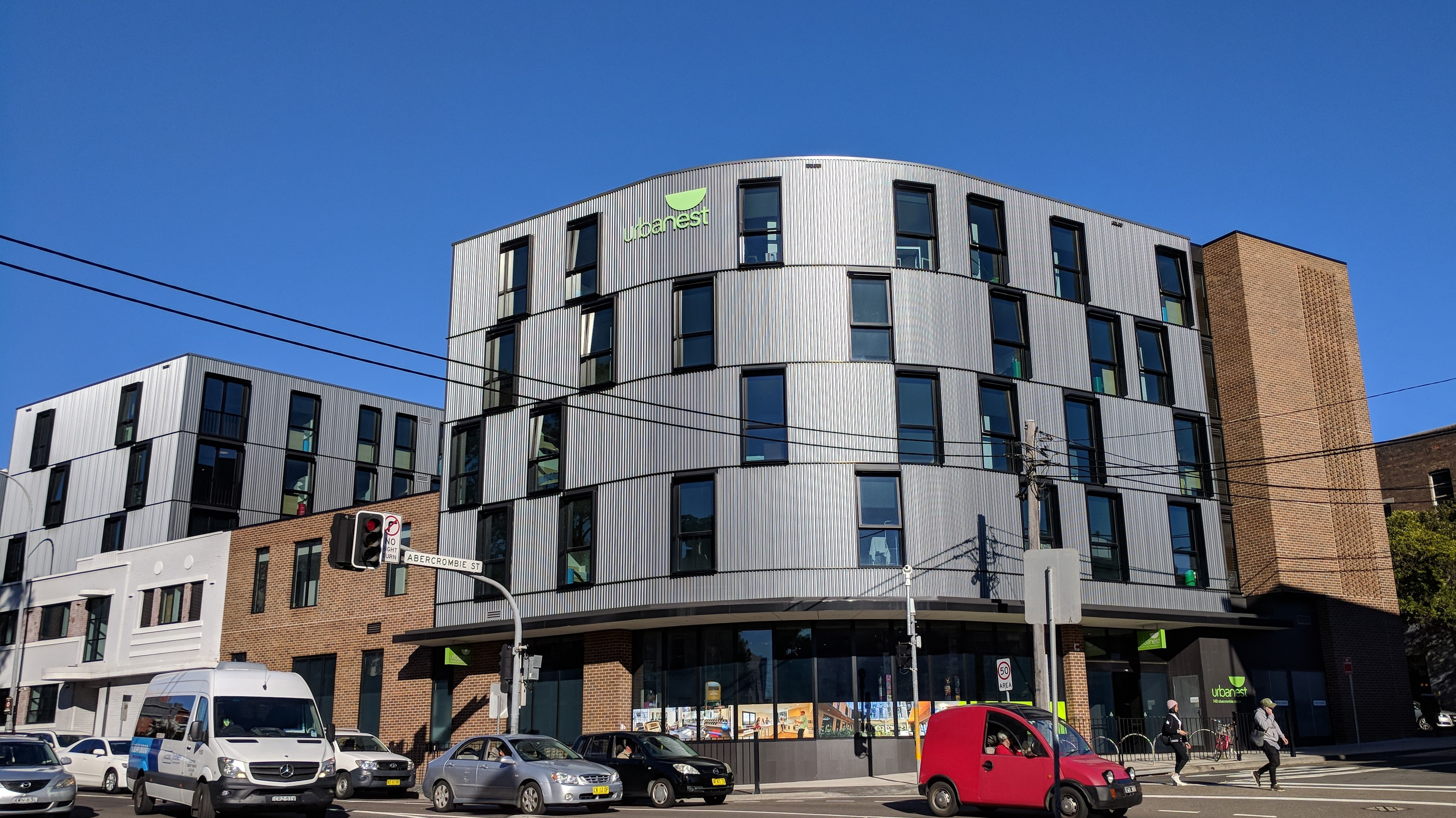
Student accommodation buildings

At the 2021 census, Redfern had a population of 13,072, compared to 14,616 at the 2016 census.

In 2021, Aboriginal and Torres Strait Islander people making up 3.2% of the population and 52.0% of the population were born overseas. The most common countries of birth were England 4.8%, China 4.3%, New Zealand 3.0%, United States of America 1.4% and India 1.4%. 65.0% of the population only spoke English at home, with the most important other languages being Mandarin (3.6%), Spanish (2.9%), Cantonese (2.1%), Greek (1.5%) and Russian (1.4%). 53.7% of the population marked no religion, higher than the national average. 14.2% were Catholic, 4.8% Anglican and 3.5% Buddhist.

Redfern has become increasingly gentrified, with many medium and high density developments replacing low density and industrial developments. In 2021, 68.1% of residences were flats and 28.6% were semi-detached, row or terrace house, townhouse etc.

Redfern has been characterised by successive migrant populations. In the late 19th century, local businessmen George Dan in 1890, Stanton and Aziz Melick in 1888 and Shafiqah Shasha and Anthony and Simon Coorey in the 1890s were from Lebanon.

== Community ==
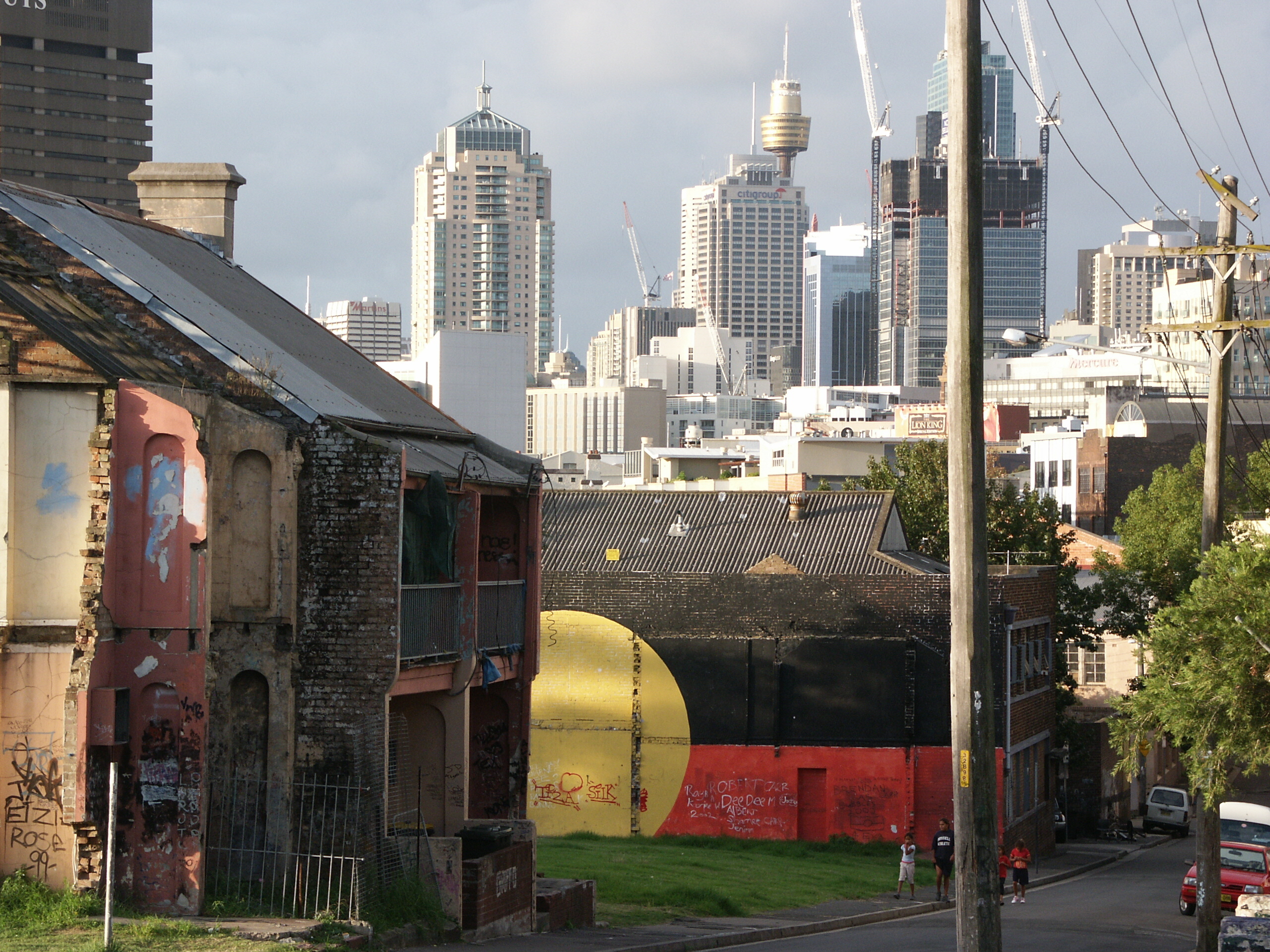
The dilapidated Eveleigh Street in 2003. The area has traditionally been characterised by urban decay and socio-economically disadvantaged residents. In more recent years however, gentrification and urban renewal has revitalised much of the area

'The Block' is an area in the immediate vicinity of Redfern station bounded by Eveleigh, Caroline, Louis and Vine Streets. The Aboriginal Housing Company (AHC) was set up as the first urban Aboriginal community housing provider, using grant money to purchase the houses on the Block. As a result, the area is important to the Aboriginal community. Eveleigh Street, which is part of 'The Block', is well known for its community. In 2004, much of the Eveleigh Street housing was demolished with plans for redevelopment.

== Sport and recreation ==
A number of sporting teams represent the local area. The South Sydney Rabbitohs NRL club was formed at the Redfern Town Hall on 17 January 1908. One of the oldest Aboriginal rugby league teams in Australia, the Redfern All Blacks, play at Redfern Oval. The Redfern Raiders Soccer Club is a local Junior Soccer Club. Redfern Gym opened in 1985 and many boxing world champions have trained there.

Nikita Ridgeway established Australia's first indigenous hip-hop record label with her brother Stephen. Called Redfern Records, the label was named after the Sydney neighbourhood of Redfern they grew up in. A wall with a mural dedicated to one of the first Women in Rugby League was painted to honour Maggie Moloney, in 2022.

== Streets and Squares ==
In the centre of Redfern is Redfern Park, a recreational and sporting area. This park was the site of the Redfern Park Speech.

The park contains the sports field Redfern Oval, which is the home to the Redfern All Blacks. It was previously the training location of the South Sydney Rabbitohs.

=== St Paul's Place ===
St Paul's Place is at the intersection of Cleveland Street and Regent Street in Redfern, bordering the suburb of Chippendale. Named in 1924, the square is the subject and title of the 1995 oil painting by Archibald prize-winning artist Nicholas Harding and is the current official place name according to the City of Sydney Spatial Services department as of 2023.

==== History ====
The square is portrayed in a number of photos held in the City of Sydney Archives.

In 1915, the site is pictured as the intersection of two tram lines. The square was officially named St Paul's Place in 1924. Correspondence relating to the naming of the intersection is documented in the Town Clerk's Department Correspondence Files between 7 October 1924 and 19 December 1924.

The site also goes by the name St Paul's Square in the Dictionary of Sydney and on the City of Sydney History of Prince Alfred Park website.

In June 1929, St Paul's place was specified as one part (of 35) in new "van stands" regulation. It was specified that the first van should park in "St. Paul's place, south side, 15 yards west of Regent-street" and the second van should park park in "St. Paul's place, south side, at Tramway pole No. 19".

On 25 January 1930, the Sydney Morning Herald reported the City Commissioners and the Main Roads Board agreed to progressively widen Cleveland Street between the Princes Highway and St Paul's Place, and between St Paul's Place and Chalmers Street. The first practical move to widen Cleveland Street (by 16 feet) from the Prince's Highway to St Paul's Place was made with the submission of plans for two new houses at a Redfern council meeting 9 November 1937, with the Main Roads Department making consideration of widening from St Paul's Place to Dowling Street (near Moore Park).

In the 1930s the road was re-aligned and resurfaced. City of Sydney archive photos depict the road before and after, however it is unclear whether the metadata specifies a date of 1939 or 1933. Towards the south-east a Shell Service Station and the Camden Vale Milk Co Ltd building is visible in these photos and described in the captions.

In 1954 a nameplate was installed bearing the name, along with four directional signs to St Pauls Church (now named Cathedral of the Annunciation of Our Lady).

A 1980 photograph depicted heavy traffic, and political graffiti where advertisements are currently located.

In 1991 the square was named in multiple photographs, one mentioning the road being widened and one stating "The intersection has been widened so that the traffic crossing Cleveland Street get a straighter flow."

The place has been used to specify the corner of council ward boundaries over multiple years. For example, it defined Phillip Ward in February 1950, Redfern Ward in April 1950, Philip and Redfern in 1961, the Chippendale subdivision in 1966, Newtown Ward in 1969, and Redfern in 1984.

==== Depictions in art ====
Between 1993 and 1995, Archibald prize winning artist Nicholas Harding created the painting titled "St Paul's Place, Redfern" using oil on canvas on hardboard. It was most recently exhibited at the S.H Ervin gallery in The Rocks, in the exhibition "Margaret Olley: painter, peer, mentor, muse" in 2017. It is listed in the collection of the Art Gallery of New South Wales.

==== Depictions in maps ====
The City of Sydney Aerial Photographic Survey of 1949 displays photographs 82 and 83 with St Pauls Place in the title.The 1939–1952 City of Sydney Civic Survey depicts St Paul's Place on the map of Redfern (Map 18).

The Environmental Impact Statement of the 1987 Pyrmont-Alexandria Traffic Management Proposal (also known as the Redfern one-way paired road or Southern Arterial) refers to the area as St. Paul's Place and includes several maps. Fig 3.10b ("The Existing Visual Environment St. Pauls Place") records a "Focus on city views" to the north-east and "Renovated building reinforces historical them of intersection" to the west. Figure 2.2b included a "Detail Plan" of the "Extended Bridge Deck" as part of the proposal. Figure 5.1b(ii) "Landscape Treatment St. Pauls Place" included "...shrub planting carried out along front of building to create a forecourt area with seating and pedestrian provisions".

==== Future ====
The Redfern Estate Heritage Conservation Area page on the Department of Planning and Environment website in 2021 stated that recommended management included "Interpret original subdivision of Redfern Estate, and St Pauls Place" under "Protection of Significance", and "Interpret St. Pauls Place" under "Enhance Significance of Area".

== In popular culture ==
The 2011 Australian drama series Underbelly: Razor and 2012 Australian drama series Redfern Now were filmed on location in Redfern.

== Notable people ==
- Col James (1936–2013), architect and activist
- Sydney Sim (1920–1990), second World War signalman
- Neddy Smith (1944–2021), one of Australia's most famous criminals, associated with NSW police corruption
- The Kid Laroi (2003–), Australian singer-songwriter and rapper

== See also ==
- Aboriginal Dance Theatre Redfern
- Aboriginal Legal Service (NSW/ACT)
- Redfern Oval
- Redfern Town Hall
- Redfern Legal Centre
- Redfern All Blacks
- Redfern Now
- Story Factory
- Tribal Warrior
