= Sydney Sim =

- Born: 24 May 1920; Redfern, New South Wales, Australia
- Died: 17 August 1990 (aged 70); Sydney, Australia
- Military career
- Allegiance: Australia
- Branch: Australian Army
- Service years: 1942–1945
- Rank: Signalman
- Nickname: "Signalman Sim"
- Conflicts: Second World War; Battle of Singapore
- Awards: British Empire Medal

Sydney Sim BEM (24 May 1920 – 17 August 1990) was an Australian recipient of the British Empire Medal, the decoration awarded to members of the British and Commonwealth armed forces for meritorious civil or military service worthy of recognition by the Crown. Nicknamed "Signalman Sim", Sydney Sim was awarded the British Empire Medal for his role in facilitating and building - at considerable personal risk - hidden radios at the Changi Prisoner of War Camp in Singapore, during the 2nd World War.

== Service at the Battle of Singapore ==
By early 1941 the threat of war with Japan loomed and the Australian Army began to organise its divisional strength in Australia and South East Asia in response. The 8th Australian Division was in development at this time and became part of the Australian preparation for war with Japan. Due to his engineering expertise Sydney Sim was placed into the 8th Division with the rank of signalman.
