= Redfern Town Hall =

Venue in Sydney, Australia

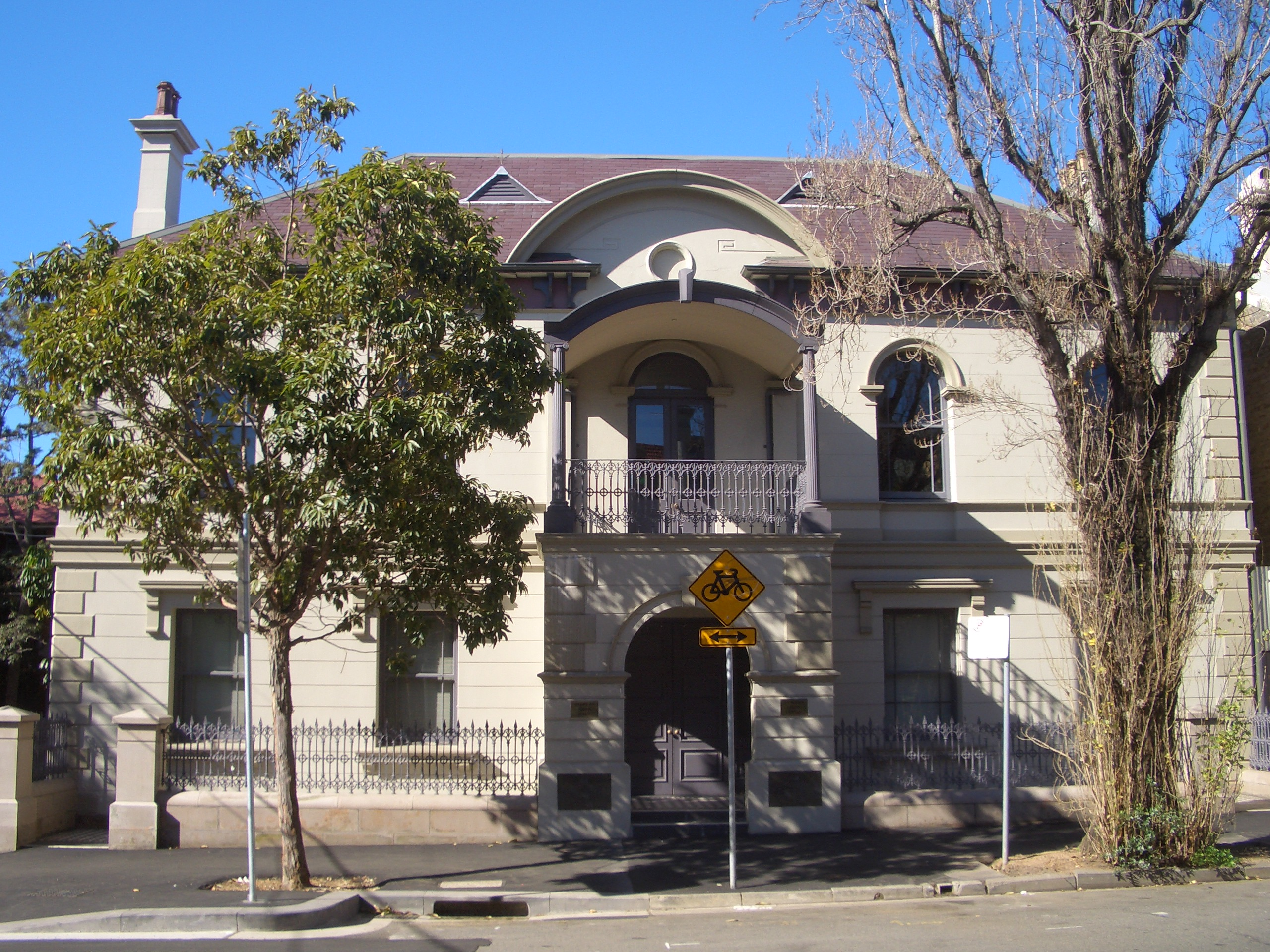

- Location within Sydney

General information
- Status: Completed
- Type: Government town hall
- Architectural style: Victorian Regency
- Location: 73 Pitt Street, Redfern, New South Wales, Australia
- Coordinates: 33°53′32″S 151°12′15″E
- Completed: 1870
- Client: Redfern Municipal Council
- Owner: City of Sydney (current)

Design and construction
- Architect: George Allen Mansfield

The Redfern Town Hall is a landmark sandstone civic building located in the heart of Redfern, New South Wales, Australia. built in 1870 and designed in the Victorian Regency style by George Allen Mansfield. It was the seat of the Municipality of Redfern from 1870 to 1948. It stands at 73 Pitt Street, Redfern.

== History and description ==
On 10 May 1904, the local Member for Redfern and Leader of the NSW Labor Party, James McGowen, launched the State Labor Party's 1904 election campaign at the Town Hall.Redfern Town Hall was the site of a meeting of Rugby league players in 1908, at which the South Sydney District Rugby League Football Club, now the South Sydney Rabbitohs, was officially formed. when administrator J J Giltinan, cricketer Victor Trumper and politician Henry Hoyle came together in front of a large crowd of supporters. On 7 August 1968 Redfern Town Hall was the site of the Chief Commissioner of Sydney Vernon Treatt's proclamation of the Municipality of Northcott (later the South Sydney City Council). When the Redfern Legal Centre was established in March 1977, South Sydney Council offered the town hall rent-free and it has been its home since then. The town hall was restored in the 1990s and in 2000 it was placed on the City of Sydney Local Environmental Plan as a part of the Redfern Estate Heritage Conservation Area as well as an individual heritage item.

== Gallery ==
Town Hall in 1871, first Mayor George Renwick is standing on the balcony.

Redfern Town Hall in 2008.

== See also ==
- List of town halls in Sydney
- Architecture of Sydney
