= History of Australia =

The Commonwealth of Australia was proclaimed on 1 January 1901 as a federation of six self-governing former British colonies. The human history of Australia, however, commences with the arrival of the first ancestors of Aboriginal Australians from Maritime Southeast Asia between 50,000 and 65,000 years ago, and continues to the present multicultural democracy.

Aboriginal Australians settled throughout continental Australia and many nearby islands. The artistic, musical and spiritual traditions they established are among the longest surviving in human history. The ancestors of today's ethnically and culturally distinct Torres Strait Islanders arrived from what is now Papua New Guinea around 2,500 years ago, and settled the islands on the northern tip of the Australian landmass.

Dutch navigators explored the western and southern coasts in the 17th century and named the continent New Holland. Macassan trepangers visited Australia's northern coasts from around 1720, and possibly earlier. In 1770, Lieutenant James Cook charted the east coast of Australia and claimed it for Great Britain. He returned to London with accounts favouring colonisation at Botany Bay. The First Fleet of British ships arrived at Sydney Cove in January 1788 and established a penal colony. In the century that followed, the British established other colonies on the continent, and European explorers ventured into its interior. This period saw a decline in the Aboriginal population and the disruption of their cultures due to introduced diseases, violent conflict and dispossession of their traditional lands. From 1871, the Torres Strait Islanders welcomed Christian Missionaries, and the islands were later annexed by Queensland, choosing to remain a part of Australia when Papua New Guinea gained independence from Australia a century later.

Gold rushes and agricultural industries brought prosperity. Transportation of British convicts to Australia was phased out from 1840 to 1868. Autonomous parliamentary democracies began to be established throughout the six British colonies from the mid-19th century. The colonies voted by referendum to unite in a federation in 1901, and modern Australia came into being. Australia fought as part of British Empire and later Commonwealth in the two world wars and was to become a long-standing ally of the United States through the Cold War to the present. Trade with Asia increased and a post-war immigration program received more than 7 million migrants from every continent. Supported by immigration of people from almost every country in the world since the end of World War II, the population increased to more than 25.5 million by 2021, with 30 per cent of the population born overseas.

== Indigenous prehistory ==
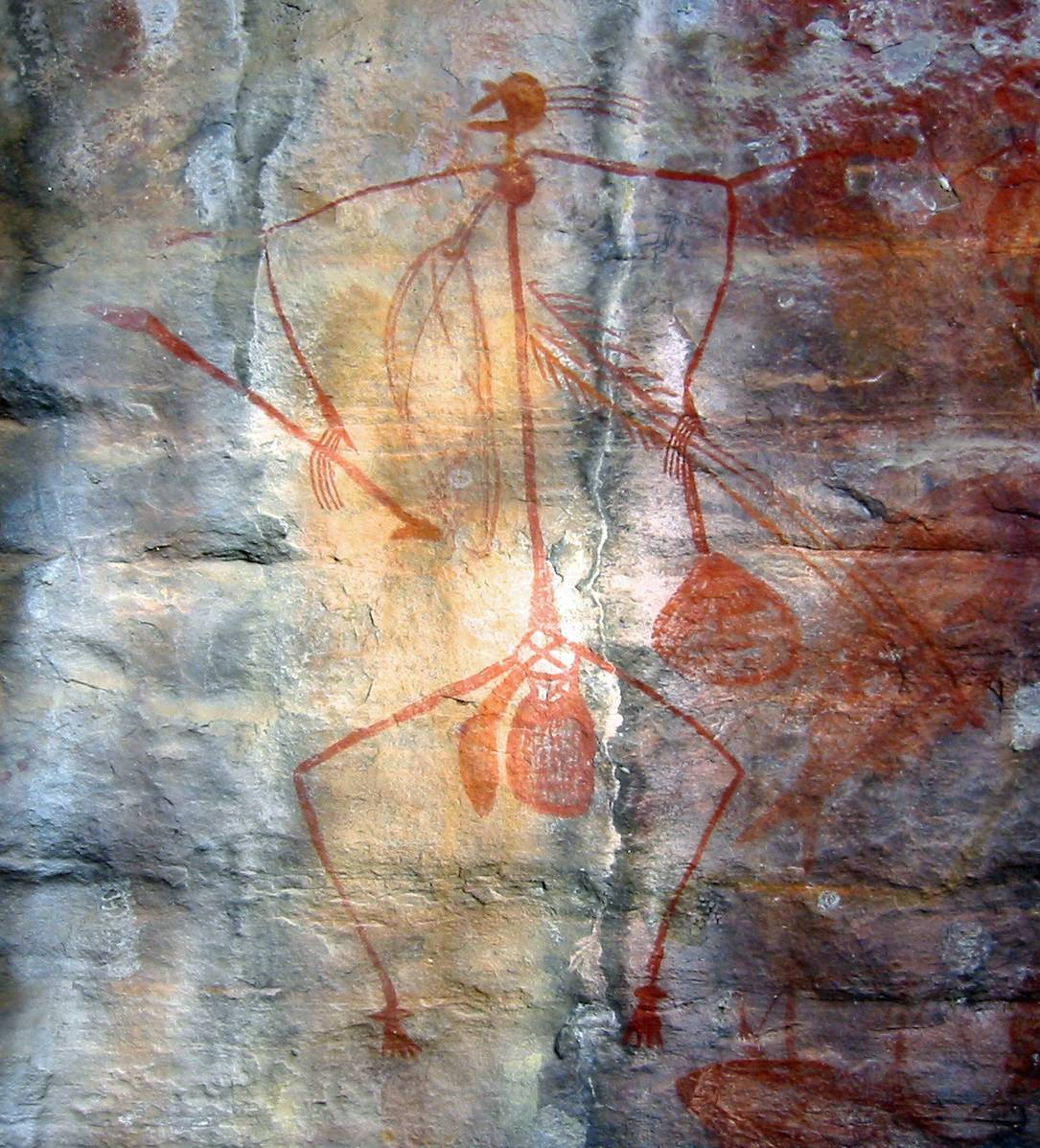
Rock painting at Ubirr in Kakadu National Park. Evidence of Aboriginal art in Australia can be traced back some 30,000 years.

The ancestors of Aboriginal Australians moved into what is now the Australian continent about 50,000 to 65,000 years ago, during the last glacial period, arriving by land bridges and short sea crossings from what is now Southeast Asia.

The Madjedbebe rock shelter in Arnhem Land, in the north of the continent, is perhaps the oldest site of human occupation in Australia. From the north, the population spread into a range of very different environments. Devil's Lair in the extreme south-west of the continent was occupied around 47,000 years ago and Tasmania by 39,000 years ago. The oldest human remains found are at Lake Mungo in New South Wales, which have been dated to around 41,000 years ago. The site suggests one of the world's oldest known cremations, indicating early evidence for religious ritual among humans.

The spread of the population also altered the environment. From 46,000 years ago, fire-stick farming was used in many parts of Australia to clear vegetation, make travel easier, and create open grasslands rich in animal and vegetable food sources.

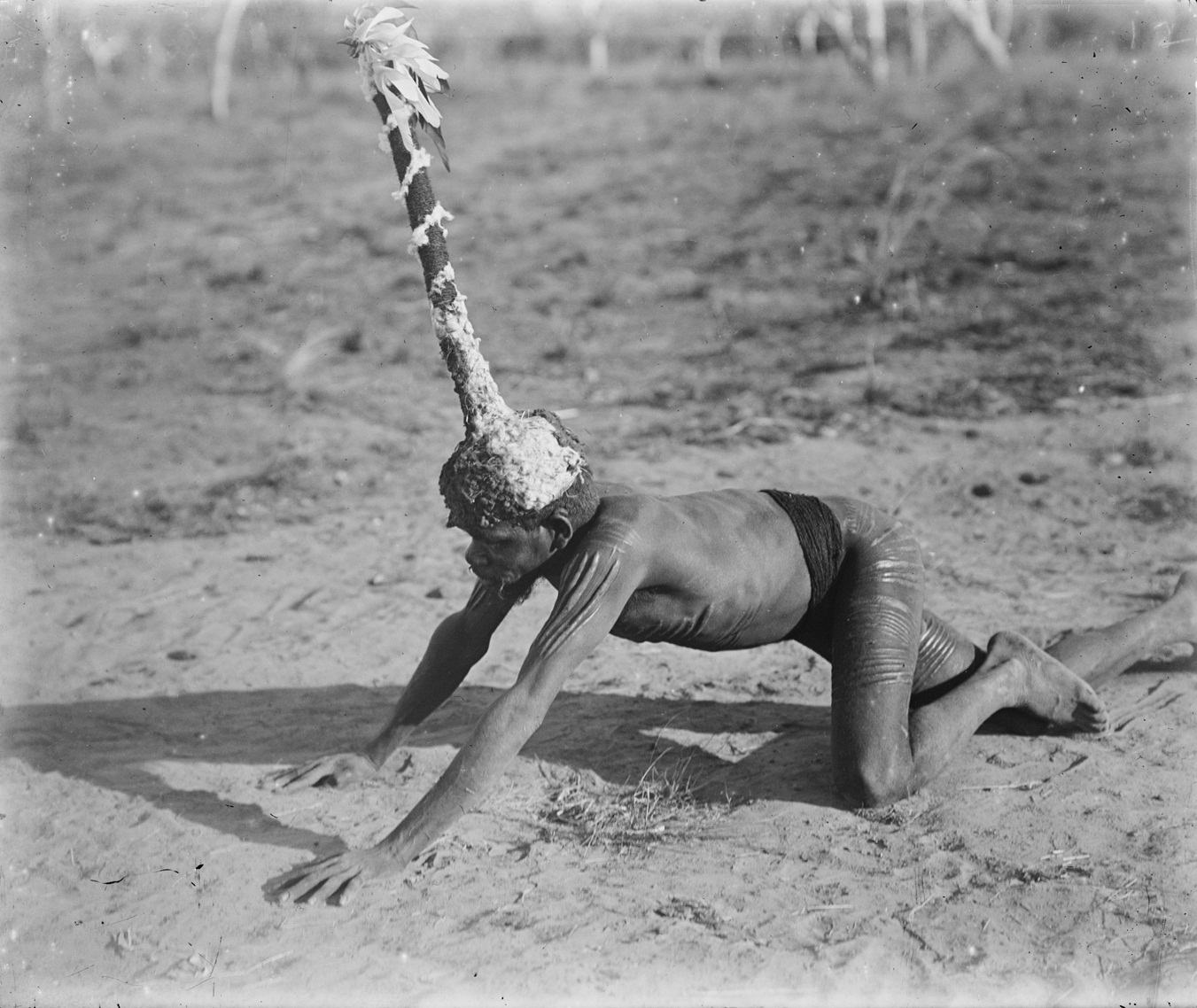
Kolaia man wearing a headdress worn in a fire ceremony, Forrest River, Western Australia. Aboriginal Australian religious practices associated with the Dreaming have been practised for tens of thousands of years.

The Aboriginal population faced significant changes in the climate and environment. About 30,000 years ago, sea levels began to fall, temperatures in the south-east of the continent dropped by as much as 9 °C (16 °F), and the interior of Australia became more arid. About 20,000 years ago, New Guinea and Tasmania were connected to the Australian continent, which was more than a quarter larger than today.

About 19,000 years ago temperatures and sea levels began to rise. Tasmania became separated from the mainland some 14,000 years ago, and between 8,000 and 6,000 years ago thousands of islands in the Torres Strait and around the coast of Australia were formed.

The warmer climate was associated with new technologies. Small back-bladed stone tools appeared 15–19 thousand years ago. Wooden javelins and boomerangs have been found dating from 10,000 years ago. Stone points for spears have been found dating from 5–7 thousand years ago. Spear throwers were probably developed more recently than 6,500 years ago.

Aboriginal Tasmanians were isolated from the mainland from about 14,000 years ago. As a result, they only possessed one quarter of the tools and equipment of the adjacent mainland. Coastal Tasmanians switched from fish to abalone and crayfish and more Tasmanians moved to the interior.

About 4,000 years ago, the first phase of occupation of the Torres Strait Islands began. By 2,500 years ago more of the islands were occupied and a distinctive Torres Strait Islander maritime culture emerged. Agriculture also developed on some islands and by 700 years ago villages appeared.

Aboriginal society consisted of family groups organised into bands and clans averaging about 25 people, each with a defined territory for foraging. Clans were attached to tribes or nations, associated with particular languages and country. At the time of European contact there were about 600 such groups and 250 distinct languages with various dialects. Estimates of the Aboriginal population at this time range from 300,000 to one million.

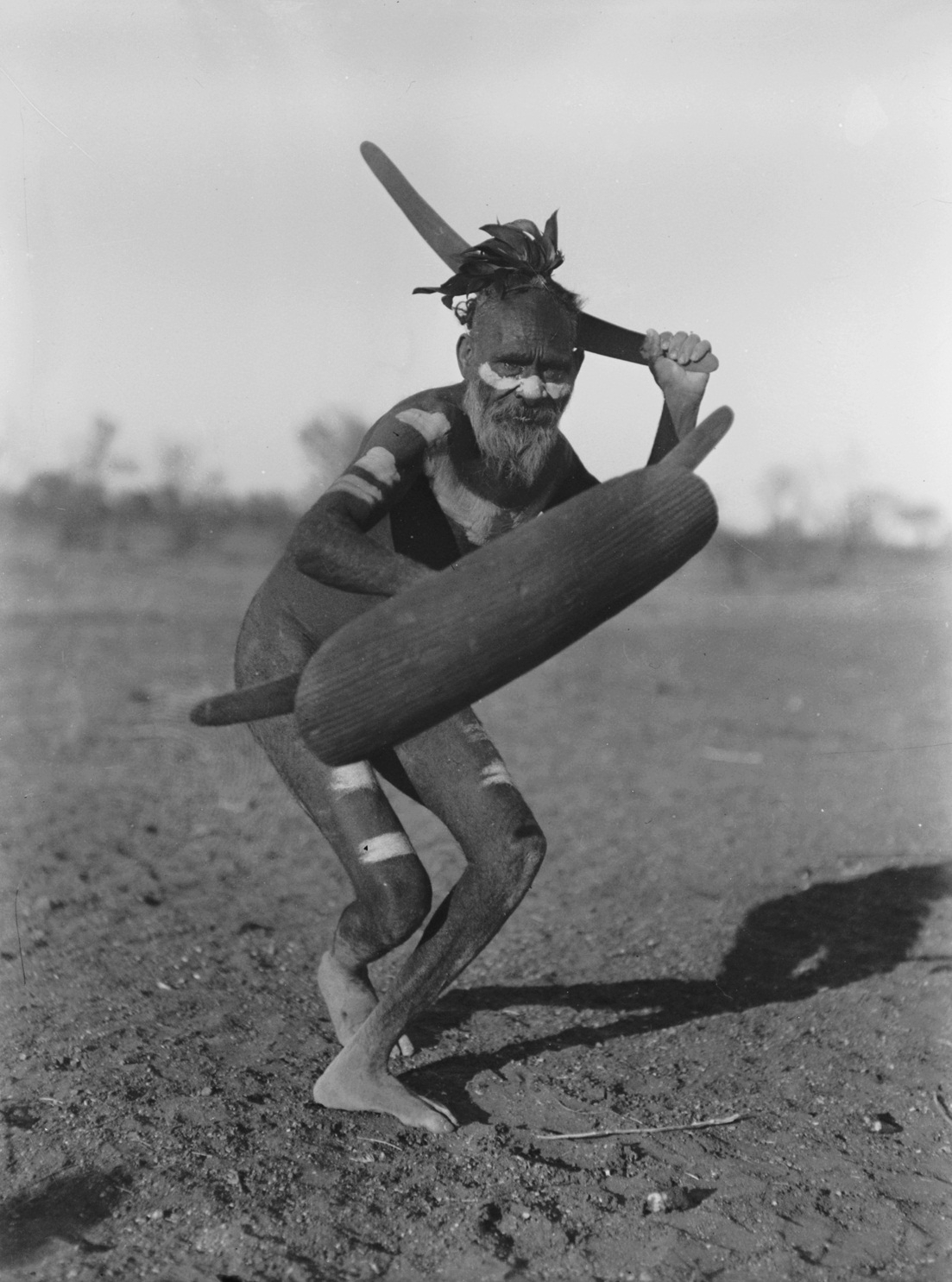
A Luritja man demonstrating his method of attack with a large curved boomerang under cover of a thin shield (1920)

Aboriginal society was egalitarian with no formal government or chiefs. Authority rested with elders and group decisions were generally made through the consensus of elders. The traditional economy was cooperative, with males generally hunting large game while females gathered local staples such as small animals, shellfish, vegetables, fruits, seeds and nuts. Food was shared within groups and exchanged across groups. Some Aboriginal groups engaged in fire-stick farming, fish farming, and built semi-permanent shelters. The extent to which some groups engaged in agriculture is controversial. Some anthropologists describe traditional Aboriginal Australia as a "complex hunter-gatherer" society.

Aboriginal groups were semi-nomadic, generally ranging over a specific territory defined by natural features. Members of a group would enter the territory of another group through rights established by marriage and kinship or by invitation for specific purposes such as ceremonies and sharing abundant seasonal foods. As Aboriginal people believed all natural features of the land were created by ancestral beings, a group's particular country provided physical and spiritual nourishment.

Aboriginal Australians developed a unique artistic and spiritual culture. The earliest Aboriginal rock art consists of hand-prints, hand-stencils, and engravings of circles, tracks, lines and cupules, and has been dated to 35,000 years ago. Around 20,000 year ago Aboriginal artists were depicting humans and animals. According to Australian Aboriginal mythology and the animist framework, the Dreaming is a sacred era in which ancestral totemic spirit beings formed The Creation. The Dreaming established the laws and structures of society and the ceremonies performed to ensure continuity of life and land.

== Early European exploration ==
=== Dutch discovery and exploration ===
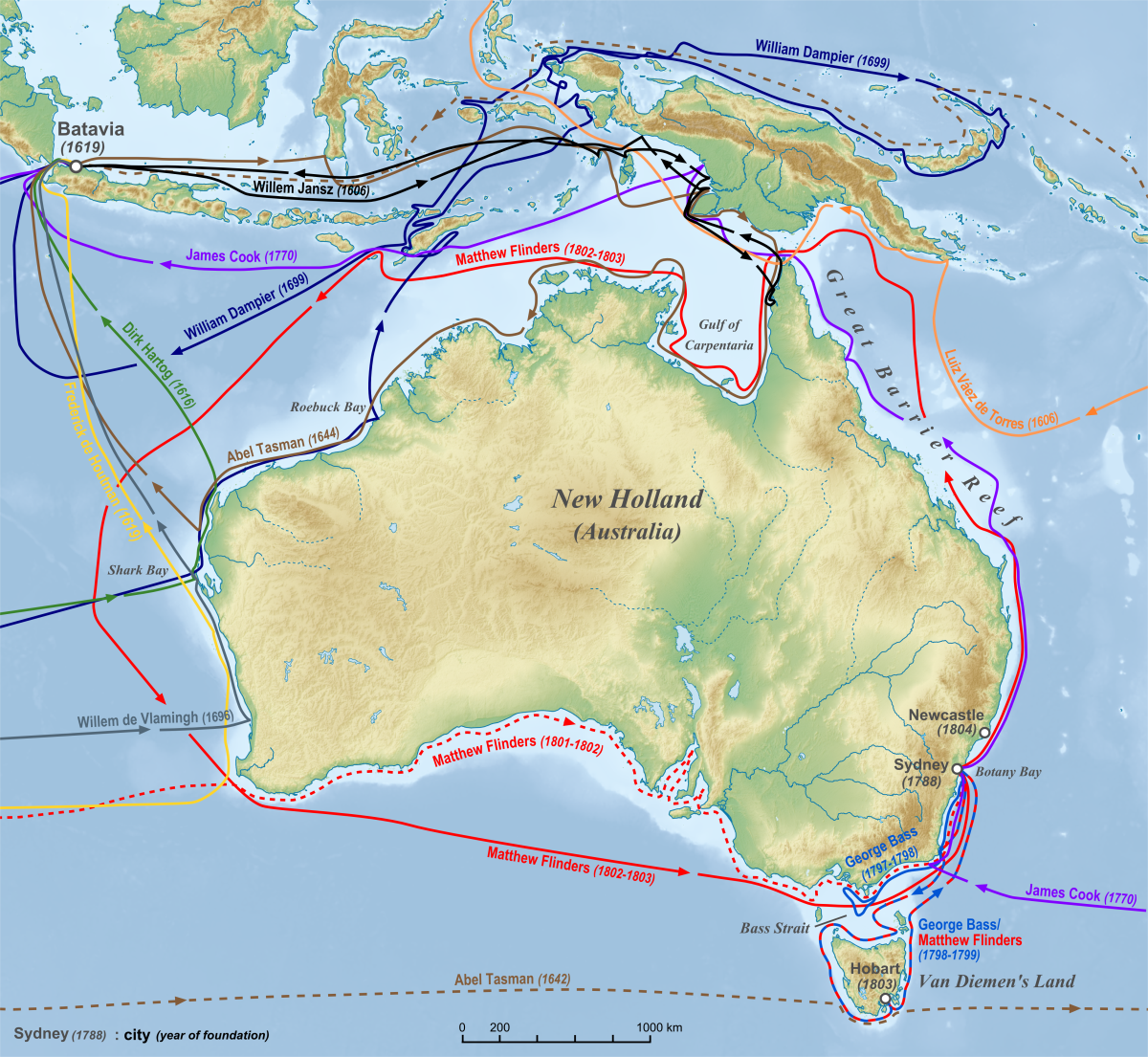
Exploration by Europeans until 1812: 1606 Willem Janszoon 1606 Luis Vaez de Torres 1616 Dirk Hartog 1619 Frederick de Houtman 1644 Abel Tasman 1696 Willem de Vlamingh 1699 William Dampier 1770 James Cook 1797–99 George Bass 1801–03 Matthew Flinders

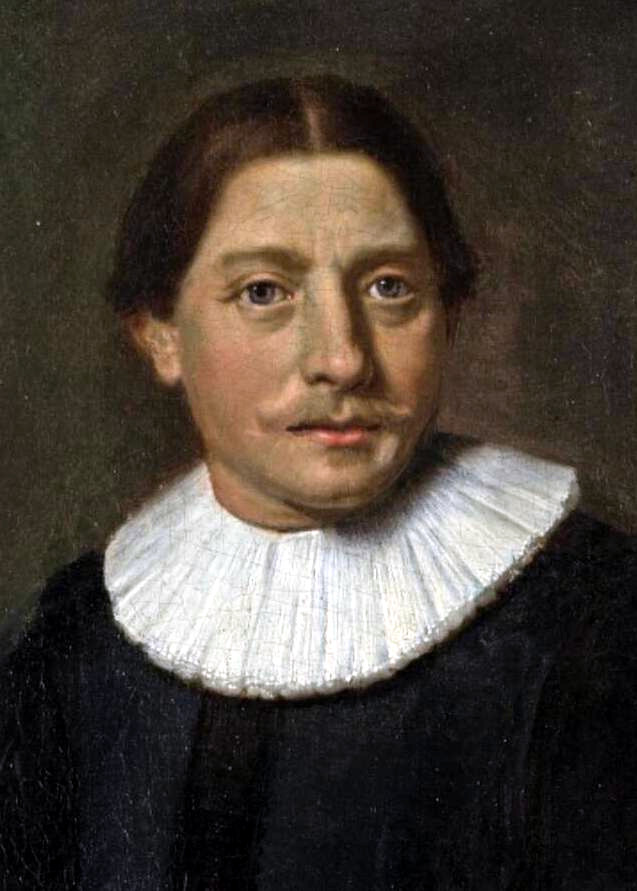
Abel Tasman, whose expedition of two ships was the first European expedition to discover Van Diemen's Land, now known as Tasmania

The Dutch East India Company ship, Duyfken, captained by Willem Janszoon, made the first documented European landing in Australia in 1606. Later that year, Luís Vaz de Torres sailed to the north of Australia through Torres Strait, along New Guinea's southern coast.

In 1616, Dirk Hartog, sailing off course, en route from the Cape of Good Hope to Batavia, landed on an island off Shark Bay, Western Australia. In 1622–23 the ship Leeuwin made the first recorded rounding of the southwest corner of the continent.

In 1627, the south coast of Australia was discovered by François Thijssen and named after Pieter Nuyts. In 1628, a squadron of Dutch ships explored the northern coast particularly in the Gulf of Carpentaria.

Abel Tasman's voyage of 1642 was the first known European expedition to reach Van Diemen's Land (later Tasmania) and New Zealand, and to sight Fiji. On his second voyage of 1644, he also contributed significantly to the mapping of the Australian mainland (which he called New Holland), making observations on the land and people of the north coast below New Guinea.

Following Tasman's voyages, the Dutch were able to make almost complete maps of Australia's northern and western coasts and much of its southern and south-eastern Tasmanian coasts.

=== British and French exploration ===
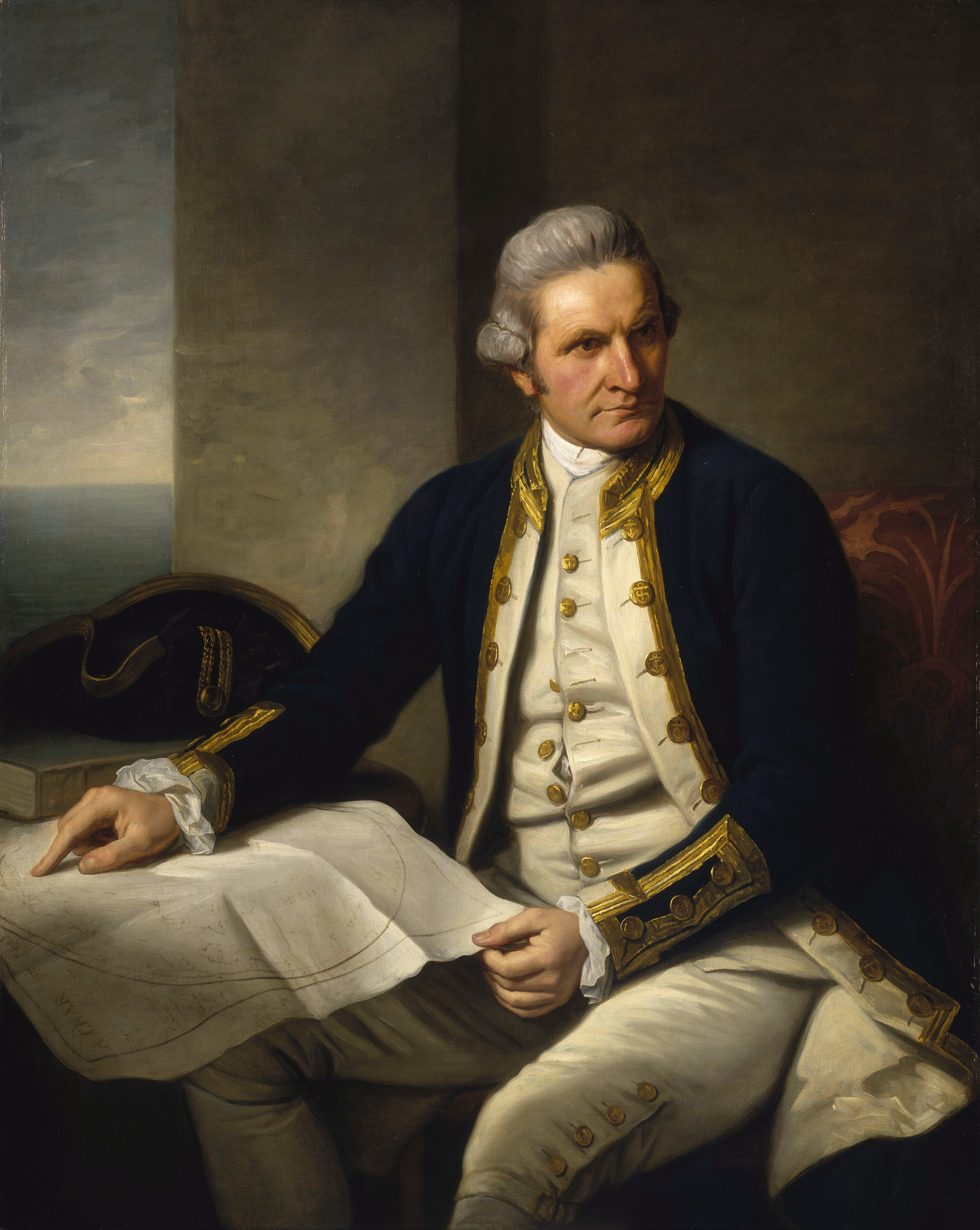
Lieutenant James Cook, the first European to map the eastern coastline of Australia in 1770

William Dampier, an English buccaneer and explorer, landed on the north-west coast of New Holland in 1688 and again in 1699, and published influential descriptions of the Aboriginal people.

In 1769, Lieutenant James Cook in command of HMS Endeavour, travelled to Tahiti to observe and record the transit of Venus. Cook also carried secret Admiralty instructions to locate the supposed Southern Continent. Unable to find this continent, Cook decided to survey the east coast of New Holland, the only major part of that continent that had not been charted by Dutch navigators.

On 19 April 1770, Endeavour reached the east coast of New Holland and ten days later anchored at Botany Bay. Cook charted the coast to its northern extent and formally took possession of the east coast of New Holland on 21/22 August 1770 when on Possession Island off the west coast of Cape York Peninsula.

He noted in his journal that he could;

land no more upon this Eastern coast of New Holland, and on the Western side I can make no new discovery the honour of which belongs to the Dutch Navigators ~~and as such they may lay Claim to it as their property~~ (Note: Words crossed out in the original.) but the Eastern Coast from the Latitude of 38 South down to this place I am confident was never seen or viseted by any European before us and ~~therefore by the same Rule belongs to great Brittan~~ [...].

In March 1772 Marc-Joseph Marion du Fresne, in command of two French ships, reached Van Diemen's land on his way to Tahiti and the South Seas. His party became the first recorded European to encounter the Indigenous Tasmanians and to kill one of them.

In the same year, a French expedition led by Louis Aleno de St Aloüarn, became the first European to formally claim sovereignty over the west coast of Australia, but no attempt was made to follow this with colonisation.

== Colonisation ==
=== Plans for colonisation before 1788 ===
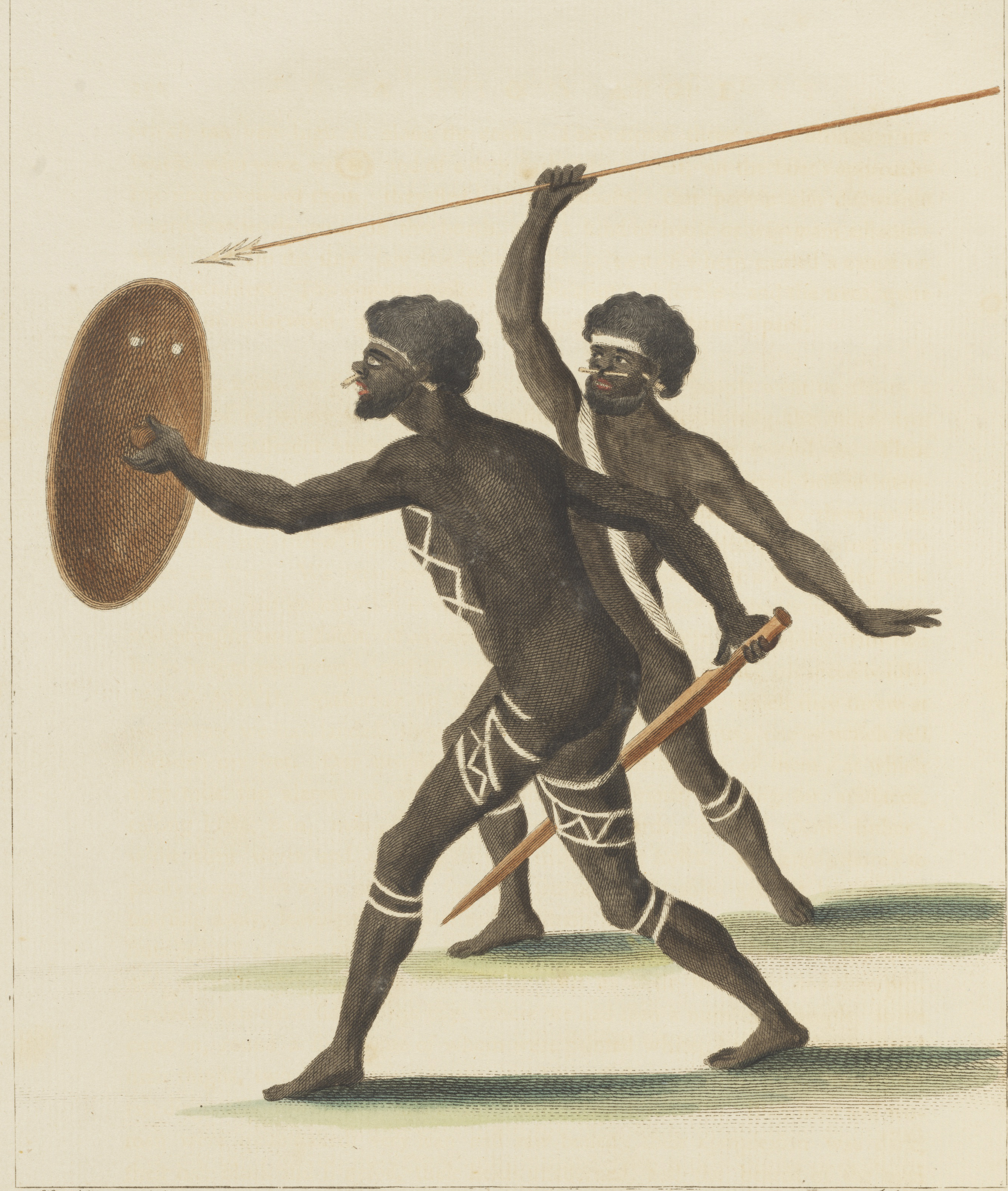
Two of the Natives of New Holland, Advancing To Combat (1784), lithograph based on 1770 sketch by Cook's illustrator Sydney Parkinson

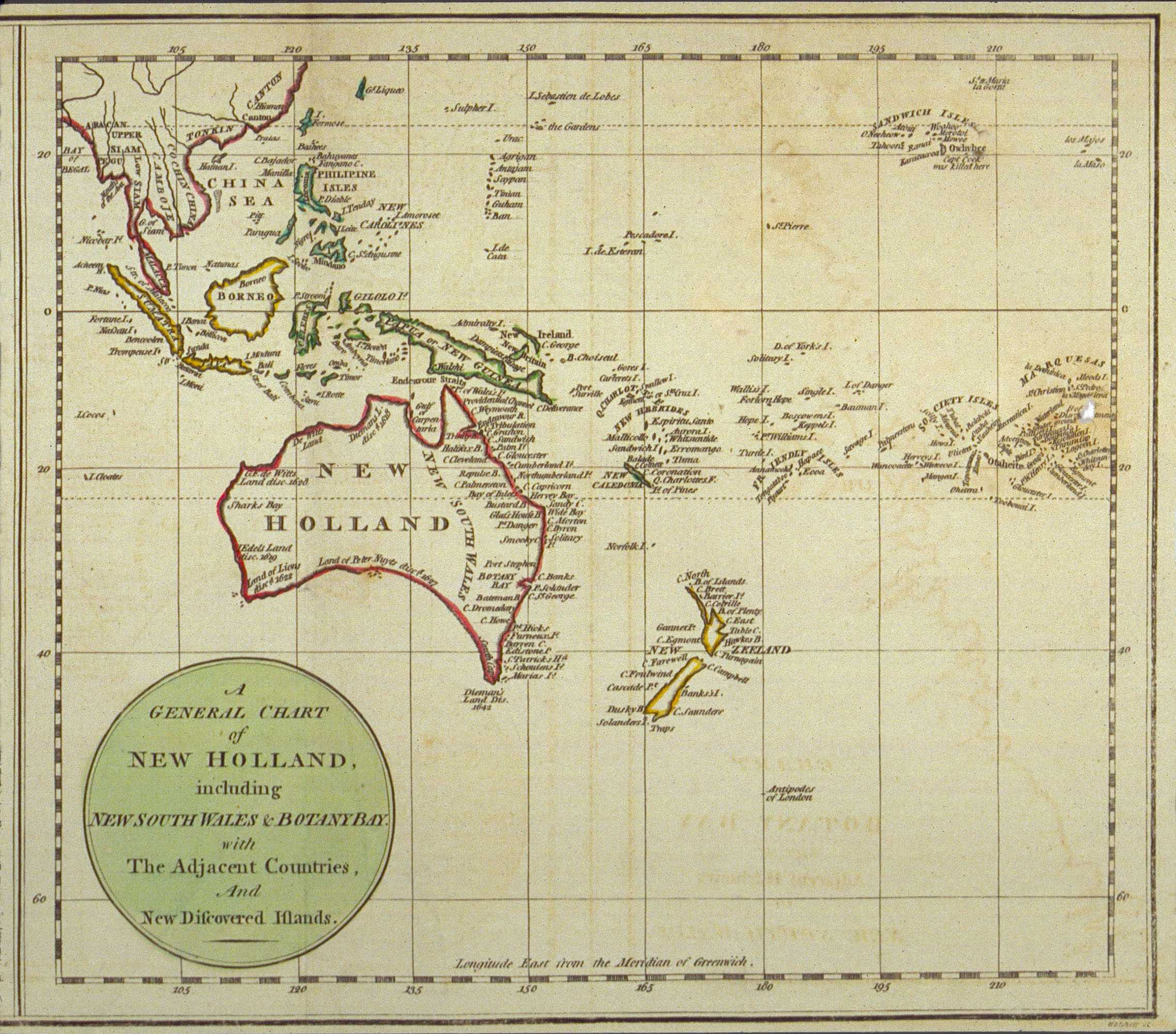
A General Chart of New Holland including New South Wales & Botany Bay with The Adjacent Countries and New Discovered Lands, published in An Historical Narrative of the Discovery of New Holland and New South Wales, London, Fielding and Stockdale, November 1786

Although various proposals for the colonisation of Australia were made prior to 1788, none were attempted. In 1717, Jean-Pierre Purry sent a plan to the Dutch East India Company for the colonisation of an area in modern South Australia. The company rejected the plan with the comment that, "There is no prospect of use or benefit to the Company in it, but rather very certain and heavy costs".

In contrast, Emanuel Bowen, in 1747, promoted the benefits of exploring and colonising the country, writing:

It is impossible to conceive a Country that promises fairer from its Situation than this of TERRA AUSTRALIS, no longer incognita, as this Map demonstrates, but the Southern Continent Discovered. It lies precisely in the richest climates of the World... and therefore whoever perfectly discovers and settles it will become infalliably possessed of Territories as Rich, as fruitful, and as capable of Improvement, as any that have hitherto been found out, either in the East Indies or the West.

John Harris, in his Navigantium atque Itinerantium Bibliotheca, or Voyages and Travels (1744–1748, 1764) recommended exploration of the east coast of New Holland, with a view to a British colonisation. John Callander put forward a proposal in 1766 for Britain to found a colony of banished convicts in the South Sea or in Terra Australis. Sweden's King Gustav III had ambitions to establish a colony for his country at the Swan River in 1786 but the plan was stillborn.

The American Revolutionary War (1775–1783) saw Britain lose most of its North American colonies and consider establishing replacement territories. Britain had transported about 50,000 convicts to the New World from 1718 to 1775 and was now searching for an alternative. The temporary solution of floating prison hulks had reached capacity and was a public health hazard, while the option of building more jails and workhouses was deemed too expensive.

In 1779, Sir Joseph Banks, the eminent scientist who had accompanied James Cook on his 1770 voyage, recommended Botany Bay as a suitable site for a penal settlement. Banks's plan was to send 200 to 300 convicts to Botany Bay where they could be left to their own devices and not be a burden on the British taxpayer.

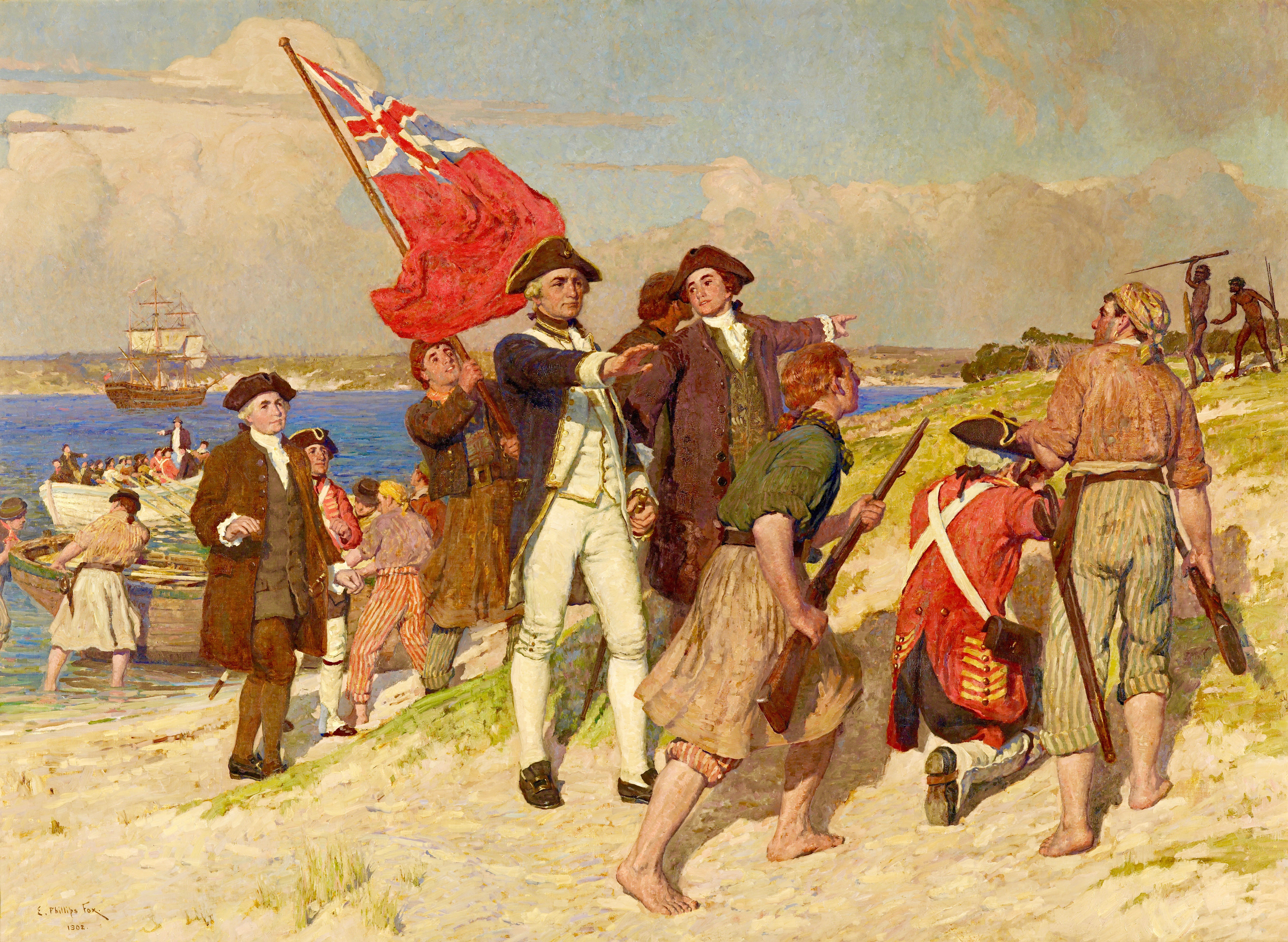
Landing of Lieutenant James Cook at Botany Bay, 29 April 1770

Under Banks's guidance, the American Loyalist James Matra, who had also travelled with Cook, produced a new plan for colonising New South Wales in 1783. Matra argued that the country was suitable for plantations of sugar, cotton and tobacco; New Zealand timber and hemp or flax could prove valuable commodities; it could form a base for Pacific trade; and it could be a suitable compensation for displaced American Loyalists. Following an interview with Secretary of State Lord Sydney in 1784, Matra amended his proposal to include convicts as settlers, considering that this would benefit both "Economy to the Publick, & Humanity to the Individual".

The major alternative to Botany Bay was sending convicts to Africa. From 1775 convicts had been sent to garrison British forts in west Africa, but the experiment had proved unsuccessful. In 1783, the Pitt government considered exiling convicts to a small river island in Gambia where they could form a self-governing community, a "colony of thieves", at no expense to the government.

In 1785, a parliamentary select committee chaired by Lord Beauchamp recommended against the Gambia plan, but failed to endorse the alternative of Botany Bay. In a second report, Beauchamp recommended a penal settlement at Das Voltas Bay in modern Namibia. The plan was dropped, however, when an investigation of the site in 1786 found it to be unsuitable. Two weeks later, in August 1786, the Pitt government announced its intention to send convicts to Botany Bay. The Government incorporated the settlement of Norfolk Island into their plan, with its attractions of timber and flax, proposed by Banks's Royal Society colleagues, Sir John Call and Sir George Young.

There has been a longstanding debate over whether the key consideration in the decision to establish a penal colony at Botany Bay was the pressing need to find a solution to the penal management problem, or whether broader imperial goals – such as trade, securing new supplies of timber and flax for the navy, and the desirability of strategic ports in the region – were paramount. Christopher and Maxwell-Stewart argue that whatever the government's original motives were in establishing the colony, by the 1790s it had at least achieved the imperial objective of providing a harbour where vessels could be careened and resupplied.

=== Colony of New South Wales ===
==== Establishment of the colony (1788 to 1792) ====
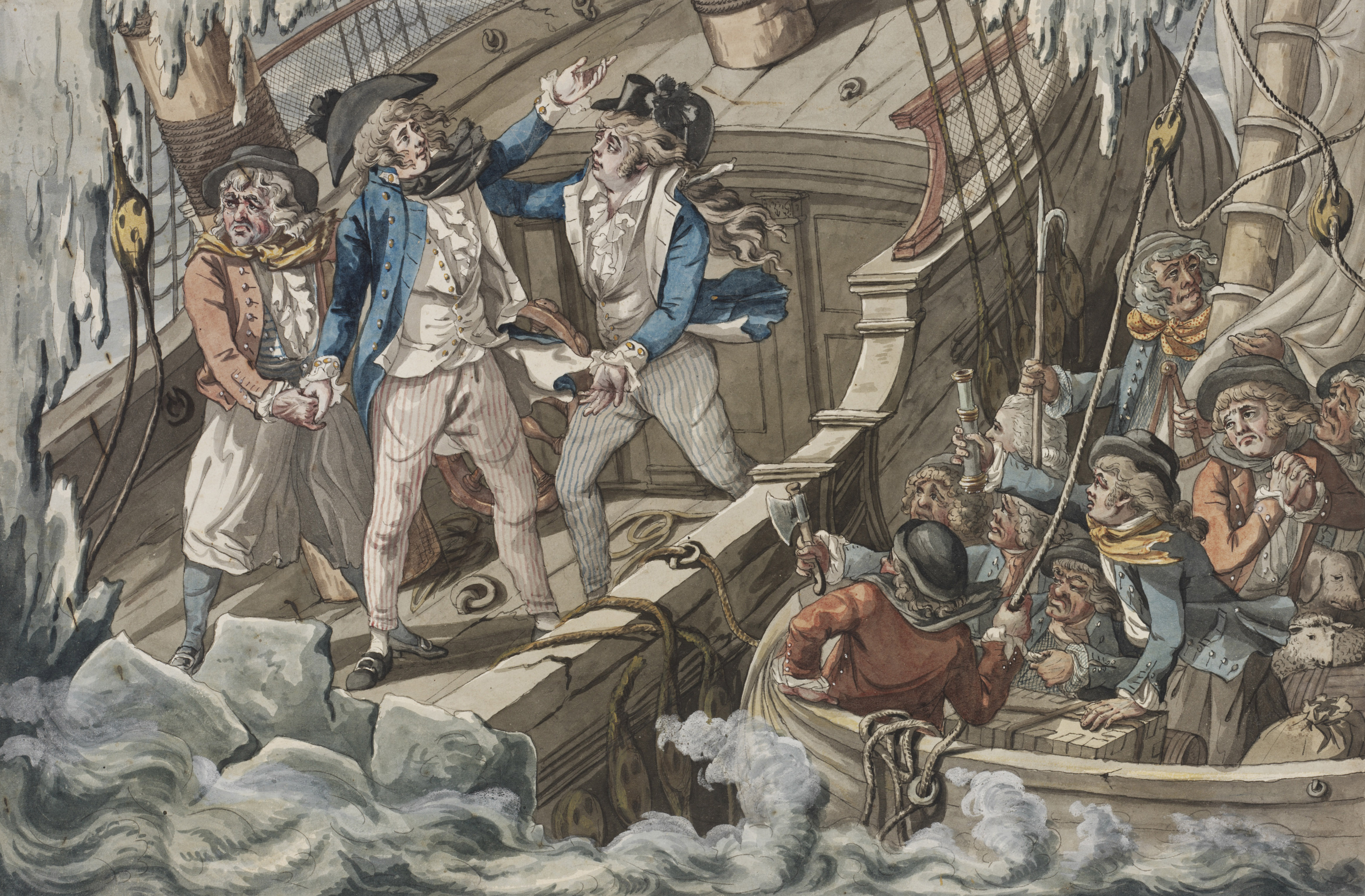
The perilous situation of The Guardian Frigate as she appeared striking on the rocks of ice (c. 1790) – Robert Dighton; depicting the Second Fleet

The colony of New South Wales was established with the arrival of the First Fleet of 11 vessels under the command of Captain Arthur Phillip in January 1788. It consisted of more than a thousand settlers, including 778 convicts (192 women and 586 men). A few days after arrival at Botany Bay the fleet moved to the more suitable Port Jackson where a settlement was established at Sydney Cove on 26 January 1788. This date later became Australia's national day, Australia Day. The colony was formally proclaimed by Governor Phillip on 7 February 1788 at Sydney. Sydney Cove offered a fresh water supply and a safe harbour, which Phillip described as being,

with out exception the finest Harbour in the World [...] Here a Thousand Sail of the Line may ride in the most perfect Security [...].

The territory of New South Wales claimed by Britain included all of Australia eastward of the meridian of 135° East. This included more than half of mainland Australia. The claim also included "all the Islands adjacent in the Pacific" between the latitudes of Cape York and the southern tip of Van Diemen's Land (Tasmania). In 1817, the British government withdrew the extensive territorial claim over the South Pacific, specifying in the Murders Abroad Act 1817 (57 Geo. 3. c. 53) that Tahiti, New Zealand and other islands of the South Pacific were not within His Majesty's dominions. However, it is unclear whether the claim ever extended to the current islands of New Zealand.

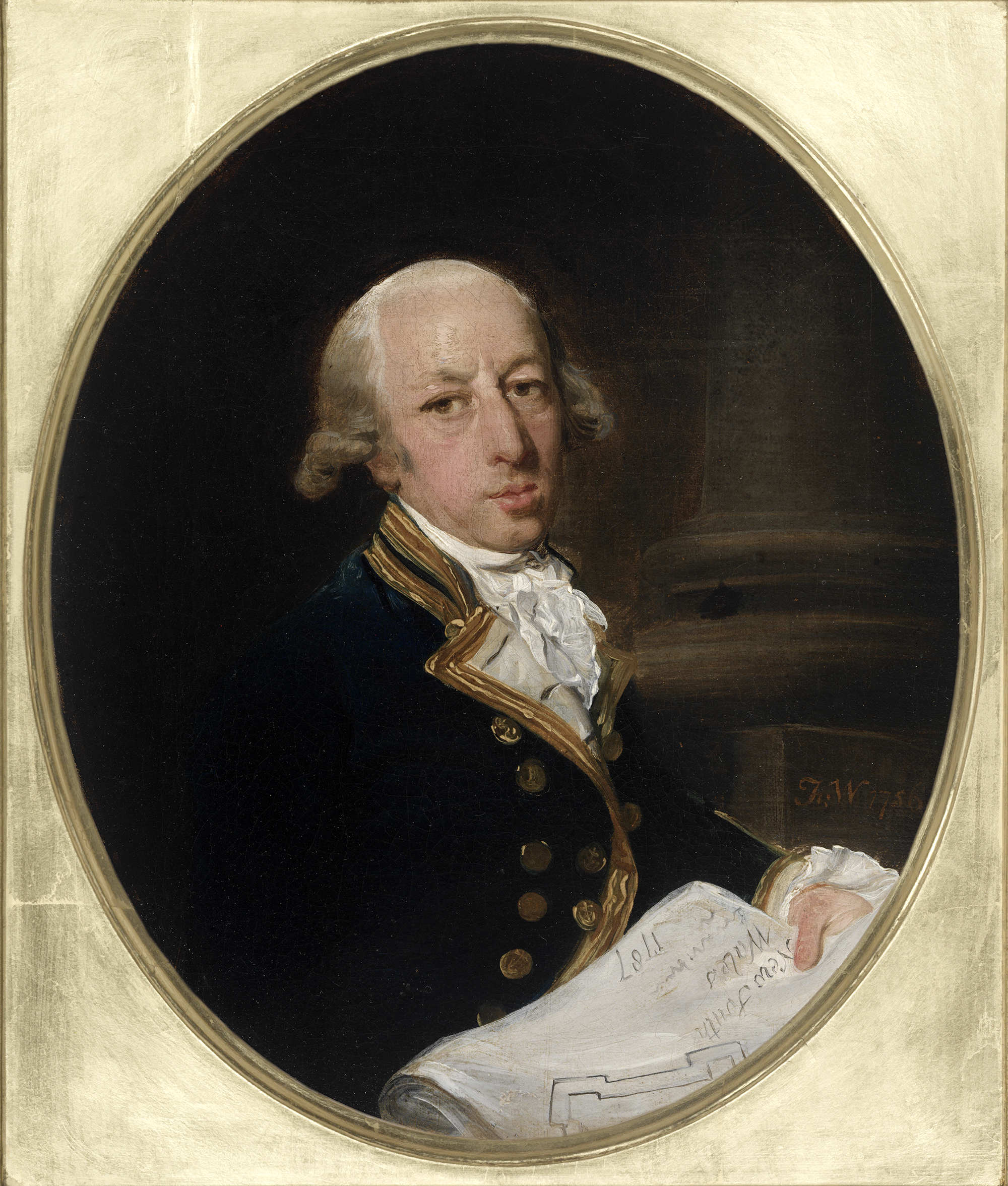
Arthur Phillip, first Governor of New South Wales

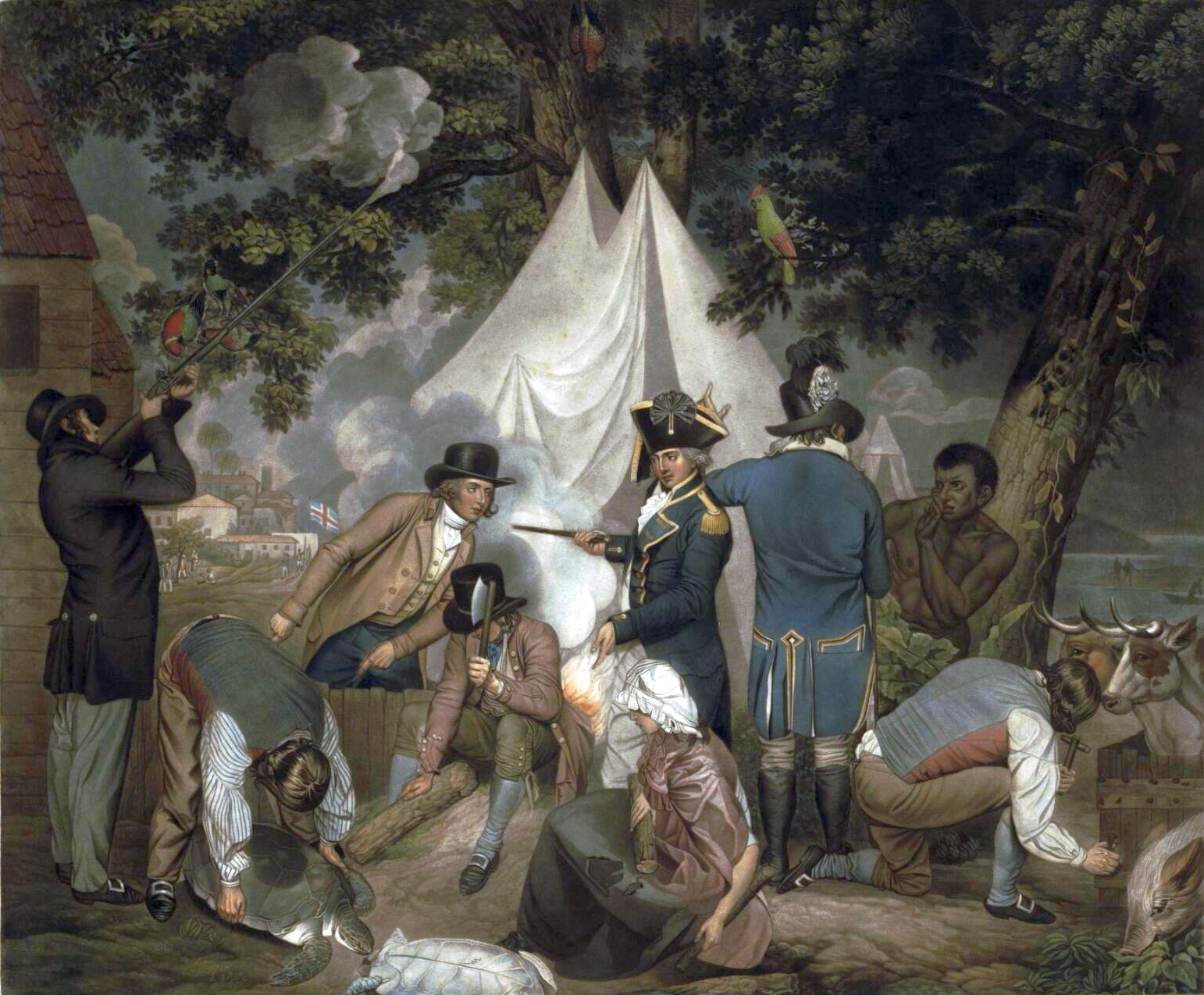
Founding of the settlement of Port Jackson at Botany Bay in New South Wales in 1788 – Thomas Gosse

Governor Phillip was vested with complete authority over the inhabitants of the colony. His intention was to establish harmonious relations with local Aboriginal people and try to reform as well as discipline the convicts of the colony. Early efforts at agriculture were fraught and supplies from overseas were scarce. Between 1788 and 1792 about 3546 male and 766 female convicts were landed at Sydney. Many new arrivals were sick or unfit for work and the condition of healthy convicts also deteriorated due to the hard labour and poor food. The food situation reached crisis point in 1790 and the Second Fleet which finally arrived in June 1790 had lost a quarter of its passengers through sickness, while the condition of the convicts of the Third Fleet appalled Phillip. From 1791, however, the more regular arrival of ships and the beginnings of trade lessened the feeling of isolation and improved supplies.

In 1788, Phillip established a subsidiary settlement on Norfolk Island in the South Pacific where he hoped to obtain timber and flax for the navy. The island, however, had no safe harbour, which led the settlement to be abandoned and the settlers evacuated to Tasmania in 1807. The island was subsequently re-established as a site for secondary transportation in 1825.

Phillip sent exploratory missions in search of better soils, fixed on the Parramatta region as a promising area for expansion, and moved many of the convicts from late 1788 to establish a small township, which became the main centre of the colony's economic life. This left Sydney Cove only as an important port and focus of social life. Poor equipment and unfamiliar soils and climate continued to hamper the expansion of farming from Farm Cove to Parramatta and Toongabbie, but a building program, assisted by convict labour, advanced steadily. Between 1788 and 1792, convicts and their gaolers made up the majority of the population; however, a free population soon began to grow, consisting of emancipated convicts, locally born children, soldiers whose military service had expired and, finally, free settlers from Britain. Governor Phillip departed the colony for England on 11 December 1792, with the new settlement having survived near starvation and immense isolation for four years.

==== Consolidation (1793 to 1821) ====
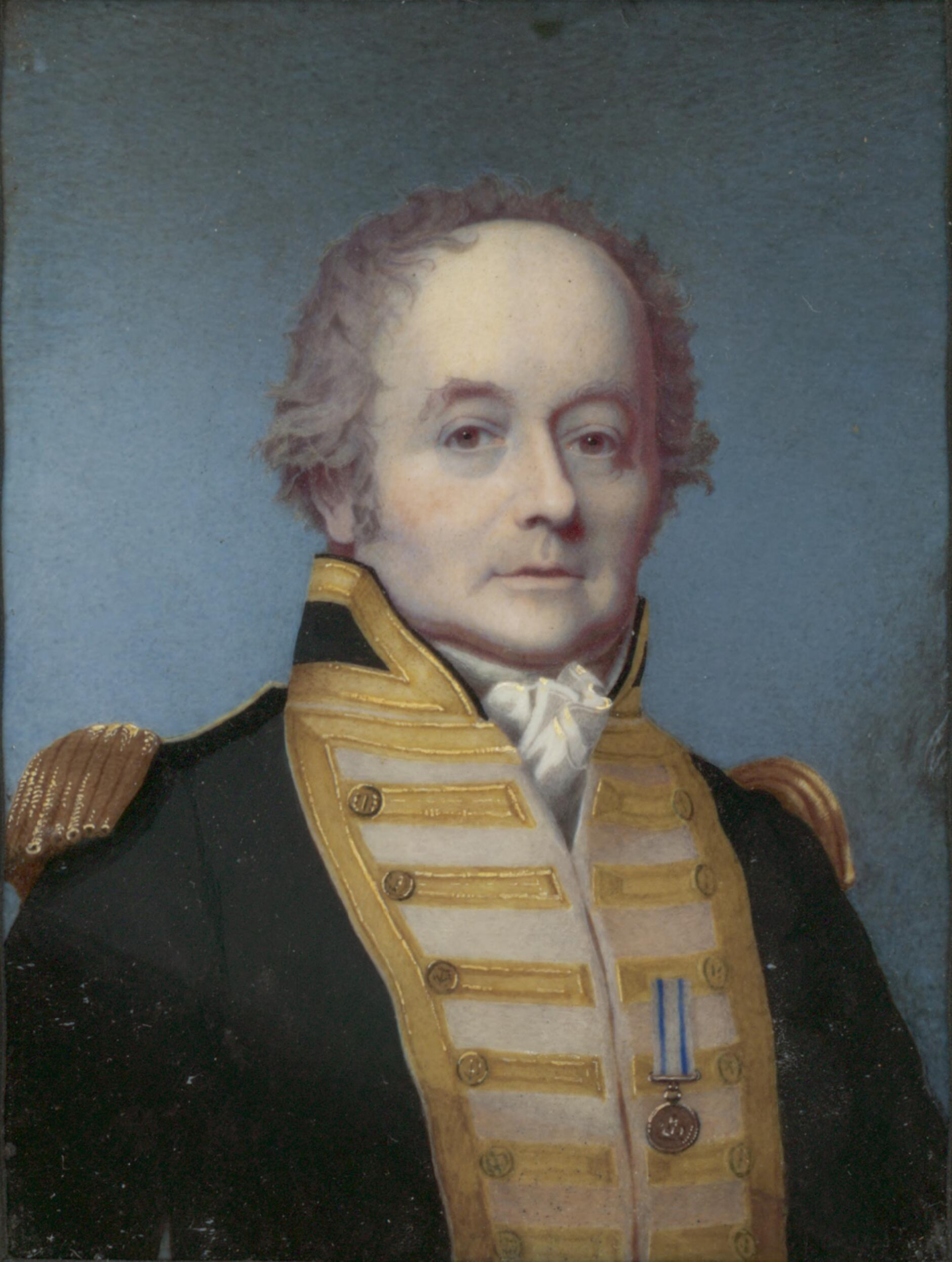
Governor William Bligh

After the departure of Phillip, the colony's military officers began acquiring land and importing consumer goods obtained from visiting ships. Former convicts also farmed land granted to them and engaged in trade. Farms spread to the more fertile lands surrounding Parramatta, Windsor, Richmond and Camden, and by 1803 the colony was self-sufficient in grain. Boat building developed in order to make travel easier and exploit the marine resources of the coastal settlements. Sealing and whaling became important industries.

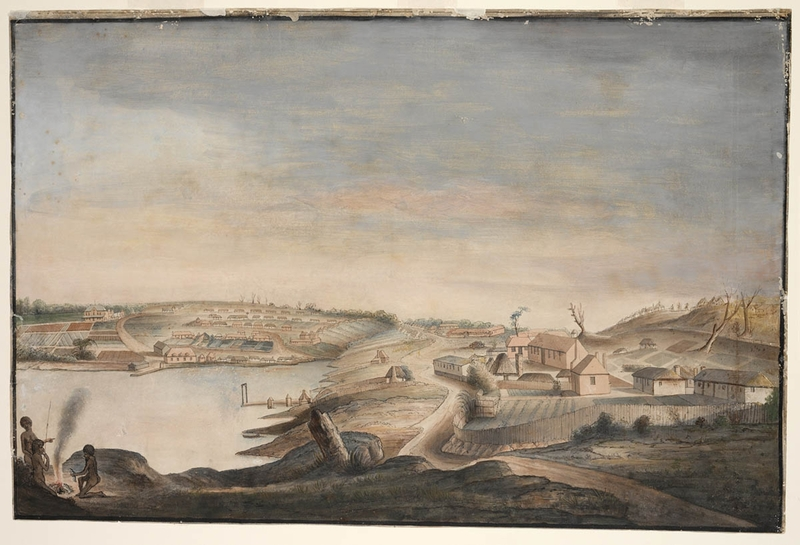
View of Sydney Cove (Aboriginal: Warrane) by Thomas Watling, 1794–1796

The New South Wales Corps was formed in England in 1789 as a permanent regiment of the British Army to relieve the marines who had accompanied the First Fleet. Officers of the Corps soon became involved in the corrupt and lucrative rum trade in the colony. Governor William Bligh (1806–1808) tried to suppress the rum trade and the illegal use of Crown Land, resulting in the Rum Rebellion of 1808. The Corps, working closely with the newly established wool trader John Macarthur, staged the only successful armed takeover of government in Australian history, deposing Bligh and instigating a brief period of military rule prior to the arrival from Britain of Governor Lachlan Macquarie in 1810.

Macquarie served as the last autocratic Governor of New South Wales, from 1810 to 1821, and had a leading role in the social and economic development of New South Wales which saw it transition from a penal colony to a budding civil society. He established a bank, a currency and a hospital. He employed a planner to design the street layout of Sydney and commissioned the construction of roads, wharves, churches, and public buildings. He sent explorers out from Sydney and, in 1815, a road across the Blue Mountains was completed, opening the way for large scale farming and grazing in the lightly wooded pastures west of the Great Dividing Range.

Central to Macquarie's policy was his treatment of the emancipists, whom he considered should be treated as social equals to free-settlers in the colony. He appointed emancipists to key government positions including Francis Greenway as colonial architect and William Redfern as a magistrate. His policy on emancipists was opposed by many influential free settlers, officers and officials, and London became concerned at the cost of his public works. In 1819, London appointed J. T. Bigge to conduct an inquiry into the colony, and Macquarie resigned shortly before the report of the inquiry was published.

==== Expansion (1821 to 1850) ====
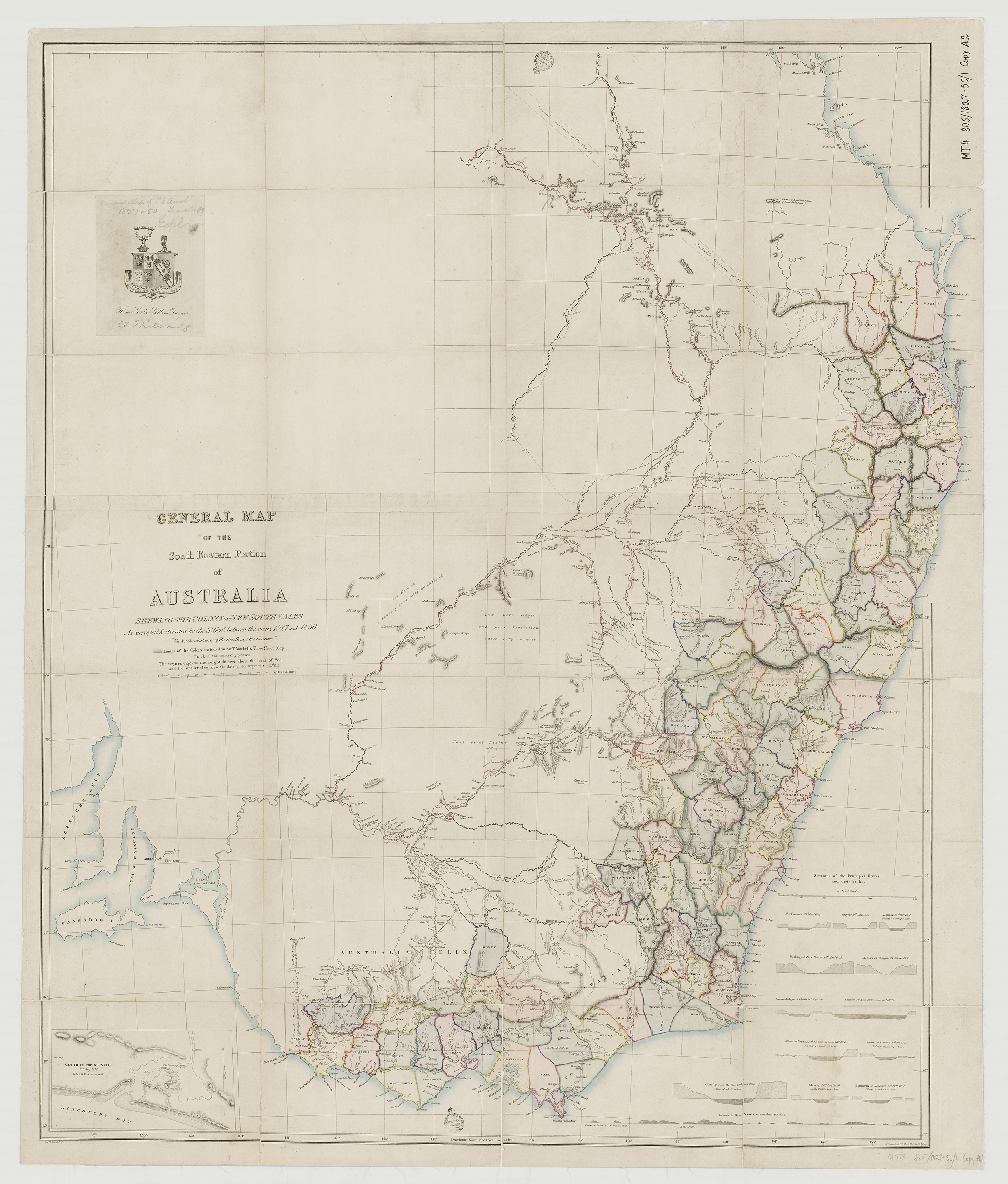
Map of the south eastern portion of Australia, 1850

In 1820, British settlement was largely confined to a 100-kilometre-radius (62 mi) around Sydney and to the central plain of Van Diemen's land. The settler population was 26,000 on the mainland and 6,000 in Van Diemen's Land. Following the end of the Napoleonic Wars in 1815, the transportation of convicts increased rapidly and the number of free settlers grew steadily. From 1821 to 1840, 55,000 convicts arrived in New South Wales and 60,000 in Van Diemen's Land. However, by 1830, free settlers and the locally born exceeded the convict population of New South Wales.

From the 1820s squatters increasingly established unauthorised cattle and sheep runs beyond the official limits of the settled colony. In 1836, a system of annual licences authorising grazing on Crown Land was introduced in an attempt to control the pastoral industry, but booming wool prices and the high cost of land in the settled areas encouraged further squatting. By 1844 wool accounted for half of the colony's exports and by 1850 most of the eastern third of New South Wales was controlled by fewer than 2,000 pastoralists.

In 1825, the western boundary of New South Wales was extended to longitude 129° East, which is the current nominal eastern boundary of Western Australia. As a result, the territory of New South Wales reached its greatest extent, covering the area of the modern state as well as modern Queensland, Victoria, Tasmania, South Australia and the Northern Territory.

By 1850 the settler population of New South Wales had grown to 180,000, not including the 70,000–75,000 living in the area which became the separate colony of Victoria in 1851.

=== Establishment of further colonies ===
After hosting Nicholas Baudin's French naval expedition in Sydney in 1802, Governor Phillip Gidley King decided to establish a settlement in Van Diemen's Land (modern Tasmania) in 1803, partly to forestall a possible French settlement. The British settlement of the island soon centred on Launceston in the north and Hobart in the south. From the 1820s free settlers were encouraged by the offer of land grants in proportion to the capital the settlers would bring. Van Diemen's Land became a separate colony from New South Wales in December 1825 and continued to expand through the 1830s, supported by farming, sheep grazing and whaling. Following the suspension of convict transportation to New South Wales in 1840, Van Diemen's land became the main destination for convicts. Transportation to Van Diemen's Land ended in 1853 and in 1856 the colony officially changed its name to Tasmania.

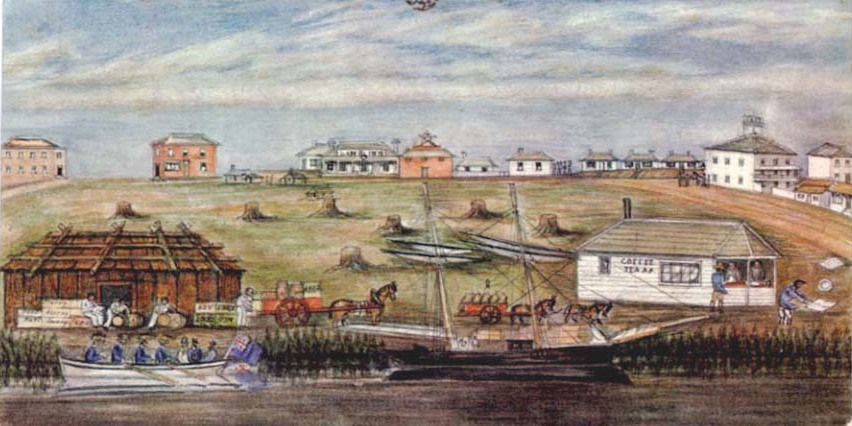
Melbourne Landing, 1840; watercolor by W. Liardet (1840)

Pastoralists from Van Diemen's land began squatting in the Port Phillip hinterland on the mainland in 1834, attracted by its rich grasslands. In 1835, John Batman and others negotiated the transfer of 40,000 hectares (100,000 acres) of land from the Kulin people. However, the treaty was annulled the same year when the British Colonial Office issued the Proclamation of Governor Bourke. The proclamation meant that from then, all people found occupying land without the authority of the government would be considered illegal trespassers.

In 1836, Port Phillip was officially recognised as a district of New South Wales and opened for settlement. The main settlement of Melbourne was established in 1837 as a planned town on the instructions of Governor Bourke. Squatters and settlers from Van Diemen's Land and New South Wales soon arrived in large numbers. In 1851, the Port Phillip District separated from New South Wales as the colony of Victoria.

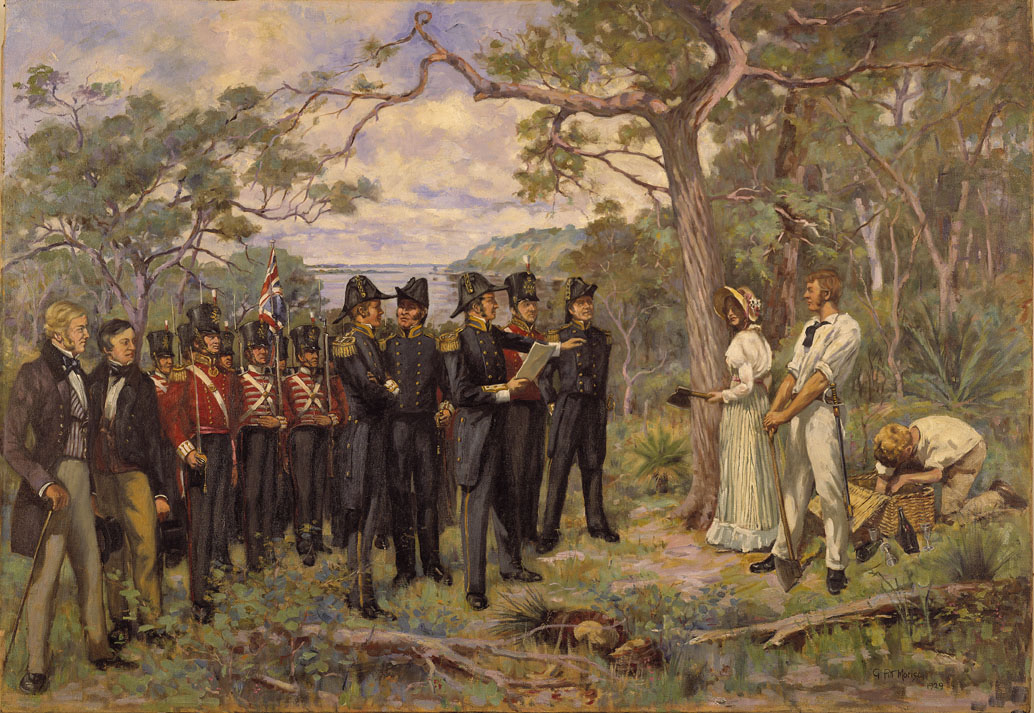
The Foundation of Perth 1829 by George Pitt Morison, depicting a, possibly incorrect, 20th-century reconstruction of the founding ceremony on 12 August 1829

In 1826, the governor of New South Wales, Ralph Darling, sent a military garrison to King George Sound to deter the French from establishing a settlement in New Holland. In 1827, the head of the expedition, Major Edmund Lockyer, formally annexed the western portion of the continent not already claimed by Britain as a British colony. In 1829, the Swan River colony was established at the sites of modern Fremantle and Perth, becoming the first convict-free and privatised colony in Australia. However, by 1850 there were a little more than 5,000 settlers. The colony accepted convicts from that year because of the acute shortage of labour.

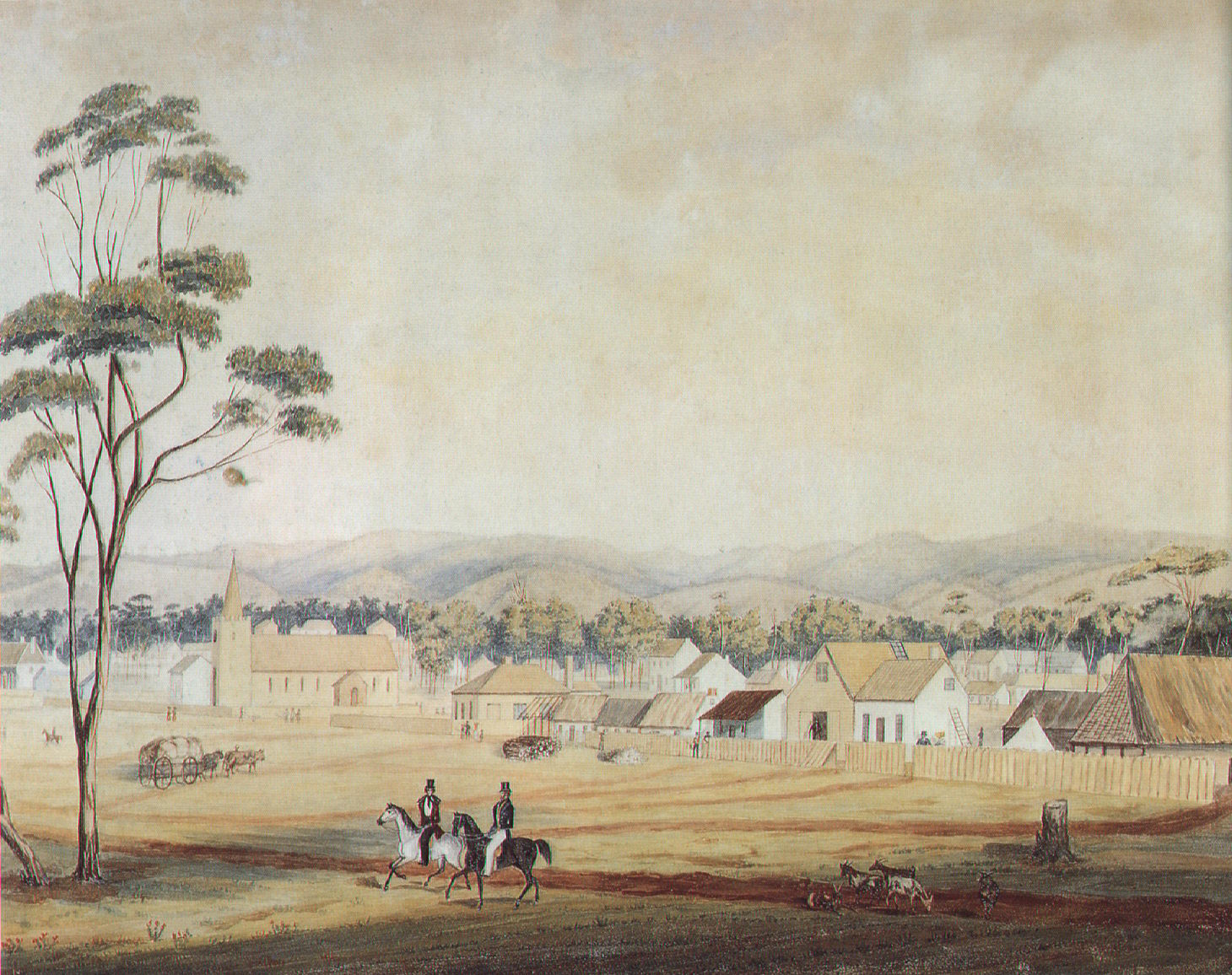
Adelaide in 1839. South Australia was founded as a free-colony, without convicts.

The Province of South Australia was established in 1836 as a privately financed settlement based on the theory of "systematic colonisation" developed by Edward Gibbon Wakefield. Convict labour was banned in the hope of making the colony more attractive to "respectable" families and promote an even balance between male and female settlers. The city of Adelaide was to be planned with a generous provision of churches, parks and schools. Land was to be sold at a uniform price and the proceeds used to secure an adequate supply of labour through selective assisted migration. Various religious, personal and commercial freedoms were guaranteed, and the letters patent enabling the South Australia Act 1834 included a guarantee of Aboriginal land rights.

The colony, however, was badly hit by the depression of 1841–44. Conflict with Indigenous traditional landowners also reduced the protections they had been promised. In 1842, the settlement became a Crown colony administered by the governor and an appointed Legislative Council. The economy recovered and by 1850 the settler population had grown to 60,000. In 1851, the colony achieved limited self-government with a partially elected Legislative Council.

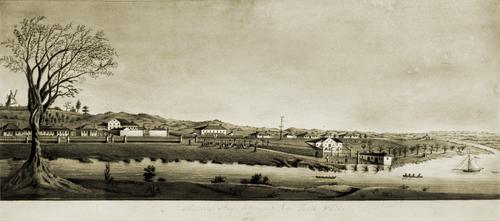
Brisbane (Moreton Bay Settlement), 1835; watercolour by H. Bowerman

In 1824, the Moreton Bay penal settlement was established on the site of present-day Brisbane. In 1842, the penal colony was closed and the area was opened for free settlement. By 1850 the population of Brisbane had reached 8,000 and increasing numbers of pastoralists were grazing cattle and sheep in the Darling Downs west of the town. Frontier violence between settlers and the Indigenous population became severe as pastoralism expanded north of the Tweed River. A series of disputes between northern pastoralists and the government in Sydney led to increasing demands from the northern settlers for separation from New South Wales. In 1857, the British government agreed to the separation and in 1859 the colony of Queensland was proclaimed.

=== Convicts and colonial society ===
==== Convicts and emancipists ====
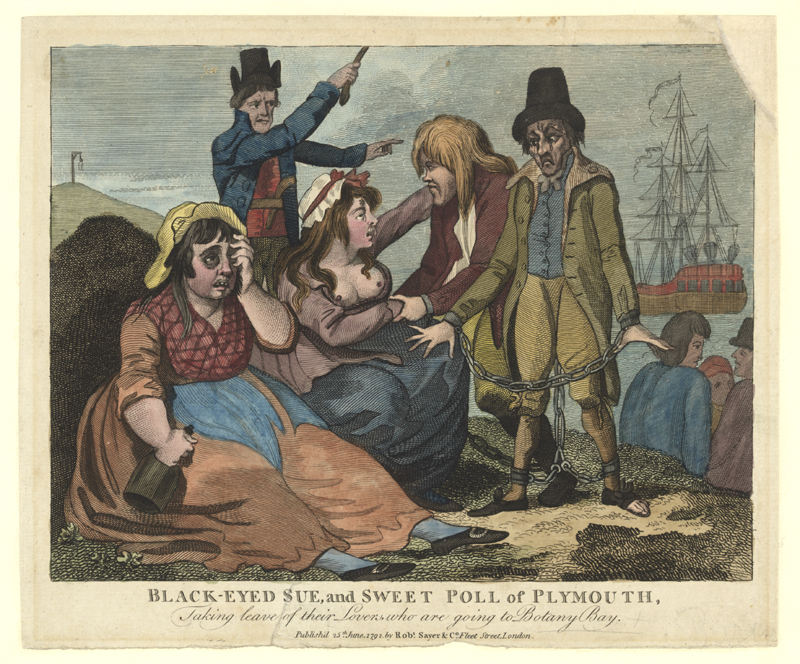
Black-eyed Sue and Sweet Poll of Plymouth, England mourning their lovers who are soon to be transported to Botany Bay (published in London in 1792)

Between 1788 and 1868, approximately 161,700 convicts were transported to the Australian colonies of New South Wales, Van Diemen's Land and Western Australia. The literacy rate of convicts was above average and they brought a range of useful skills to the new colony including building, farming, sailing, fishing and hunting. The small number of free settlers meant that early governors also had to rely on convicts and emancipists for professions such as lawyers, architects, surveyors and teachers. Convicts initially worked on government farms and public works such as land clearing and building. After 1792, the majority were assigned to work for private employers including emancipists. Emancipists were granted small plots of land for farming and a year of government rations. Later they were assigned convict labour to help them work their farms. Some convicts were assigned to military officers to run their businesses. These convicts learnt commercial skills which could help them work for themselves when their sentence ended or they were granted a "ticket of leave" (a form of parole).

Convicts soon established a system of piece work which allowed them to work for wages once their allocated tasks were completed. By 1821 convicts, emancipists and their children owned two-thirds of the land under cultivation, half the cattle and one-third of the sheep. They also worked in trades and small business. Emancipists employed about half of the convicts assigned to private masters.

A series of reforms recommended by J. T. Bigge in 1822 and 1823 worsened conditions for convicts. The food ration was cut and their opportunities to work for wages restricted. More convicts were assigned to rural work gangs, bureaucratic control and surveillance of convicts was made more systematic, isolated penal settlements were established as places of secondary punishment, the rules for tickets of leave were tightened, and land grants were skewed to favour free settlers with large capital. As a result, convicts who arrived after 1820 were far less likely to become property owners, to marry, and to establish families.

==== Free settlers ====
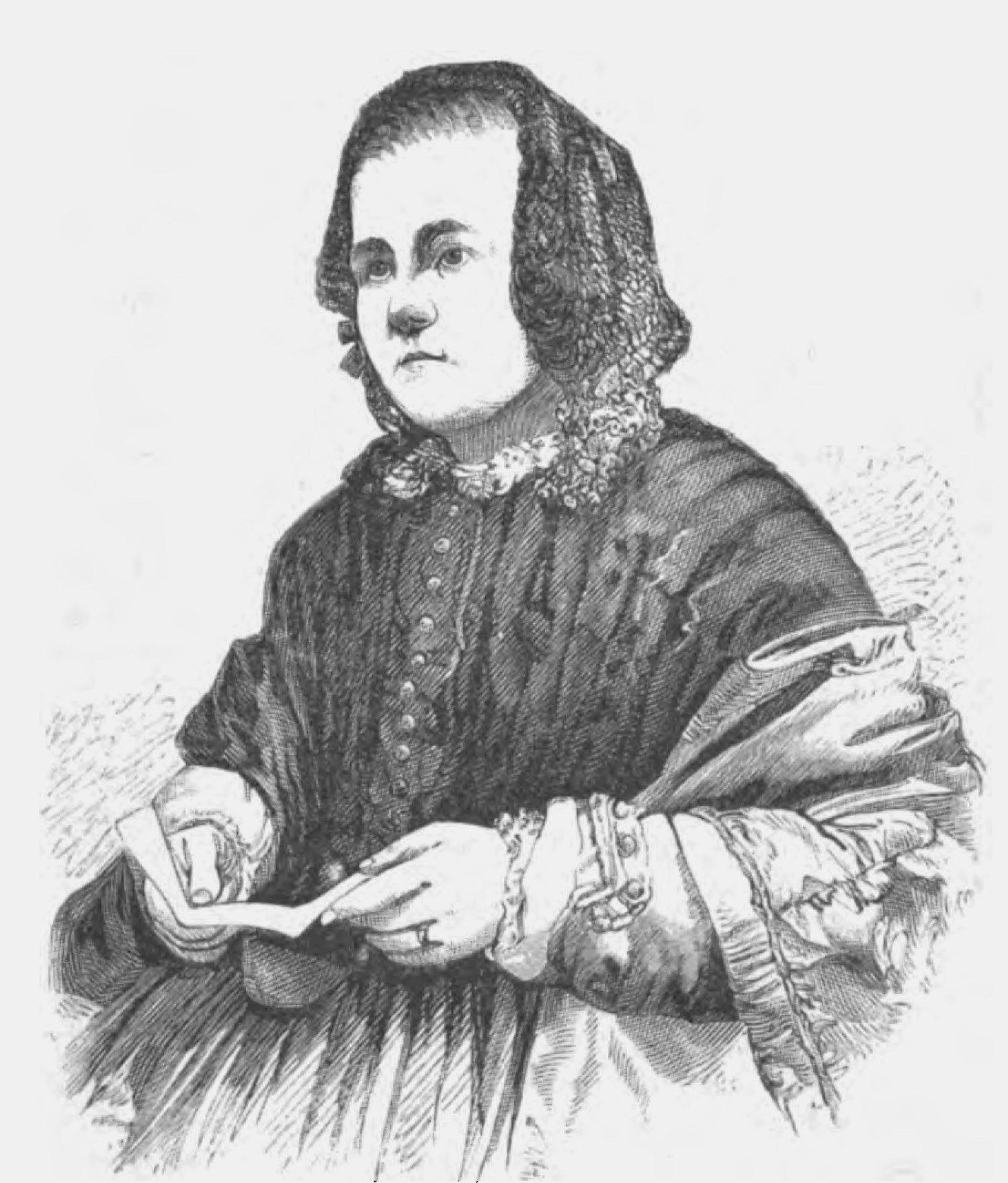
The humanitarian Caroline Chisholm was a leading advocate for women's issues and family friendly colonial policy.

The Bigge reforms also aimed to encourage free settlers by offering them land grants in proportion to their capital. From 1831, the colonies replaced land grants with land sales by auction at a fixed minimum price per acre, the proceeds being used to fund the assisted migration of workers. From 1821 to 1850, Australia attracted 200,000 immigrants from the United Kingdom. However, the system of land allocations led to the concentration of land in the hands of a small number of affluent settlers.

Two-thirds of the migrants to Australia during this period received assistance from the British or colonial governments. Families of convicts were also offered free passage and about 3,500 migrants were selected under the English Poor Laws. Various special-purpose and charitable schemes, such as those of Caroline Chisholm and John Dunmore Lang, also provided migration assistance.

==== Women ====
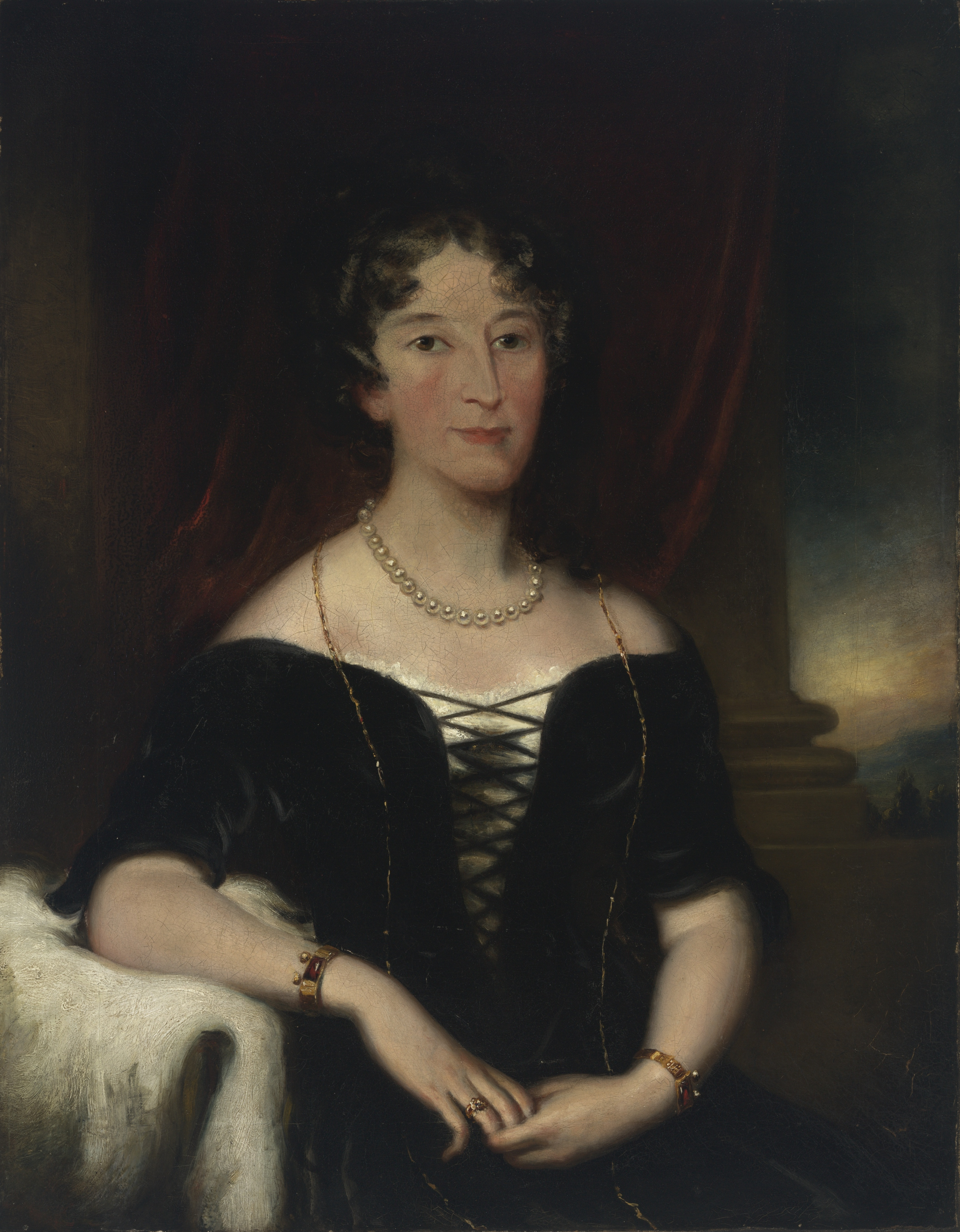
Businesswoman Elizabeth Macarthur helped establish the merino wool industry.

Women comprised only about 15% of convicts transported. Due to the shortage of women in the colony they were more likely to marry than men and tended to choose as husbands older, skilled men with property. The early colonial courts enforced the property rights of women independently of their husbands, and the ration system also gave women and their children some protection from abandonment. Women were active in business and agriculture from the early years of the colony, among the most successful being the former convict turned entrepreneur Mary Reibey and the agriculturalist Elizabeth Macarthur. One-third of the shareholders of the first colonial bank (founded in 1817) were women.

One of the goals of the assisted migration programs from the 1830s was to promote migration of women and families to provide a more even gender balance in the colonies. Caroline Chisholm established a shelter and labour exchange for migrant women in New South Wales in the 1840s and promoted the settlement of single and married women in rural areas.

Between 1830 and 1850 the female proportion of the Australian settler population increased from 24 per cent to 41 per cent.

==== Religion ====
The Church of England was the only recognised church before 1820 and its clergy worked closely with the governors. Richard Johnson (chief chaplain 1788–1802) was charged by Governor Arthur Phillip, with improving "public morality" in the colony and was also heavily involved in health and education. Samuel Marsden (various ministries 1795–1838) became known for his missionary work, the severity of his punishments as a magistrate, and the vehemence of his public denunciations of Catholicism and Irish convicts.

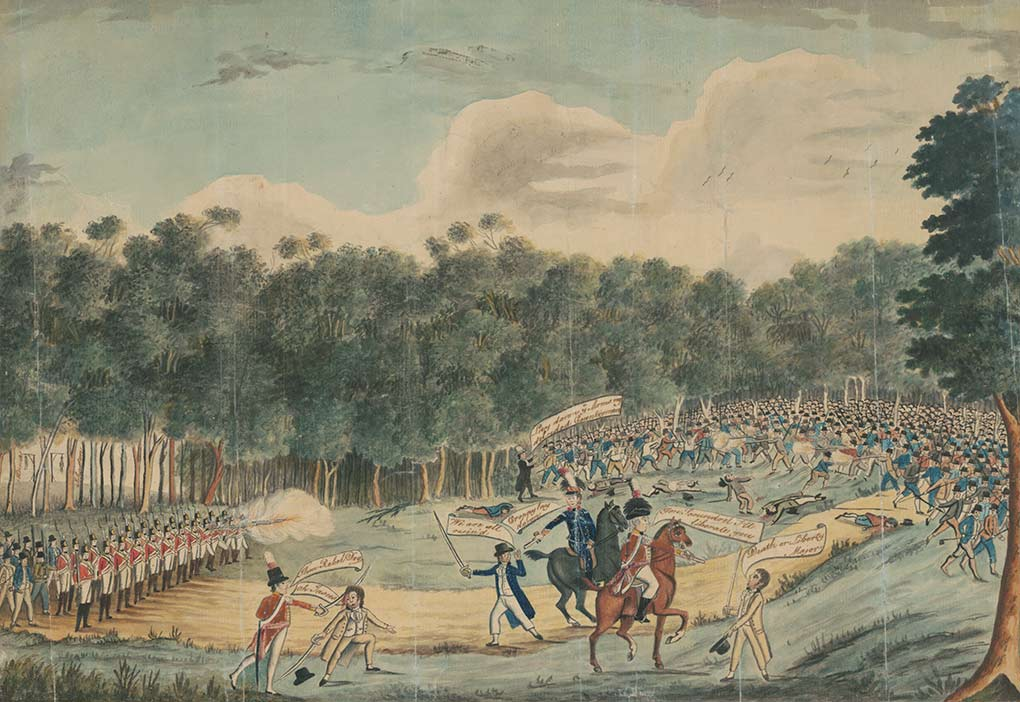
A painting depicting the Castle Hill Rebellion in Sydney of 1804

About a quarter of convicts were Catholics. The lack of official recognition of Catholicism was combined with suspicion of Irish convicts which only increased after the Irish-led Castle Hill Rebellion of 1804. Only two Catholic priests operated temporarily in the colony before Governor Macquarie appointed official Catholic chaplains in New South Wales and Van Diemen's Land in 1820.

The Bigge reports recommended that the status of the Anglican Church be enhanced. An Anglican archdeacon was appointed in 1824 and allocated a seat in the first advisory Legislative Council. The Anglican clergy and schools also received state support. This policy was changed under Governor Burke by the Church Acts of 1836 and 1837. The government now provided state support for the clergy and church buildings of the four largest denominations: Anglican, Catholic, Presbyterian and, later, Methodist.

Many Anglicans saw state support of the Catholic Church as a threat. The prominent Presbyterian minister John Dunmore Lang also promoted sectarian divisions in the 1840s. State support, however, led to a growth in church activities. Charitable associations such as the Catholic Sisters of Charity, founded in 1838, provided hospitals, orphanages and asylums for the old and disabled. Religious organisations were also the main providers of school education in the first half of the nineteenth century, a notable example being Lang's Australian College which opened in 1831. Many religious associations, such as the Sisters of St Joseph, co-founded by Mary MacKillop in 1866, continued their educational activities after the provision of secular state schools grew from the 1850s.

=== Exploration of the continent ===
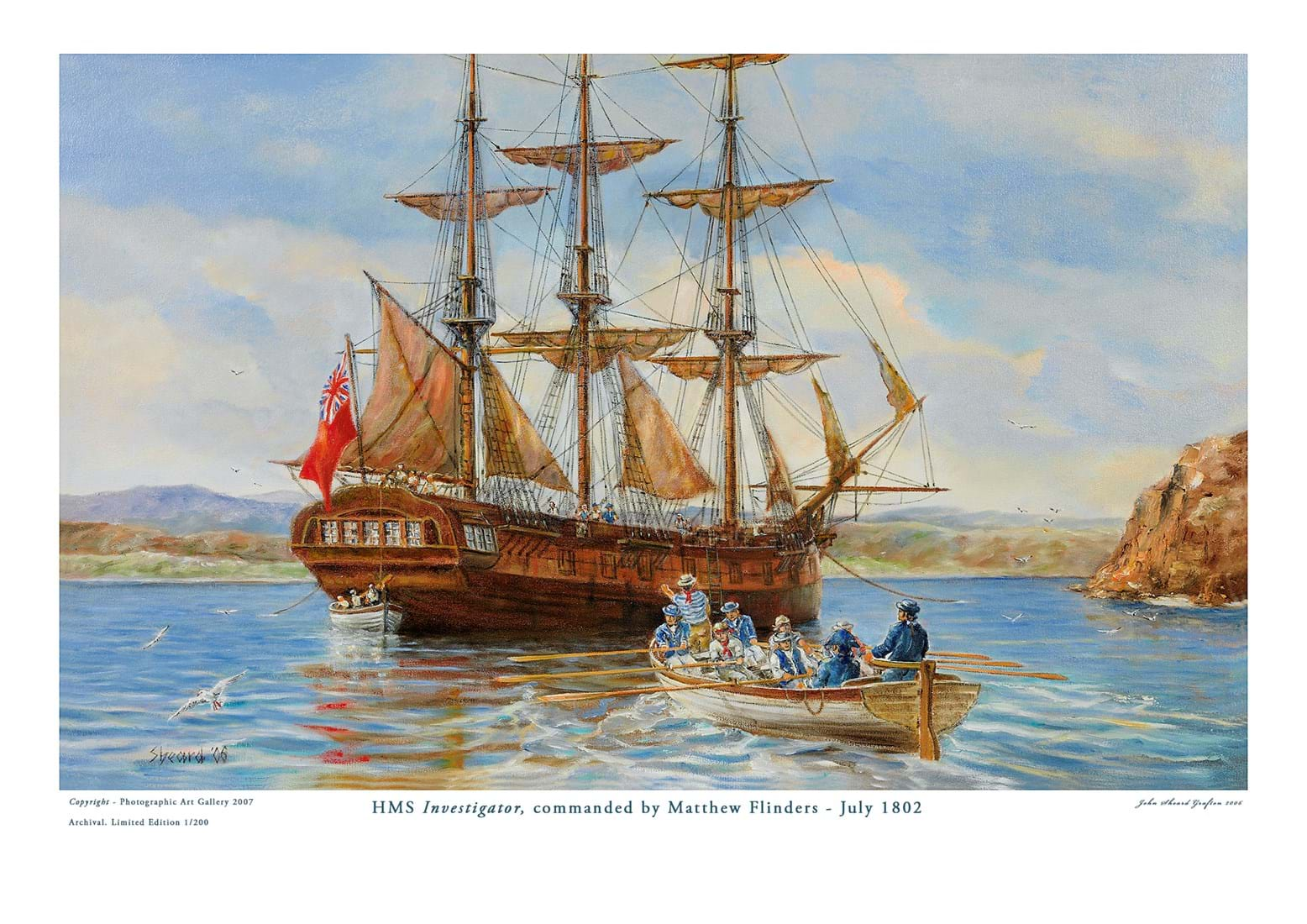
Flinders prepares to circumnavigate Terra Australis, July 1802

In 1798–99 George Bass and Matthew Flinders set out from Sydney in a sloop and circumnavigated Tasmania, thus proving it to be an island. In 1801–02 Matthew Flinders in HMS Investigator led the first circumnavigation of Australia. Aboard ship was the Aboriginal explorer Bungaree, who became the first person born on the Australian continent to circumnavigate it.

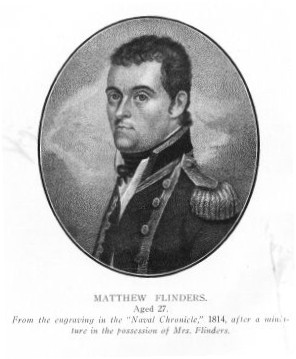
Matthew Flinders led the first successful circumnavigation of Australia in 1801–02.

In 1798, the former convict John Wilson and two companions crossed the Blue Mountains, west of Sydney, in an expedition ordered by Governor Hunter. Hunter suppressed news of the feat for fear that it would encourage convicts to abscond from the settlement. In 1813, Gregory Blaxland, William Lawson and William Wentworth crossed the mountains by a different route and a road was soon built to the Central Tablelands.

In 1824, Hamilton Hume and William Hovell led an expedition to find new grazing land in the south of the colony, and also to find out where New South Wales' western rivers flowed. Over 16 weeks in 1824–25, they journeyed to Port Phillip and back. They discovered the Murray River (which they named the Hume) and many of its tributaries, and good agricultural and grazing lands.

Charles Sturt led an expedition along the Macquarie River in 1828 and discovered the Darling River. Leading a second expedition in 1829, Sturt followed the Murrumbidgee River into the Murray River. His party then followed this river to its junction with the Darling River. Sturt continued down river on to Lake Alexandrina, where the Murray meets the sea in South Australia.

Surveyor General Sir Thomas Mitchell conducted a series of expeditions from the 1830s to follow up these previous expeditions. Mitchell employed three Aboriginal guides and recorded many Aboriginal place names. He also recorded a violent encounter with traditional owners on the Murray in 1836 in which his men pursued them, "shooting as many as they could."

The Polish scientist and explorer Count Paul Edmund Strzelecki conducted surveying work in the Australian Alps in 1839 and, led by two Aboriginal guides, became the first European to ascend Australia's highest peak, which he named Mount Kosciuszko in honour of the Polish patriot Tadeusz Kościuszko.

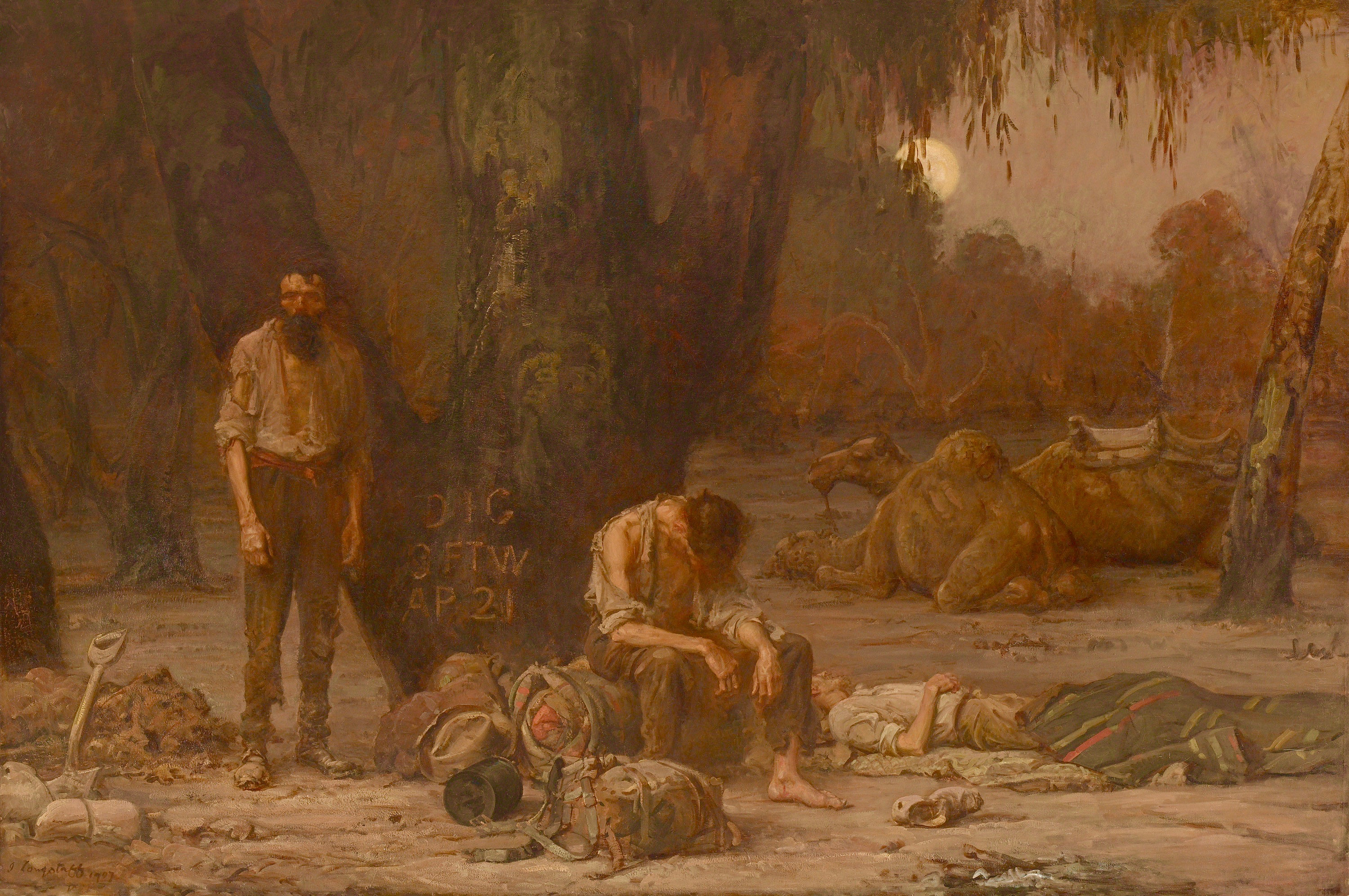
John Longstaff, Arrival of Burke, Wills and King at the deserted camp at Cooper's Creek, Sunday evening, 21 April 1861

The German scientist Ludwig Leichhardt led three expeditions in northern Australia in the 1840s, sometimes with the help of Aboriginal guides. He and his party disappeared in 1848 while attempting to cross the continent from east to west. Edmund Kennedy led an expedition into what is now far-western Queensland in 1847 before being speared by Aboriginals in the Cape York Peninsula in 1848.

In 1860, Burke and Wills led the first south–north crossing of the continent from Melbourne to the Gulf of Carpentaria. Lacking bushcraft and unwilling to learn from the local Aboriginal people, Burke and Wills died in 1861, having returned from the Gulf to their rendezvous point at Coopers Creek only to discover the rest of their party had departed the location only a matter of hours previously. They became tragic heroes to the European settlers, their funeral attracting a crowd of more than 50,000 and their story inspiring numerous books, artworks, films and representations in popular culture.

In 1862, John McDouall Stuart succeeded in traversing central Australia from south to north. His expedition mapped out the route which was later followed by the Australian Overland Telegraph Line.

The completion of this telegraph line in 1872 was associated with further exploration of the Gibson Desert and the Nullarbor Plain. While exploring central Australia in 1872, Ernest Giles sighted Kata Tjuta from a location near Kings Canyon and called it Mount Olga. The following year Willian Gosse observed Uluru and named it Ayers Rock, in honour of the Chief Secretary of South Australia, Sir Henry Ayers.

In 1879, Alexander Forrest trekked from the north coast of Western Australia to the overland telegraph, discovering land suitable for grazing in the Kimberley region.

=== Impact of British settlement on Indigenous population ===
When the First Fleet arrived in Sydney Cove with some 1,300 colonists in January 1788 the Aboriginal population of the Sydney region is estimated to have been about 3,000 people. The first governor of New South Wales, Arthur Phillip, arrived with instructions to:

endeavour by every possible means to open an intercourse with the natives, and to conciliate their affections, enjoining all our subjects to live in amity and kindness with them.

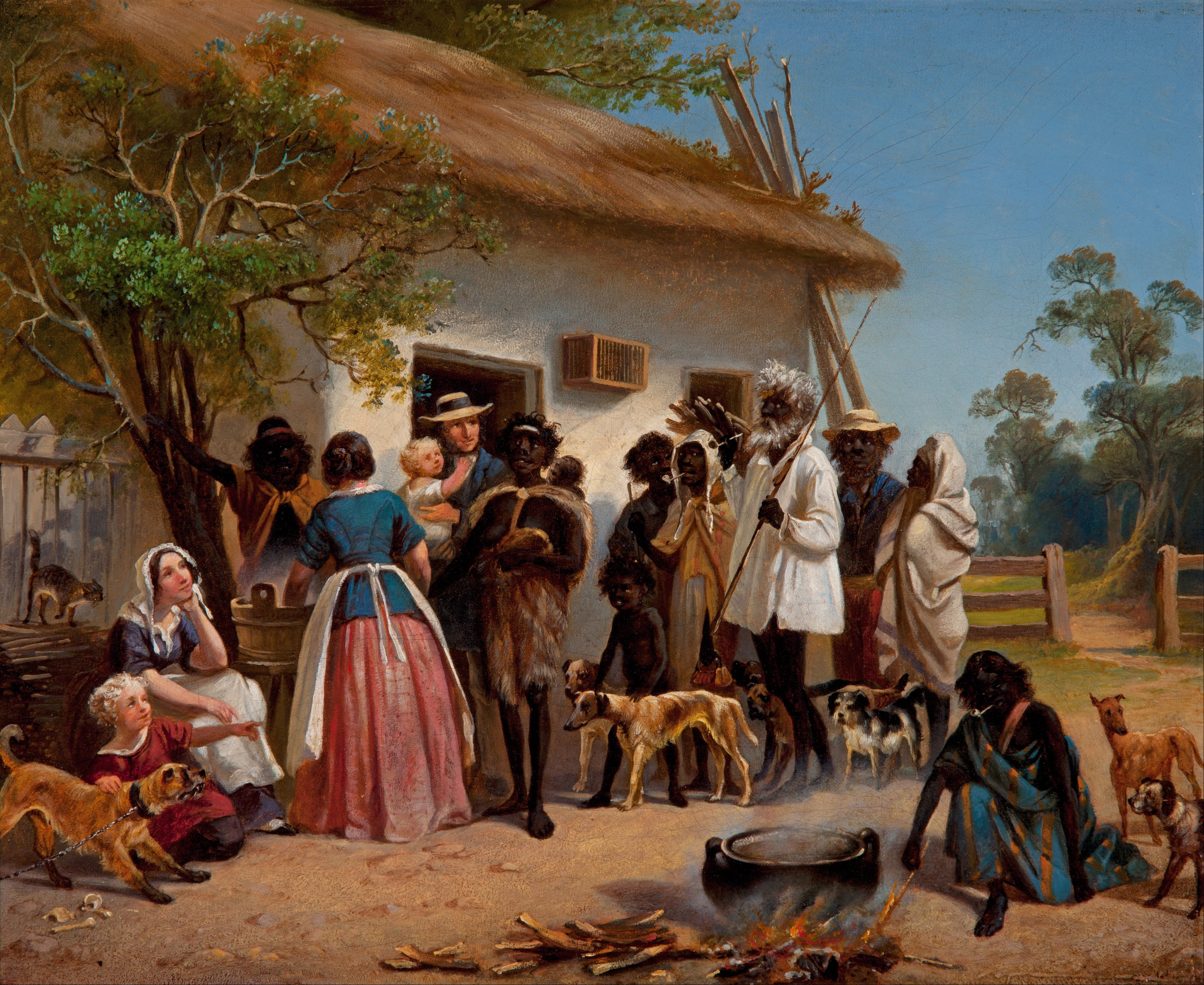
Alexander Schramm's A Scene in South Australia (1850) depicts German settlers with Aboriginals

==== Disease ====
The relative isolation of the Indigenous population for some 60,000 years meant that they had little resistance to many introduced diseases. An outbreak of smallpox in April 1789 killed about half the Aboriginal population of the Sydney region. The source of the outbreak is controversial; some researchers contend that it originated from contact with Indonesian fisherman in the far north while others argue that it is more likely to have been inadvertently, or deliberately, spread by settlers.

There were further smallpox outbreaks devastating Aboriginal populations from the late 1820s (affecting south-eastern Australia), in the early 1860s (travelling inland from the Coburg Peninsula in the north to the Great Australian Bight in the south), and in the late 1860s (from the Kimberley to Geraldton). According to Josephine Flood, the estimated Aboriginal mortality rate from smallpox was 60 per cent on first exposure, 50 per cent in the tropics, and 25 per cent in the arid interior.

Other introduced diseases such as measles, influenza, typhoid and tuberculosis also resulted in high death rates in Aboriginal communities. Butlin estimates that the Aboriginal population in the area of modern Victoria was around 50,000 in 1788 before two smallpox outbreaks reduced it to about 12,500 in 1830. Between 1835 and 1853, the Aboriginal population of Victoria fell from 10,000 to around 2,000. It is estimated that about 60 per cent of these deaths were from introduced diseases, 18 per cent from natural causes and 15 per cent from settler violence.

Venereal diseases were also a factor in Indigenous depopulation, reducing Aboriginal fertility rates in south-eastern Australia by an estimated 40 per cent by 1855. By 1890 up to 50 per cent of the Aboriginal population in some regions of Queensland were affected.

==== Conflict and dispossession ====
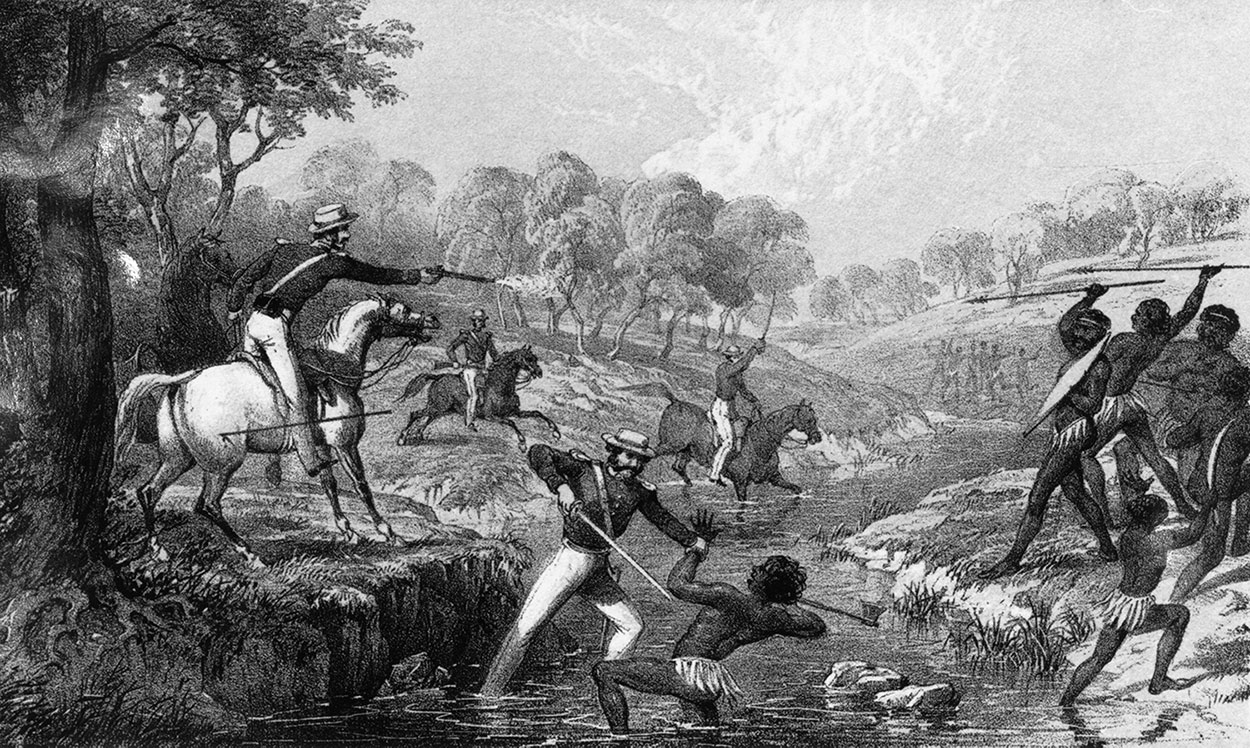
Mounted police engaging Indigenous people during the Slaughterhouse Creek Massacre of 1838, during the Australian frontier wars

The British settlement was initially planned to be a self-sufficient penal colony based on agriculture. Karskens argues that conflict broke out between the settlers and the traditional owners of the land because of the settlers' assumptions about the superiority of British civilisation and their entitlement to land which they had "improved" through building and cultivation.

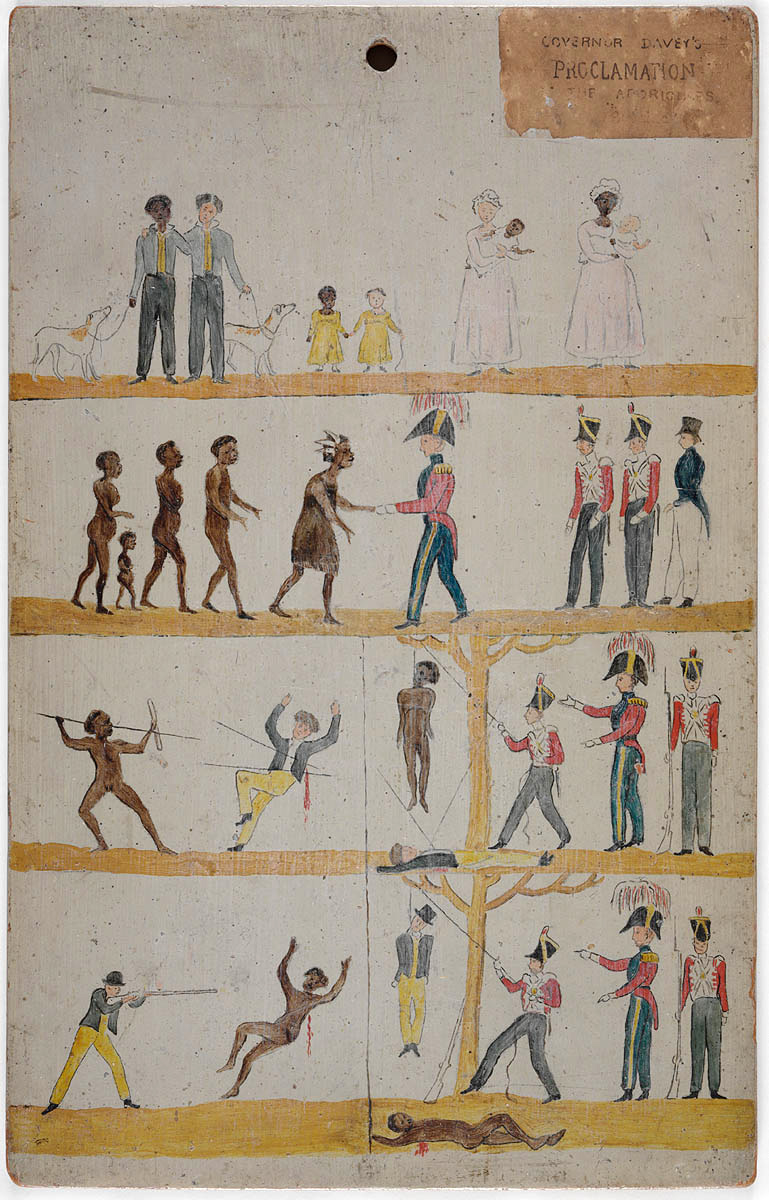
Proclamation issued in Van Diemen's Land around 1828–1830 by Lieutenant-Governor Arthur, which explains the precepts of British justice in pictorial form for the Tasmanian Aboriginals. Tasmania suffered a higher level of conflict than the other British colonies in Australia.

Conflict also arose from cross-cultural misunderstandings and from reprisals for previous actions such as the kidnapping of Aboriginal men, women and children. Reprisal attacks and collective punishments were perpetrated by colonists and Aboriginal groups alike. Sustained Aboriginal attacks on settlers, the burning of crops and the mass killing of livestock were more obviously acts of resistance to the loss of traditional land and food resources.

There were serious conflicts between settlers in the Sydney region and Aboriginals (Darug people) from 1794 to 1800 in which 26 settlers and up to 200 Darug were killed. Conflict also erupted south-west of Sydney (in Dharawal country) from 1814 to 1816, culminating in the Appin massacre (April 1816) in which at least 14 Aboriginal people were killed.

In the 1820s, the colony spread over the Great Dividing Range, opening the way for large scale farming and grazing in Wiradjuri country. From 1822 to 1824 Windradyne led a group of 50–100 Aboriginal men in raids which resulted in the death of 15–20 colonists. Estimates of Aboriginal deaths in the conflict range from 15 to 100.

In Van Diemen's land, the Black War broke out in 1824, following a rapid expansion of settler numbers and sheep grazing in the island's interior. Martial law was declared in November 1828 and in October 1830 a "Black Line" of around 2,200 troops and settlers swept the island with the intention of driving the Aboriginal population from the settled districts. From 1830 to 1834, George Augustus Robinson and Aboriginal ambassadors including Truganini led a series of "Friendly Missions" to the Aboriginal tribes which effectively ended the war. Around 200 settlers and 600 to 900 Aboriginal Tasmanians were killed in the conflict and the Aboriginal survivors were eventually relocated to Flinders Island.

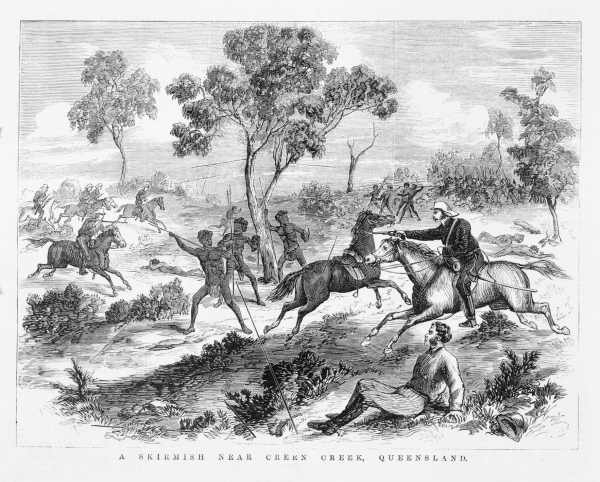
Fighting near Creen Creek, Queensland in September 1876

The spread of settlers and pastoralists into the region of modern Victoria in the 1830s also sparked conflict with traditional landowners. Broome estimates that 80 settlers and 1,000–1,500 Aboriginal people died in frontier conflict in Victoria from 1835 to 1853.

The growth of the Swan River Colony in the 1830s led to conflict with Aboriginal people, culminating in the Pinjarra massacre in which some 15 to 30 Aboriginal people were killed. According to Neville Green, 30 settlers and 121 Aboriginal people died in violent conflict in Western Australia between 1826 and 1852.

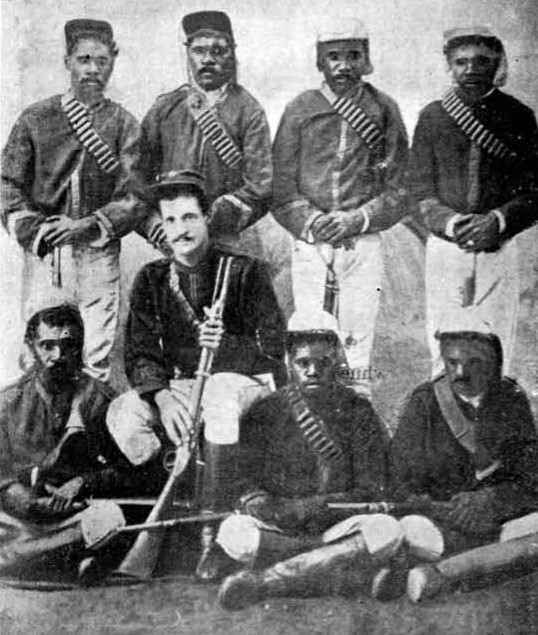
The Australian native police consisted of native troopers under the command of white officers that was largely responsible for the 'dispersal' of Aboriginal tribes in eastern Australia, but particularly in New South Wales and Queensland

The spread of sheep and cattle grazing after 1850 brought further conflict with Aboriginal tribes more distant from the closely settled areas. Aboriginal casualty rates in conflicts increased as the colonists made greater use of mounted police, Native Police units, and newly developed revolvers and breech-loaded guns. Conflict was particularly intense in NSW in the 1840s and in Queensland from 1860 to 1880. In central Australia, it is estimated that 650 to 850 Aboriginal people, out of a population of 4,500, were killed by colonists from 1860 to 1895. In the Gulf Country of northern Australia five settlers and 300 Aboriginal people were killed before 1886. The last recorded massacre of Aboriginal people by settlers was at Coniston in the Northern Territory in 1928 where at least 31 Aboriginal people were killed.

The spread of British settlement also led to an increase in inter-tribal Aboriginal conflict as more people were forced off their traditional lands into the territory of other, often hostile, tribes. Butlin estimated that of the 8,000 Aboriginal deaths in Victoria from 1835 to 1855, 200 were from inter-tribal violence.

Broome estimates the total death toll from settler-Aboriginal conflict between 1788 and 1928 as 1,700 settlers and 17–20,000 Aboriginal people. Reynolds has suggested a higher "guesstimate" of 3,000 settlers and up to 30,000 Aboriginals killed. A project team at the University of Newcastle, Australia, has reached a preliminary estimate of 8,270 Aboriginal deaths in frontier massacres from 1788 to 1930.

==== Accommodation and protection ====
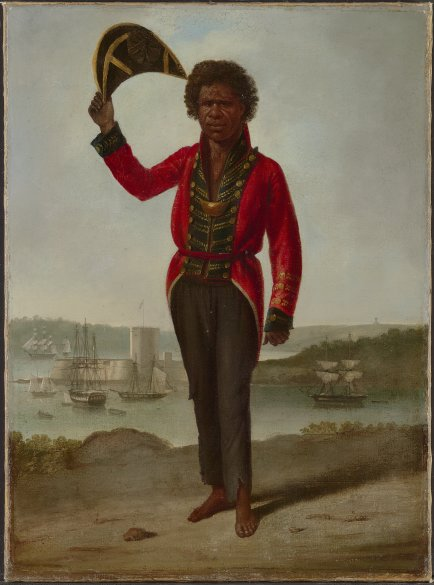
Portrait of Bungaree at Sydney in 1826, by Augustus Earle.

In the first two years of settlement the Aboriginal people of Sydney mostly avoided the newcomers. In November 1790, Bennelong led the survivors of several clans into Sydney, 18 months after the smallpox epidemic that had devastated the Aboriginal population. Bungaree, a Kuringgai man, joined Matthew Flinders in his circumnavigation of Australia from 1801 to 1803, playing an important role as emissary to the various Indigenous peoples they encountered.

Governor Macquarie attempted to assimilate Aboriginal people, providing land grants, establishing Aboriginal farms, and founding a Native Institution to provide education to Aboriginal children. However, by the 1820s the Native Institution and Aboriginal farms had failed. Aboriginal people continued to live on vacant waterfront land and on the fringes of the Sydney settlement, adapting traditional practices to the new semi-urban environment.

Following escalating frontier conflict, Protectors of Aborigines were appointed in South Australia and the Port Phillip District in 1839, and in Western Australia in 1840. The aim was to extend the protection of British law to Aboriginal people, to distribute rations, and to provide education, instruction in Christianity, and occupational training. However, by 1857 the protection offices had been closed due to their cost and failure to meets their goals.

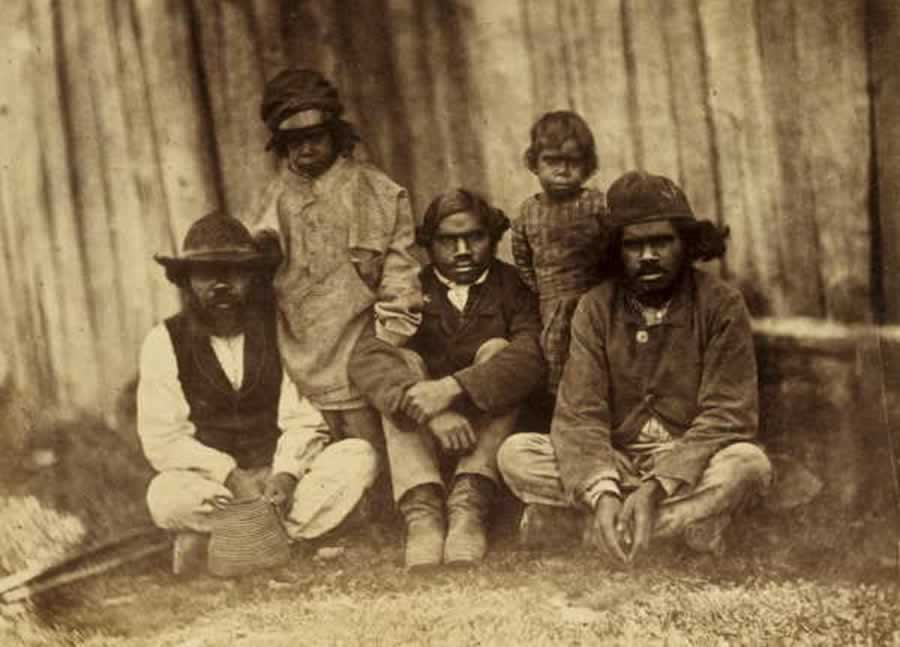
Aboriginal farmers at Loddon Aboriginal Protectorate Station at Franklinford, Victoria, in 1858

In 1825, the New South Wales governor granted 4,000 hectares (10,000 acres) for an Aboriginal Christian mission at Lake Macquarie. In the 1830s and early 1840s there were also missions in the Wellington Valley, Port Phillip and Moreton Bay. The settlement for Aboriginal Tasmanians on Flinders Island operated effectively as a mission under George Robinson from 1835 to 1838.

In New South Wales, 116 Aboriginal reserves were established between 1860 and 1894. Most reserves allowed Aboriginal people a degree of autonomy and freedom to enter and leave. In contrast, the Victorian Board for the Protection of Aborigines (created in 1869) had extensive power to regulate the employment, education and place of residence of Aboriginal Victorians, and closely managed the five reserves and missions established since self government in 1858. In 1886, the protection board gained the power to exclude "half caste" Aboriginal people from missions and stations. The Victorian legislation was the forerunner of the racial segregation policies of other Australian governments from the 1890s.

In more densely settled areas, most Aboriginal people who had lost control of their land lived on reserves and missions, or on the fringes of cities and towns. In pastoral districts the British Waste Land Act 1848 gave traditional landowners limited rights to live, hunt and gather food on Crown land under pastoral leases. Many Aboriginal groups camped on pastoral stations where Aboriginal men were often employed as shepherds and stockmen. These groups were able to retain a connection with their lands and maintain aspects of their traditional culture.

Foreign pearlers moved into the Torres Strait Islands from 1868 bringing exotic diseases which halved the Indigenous population. In 1871, the London Missionary Society began operating in the islands and most Torres Strait Islanders converted to Christianity which they considered compatible with their beliefs. Queensland annexed the islands in 1879.

== From autonomy to federation ==
=== Colonial self-government and the gold rushes ===
==== Towards representative government ====
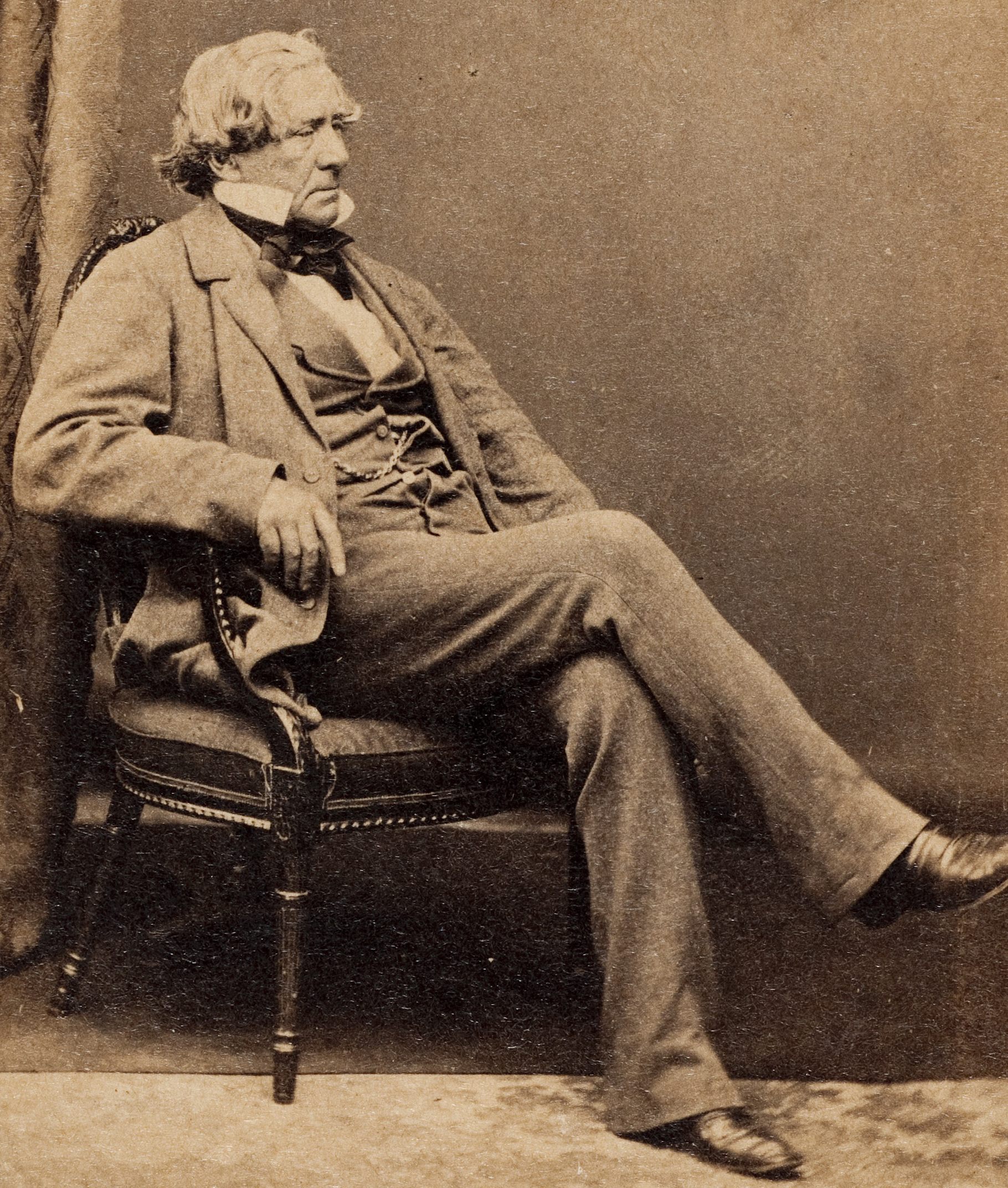
William Wentworth advocated for greater self-government, establishing Australia's first political party

Imperial legislation in 1823 had provided for a Legislative Council nominated by the governor of New South Wales, and a new Supreme Court, providing additional limits to the power of governors. A number of prominent colonial figures, including William Wentworth, campaigned for a greater degree of self-government, although there were divisions about the extent to which a future legislative body should be popularly elected. Other issues included traditional British political rights, land policy, transportation and whether a large population of convicts and former convicts could be trusted with self-government. The Australian Patriotic Association was formed in 1835 by Wentworth and William Bland to promote representative government for New South Wales.

The opening of Australia's first elected Parliament in Sydney (c. 1843)

Transportation to New South Wales was suspended in 1840. In 1842 Britain granted limited representative government to the colony by reforming the Legislative Council so that two-thirds of its members would be elected by male voters. However, a property qualification meant that only 20 per cent of males were eligible to vote in the first Legislative Council elections in 1843.

The increasing number of free settlers and people born in the colonies led to further agitation for liberal and democratic reforms. In the Port Phillip District there was agitation for representative government and independence from New South Wales. In 1850, Britain granted Van Diemen's Land, South Australia and the newly created colony of Victoria semi-elected Legislative Councils on the New South Wales model.

==== Gold rushes of the 1850s ====
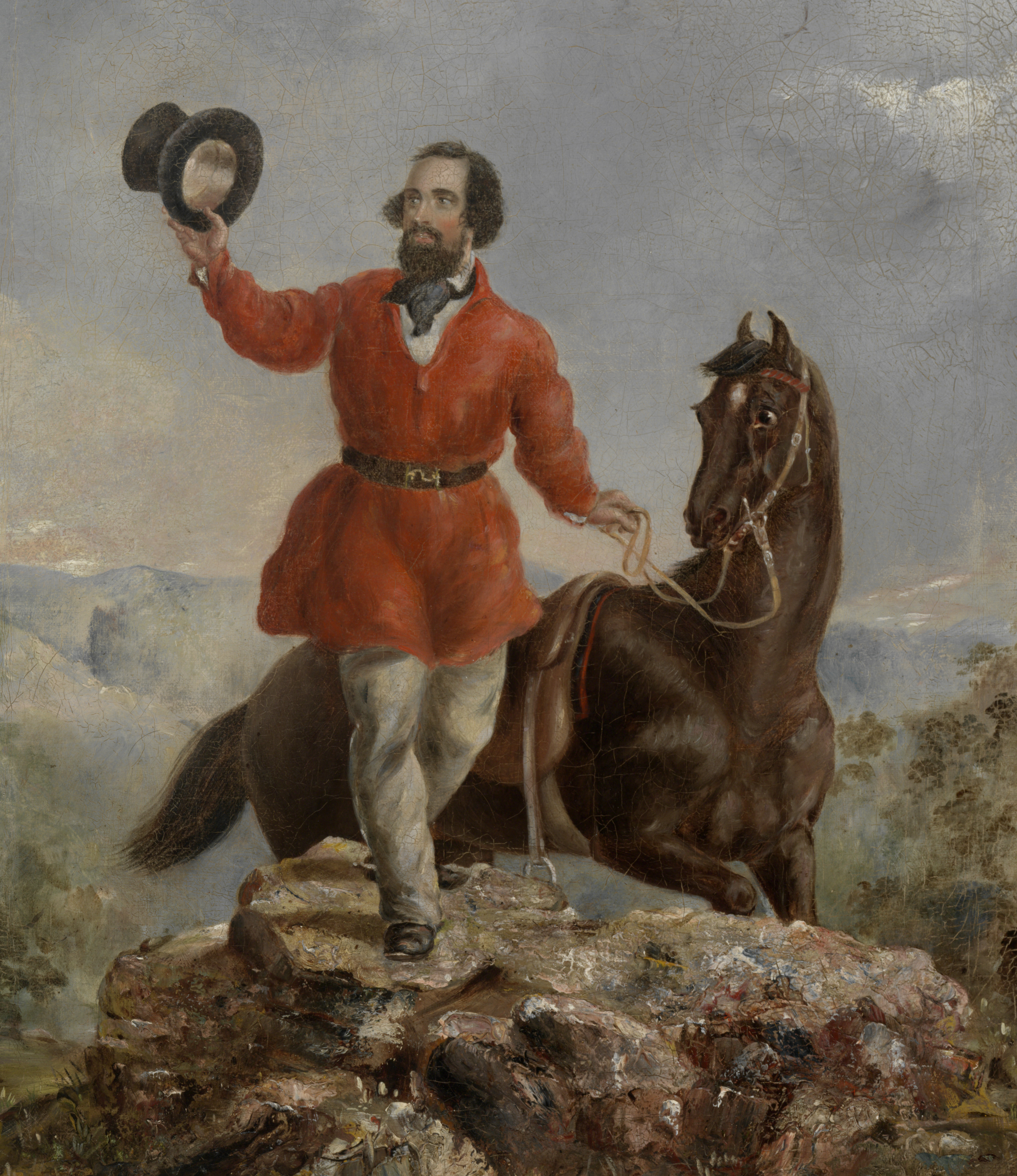
Mr E.H. Hargraves, The Gold Discoverer of Australia, Feb 12th 1851 returning the salute of the gold miners – Thomas Tyrwhitt Balcombe

In February 1851, Edward Hargraves discovered gold near Bathurst, New South Wales. Further discoveries were made later that year in Victoria, where the richest gold fields were found. New South Wales and Victoria introduced a gold mining licence with a monthly fee, the revenue being used to offset the cost of providing infrastructure, administration and policing of the goldfields.

The gold rush initially caused inflation and labour shortages as male workers moved to the goldfields. Immigrants poured in from Britain, Europe, the United States and China, many of whom sought to go to the goldfields. The Australian population increased from 430,000 in 1851 to 1,170,000 in 1861. Victoria became the most populous colony and Melbourne the largest city.

Chinese migration was a particular concern for colonial officials due to the widespread belief that it represented a danger to white Australian living standards and morality. Colonial governments responded by imposing taxes and restrictions on Chinese migrants and residents. Anti-Chinese riots erupted on the Victorian goldfields in 1856 and in New South Wales in 1860.

==== Eureka stockade ====
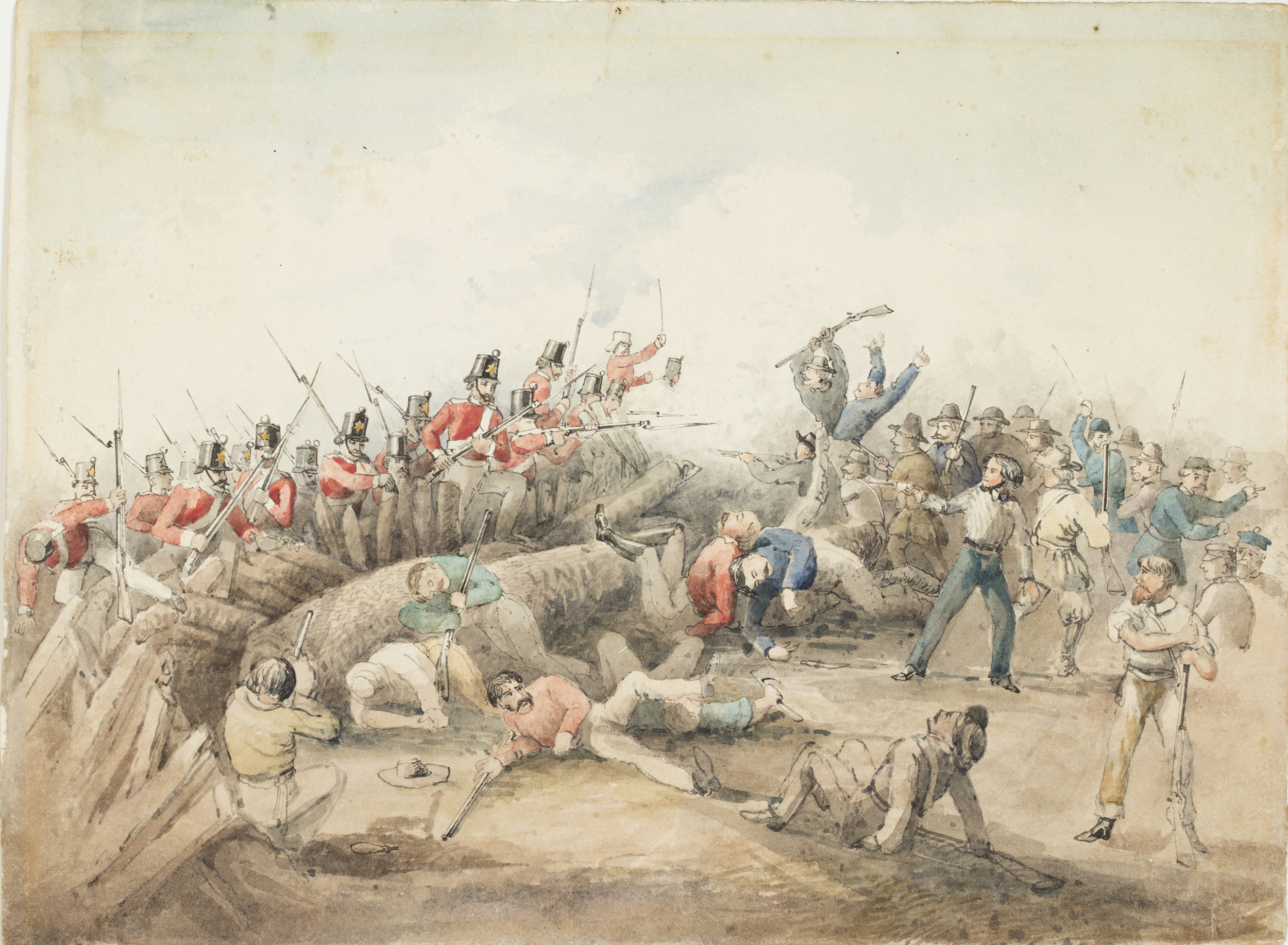
Eureka Stockade Riot. J. B. Henderson (1854) watercolour

Faced with increasing competition, Victorian miners increasingly complained about the licence fee, corrupt and heavy-handed officials, and the lack of voting rights for itinerant miners. Protests intensified in October 1854 when three miners were arrested following a riot at Ballarat. Protesters formed the Ballarat Reform League to support the arrested men and demanded manhood suffrage, reform of the mining licence and administration, and land reform to promote small farms. Further protests followed and protesters built a stockade on the Eureka Field at Ballarat. On 3 December troops overran the stockade, killing about 20 protesters. Five troops were killed and 12 seriously wounded.

Following a Royal Commission, the monthly licence was replaced with a cheaper annual miner's right which gave holders the right to vote and build a dwelling on the goldfields. The administration of the Victorian goldfields was also reformed. The Eureka rebellion soon became a part of Australian nationalist mythology.

==== Self-government and democracy ====
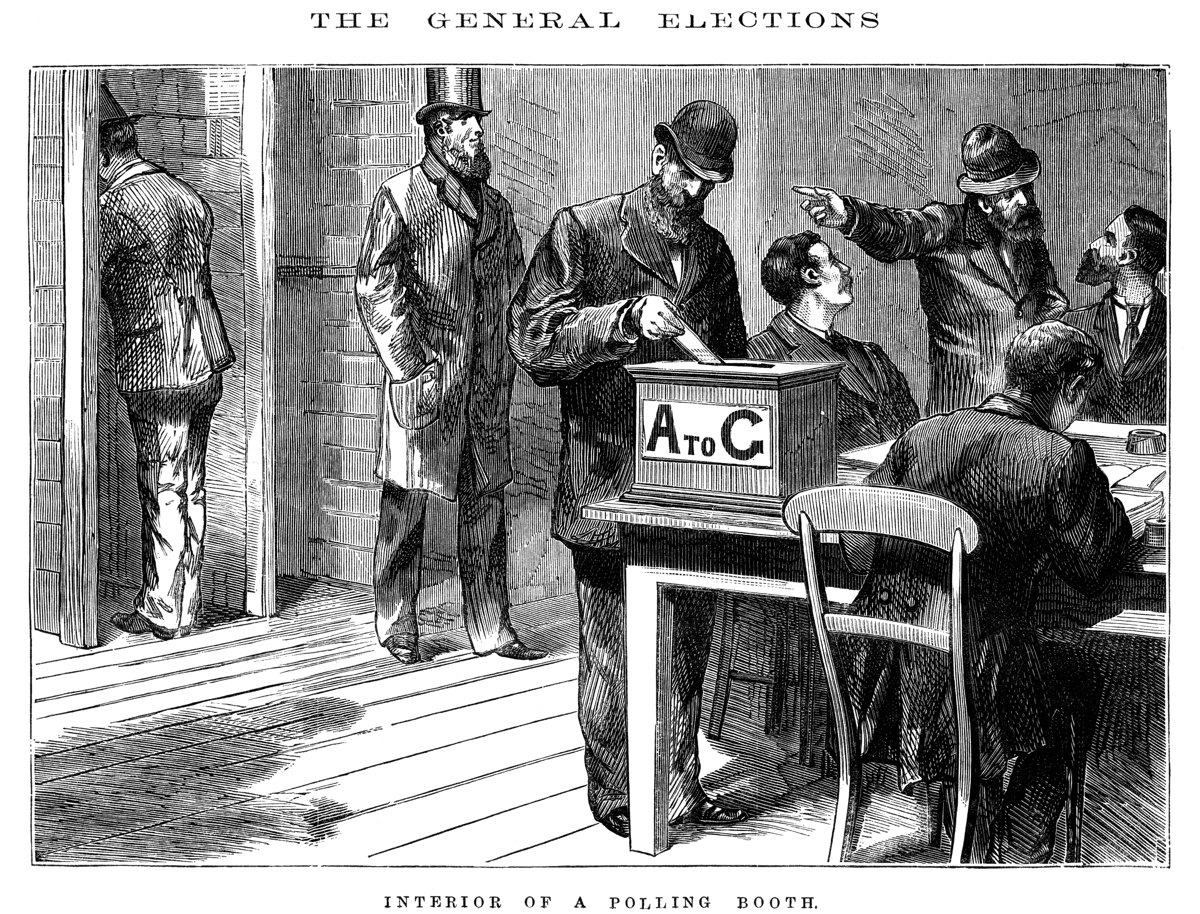
A polling booth in Melbourne – David Syme and Co (c. 1880)

Elections for the semi-representative Legislative Councils, held in New South Wales, Victoria, South Australia and Van Diemen's Land in 1851, produced a greater number of liberal members who agitated for full self-government. In 1852, the British Government announced that convict transportation to Van Diemen's Land would cease and invited the eastern colonies to draft constitutions enabling self-government.

The constitutions for New South Wales, Victoria and Van Diemen's Land (renamed Tasmania in 1856) gained Royal Assent in 1855, that for South Australia in 1856. The constitutions varied, but each created a lower house elected on a broad male franchise and an upper house which was either appointed for life (New South Wales) or elected on a more restricted property franchise. When Queensland became a separate colony in 1859 it immediately became self-governing. Western Australia was granted self-government in 1890.

The secret ballot was adopted in Tasmania, Victoria and South Australia in 1856, followed by New South Wales (1858), Queensland (1859) and Western Australia (1877). South Australia introduced universal male suffrage for its lower house in 1856, followed by Victoria in 1857, New South Wales (1858), Queensland (1872), Western Australia (1893) and Tasmania (1900). Queensland excluded Aboriginal males from voting in 1885. In Western Australia a property qualification for voting existed for male Aboriginals, Asians, Africans and people of mixed descent.

Societies to promote women's suffrage were formed in Victoria in 1884, South Australia in 1888 and New South Wales in 1891. The Women's Christian Temperance Union also established branches in most Australian colonies in the 1880s, promoting votes for women and a range of social causes. Female suffrage, and the right to stand for office, was first won in South Australia in 1895. Women won the vote in Western Australia in 1899, with racial restrictions. Women in the rest of Australia only won full rights to vote and to stand for elected office in the decade after Federation, although there were some racial restrictions.

=== The long boom (1860 to 1890) ===
From the 1850s to 1871 gold was Australia's largest export and allowed the colonies to import a range of consumer and capital goods. The increase in population in the decades following the gold rush stimulated demand for housing, consumer goods, services and urban infrastructure.

In the 1860s, New South Wales, Victoria, Queensland and South Australia introduced Selection Acts intended to promote family farms and mixed farming and grazing. Improvements in farming technology and the introduction of crops adapted to Australian conditions eventually led to the diversification of rural land use. The expansion of the railways from the 1860s allowed wheat to be cheaply transported in bulk, stimulating the development of a wheat belt from South Australia to Queensland.

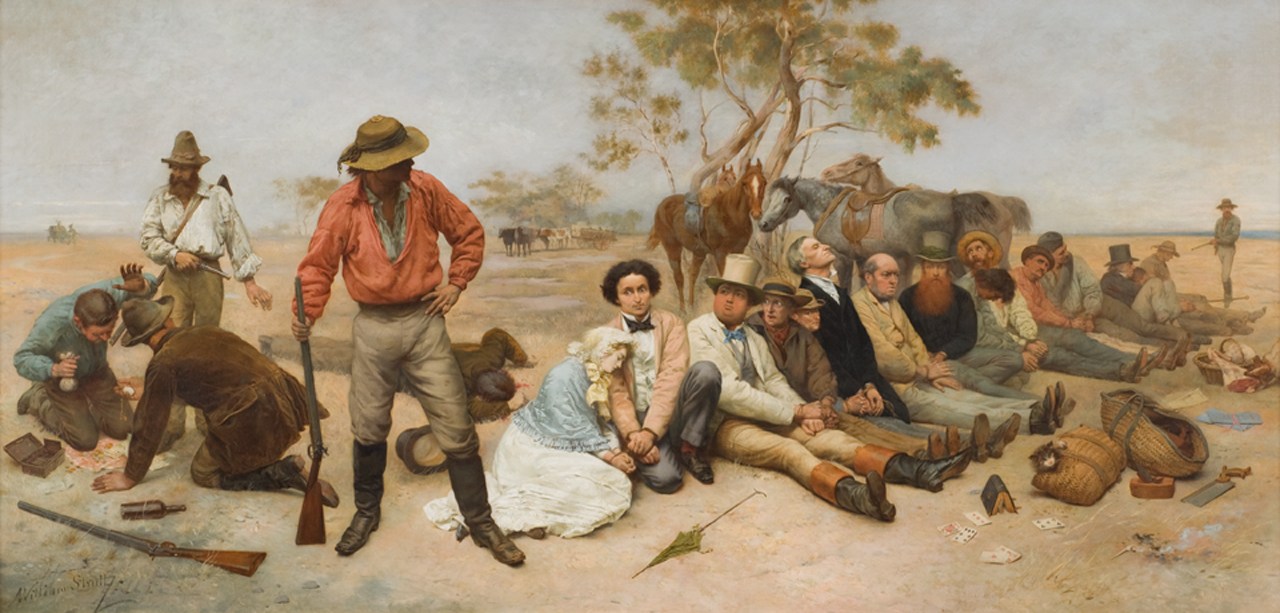
William Strutt's Bushrangers on the St Kilda Road (1887), scene of frequent hold-ups during the Victorian gold rush by bushrangers known as the St Kilda Road robberies.

The period 1850 to 1880 saw a revival in bushranging. The resurgence of bushranging from the 1850s drew on the grievances of the rural poor (several members of the Kelly gang, the most famous bushrangers, were the sons of impoverished small farmers). The exploits of Ned Kelly and his gang garnered considerable local community support and extensive national press coverage at the time. After Kelly's capture and execution for murder in 1880 his story inspired numerous works of art, literature and popular culture and continuing debate about the extent to which he was a rebel fighting social injustice and oppressive police, or a murderous criminal.

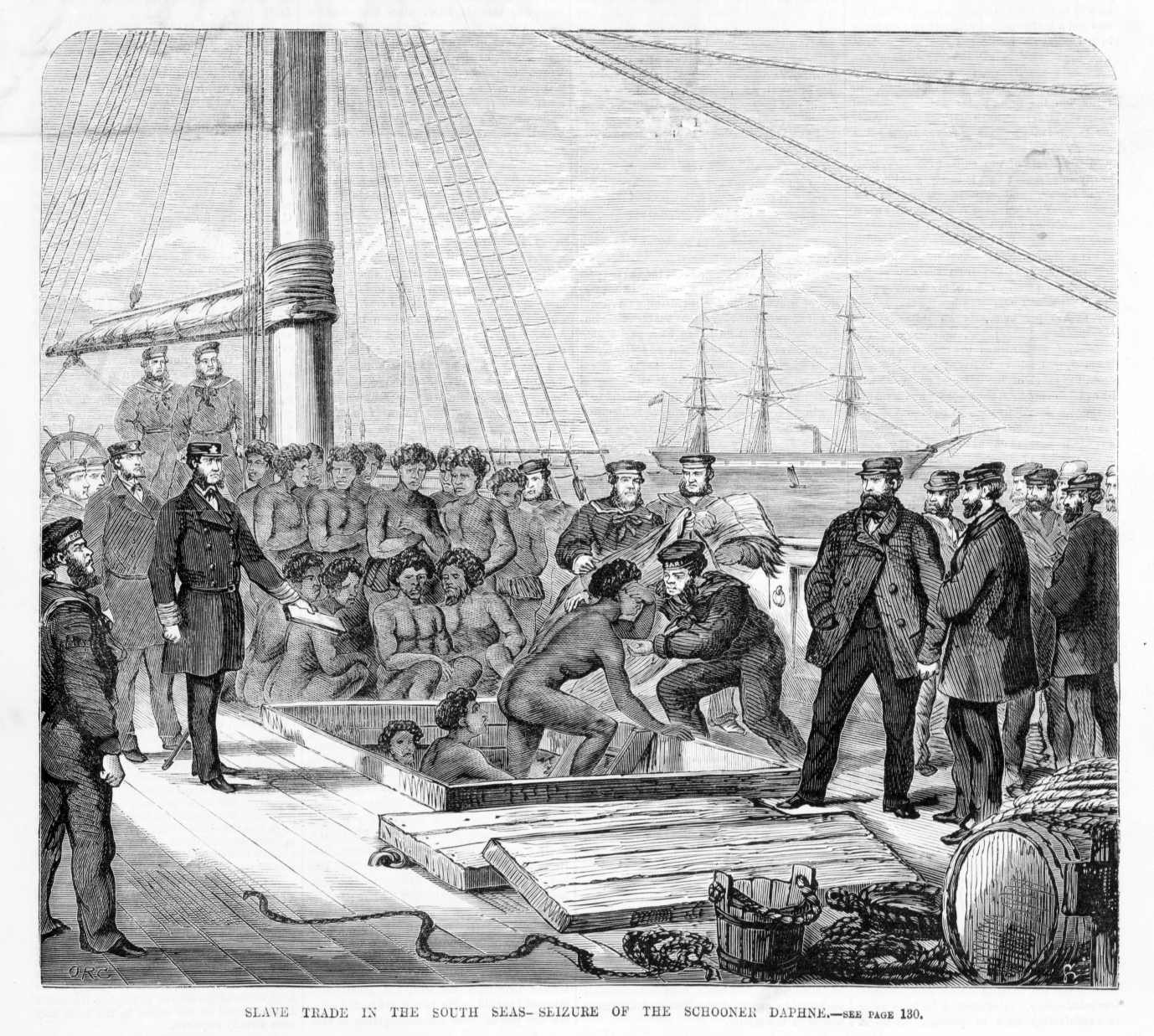
Seizure of blackbirder ship Daphne c. 1869. The Pacific Slave trade operated between 1863 and 1904, and saw tens of thousands of South Sea Islanders brought to the sugarcane plantations of Queensland either as indentured workers or slaves.

By the 1880s half the Australian population lived in towns, making Australia more urbanised than the United Kingdom, the United States and Canada. Between 1870 and 1890 average income per person in Australia was more than 50 per cent higher than that of the United States, giving Australia one of the highest living standards in the world.

The size of the government sector almost doubled from 10 per cent of national expenditure in 1850 to 19 per cent in 1890. Colonial governments spent heavily on infrastructure such as railways, ports, telegraph, schools and urban services. Much of the money for this infrastructure was borrowed on the London financial markets, but land-rich governments also sold land to finance expenditure and keep taxes low.

In 1856, building workers in Sydney and Melbourne were the first in the world to win the eight hour working day. The 1880s saw trade unions grow and spread to lower skilled workers and also across colonial boundaries. By 1890 about 20 per cent of male workers belonged to a union, one of the highest rates in the world.

Economic growth was accompanied by expansion into northern Australia. Gold was discovered in northern Queensland in the 1860s and 1870s, and in the Kimberley and Pilbara regions of Western Australia in the 1880s. Sheep and cattle runs spread to northern Queensland and on to the Gulf Country of the Northern Territory and the Kimberley region of Western Australia in the 1870s and 1880s. Sugar plantations also expanded in northern Queensland during the same period.

From the late 1870s trade unions, Anti-Chinese Leagues and other community groups campaigned against Chinese immigration and low-wage Chinese labour. Following inter-colonial conferences on the issue in 1880–81 and 1888, colonial governments responded with a series of laws which progressively restricted Chinese immigration and citizenship rights.

=== 1890s depression ===
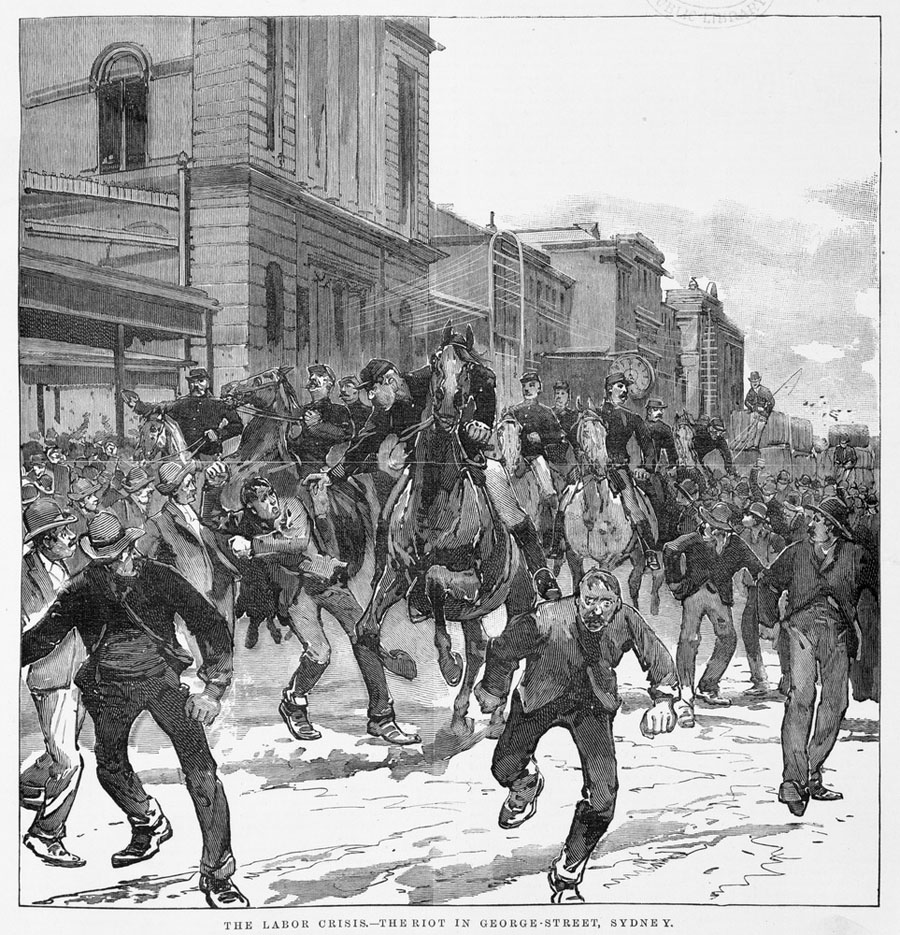
"The labor crisis. – The riot in George Street, Sydney" (c. 1890)

Falling wool prices and the collapse of a speculative property bubble in Melbourne marked the end of the long boom. A number of major banks suspended business and the economy contracted by 20 per cent from 1891 to 1895. Unemployment rose to almost a third of the workforce. The depression was followed by the "Federation Drought" from 1895 to 1903.

In 1890, a strike in the shipping industry spread to wharves, railways, mines and shearing sheds. Employers responded by locking out workers and employing non-union labour, and colonial governments intervened with police and troops. The strike failed, as did subsequent strikes of shearers in 1891 and 1894, and miners in 1892 and 1896.

The defeat of the 1890 Maritime Strike led trade unions to form political parties. In New South Wales, the Labor Electoral League won a quarter of seats in the elections of 1891 and held the balance of power between the Free Trade Party and the Protectionist Party. Labor parties also won seats in the South Australian and Queensland elections of 1893. The world's first Labor government was formed in Queensland in 1899, but it lasted only a week.

At an Inter-colonial Conference in 1896, the colonies agreed to extend restrictions on Chinese immigration to "all coloured races". Labor supported the Reid government of New South Wales in passing the Coloured Races Restriction and Regulation Act, a forerunner of the White Australia Policy. However, after Britain and Japan voiced objections to the legislation, New South Wales, Tasmania and Western Australia instead introduced European language tests to restrict "undesirable" immigrants.

=== Growth of nationalism ===
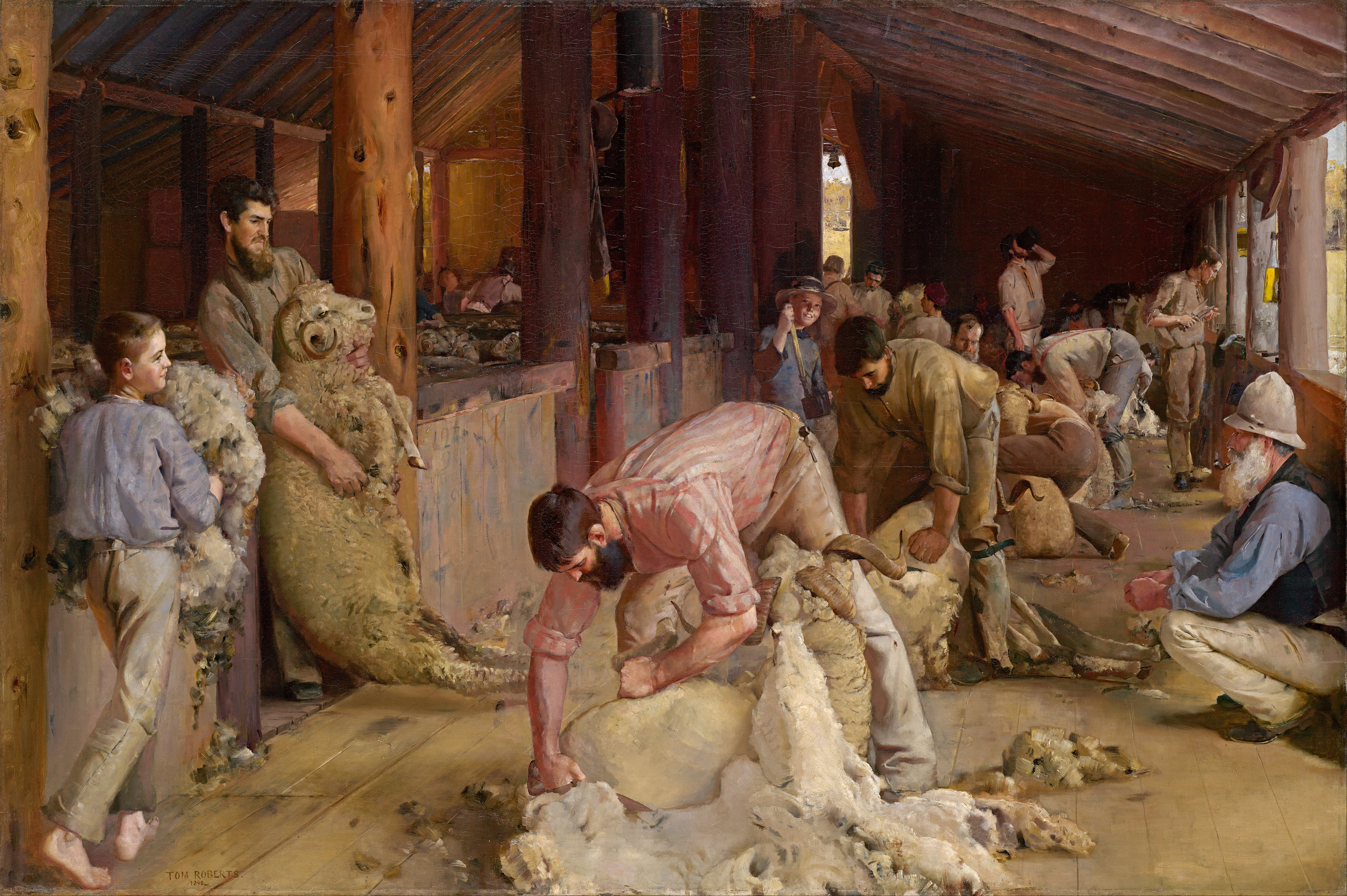
The origins of a distinctly Australian style of painting are often associated with the Heidelberg School movement, Tom Roberts' Shearing the Rams (1890) being an iconic example.

By the late 1880s, a majority of people living in the Australian colonies were native born, although more than 90 per cent were of British and Irish heritage. The Australian Natives Association, campaigned for an Australian federation within the British Empire, promoted Australian literature and history, and successfully lobbied for 26 January to be Australia's national day.

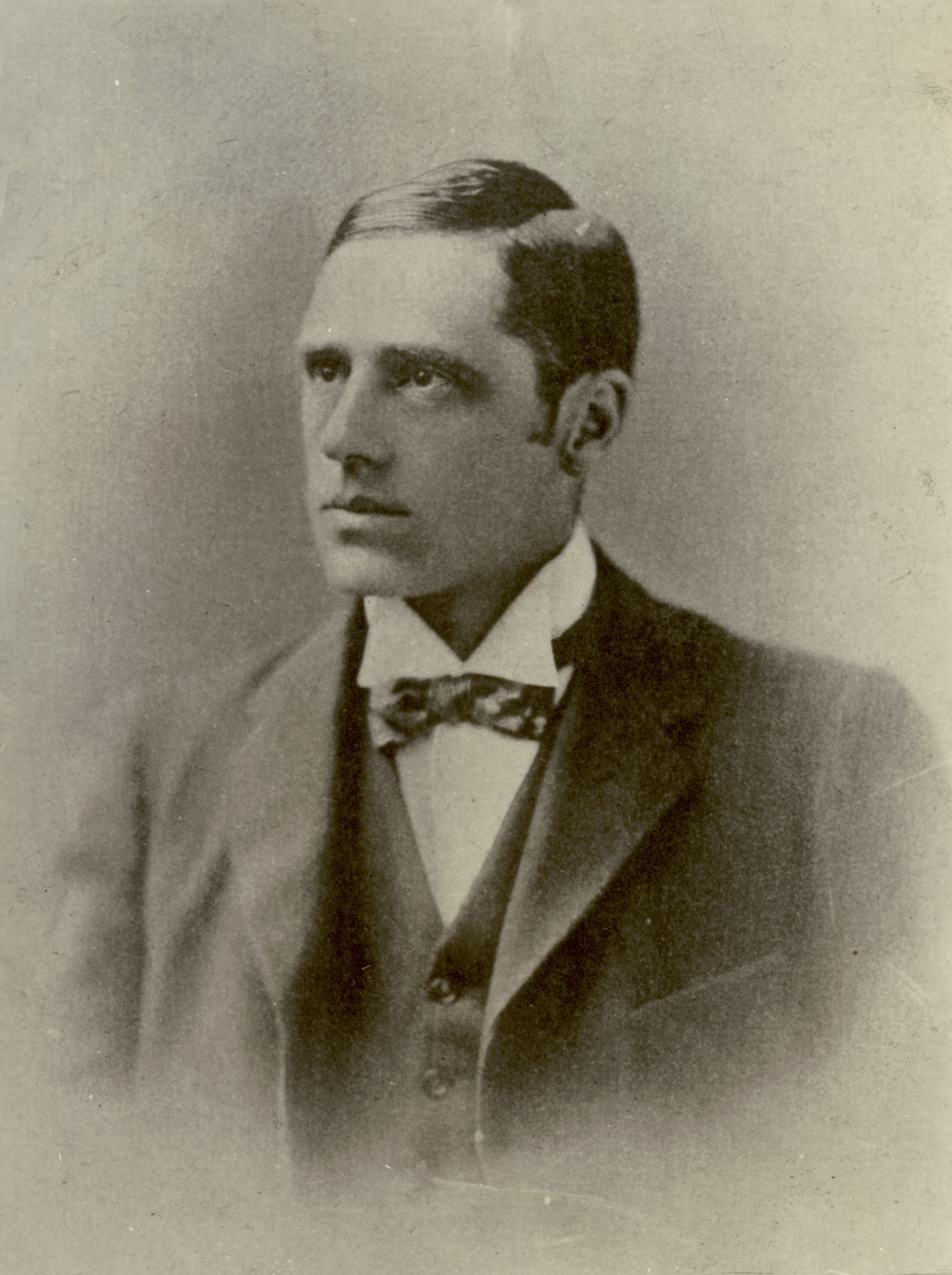
The bush balladeer Banjo Paterson penned a number of classic works including "Waltzing Matilda" (1895), regarded as Australia's unofficial national anthem.

Many nationalists spoke of Australians sharing common blood as members of the British "race". Henry Parkes stated in 1890, "The crimson thread of kinship runs through us all...we must unite as one great Australian people."

A minority of nationalists saw a distinctive Australian identity rather than shared "Britishness" as the basis for a unified Australia. Some, such as the radical magazine The Bulletin and the Tasmanian attorney-general Andrew Inglis Clark, were republicans, while others were prepared to accept a fully independent country of Australia with only a ceremonial role for the British monarch.

A unified Australia was usually associated with a white Australia. In 1887, The Bulletin declared that all white men who left the religious and class divisions of the old world behind were Australians. A white Australia also meant the exclusion of cheap Asian labour, an idea strongly promoted by the labour movement.

The growing nationalist sentiment in the 1880s and 1890s was associated with the development of a distinctively Australian art and literature. Artists of the Heidelberg School such as Arthur Streeton, Frederick McCubbin and Tom Roberts followed the example of the European Impressionists by painting in the open air. They applied themselves to capturing the light and colour of the Australian landscape and exploring the distinctive and the universal in the "mixed life of the city and the characteristic life of the station and the bush".

In the 1890s Henry Lawson, Banjo Paterson and other writers associated with The Bulletin produced poetry and prose exploring the nature of bush life and themes of independence, stoicism, masculine labour, egalitarianism, anti-authoritarianism and mateship. Protagonists were often shearers, boundary riders and itinerant bush workers. In the following decade Lawson, Paterson and other writers such as Steele Rudd, Miles Franklin, and Joseph Furphy helped forge a distinctive national literature. Paterson's ballad "The Man from Snowy River" (1890) achieved popularity, and his lyrics to the song "Waltzing Matilda" (c. 1895) helped make it the unofficial national anthem for many Australians.

=== Federation movement ===
Growing nationalist sentiment coincided with business concerns about the economic inefficiency of customs barriers between the colonies, the duplication of services by colonial governments and the lack of a single national market for goods and services. Colonial concerns about German and French ambitions in the region also led to British pressure for a federated Australian defence force and a unified, single-gauge railway network for defence purposes.

A Federal Council of Australasia was formed in 1885 but it had few powers and New South Wales and South Australia declined to join.

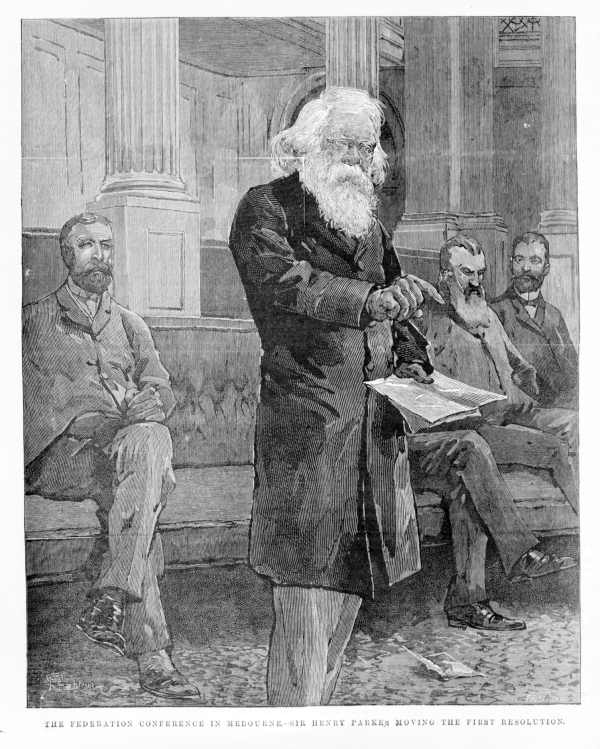
Sir Henry Parkes delivering the first resolution at the federation conference in Melbourne, 1 March 1890

An obstacle to federation was the fear of the smaller colonies that they would be dominated by New South Wales and Victoria. Queensland, in particular, although generally favouring a white Australia policy, wished to maintain an exception for South Sea Islander workers in the sugar cane industry.

Another major barrier was the free trade policies of New South Wales which conflicted with the protectionist policies dominant in Victoria and most of the other colonies. Nevertheless, the NSW premier Henry Parkes was a strong advocate of federation and his Tenterfield Oration in 1889 was pivotal in gathering support for the cause.

In 1891, a National Australasian Convention was held in Sydney, with all the colonies and New Zealand represented. A draft constitutional Bill was adopted, but the worsening economic depression and opposition in colonial parliaments delayed progress.

Citizen Federation Leagues were formed, and at a conference in Corowa in July 1893 they developed a new plan for federation involving a constitutional convention with directly elected delegates and a referendum in each colony to endorse the proposed constitution. The new NSW premier, George Reid, endorsed the "Corowa plan" and in 1895 convinced the majority of other premiers to adopt it.

All of the colonies except Queensland sent representatives to a constitutional convention which held sessions in 1897 and 1898. The convention drafted a proposed constitution for a Commonwealth of federated states under the British Crown.

Referendums held in 1898 resulted in solid majorities for the constitution in Victoria, South Australia and Tasmania. However, the referendum failed to gain the required majority in New South Wales. The premiers of the other colonies agreed to a number of concessions to New South Wales (particularly that the future Commonwealth capital would be located in that state), and in 1899 further referendums were held in all the colonies except Western Australia. All resulted in yes votes.

In March 1900, delegates were dispatched to London, including leading federation advocates Edmund Barton and Alfred Deakin. Following negotiations with the British government, the federation Bill was passed by the imperial parliament on 5 July 1900 and gained Royal Assent on 9 July. Western Australia subsequently voted to join the new federation.

== From federation to war (1901–1914) ==
Edmund Barton (left), the first Prime Minister of Australia, with Alfred Deakin, the second prime minister

The Commonwealth of Australia was proclaimed by the Governor-General, Lord Hopetoun on 1 January 1901, and Barton was sworn in as Australia's first prime minister. The first Federal elections were held in March 1901 and resulted in a narrow plurality for the Protectionist Party over the Free Trade Party with the Australian Labor Party (ALP) polling third. Labor declared it would support the party which offered concessions to its program, and Barton's Protectionists formed a government, with Deakin as Attorney-General.

The Immigration Restriction Act 1901 was one of the first laws passed by the new Australian parliament. This centrepiece of the White Australia policy, the act used a dictation test in a European language to exclude Asian migrants, who were considered a threat to Australia's living standards and majority British culture.

With federation, the Commonwealth inherited the small defence forces of the six former Australian colonies. By 1901, units of soldiers from all six Australian colonies had been active as part of British forces in the Boer War. When the British government asked for more troops from Australia in early 1902, the Australian government obliged with a national contingent. Some 16,500 men had volunteered for service by the war's end in June 1902.

In 1902, the government introduced female suffrage in the Commonwealth jurisdiction, but at the same time excluded Aboriginal people from the franchise unless they already had the vote in a state jurisdiction.

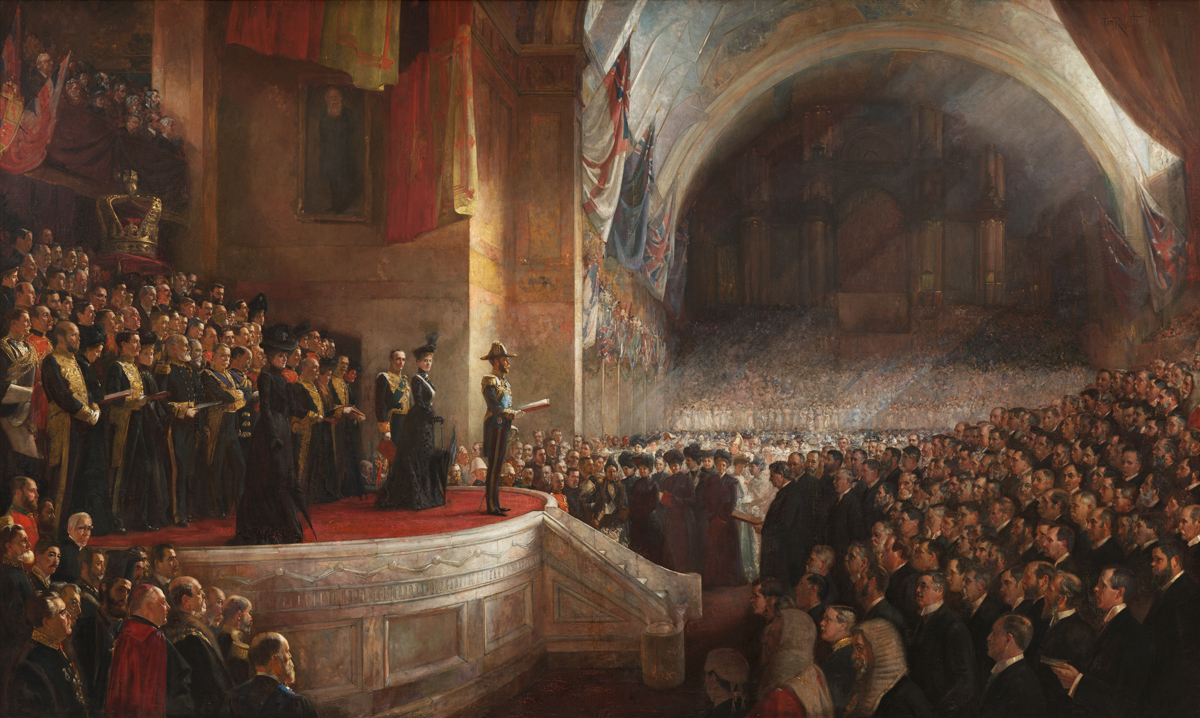
Opening of the first Parliament of Australia in 1901

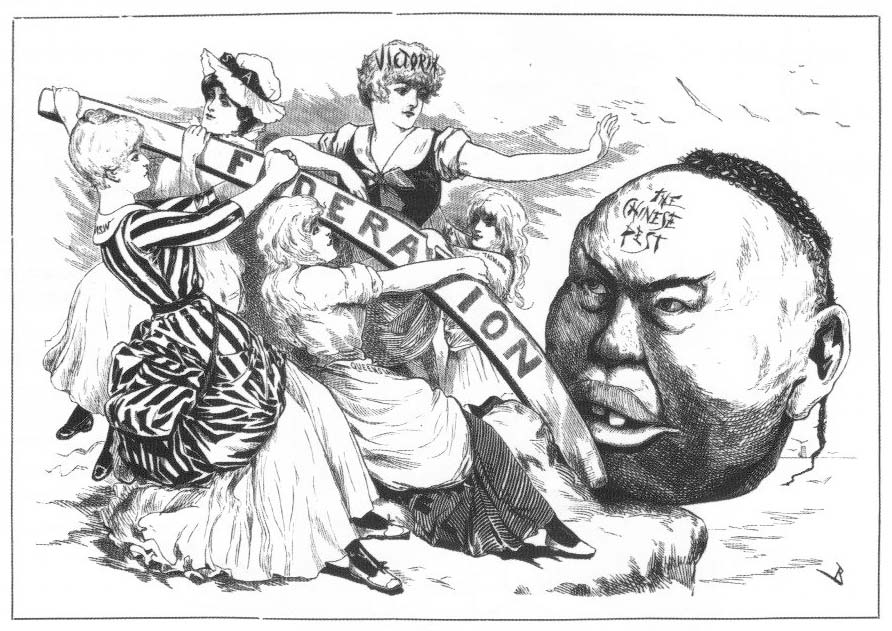
Implementing the White Australia policy was one of the first acts of the new parliament. Pictured: The Melbourne Punch (c. May 1888)

The government also introduced a tariff on imports, designed to raise revenue and protect Australian industry. However, disagreements over industrial relations legislation led to the fall of Deakin's Protectionist government in April 1904 and the appointment of the first national Labor government under prime minister Chris Watson. The Watson government itself fell in April and a Free Trade government under prime minister Reid successfully introduced legislation for a Commonwealth Conciliation and Arbitration Court to settle interstate industrial disputes.

In July 1905, Deakin formed a Protectionist government with the support of Labor. The new government embarked on a series of social reforms and a program dubbed the New Protection under which tariff protection for Australian industries would be linked to their provision of "fair and reasonable" wages. In the Harvester case of 1907, H. B. Higgins of the Conciliation and Arbitration Court set a basic wage based on the needs of a male breadwinner supporting a wife and three children. By 1914 the Commonwealth and all the states had introduced systems to settle industrial disputes and fix wages and conditions.

The base of the Labor Party was the Australian Trade Union movement which grew from under 100,000 members in 1901 to more than half a million in 1914. The party also drew considerable support from clerical workers, Catholics and small farmers. In 1905, the Labor party adopted objectives at the federal level which included the "cultivation of an Australian sentiment based upon the maintenance of racial purity" and "the collective ownership of monopolies". In the same year, the Queensland branch of the party adopted an overtly socialist objective.

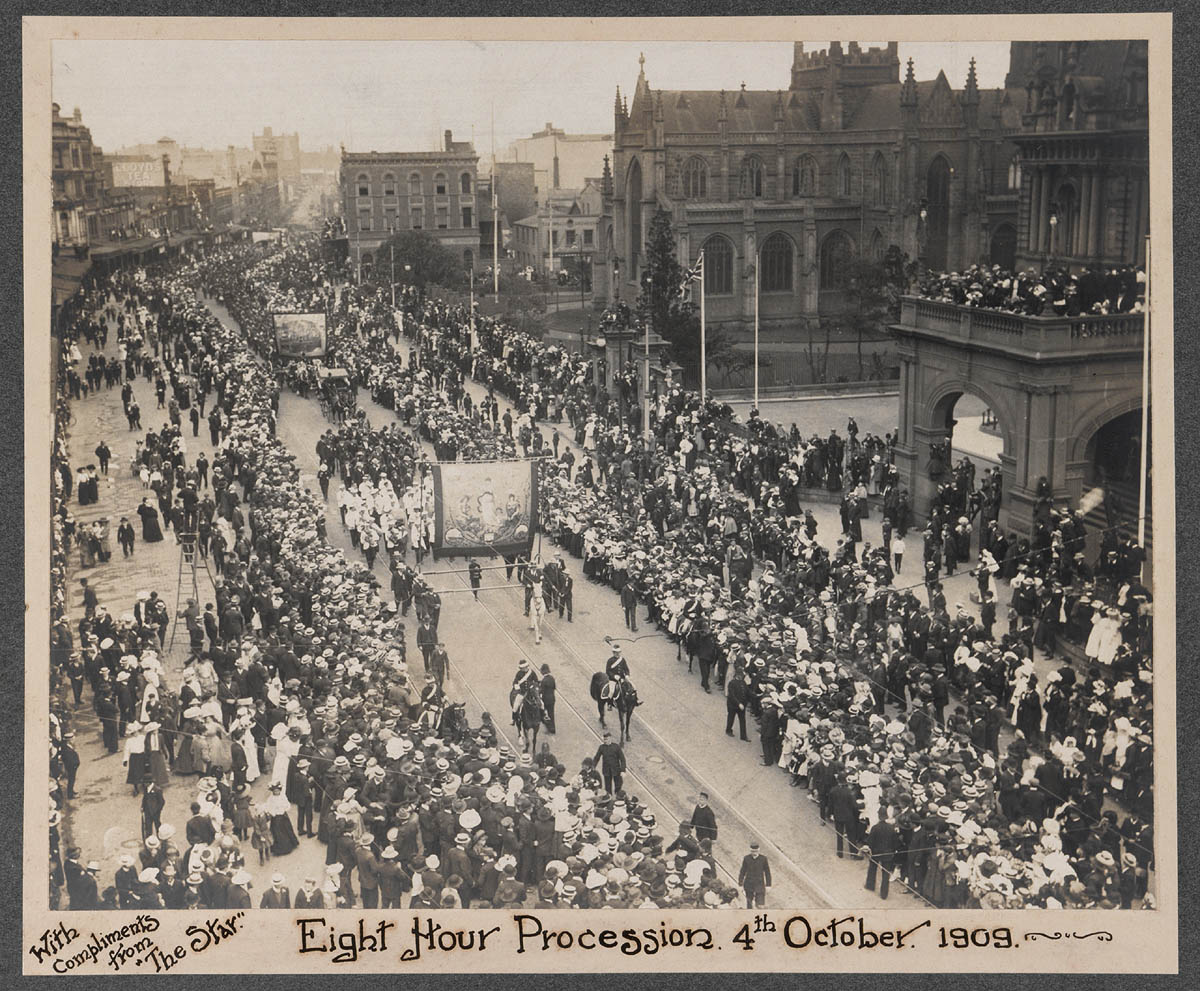
Procession in support of an eight-hour work day, George Street, Sydney, 4 October 1909

After the December 1906 elections Deakin's Protectionist government remained in power, but following the passage of legislation for old age pensions and a new protective tariff in 1908, Labor withdrew its support for the government. In November, Andrew Fisher became the second Labor prime minister. In response, opposition parties formed an anti-Labor coalition and Deakin became prime minister in June 1909.

In the elections of May 1910, Labor won a majority in both houses of parliament and Fisher again became prime minister. The Labor government introduced a series of reforms including a progressive land tax (1910), invalid pensions (1910) and a maternity allowance (1912). The government established the Commonwealth Bank (1911) but referendums to nationalise monopolies and extend Commonwealth trade and commerce powers were defeated in 1911 and 1913. The Commonwealth took over responsibility for the Northern Territory from South Australia in 1911. The government increased defence spending, expanding the system of compulsory military training which had been introduced by the previous government and establishing the Royal Australian Navy.

The new Commonwealth Liberal Party won the May 1913 elections and former Labor leader Joseph Cook became prime minister. The Cook government's attempt to pass legislation abolishing preferential treatment for union members in the Commonwealth Public Service triggered a double dissolution of parliament. Labor comfortably won the September 1914 elections and Fisher resumed office.

The prewar period saw strong growth in the population and economy. The economy grew by 75 per cent, with rural industries, construction, manufacturing and government services leading the way. The population increased from four million in 1901 to five million in 1914. From 1910 to 1914 just under 300,000 migrants arrived, all white, and almost all from Britain.

== World War I ==
=== Australia at war (1914–18) ===
When the United Kingdom declared war on Germany on 4 August 1914, the declaration automatically involved all of Britain's colonies and dominions. Both major parties offered Britain 20,000 Australian troops. As the Defence Act 1903 precluded sending conscripts overseas, a new volunteer force, the Australian Imperial Force (AIF), was raised to meet this commitment.

Public enthusiasm for the war was high, and the initial quota for the AIF was quickly filled. The troops left for Egypt on 1 November 1914, one of the escort ships, HMAS Sydney, sinking the German cruiser Emden along the way. Meanwhile, in September, a separate Australian expeditionary force had captured German New Guinea.

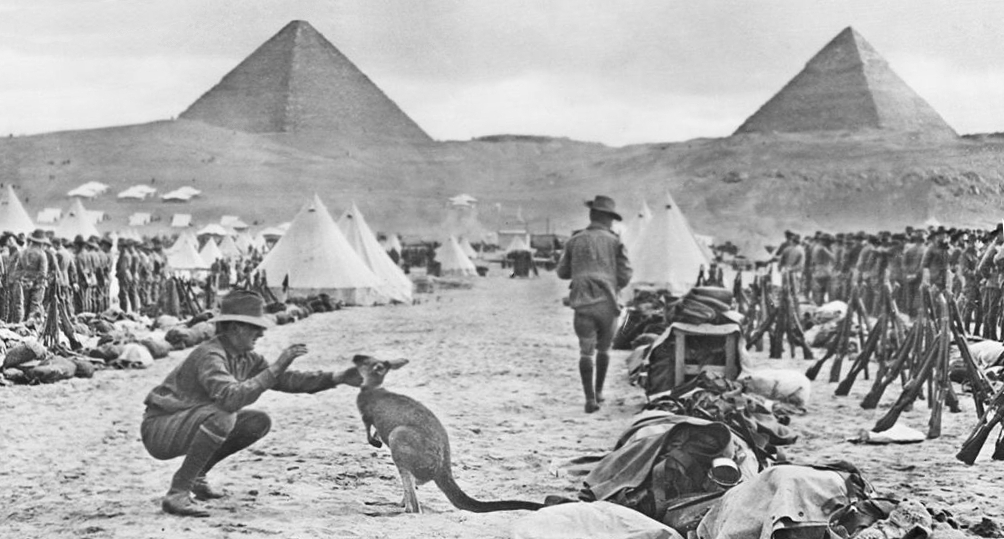
Australian soldiers in Egypt with a kangaroo as regimental mascot, 1914

After arriving in Egypt, the AIF was incorporated into an Australian and New Zealand Army Corps (ANZAC). The Anzacs formed part of the Mediterranean Expeditionary Force with the task of opening the Dardanelles to allied battleships, threatening Constantinople, the capital of the Ottoman Empire which had entered the war on the side of the Central Powers. The Anzacs, along with French, British and Indian troops, landed on the Gallipoli peninsula on 25 April 1915. The Australian and New Zealand position at Anzac Cove was vulnerable to attack and the troops suffered heavy losses in establishing a narrow beachhead. After it had become clear that the expeditionary force would be unable to achieve its objectives, the Anzacs were evacuated in December, followed by the British and French in early January.

The Australians suffered about 8,000 deaths in the campaign. Australian war correspondents variously emphasised the bravery and fighting qualities of the Australians and the errors of their British commanders. The 25 April soon became an Australian national holiday known as Anzac Day, centring on themes of "nationhood, brotherhood and sacrifice".

In 1916, five infantry divisions of the AIF were sent to the Western Front. In July 1916, at Fromelles, the AIF suffered 5,533 casualties in 24 hours, the most costly single encounter in Australian military history. Elsewhere on the Somme, 23,000 Australians were killed or wounded in seven weeks of attacks on German positions. In Spring 1917, Australian troops suffered 10,000 casualties at the First Battle of Bullecourt and the Second Battle of Bullecourt. In the summer and autumn of 1917, Australian troops also sustained heavy losses during the British offensive around Ypres. Overall, almost 22,000 Australian troops were killed in 1917.

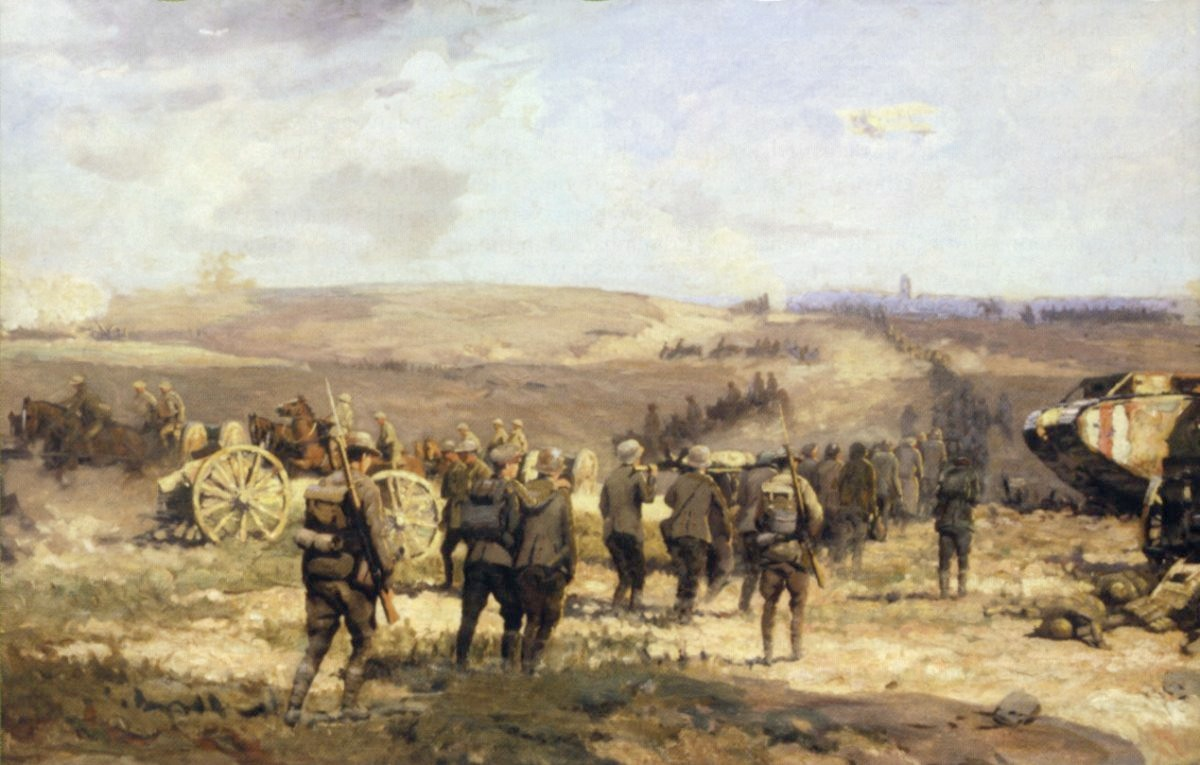
8 August 1918, by Will Longstaff. A depiction of the Battle of Amiens

In November 1917 the five Australian divisions were united in the Australian Corps, and in May 1918 the Australian general John Monash took over command. The Australian Corps was heavily involved in halting the German Spring Offensive of 1918 and in the allied counter-offensive of August that year.

In the Middle East, the Australian Light Horse brigades were prominent at the Battle of Romani in August 1916. In 1917, they participated in the allied advance through the Sinai Peninsula and into Palestine. In 1918, they pressed on through Palestine and into Syria in an advance that led to the Ottoman surrender on 31 October.

By the time the war ended on 11 November 1918, 324,000 Australians had served overseas. Casualties included 60,000 dead and 150,000 wounded—the highest casualty rate of any allied force. Australian troops also had higher rates of unauthorised absence, crime and imprisonment than other allied forces.

=== Home front ===
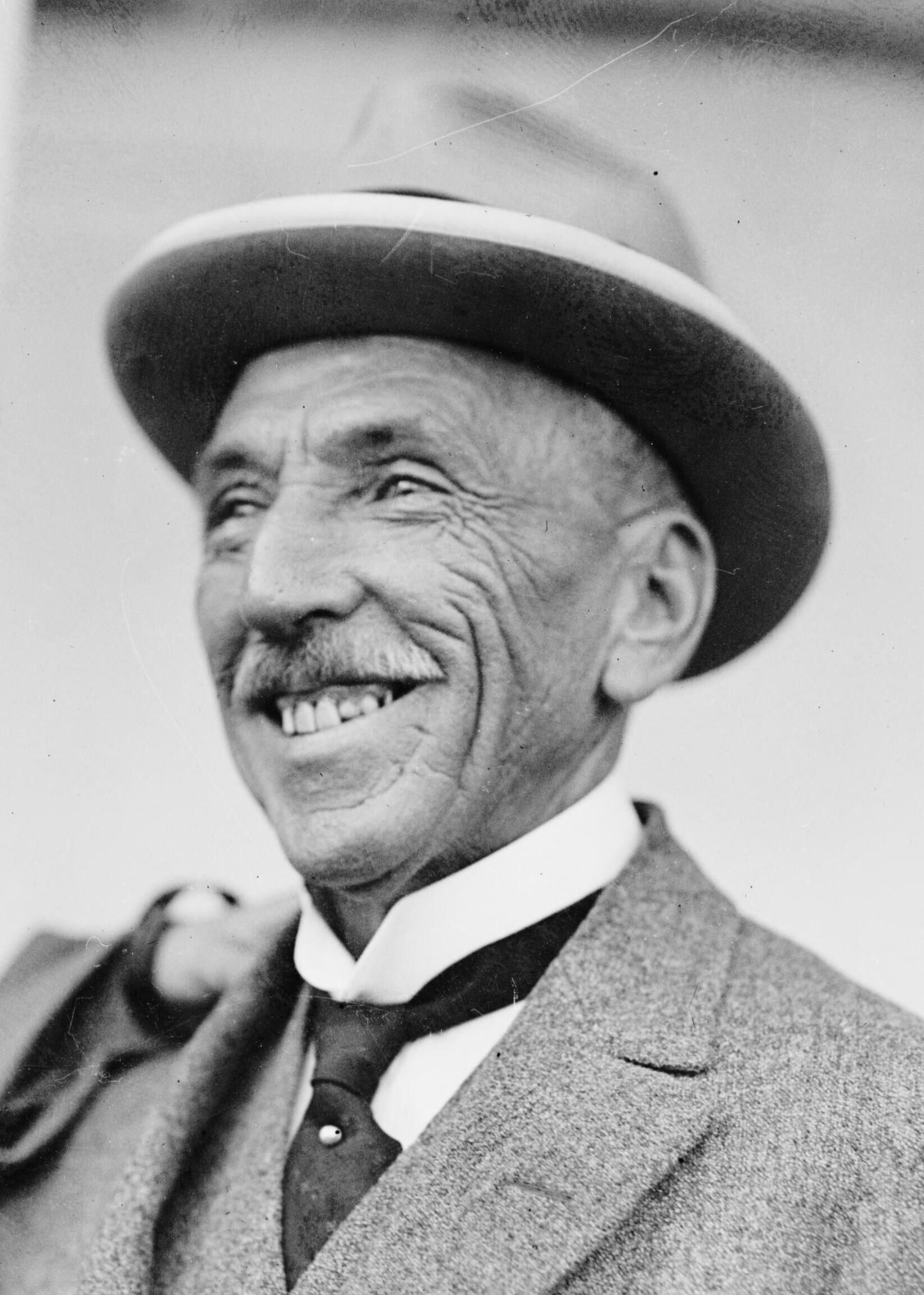
Prime Minister W. M. Hughes in 1919

In October 1914, the Fisher Labor government introduced the War Precautions Act which gave it the power to make regulations "for securing the public safety and defence of the Commonwealth". After Billy Hughes replaced Fisher as prime minister in October 1915, regulations under the act were increasingly used to censor publications, penalise public speech and suppress organisations that the government considered detrimental to the war effort. Anti-German leagues were formed and 7,000 Germans and other "enemy aliens" were sent to internment camps during the war.

The economy contracted by 10 per cent during the course of hostilities. Inflation rose in the first two years of war and real wages fell. Lower wages and perceptions of profiteering by some businesses led, in 1916, to a wave of strikes by miners, waterside workers and shearers.

Enlistments in the military also declined, falling from 35,000 a month at its peak in 1915 to 6,000 a month in 1916. In response, Hughes decided to hold a referendum on conscription for overseas service. Following the narrow defeat of the October 1916 conscription referendum, Hughes and 23 of his supporters left the parliamentary Labor party and formed a new Nationalist government with the former opposition. The Nationalists comfortably won the May 1917 elections and Hughes continued as prime minister.

From August to October 1917 there was a major strike of New South Wales railway, transport, waterside and coal workers which was defeated after the Commonwealth and New South Wales governments arrested strike leaders and organised special constables and non-union labour. A second referendum on conscription was also defeated in December. Enlistments in 1918 were the lowest for the war, leading to the disbandment of 12 battalions and mutinies in the AIF.

=== Paris peace conference ===
Hughes attended the Imperial War Conference and Imperial War Cabinet in London from June 1918 where Australia, New Zealand, Canada and South Africa won British support for their separate representation at the eventual peace conference. At the Paris Peace Conference in 1919, Hughes argued that Germany should pay the full cost of the war, but ultimately gained only £5 million in war reparations for Australia. Australia and the other self-governing British dominions won the right to become full members of the new League of Nations, and Australia obtained a special League of Nations mandate over German New Guinea allowing Australia to control trade and immigration. Australia also gained a 42 per cent share of the formerly German-ruled island of Nauru, giving access to its rich superphosphate reserves. Australia argued successfully against a Japanese proposal for a racial equality clause in the League of Nations covenant, as Hughes feared that it would jeopardise the White Australia policy. As a signatory to the Treaty of Versailles and a full member of the League of Nations, Australia took an important step towards international recognition as a sovereign nation.

== Inter-war years ==
=== Men, money and markets (1920s) ===
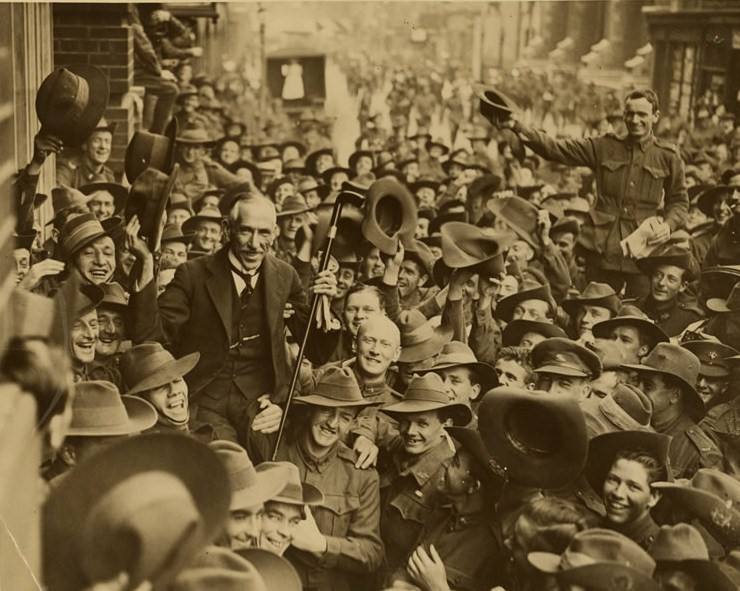
Australian soldiers carrying Prime Minister Billy Hughes, the 'little digger', down George Street, Sydney after his return from the Paris Peace Conference, 1919

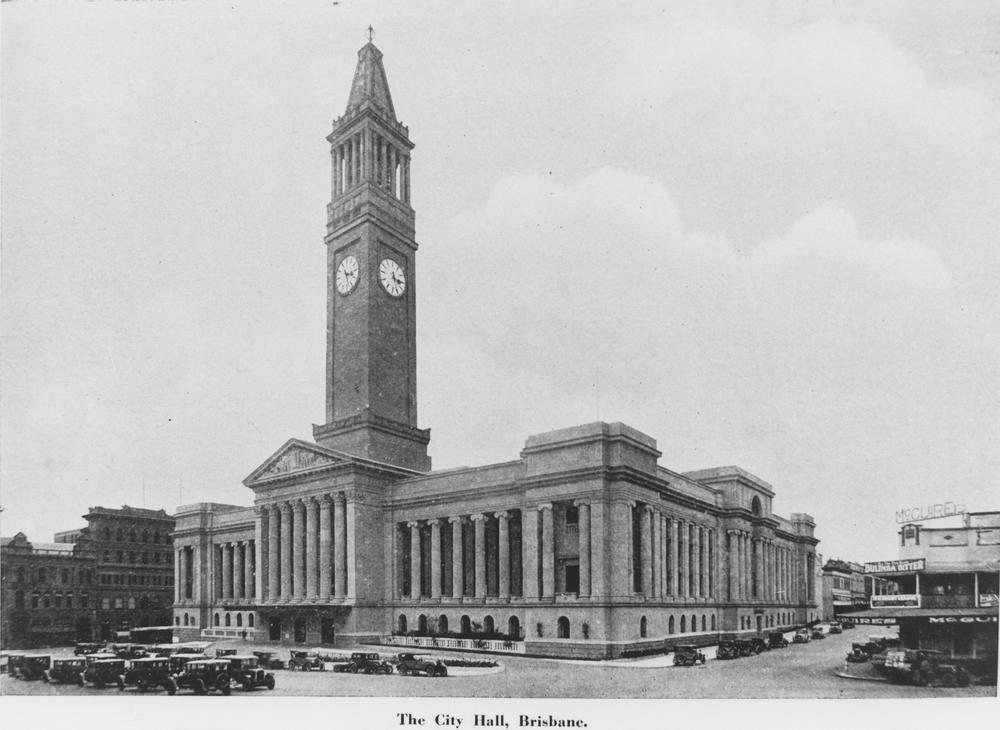
Built between 1920 and 1930, a cultural masterpiece of Australian architecture, Brisbane City Hall was one of the most expensive buildings and the second largest construction of the Inter-war period, after the Sydney Harbour Bridge.

After the war, Prime Minister Billy Hughes led a new conservative force, the Nationalist Party. It formed from the old Liberal party and breakaway elements of Labor, after the deep and bitter split over Conscription. About 12,000 died as a result of the Spanish flu pandemic of 1919.

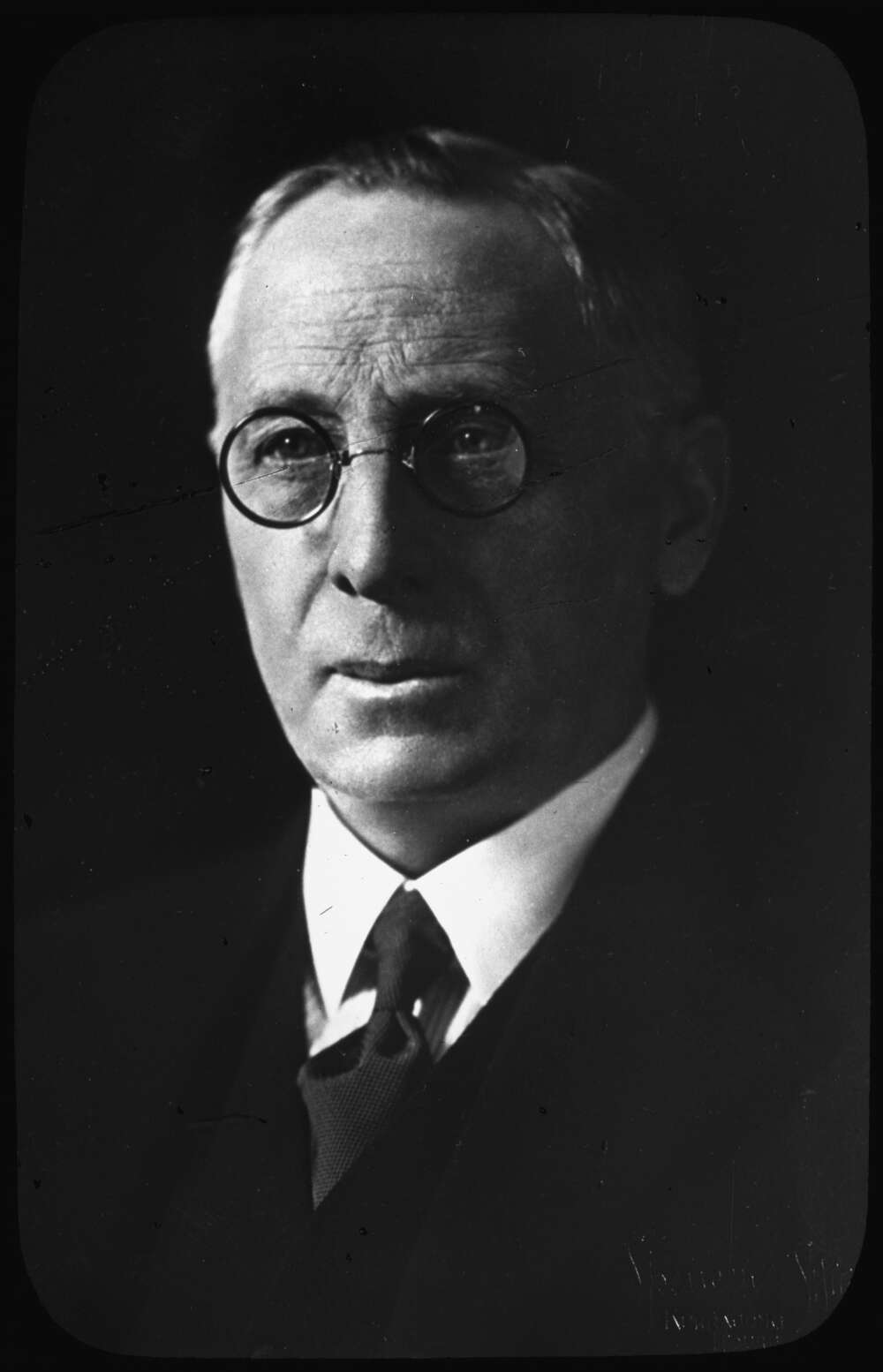
The Revd John Flynn, founder of the Royal Flying Doctor Service

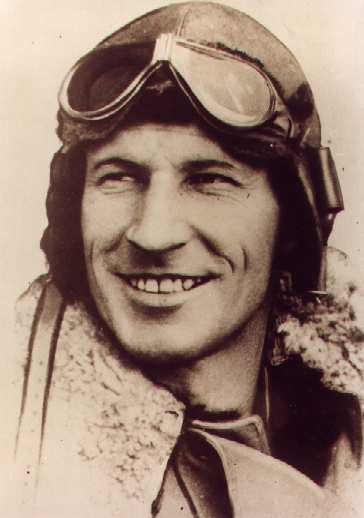
Pioneer aviator Sir Charles Kingsford Smith

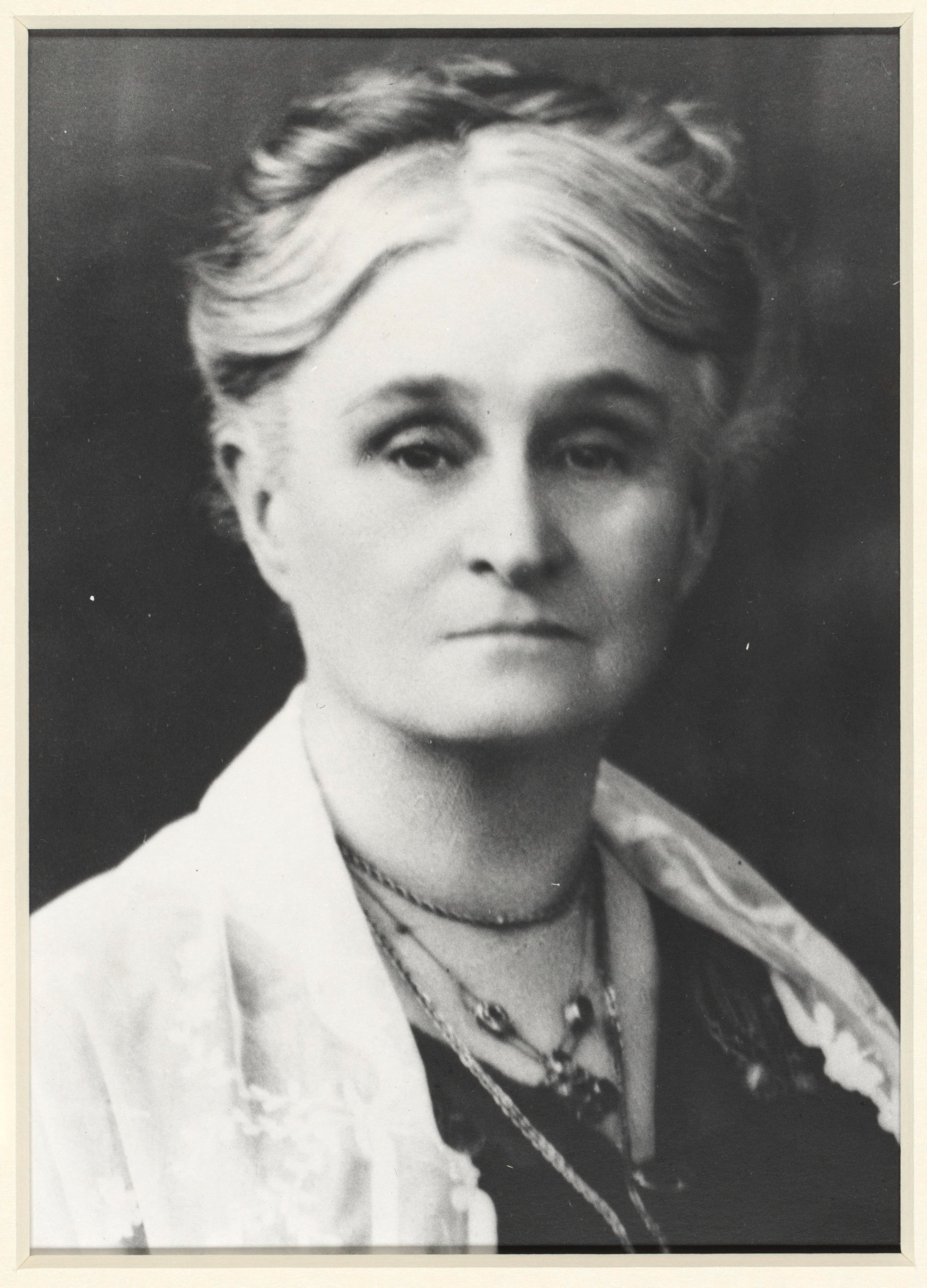
Edith Cowan (1861–1932) was elected to the Western Australian Legislative Assembly in 1921, becoming the first woman elected to any Australian Parliament.

The success of the Bolshevik Revolution in Russia posed a threat in the eyes of conservatives; to a small group of socialists it was an inspiration. The Communist Party of Australia was formed in 1920 and, though remaining electorally insignificant, it obtained some influence in the trade union movement and was banned during World War II for its support for the Molotov–Ribbentrop Pact and the Menzies Government unsuccessfully tried to ban it again during the Korean War. Despite splits, the party remained active until its dissolution at the end of the Cold War.

The Country Party (today's National Party) formed in 1920 to promulgate its version of agrarianism, which it called "Countrymindedness". The goal was to enhance the status of the graziers (operators of big sheep ranches) and small farmers, and secure subsidies for them. Enduring longer than any other major party save the Labor party, it has generally operated in coalition with the Liberal Party (since the 1940s), becoming a major party of government in Australia—particularly in Queensland.

Other significant after-effects of the war included ongoing industrial unrest, which included the 1923 Victorian Police strike. Industrial disputes characterised the 1920s in Australia. Other major strikes occurred on the waterfront, in the coalmining and timber industries in the late 1920s. The union movement had established the Australian Council of Trade Unions (ACTU) in 1927 in response to the Nationalist government's efforts to change working conditions and reduce the power of the unions.

The consumerism, entertainment culture, and new technologies that characterised the 1920s in the United States were also found in Australia. Prohibition was not implemented in Australia, though anti-alcohol forces were successful in having hotels closed after 6 pm, and closed altogether in a few city suburbs.

The fledgling film industry declined through the decade, despite more than 2 million Australians attending cinemas weekly at 1250 venues. A Royal Commission in 1927 failed to assist and the industry that had begun so brightly with the release of the world's first feature film, The Story of the Kelly Gang (1906), atrophied until its revival in the 1970s.

Stanley Bruce became prime minister in 1923, when members of the Nationalist Party Government voted to remove W.M. Hughes. Speaking in early 1925, Bruce summed up the priorities and optimism of many Australians, saying that "men, money and markets accurately defined the essential requirements of Australia" and that he was seeking such from Britain. The migration campaign of the 1920s, operated by the Development and Migration Commission, brought almost 300,000 Britons to Australia,. Schemes to settle migrants and returned soldiers "on the land" were generally not a success. "The new irrigation areas in Western Australia and the Dawson Valley of Queensland proved disastrous".

In Australia, the costs of major investment had traditionally been met by state and Federal governments and heavy borrowing from overseas was made by the governments in the 1920s. A Loan Council was set up in 1928 to co-ordinate loans, three-quarters of which came from overseas. Despite Imperial Preference, a balance of trade was not achieved with Britain. "In the five years from 1924. .. to ... 1928, Australia bought 44% of its imports from Britain and sold 39% of its exports. Wheat and wool made up more than two-thirds of all Australian exports", a dangerous reliance on just two export commodities.

Australia embraced the new technologies of transport and communication. Improvements in rail and motor transport generated dramatic changes in work and leisure. In 1918, there were 50,000 cars and lorries in the whole of Australia. By 1929 there were 500,000. The stage coach company Cobb and Co, established in 1853, finally closed in 1924. In 1920, the Queensland and Northern Territory Aerial Service (to become the Australian airline Qantas) was established. The Reverend John Flynn, founded the Royal Flying Doctor Service, the world's first air ambulance in 1928. Daredevil pilot, Sir Charles Kingsford Smith pushed the new flying machines to the limit, completing a round Australia circuit in 1927 and in 1928 traversed the Pacific Ocean, via Hawaii and Fiji from the US to Australia in the aircraft Southern Cross. He went on to global fame and a series of aviation records before vanishing on a night flight to Singapore in 1935.

=== Dominion status ===
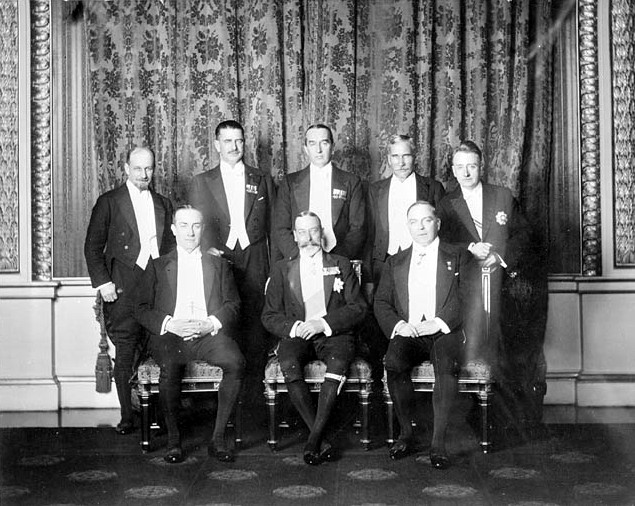
George V with his prime ministers. Standing (left to right): Monroe (Newfoundland), Coates (New Zealand), Bruce (Australia), Hertzog (Union of South Africa), Cosgrave (Irish Free State). Seated: Baldwin (UK), King George V, King (Canada).

Australia achieved independent Sovereign Nation status after World War I, under the Statute of Westminster. This formalised the Balfour Declaration of 1926, a report resulting from the 1926 Imperial Conference of British Empire leaders in London, which defined Dominions of the British empire in the following way: "They are autonomous Communities within the British Empire, equal in status, in no way subordinate one to another in any aspect of their domestic or external affairs, though united by a common allegiance to the Crown, and freely associated as members of the British Commonwealth of Nations."; however, Australia did not ratify the Statute of Westminster until 1942. (Note: It has also been argued that the signing of the Treaty of Versailles by Australia shows de facto recognition of sovereign nation status. See Sir Geoffrey Butler KBE, MA and Fellow, Librarian and Lecturer in International Law and Diplomacy of Corpus Christi College, Cambridge author of A Handbook to the League of Nations.) According to historian Frank Crowley, this was because Australians had little interest in redefining the relationship with Britain until the crisis of World War II.

The Australia Act 1986 removed any remaining links between the British Parliament and the Australian states.

From 1 February 1927 until 12 June 1931, the Northern Territory was divided up as North Australia and Central Australia at latitude 20°S. New South Wales has had one further territory surrendered, namely Jervis Bay Territory comprising 6,677 hectares, in 1915. The external territories were added: Norfolk Island (1914); Ashmore Island, Cartier Islands (1931); the Australian Antarctic Territory transferred from Britain (1933); Heard Island, McDonald Islands, and Macquarie Island transferred to Australia from Britain (1947).

The Federal Capital Territory (FCT) was formed from New South Wales in 1911 to provide a location for the proposed new federal capital of Canberra (Melbourne was the seat of government from 1901 to 1927). The FCT was renamed the Australian Capital Territory (ACT) in 1938. The Northern Territory was transferred from the control of the South Australian government to the Commonwealth in 1911.

=== Great Depression ===
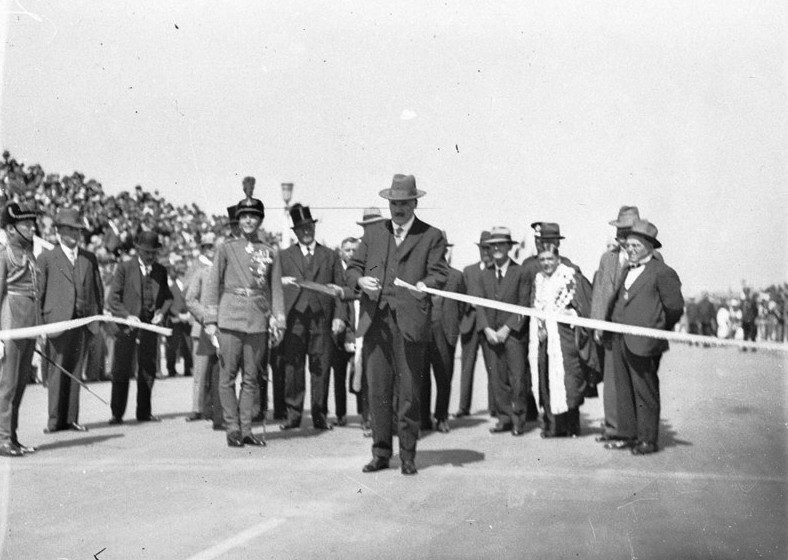
Ribbon ceremony to open the Sydney Harbour Bridge on 20 March 1932. Breaking protocol, the soon to be dismissed Premier Jack Lang cuts the ribbon while Governor Philip Game looks on.

Well before the Wall Street crash of 1929, the economy was facing high overseas debt and a slowdown. As the economy slowed in 1927, so did manufacturing and the country slipped into recession as profits slumped and unemployment rose. Australia was deeply affected by the global Great Depression of the 1930s, particularly due to its heavy dependence on exports of wool and wheat, and on borrowing from London. The world prices of wool and wheat halved, and lending ended.

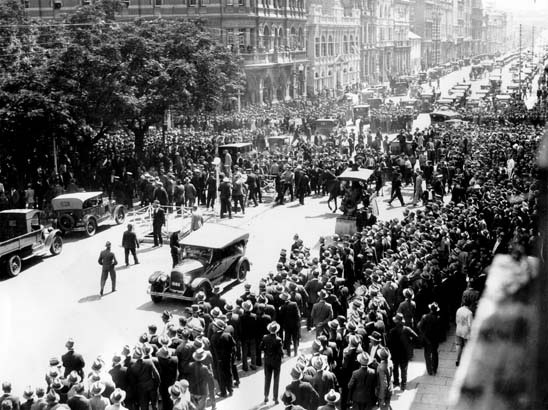
In 1931, more than 1,000 unemployed men marched from the Esplanade to the Treasury Building in Perth, Western Australia, to see Premier Sir James Mitchell.

At elections held in October 1929, the Labor Party was swept into power in a landslide victory; Stanley Bruce, the former prime minister, lost his own seat. The new prime minister, James Scullin, and his largely inexperienced government were immediately faced with a series of crises. Hamstrung by their lack of control of the Senate, a lack of control of the banking system and divisions within their party about how best to deal with the situation, the government was forced to accept solutions that eventually split the party. Some gravitated to New South Wales Premier Lang, others to Prime Minister Scullin.

Various plans to resolve the crisis were suggested; Sir Otto Niemeyer, a representative of the English banks who visited in mid-1930, proposed a deflationary plan, involving cuts to government spending and wages. Treasurer Ted Theodore proposed a mildly inflationary plan, while the Labor Premier of New South Wales, Jack Lang, proposed a radical plan which repudiated overseas debt. The "Premier's Plan" finally accepted by federal and state governments in June 1931, followed the deflationary model advocated by Niemeyer and included a reduction of 20 per cent in government spending, a reduction in bank interest rates and an increase in taxation. In March 1931, Lang announced that interest due in London would not be paid and the Federal government stepped in to meet the debt. In May, the Government Savings Bank of New South Wales was forced to close. The Melbourne Premiers' Conference agreed to cut wages and pensions as part of a severe deflationary policy but Lang renounced the plan. The excitement over the opening of the Sydney Harbour Bridge in 1932 provided little respite to the growing crisis straining the nation. With multimillion-pound debts mounting, public demonstrations and move and counter-move by Lang and then Scullin, then Lyons federal governments, the governor of New South Wales, Philip Game, had been examining Lang's instruction not to pay money into the Federal Treasury. Game judged it was illegal. Lang refused to withdraw his order and, on 13 May, he was dismissed by Governor Game. At June elections, Lang Labor's seats collapsed.

May 1931 saw the creation of a new conservative political force, the United Australia Party formed by breakaway members of the Labor Party combining with the Nationalist Party. At Federal elections in December 1931, the United Australia Party, led by former Labor member Joseph Lyons, easily won office. They remained in power until September 1940. The Lyons government has often been credited with steering recovery from the depression, although just how much of this success was owed to their policies remains contentious. Stuart Macintyre points out that although Australian GDP grew from £387 million to £486 million between 1931 and 1932 and 1938–39, real domestic product per head of population was still "but a few shillings greater in 1938–39 (£70.12), than it had been in 1920–21 (£70.04)."

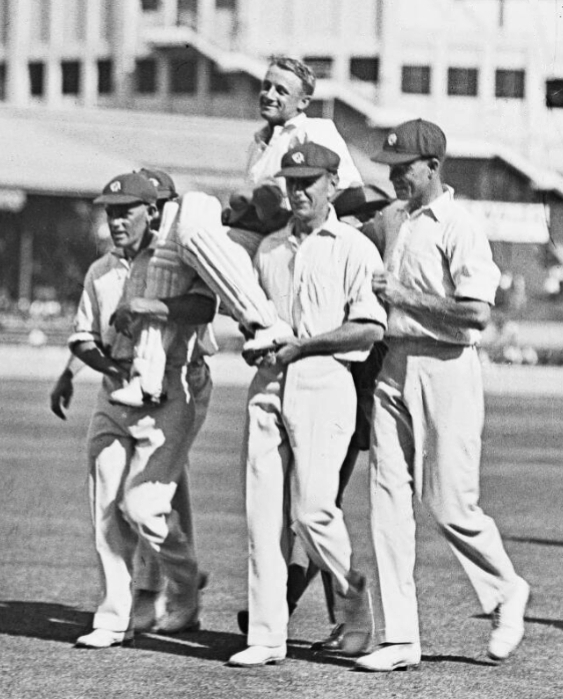
21-year-old Don Bradman is chaired off the cricket pitch after scoring a world record 452 runs not out in 1930. Sporting success lifted Australian spirits through the Depression years.

Australia recovered relatively quickly from the financial downturn of 1929–1930, with recovery beginning around 1932. The prime minister, Joseph Lyons, favoured the tough economic measures of the Premiers' Plan, pursued an orthodox fiscal policy and refused to accept the proposals of the premier of New South Wales, Jack Lang, to default on overseas debt repayments. According to author Anne Henderson of the Sydney Institute, Lyons held a steadfast belief in "the need to balance budgets, lower costs to business and restore confidence" and the Lyons period gave Australia "stability and eventual growth" between the drama of the Depression and the outbreak of the Second World War. A lowering of wages was enforced and industry tariff protections maintained, which together with cheaper raw materials during the 1930s saw a shift from agriculture to manufacturing as the chief employer of the Australian economy—a shift which was consolidated by increased investment by the commonwealth government into defence and armaments manufacture. Lyons argued that restoration of Australia's exports was the key to economic recovery.

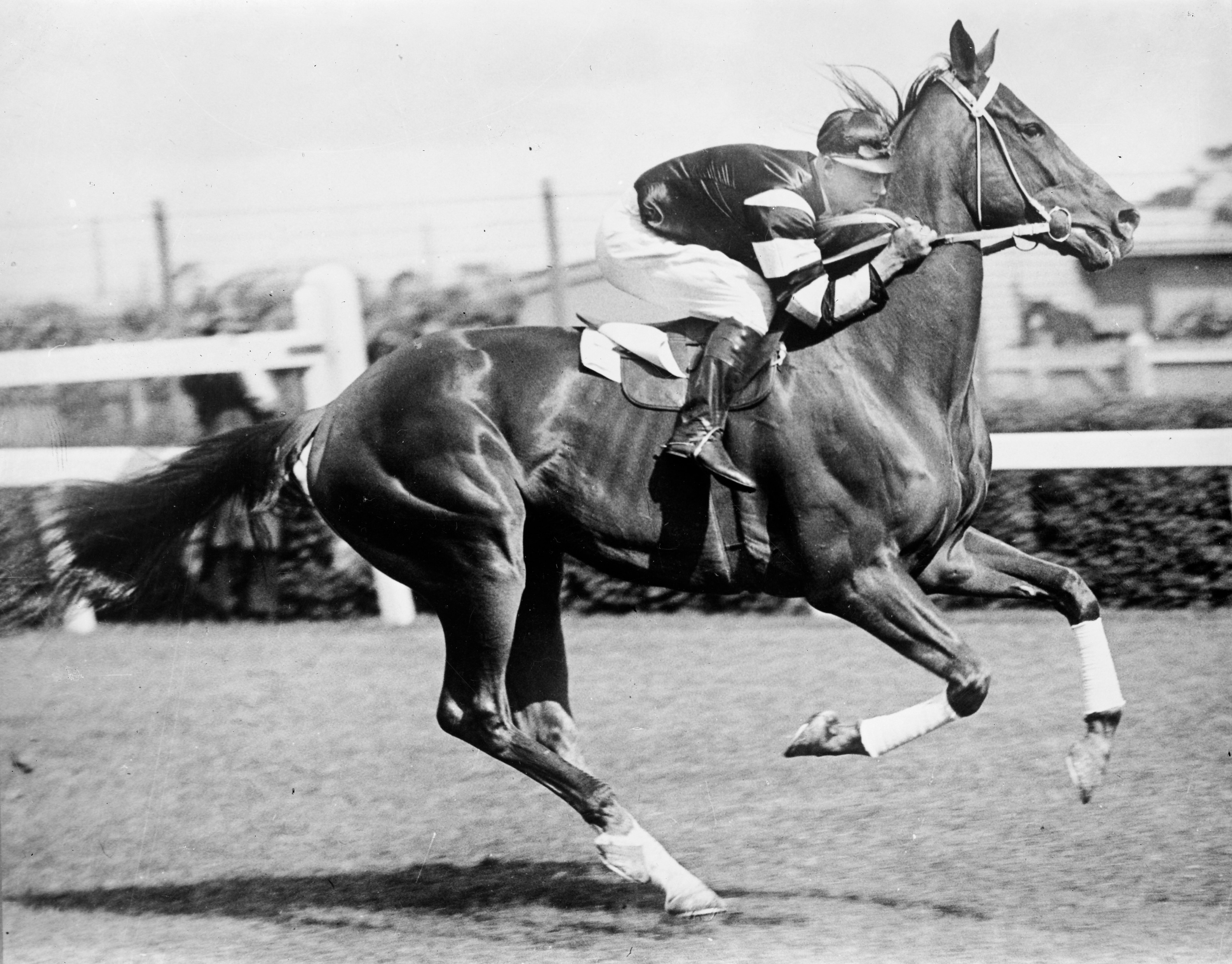
Phar Lap, c. 1930

The extent of unemployment in Australia, often cited as peaking at 29 per cent in 1932 is debated. "Trade union figures are the most often quoted, but the people who were there...regard the figures as wildly understating the extent of unemployment" wrote historian Wendy Lowenstein. However, David Potts argues that "over the last thirty years ...historians of the period have either uncritically accepted that figure (29% in the peak year 1932) including rounding it up to 'a third', or they have passionately argued that a third is far too low." Potts suggested a peak national figure of 25 per cent unemployed. Measurement is difficult in part because there was great variation, geographically, by age and by gender, in the level of unemployment. Statistics collected by historian Peter Spearritt show 17.8 per cent of men and 7.9 per cent of women unemployed in 1933 in the comfortable Sydney suburb of Woollahra. This is not to say that 81.9 per cent of women were working but that 7.9 per cent of the women interested/looking for work were unable to find it, a much lower figure than maybe first thought, as many women stayed home and were not in the job force in those years, especially if they were unable to find work.

In the working class suburb of Paddington, 41 per cent of men and 21 per cent of women were unemployed. Geoffrey Spenceley says unemployment was much higher in some industries, such as the building and construction industry, and comparatively low in the public administrative and professional sectors. In country areas, worst hit were small farmers in the wheat belts as far afield as north-east Victoria and Western Australia, who saw more and more of their income absorbed by interest payments.

Extraordinary sporting successes did something to alleviate the spirits of Australians during the economic downturn. In a Sheffield Shield cricket match at the Sydney Cricket Ground in 1930, Don Bradman, a young New South Welshman of just 21 years of age wrote his name into the record books by smashing the previous highest batting score in first-class cricket with 452 runs not out in just 415 minutes. The rising star's world beating cricketing exploits were to provide Australians with much needed joy through the emerging Great Depression in Australia and post-World War II recovery. Between 1929 and 1931 the racehorse Phar Lap dominated Australia's racing industry, at one stage winning fourteen races in a row. Famous victories included the 1930 Melbourne Cup, following an assassination attempt and carrying 9 stone 12 pounds weight. Phar Lap sailed for the United States in 1931, going on to win North America's richest race, the Agua Caliente Handicap in 1932. Soon after, on the cusp of US success, Phar Lap developed suspicious symptoms and died. Theories swirled that the champion race horse had been poisoned and a devoted Australian public went into shock. The 1938 British Empire Games were held in Sydney from 5–12 February, timed to coincide with Sydney's sesqui-centenary (150 years since the foundation of British settlement in Australia).

=== Indigenous policy ===
Following federation Aboriginal affairs was a state responsibility, although the Commonwealth became responsible for the Aboriginal population of the Northern Territory from 1911. By that date the Commonwealth and all states except Tasmania had passed legislation establishing Protectors of Aborigines and Protection Boards with extensive powers to regulate the lives of Aboriginal Australians including their ownership of property, place of residence, employment, sexual relationships and custody of their children. Reserves were established, ostensibly for the protection of the Aboriginal population who had been dispossessed of their land. Church groups also ran missions throughout Australia providing shelter, food, religious instruction and elementary schooling for Indigenous people.

Some officials were concerned by the growing number of Aboriginal children of mixed heritage, particularly in northern Australia where large Indigenous, South Sea Islander and Asian populations were seen as inconsistent with the white Australia policy. Laws concerning Aboriginal Australians were progressively tightened to make it easier for officials to remove Aboriginal children of mixed descent from their parents and place them in reserves, missions, institutions and employment with white employers.

The segregation of Aboriginal people on reserves and in institutions was never systematically accomplished due to funding constraints, differing policy priorities in the states and territories, and resistance from Aboriginal people. In the more densely settled areas of Australia, about 20 per cent of Aboriginal people lived on reserves in the 1920s. The majority lived in camps on the fringes of country towns and a small percentage lived in cities. During the Great Depression more Aboriginal people moved to reserves and missions for food and shelter. By 1941 almost half of the Aboriginal population of New South Wales lived on reserves.

In northern Australia, the majority of employed Aboriginal people worked in the pastoral industry where they lived in camps, often with their extended families. Many also camped on the margins of towns and reserves where they could avoid most of the controls imposed by the administrators of reserves, compounds and missions.

The 1937 Native Welfare conference of state and Commonwealth officials endorsed a policy of biological absorption of mixed-descent Aboriginal Australians into the white community.

[T]he destiny of the natives of aboriginal origin, but not of the full blood, lies in their ultimate absorption by the people of the Commonwealth and it therefore recommends that all efforts be directed to that end.

The officials saw the policy of Aboriginal assimilation by absorption into the white community as progressive, aimed at eventually achieving civil and economic equality for mixed-descent Aboriginal people.

... efforts of all State authorities should be directed towards the education of children of mixed aboriginal blood at white standards, and their subsequent employment under the same conditions as whites with a view to their taking their place in the white community on an equal footing with the whites.

The following decades saw an increase in the number of Aboriginal Australians of mixed descent removed from their families, although the states and territories progressively adopted a policy of cultural, rather than biological, assimilation, and justified removals on the grounds of child welfare. In 1940, New South Wales became the first state to introduce a child welfare model whereby Aboriginal children of mixed descent were removed from their families under general welfare provisions by court order. Other jurisdictions introduced a welfare model after the war.

== World War II ==
=== Defence policy in the 1930s ===
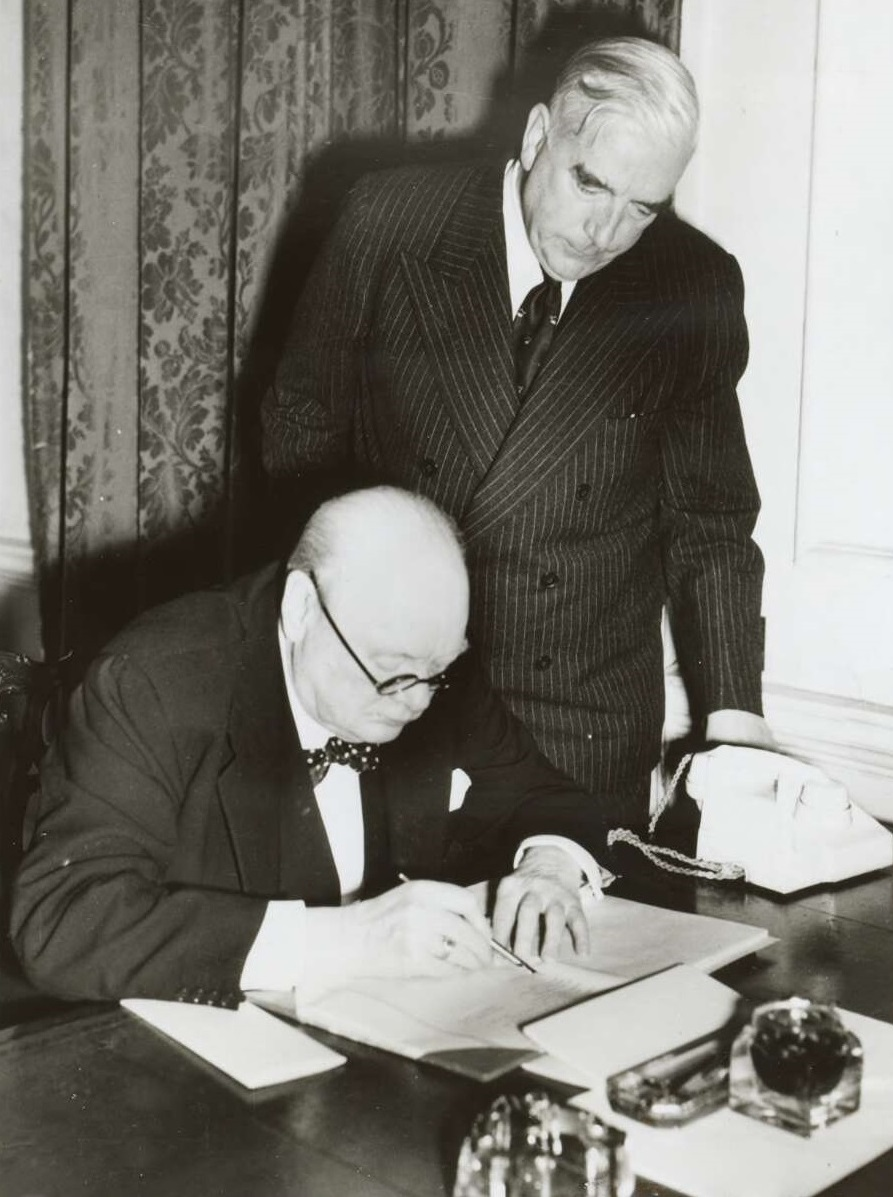
Prime Minister Robert Menzies and British prime minister Winston Churchill in 1941

Until the late 1930s, defence was not a significant issue for Australians. At the 1937 elections, both political parties advocated increased defence spending, in the context of increased Japanese aggression in China and Germany's aggression in Europe; however, there was a difference in opinion about how the defence spending should be allocated. The United Australia Party government emphasised co-operation with Britain in "a policy of imperial defence". The lynchpin of this was the British naval base at Singapore and the Royal Navy battle fleet "which, it was hoped, would use it in time of need". Defence spending in the inter-war years reflected this priority. In the period 1921–1936 totalled £40 million on the Royal Australian Navy, £20 million on the Australian Army and £6 million on the Royal Australian Air Force (established in 1921, the "youngest" of the three services). In 1939, the Navy, which included two heavy cruisers and four light cruisers, was the service best equipped for war.

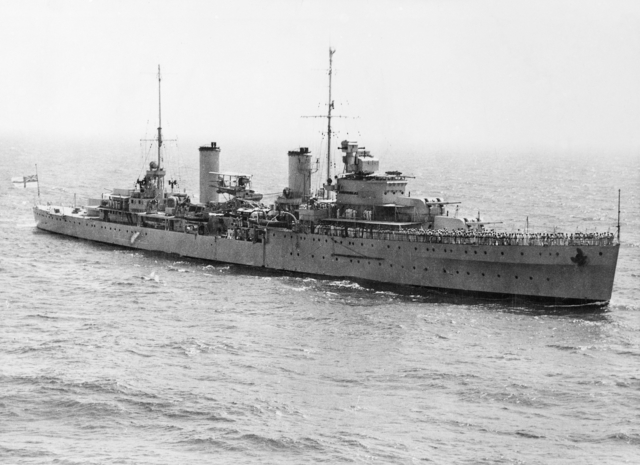
The light cruiser HMAS Sydney, lost in a battle in the Indian Ocean, November 1941

Fearing Japanese intentions in the Pacific, Menzies established independent embassies in Tokyo and Washington to receive independent advice about developments. Gavin Long argues that the Labor opposition urged greater national self-reliance through a build-up of manufacturing and more emphasis on the Army and RAAF, as Chief of the General Staff, John Lavarack also advocated. In November 1936, Labor leader John Curtin said "The dependence of Australia upon the competence, let alone the readiness, of British statesmen to send forces to our aid is too dangerous a hazard upon which to found Australia's defence policy." According to John Robertson, "some British leaders had also realised that their country could not fight Japan and Germany at the same time." But "this was never discussed candidly at...meeting(s) of Australian and British defence planners", such as the 1937 Imperial Conference.

By September 1939 the Australian Army numbered 3,000 regulars. A recruiting campaign in late 1938, led by Major-General Thomas Blamey increased the reserve militia to almost 80,000. The first division raised for war was designated the 6th Division, of the 2nd AIF, there being 5 Militia Divisions on paper and a 1st AIF in the First World War.

=== War ===
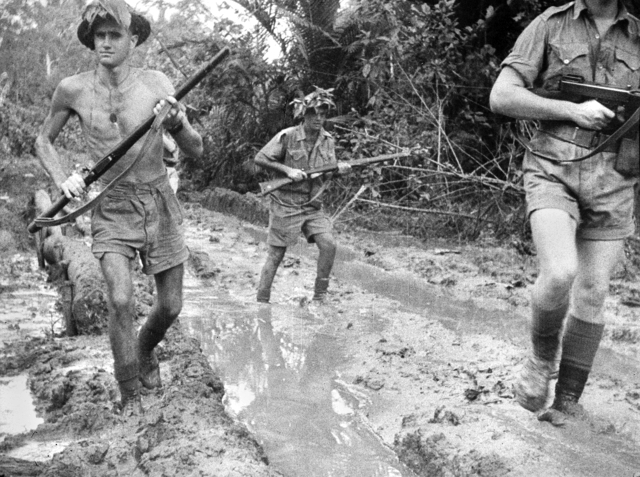
Australian troops at Milne Bay, Papua. The Australian army was the first to inflict defeat on the Imperial Japanese Army during World War II at the Battle of Milne Bay of August–September 1942.

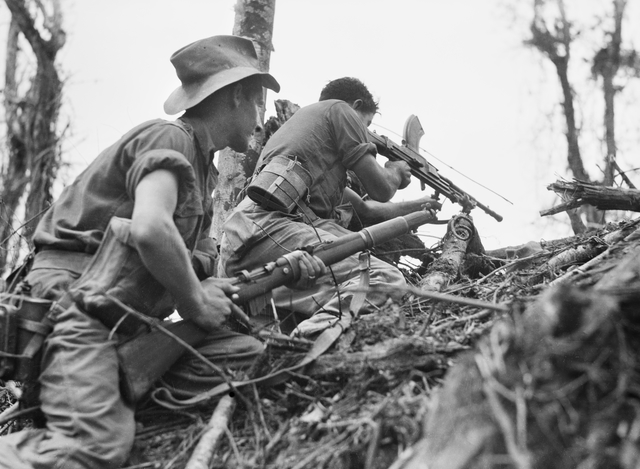
An Australian light machine gun team in action near Wewak, Papua New Guinea, in June 1945

On 3 September 1939, the prime minister, Robert Menzies, made a national radio broadcast: "My fellow Australians. It is my melancholy duty to inform you, officially, that, in consequence of the persistence by Germany in her invasion of Poland, Great Britain has declared war upon her, and that, as a result, Australia is also at war."

Thus began Australia's involvement in the six-year global conflict. Australians were to fight in an extraordinary variety of locations, including withstanding the advance of German Panzers in the Siege of Tobruk, turning back the advance of the Imperial Japanese Army in the New Guinea Campaign, undertaking bomber missions over Europe, engaging in naval battles in the Mediterranean. At home, Japanese attacks included mini-submarine raids on Sydney Harbour and very heavy air raids on and near the Northern Territory's capital, Darwin.

The recruitment of a volunteer military force for service at home and abroad was announced, the 2nd Australian Imperial Force and a citizen militia organised for local defence. Troubled by Britain's failure to increase defences at Singapore, Menzies was cautious in committing troops to Europe. By the end of June 1940, France, Norway, Denmark and the Low Countries had fallen to Nazi Germany. Britain stood alone with its dominions. Menzies called for "all-out war", increasing federal powers and introducing conscription. Menzies' minority government came to rely on just two independents after the 1940 election.

In January 1941, Menzies flew to Britain to discuss the weakness of Singapore's defences. Arriving in London during The Blitz, Menzies was invited into Winston Churchill's British War Cabinet for the duration of his visit. Returning to Australia, with the threat of Japan imminent and with the Australian army suffering badly in the Greek and Crete campaigns, Menzies re-approached the Labor Party to form a War Cabinet. Unable to secure their support, and with an unworkable parliamentary majority, Menzies resigned as prime minister. The coalition held office for another month, before the independents switched allegiance and John Curtin was sworn in as prime minister. Eight weeks later, Japan attacked Pearl Harbor.

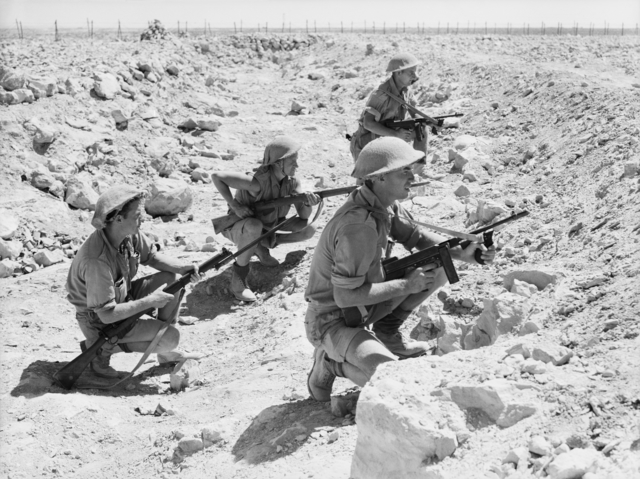
A patrol from the 2/13th Infantry Battalion at Tobruk in North Africa, (AWM 020779). The 1941 Siege of Tobruk saw an Australian garrison halt the advance of Hitler's Panzer divisions for the first time since the commencement of the war.

From 1940 to 1941, Australian forces played prominent roles in the fighting in the Mediterranean theatre, including Operation Compass, the Siege of Tobruk, the Greek campaign, the Battle of Crete, the Syria–Lebanon Campaign and the Second Battle of El Alamein.

A garrison of around 14,000 Australian soldiers, commanded by Lieutenant General Leslie Morshead was besieged in Tobruk, Libya, by the German-Italian army of General Erwin Rommel between April and August 1941. The Nazi propagandist Lord Haw Haw derided the defenders as 'rats', a term the soldiers adopted as an ironic compliment: "The Rats of Tobruk". Vital in the defence of Egypt and the Suez Canal, the siege saw the advance of the German army halted for the first time and provided a morale boost for the British Commonwealth, which was then standing alone against Hitler.

The war came closer to home when HMAS Sydney was lost with all hands in battle with the German raider Kormoran in November 1941.

With most of Australia's best forces committed to fight against Hitler in the Middle East, Japan attacked Pearl Harbor, the US naval base in Hawaii, on 8 December 1941 (eastern Australia time). The British battleship HMS Prince of Wales and battlecruiser HMS Repulse sent to defend Singapore were sunk soon afterwards. Australia was ill-prepared for an attack, lacking armaments, modern fighter aircraft, heavy bombers, and aircraft carriers. While demanding reinforcements from Churchill, on 27 December 1941 Curtin published an historic announcement: "The Australian Government... regards the Pacific struggle as primarily one in which the United States and Australia must have the fullest say in the direction of the democracies' fighting plan. Without inhibitions of any kind, I make it clear that Australia looks to America, free of any pangs as to our traditional links or kinship with the United Kingdom."

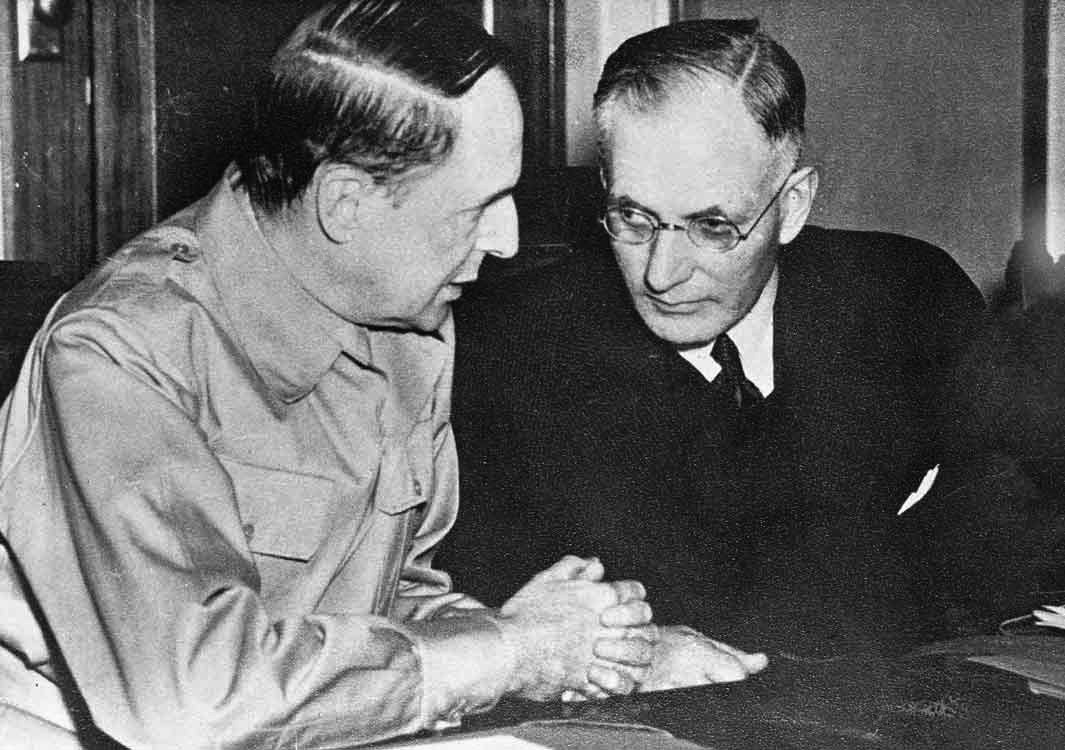
US General Douglas MacArthur, Commander of Allied forces in the Pacific, with Prime Minister John Curtin

British Malaya quickly collapsed, shocking the Australian nation. British, Indian and Australian troops made a disorganised last stand at Singapore, before surrendering on 15 February 1942. Around 15,000 Australian soldiers became prisoners of war. Curtin predicted that the "battle for Australia" would now follow. On 19 February, Darwin suffered a devastating air raid, the first time the Australian mainland had ever been attacked by enemy forces. For the following 19 months, Australia was attacked from the air almost 100 times.

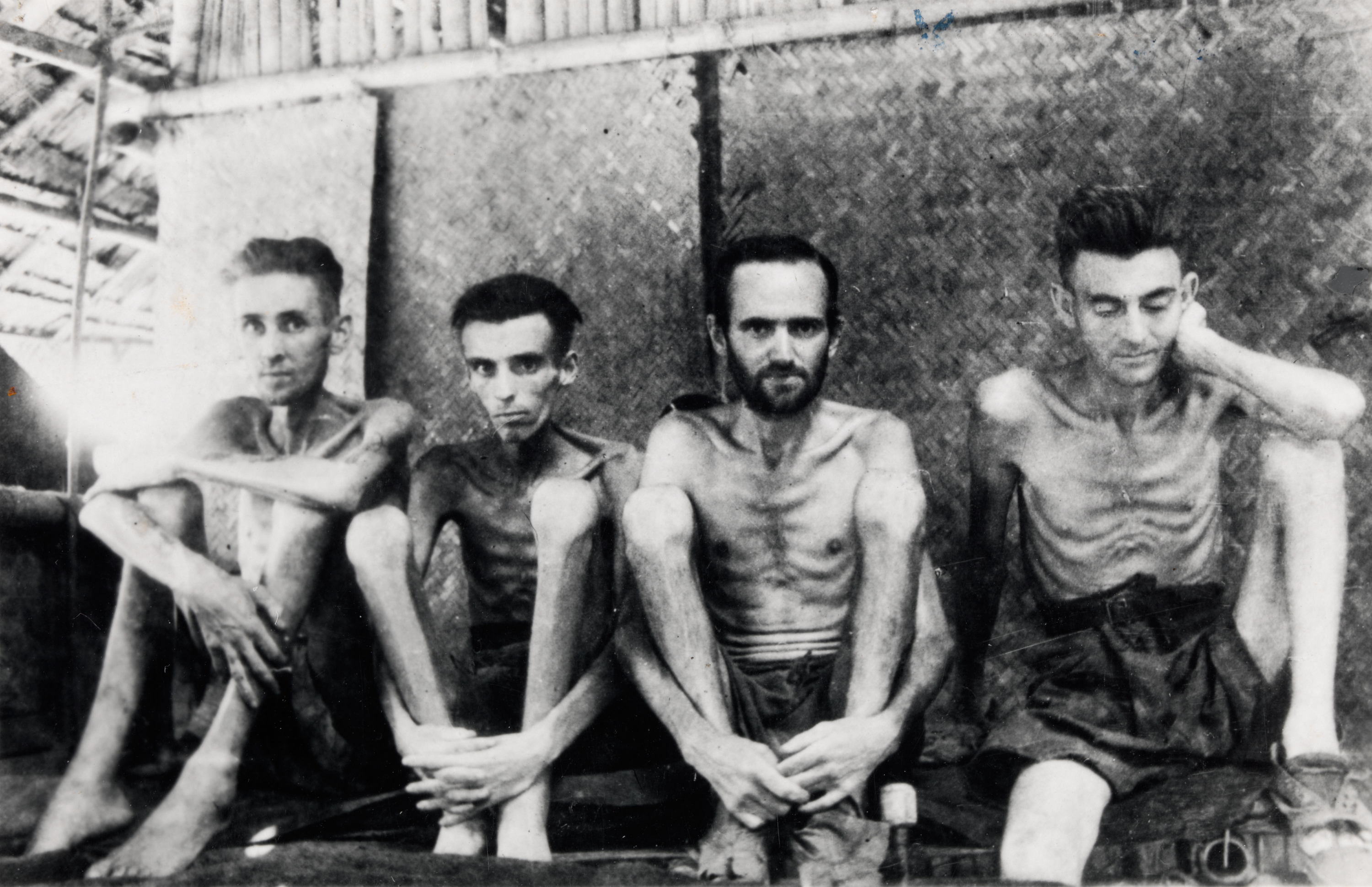
Dutch and Australian PoWs at Tarsau, in Thailand in 1943. 22,000 Australians were captured by the Japanese; 8,000 died as POWs.

Two battle-hardened Australian divisions were already steaming from the Middle East for Singapore. Churchill wanted them diverted to Burma, but Curtin refused, and anxiously awaited their return to Australia. US president Franklin D. Roosevelt ordered his commander in the Philippines, General Douglas MacArthur, to formulate a Pacific defence plan with Australia in March 1942. Curtin agreed to place Australian forces under the command of General MacArthur, who became "Supreme Commander of the South West Pacific". Curtin had thus presided over a fundamental shift in Australia's foreign policy. MacArthur moved his headquarters to Melbourne in March 1942 and American troops began massing in Australia. In late May 1942, Japanese midget submarines sank an accommodation vessel in a daring raid on Sydney Harbour. On 8 June 1942, two Japanese submarines briefly shelled Sydney's eastern suburbs and the city of Newcastle.

In an effort to isolate Australia, the Japanese planned a seaborne invasion of Port Moresby, in the Australian Territory of New Guinea. In May 1942, the US Navy engaged the Japanese in the Battle of the Coral Sea and halted the attack. The Battle of Midway in June effectively defeated the Japanese navy and the Japanese army launched a land assault on Moresby from the north. Between July and November 1942, Australian forces repulsed Japanese attempts on the city by way of the Kokoda Track, in the highlands of New Guinea. The Battle of Milne Bay in August 1942 was the first Allied defeat of Japanese land forces.

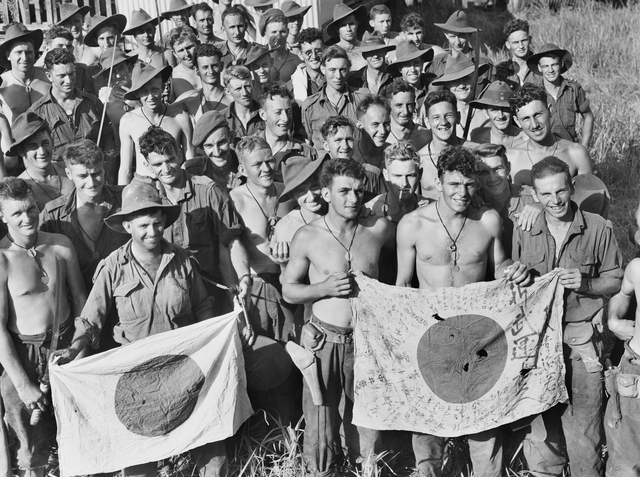
Australian soldiers display Japanese flags they captured at Kaiapit, New Guinea in 1943.

Meanwhile, in North Africa, the Axis powers had driven Allies back into Egypt. A turning point came between July and November 1942, when Australia's 9th Division played a crucial role in some of the heaviest fighting of the First and Second Battle of El Alamein, which turned the North Africa Campaign in favour of the Allies.

The Battle of Buna–Gona, between November 1942 and January 1943, set the tone for the bitter final stages of the New Guinea campaign, which persisted into 1945. The offensives in Papua and New Guinea of 1943–44 were the single largest series of connected operations ever mounted by the Australian armed forces. On 14 May 1943, the Australian Hospital Ship Centaur, though clearly marked as a medical vessel, was sunk by Japanese raiders off the Queensland coast, killing 268, including all but one of the nursing staff, further enraging popular opinion against Japan.

Australian prisoners of war were at this time suffering severe ill-treatment in the Pacific Theatre. In 1943, 2,815 Australian Pows died constructing Japan's Burma-Thailand Railway. In 1944, the Japanese inflicted the Sandakan Death March on 2,000 Australian and British prisoners of war—only 6 survived. This was the single worst war crime perpetrated against Australians in war.

MacArthur largely excluded Australian forces from the main push north into the Philippines and Japan. It was left to Australia to lead amphibious assaults against Japanese bases in Borneo. Curtin suffered from ill health from the strains of office and died weeks before the war ended, replaced by Ben Chifley.

Of Australia's wartime population of seven million, almost one million men and women served in a branch of the services during the six years of warfare. By war's end, gross enlistments totalled 727,200 men and women in the Australian Army (of whom 557,800 served overseas), 216,900 in the RAAF and 48,900 in the RAN. More than 39,700 were killed or died as prisoners of war, about 8,000 of whom died as prisoners of the Japanese.

=== Australian home front ===
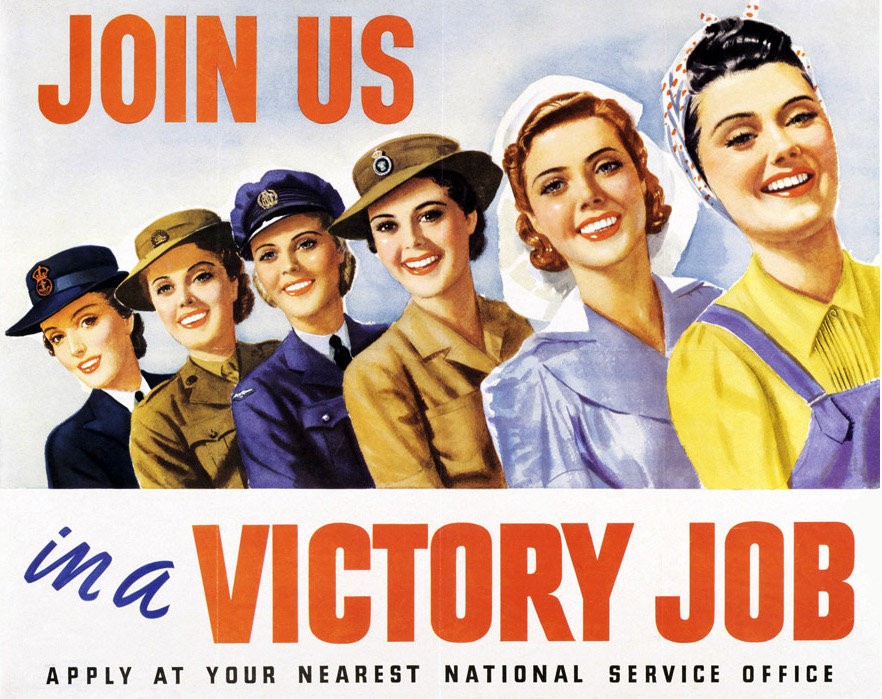
Australian women were encouraged to contribute to the war effort by joining one of the female branches of the armed forces or participating in the labour force.

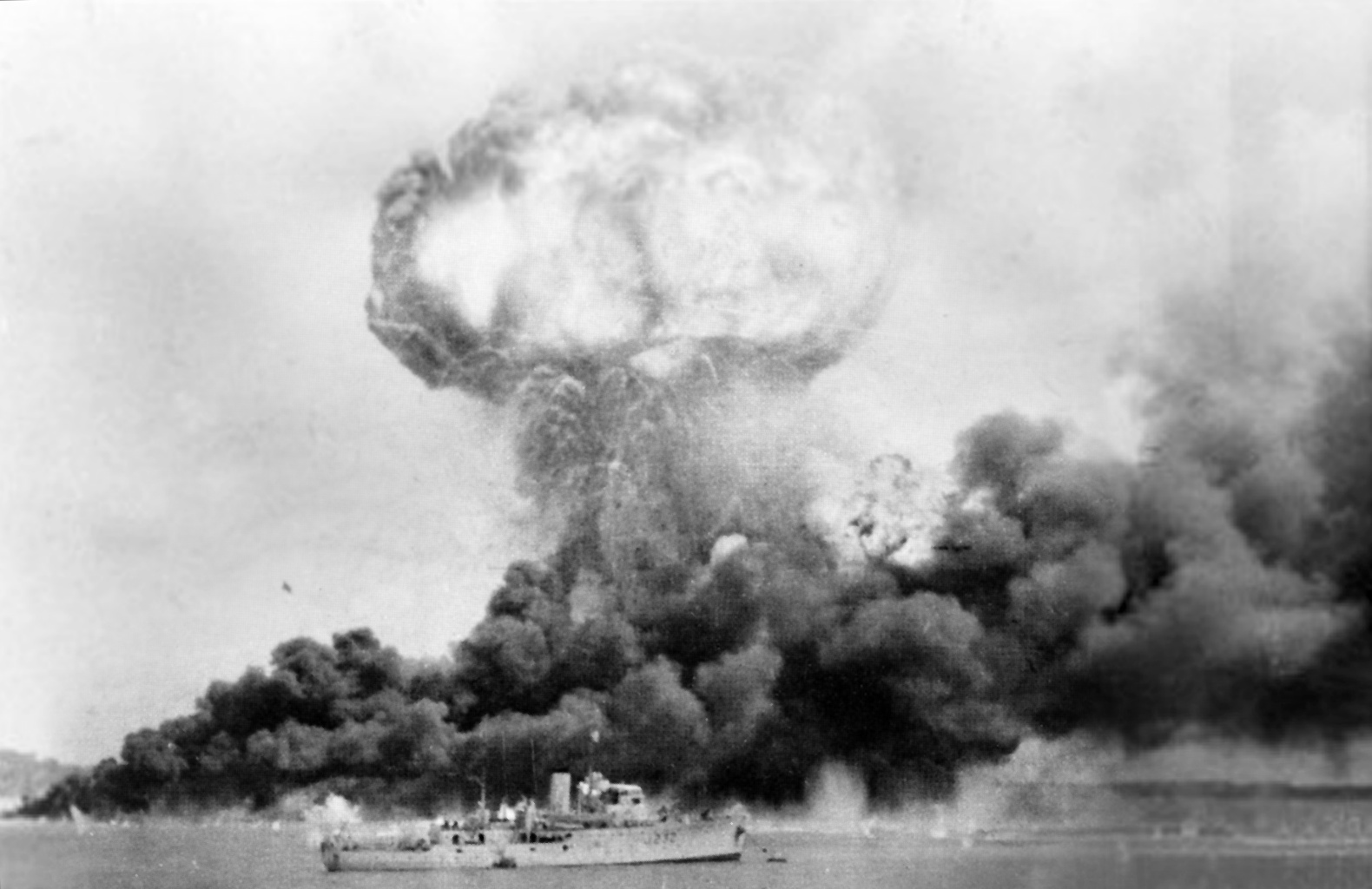
The Bombing of Darwin, 19 February 1942. Japanese air raids on Australia during 1942–43 killed hundreds of servicemen and civilians, while Axis naval activity in Australian waters threatened shipping between 1940 and 1945.

While the Australian civilian population suffered less at the hands of the Axis powers than did other Allied nations in Asia and Europe, Australia nevertheless came under direct attack by Japanese naval forces and aerial bombardments, particularly through 1942 and 1943, resulting in hundreds of fatalities and fuelling fear of Japanese invasion. Axis naval activity in Australian waters also brought the war close to home for Australians. Austerity measures, rationing and labour controls measures were all implemented to assist the war effort. Australian civilians dug air raid shelters, trained in civil defence and first aid, and Australian ports and cities were equipped with anti-aircraft and sea defences.

The Australian economy was markedly affected by World War II. Expenditure on war reached 37 per cent of GDP by 1943–44, compared to 4 per cent expenditure in 1939–1940. Total war expenditure was £2,949 million between 1939 and 1945.

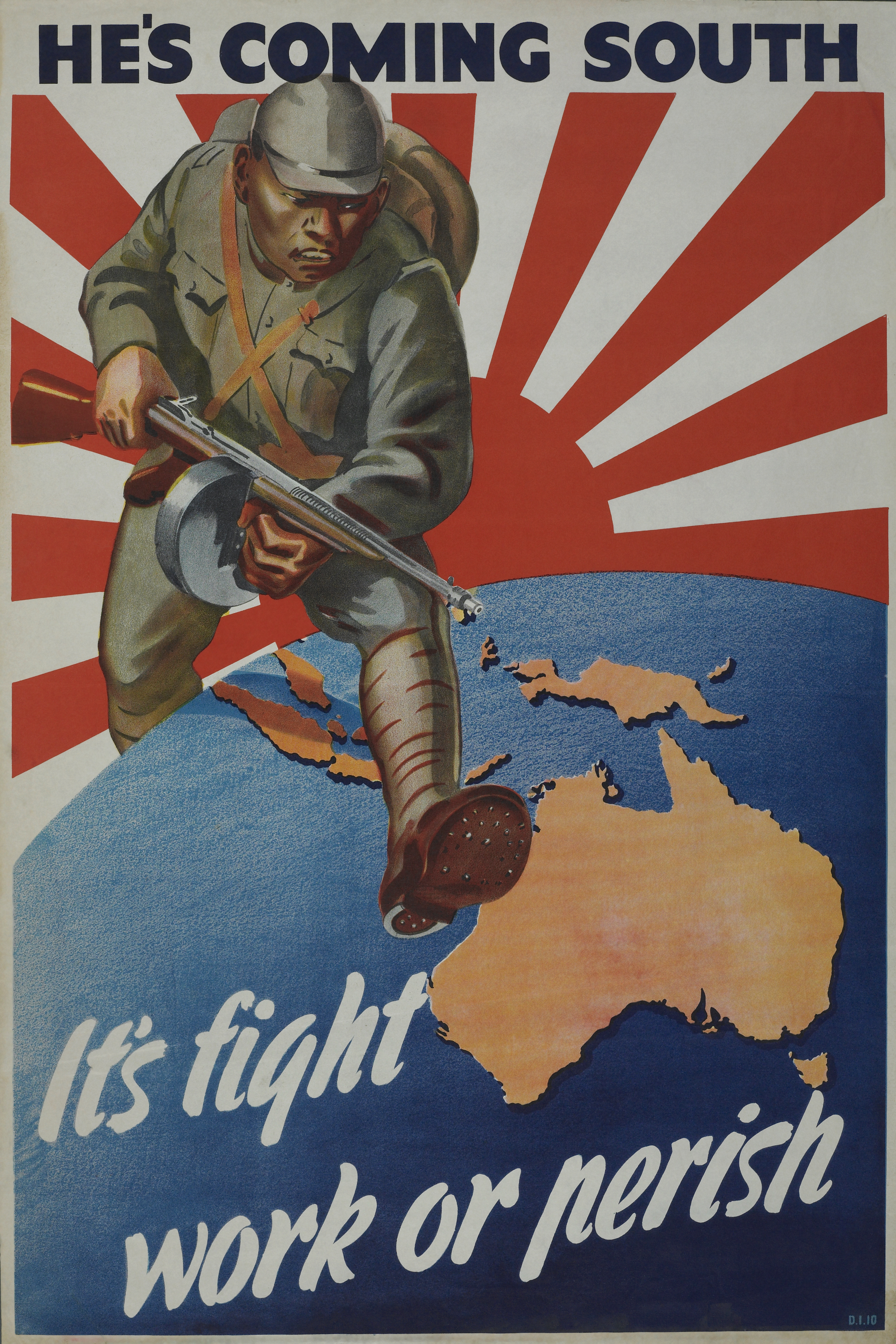
1942 Australian propaganda poster. Australia feared invasion by Imperial Japan following the invasion of the Australian Territory of New Guinea and Fall of Singapore in early 1942.

Although the peak of army enlistments occurred in June–July 1940, when more than 70,000 enlisted, it was the Curtin Labor government, formed in October 1941, that was largely responsible for "a complete revision of the whole Australian economic, domestic and industrial life". Rationing of fuel, clothing and some food was introduced (although less severely than in Britain), Christmas holidays curtailed, "brown outs" introduced and some public transport reduced. From December 1941, the Government evacuated all women and children from Darwin and northern Australia, and more than 10,000 refugees arrived from South East Asia as Japan advanced. In January 1942, the Manpower Directorate was set up "to ensure the organisation of Australians in the best possible way to meet all defence requirements." Minister for War Organisation of Industry, John Dedman introduced a degree of austerity and government control previously unknown, to such an extent that he was nicknamed "the man who killed Father Christmas".

In May 1942 uniform tax laws were introduced in Australia, ending state governments' control of income taxation. "The significance of this decision was greater than any other... made throughout the war, as it added extensive powers to the Federal Government and greatly reduced the financial autonomy of the states."

Manufacturing grew significantly because of the war. "In 1939, there were only three Australian firms producing machine tools, but by 1943 there were more than one hundred doing so." From having few front line aircraft in 1939, the RAAF had become the fourth largest allied Air force by 1945. A number of aircraft were built under licence in Australia before the war's end, notably the Beaufort and Beaufighter, although the majority of aircraft were from Britain and later, the US. The Boomerang fighter, designed and built in four months of 1942, emphasised the desperate state Australia found itself in as the Japanese advanced.

Australia also created, virtually from nothing, a significant female workforce engaged in direct war production. Between 1939 and 1944 the number of women working in factories rose from 171,000 to 286,000. Dame Enid Lyons, widow of former prime minister Joseph Lyons, became the first woman elected to the House of Representatives in 1943, joining the Robert Menzies' new centre-right Liberal Party of Australia, formed in 1945. At the same election, Dorothy Tangney became the first woman elected to the Senate.

== Post-war boom ==
=== Menzies and Liberal dominance (1949–72) ===
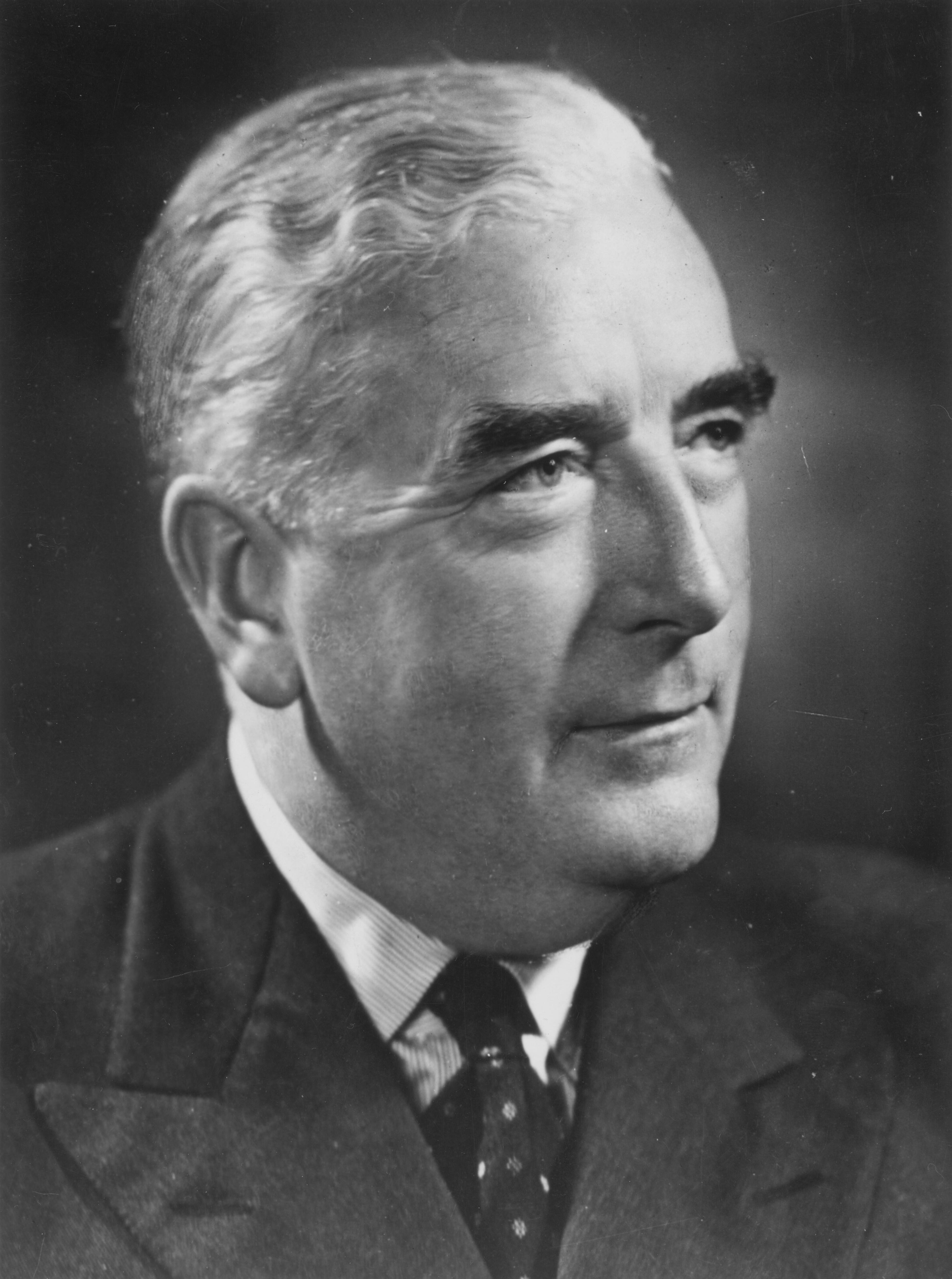
Sir Robert Menzies, founder of the Liberal Party of Australia and Prime Minister of Australia 1939–41 (UAP) and 1949–66

Politically, Robert Menzies and the Liberal Party of Australia dominated much of the immediate post war era, defeating the Labor government of Ben Chifley in 1949, in part because of a Labor proposal to nationalise banks and following a crippling coal strike led by the Australian Communist Party. Menzies became the country's longest-serving prime minister and the Liberal party, in coalition with the rural based Country Party, won every federal election until 1972.

As in the United States in the early 1950s, allegations of communist influence in society saw tensions emerge in politics. Refugees from Soviet dominated Eastern Europe immigrated to Australia, while to Australia's north, Mao Zedong's Chinese Communist Party won the Chinese Civil War in 1949 and in June 1950, Communist North Korea invaded South Korea. The Menzies government responded to a United States led United Nations Security Council request for military aid for South Korea and diverted forces from occupied Japan to begin Australia's involvement in the Korean War. After fighting to a bitter standstill, the UN and North Korea signed a ceasefire agreement in July 1953. Australian forces had participated in such major battles as Kapyong and Maryang San. 17,000 Australians had served and casualties amounted to more than 1,500, of whom 339 were killed.

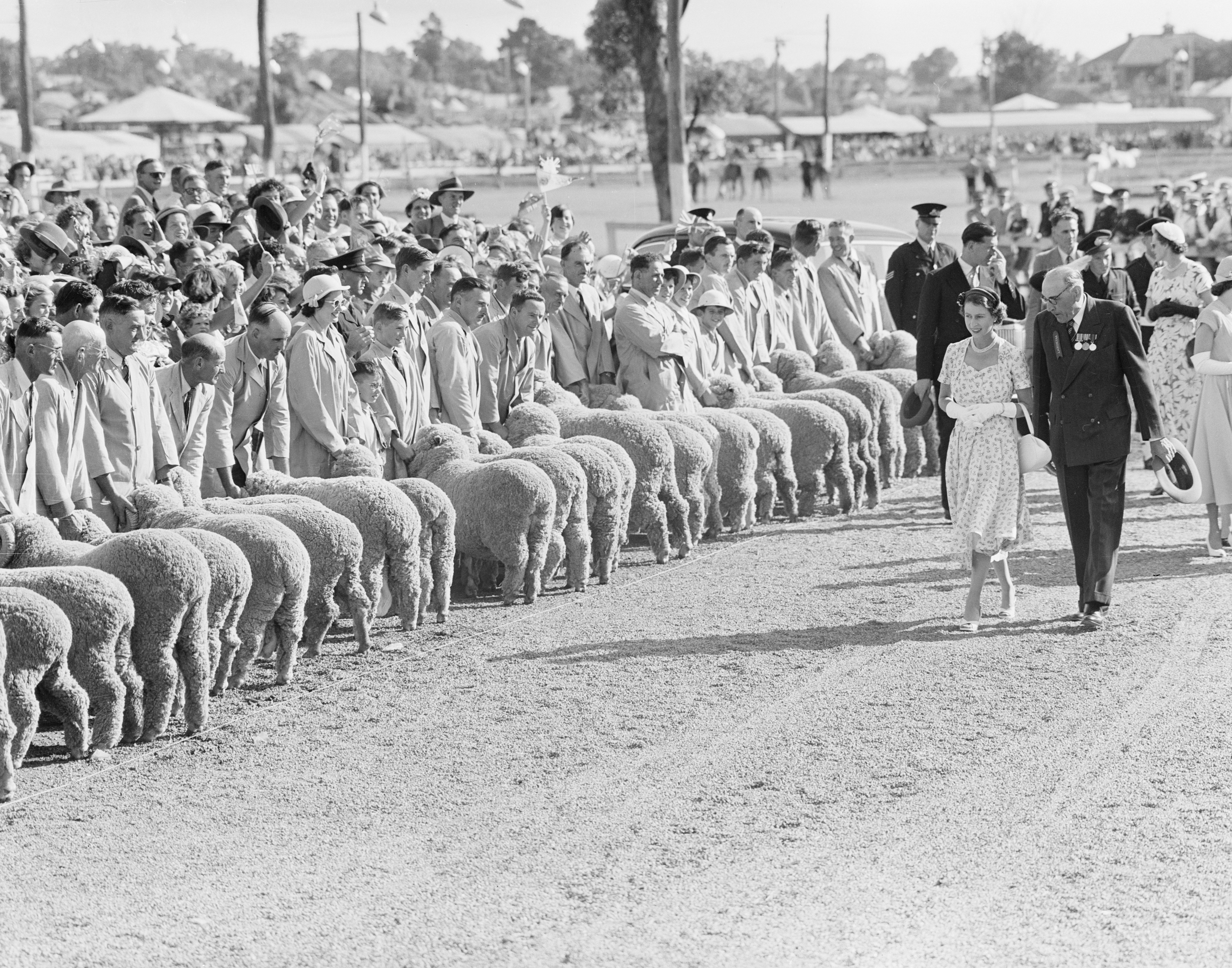
Queen Elizabeth II inspecting sheep at Wagga Wagga on her 1954 Royal Tour. Huge crowds greeted the Royal party across Australia.

During the course of the Korean War, the Liberal government attempted to ban the Communist Party of Australia, first by legislation in 1950 and later by referendum, in 1951. While both attempts were unsuccessful, further international events such as the defection of minor Soviet Embassy official Vladimir Petrov, added to a sense of impending threat that politically favoured Menzies' Liberal-CP government, as the Labor Party split over concerns about the influence of the Communist Party on the trade union movement. The tensions led to another bitter split and the emergence of the breakaway Democratic Labor Party (DLP). The DLP remained an influential political force, often holding the balance of power in the Senate, until 1974. Its preferences supported the Liberal and Country Party. The Labor party was led by H.V. Evatt after Chifley's death in 1951. Evatt had served as President of the United Nations General Assembly during 1948–49 and helped draft the United Nations Universal Declaration of Human Rights (1948). Evatt retired in 1960 amid signs of mental ill-health, and Arthur Calwell succeeded him as leader, with a young Gough Whitlam as his deputy.

Menzies presided during a period of sustained economic boom and the beginnings of sweeping social change, which included youth culture and its rock and roll music and, in the late 1950s, the arrival of television broadcasting. In 1958, Australian country music singer Slim Dusty, who would become the musical embodiment of rural Australia, had Australia's first international music chart hit with his bush ballad "Pub With No Beer", while rock and roller Johnny O'Keefe's "Wild One" became the first local recording to reach the national charts, peaking at No. 20. Australian cinema produced little of its own content in the 1950s, but British and Hollywood studios produced a string of successful epics from Australian literature, featuring home grown stars Chips Rafferty and Peter Finch.

Menzies remained a staunch supporter of links to the monarchy and Commonwealth of Nations and formalised an alliance with the United States, but also launched post-war trade with Japan, beginning a growth of Australian exports of coal, iron ore and mineral resources that would steadily climb until Japan became Australia's largest trading partner.

When Menzies retired in 1965, he was replaced as Liberal leader and prime minister by Harold Holt. Holt drowned while swimming at a surf beach in December 1967 and was replaced by John Gorton (1968–1971) and then by William McMahon (1971–1972).

=== Post-war immigration ===
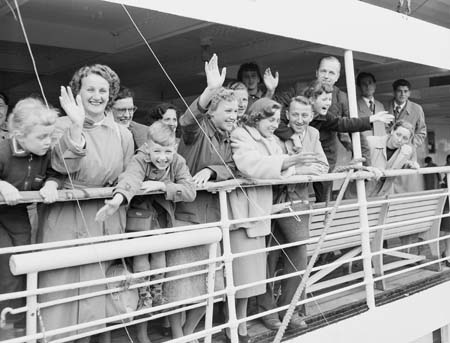
Postwar migrants arriving in Australia in 1954

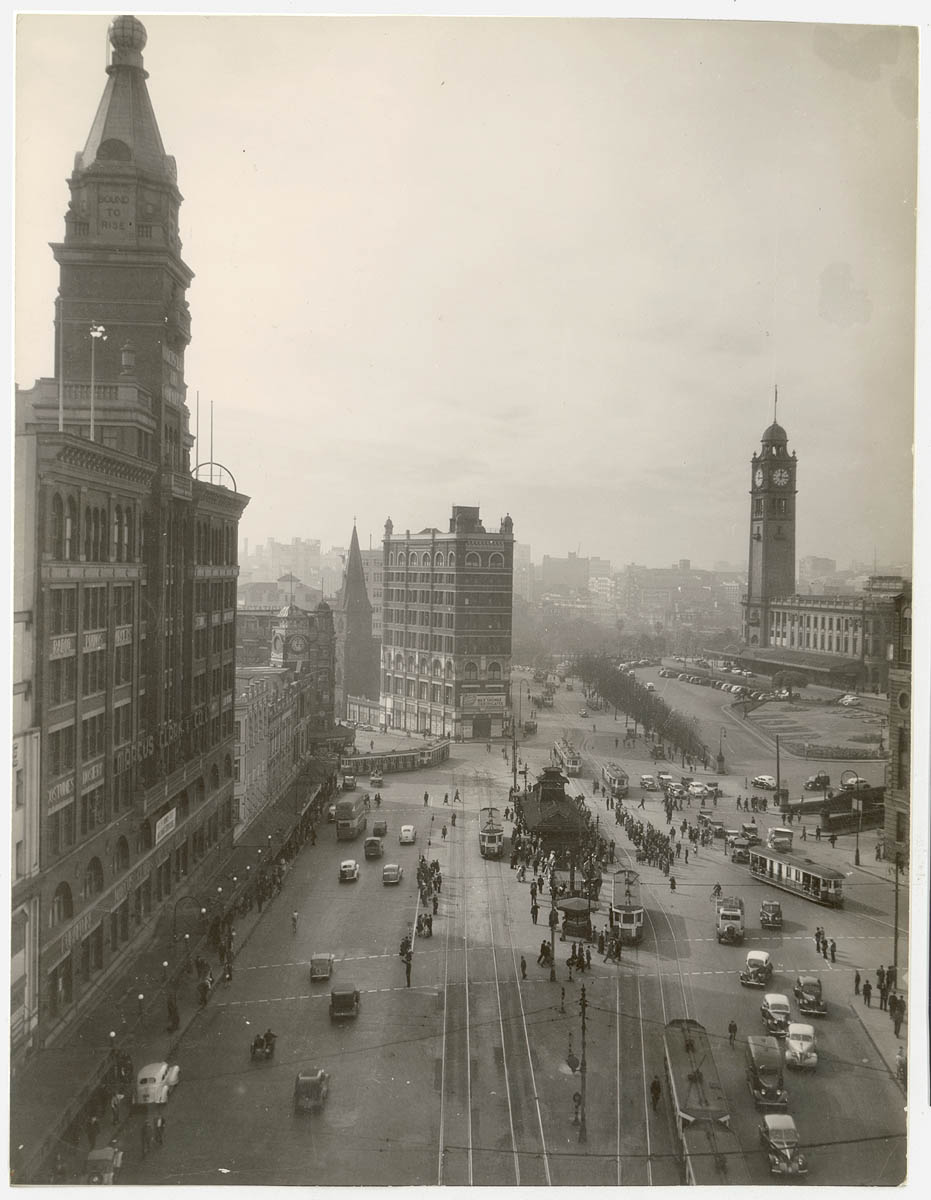
After World War II and by the 1950s, Australia had a population of 10 million, and the most populous urban centre was its oldest city, Sydney. It has retained its status as Australia's largest city ever since.

Following World War II, the Chifley Labor government instigated a massive programme of European immigration. In 1945, Minister for Immigration, Arthur Calwell wrote "If the experience of the Pacific War has taught us one thing, it surely is that seven million Australians cannot hold three million square miles of this earth's surface indefinitely." All political parties shared the view that the country must "populate or perish". Calwell stated a preference for ten British immigrants for each one from other countries; however, the numbers of British migrants fell short of what was expected, despite government assistance.

Migration brought large numbers of southern and central Europeans to Australia for the first time. A 1958 government leaflet assured readers that unskilled non-British migrants were needed for "labour on rugged projects ... work which is not generally acceptable to Australians or British workers". The Australian economy stood in sharp contrast to war-ravaged Europe, and newly arrived migrants found employment in a booming manufacturing industry and government assisted programmes such as the Snowy Mountains Scheme. This hydroelectricity and irrigation complex in south-east Australia consisted of sixteen major dams and seven power stations constructed between 1949 and 1974. It remains the largest engineering project undertaken in Australia. Necessitating the employment of 100,000 people from more than 30 countries, to many it denoted the birth of multicultural Australia. Some 4.2 million immigrants arrived between 1945 and 1985, about 40 per cent of whom came from Britain and Ireland. The 1957 novel They're a Weird Mob was a popular account of an Italian migrating to Australia, although written by Australian-born author John O'Grady. The Australian population reached 10 million in 1959–with Sydney its most populous city.

In May 1958, the Menzies Government passed the Migration Act 1958 which replaced the Immigration Restriction Act's arbitrarily applied dictation test with an entry permit system, that reflected economic and skills criteria. Further changes in the 1960s effectively ended the White Australia policy. It legally ended in 1973.

=== Economic growth and suburban living ===
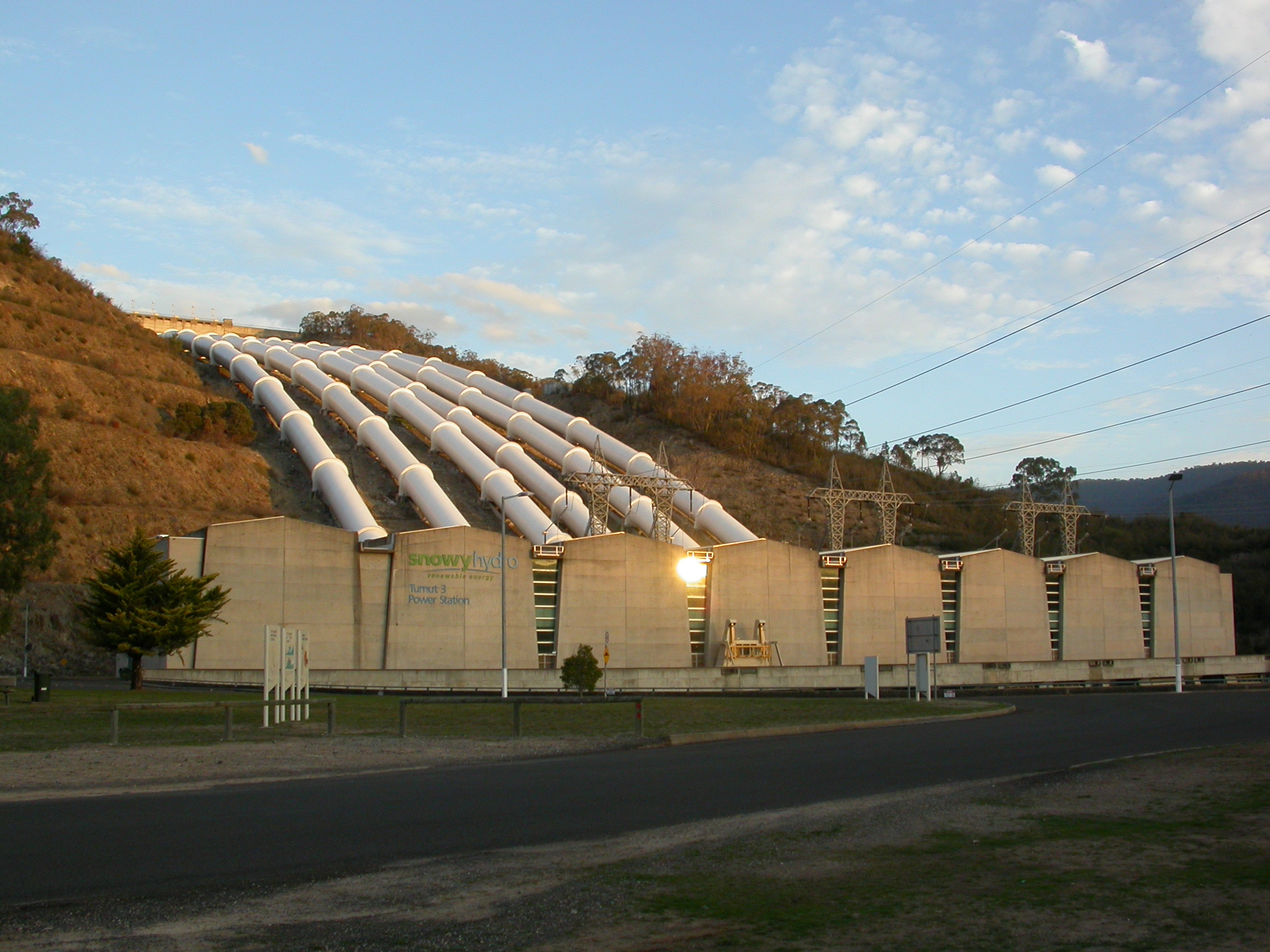
Tumut 3 power station was constructed as part of the vast Snowy Mountains Hydro Electric Scheme (1949–1974). Construction necessitated the expansion of Australia's immigration programme.

Australia enjoyed significant growth in prosperity in the 1950s and 1960s, with increases in both living standards and in leisure time. The manufacturing industry, previously playing a minor part in an economy dominated by primary production, greatly expanded. The first Holden motor car came out of General Motors-Holden's Fisherman's Bend factory in November 1948. Car ownership rapidly increased—from 130 owners in every 1,000 in 1949 to 271 owners in every 1,000 by 1961. By the early 1960s, four competitors to Holden had set up Australian factories, employing between 80,000 and 100,000 workers, "at least four-fifths of them migrants".

In the 1960s, about 60 per cent of Australian manufacturing was protected by tariffs. Pressure from business interests and the union movement ensured these remained high. Historian Geoffrey Bolton suggests that this high tariff protection of the 1960s caused some industries to "lapse into lethargy", neglecting research and development and the search for new markets. The CSIRO was expected to fulfil research and development.

Prices for wool and wheat remained high, with wool the mainstay of Australia's exports. Sheep numbers grew from 113 million in 1950 to 171 million in 1965. Wool production increased from 518,000 to 819,000 tonnes in the same period. Wheat, wool and minerals ensured a healthy balance of trade between 1950 and 1966.

The great housing boom of the post war period saw rapid growth in the suburbs of the major Australian cities. By the 1966 census, only 14 per cent lived in rural Australia, down from 31 per cent in 1933, and only 8 per cent lived on farms. Virtual full employment meant high standards of living and dramatic increases in home ownership, and by the sixties, Australia had the most equitable spread of income in the world. By the beginning of the sixties, an Australia-wide McNair survey estimated that 94% of homes had a fridge, 50% a telephone, 55% a television, 60% a washing machine, and 73% a vacuum cleaner. In addition, most households had now acquired a car. According to one study, "In 1946, there was one car for every 14 Australians; by 1960, it was one to 3.5. The vast majority of families had access to a car."

Car ownership flourished during the postwar period, with 1970/1971 census data estimating that 96.4 per cent of Australian households in the early Seventies owned at least one car; however, not all felt the rapid suburban growth was desirable. Distinguished Architect and designer Robin Boyd, a critic of Australia's built surroundings, described Australia as "'the constant sponge lying in the Pacific', following the fashions of overseas and lacking confidence in home-produced, original ideas". In 1956, dadaist comedian Barry Humphries performed the character of Edna Everage as a parody of a house-proud housewife of staid 1950s Melbourne suburbia (the character only later morphed into a critique of self-obsessed celebrity culture). It was the first of many of his satirical stage and screen creations based around quirky Australian characters: Sandy Stone, a morose elderly suburbanite, Barry McKenzie a naive Australian expat in London and Sir Les Patterson, a vulgar parody of a Whitlam-era politician.

Some writers defended suburban life. Journalist Craig Macgregor saw suburban life as a "...solution to the needs of migrants..." Hugh Stretton argued that "plenty of dreary lives are indeed lived in the suburbs... but most of them might well be worse in other surroundings". Historian Peter Cuffley has recalled life for a child in a new outer suburb of Melbourne as having a kind of joyous excitement. "Our imaginations saved us from finding life too humdrum, as did the wild freedom of being able to roam far and wide in different kinds of (neighbouring) bushland...Children in the suburbs found space in backyards, streets and lanes, playgrounds and reserves..."

In 1954, the Menzies Government formally announced the introduction of the new two-tiered TV system—a government-funded service run by the ABC, and two commercial services in Sydney and Melbourne, with the 1956 Summer Olympics in Melbourne being a major driving force behind the introduction of television to Australia. Colour TV began broadcasting in 1975.

=== Indigenous assimilation and child removal ===
The 1951 Native Welfare Conference of state and Commonwealth officials had agreed on a policy of cultural assimilation for all Aboriginal Australians. Paul Hasluck, the Commonwealth Minister for Territories, stated: "Assimilation means, in practical terms, that, in the course of time, it is expected that all persons of aboriginal blood or mixed blood in Australia will live like other white Australians do."

Controls over the daily lives of Aboriginal people and the removal of Aboriginal children of mixed descent continued under the policy of assimilation, although the control was now largely exercised by Welfare Boards and removals were justified on welfare grounds. The number of Aboriginal people deemed to be wards of the state under Northern Territory welfare laws doubled to 11,000 from 1950 to 1965.

During this period, the policy of assimilation attracted increasing criticism from Aboriginal people and their supporters on the grounds of its negative effects on Aboriginal families and its denial of Aboriginal cultural autonomy. Removals of Aboriginal children of mixed descent from their families slowed by the late 1960s and by 1973 the Commonwealth had adopted a policy of self-determination for Indigenous Australians.

In 1997, the Human Rights and Equal Opportunity Commission estimated that between 10 per cent and one-third of Aboriginal children had been removed from their families from 1910 to 1970. Regional studies indicate that 15 per cent of Aboriginal children were removed in New South Wales from 1899 to 1968, while the figure for Victoria was about 10 per cent. Robert Manne estimates that the figure for Australia as a whole was closer to 10 per cent.

Summarising the policy of assimilation and forced removals of Aboriginal children of mixed descent, Richard Broome concludes: "Even though the children's material conditions and Western education may have been improved by removal, even though some removals were necessary, and even though some people were thankful for it in retrospect, overall it was a disaster....It was a rupturing of tens of thousands of Aboriginal families, aimed at eradicating Aboriginality from the nation in the cause of homogeneity and in fear of difference."

=== Alliances (1950–1972) ===
In the early 1950s, the Menzies government saw Australia as part of a "triple alliance" in concert with both the US and traditional ally Britain. At first, "the Australian leadership opted for a consistently pro-British line in diplomacy", while at the same time looking for opportunities to involve the US in South East Asia. Thus, the government committed military forces to the Korean War and the Malayan Emergency and hosted British nuclear tests after 1952. Australia was also the only Commonwealth country to offer support to the British during the Suez Crisis.

Menzies oversaw an effusive welcome to Queen Elizabeth II on the first visit to Australia by a reigning monarch, in 1954. He made the following remarks during a light-hearted speech to an American audience in New York, while on his way to attend her coronation in 1953: "We in Australia, of course, are British, if I may say so, to the boot heels...but we stand together – our people stand together – till the crack of doom."

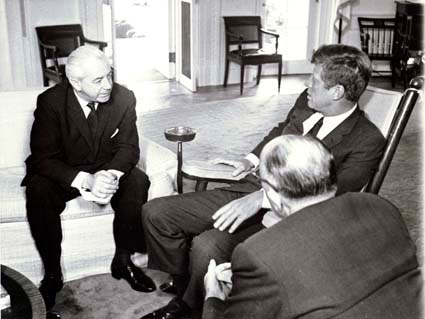
Harold Holt and US president John F. Kennedy in the Oval Office in Washington, D.C., 1963. By the 1960s, Australian defence policy had shifted from Britain to the US as key ally.

As British influence declined in South East Asia, the US alliance came to have greater significance for Australian leaders and the Australian economy. British investment in Australia remained significant until the late 1970s, but trade with Britain declined through the 1950s and 1960s. In the late 1950s the Australian Army began to re-equip using US military equipment. In 1962, the US established a naval communications station at North West Cape, the first of several built during the next decade. Most significantly, in 1962, Australian Army advisors were sent to help train South Vietnamese forces, in a developing conflict in which the British had no part.

According to diplomat Alan Renouf, the dominant theme in Australia's foreign policy under Australia's Liberal–Country Party governments of the 1950s and 1960s was anti-communism. Another former diplomat, Gregory Clark, suggested that it was specifically a fear of China that drove Australian foreign policy decisions for twenty years. The ANZUS security treaty, which had been signed in 1951, had its origins in Australia's and New Zealand's fears of a rearmed Japan. Its obligations on the US, Australia and New Zealand are vague, but its influence on Australian foreign policy thinking, at times has been significant. The SEATO treaty, signed only three years later, clearly demonstrated Australia's position as a US ally in the emerging Cold War.

As Britain struggled to enter the Common Market in the 1960s, Australia saw that its historic ties with the mother country were rapidly fraying. Canberra was alarmed but kept a low profile, not wanting to alienate London. Russel Ward states that the implications of British entry into Europe in 1973: "seemed shattering to most Australians, particularly to older people and conservatives." Carl Bridge, however, points out that Australia had been "hedging its British bets" for some time. The ANZUS treaty and Australia's decision to enter the Vietnam War did not involve Britain and by 1967 Japan was Australia's leading export partner and the US her largest source of imports. According to Bridge, Australia's decision not to follow Britain's devaluation of her currency in 1967 "marked the demise of British Australia."

=== Vietnam War ===
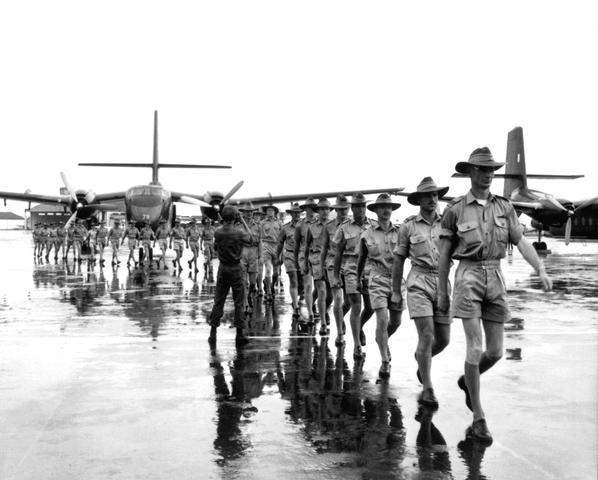
Personnel and aircraft of RAAF Transport Flight Vietnam arrive in South Vietnam in August 1964.

By 1965, Australia had increased the size of the Australian Army Training Team Vietnam (AATTV), and in April the Government made a sudden announcement that "after close consultation with the United States", a battalion of troops was to be sent to South Vietnam. In parliament, Menzies emphasised the argument that "our alliances made demands on us". The alliance involved was presumably, the Southeast Asia Treaty Organization (SEATO), and Australia was providing military assistance because South Vietnam, a signatory to SEATO, had apparently requested it. Documents released in 1971 indicated that the decision to commit troops was made by Australia and the US, not at the request of South Vietnam. By 1968, there were three Australian Army battalions at any one time at the 1st Australian Task Force (1ATF) base at Nui Dat in addition to the advisers of the AATTV placed throughout Vietnam, and personnel reached a peak total of almost 8,000, comprising about one third of the Army's combat capacity. Between 1962 and 1972 almost 60,000 personnel served in Vietnam, including ground troops, naval forces and air assets.

In July 1966, new prime minister Harold Holt expressed his government's support for the US and its role in Vietnam in particular. "I don't know where people would choose to look for the security of this country were it not for the friendship and strength of the United States." While on a visit in the same year to the US, Holt assured President Lyndon B. Johnson "...I hope there is corner of your mind and heart which takes cheer from the fact that you have an admiring friend, a staunch friend, [Australia] that will be all the way with LBJ."

The Liberal-CP Government was returned with a massive majority in elections held in December 1966, fought over national security issues including Vietnam. The opposition Labor Party had advocated the withdrawal of all conscripts from Vietnam, but its deputy leader Gough Whitlam had stated that a Labor government might maintain regular army troops there. Arthur Calwell, who had been leader of the Labor Party since 1960, retired in favour of Whitlam a few months later.

Despite Holt's sentiments and his government's electoral success in 1966, the war became unpopular in Australia, as it did in the United States. The movements to end Australia's involvement gathered strength after the Tet Offensive of early 1968 and compulsory national service (selected by ballot) became increasingly unpopular. In the 1969 elections, the government hung on despite a significant decline in popularity. Moratorium marches held across Australia in mid-1970 attracted large crowds—the Melbourne march of 100,000 being led by Labor MP Jim Cairns. As the Nixon administration proceeded with Vietnamization of the war and began the withdrawal of troops, so did the Australian Government. In November 1970 1st Australian Task Force was reduced to two battalions and in November 1971, 1ATF was withdrawn from Vietnam. The last military advisers of the AATTV were withdrawn by the Whitlam Labor government in mid-December 1972.

The Australian military presence in Vietnam had lasted 10 years, and in purely human cost, more than 500 had been killed and more than 2,000 wounded. The war cost Australia $218 million between 1962 and 1972.

== Reform and reaction (1972–1996) ==
=== Whitlam government (1972–75) ===
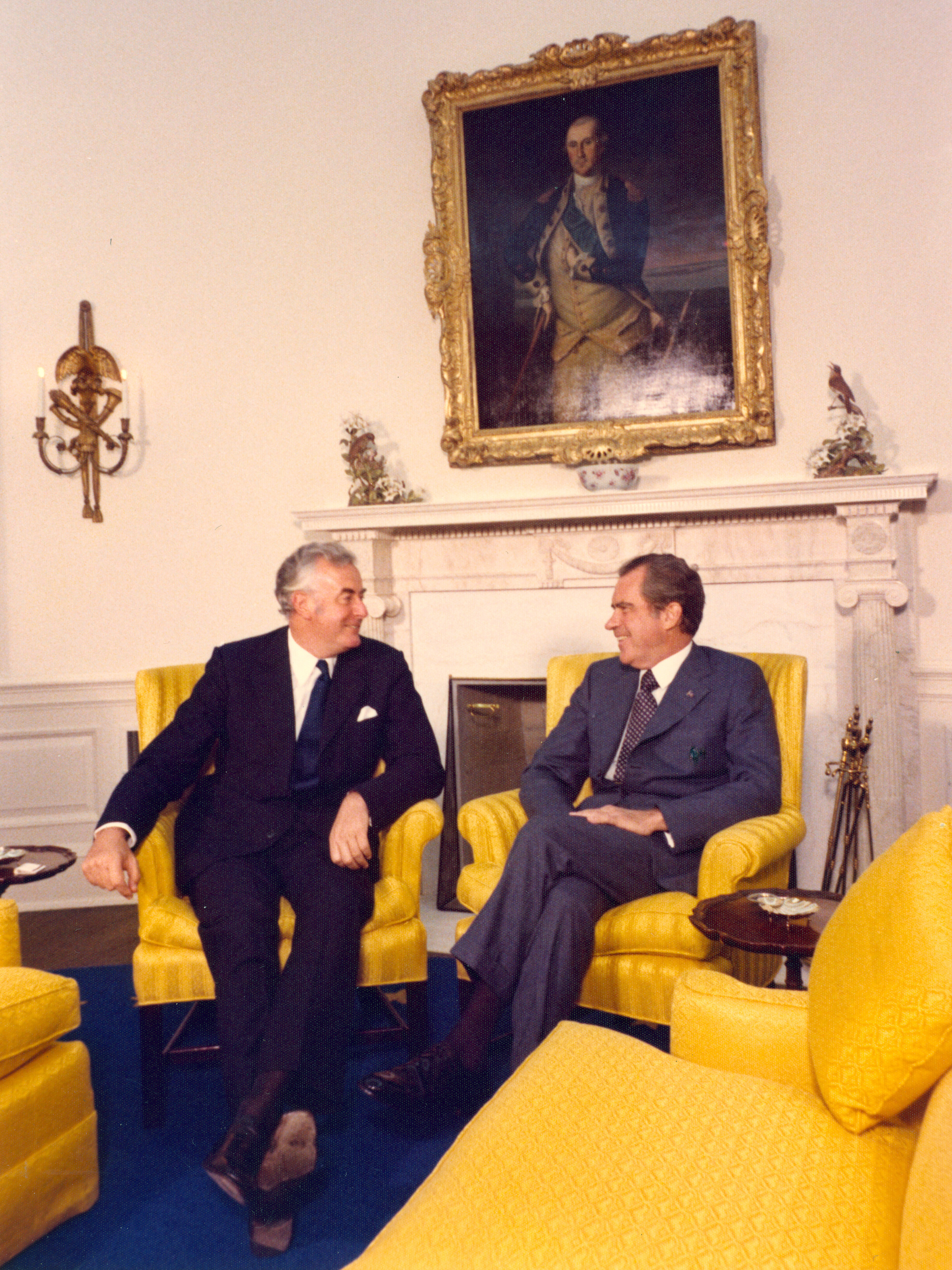
Gough Whitlam and US president Richard Nixon in 1973. The Whitlam government was responsible for significant reforms, but went on to be dismissed in controversial circumstances.

Elected in December 1972 after 23 years in opposition, Labor won office under Gough Whitlam, introducing significant reforms and expanding the federal budget. Welfare benefits were extended and payment rates increased, a national health insurance scheme was introduced, and divorce laws liberalised. Commonwealth expenditure on schools trebled in the two years to mid-1975 and the Commonwealth assumed responsibility for funding higher education, abolishing tuition fees. In foreign affairs, the new government prioritised the Asia Pacific region, formally abolishing the White Australia policy, recognising Communist China and enhancing ties with Indonesia. Conscription was abolished and the remaining Australian troops in Vietnam withdrawn. The Australian national anthem was changed from God Save the Queen to Advance Australia Fair, the imperial honours system was replaced at the Commonwealth level by the Order of Australia, and Queen Elizabeth II was officially styled Queen of Australia. Relations with the US, however, became strained after government members criticised the resumption of the US bombing campaign in North Vietnam.

In Indigenous affairs, the government introduced a policy of self-determination for Aboriginal people in economic, social and political affairs. Federal expenditure on Aboriginal services increased from $23 million to $141 million during the three years of the government. One of the first acts of the Whitlam government was to establish a Royal Commission into land rights in the Northern Territory under Justice Woodward. Legislation based on its findings was passed into law by the Fraser government in 1976, as the Aboriginal Land Rights Act 1976.

The government granted Papua New Guinea independence on 16 September 1975, after Australia had been the colonial administrator of Papua since 1902, and of New Guinea since 1914.

As the Whitlam government did not control the Senate, much of its legislation was rejected or amended. After Labor was re-elected with a reduced majority at elections in May 1974, the Senate remained an obstacle to its political agenda. The government's popularity was also harmed by deteriorating economic conditions and a series of political scandals. Increased government spending, rapid wage growth, booming commodity prices and the first OPEC oil shock led to economic instability. The unemployment rate reached post-war high of 3.6 per cent in late 1974 and the annual inflation rate hit 17 per cent.

In 1974–75 the government began negotiations for US$4 billion in foreign loans to fund state development of Australia's mineral and energy resources. Minister Rex Connor conducted secret discussions with a loan broker from Pakistan, and Treasurer Jim Cairns misled parliament about the issue. Arguing the government was incompetent following the Loans Affair, the opposition Liberal-Country Party Coalition delayed passage of the government's money bills in the Senate, until the government would promise a new election. Whitlam refused and the deadlock ended when his government was controversially dismissed by the Governor-General, John Kerr on 11 November 1975. Opposition leader Malcolm Fraser was installed as caretaker prime minister, pending an election.

=== Fraser government (1975–83) ===
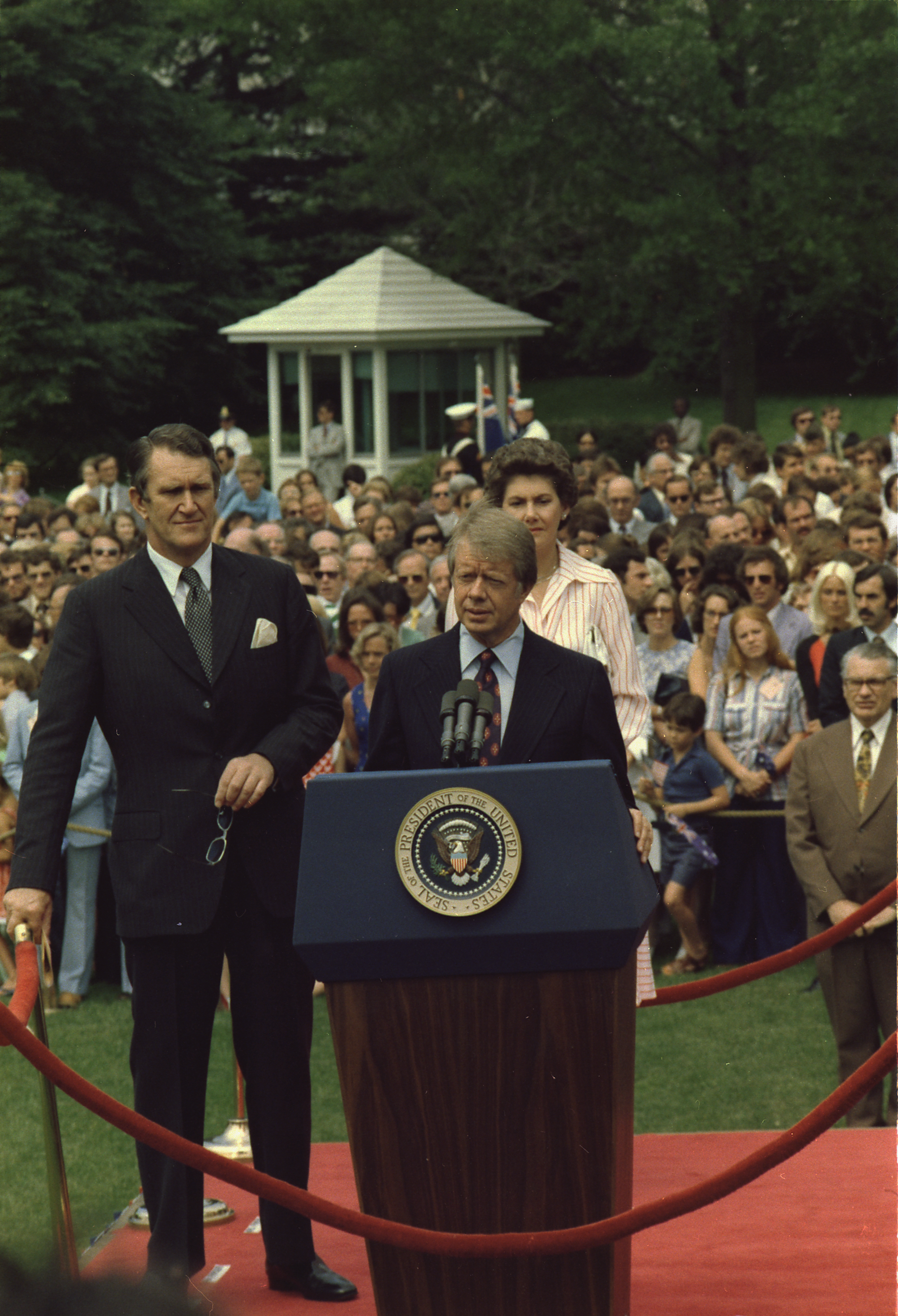
Malcolm Fraser and US president Jimmy Carter in 1977.

The Federal elections of December 1975 resulted in a landslide victory for the Liberal-Country Party coalition and Malcolm Fraser continued as prime minister. The coalition government won subsequent elections in 1977 and 1980, making Fraser the second longest serving Australian prime minister up to that time. The Fraser government espoused a policy of administrative competence and economic austerity leavened by progressive humanitarian, social and environmental interventions. The government enacted the Whitlam government's land rights bill with few changes, increased immigration, and resettled Indochinese refugees. It promoted multiculturalism and in 1978 established the Special Broadcasting Service (SBS) as a multicultural broadcaster. In foreign policy, the government continued Labor's friendly relations with China and Indonesia, repaired the frayed relationship with the US and opposed white minority rule in South Africa and Rhodesia. Environmental policies included banning resource development on Fraser Island and the Great Barrier Reef, creating Kakadu National Park and banning whaling. However, the government refused to use Commonwealth powers to stop the construction of the Franklin Dam in Tasmania in 1982 and the resulting grassroots campaign against the dam contributed to the emergence of an influential environmental movement in Australia.

On the economic front, the Fraser government followed a "fight inflation first" strategy centred on budget cuts and wage restraint. Welfare benefits were restricted, the universal healthcare system was partially dismantled, and university funding per student cut. However, by the early 1980s economic conditions were deteriorating. The second oil shock in 1979 increased inflation which was exacerbated by a boom in commodity prices and a sharp increase in real wages. An international recession, the collapse of the resources boom and a severe drought in eastern Australia saw unemployment rise. The government responded with Keynesian deficit spending in its 1982 Budget, but by 1983 both unemployment and annual inflation exceeded 10 per cent. At the Federal elections in March 1983 the coalition government was comfortably defeated by Labor under its popular new leader Bob Hawke.

=== Labor governments (1983–1996) ===
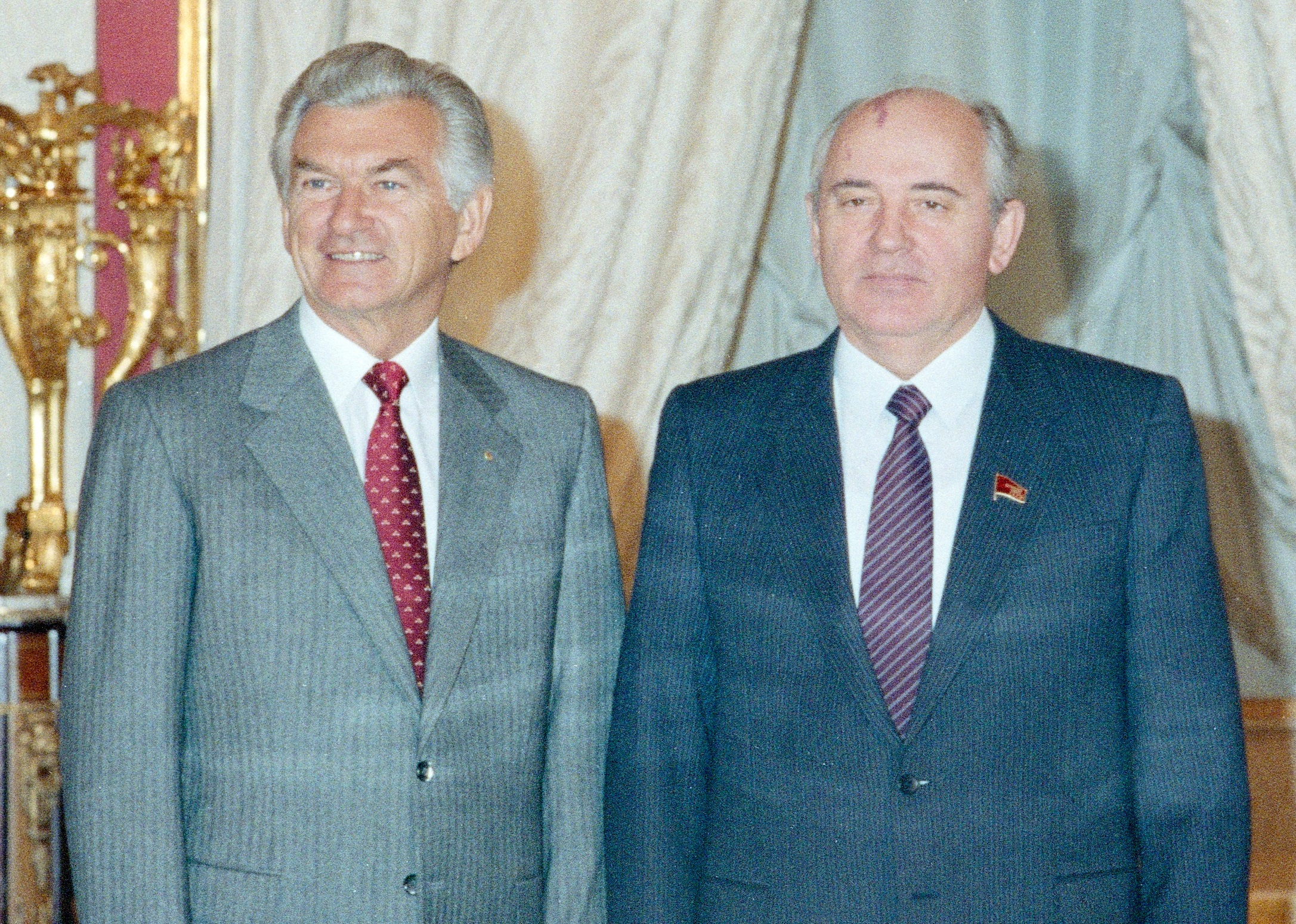
Bob Hawke with Soviet leader Mikhail Gorbachev in 1987. Hawke went on to become the longest-serving Labor Prime Minister.

The Hawke government pursued a mixture of free market reforms and consensus politics featuring "summits" of government representatives, business leaders, trade unions and non-government organisations in order to reach consensus on key issues such as economic policy and tax reform. The centrepiece of this policy mix was an Accord with trade unions under which wage demands would be curtailed in return for increased social benefits. Welfare payments were increased and better targeted to those on low incomes, and a retirement benefits scheme (superannuation) was extended to most employees. A new universal health insurance scheme, Medicare, was introduced. The Treasurer Paul Keating oversaw a program of deregulation and micro-economic reforms which broke with the Keynesian economics that had traditionally been favoured by the Labor party. These reforms included floating the Australian dollar, deregulating capital markets and allowing competition from foreign banks. Business regulation and competition policy was streamlined, tariffs and quotas on imports were reduced, and a number of government enterprises were privatised. The higher education system was restructured and significantly expanded, partly funded by the reintroduction of fees in the form of student loans and "contributions" (HECS). Paul Kelly concludes that, "In the 1980s both Labor and non-Labor underwent internal philosophical revolutions to support a new set of ideas—faith in markets, deregulation, a reduced role for government, low protection and the creation of a new cooperative enterprise culture."

The government's environmental interventions included stopping the Franklin Dam in Tasmania, banning new uranium mines at Jabiluka, and proposing Kakadu National park for world heritage listing. In foreign policy, the government maintained strong relations with the US and was instrumental in the formation of the Asia Pacific Economic Cooperation (APEC) group. Australia contributed naval ships and troops to UN forces in the Gulf War after Iraq had invaded Kuwait in 1990.

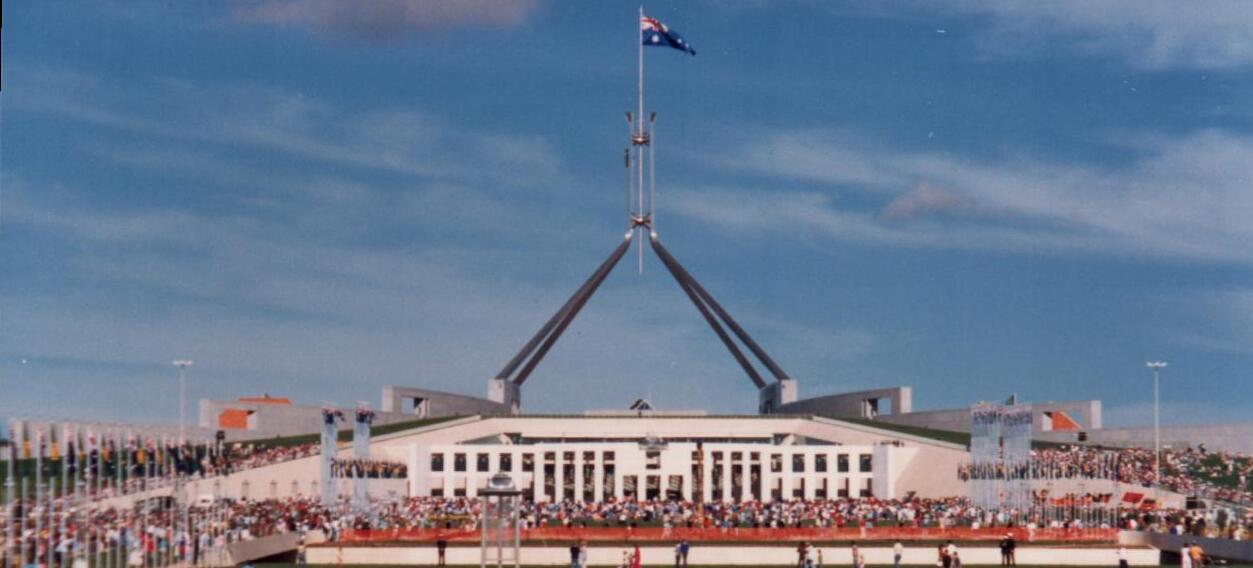
Opening of the new Parliament House during the Australian Bicentenary, May 1988.

The government took other initiatives aimed at fostering national unity. The Australia Act 1986 eliminated the last vestiges of British legal authority at the federal level. The Australian Bicentenary in 1988 was the focus of year-long celebrations with multicultural themes. The World Expo 88 was held in Brisbane and a new Parliament House in Canberra was opened.

Strong economic growth, falling unemployment, an unstable opposition, and Bob Hawke's popularity with the public contributed to the re-election of the Hawke government in 1984, 1987 and 1990. However, the economy went into recession in 1990 and by late 1991 the unemployment rate had risen above 10 per cent. With the government's popularity falling, Paul Keating successfully challenged for the leadership and became prime minister in December 1991.

The Keating government's first priority was economic recovery. In February 1992 it released the "One Nation" job creation package and later legislated tax cuts to corporations and individuals to boost economic growth. Unemployment reached 11.4 per cent in 1992—the highest since the Great Depression in Australia. The Liberal-National opposition had proposed an ambitious plan of economic reform to take to the 1993 Election, including the introduction of a Goods and Services Tax. Keating campaigned strongly against the tax and was returned to office in March 1993.

Paul Keating delivering the Redfern Park Speech on 10 December 1992

In May 1994 a more ambitious "Working Nation" jobs program was introduced. The Keating government also pursued a number of "big picture" issues throughout its two terms including increased political and economic engagement in the Asia Pacific region, Indigenous reconciliation, and an Australian republic. The government engaged closely with the Indonesian president, Suharto and other regional partners, and successfully campaigned to increase the role of APEC as a major forum for strategic and economic co-operation. A Council for Aboriginal Reconciliation was established and, following the High Court of Australia's historic Mabo decision in 1992, the first national Native Title legislation was introduced to regulate claims and provide compensation for loss of native title. In 1993, Keating established a Republic Advisory Committee to examine options for Australia becoming a republic. The government also introduced family payments and a superannuation guarantee with compulsory employer contributions.

Under the Hawke government the annual migration intake had more than doubled from 54,500 in 1984–85 to more than 120,000 in 1989–90. The Keating government responded to community concerns about the pace of immigration by cutting the immigration intake and introducing mandatory detention for illegal immigrants arriving without a valid visa. Immigration fell to 67,900 in 1992–93.

With foreign debt, inflation and unemployment still stubbornly high, Keating lost the March 1996 Election to the Liberals' John Howard.

== Australia in a globalised world (1996–2022) ==
=== Howard government (1996–2007) ===
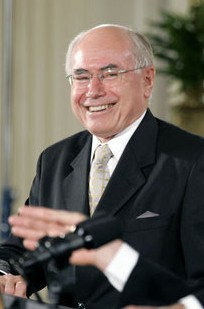
John Howard, the 25th Prime Minister of Australia held office from 1996 to 2007, the second-longest tenure in history

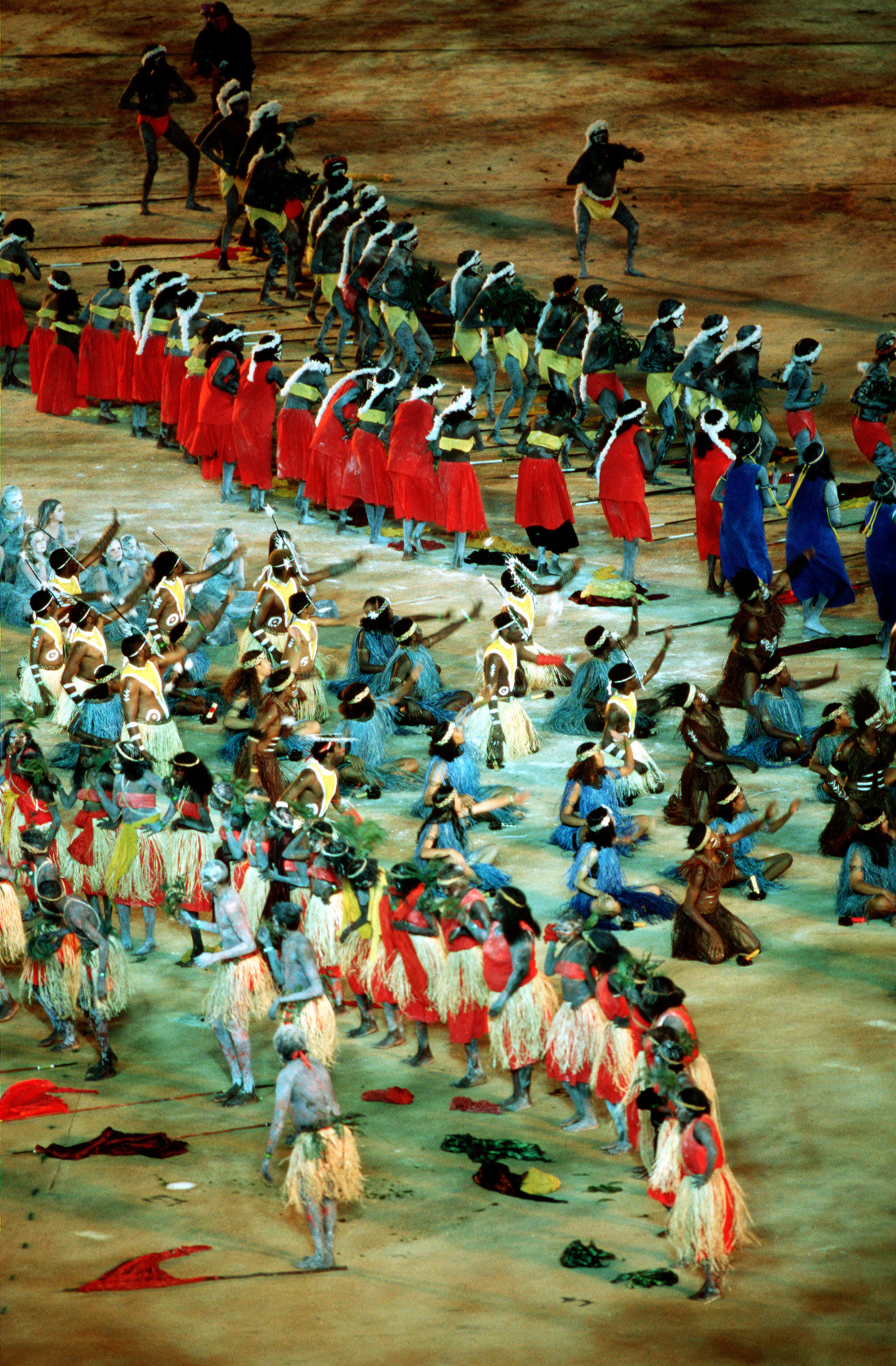
Opening ceremony of the 2000 Summer Olympics in Sydney.

John Howard with a Liberal–National Party coalition served as Prime Minister from 1996 until 2007, winning re-election in 1998, 2001 and 2004 to become the second-longest-serving prime minister after Menzies. The Howard government introduced a nationwide gun control scheme following a mass shooting at Port Arthur. The coalition introduced industrial relations reforms in 1996 which promoted individual contracts and enterprise bargaining. In 2006, it introduced the WorkChoices legislation, which made it easier for small businesses to terminate employment. After the 1996 election, Howard and treasurer Peter Costello proposed a Goods and Services Tax (GST) which they successfully took to the electorate in 1998 and implemented in July 2000.

The government responded to the populist anti-immigration policies of Pauline Hanson and her One Nation party by publicly criticising elites and political correctness and emphasising Australian values. The coalition initially cut immigration intakes, abolished the Office of Multicultural Affairs and other multicultural agencies, and introduced citizenship tests for migrants. Following a sharp increase in unauthorised arrivals by boat from 1999, the government opened new mandatory detention centres in remote areas of Australia and issued temporary visas for those found to be refugees. Following the Children Overboard affair and the Tampa Affair in 2001, the government introduced the Pacific Solution, which involved moving unauthorised immigrants to detention centres in Nauru and Papua New Guinea while their refugee status was determined, as well as a policy of turning back vessels intercepted at sea.

In Indigenous affairs the prime minister rejected calls for a treaty with Indigenous Australians and an apology for past actions which had harmed them. Instead, the government pursued a policy of "practical reconciliation" involving specific measures to improve Indigenous education, health, employment and housing. In response to the High Court's decision in Wik Peoples v Queensland, in 1996, the government amended native title legislation to limit native title claims. In 2007, following the release of the "Little Children are Sacred" report detailing widespread abuse in Aboriginal communities, the Howard government launched the Northern Territory Intervention in order to create a safe environment for Indigenous children. The government's response was criticised by the co-chairs of the report, but was supported by the Labor opposition.

Honouring an election commitment, the Howard government set up a people's convention on an Australian republic. The resulting 1999 referendum on a republic failed. Howard, a monarchist, became the only Australian prime minister to publicly oppose a constitutional amendment he had put to the people.

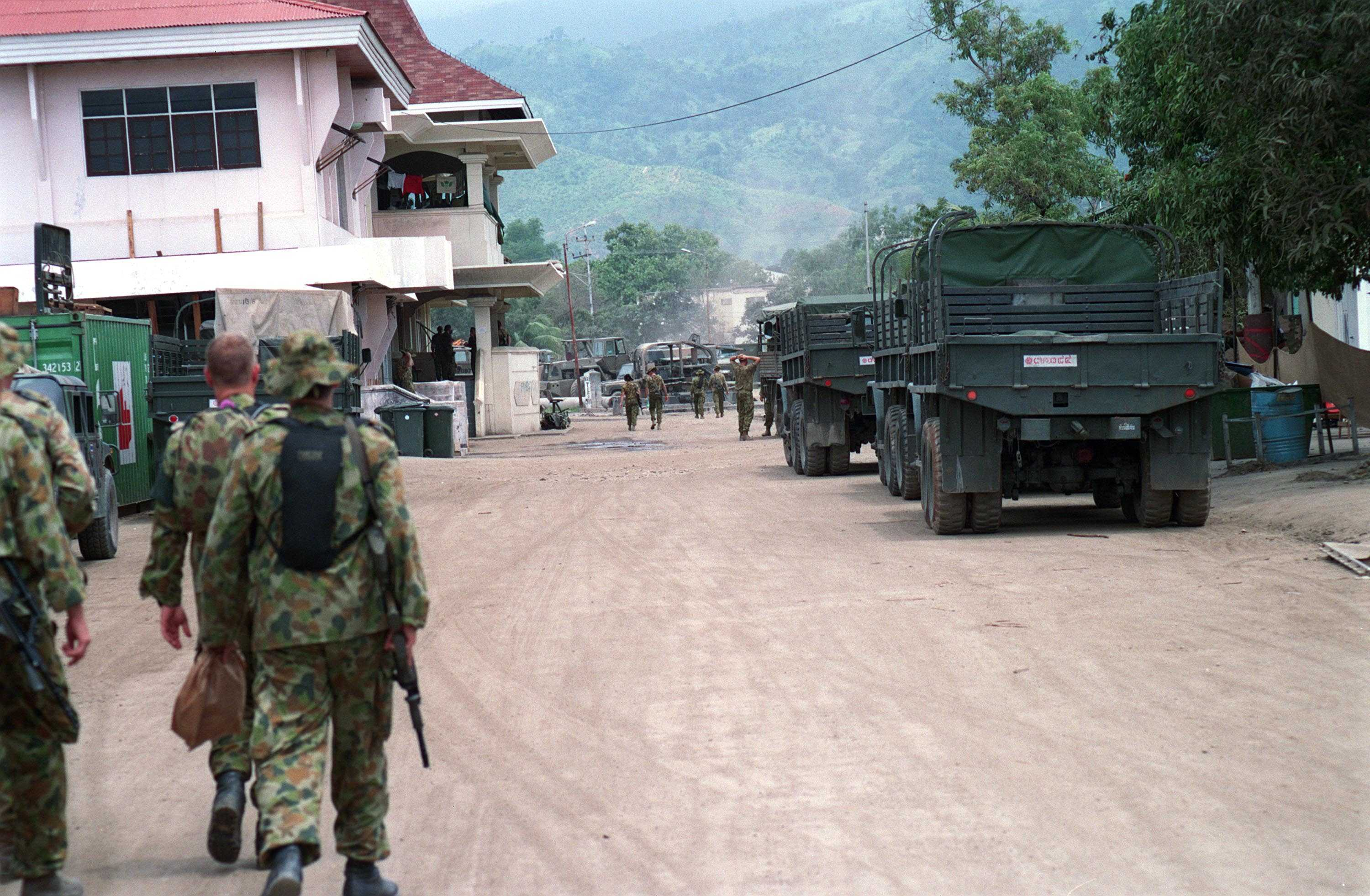
The Australian-led coalition INTERFET during the East Timor crisis from 1999 to 2002

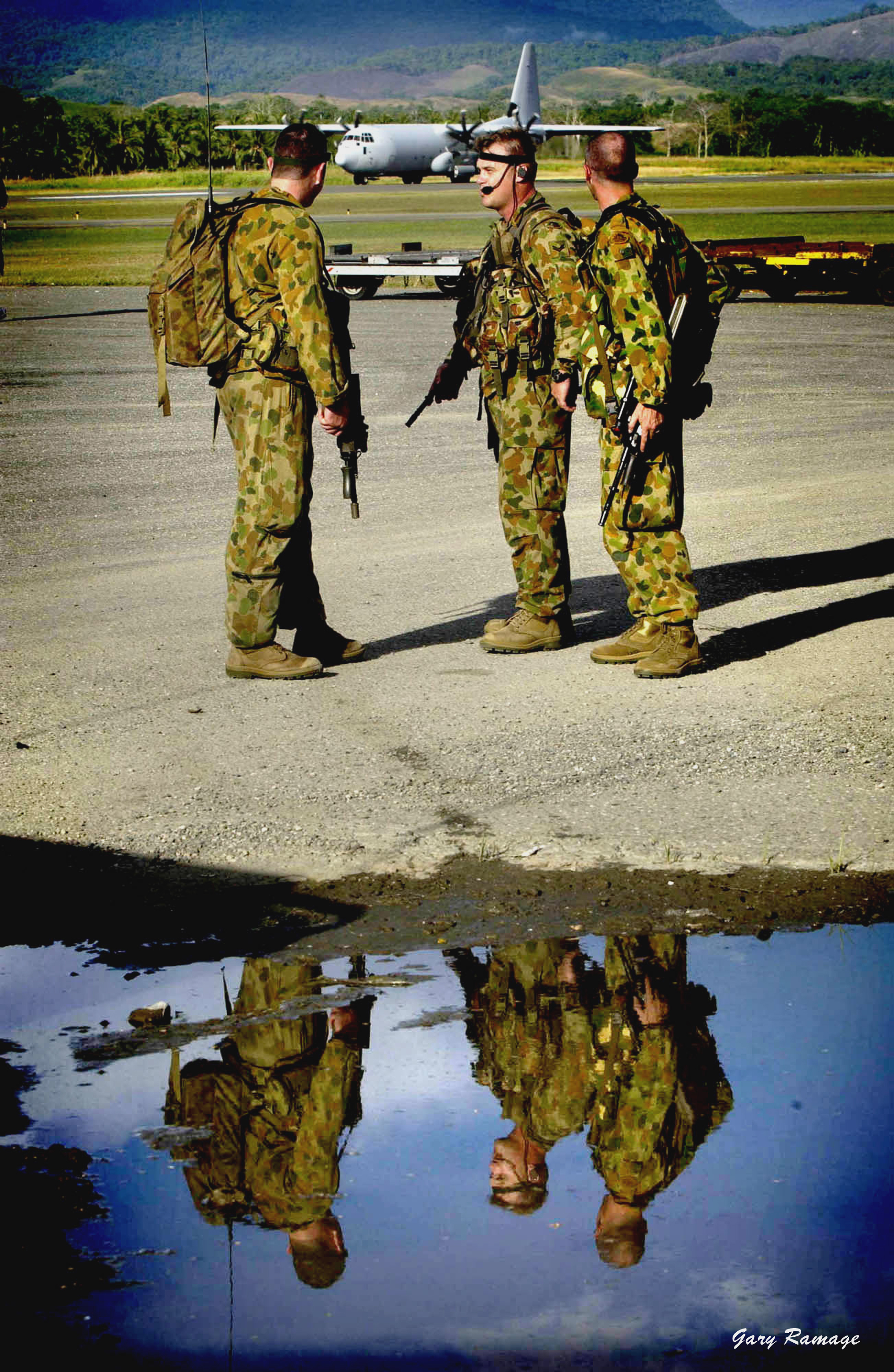
The Australian-led multinational force in response to the Solomon Islands conflict (1999–2003). Operation RAMSI (2003–2017) became Australia's largest effort in democracy and nation-building

In 1999, Australia led a United Nations force into East Timor to help establish democracy and independence for that nation, following political violence. Australia also committed to other peacekeeping and stabilisation operations: notably in Bougainville, including Operation Bel Isi (1998–2003); as well as Operation Helpem Fren and the Australian-led Regional Assistance Mission to Solomon Islands (RAMSI) in the early 2000s; and the 2006 East Timorese crisis. Following the September 2001 terrorist attacks on the US and the subsequent War on Terror, Australia committed troops to the Afghanistan War and the Iraq War. These events, along with the 2002 Bali Bombings and other terrorist incidents, led to the creation of a National Security Committee and further anti-terrorist legislation.

In foreign affairs, the government advocated a policy of "Asia first, but not Asia only", emphasising traditional links to the Commonwealth and the US. Relations with Indonesia became strained over East Timor but generally improved after the Bali bombings. Australia's support of US policy during the War on Terror was followed by an Australia-United States Free Trade Agreement in 2004. Trade agreements with Singapore and Thailand were also secured and relations with China improved. Australia joined the US in refusing to ratify the Kyoto Protocol on greenhouse gas emissions, arguing that it would harm Australia's economy and would be ineffective without the participation of China and India.

After initial cuts, the immigration intake increased steadily, with a bias towards skilled workers to meet the needs of a rapidly growing economy. Immigration also became more diverse, with the proportion of immigrants from South Asia increasing from 8 per cent in 1996–97 to 20 per cent in 2007–08. Inbound tourism also grew, helped by the Sydney Olympic games in 2000.

The economy continued its uninterrupted expansion since the early 1990s recession, with record jobs growth and the lowest unemployment rates since the 1970s. Exports, imports and foreign investment grew, and China became Australia's second largest trading partner after Japan. The coalition delivered budget surpluses in most years which, along with the proceeds of government asset sales, were partly invested in a Future Fund to reduce the national debt. Income inequality and private debt increased as the economy expanded, with the biggest increase in incomes accruing to the top 10 per cent of income earners.

By 2007, the Howard government was consistently trailing the Labor opposition in opinion polls, with key issues being rising interest rates, the unpopular Work Choices industrial relations reforms, and climate change policy. There were also leadership tensions between Howard and Costello, and opinion polls indicated a desire for a generational change in leadership. Labor won the November 2007 election with a swing of more than 5 per cent and Howard became only the second sitting prime minister to lose his seat in an election.

=== Labor governments (2007–2013) ===
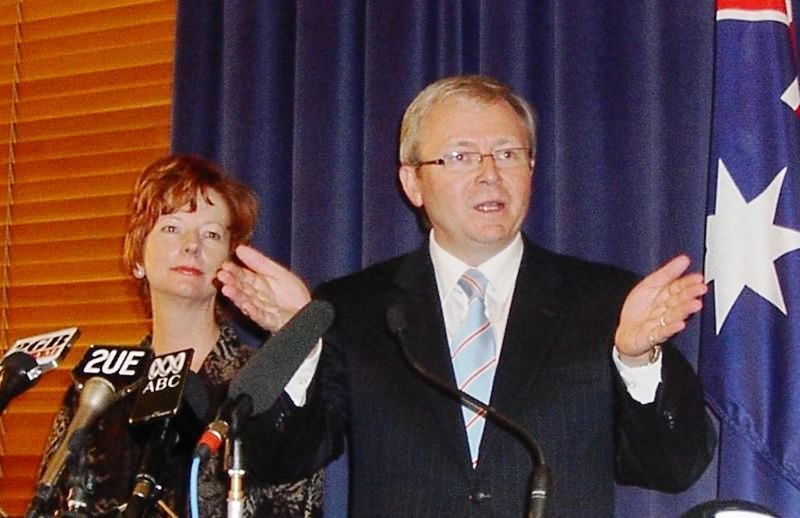
Kevin Rudd and Julia Gillard in 2006. Gillard went on to become Australia's first female Prime Minister.

The Rudd government moved quickly to ratify the Kyoto protocols, dismantle the previous government's Work Choices industrial relations reforms, and issue an apology to Aboriginal Australians for past policies, particularly the removal of Aboriginal children from their families. The government was soon confronted by the 2008 financial crisis and the Great Recession, responding with a series of economic stimulus measures worth A$75 billion. Although economic growth slowed in 2008, Australia was one of the few advanced economies in the world to avoid recession.

The Rudd government proposed an emissions trading scheme (ETS) to address climate change, but the legislation was twice rejected in the Senate. After the failed December 2009 UN Climate Change Conference in Copenhagen, the government decided to postpone its ETS until 2013, a decision which saw Labor lose some electoral support to the Greens. The government's proposed a Resources Super Profits Tax adversely affected Labor's support in the resource-rich states of Queensland and Western Australia.

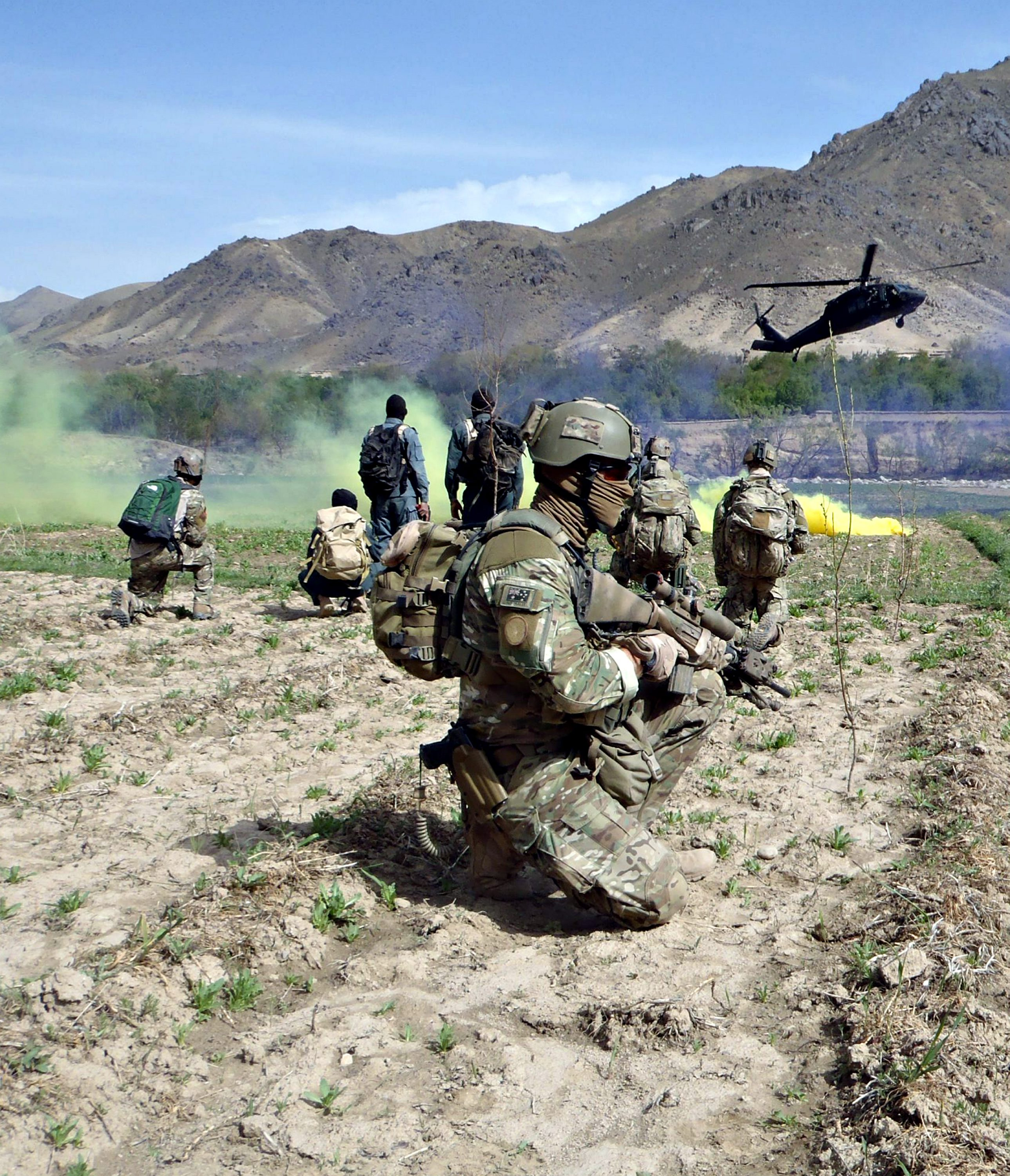
Australian special forces wait for extraction during the War in Afghanistan (2001–2021)

The government changed its predecessor's asylum seeker policy by closing the Nauru processing centre, abolished temporary protection visas and improving the legal rights and processing time for applicants for asylum. However, unauthorised arrivals by boat increased sharply from 2009 and the number in mandatory detention stretched capacity. The new leader of the opposition, Tony Abbot, promised that a coalition government would "stop the boats."

In June 2010, with the government behind the opposition in polls and Rudd's popularity falling, the Labor caucus replaced Rudd with Julia Gillard as leader: Australia's first female prime minister. The new leader was able to negotiate concessions on a new mining tax with large mining companies but failed to reach agreement with East Timor on a proposed migration processing centre there.

Following the August 2010 federal election, Gillard formed a minority Labor government with the support of the Australian Greens and three independents. The Gillard government passed enabling legislation for a National Broadband Network, a carbon pricing scheme, a mining tax, a National Disability Insurance Scheme, and school funding reforms. The government negotiated an agreement with Malaysia to process some asylum seekers there but the plan was struck down by the High Court. In response, the government reopened offshore processing centres on Manus Island and Nauru.

Following mounting leadership speculation and poor polling for the government, Rudd defeated Gillard in a leadership ballot in June 2013 and returned as prime minister, promising to replace the carbon tax with an emissions trading scheme and to ensure that people arriving without authority by boat would not be settled in Australia. The opposition, promising to "stop the boats," abolish the carbon tax and mining tax, and reduce the Budget deficit and government debt, won the September 2013 election.

=== Liberal-National Coalition governments (2013–2022) ===
The return of the Liberal-National Coalition to power after six years in opposition initially failed to restore stability to the office of prime minister. Prime Minister Tony Abbott's rival Malcolm Turnbull challenged for and won the leadership of the Liberals within Abbott's first term. After Turnbull narrowly returned the coalition to office in 2016, Party dissatisfaction with his leadership saw him replaced by Scott Morrison in 2018.

==== Abbott government (2013–2015) ====
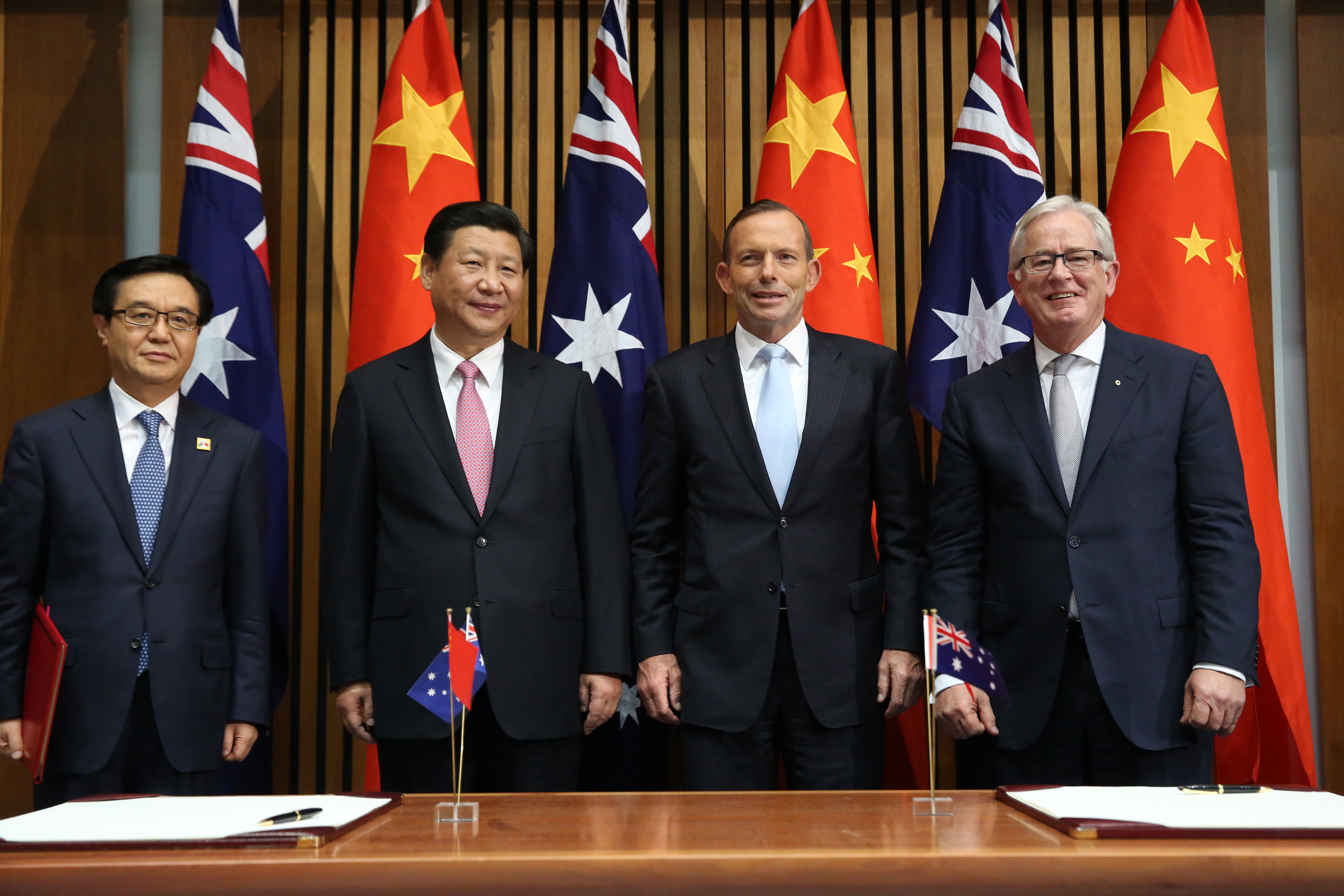
Prime Minister Tony Abbott signing the China–Australia Free Trade Agreement with President Xi Jinping, November 2014

Prime Minister Tony Abbott's government began implementing its policies on unauthorised maritime arrivals, including Operation Sovereign Borders, boat turnbacks, the reintroduction of temporary protection visas, and the resettlement in third countries of those found to be refugees. The number of people arriving by boat fell from 20,587 in 2013 to none in 2015. The government continued Australia's economic engagement with Asia, signing trade agreements with China, South Korea and Japan. The government also embraced the intervention against Islamic State in Iraq and Syria, joining the air campaign, sending special forces and providing training for the Iraqi army.

The government's May 2014 Budget proved unpopular, with the perception that it had involved breaking a number of election promises. The government secured the passage of legislation abolishing the carbon tax (July 2014) and the mining tax (September 2014).

The prime minister announced a number of decisions – most notably the reintroduction of knighthoods and a knighthood for Prince Philip, Duke of Edinburgh – which had not been approved by cabinet and which were widely criticised in the media. By September 2015 the government had lost 30 Newspolls in a row and Malcolm Turnbull successfully challenged for the leadership.

==== Turnbull government (2015–2018) ====
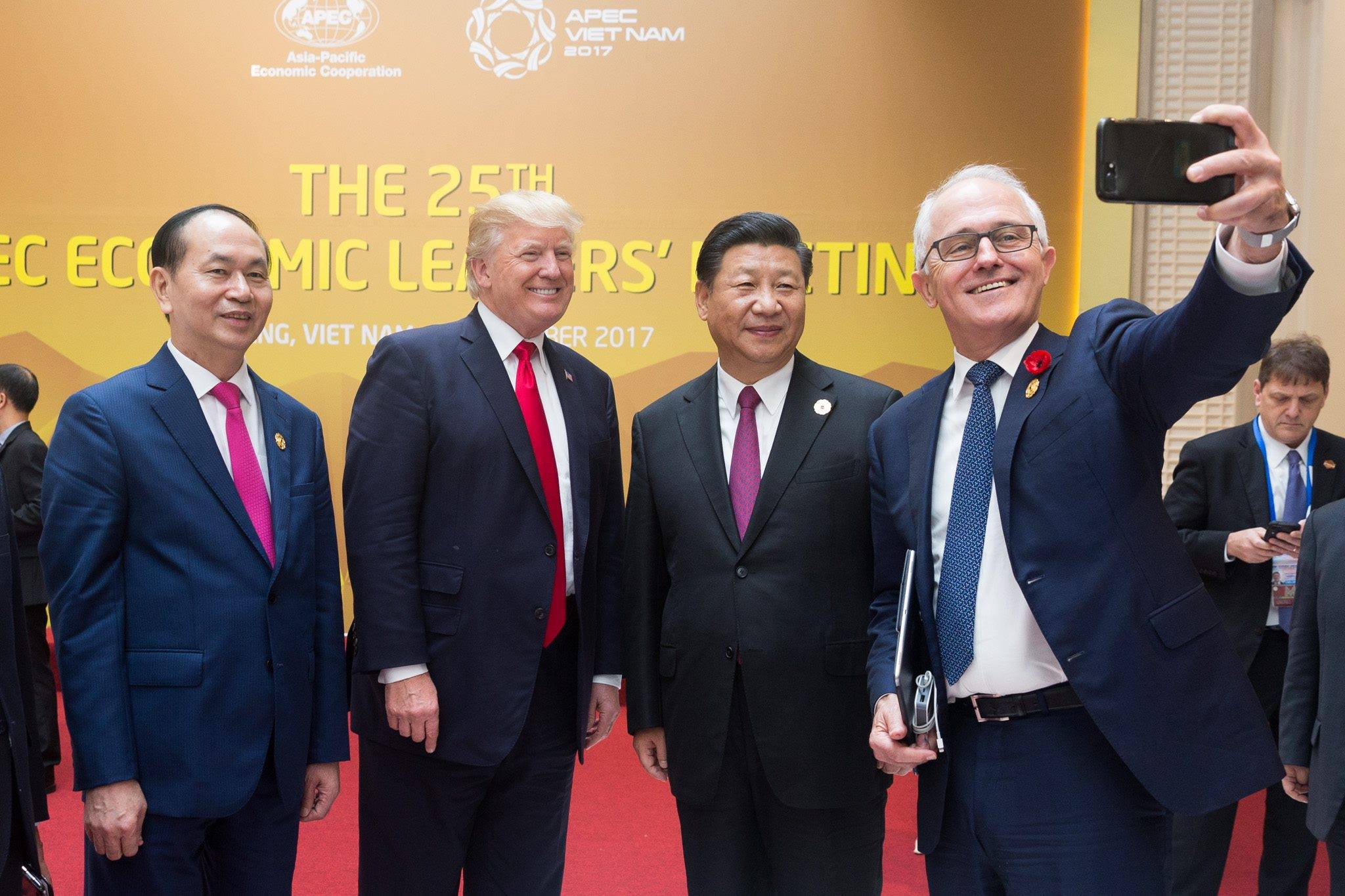
Malcolm Turnbull takes a selfie with Trần Đại Quang, Donald Trump and Xi Jinping, November 2017.

The new Turnbull government announced a National Innovation and Science Agenda and delivered a Budget featuring cuts to company tax. However, the elections of July 2016 saw the government returned with a majority on only one and a minority in the Senate. Following a national postal plebiscite, the government legalised same-sex marriage in December 2017.

In foreign affairs, Australia signed a refugee exchange deal with the US in September 2016, allowing those in detention on Manus Island and Nauru to be settled in the US. There was increased tension with China over its policies in the South China Sea, Australia's new laws targeting foreign influence in domestic politics, and a ban, on national security grounds, on Chinese companies supplying Australia's 5G communications network.

In 2017, the United States, Japan, India and Australia agreed to revive the Quadrilateral Security Dialogue in order to counter Chinese ambitions in the South China Sea. Australia signed a modified Trans-Pacific Partnership trade agreement with 10 other nations in March 2018 after the US withdrew from the original agreement.

The government lost five by-elections in July 2018. When, in August, the government made a commitment to meet Australia's emissions target under the Paris Agreement, a number of coalition members rebelled. The controversy harmed the government, which had already lost more than 30 consecutive Newspolls. The parliamentary Liberal Party elected Scott Morrison as its new leader and he was sworn in as prime minister.

==== Morrison government (2018–2022) ====
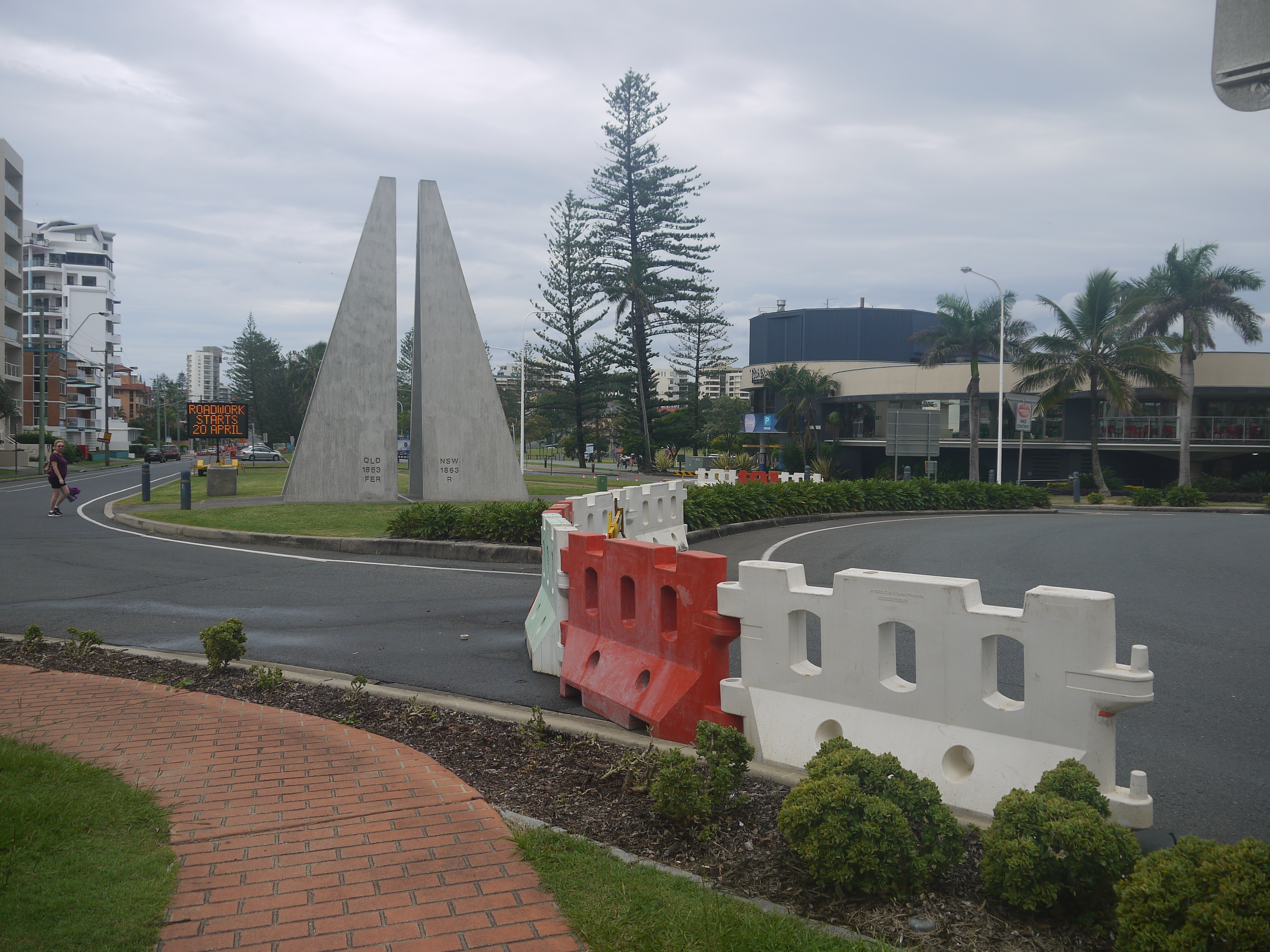
A barricade in Coolangatta enforcing the border closure between Queensland and New South Wales in April 2020 that was implemented by the Queensland Government in response to the COVID-19 pandemic

The Morrison government committed to remaining in the Paris Agreement, but promised a greater focus on reduction of energy prices. In foreign affairs the government signed the Indonesia–Australia Comprehensive Economic Partnership Agreement (IA-CEPA) in March 2019. The government was returned at the elections of May 2019 with a three-seat majority.

In 2017, a convention of 250 Aboriginal and Torres Strait Islander delegates had issued the Uluru Statement from the Heart, calling for constitutional recognition of Indigenous Australians and a "voice to parliament". In 2019, the government announced a process to ensure that Indigenous Australians would be heard at all levels of government.

In 2020, the government was confronted with the world COVID-19 pandemic and the subsequent recession, Australia's first in 29 years. The government banned foreign nationals entering Australia and formed a National Cabinet to address the crisis. The national cabinet announced restrictions on non-essential business, travel and gatherings of people. These restrictions were eased from May, although individual states and territories reimposed restrictions in response to particular outbreaks of COVID-19.

The Australian government made provision for $267 billion in economic stimulus measures, and $16.6 billion in health measures in response to COVID-19. As a result of the COVID-19 recession, the unemployment rate peaked at 7.5 per cent in July 2020 before falling to 5.6 per cent in March 2021.

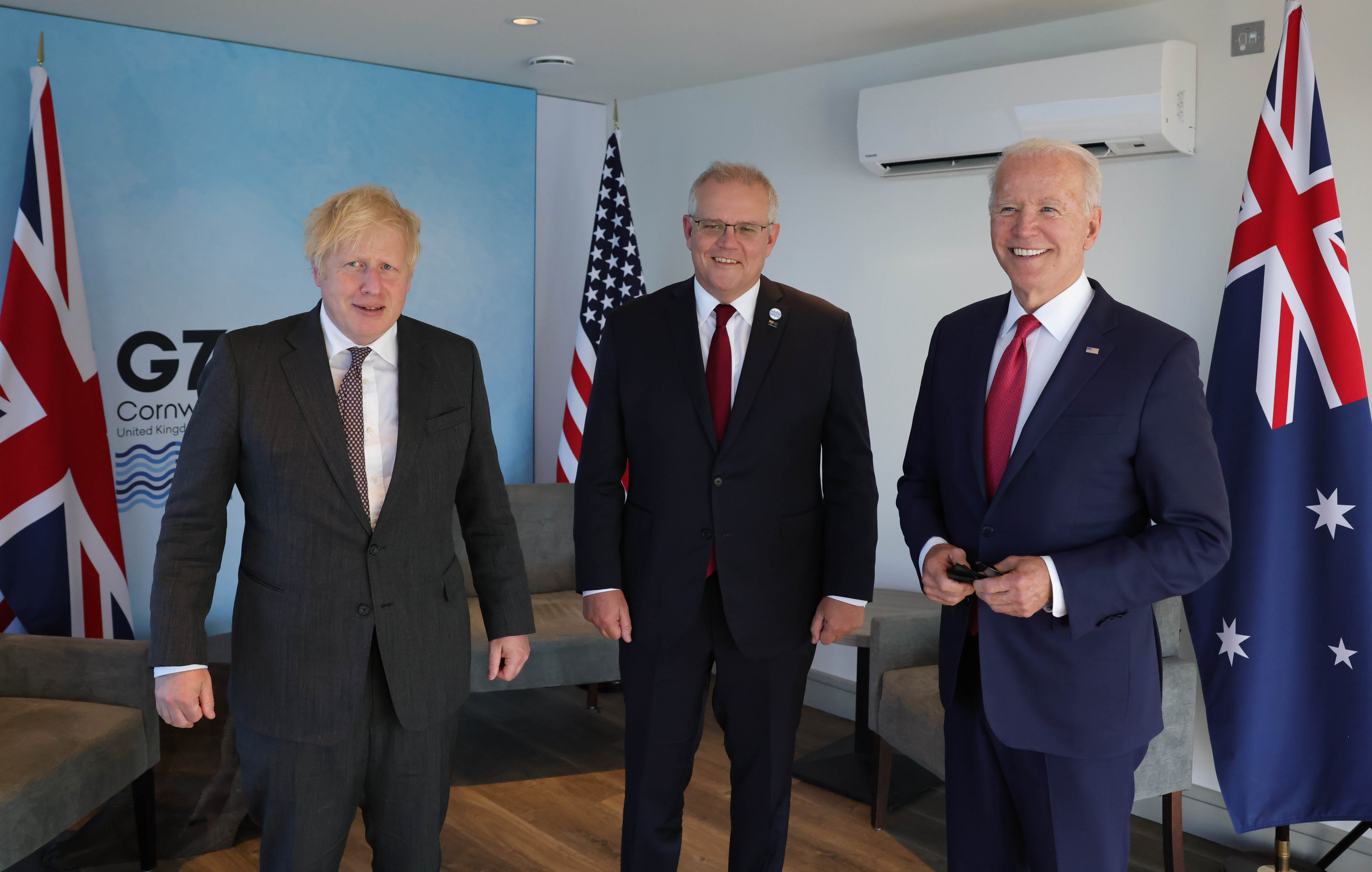
Scott Morrison with fellow AUKUS founders Prime Minister Boris Johnston of the UK and US president Joe Biden.

In June 2021, Australia and the United Kingdom announced that they had struck a preliminary deal on a free-trade agreement. On 16 September 2021, the government announced that Australia, the United Kingdom and the United States had agreed to the creation of an enhanced trilateral security partnership, dubbed AUKUS. The first initiative under AUKUS would be for Australia to acquire nuclear-powered submarine technology. As a result of the agreement, Australia cancelled its 2016 contract for the diesel-electric Attack-class submarine with the French company Naval Group. The decision drew rebukes from China and France.

== Post-pandemic (2022–present) ==
=== Albanese government (2022–present) ===
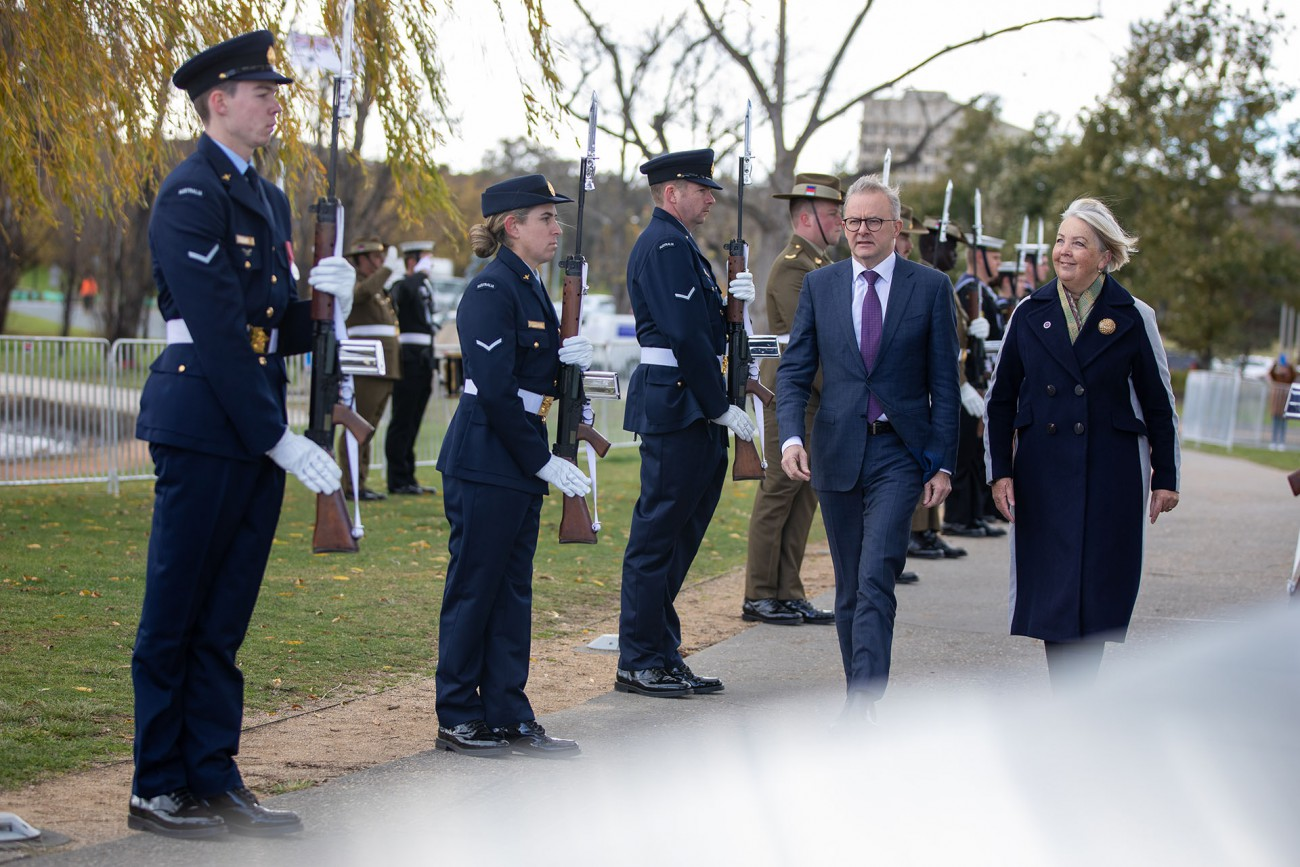
Anthony Albanese, the 31st Prime Minister of Australia reviews the Federation Guard during the Platinum Jubilee of Elizabeth II, 4 June 2022

On 23 May 2022, Anthony Albanese was sworn in as Australia's new prime minister. His Labor Party defeated Scott Morrison's conservative government in the election. Prime Minister Albanese formed Australia's first Labor government in almost a decade.

The global surge in inflation that began in 2021, continued. Australia's inflation rate, which had peaked at 7.8% in late 2022, declined steadily through 2023 and 2024, falling to around 3.3% before edging higher again in late 2025, reaching 3.8% in October.

A referendum on an Indigenous Voice to Parliament was held on 14 October 2023 and was rejected nationally. The Yes23 campaign co-chair Rachel Perkins called for a week of silence "to grieve this outcome and reflect on its meaning and significance".

On 6 October 2025, Australia and Papua New Guinea signed a landmark security and defence cooperation treaty — Australia's first new defence treaty in more than 70 years — aimed at strengthening regional stability, joint military training, and maritime security operations.

== Society and culture (1960s–present) ==
=== Social developments ===
==== Indigenous Australians ====
The 1960s proved a key decade for Indigenous rights in Australia, with the demand for change led by Indigenous activists and organisations such as the Federal Council for the Advancement of Aborigines and Torres Strait Islanders, and embraced by the wider population as citizenship rights were extended.

At the start of the decade, Aboriginal affairs were still regulated by state governments and, in the Northern Territory, by the Australian government. In most states Aboriginal Australians were banned from drinking alcohol and their freedom of association, movement and control of property was restricted. Queensland, Western Australia and the Northern Territory banned Aboriginal people from voting and Queensland and Western Australia controlled their right to marry. Aboriginals were often subjected to unofficial "colour bars" restricting their access to many goods, services and public facilities, especially in country towns.

The official policy of the Australian government and most state governments, however, was the assimilation of Aboriginal people into mainstream culture. In 1962, the Menzies Government's Commonwealth Electoral Act gave Indigenous people the right to vote at federal elections. In 1965, Queensland became the last state to confer state voting rights on Aboriginal people.

In 1963, the Yolngu people of Arnhem Land sent a bark petition to the Australian parliament asking for recognition of their traditional land rights. They subsequently took their case to the Supreme Court of the Northern Territory which ruled against them in September 1971. In 1965, Charles Perkins, helped organise freedom rides into parts of Australia to expose discrimination and inequality. In 1966, the Gurindji people of Wave Hill station commenced the Gurindji strike in a quest for equal pay and recognition of land rights.

In 1966, the Australian government gave Aboriginal people the same rights to social security benefits as other Australians. A 1967 referendum changed the Australian constitution to include all Aboriginal Australians in the national census and allow the Federal parliament to legislate on their behalf. A Council for Aboriginal Affairs was established.

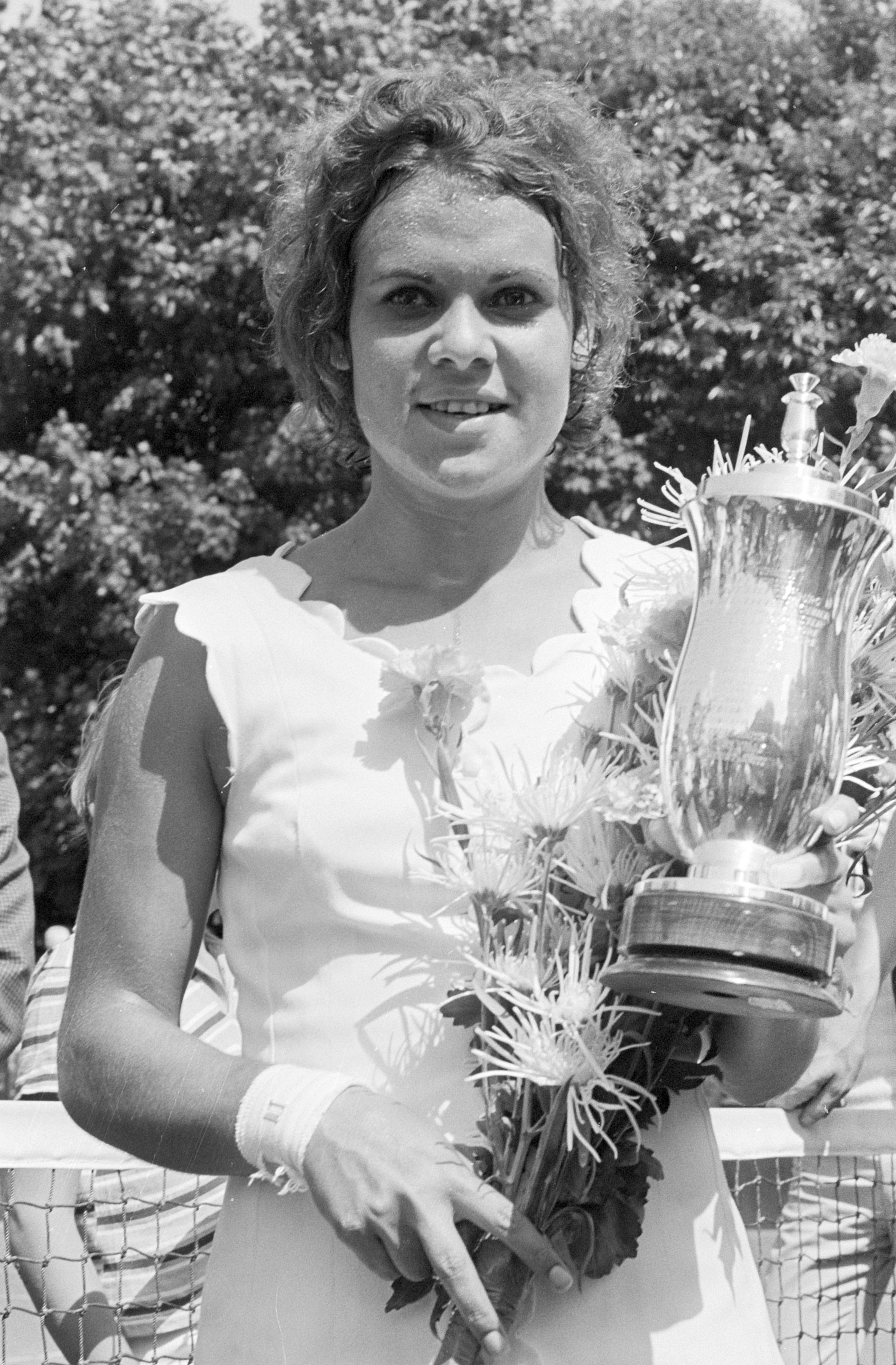
Tennis No. 1 Evonne Goolagong was 1971 Australian of the Year

Popular acclaim for Aboriginal artists, sportspeople and musicians also grew over the period. In 1968, boxer Lionel Rose was proclaimed Australian of the Year. That same year, artist Albert Namatjira was honoured with a postage stamp. Singer-songwriter Jimmy Little's 1963 Gospel song "Royal Telephone" was the first No.1 hit by an Aboriginal artist. Women's Tennis World No. 1 Evonne Goolagong Cawley was celebrated as Australian of the Year in 1971.

Neville Bonner was appointed Liberal Senator for QLD in 1971, becoming the first federal parliamentarian to identify as Aboriginal. Eric Deeral (QLD) and Hyacinth Tungutalum (NT) followed at a state and territory level in 1974. In 1976, Sir Doug Nicholls was appointed Governor of South Australia, the first indigenous Australian to hold vice-regal office. By the 2020s, Aboriginal representation in the federal parliament had exceeded the proportion of Aboriginal people in the general population, and Australia had its first Aboriginal leader of a state or territory in 2016, when the Country Liberal Party's Adam Giles became Chief Minister of the Northern Territory.

In January 1972, Aboriginal activists erected an Aboriginal "tent embassy" on the lawns of parliament house, Canberra and issued a number demands including land rights, compensation for past loss of land and self-determination. The leader of the opposition Gough Whitlam was among those who visited the tent embassy to discuss their demands.

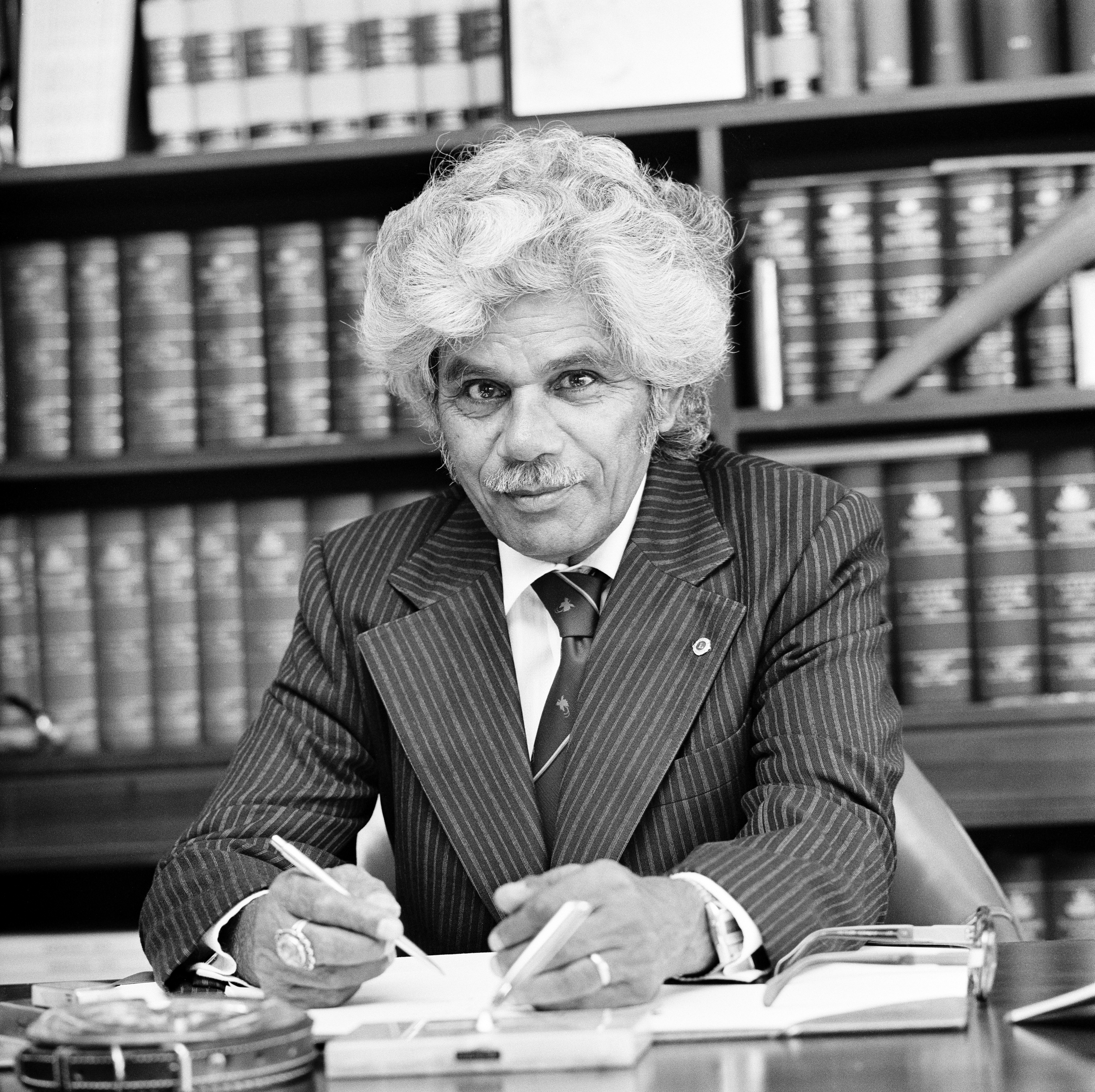
Liberal Senator Neville Bonner, the first federal parliamentarian to identify as Aboriginal, joined the Senate in 1971

The Whitlam government came to power in December 1972 with a policy of self-determination for Aboriginal people. The government also passed legislation against racial discrimination and established a Royal Commission into land rights in the Northern Territory, which formed the basis for the Fraser government's Aboriginal Land Rights Act 1976.

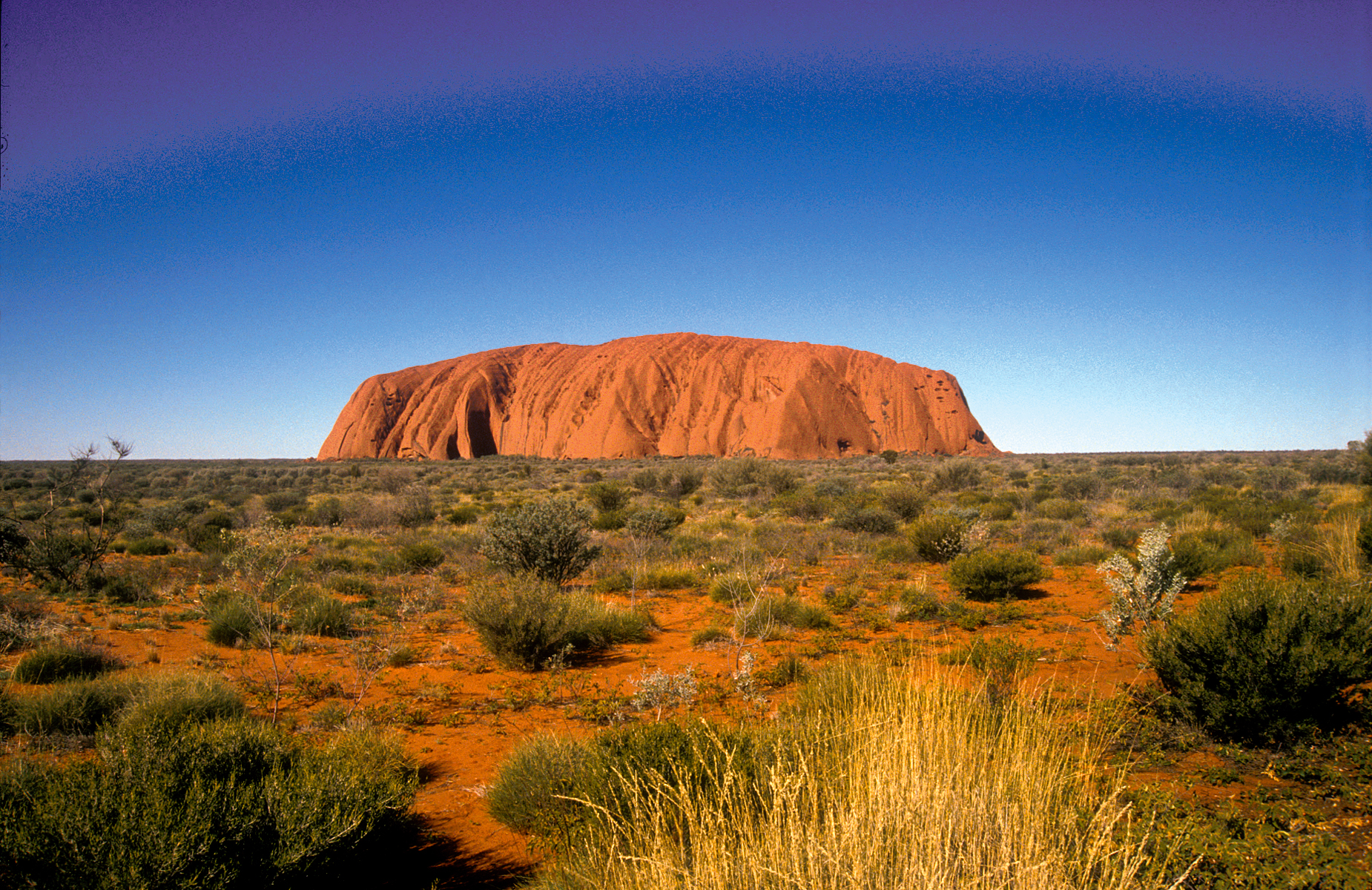
Uluru: returned to traditional owners in 1985

Following this, some states introduced their own land rights legislation; however, there were significant limitations on the returned lands, or that available for claim. In 1985, the Hawke government handed over Uluru (Ayers Rock) to traditional owners with a lease back to the Commonwealth.

In 1992, the High Court of Australia handed down its decision in the Mabo Case, holding that Indigenous native title survived reception of English law and continued to exist unless extinguished by conflicting law or interests in land. The Keating government passed a Native Title Act in 1993 to regulate native title claims and established a Native Title Tribunal to hear those claims. In the subsequent Wik decision of 1996, the High Court found that a pastoral lease did not necessarily extinguish native title. In response, the Howard government amended the Native Title Act to provide better protection for pastoralists and others with an interest in land. By March 2019 the Native Titles Tribunal had determined that 375 Indigenous communities had established native title over 39 per cent of the Australian continent, with one third under exclusive title.

From 1960 the Indigenous population grew faster than the Australian population as a whole. The Aboriginal population was 106,000 in 1961 (1 per cent of the total population) but by 2016 had grown to 786,900 (3 per cent of the population) with a third living in major cities. Despite the drift to large cities, the period from 1965 to 1980 also saw a movement of Indigenous Australians away from towns and settlements to small outstations (or homelands), particularly in Arnhem Land and Central Australia. The movement to outstations was associated with a wider trend for the revival of traditional culture. However, the expense of providing infrastructure to small remote communities has seen pressure from federal, state and territory governments to redirect funding towards larger Indigenous communities.

From 1971 to 2006, indicators for Indigenous employment, median incomes, home ownership, education and life expectancy all improved, although they remained well below the level for those who were not indigenous. High rates of Indigenous incarceration and deaths in custody were highlighted by the report of the Royal Commission into Aboriginal Deaths in Custody in April 1991. The Keating government responded with $400 million in new spending to address some of the recommendations of the report. However, by 2001 Indigenous incarceration rates and deaths in custody had increased. Deaths in custody continued at an average of 15 per year during the decade to 2018.

Richard Broome has concluded: "To close the gap [between Indigenous and other Australians] on inequality and well being will take many years; some despairingly say generations. Compensation for lost wages, for missing out on native title settlements and for being removed from one's family and kin remain unresolved."

==== Women ====
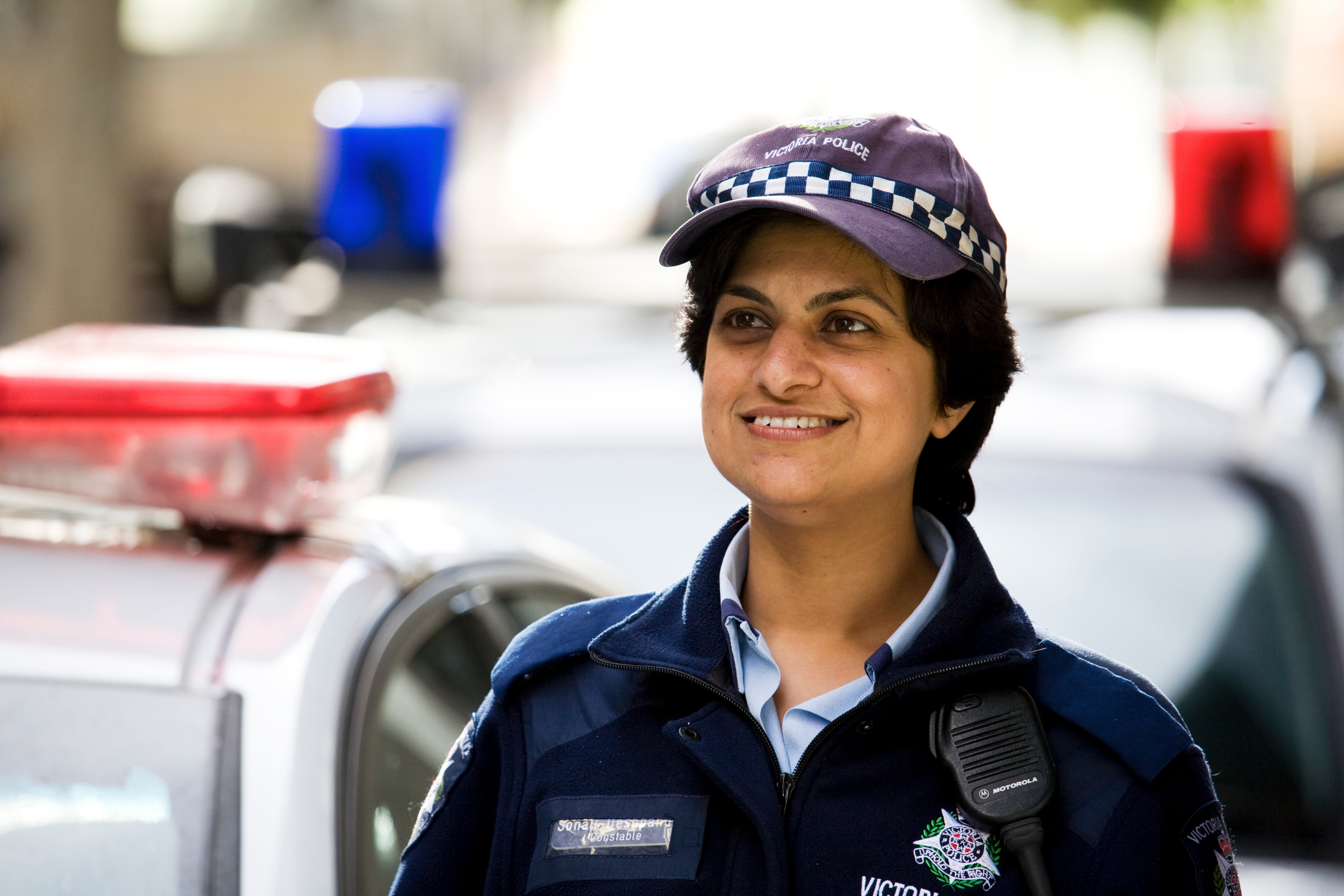
A female police officer in 2008

Holmes and Pinto point out that in 1960 domesticity and motherhood were still the dominant conceptions of femininity. In 1961, women made up only 25 per cent of employed adults and twice as many women described their occupation as "home duties" compared with those in paid employment. The fertility rate fell from a post-war high of 3.5 to less than 2 in the 1970s and 1980s.

The reforming drive of the 1960s and the increasing influence of the women's movement led to a series of legislative and institutional changes. These included the abolition of the "marriage bar" in the Australian public service in 1966, the Arbitration Commission's equal pay decisions of 1969 and 1972, the introduction of paid maternity leave in the Australian public service in 1973, and the enactment of the federal Sex Discrimination Act in 1984 and the Affirmative Action Act of 1986.

Single mothers' benefits were introduced in 1973 and the Family Law Act 1975 bought in no-fault divorce. From the 1980s there was an increase in government funding of women's refuges, health centres, rape crisis centres and information services. The Australian government began funding child care with the Child Care Act of 1972, although state, territory and local government were still the main providers of funding. In 1984, the Australian government introduced standardised fee relief for child care, and funding was greatly expanded in 1990 by the decision to extend fee relief to commercial child care centres.

According to Holmes and Pinto, reliable birth control, increased employment opportunities, and improved family welfare and childcare provision increased opportunities for women outside motherhood and domesticity. In 2019–20, women were more likely than men to hold a bachelor's degree or higher qualification. 68 per cent of women aged 20–74 years old participated in the labour force, compared with 78 per cent of men. However, 43 per cent of employed women were working part-time, compared with 16 per cent of men, and the average earnings of women working full-time was 14 per cent below that of men.

In the five-to-ten years to 2020, the number of women in private sector leadership roles, female federal Justices and Judges, and federal parliamentarians have all increased gradually. However, between 1999 and 2021, Australia has fallen from ninth to 50th in the Inter-Parliamentary Union's ranking of countries by women's representation in national parliaments.

==== Migrants and cultural diversity ====
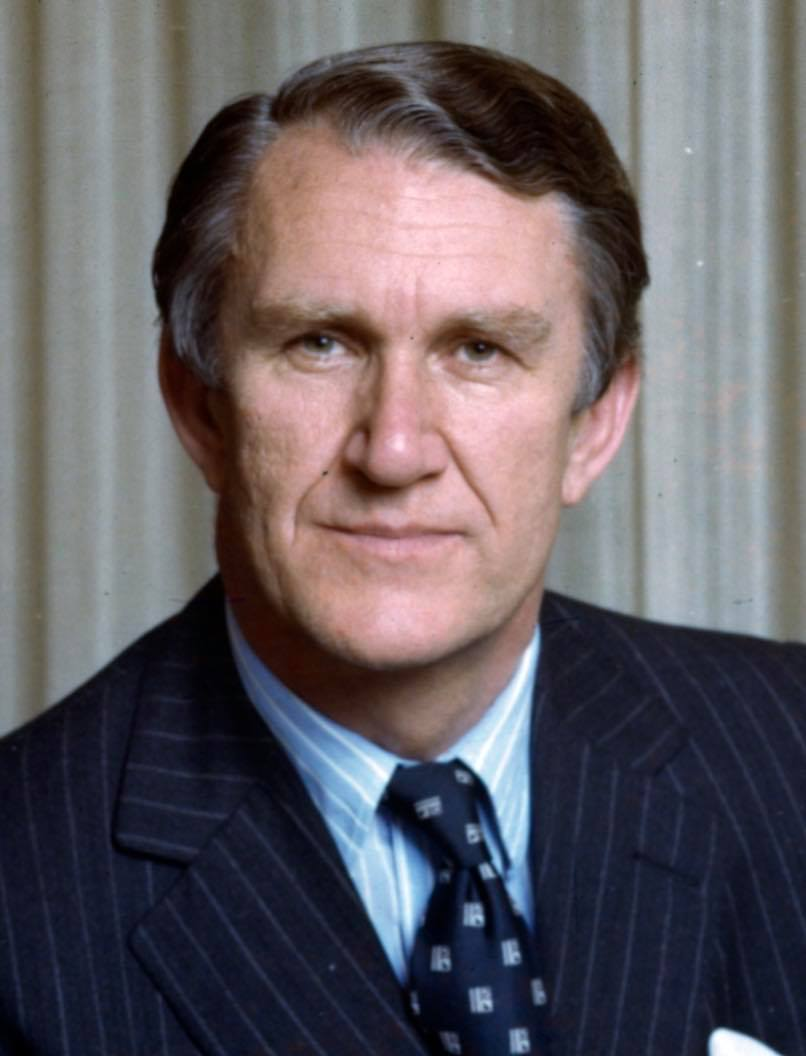
Malcolm Fraser: Committed to a multicultural Australia

In 1961, just over 90 per cent of the Australian population had been born in Australia, New Zealand, the UK or Ireland. Another eight per cent had been born in continental Europe. The White Australia policy was in force and migrants were expected to assimilate into the Australian way of life. As the White Australia policy was gradually dismantled in the 1960s and formally abolished in 1973, governments developed a policy of multiculturalism to manage Australia's increasing cultural diversity. In August 1973 Labor's immigration minister Al Grassby announced his vision of A Multi‐Cultural Society for the Future and a policy of cultural pluralism based on principles of social cohesion, equality of opportunity and cultural identity soon gained bipartisan support. The Galbally Report on migrant services in 1978 recommended that: "every person should be able to maintain his or her culture without prejudice or disadvantage and should be encouraged to understand and embrace other cultures." In response to the report, the Fraser government expanded funding for settlement services, established the Australian Institute of Multicultural Affairs (AIMA), funded multicultural and community language education programs in schools and established the multi-lingual Special Broadcasting Service (SBS). State and territory government programs to support multiculturalism followed.

By the late 1980s Australia had a high migrant intake which included significant numbers of new arrivals from Asian and Middle‐Eastern countries, leading to public debate on immigration policy. In 1984, the historian Geoffrey Blainey called for a reduction in Asian immigration in the interests of social cohesion. In 1988, the opposition Leader, John Howard called for the abandonment of multiculturalism, a reduction in Asian immigration, and a focus on 'One Australia'. In the same year, the government's FitzGerald review of immigration recommended a sharper economic focus in the selection of immigrants. In 1989, the Hawke government released its National Agenda for a Multicultural Australia which endorsed respect for cultural diversity and the need for settlement services, but indicated that pluralism was limited by the need for "an overriding and unifying commitment to Australia".

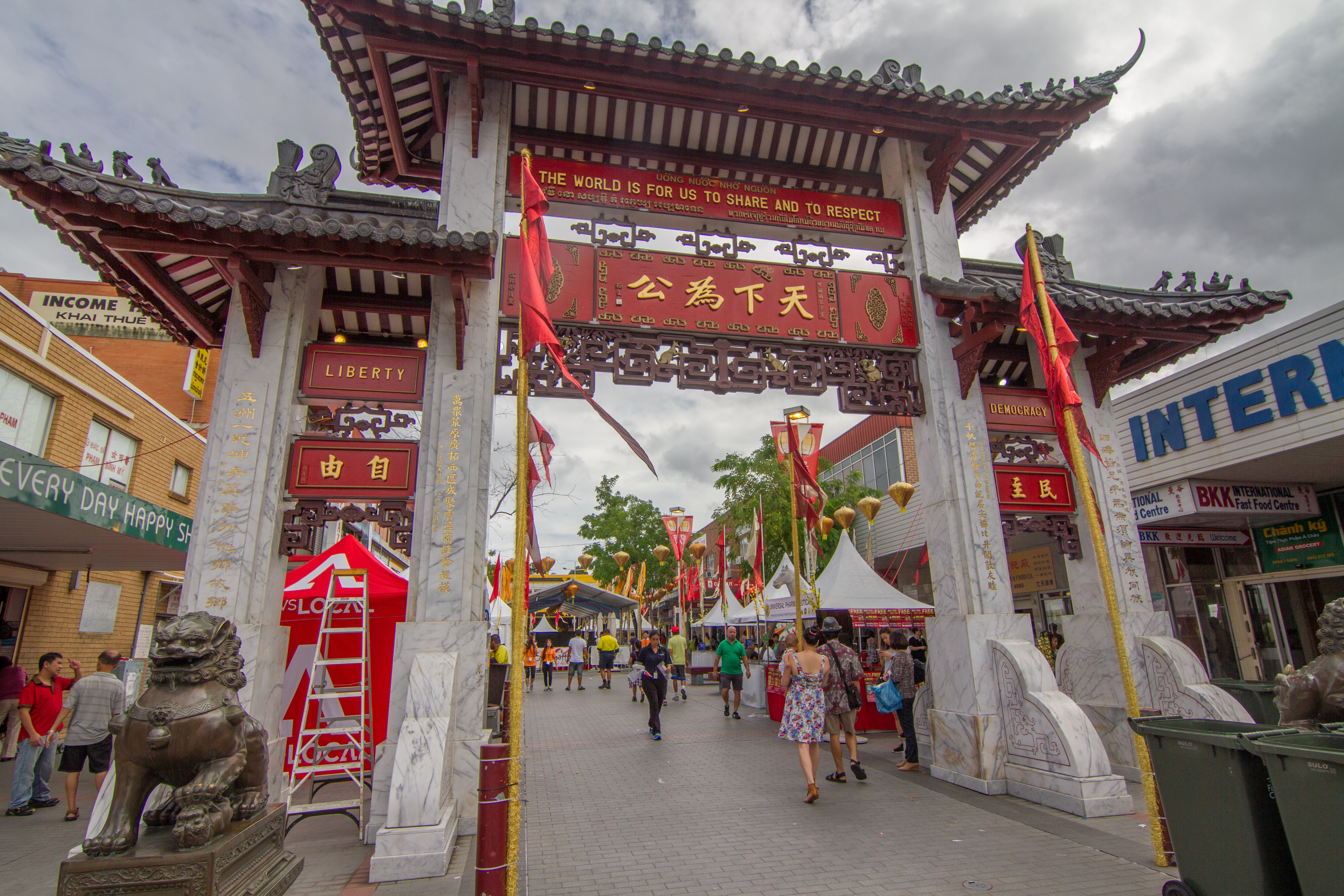
The Pai Lau Gate in the ethnically diverse suburb of Cabramatta in Sydney

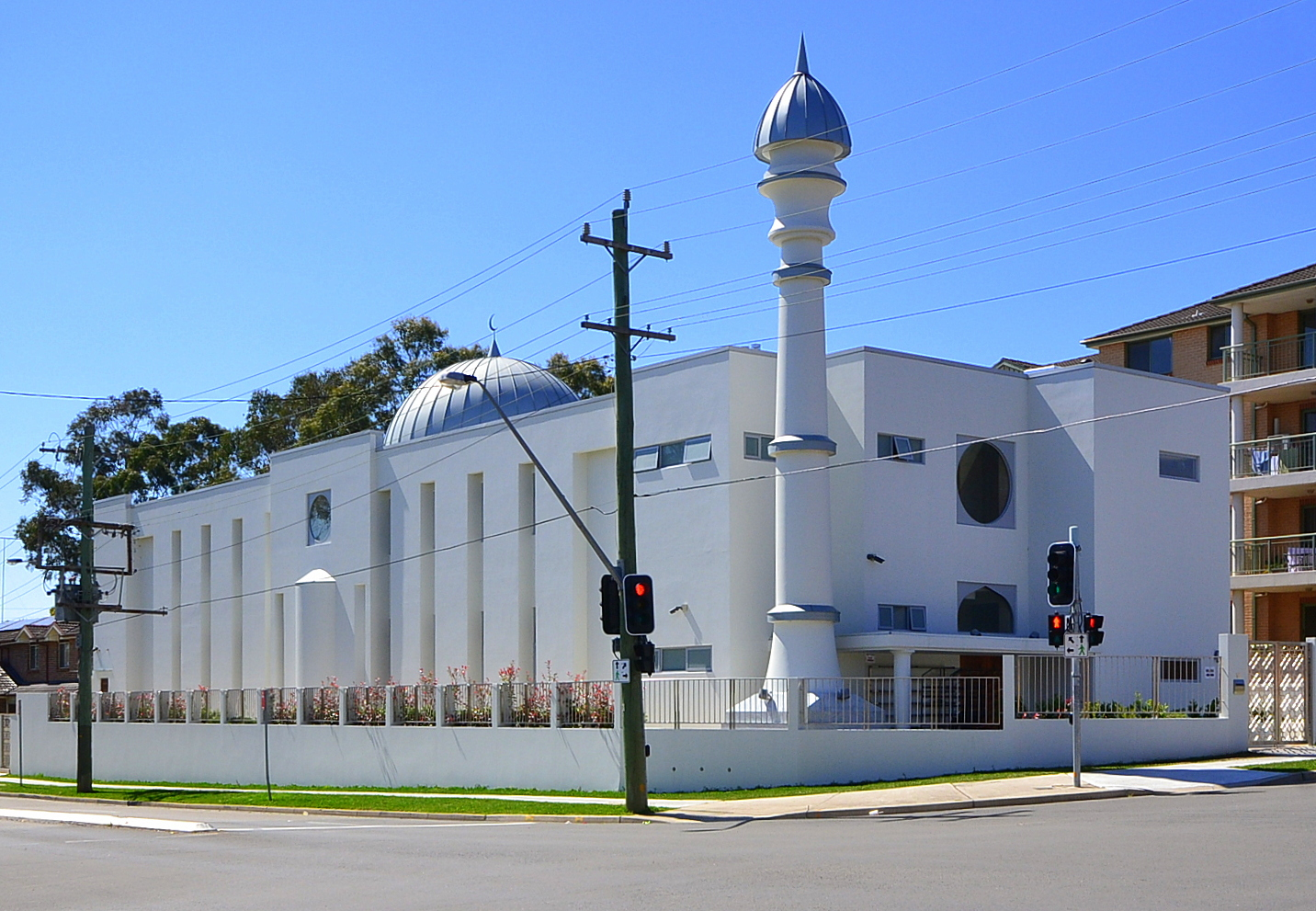
A mosque in Blacktown

Multicultural programs continued to expand between 1986 and 1996 with an emphasis on addressing disadvantage in migrant communities as well as settlement services for recent migrants. James Walter argues that the Hawke and Keating governments (1983–96) also promoted high migration as a means of improving Australia's competitive advantage in a globalised market.

In 1996, Pauline Hanson, a newly elected independent member of parliament, called for a cut in Asian immigration and an end to multiculturalism. In 1998, her One Nation Party gained 23 per cent of the vote in the Queensland elections. The Howard government (1996 to 2007) initially abolished a number of multicultural agencies and reduced funding to some migrant services as part of a general program of budget cuts. In 1999, the government adopted a policy of "Australian multiculturalism" with an emphasis on citizenship and adherence to "Australian values".

Following 11 September 2001 terrorist attacks in the US, the Bali bombings and other terrorist incidents, some media and political commentary sought to link terrorism with Islam. In 2004, the Human Rights and Equal Opportunity Commission (HREOC) reported an increase in vilification and violence against Australian Muslims and some other minority ethnic groups. The government increased funding for multicultural, citizenship and settlement programs, with an emphasis on the promotion of social cohesion and security. The annual immigration intake also increased substantially as the economy boomed, from 67,900 in 1998–99 to 148,200 in 2006–07. The proportion of migrants selected for their skills increased from 30 per cent in 1995–96 to 68 per cent in 2006–07.

Immigration continued to grow under the Labor government (2007–13) with prime minister Kevin Rudd proclaiming a "big Australia" policy. The immigration intake averaged around 190,000 a year from 2011–12 to 2015–16, a level based on research indicating the optimum level to increase economic output per head of population. India and China became the largest source countries of new migrants. The immigration intake was reduced to 160,000 in 2018–19 as some State governments complained that high immigration was adding to urban congestion. The opposition also linked high immigration with low wages growth while the One Nation party continued to oppose high immigration while proclaiming: "It's okay to be white.".

By 2020, 30 per cent of the Australian population were born overseas. The top five countries of birth for those born overseas were England, China, India, New Zealand and the Philippines. Australia's population encompassed migrants born in almost every country in the world.

=== Arts and culture ===
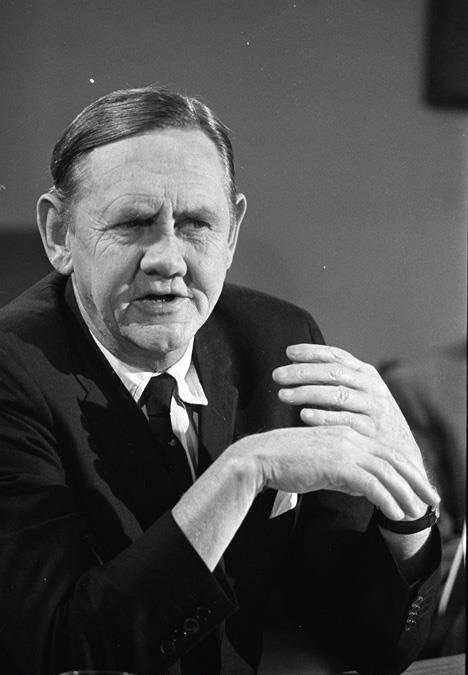
John Gorton in 1970. As Prime Minister, Gorton revitalised government support for Australian cinema

The 1960s and 1970s saw increased government support for the arts and the flourishing of distinctively Australian artistic works. The Gorton government (1968–71) established the Australian Council for the Arts, the Australian Film Development Corporation (AFDC) and the National Film and Television Training School. The Whitlam government (1972–75) established the Australia Council with funding to promote crafts, Aboriginal arts, literature, music, visual arts, theatre, film and television.

In 1966, a television drama quota was introduced requiring broadcasters to show 30 minutes of locally produced drama each week. The police series Homicide (1964–67) became the highest rating program and the family drama Skippy the Bush Kangaroo became a local and international success. By 1969 eight of the twelve most popular television programs were Australian. With these successes, locally produced dramas became a staple of Australian television in the 1970s and 1980s. Notable examples include Rush (1973–76), The Sullivans (1976–83) and Neighbours (1985–present).

From the late 1960s a "new wave" of Australian theatre emerged, initially centred on small theatre groups such as the Pram Factory, La Mama and the Australian Performing Group in Melbourne and the Jane Street Theatre and Nimrod Theatre Company in Sydney. Playwrights associated with the new wave included David Williamson, Alex Buzo, Jack Hibberd and John Romeril. Features of the new wave were the extensive use of Australian colloquial speech (including obscenities), the exploration of the Australian identity, and the critique of cultural myths. By the end of the 1970s new Australian plays were a feature of small and large theatre companies in most states.

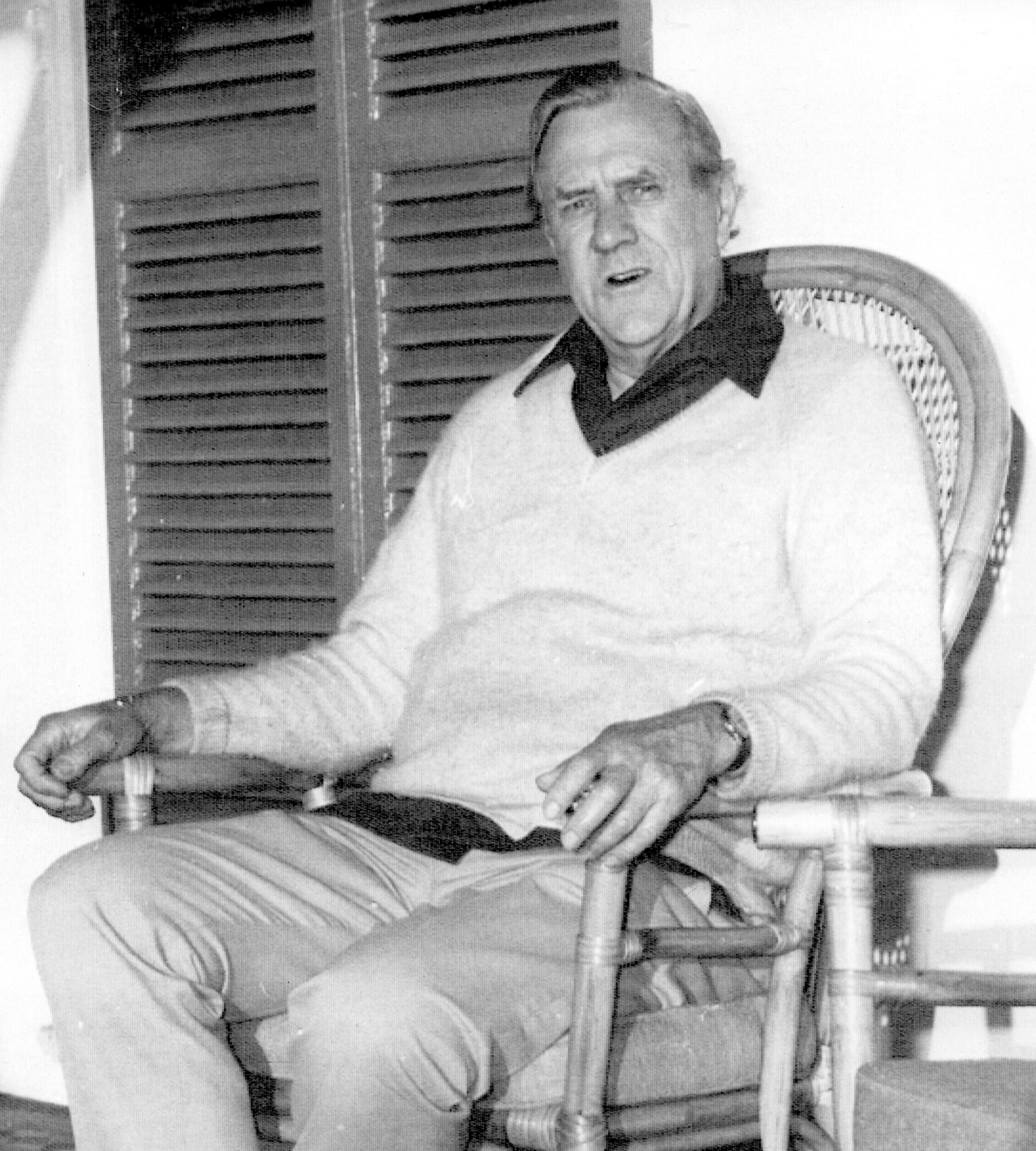
Patrick White: In 1973, became the first Australian to win a Nobel Prize in Literature

Support through the AFDC (from 1975 the Australian Film Commission) and state funding bodies, and generous tax concessions for investors introduced in 1981, led to a large increase in Australian produced films. Almost 400 were produced between 1970 and 1985. Notable films include The Adventures of Barry McKenzie (1972), Picnic at Hanging Rock (1975), My Brilliant Career (1979), Breaker Morant (1980), Gallipoli (1981), the Mad Max trilogy (1979–85) and Crocodile Dundee (1986).

In 1973, Patrick White became the first Australian to win a Nobel Prize for Literature. While there were only around twenty Australian novels published in 1973, this had grown to around 300 in 1988. By 1985 more than 1,000 writers had received grants and more than 1,000 books had been subsidised by the Literature Board. Writers who published their first book between 1975 and 1985 include Peter Carey, David Malouf, Murray Bail, Elizabeth Jolley, Helen Garner and Tim Winton.

There was also a growing recognition of Indigenous cultural movements. In the early 1970s Aboriginal elders at Papunya began using acrylic paints to make "dot" paintings based on the traditional Honey Ant Dreaming. Indigenous artists from other regions also developed distinctive styles based on a fusion of modern art materials and traditional stories and iconography. Indigenous writers such as Oodgeroo Noonuccal (Kath Walker), Jack Davis and Kevin Gilbert produced significant work in the 1970s and 1980s. A National Black Theatre was established in Sydney in the early 1970s. The Aboriginal Islander Dance Theatre was established in 1976 and the Bangarra Dance Theatre in 1989. In 1991, the rock band Yothu Yindi, which drew on traditional Aboriginal music and dance, achieved commercial and critical success.

In music, ABC television's popular music show Countdown (1974–87) helped promote Australian music while radio station 2JJ (later JJJ) in Sydney promoted live performances and recordings by Australian independent artists and record labels.

Carter and Griffen-Foley state that by the end of the 1970s: "There was a widely shared sense of Australian culture as independent, no longer troubled by its relationship with Britain." However, by 1990 commentators as diverse as P. P. McGuiness and Geoffrey Serle were complaining that the large increase in artistic works had led to the celebration of mediocrity. Poet Chris Wallace-Crabbe questioned whether Australia had overcome its former "cultural cringe" only to fall into cultural overconfidence.

In the new millennium, the globalisation of the Australian economy and society, and developments in jet travel and the internet have largely overcome the "tyranny of distance" which had influenced Australian arts and culture. Overseas cultural works could be more readily accessed in person or virtually. Australian performers such as the Australian Ballet and Australian Chamber Orchestra frequently toured abroad. The growing number of international art exhibitions, such as Art Basel Hong Kong and the Queensland Art Gallery's Asia-Pacific Triennial of Contemporary Art, have increased the exposure of Australian art in the region and the wider global market.

In film, the number of Australian productions averaged 14 per year in the 1970s but grew to 31 per year in the 2000s and 37 per year in the 2010s. A number of Australian directors and actors, including Baz Luhrmann, George Miller, Peter Weir, Cate Blanchett, Nicole Kidman, Geoffrey Rush and others, have been able to establish careers both in Australia and abroad. The technical expertise developed in the Australian industry, and the increasing number of internationally successful Australian directors and actors, encouraged foreign producers to make more films in Australia. Major international productions made in Australia in the past decade include Mad Max: Fury Road and The Great Gatsby.

Carter and Griffen-Follet conclude: "Australia is no longer a Dominion or client state within a closed imperial market, but a medium-sized player, exporter as well as importer, within globalised cultural industries and markets."

== Historiography ==
The first Australian histories, such as those by William Wentworth and James Macarthur, were written to influence public opinion and British policy in the colony. After the Australian colonies became self-governing in the 1850s, colonial governments commissioned histories aimed at promoting migration and investment from Britain. The beginning of professional academic history in Australian universities from 1891 saw the dominance of an Imperial framework for interpreting Australian history, in which Australia emerged from the successful transfer of people, institutions, and culture from Britain. Typical of the imperial school of Australian history was the Australian volume of the Cambridge History of the British Empire published in 1933.

Military history received government support after the First World War, most prominently with Charles Bean's 12 volume History of Australia in the War of 1914–1918 (1921–42). Bean's earlier work as Australia's official war correspondent had helped establish the Anzac legend which, according to McKenna: "immediately supplanted all other narratives of nationhood – the march of the explorers, the advance of settlement, Eureka, Federation and Australia's record of progressive democratic legislation."

Radical nationalist interpretations of Australian history became more prominent from the 1930s. Brian Fitzpatrick published a series of histories from 1939 to 1941 which sought to demonstrate the exploitative nature of Britain's economic relationship with Australia and the role of the labour movement in a struggle for social justice and economic independence. Russel Ward's The Australian Legend (1958) sought to trace the origins of a distinctive democratic national ethos from the experiences of the convicts, bushrangers, gold-diggers, drovers and shearers. In the 1960s, Marxist historians such as Bob Gollan and Ian Turner explored the relationship of the labour movement to radical nationalist politics.

Donald Horne's The Lucky Country (1964) is a critique of a "dull and provincial" Australia that gets by on its abundance of natural resources. The book's title has been constantly misinterpreted since the book was published.

In the first two volumes of his History of Australia (1962, 1968) Manning Clark developed an idiosyncratic interpretation of Australian history telling the story of "epic tragedy" in which "the explorers, Governors, improvers, and perturbators vainly endeavoured to impose their received schemes of redemption on an alien, intractable setting". Donald Horne's The Lucky Country (1964) was scathing in its observations of a complacent, dull, anti-intellectual and provincial Australia, with a swollen suburbia and absence of innovation. Geoffrey Blainey's The Tyranny of Distance (1966) argued that Australia's distance from Britain had shaped its history and identity.

Humphrey McQueen's A New Britannia (1970) attacked radical nationalist historical narratives from a Marxist New Left perspective. Anne Summers in Damned Whores and God's Police (1975) and Miriam Dixson in The Real Matilda (1976) analysed the role of women in Australian history. Others explored the history of those marginalised because of their sexuality or ethnicity. Oral histories, such as Wendy Lowenstein's Weevils in the Flour (1978) became more prominent.

From the 1970s, histories of the Aboriginal–settler relationship became prominent. Charles Rowley's The Destruction of Aboriginal Society (1970), Henry Reynolds' The Other Side of the Frontier (1981) and Peter Reid's work on the "stolen generations" of Aboriginal children are notable.

Post-structuralist ideas on the relationship between language and meaning were influential in the 1980s and 1990s, for example, in Greg Dening's Mr Bligh's Bad Language (1992). Memory studies and Pierre Nora's ideas on the relationship between memory and history influenced work in a number of fields including military history, ethnographic history, oral history and historical work in Australian museums. Interdisciplinary histories drawing on the insights of fields such as sociology, anthropology, cultural studies and environmental studies have become more common since the 1980s. Transnational approaches which analyse Australian history in a global and regional context have also flourished in recent decades.

In the 21st century, most historical works are not created by academic historians, and public conceptions of Australia's history are more likely to be shaped by popular histories, historical fiction and drama, the media, the internet, museums and public institutions. Popular histories by amateur historians regularly outsell work by academic historians. Local histories and family histories have proliferated in recent decades.

== See also ==
- Outline of Australia
- History of Australia (1788–1850)
- History of Australia (1851–1900)
- History of Australia (1901–1945)
- History of Australia (1945–present)
- History of Australia (1901–1945)
- History of the Australian Capital Territory
- History of New South Wales
- History of the Northern Territory
- History of Queensland
- History of South Australia
- History of Tasmania
- History of Victoria
- History of Western Australia
- Diplomatic history of Australia
- Australian archaeology
- Economic history of Australia
- History of broadcasting#Australia
- History of monarchy in Australia
- Immigration history of Australia
- LGBTQ history in Australia
- List of conflicts in Australia
- List of towns and cities in Australia by year of foundation
- Military history of Australia
  - Military history of Australia during World War I
  - Military history of Australia during World War II
- Peace movements in Australia
- Territorial evolution of Australia
- Timeline of Australian history
- Whaling in Australia
- Women in Australia
