= Labour History (journal) =

Australian journal of labour history

- Discipline: Labour history
- Language: English
- Edited by: Diane Kirkby

Publication details
- Former name: Bulletin of the Australian Society for the Study of Labour History
- History: 1962–present
- Publisher: Australian Society for the Study of Labour History and Liverpool University Press
- Frequency: Biannual

Standard abbreviations
- ISO 4: Labour Hist.

Indexing
- ISSN: 0023-6942
- OCLC no.: 52163034

Links
- Journal homepage; Online access

Labour History: A Journal of Labour and Social History is a peer-review academic journal of labour history in Australasia. The journal was established in 1962 as the Bulletin of the Australian Society for the Study of Labour History by the Australian Society for the Study of Labour History (ASSLH), but was renamed Labour History in 1963. The ASSLH published the journal until 2018, after which the Society joined with Liverpool University Press. The journal is edited by Diane Kirkby (La Trobe University).

== Labour History Editors ==
- Nos 1-3 (January-November 1962) – Eric Fry
- Nos 4-5 (May-November 1963) – Bob Gollan and B.D. Shields
- No. 6 (May 1964) – E.C. Fry; J.S. Hagan; B.J. MacFarlane; B.D. Shields
- No. 7 (November 1964) – E.C. Fry; J.S. Hagan; B.J. MacFarlane; J. Merritt
- No. 8 (May 1965) – R.A Gollan; J.S. Hagan; B.J. McFarlane
- Nos 9-10 (November 1965-May 1966) – B.J. McFarlane; E.C. Fry; J.S. Hagan
- Nos 11-14 (November 1966-May 1968) – B.J. McFarlane; N. Bede Nairn; Robert Cooksey
- Nos 15-16 (November 1968-May 1969) – B.J. McFarlane; J. Molony; N. Bede Nairn; Robert Cooksey
- No. 18 (May 1970) – J.D. Ritchie; J. Molony; N. Bede Nairn; G. Osborne
- Nos 19-22 (November 1970-May 1972) – J.D. Ritchie
- No. 23 (November 1972) – Jill Waterhouse
- No. 24 (May 1973) – special edition Strikes: Studies in Twentieth Century Australian Social History – J. Iremonger; J. Merritt; G. Osborne
- Nos 25-8 (November 1973-May 1975) – David Walker
- No. 29 (November 1975) – special edition Women at Work – Ann Curthoys; Susan Eade; and Peter Spearritt
- Nos 30-43 (May 1976-November 1977-November 1982) – John Merritt
- No. 44 (May 1983) – Susan Allen
- Nos 45-49 (November 1983-November 1985) – John Merritt
- No. 50 (May 1986) – John Merritt; John Knott
- Nos 51-57 (November 1986-November 1989) – Ken Buckley
- Nos 58-72 (May 1990-November 1998) – Terry Irving
- Nos 76-99 (May 1999-November 2010) – Greg Patmore
- No. 100 (May 2011) – John Shields (with Cathy Brigden, Greg Patmore, Nikki Balnave, Lucy Taksa)
- Nos 101-110 (November 2011-May 2016) – John Shields
- Nos 111- (November 2016-current) – Diane Kirkby

== Special Issues ==
No. 17 (November 1969) – The Great Depression in Australia – Robert Cooksey

Not numbered (1978) 'Jack Lang' – Heather Radi; Peter Spearritt

No. 35 (November 1978) 'Who are our enemies? Racism and the working class in Australia' – Ann Curthoys; Andrew Markus

Not numbered (1978) 'Labour in Conflict: The 1949 Coal Strike' – Phillip Deery

No. 61 (November 1991) 'Women, Work, and the Labour Movement in Australia and Aotearoa/New Zealand' – Raelene Frances; Bruce Scates

No. 69 (November 1995) 'Aboriginal Workers' – Ann McGrath; Kay Saunders; Jackie Huggins

No. 71 (November 1996) Comparative Labour History: Australia and Canada, Labour/Le Travail – Greg Kealey; Greg Patmore

No. 106 (May 2014) 'Labour and the Great War: The Australian Working Class and the Making of ANZAC' – Frank Bongiorno, Raelene Frances, Bruce Scates

== Indexing and abstracting ==
The journal is indexed and abstracted in the following bibliographic databases:

- America: History and Life
- Historical Abstracts
- International Bibliography of the Social Sciences
- Modern Language Association Database
- Periodicals Index Online
- Scopus
- Social Sciences Citation Index
