= Australian Society for the Study of Labour History =

Australian historical society

The Australian Society for the Study of Labour History (ASSLH) was founded in 1961 to study 'the working class situation ... and social history in the fullest sense'. Founding members included Asa Briggs, Bob Gollan, Eric Fry, and others. Influenced by the work of E.P. Thompson, and the formation of the British Society for the Study of Labour History, they hoped to make labour history 'a popular pursuit, a study, and a part of ordinary people's lives'. The Society has published the journal Labour History since 1962 (now jointly published with Liverpool University Press), with the intention for it to 'be of immediate practical value to the labour movement'. The Society has branches in the ACT, Queensland, South Australia, Victoria, and Western Australia.

== Labour History Editors ==
- Nos 1-3 (January-November 1962) – Eric Fry
- Nos 4-5 (May-November 1963) – Bob Gollan and B.D. Shields
- No. 6 (May 1964) – E.C. Fry; J.S. Hagan; B.J. McFarlane; B.D. Shields
- No. 7 (November 1964) – E.C. Fry; J.S. Hagan; B.J. MacFarlane; J. Merritt
- No. 8 (May 1965) – R.A Gollan; J.S. Hagan; B.J. McFarlane
- Nos 9-10 (November 1965-May 1966) – B.J. McFarlane; E.C. Fry; J.S. Hagan
- Nos 11-14 (November 1966-May 1968) – B.J. McFarlane; N. Bede Nairn; Robert Cooksey
- Nos 15-16 (November 1968-May 1969) – B.J. McFarlane; J. Molony; N. Bede Nairn; Robert Cooksey
- No. 18 (May 1970) – J.D. Ritchie; J. Molony; N. Bede Nairn; G. Osborne
- Nos 19-22 (November 1970-May 1972) – J.D. Ritchie
- No. 23 (November 1972) – Jill Waterhouse
- No. 24 (May 1973) – special edition Strikes: Studies in Twentieth Century Australian Social History – J. Iremonger; J. Merritt; G. Osborne
- Nos 25-8 (November 1973-May 1975) – David Walker
- No. 29 (November 1975) – special edition Women at Work – Ann Curthoys; Susan Eade; and Peter Spearritt
- Nos 30-43 (May 1976-November 1977-November 1982) – John Merritt
- No. 44 (May 1983) – Susan Allen
- Nos 45-49 (November 1983-November 1985) – John Merritt
- No. 50 (May 1986) – John Merritt; John Knott
- Nos 51-57 (November 1986-November 1989) – Ken Buckley
- Nos 58-72 (May 1990-November 1998) – Terry Irving
- Nos 76-99 (May 1999-November 2010) – Greg Patmore
- No. 100 (May 2011) – John Shields (with Cathy Brigden, Greg Patmore, Nikki Balnave, Lucy Taksa)
- Nos 101-110 (November 2011-May 2016) – John Shields
- Nos 111- (November 2016-current) – Diane Kirkby

== Special Issues ==
No. 17 (November 1969) – The Great Depression in Australia – Robert Cooksey

Not numbered (1978) 'Jack Lang' – Heather Radi; Peter Spearritt

No. 35 (November 1978) 'Who are our enemies? Racism and the working class in Australia' – Ann Curthoys; Andrew Markus

Not numbered (1978) 'Labour in Conflict: The 1949 Coal Strike' – Phillip Deery

No. 61 (November 1991) 'Women, Work, and the Labour Movement in Australia and Aotearoa/New Zealand' – Raelene Frances; Bruce Scates

No. 69 (November 1995) 'Aboriginal Workers' – Ann McGrath; Kay Saunders; Jackie Huggins

No. 71 (November 1996) Comparative Labour History: Australia and Canada, Labour/Le Travail – Greg Kealey; Greg Patmore

No. 106 (May 2014) 'Labour and the Great War: The Australian Working Class and the Making of ANZAC' – Frank Bongiorno, Raelene Frances, Bruce Scates
