= Gollan =

Gollan is a surname. Notable people with the name include:

- Alberto Gollán (1918–2014), Argentine television businessman
- Alexander Gollan (1840–1902), British diplomat
- Daniel Gollán (born 1955), Argentine politician and physician
- Daphne Gollan (1918–1999), Australian feminist, historian and activist
- Donald Gollan (1896–1971), British athlete in Olympic rowing
- George Gollan (1886–1957), Australian politician in the New South Wales Legislative Assembly from 1932 until 1953; Chief Secretary of NSW 1938–1939 (United Australia Party, and others)
- Henry Gollan (1868–1949), British lawyer and judge
- John Gollan (1911–1977), General Secretary of the Communist Party of Great Britain
- Robin Gollan (1917–2007), Australian historian
- Roy Gollan (1892–1968), Australian diplomat, mainly in India
- Spencer Gollan (1860–1934), New Zealand-born athlete in rowing, racehorse owner
- William Gollan (1885–1968), Australian politician, member of the NSW Legislative Assembly 1941–1962 (Labor Party)

== See also ==
- Golan (disambiguation)
- Gollan Addison (1877–1935), Australian cricketer
- Gullen (disambiguation)
