= Frank Stilwell (economist) =

Australian political economist (born 1944)

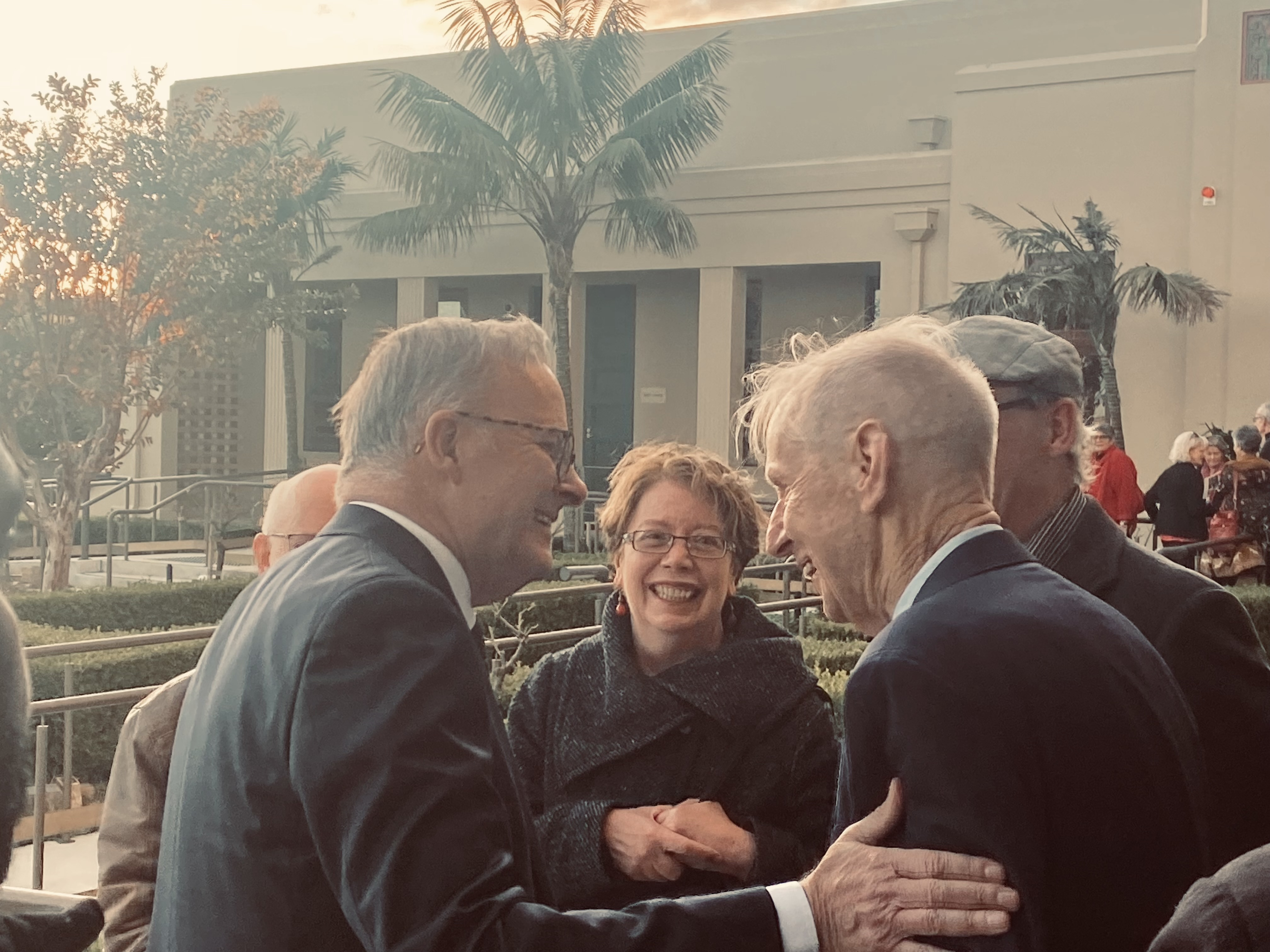
- Frank Stilwell (on the right of picture) being greeted by Australian Prime Minister, Anthony Albanese (left of picture), who was one of his former students in Political Economy at the University of Sydney. (In the centre of the picture, smiling, is Dr Patricia Ranald, a Research Associate in the Political Economy department).
- Born: 1944 (age 81–82); London, England
- Occupations: Professor Emeritus in Political Economy, University of Sydney
- Awards: University of Sydney, Award for Excellence in Teaching; Fellow, Academy of the Social Sciences in Australia

Academic background
- Education: University of Southampton (BSc); University of Reading (PhD)
- Thesis: Regional Development in South East England: Study of Sub-Regions
- Doctoral advisor: John Harry Dunning

Franklin J.B. Stilwell (born 1944) is an Australian political economist and Professor Emeritus. He is known for establishing, with Evan Jones, Gavan Butler, Margaret Power, Debesh Bhattacharya, Geelum Simpson-Lee and Ted Wheelwright, an independent political economy department at the University of Sydney. His research interests include theories of political economy, inequality, urbanization, and regional development, Australian economic policy and the nature of work. His textbooks on the subject are standard teaching material for all university students in Australia studying the field of Political Economy. Stilwell's contribution to heterodox economics makes him a noteworthy figure of the Australian New Left.

== Early life ==
Stilwell was born in London, in 1944. His mother was an infant school teacher, and his father was a clerk in HM Customs and Excise. His father enjoyed local politics and later became mayor of Eastleigh, after the family moved to Hampshire to be near to Southampton docks where he was employed. As Stilwell said in an interview with the Sydney Morning Herald: "[My father] was initially an independent... but he later joined the Conservative Party as a Conservative councillor. That was after the Conservatives threatened to stand a candidate against him ... he was pragmatic until the end." Stilwell completed a bachelor's degree in social sciences at the University of Southampton and a PhD in economics at the University of Reading. He became a lecturer in economics at Reading and taught there for two years before migrating to Australia to become a lecturer in economics at the University of Sydney.

== Disputes within the University of Sydney Economics Department ==
Stilwell arrived at Sydney University in 1970, to an Economics department that was deeply divided on the teaching of the qualitative and quantitative methods in economics. The roots of the dispute were framed by the rise of the new social movements of the late 1960s and the early 1970s, especially: the anti-conscription campaigns surrounding the Vietnam War, the women's movement, the (later) anti-apartheid anti-Springbok demonstration and the black rights protests. Many students were agitating for progressive social change. In politics, the election to government in 1972 of the Australian Labor Party led by Gough Whitlam opened an alternative future for Australian economic governance. The crisis of stagflation and the provision of free tertiary education in Australia also had significantly impacted the political culture of the period. Dissident academic traditions were also being forged in other places too, including at Paris and Berkeley, challenging academic hierarchies; The New Left emerged to challenge the dominance of Orthodox Marxism. Locally, in Sydney, the Green Bans movement showed the capacity for a range of actors, from community activists and trade unionists to coalitions across them, to challenge the dominant power structures. It was in this context of economic, social and political change that the movement to fundamentally challenge orthodox economics education developed.

The economics syllabus at the University of Sydney during the 1960s had been dominated by a mix of microeconomics, macroeconomics (influenced by John Maynard Keynes), and the study of Australian and international economic institutions. Colin Simkin and Warren Hogan were appointed as professors to the Sydney University economics department in 1968–1969 to 'modernise' the program, making the courses more neoclassical theory-heavy, and mathematical. Both academics had been chosen by the Vice-Chancellor Professor Bruce Williams who had previously been Professor of Economics in the UK at Manchester University. They would become the core figures pushing for a mathematical/neoclassical theory-dominated reform. Resistance came from many students and some of the academic staff. Associate Professor Ted Wheelwright wrote to the Vice-Chancellor in 1970, calling for an official enquiry into the department. Several of the academics hired by Hogan and Simkin subsequently aligned themselves with Wheelwright, including: Debesh Bhattacharya, Gavan Butler, Frank Stilwell and Evan Jones. Students complained that their Economics courses were overly abstract and poorly taught. Their animosity was compounded when Paul Samuelson, arguably the most influential economist of the period, came to Sydney: his public lecture at the university was on a topic in mathematical economics that was met with dismay by most of the students and the lecture theatre was nearly empty by the time he had finished. A Radical Economics conference was organized in 1973 by three students — Steve Keen, Richard Fields and Greg Cough.

Meanwhile, student and staff dissent had also erupted in the University of Sydney's department of Philosophy because the professors had opposed the introduction of courses in feminism and (in the previous year) Marxist philosophy. The students in Economics I (being taught by Stilwell) voted to support the strike that the dissident Philosophy staff and students had initiated. Approximately 200 Economics students attended a 'day of protest' on 25 July 1973, calling for fundamental changes to the Economics courses. Many more demonstrations followed. Meetings of students and dissident staff also decided on the curriculum that they sought, with a pluralist structure combining a range of insights from heterodox economic thought. Professors Hogan and Simpkin predictably rejected it. The Faculty of Economics responded by setting up an official inquiry into the ongoing dispute, chaired by Pat Mills, a Reader in the Department of Accounting.

The Mills committee found that the establishment of a Department of Political Economy would be the best solution, given that the professors in the Economics department were unwilling to accept the changes to course content suggested by staff and students. The Faculty of Economics resolved to endorse the Mills committee findings on 19 April 1974. Law student Malcolm Turnbull emerged in 1975 as a self-appointed 'mediator' of the dispute, seeking to retain a united economics department, to no avail. The Students' Representative Council (SRC) in 1976, with another Law student David Patch as president, supported the proposal for separate political economy course proposals and a new Political Economy department. The university's Professorial Board, seeking an end to the turmoil on campus, officially accepted the new Political Economy course proposals, to start in 1975, but the Vice chancellor, Bruce Williams, declined to create a separate department. This lack of congruence between popular demands and the exercise of executive power would be a recipe for ongoing conflict.

The first and second year undergraduate Political Economy courses proved to be popular. In April 1975, Professor Joan Robinson from Cambridge, UK, visited the University of Sydney and spoke at the Wallace Lecture Theatre, arguing that political economy is a better basis for studying economic issues. The first National Political Economy conference, held at the university in 1976 attracted 1500 people from all over Australia. Many of the attendees had also been angered by the Whitlam dismissal. However, tensions within the Economics department persisted over matters such as academic staff appointments and opposition to further curriculum developments. In 1982/3, the political economists feared that the fledgling political economy courses would be lost because the economics professors and their supporters in the university initiated a 'degree restructuring' process. As a response, the SRC organised a vote on the forced merger, in which eighty per cent of the students in the Economics Faculty voted for the maintenance of separate streams.

The students organised further demonstrations in the winter of 1983. On 8 June some students towed a rented caravan into the university grounds and parked it on the lawn by the main Quadrangle. Adorned with a banner describing it as 'the Faculty of Political Economy' the caravan was used as an information centre for the protest movement. It stayed there for over three weeks, staffed day and night by political economy students such as Stephen Yen, Maria Barac and Paul Porteous. On 15 June, students entered and occupied the clock tower in the University Quadrangle. Damage, estimated by the university authorities at $96, was done to the hands of the clock. Then, on 20 June, student activists blocked the entrance to the Professorial Boardroom, where a meeting was scheduled to consider what the university should do about course restructuring within the Department of Economics. After the students were prevailed upon to withdraw and the meeting began half an hour late, some of the protesters then climbed onto the roof of the cloisters outside, continuing to interrupt proceedings. University authorities initiated disciplinary proceedings against six of the activists: David Re, Adam Rorris, Tony Westmore, Daniel Luscombe, Chris Gration and Anthony Albanese.

The restructuring of the Faculty's degrees created the situation whereby, from 1987 onwards, all students studying economics at the University of Sydney had two possibilities open to them — enrolling for the BEc, with its compulsory mainstream economics and econometrics requirements, or enrolling for the Bec (Social Sciences) with the choice of doing either mainstream economics or political economy within that degree. Propaganda aimed at undermining the legitimacy of the latter degree came from journalists such as P.P. McGuinness, David Clark, and former University of Sydney right-wing student leader Tony Abbott. However, political economy continued to flourish within the new degree arrangements. Stilwell had been appointed as the first Director of the Political Economy program in 1983 and continued in this role until the 1990s. By then, a range of third-year undergraduate options had been introduced and the fourth-year honours program was attracting excellent students. Steps had also been taken towards the development of postgraduate studies, with the introduction of a research-orientated Master of Economics (Social Sciences) degree program in 1990 and, in 1999, a new coursework master's degree that emphasised Australian political economy. But different types of threats to the Political Economy program had begun to emerge.

From 1996 onwards, the Australian government led by John Howard dramatically cut all universities' funding, forcing them to vigorously seek alternative revenue sources. Attracting more international fee-paying students became the main game, and at the University of Sydney's Faculty of Economics was well placed to become a big player. It was changed to become a Faculty of Economics and Business; and new disciplines, such as business information systems and international business, were established. The business studies disciplines became better resourced than the social sciences. The Discipline of Economic History was closed down in 2002. Although Political Economy was given a distinct status as a discipline, organizationally separate for the first time from Economics, it was financially squeezed. A steady stream of good students enrolled in political economy, but the number was lower than for the more directly business-orientated disciplines. There were some particular strong growth areas for political economy, though. The Bachelor of Political Economic and Social Sciences degree program; and the introduction of the Bachelor of International Studies added a further surge because political economy was part of the core curriculum that the students studied for that degree.

Between 2004 and 2007, however, the future of studies in political economy at the university again became more uncertain. June Sinclair, a recently appointed Pro-Vice Chancellor, with responsibilities for both the Faculty of Economics and Business and for the Faculty of Arts, sought to shift the Discipline of Government and international Relations from the former to the latter. Political Economy staff watched the process with interest, knowing that any such relocation would probably have ramifications for them, too. A university committee report in 2007 recommended that a new School of Social Inquiry should be created in the Faculty of Arts; and that the disciplines of Political Economy and Government and International Relations be relocated to it, along with the existing Arts departments of Sociology and Social Policy, Anthropology and the Centre for Peace and Conflict Studies. The recommendations were accepted by the university's Academic Board, although the Provost, Don Nutbeam, decided that the new school's name should be changed to Social and Political Sciences to accommodate the preference of the staff in Government and International Relations.

From January 2008, Political Economy became a department in the Faculty of Arts. In 2011, students and staff of political economy successfully prevented a merger with Government and International Relations, retaining their department's independence. Of the original group of activists who had begun the struggle for political economy courses and a separate Department of Political Economy in the early 1970s, Stilwell was the last to officially retire from the university. He became professor emeritus in 2012. The political economy program at the University of Sydney that resulted from these struggles has been described by Reynold Nesiba as "the world's most distinctive undergraduate program in heterodox economics".

== Academic career at the University of Sydney ==
Stilwell's career has been centred on the teaching of political economy. He also became known for linking political economy with broader concerns in the community, the labour movement, NGOs and the media. He is the author of twelve books, is coordinating editor of the Journal of Australian Political Economy, and has been on the editorial boards of Regional Studies, Social Alternatives, Australian Options and Industry and Innovation. He was a colleague of Edward Lawrence Wheelwright, who was also a prominent political economist who taught at the University of Sydney until 1986 and with whom he co-edited books on political economy. Stilwell also co-edited books with Kirrily Jordan, Stuart Rees, George Argyrous, Damien Cahill, David Primrose and Tim Thornton. Stilwell's works have been widely used in teaching, particularly in relation to the ongoing contest of political economic ideas and the use of political economy to illuminate and seek to change how the world works

Central to Stilwell's political economy is a broad view of the field. He clarifies his conceptualisation of the field in an interview with David Primrose. According to him:

Political economy certainly addresses economic issues, but it does so in a more useful way. It emphasizes the social and political context within which economic issues need to be considered. Mainstream economics is notably deficient in this regard...So the challenge for modern political economists is to try to redress this situation. That requires a thoroughgoing critique of mainstream economics. It requires the development of alternative analytical approaches. It requires reintegration of economic inquiry into the broader corpus of social sciences, alongside sociology, politics, geography and history. It requires development of educational approaches that introduce students to more insightful ways of understanding economic phenomena. It also requires vigorous participation in the public arena, so that more progressive public policies and strategies for change can be considered. — Stilwell interview with David Primrose, 2013

Frank Stilwell taught at the University of Sydney for 50 years. He began as a lecturer in 1970. After becoming Senior Lecturer, then associate professor, he became the first Professor of Political Economy at the University of Sydney in 2000. He became emeritus Professor in Political Economy after his official retirement in 2012, but continued some occasional teaching. He ran his last unit of study for honours undergraduate students in Political Economy in 2020.

== Major contributions ==
=== Understanding Cities and Regions: Spatial Political Economy ===
Ecological, ethical, and economic questions intermingle in all of Stilwell's major contributions. Stilwell published 'Understanding Cities and Regions' in 1994, developing the theoretical foundations for spatial political economy, a significant advance over mainstream and orthodox urban economics. Taking inspiration from the work of David Harvey and Manuel Castells, and critically extending schools of thought such as original institutional economics, Stilwell suggests that geography and political economy, together, are capable of explaining processes of urbanisation. Political economy is defined as (but not limited to): (i) the analysis of how production, distribution and exchange are organized; (ii) how economic surplus is generated and the purpose for which is it used; (iii) the source of economic growth and recurrent crisis; (iv) economic inequality and class interests; (v) the role of the state in orchestrating economic activity. Stilwell's contribution is thus to integrate these concerns into broader discussions of space and place related to the 'urban question': ""how and why does the size and structure of cities interact with the functioning of the economy and society?"

=== Reshaping Australia: Urban Problems and Policies ===
Throughout the course of this book, Stilwell identifies a range of problems and policy areas within the field of spatial political economy. These include: (i) housing (ii) transport (iii) the environment (iv) inequality (v) gentrification (vi) the state (vii) regional policy (viii) decentralization policy (ix) urban policy (x) urban consolidation (xi) development and monopoly capitalism (xii) urban conflict and protest. Together, these analytical fields, coupled with the theoretical considerations of Understanding Cities and Regions, form the foundations of the distinct epistemology of spatial political economy. They epitomize the need to understand the connectivity of social and economic processes, and particularly, how these issues manifest at the level of policy in the age of neoliberal governance.

=== Changing Track: A New Political Economic Direction for Australia ===
Stilwell published 'Changing Track' in 2000, offering alternative to policies in the tradition of Political Economy. The book functions principally as a response to the popularisation of Third Way politics, identified by Boris Frankel as 'economic rationalism with a human face'. In response, Stilwell suggests five more fundamental features of elements are crucial in offering a political economic 'fourth way': (i) the pursuit of equity; (ii) an appeal to planned use of economic resources; (iii) the promotion of institutionalised democracy; (iv) the recognition of common interests to promote cooperation; (v) seeking harmony between the economy and the environment. John E. King, while broadly agreeing with the argument, has suggested that a hypothetical second edition of 'Changing Track' would also include considerations of: "the reform of monetary policy, the consequences of financialization, the case for international economic reform, and the response to global warming."

== Public influence ==
We were certainly very conscious of what was going on, not just in Australia, but particularly with Thatcherism and Reaganism as well... So this was the context of the debate, and the great benefit of university education is enlarging your perspective on the world, rather than reinforcing existing views. And Political Economy is certainly in that tradition.

— Anthony Albanese on the Political Economy disputes in the 1970s

With a lecturing career at the University of Sydney spanning more than 40 years, many of Frank Stilwell's students have come to occupy prominent positions in Australian public life. In politics and public life more broadly, these include the following: Mark Latham, Anthony Albanese, Greg Combet, Carmel Tebbutt, Michael Costa, Morris Iemma, Peter Kell (ASIC), Many members of parliament (MPs) were also taught by Stilwell. Among this long list of MPs are the following: Pat Conroy, Jenny McAlister, John Graham, Anthony D'Adam, Paul Lynch, Greg Combet and Robert Tickner, and professors Rod O'Donnell, Ann Harding, Steve Keen, Terry Flew, Margaret Gardner, and Clive Hamilton. In Journalism: Stephen Long, Eleanor Hall, Jessica Irvine, Steve Cannane, Peter Martin, Clancy Yeates, and Michael Janda. Stilwell estimated that he had personally taught about 15,000 students by the time of his retirement.

== Bibliography ==
Year	Title	Publisher
2022	Handbook of Alternative Theories of Political Economy (Co-edited with D. Primrose and T. B. Thornton)	Edward Elgar
2019	The Political Economy of Inequality	Polity Press
2009	Political Economy Now! The Struggle for Alternative Economics at the University of Sydney (Co-written with Gavan Butler and Evan Jones)	Sydney University Press
2007	Who Gets What?: Analysing Economic Inequality in Australia (Co-written with Kirrily Jordan)	Cambridge University Press
2003	Economics as a Social Science: Readings in Political Economy (Co-edited with G. Argyrous)	Pluto Press
2002	Political Economy: The Contest of Economic Ideas	Oxford University Press
2000	Changing Track: A New Political Economic Direction for Australia	Pluto Press
1993	Beyond the Market : Alternatives to Economic Rationalism (Co-edited with Stuart Reesand Gordon Rodley)	Pluto Press
1993	Economic Inequality: Who Gets What in Australia	Pluto Press
1993	Reshaping Australia: Urban Problems and Policies	Pluto Press
1992	Understanding Cities & Regions: Spatial Political Economy	Pluto Press
1986	The Accord and Beyond: The Political Economy of the Labor Government	Pluto Press
1980	Economic Crisis, Cities, and Regions	Pergamon Press
1975	Normative Economics: An Introduction to Microeconomic Theory and Radical Critiques	Pergamon Press
1974	Australian Urban and Regional Development	Australia and New Zealand Book Company
1972	Regional Economic Policy	Macmillan Press
