= Golan (disambiguation) =

Golan may refer to:

== Places ==
Iran

- Golan, East Azerbaijan
- Golan, Ilam
- Golan, Kurdistan

Levant

- Golan, an ancient city
- Golan Heights, a disputed region captured by Israel from Syria
  - Golan Regional Council, an Israeli local government for its settlements in the Golan Heights

Sweden

- Gölan, a lake in Stockholm County

United Kingdom

- Golan, County Tyrone, a townland in Carnteel, Northern Ireland
- Golan, a hamlet in Gwynedd in Wales

== People ==
=== Given name ===
- Golan Cipel (born 1968), Israeli naval officer and former employee of New Jersey governor
- Golan Gutt (born 1994), Israeli basketball player
- Golan Hermon (born 1977), Israeli footballer
- Golan Levin (born 1972), American new-media artist
- Golan Maaka (1904–1978), New Zealand physician
- Golan Pollack (born 1991), Israeli Olympic judoka
- Golan Shahar (born 1968), Israeli psychologist

=== Surname ===
- Amit Golan (1964–2010), Israeli pianist, composer and educator
- Amos Golan, Israeli army officer and weapons designer
- Avirama Golan – Israeli journalist, writer, and translator
- Borja Golán (born 1983), Spanish squash player
- Eden Golan (born 2003), Israeli singer
- Erela Golan (born 1945), Israeli politician
- Eyal Golan (born 1971), Israeli singer
- Fred Golan, American television writer and producer
- Gila Golan (born 1940), Israeli film actress and Miss World contestant
- Idan Golan (born 1996), Israeli footballer
- Ishai Golan (born 1973), Israeli actor
- Itamar Golan (born 1970), Israeli pianist
- Lawrence Golan (born 1966), American conductor and violinist
- May Golan (born 1986), Israeli politician and social activist
- Menahem Golan (1929–2014), Israeli film actor and director
- Oded Golan (born 1951), Israeli engineer and antiquities dealer
- Omer Golan (born 1982), Israeli football player
- Ora Golan, Israeli chiropractor
- Pinhas Golan (1924–2016), Israeli Holocaust survivor and artist
- Rosi Golan, Israeli singer-songwriter
- Ross Golan (born 1980), American songwriter
- Tamar Golan (1933–2011), Israeli journalist
- Tomáš Goláň (born 1968), Czech senator
- Yair Golan (born 1962), Israeli general
- Yaron Golan (1949–2007), Israeli publisher
- Yuval Golan (born 1962), Israeli materials scientist
- Zev Golan, Israeli historian
- Zion Golan (born 1955), Israeli singer

== Other uses ==
- Golan (cycling race), a defunct road bicycle race
- Golan (game), a wargame
- Golan (horse), a thoroughbred racehorse
- Golan v. Holder, a U.S. copyright case
- Golan Armored Vehicle, a US-Israeli military vehicle
- Golan pistol, an Israeli firearm
- Golan Telecom, an Israeli mobile network operator
- Golan the Insatiable, a television series
- Golan Trevize, a character in Isaac Asimov's Foundation series
- Golan v. Saada, a U.S Supreme Court Case regarding the Hague Convention on the Civil Aspects of International Child Abduction.
