= Fighting Against War: Peace Activism in the Twentieth Century =

Essays on World War I

- First edition
- Editor: Phillip Deery; Julie Kimber
- Author: Australian Society for the Study of Labour History
- Genre: Non-fiction
- Publisher: Leftbank Press
- Publication date: 2015

Fighting Against War: Peace Activism in the Twentieth Century is an edited collection from the 14th biennial conference of the Australian Society for the Study of Labour History. The conference brought together scholars to reflect the centenary of the First World War. Edited by Phillip Deery and Julie Kimber, contributors include Karen Agutter, Anne Beggs Sunter, Robert Bollard, Verity Burgmann, Liam Byrne, Lachlan Clohesy, Rhys Cooper, Carolyn Holbrook, Nick Irving, Chris McConville, Douglas Newton, Bobbie Oliver, Carolyn Rasmussen, Phil Roberts, and Kim Thoday.

Edward Eastwood noted that the book is 'Meticulously edited and covering a broad spectrum of peace movements and those involved with them in both Britain and Australia, Fighting Against War-Peace Activism in the Twentieth Century is an important work in documenting the history of peace movements in Australia and the labour/women’s organisations that propelled them throughout the conflicts of the twentieth century."

Artwork for the book was provided by Victor Gordon and Sauce Design.
