= Warren Hogan =

Australian banker

Warren Hogan (born 4 May 1972) is Judo Bank's Chief Economic Advisor. He is also the Managing Director and Founder of EQ Economics.

Hogan is a regular in Australian media (e.g. Skynews), as well as a columnist for the Australian Financial Review. His focus is on the Australian economy and supporting business decision making.

Hogan previously worked for the NSW Treasury Corporation, Westpac, Credit Suisse and ANZ as Chief Economist from 2009 to 2016.

== Personal ==
His father Warren Pat Hogan (3 April 1929 – 17 December 2009) was also an Australian economist and educator. He was professor of economics at the University of Sydney from 1968 to 1998.
