= JACC =

JACC may refer to:

- Java Acceleration system (the University of Manchester, James Clarkson et al)
- Journal of the American College of Cardiology, a cardiovascular journal
- Joyce Athletics & Convention Center, a multi-purpose arena on the campus of the University of Notre Dame in South Bend, Indiana.
- Joint Agency Coordination Centre - Australian government body coordinating the search for Malaysia Airlines Flight 370
