= Malmsjö =

Malmsjö is a Swedish surname. Notable people with the surname include:

- Jan Malmsjö (born 1932), Swedish actor, musical star, and singer
- Jonas Malmsjö (born 1971), Swedish actor, son of Jan

== See also ==
- Malmsjön
