= Bruce McFarlane =

Bruce McFarlane may refer to:

- K. B. McFarlane (1903–1966), historian
- Bruce J. McFarlane (1936–2022), Australian economist
- Bruce MacFarlane, Canadian lawyer
