= Gölan =

Lake in Sweden

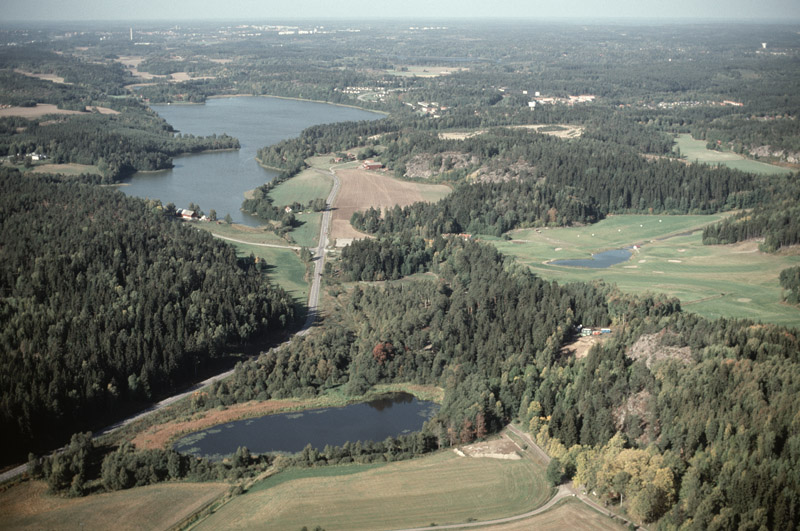
- View over Gölan (in foreground) to Malmsjön

- Location within Stockholm
- Coordinates: 59°09′11″N 17°49′45″E
- Basin countries: Sweden

Gölan is a lake in Stockholm County, Södermanland, Sweden.
