= Gullen =

Gullen may refer to:

People with the surname:

- James Gullen (born 1989), English racing cyclist
- Tore Gullen (born 1949), Norwegian cross-country skier
- Augusta Stowe-Gullen (1857–1943), Canadian physician and suffragette
- Fethullah Gülen (also spelled Gullen), Turkish religious and political figure

Other uses:

- Gullen, an administrative district of Ravensburg, Baden-Württemberg, Germany

== See also ==
- Gulen
- Gollan, a surname
- Gullane, a town in Scotland
