= Angus Houston =

Senior Royal Australian Air Force officer, former Chief of the Defence Force

Air Chief Marshal Sir Angus Houston AK AFC
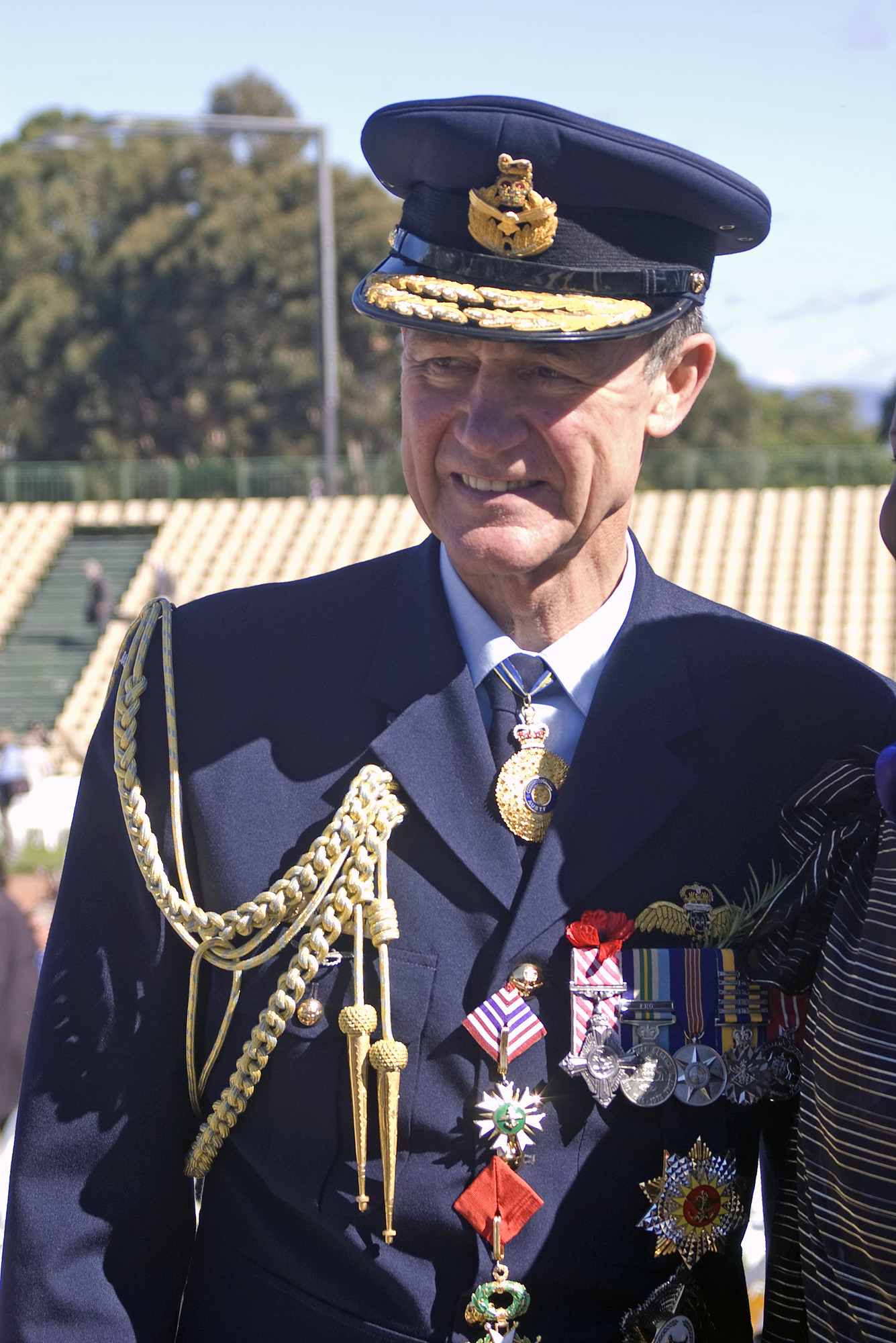
- Angus Houston at the 2010 Anzac Day National Ceremony, Canberra
- Born: 9 June 1947 (age 79); Ayrshire, Scotland
- Military career
- Allegiance: Australia
- Branch: Royal Australian Air Force
- Service years: 1970–2011
- Rank: Air Chief Marshal
- Nickname: Angus
- Commands: Chief of the Defence Force (2005–2011); Chief of Air Force (2001–2005); Integrated Air Defence System (1999–2000); No. 86 Wing (1994–1995); 5th Aviation Regiment (1989–1990); No. 9 Squadron (1987–1989)
- Awards: Knight of the Order of Australia; Air Force Cross; Complete list
- Other work: Chairman of the Council for the Order of Australia; Chairman of Airservices Australia; Chairman of the ANZAC Centenary Advisory Board; Chancellor of the University of the Sunshine Coast

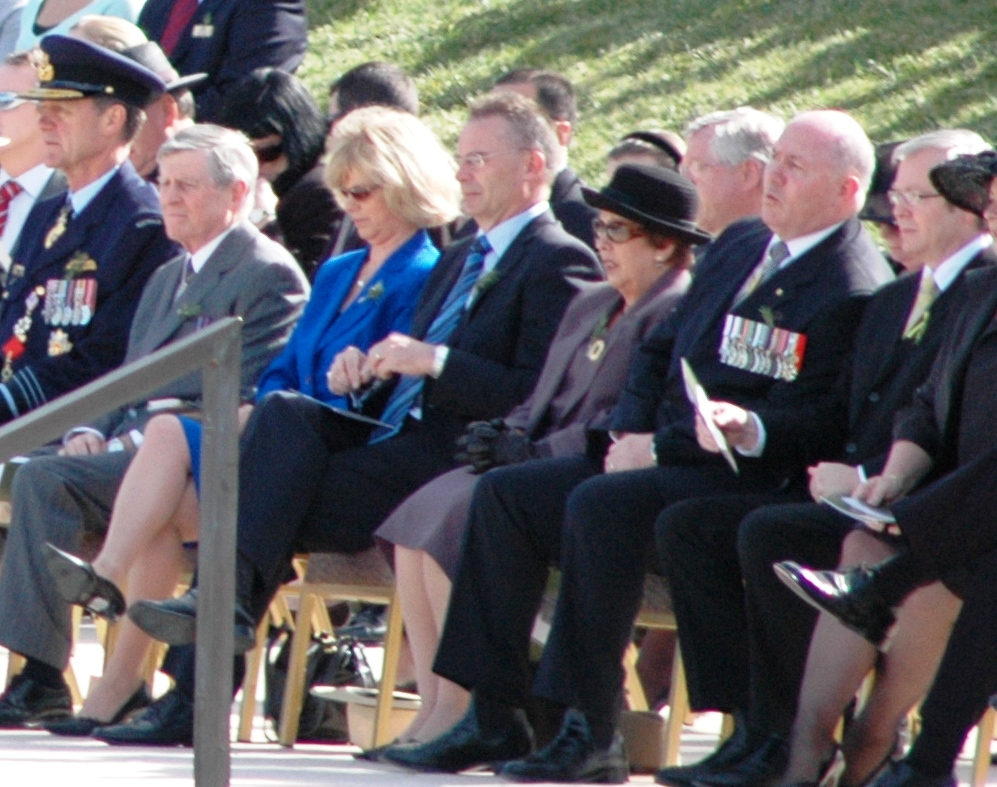
2008 Anzac Day Service at the Australian War Memorial, Canberra (left to right): Angus Houston, Murray Gleeson, Mrs and Jon Stanhope, Mrs and Peter Cosgrove, Kevin Rudd

Air Chief Marshal Sir Allan Grant "Angus" Houston (born 9 June 1947) is a retired senior officer of the Royal Australian Air Force. He served as Chief of Air Force from 20 June 2001 and then as the Chief of the Defence Force from 4 July 2005. He retired from the military on 3 July 2011.

Since then Houston has been appointed to a number of positions, including chairman of Airservices Australia. In March 2014 he was appointed to head the Joint Agency Coordination Centre during the search for Malaysia Airlines Flight 370, and in the Australia Day Honours of 2015, he was knighted for this service.

== Early life and education ==
Allan Grant Houston was born in 1947 in Ayrshire, Scotland, and educated at Strathallan School in Forgandenny, Perthshire. He emigrated to Australia in 1968 to work as a jackaroo on a sheep and wheat farm near the town of Mukinbudin in the North Eastern Wheatbelt region of Western Australia.

== RAAF career ==
=== Early career ===
Houston joined the RAAF as a cadet pilot in 1970 and was soon given the nickname "Angus". On 20 March 1971, he was granted an eight-year short-service commission with the rank of pilot officer, and was promoted to flying officer on 20 March 1973. He spent the early part of his career flying UH-1 Iroquois helicopters in various parts of Australia, Papua New Guinea and Indonesia. On 10 March 1975, he received a permanent commission, with a promotion to flight lieutenant on 20 September.

After graduation from Flying Instructors Course in 1975, Houston completed several instructional tours on Macchi MB-326H, British Aircraft Corporation Strikemaster and Iroquois aircraft. A posting to the Republic of Singapore Air Force (RSAF) from 1976 to 1978 was followed by two years at No. 9 Squadron at RAAF Base Amberley. In late 1979, Houston was posted to Hill Air Force Base, Utah, United States, for exchange flying duties with a United States Air Force helicopter unit.

In 1980 he was awarded the Air Force Cross for an open sea rescue in gale-force winds off the coast of New South Wales in 1979. He was promoted to squadron leader on 1 January 1982.

After a further posting to No. 9 Squadron as the Executive Officer, and staff training at RAAF Staff College, Houston was posted to the Department of Air (Development Division) where he was involved in the Black Hawk helicopter Project. In 1987, Houston assumed command of No. 9 Squadron to introduce the Black Hawk helicopter, to relocate the unit from Amberley to Townsville, Queensland, and to transfer the capability to the Australian Army. In 1989 he served one year in command of the 5th Aviation Regiment. Houston was admitted as a Member of the Order of Australia in 1990 for his work in the transfer of responsibility for Blackhawk operations.

Following graduation from Joint Services Staff College, Houston was posted to the Joint Operations staff at Headquarters Australian Defence Force and was involved in strategic planning during the Persian Gulf War of 1990–1991.

On promotion to group captain in July 1992, he assumed the post of Director Air Force Policy and negotiated the establishment of the RSAF Flying School at RAAF Base Pearce. After completing a C-130H Hercules conversion in 1993, Houston commanded No. 86 Wing from 1994 to 1995.

Houston attended the Royal College of Defence Studies in London in 1996. He was Chief of Staff, Headquarters Australian Theatre from 1997 to 1999, Commander Integrated Air Defence System from 1999 to 2000 and Head Strategic Command from 17 August 2000.

=== Senior command ===
Houston was appointed as Chief of Air Force (CAF) on 20 June 2001 and, in the 2003 Australia Day Honours, advanced to Officer of the Order of Australia. As acting Chief of the Defence Force (CDF) in 2001, Houston played a central role in the Children Overboard Affair. At a Senate inquiry in February 2002, Houston challenged the then government's claim made during the 2001 election campaign, that seafaring asylum seekers had thrown children overboard in a presumed ploy to secure rescue and passage to Australia.

On 4 July 2005, he was promoted to air chief marshal and appointed Chief of the Defence Force. In the Australia Day Honours of 26 January 2008, he was advanced to a Companion of the Order of Australia. In March 2008, Houston's appointment was extended to 3 July 2011.

== Later life ==
After his retirement from the CDF position, the Australian Government appointed Houston as Chair of the Anzac Centenary Advisory Board on 6 July 2011, with the remit to "provide strategic advice and recommendations on the planning and implementation of Anzac Centenary events". On 6 December 2011, it was announced that the Australian Government had appointed Houston as the next chairman of Airservices Australia on the grounds of his aviation, governance and leadership experience.

In June 2012, Prime Minister Julia Gillard announced that Houston would chair an expert group that would examine asylum seeker policy and prepare a report recommending a solution for the Government's consideration.

In February 2014, Houston was appointed chair of the Defence SA Advisory Board. The position was previously held by General Peter Cosgrove.

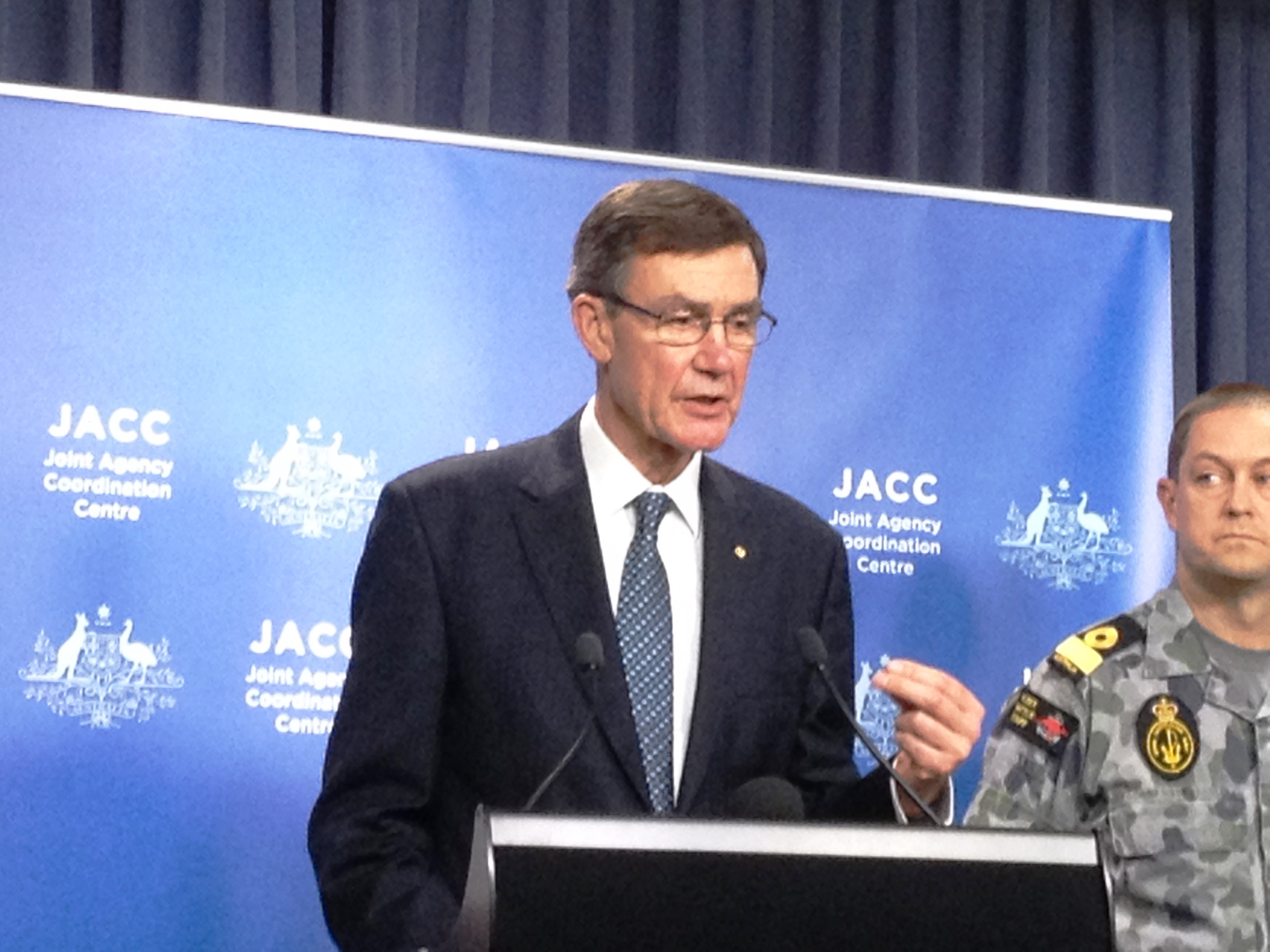
Houston speaking to the media at a JACC press conference in Perth, 14 April 2014

On 30 March 2014, Prime Minister Tony Abbott announced that Houston would head the Joint Agency Coordination Centre (JACC), based in Perth, formed to oversee the efforts to find Malaysia Airlines Flight 370. At that time, the plane had been missing for just over three weeks since its disappearance on 8 March.

On 26 January 2015, Houston was appointed a Knight of the Order of Australia (AK) for his service to Australia and commitment to the MH17 and MH 370 disasters. Saying he was "surprised and deeply humbled", he said he would prefer to be called by his name instead of "Sir Angus". The ceremony in which he was officially knighted was held on 17 April 2015 at Government House, Canberra by the Governor-General of Australia, General Sir Peter Cosgrove.

On 1 June 2015, Houston was announced as the new special envoy for South Australia. According to Premier Jay Weatherill, Houston was tasked with supporting trade missions, providing advice on international engagement strategies and providing important introductions in key markets. Weatherill also noted Houston's strong relationships with military leaders across Asia being potentially advantageous to the state.

Houston was elected to the role of chancellor of the University of the Sunshine Coast and took office from 1 April 2017.

Houston was appointed to the board of Virgin Australia in December 2018, replacing Mark Vaile.

Houston has been an honorary patron of the ACT Veterans Rugby Club, the Bomber Command Association in Australia, Sunnyfield Disability Services, and the Australian American Association Canberra Division. As of 2019 he is the chair of the Canberra Symphony Orchestra.

As of 2021 Houston is a member of the senior advisory group of the Indonesia-Australia Defence Alumni Association (IKAHAN).

Houston is chair of Murray-Darling Basin Authority since August 2020.

== Personal life ==
Houston and his wife Liz, who is a teacher, have three sons.

In July 2010, while CDF, Houston took medical leave to deal with prostate issues.

== Honours and awards ==

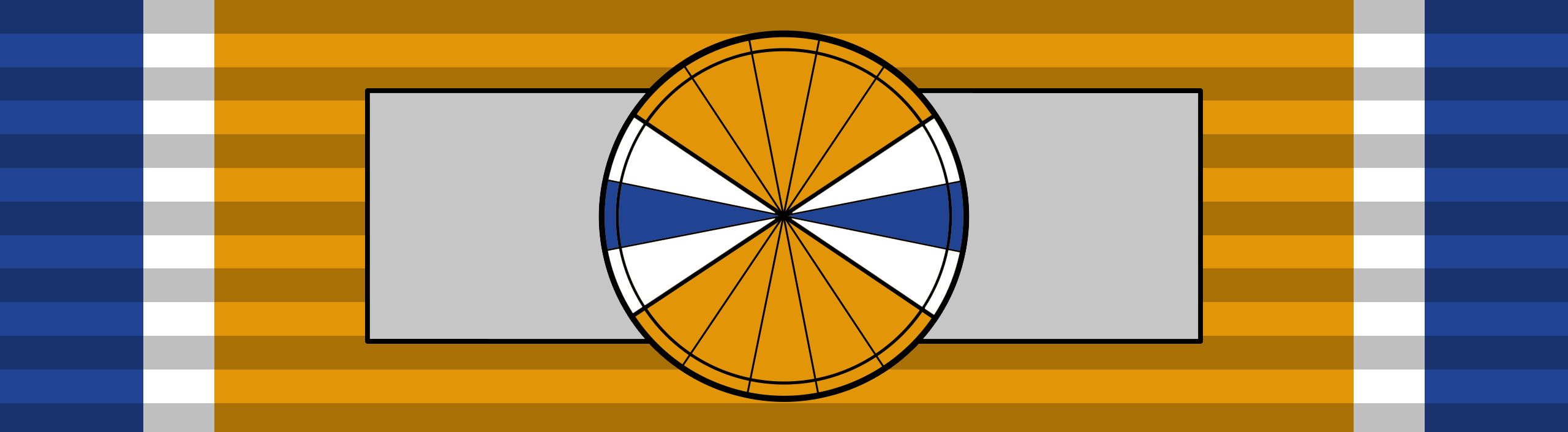

Knight of the Order of Australia (AK)	26 January 2015
Companion of the Order of Australia (AC)	(Military division) 2008
Officer of the Order of Australia (AO)	(Military division) 2003
Member of the Order of Australia (AM)	(Military division) 1990
Air Force Cross (AFC)	1980
Australian Service Medal 1945-1975	PNG Clasp
Centenary Medal	2001
Defence Force Service Medal with Federation Star	40–44 years of service
Australian Defence Medal	
Meritorious Service Medal	(Singapore) 1 August 2003
Knight Grand Commander of the Order of Military Service	(Malaysia)
Commander of the Legion of Honour	(France)
Distinguished Service Order	(Singapore) 24 August 2007
Nishan-e-Imtiaz (Order of Excellence)	(Pakistan) 2008
Medal of the Order of Timor-Leste	(East Timor) 2 February 2011
Commander of the Legion of Merit	(United States) 11 May 2011
Commander of the Order of Orange-Nassau	(Netherlands) (Military division) – 18 May 2011
National Intelligence Distinguished Service Medal	(United States) 2011

=== Scholastic ===
Chancellor, visitor, governor, rector and fellowships

Location	Date	School	Position
Queensland	1 April 2017 – present	University of the Sunshine Coast	Chancellor
Australian Capital Territory		National Security College at the Australian National University	Visiting Fellow

Honorary degrees

Location	Date	School	Degree
Australia	16 December 2013	Griffith University	Doctor of the University (D.Univ)
Australia	27 November 2015	University of New South Wales	Doctor of the University (D.Univ)
Australia	15 December 2016	Australian National University	Doctorate
Australia	August 2017	University of South Australia	Doctor of the University (D.Univ)

Military offices
Preceded by General Peter Cosgrove	Chief of the Defence Force; 2005–2011	Succeeded by General David Hurley
Preceded by Air Marshal Errol McCormack	Chief of Air Force; 2001–2005	Succeeded by Air Marshal Geoff Shepherd
Academic offices
Preceded by John Dobson	Chancellor of the University of the Sunshine Coast; 2017–present	Incumbent
