= Ken Buckley =

British-born Australian academic and activist 1922-2006)

Ken Buckley AM (1922–2006) was a British-born Australian academic, activist, historian and radical economist. He was a founding member of the NSW Council for Civil Liberties and in 2000 was appointed a Member of the Order of Australia for his advocacy of "civil liberties, human rights and social justice" in Australia.

== Early life and education ==
Kenneth Donald Buckley was born in 1926 in Hackney in the East End of London to an English father and a Scottish mother. His parents were "working class" and his father was a lifelong member of the British Labour Party.

He served as an intelligence officer and paratrooper in the Middle East, Greece (liaising with the Greek resistance) and Italy during the Second World War. After the war he graduated in economics with first class honours from the Queen Mary College, University of London. During those student years he joined the Communist Party of Great Britain. After graduation he gained an Assistant Lectureship at the University of Aberdeen.

== University of Sydney ==
In 1953 Buckley was appointed as a lecturer in Economic History at University of Sydney. Over his career at Sydney University Buckley would promote the study of political economy in preference to the study of orthodox economics. He was an author of books on both labour and business history and his "contribution to Australian historiography was significant". He was an editor of Labour History.

Together with his fellow University of Sydney economist Ted Wheelwright he founded a university staff association, which would later become the National Tertiary Education Union, and which aimed to represent not only university professors but also other academics and students.

After arriving in Australia Buckley switched his communist party membership to "a branch in Sydney". He resigned from the party in 1956 in the wake of Krushchev's revelations about the Stalinist era in the Soviet Union. However, he remained "politically on the left" and a Marxist until the end of his life.

In 1957 he went with the South Australian MP, Don Dunstan, on a fact-finding mission to Nicosia where they urged the United Kingdom to give "immediate self-determination for Cyprus".

During the protests against the Vietnam War he supported the protesting students and conscientious objectors including in court cases following arrests. In 1969 he was one of 48 people who pleaded guilty in a Special Federal Court in Sydney to charges under the Crimes Act of having "signed a Statement of Defiance against National Service".

He retired in 1988 and had little to do with the University thereafter, being uncomfortable with the "radical changes" there as the government pushed universities to become "more and more self-financing" and "entrepreneurial".

== NSW Council for Civil Liberties ==
Buckley devoted much of his life to the protection of civil liberties. In 1963 he was co-founder together with Dr Dick Klugman and Jack Sweeney QC of the NSW Council for Civil Liberties (NSWCCL), with the support of "socially aware academics, lawyers, clergy, and politicians". His other associates in the NSWCCL included Neville Wran, John Kerr QC, Lionel Murphy QC, James McClelland, Alan Stout, Michael Kirby, John Kerr, Jim McClelland, John Hirshman, and Berenice Granger (later Berenice Buckley).

During his years in the NSWCCL Buckley attempted "to curb the excesses of the NSW Police", of the Australian Security Intelligence Organisation (ASIO) and others including public service bureaucrats and prison guards. He also fought the censorship by the Australian federal and state governments of books (including Lady Chatterley's Lover), plays (including Oh, Calcutta!) and films.

Although himself politically on the left, he took great care to "keep party politics out of policy considerations" regarding the NSWCCL as that organization was supported by interested lawyers, many of whom inclined to conservatism, and he "consistently opposed takeover bids by radical groups that would have compromised the council's effectiveness".

== Personal life ==
In Greece in the Second World War Ken Buckley met Thoula whom he later married and with whom he would have two children. Berenice Granger, who attended the inaugural meeting of the NSW Council of Civil Liberties in 1963, married Buckley on 28 August 1965. Speaking of Berenice and their work together for the NSWCCL, he wrote: "Our partnership was one of equals".

On 16 July 2006 Ken Buckley died in Sydney of prostate cancer and Berenice Buckley died in 2010.

== Honours ==
- 2000:Member of the Order of Australia "for service to the community as an advocate for civil liberties, human rights and social justice issues in Australia, particularly through the New South Wales Council for Civil Liberties"

== Bibliography ==
- Trade Unionism in Aberdeen 1878–1900, Edinburgh: Oliver and Boyd for University of Aberdeen, 1955
- The Amalgamated Engineers of Australia 1852–1929, Canberra: Dept. of Economic History, Research School of the Social Sciences, Australian National University, [1970]
- Offensive and Obscene: A Civil Liberties Casebook, Sydney: Ure Smith, 1970
- All About Citizens' Rights, West Melbourne: Thomas Nelson (Australia), 1976
- Lectures in the Political Economy of Australian Capitalism, Sydney: Australian and New Zealand Publishing Company, 1978–1983. 5 volumes. Jointly edited by Ted Wheelwright and Ken Buckley.
- Plantation Labour and Politics: Bougainville and Australia, 1912–20, Canberra: Economic History Department, Research School of Social Sciences, Australian National University, 1983
- South Pacific Focus: A Record in Words and Photographs of Burns Philp at Work, Sydney, London and Boston, George Allen & Unwin, 1986. Joint author: Kris Klugman.
- Communications and the Media in Australia, Sydney: Allen & Unwin, 1987. Joint author: Ted Wheelwright.
- No Paradise for Workers: Capitalism and the Common People in Australia 1788–1914, Oxford University Press, 1989. Joint author: Ted Wheelwright.
- Doc Evatt: Patriot, Internationalist, Fighter, and Scholar, Melbourne: Longman Cheshire, 1994. Joint authors: Barbara Dale and Wayne Reynolds.
- QBE, a Century of Australian Insurance: A History of the QBE Insurance Group, Sydney: QBE, [1996]
- False Paradise: Australian Capitalism Revisited, 1915–1955, Oxford University Press, 1998. Joint author: Ted Wheelwright.
