= Defence SA =

Defence SA is the Government of South Australia's lead agency for all defence matters. It is Australia's only stand-alone state defence organisation. It is a single point of contact for all defence stakeholders, streamlining their interaction across the South Australian Government. Defence SA's mission is maximise investment and jobs from the Australian Defence Force and defence industries. Working closely with Defence and industry, Defence SA targets investment and expansion opportunities, drives and supports the delivery of major defence projects and facilities, and pursues the location of additional Defence units and capabilities in the state. Defence SA also plays a key role in supporting the Australian Government's strategic defence policy, particularly by increasing local industry participation and ensuring that state-of-the-art infrastructure and a highly skilled, industry-ready workforce is in place to underpin defence projects.

In recognition of the strong contribution that defence makes to the state's economic prosperity, South Australia's Premier Steven Marshall is responsible for the Defence and Space Industries portfolio.

== History ==
The stand-alone organisation, supported by the Defence SA Advisory Board, was formed on 1 September 2007 to build upon the work of the Defence Industry Advisory Board and the Port Adelaide Maritime Corporation (PAMC) to attract the $8 billion Air Warfare Destroyer (AWD) program to South Australia. Tasked with the role of creating a sustainable defence industry in South Australia, the agency's first task was to support the State Government's 2004 decision to underpin its bid for the AWD program by building a ship lift and Common User Facility (CUF) at Techport Australia. Following the Federal Government's decision in May 2005 to build the AWDs in SA, construction of the CUF started in 2007, before being completed and ready for first commercial use in 2010.

== Executive ==
Richard Price is Defence SA's Chief Executive and has worked within the defence and public safety sectors for over 25 years. He has international industry experience in leadership, business development and engineering. He was preceded by Andy Keough, who served as CE of Defence SA from August 2015 to October 2017, and Andrew Fletcher, who held the position since the agency's establishment in 2007 to 2014

== Defence SA Advisory Board ==
The Defence SA Advisory Board is a formidable line-up of Australia's top Defence and industry experts, led by Chairman and former Chief of Defence Force Air Chief Marshal Sir Angus Houston AK AFC. The Board provides high-level strategic advice to promote the growth of the defence industry in South Australia and plays a key role in guiding the state's defence strategy.

== Partners ==
Defence SA's key partners include: Department of Defence, Royal Australian Navy, Australian Army, Royal Australian Air Force, Capability Acquisition and Sustainment Group (formerly the Defence Materiel Organisation), Defence Science and Technology, Department for Industry and Skills, Department for Trade, Tourism and Investment, Immigration South Australia, Defence Teaming Centre (South Australia's peak defence industry association), Australian Aerospace Alliance, Industry Capability Network, AWD Alliance and Australian Made Defence.
