= Gulen =

Gulen or Gülen may refer to:

== People ==
- Fethullah Gülen (1941—2024), Turkish preacher, author, and Islamic opinion leader
- Levent Gülen (born 1994), Turkish-Swiss footballer
- Nur Mustafa Gülen (born 1960), Turkish footballer and coach

== Places ==
- Gulen Municipality, a municipality in Vestland county, Norway
- Gulen Church, a church in Gulen municipality in Vestland county, Norway
- Gulen (fjord), a fjord in Bremanger municipality in Vestland county, Norway

== Other uses ==
- Gülen movement, an Islamic movement founded and led by Fethullah Gülen

== See also ==
- Gullen (disambiguation)
