= Bruce Scates =

Australian historian, novelist and film producer (born 1957)

Bruce Scates FASSA
- Occupations: Historian, academic, novelist and documentary film producer

Academic background
- Education: Monash University
- Thesis: "Faddists and Extremists": Radicalism and the Labour Movement in South Eastern Australia, 1886–1898 (1987)

Bruce Charles Scates, FASSA (born 1957) is an Australian historian, academic, novelist and documentary film producer at the Australian National University.

== Early life and education ==
Bruce Scates was born in Sunshine, Victoria in 1957. He left Mornington High School in 1975 having been awarded School Dux and a Special Distinction in English Literature for his Higher School Certificate.

He graduated with a Bachelor of Arts (First Class Honours) from Monash University in 1980 before completing a Diploma of Education at Melbourne University in 1984. He then returned to Monash, where he completed a Doctorate in history, graduating in 1987 with a thesis titled "Faddists and Extremists": Radicalism and the Labour Movement in South Eastern Australia, 1886–1898.

== Academic career ==
He began his teaching career as a tutor at Monash University and the University of Melbourne. He then served as a lecturer first at Murdoch University (1987–1989) and then at the University of Auckland (1989–1992). He was appointed associate professor at the University of New South Wales before becoming Professor Of History and Australian studies in a return to Monash in 2007. From 1987 to 2000 he shared all academic appointments with his partner, Rae Frances.

Scates moved to the Australian National University in 2017, where he is a professor of history in the Research School of Social Sciences. He is currently an Australian Fulbright senior scholar, having been awarded a Fulbright 70th Anniversary Scholar Award in 2020.

Since 1989, Scates has been the author and/or editor of 14 academic books and a historical novel.

Over the course of his career he has worked in partnership with a number of public institutions, including the National Museum of Australia, the Western Front Interpretive Centre, the Australian National Archives, the Shrine of Remembrance, History Council of NSW, History Teacher's Association of NSW and the Australian War Memorial.

He has also acted as a policy advisor to various Australian government institutions on public history and education. This includes acting as an advisor to the Office of the Premier of New South Wales, the Department of Education (New South Wales), the Department of Education (Western Australia) and the NSW Board of Studies.

In 2004 he was part of the Department of Defence National Committee to investigate and confirm the presence of mass graves on the site of the Attack at Fromelles at Pheasant Wood, France. His research in military history also meant that he served as chair of the History Working Party advising the Anzac Centenary Board.

With historian Susan Carland he presented a documentary video series titled Australian Journey, filmed around Australia and involving more than 50 major cultural institutions.

=== On Dangerous Ground ===
In 2012, Scates published his first, and to date only, historical novel. Titled On Dangerous Ground: a Gallipoli Story, the book drew on both his historical research and experiences working with government advisory bodies to tell a story about the Gallipoli campaign and its aftermath through the perspectives of a soldier on the frontline, CEW Bean and a historian investigating war graves in 2015.

=== Academic specialisations ===
His work covers a wide range of historical fields including war commemoration, the memory of conflict, history of Anzac Day, labour history, environmental history, the history of mourning and bereavement, the politics of memorialisation, the history of protest, Indigenous history, gender history and digital history.

== Public history ==
Concurrent with his academic career, Scates has also acted as a public historian, through public appearances, lectures and opinion articles. He has written several opinion pieces for the Sydney Morning Herald and The Age newspapers, mostly on the topic of war remembrance and commemoration. He has also been involved in the production of documentaries for the ABC, BBC and Māori Television.

In 1994 Scates was part of consultation with Karrajarri people that resulted in the addition of an extra plaque on Freemantle's Explorers' Monument, adding a counter-narrative to the monument's account of the La Grange expedition and massacre.

== Awards and recognition ==
2020 – Fulbright 70th Anniversary Scholar Award

2017 – History Teachers' Association Award for Excellent and Sustained Contribution to the Teaching and Learning of History

2015 – Mevlana Fellowship (awarded by the Government of Turkey)

2015 – Ferguson Prize for Labour History

2014 – Elected Fellow of the Academy of the Social Sciences in Australia

2014 – Shortlisted for the Ernest Scott Prize

2003 – NSW Quality Teaching Award

2002 – Australian Award for Outstanding University Teaching

1999 – NSW History Fellowship

1998 – NSW Premiers' Children's History Prize

== Notable works ==
Scates, B. and Oppenheimer, M., The Last Battle: Soldier Settlement in Australia, Cambridge, Cambridge University Press, 2016

Scates, B., Wheatley, R. and James, L., World War One: A History in 100 Stories, Penguin, Melbourne, 2015

Scates, B. et al. Anzac Journeys: Returning to the Battlefields of World War II, Cambridge, Cambridge University Press, 2013

Scates, B. On Dangerous Ground: A Gallipoli Story, University of Western Australia Press, 2012

Scates, B A Place to Remember: A History of the Shrine of Remembrance, Cambridge, Cambridge University Press, 2009

Scates, B. Return to Gallipoli: Walking the Battlefields of the Great War, Cambridge, Cambridge University Press, 2006

Scates, B. A New Australia: Citizenship, Radicalism and Labour’s First Republic, Cambridge, Cambridge University Press, 1997

Scates, B. and Frances, R., Women and the Great War, Cambridge, Cambridge University Press, 1997

== Personal ==
Bruce Scates lives in Canberra with his partner, Rae Frances; they have two adult children.
