= Joint Agency Coordination Centre =

Australian government agency dealing with MH370

Agency overview
- Formed: 30 March 2014
- Headquarters: Canberra, ACT, Australia
- Minister responsible: Michael McCormack, Minister for Infrastructure, Transport and Regional Development
- Website: infrastructure.gov.au

The Joint Agency Coordination Centre (JACC) is an Australian government agency which was established on 30 March 2014 to coordinate search and recovery operations for Malaysia Airlines Flight 370, which disappeared on 8 March 2014 and was soon thereafter determined to have ended in the Southern Indian Ocean, within Australia's concurrent aeronautical and maritime search and rescue regions. The JACC is an agency within Australia's Department of Infrastructure and Regional Development, headed by Judith Zielke. It does not perform any search, recovery, or investigation activities, but coordinates the search effort and serves as a primary point of contact for information about the search for media and families of Flight 370 passengers.

== Background ==
On 8 March 2014, Malaysia Airlines Flight 370 disappeared en route from Kuala Lumpur, Malaysia, to Beijing, China, with 239 persons aboard; a search in the South China Sea and Gulf of Thailand was promptly initiated near the aircraft's last voice contact with air traffic control and final contact with secondary radar (the type of radar used by air traffic control). A week after the disappearance, Malaysia announced that military radar determined that the aircraft had traveled west across the Malay Peninsula after being lost by air traffic control. They also announced that communications with a satellite indicated that the aircraft continued to fly for several hours and was last located along one of two corridors—arcing northwest and southwest from Malaysia.

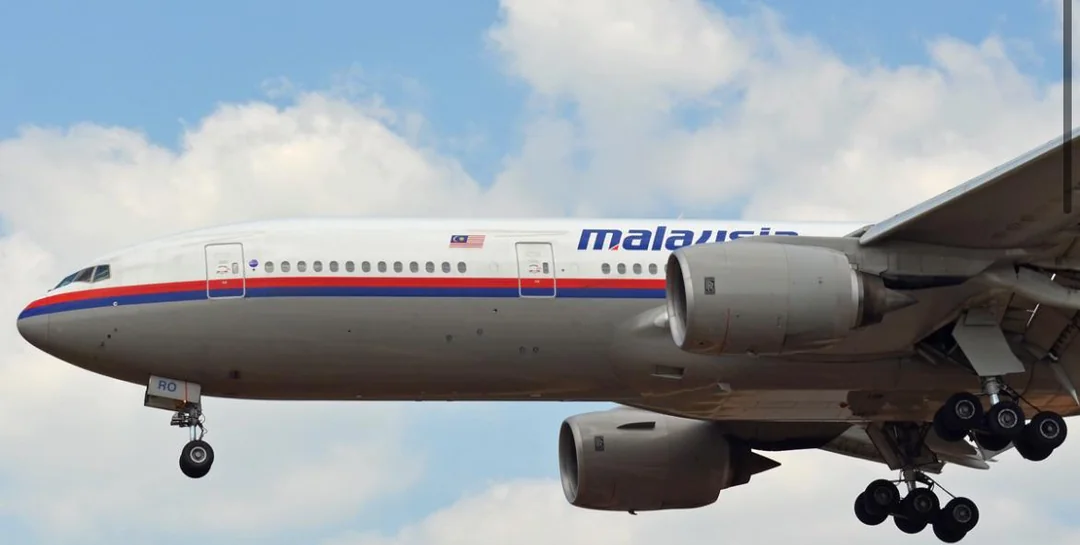
9M-MRO landing at Kuala Lumpur, just hours before the ill-fated flight on March 7th.

The northern corridor was soon discounted and the focus of the search shifted to the Southern Indian Ocean, west of Australia and within Australia's concurrent aeronautical and maritime Search and Rescue (SAR) regions that extend to 75°E longitude. On 17 March, Australia agreed to lead the search in the southern locus from Sumatra to the southern Indian Ocean; the Australian Maritime Safety Authority (AMSA), Australia's search and rescue agency, initially coordinated the search within Australia's SAR region, correlating information with the Australian Transport Safety Bureau (ATSB) and officials in Malaysia.

== History ==
=== Establishment ===
Australian prime minister Tony Abbott announced the creation of the JACC on 30 March 2014 to coordinate the search within Australian waters; the JACC became operational the following day, assuming from AMSA the coordination of the search effort and communications with the media, foreign governments, and between Australian government agencies. Initially based in Perth, Western Australia, the JACC offices were relocated in May 2014 to Canberra, although they can be quickly relocated to Perth if necessary.

=== Search ===
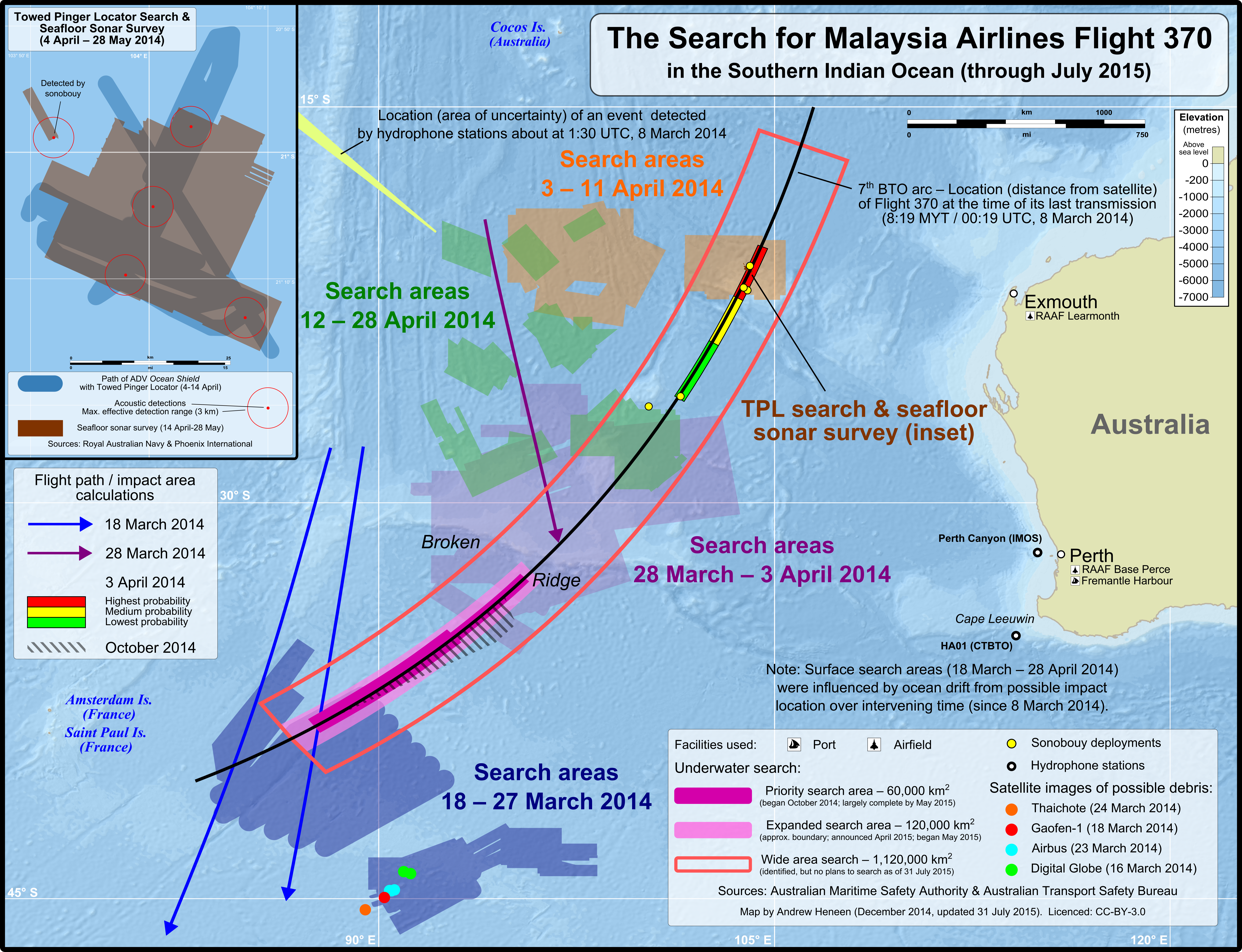
The shifting search zones for Flight 370 in the Southern Indian Ocean. The inset shows the path of taken by the vessel ADV Ocean Shield operating a towed pinger locator, acoustic detections, and the sonar search. The current underwater phase (both the wide area search and priority area) is shown in pink.

After the establishment of the JACC, a search of the ocean surface by aircraft continued until 28 April. An acoustic underwater search for underwater locator beacons attached to the aircraft's flight recorders ended 14 April, followed by a sonar survey of the seafloor near an area where acoustic detections were made. The sonar survey finished on 28 May and found nil debris from the aircraft.

After the initial search efforts through May, active searching ceased as plans and preparations were made for a new phase, called the "underwater search," which would be preceded by a bathymetric survey. Plans for the new phase were announced in late June and the underwater search commenced in October 2014.

== Organisation ==
The JACC is a division of the Australian government's Department of Infrastructure and Regional Development. The Australian government has budgeted A$2 million over two years to the Department of Infrastructure and Regional Development for costs related to the JACC.

At the time of its establishment, retired Air Chief Marshal Sir Angus Houston—former head of Australia's military (2005–2011)—was appointed to head the JACC by Prime Minister Abbott. After the crash of Malaysia Airlines Flight 17, in July 2014, Houston left the agency when he was appointed as Australia's special envoy in Ukraine to recover and repatriate bodies of Australian victims, assist relatives of Australian victims, and ensure that a proper investigation of the crash was initiated in accordance with international standards. In January 2015, Houston was appointed a Knight of the Order of Australia for his military service and for his "continued commitment to serve the nation in leadership roles, particularly the national responses to the Malaysia Airlines Flight 370 and Malaysia Airlines Flight 17 disasters." As of March 2015, Judith Zielke is the Chief Coordinator of the JACC. Zielke is also the executive director of the JACC's parent division, the Surface Transport Policy division, within the Department of Infrastructure and Regional Development.

== Activities ==
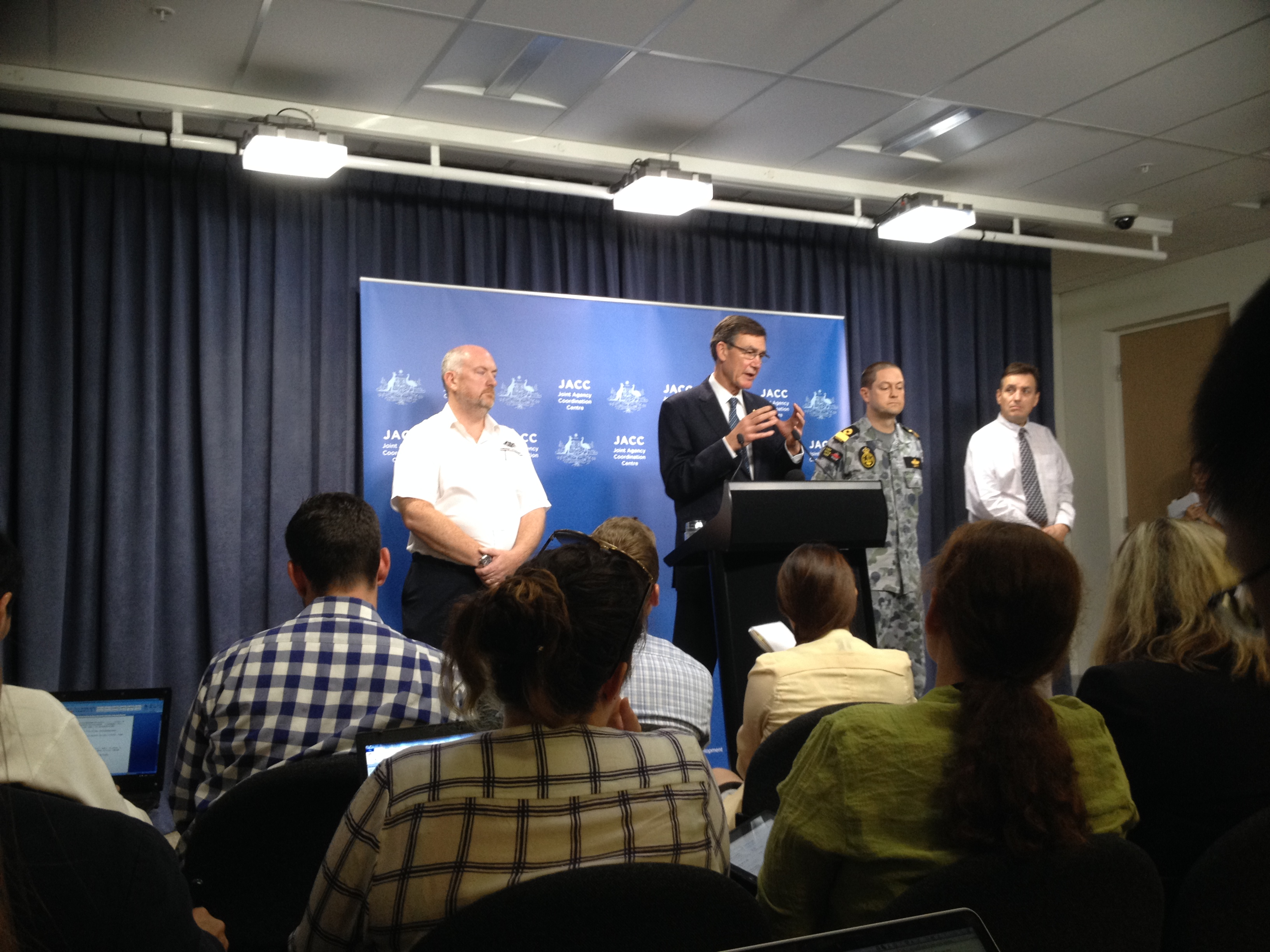
Angus Houston speaking at Joint Agency Coordination Centre press conference in Perth on 14 April 2014

The JACC does not perform any search, recovery, or investigation activities, but provides a single point of contact for affected parties, including relatives of the missing passengers and crew, and communication between agencies and organisations involved in the search. The JACC also provides information to the public about the latest developments in the search and recovery operation.

=== Search coordination ===
The JACC is responsible for coordinating the search efforts for Flight 370 within Australian waters. At the time of the agency's creation, the search effort involved China, Japan, Malaysia, New Zealand, South Korea, United Kingdom, and the United States as well as several agencies of the Australian government: the Australian Maritime Safety Authority (AMSA), the Australian Transport Safety Bureau (ATSB), the Department of Defence, and the Department of Foreign Affairs and Trade. The search activities also involved analysis of the flight's satellite communications by Inmarsat, the AAIB (UK), the NTSB (US), and other organisations.

After the initial search efforts through May, the agency has worked primarily with Australian government agencies, Malaysia, and China to plan and carry out the bathymetric survey and underwater search. The JACC works closely with the ATSB, which is the agency responsible for defining the search area and carrying out the tenders for the underwater search and, if possible pieces of Flight 370 are located, the recovery effort. Geoscience Australia works closely with the ATSB to perform the bathymetric survey and underwater search. The JACC also works with Malaysia and China, which have both sent representatives to work at the JACC offices.

=== Media ===
External videos
- Search for MH370 A video produced by the JACC explaining the complexities and activities related to the underwater search for families of Flight 370 passengers and the general public.

The JACC is the primary source of information from Australian government concerning the search. Since September 2014, the JACC has issued weekly updates—"Operational Search Updates"—highlighting the week's key developments, search progress, ship movements, and weather. The updates also mention and link to newly released images, interviews, videos, media statements, and reports concerning the search and released by agencies involved in search activities. The agency's website maintains press releases, transcripts of press conferences, communiqués of the tripartite meetings (between Australia, China, and Malaysia), and photos, videos, maps, and reports published by several agencies that are related to the search.

=== Relatives of passengers ===
The JACC serves as a single point of contact for the relatives of Flight 370 passengers. The agency's weekly search updates are provided in both English and Mandarin Chinese (the majority of Flight 370's passengers were Chinese). In addition to search information, the JACC serves as a liaison with the passengers' families to provide visas, counselling, accommodation assistance, and interpretation services.
