= Diane Kirkby =

Australian historian

- Born: 24 July 1948 (age 78); Walgett, New South Wales
- Awards: Fulbright Post-Doctoral Fellowship (1985) WK Hancock Prize (1992); Fellow of the Academy of the Social Sciences in Australia (2005) Fellow of the Australian Academy of the Humanities (2011)

Academic background
- Education: University of New South Wales (BA); University of California, Santa Barbara (MA, PhD)
- Thesis: Alice Henry: The National Women's Trade Union League of America and Progressive Labor Reform, 1906–1925 (1982)

Academic work
- Discipline: History
- Sub-discipline: Women's history Cultural history Legal history
- Institutions: La Trobe University; University of Melbourne

Diane Elizabeth Kirkby, FAHA, FASSA (born 24 July 1948) is an Australian historian. She is Professor of Law and Humanities at the University of Technology Sydney and professor emeritus of History at La Trobe University. Since 2016, Kirkby has been the editor of Labour History, the journal of the Australian Society for the Study of Labour History.

== Early life and education ==
Diane Elizabeth Kirkby was born in Walgett, New South Wales, in 1948. Her education began by correspondence course and at age six she was sent to board in Tamworth at the Church of England Girls School and later to Presbyterian Ladies' College, Pymble. Her high school education was completed at Camden High School.

== Academic career ==
Kirkby has written about labour history, legal history, women's history and cultural history, including developing the concept of ocker chic. Kirkby was elected fellow of the Academy of the Social Sciences in Australia in 2005 and fellow of the Australian Academy of the Humanities in 2011.

== Works ==
- Kirkby, Diane (1991). Alice Henry: The power of pen and voice: The life of an Australian–American labor reformer. Cambridge: Cambridge University Press. ISBN 0-521-39102-4.
- Kirkby, Diane, ed. (1995). Sex Power and Justice: Historical perspectives of law in Australia 1788–1990. Melbourne: Oxford University Press. ISBN 0-19-553734-3.
- Kirkby, Diane (1997). Barmaids: A history of women's work in pubs. Cambridge (UK): Cambridge University Press. ISBN 0-521-56038-1.
- Kirkby, Diane (2008). Voices From the Ships: Australia's seafarers and their union. Sydney: UNSW Press. ISBN 978-0-86840-902-3.
- Kirkby, Diane, ed. (2012). Past Law, Present Histories. Canberra, ACT, Australia: Australian National University. ISBN 978-1-922144-03-4.
- Garner, Alice; Kirkby, Diane (2018). Academic Ambassadors, Pacific Allies: Australia, America and the Fulbright Program. Manchester: Manchester University Press. ISBN 978-1-5261-2898-0.
- Kirkby, Diane; Monk, Lee-Ann; Ostapenko, Dmytro (2022). Maritime Men of the Asia-Pacific: True-blue Internationals Navigating Labour Rights, 1906-2006. Oxford: Oxford University Press. ISBN 9781802077193.
