= Daphne Gollan =

Australian feminist, historian and activist (1918–1999)

Eileen Daphne Gollan née Morris (4 May 1918 – 4 October 1999) was an Australian feminist, historian and activist and member of the Communist Party of Australia. She studied Russian language and politics and spent much of her career, between 1954 and 1983, working at the Australian National University.

== Biography ==
Gollan was born in Birmingham, in England, and was the youngest child of Marjorie Emmeline, née Gold, and Montague Morris who worked as a munitions worker. The family immigrated to Australia in the 1920s where they settled in Sydney where they experienced difficult times during the Great Depression which saw both her father and her siblings lose their jobs and her mother dying of cancer in 1930. Also during this period, Gollan and her brother both suffered with tuberculosis in 1934. Gollan would later state that growing up in the Depression "radicalized [her] for life".

Recognised for her intelligence, Gollan was sent to a nearby Catholic school as a weekly boarder where, still a child, she was expelled for her disbelief in Transubstantiation; a view likely influenced by her father who followed humanist socialism. Later, around the age of 12, she was awarded a bursary to Sydney Girls High School.

In 1937, after completing school, Gollan studied English, history and philosophy at the University of Sydney and graduated with a Bachelor of Arts in 1941. During her studies she worked as a library assistant at the Mitchell Library.

In 1941 Gollan joined the Communist Party of Australia and was a founding member and secretary of the National Youth Parliament.

On 10 May 1941 Gollan married Robin Gollan, who was a school teacher and fellow communist and they had a child together, Klim, before he left for war service in World War II. They also later had a daughter named Kathy. During the war the Communist Party was declared illegal and members began to use pseudonyms to hide their involvement and, wanting their names to be memorable, Gollan adopted the distinctive "Cleopatra Sweatfigure".

Bwtween 1945 and 1947 Gollan worked as a librarian for the Federated Ironworkers’ Association within their research department and, as a part of this role, was one of the transcription stenographers for legal proceeding about the Balmain ironworker's strike, led by Nick Origlass, in 1945. She would later write extensively about this strike, and her views on it, in the journal Labour History (1972).

In 1950 Gollan moved with her husband to England where he was completing his doctoral thesis and the London School of Economics and, on their return to Australia, they settled in Canberra as he had accepted a position at the Australian National University (ANU). This was considered to be a risky choice for her husband due to his connection to her as a communist.

Gollan struggled to find work in Canberra for, as a Communist, she was considered a security risk by the Australian Security Intelligence Organisation. This meant that she was denied employment at the Commonwealth Parliamentary Library where the chief librarian, Harold Leslie White being "particularly anxious to appoint her". A year later she was able to gain a position at ANU as a library assistant while, concurrently, studying the Russian language at Canberra University College. Associated with these studies she read widely about Russian history and politics. At the library she felt closely monitored and watched and said of this time "I acquired demonic significance, whispered about and, in some quarters, shunned".

Gollan continued to work at the university, in various roles, until 1961 when she resigned to become a full-time student there, receiving a Master of Arts in 1967. During these studies she became a postgraduate exchange scholar with the Moscow State University between 1962 and 1963 and, on her return to Canberra wrote her thesis: Bolshevik Party Organisation in Russia, 1907–12 (1967) which was drawn on research conducted during this exchange. In 1967 Gollan and her husband divorced.

In 1966 Gollan was appointed as a tutor of history at ANU by Manning Clark as a part of his practice of recruiting talented people from different backgrounds. Later, in 1970, she was promoted to lecturer and updated a number of courses which were very popular with students and is seen as a major influence on radical student politics at the university. Also in 1970 Gollan was a founding participant in the Canberra Women's Liberation group and she offered women a personal example of a woman in a leadership role while vehemently rejecting the role of mentor. With them she took part in all of their major actions including marching with the Women against Rape in War. In 1978 she wrote a memoir, "Memoirs of Cleopatra Sweatfigure" (based off her war time pseudonym), for the Women and Labour Conference at Macquarie University: this memoir was later published in 1980.

During this period she was also in a relationship with Nick Origlass, who remained married and they became a discreet and permanent part of each other's lives and they would meet weekly at a house in Mittagong. Their relationship continued until his death in 1996.

In 1983 Gollan retired from ANU and returned to Sydney where she joined The Greens NSW, which was first registered in 1984. She unsuccessfully stood for the seat of Sydney in the NSW House of Representatives having pledged to demolish the Sydney Monorail. Later, in 1984 and 1987, she would also run for Senate.

Gollan died on 4 October 1999 in Glebe. On her death Susan Magarey said of her:

Feminists, radical students, left-wing historians: we have all lost a dear friend. And the world has lost a wonderful person—one of the giants of our time.

— Susan Magarey, Eileen Daphne Gollan (1918–1999), via Obituaries Australia

== Collections ==
Gollan's papers, along with those of her husband and Nick Origlass, are held at the State Library of New South Wales.
