= Victor Gordon =

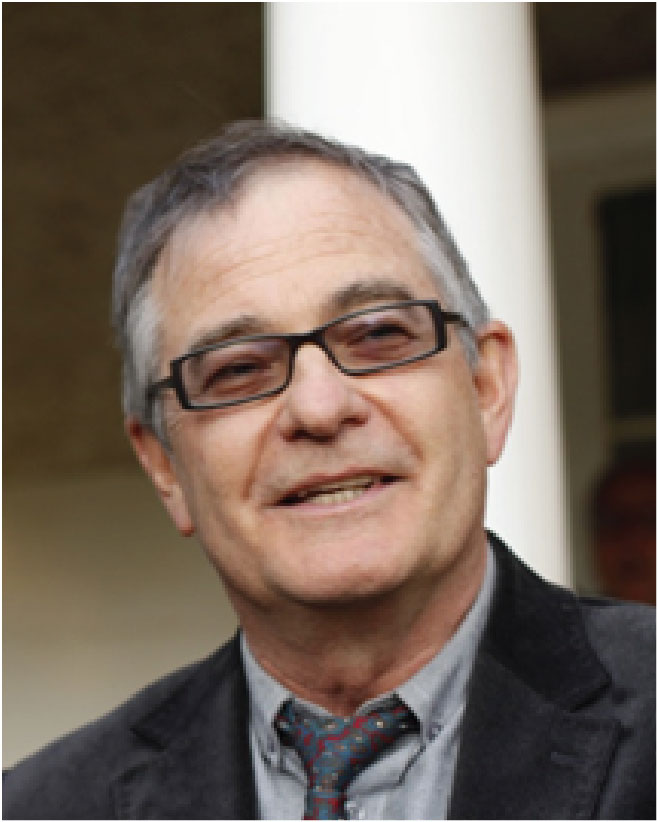
- Born: 20 September 1953 (age 73); Alberton, Transvaal (now Gauteng), South Africa
- Education: University of the Witwatersrand (BA); Sydney College of the Arts (MA)
- Known for: Paintings, sculpture, installations, assemblages, collages, drawings, prints and photographs
- Notable work: "A Transposed Landscape" – 1990 Oil on canvas. 180 x 225 cm (After Alvarez Bravo: Striking Worker, assassinated, 1934—Photograph) Collection: Ifa Lethu Foundation | “System” 1989 Oil on canvas 180 x 225 cm IFA LETHU Foundation Collection | Amandla ('Power')– The Punch and Jury Show 1989, Mixed Media, 21.6 x 35.3cm, Collection: The South African National Gallery | Memorate.com.au – Anzac Installation, 2015 Orange Regional Gallery | Mike Parr at the MCA 2006, Oil on canvas 225 x 180 cm Sulman Prize 2007 — Finalist
- Style: Combination of Realism and Modernism
- Movement: Contemporary
- Spouse: Kira Brown
- Website: www.victorgordon.com

Victor Gordon (born 1953) is a visual artist born in South Africa. Gordon is primarily a painter and sculptor. He also creates installations assemblages, collages, drawings and photographs.

== About the Artist ==
Gordon was born during the Apartheid era in South Africa. He grew up in Alberton, a satellite township near Johannesburg before his family relocated to Hillbrow. He attended the whites-only Germiston High School (1966–1968) and then Parktown Boys High School (1968–1970). He was arrested at age fifteen when he attacked a white Policeman for setting his dog on a black man in Hillbrow. This resulted in his incarceration and appearance in Juvenile court, where he was convicted of assault. He was conscripted into the South African Air Force Gymnasium Valhalla (SAAF) 1971–1972. After spending some time in London and continental Europe, he returned to Johannesburg where he co-founded a commune at 30 Wellington Road in Parktown. In 1975 he moved to Cape Town, returning to Johannesburg in 1977 to study Fine Arts at the University of the Witwatersrand. He was taught by artists Judith Mason, Robert Hodgins, Giuseppe Cattaneo and Paul Stopforth. After University he stood unsuccessfully for the Progressive Party in the 1982 election to the Johannesburg Metropolitan City Council in the Vrededorp/Mayfair Ward.

By that time he was a supporter of the struggle against Apartheid. Privately he continued making resistance art. Gordon was employed by University of Witwatersrand (WITS) Students Representative Council (SRC) 1982–1987 as Head of Student Administration. He managed the University SRC Administration from 1982 to 1987 in a highly politicized capacity as an administrative ombudsman, ameliorating the effects of South African Police and the SAP Security Branch intimidation, violence and oppression on WITS students. During the second declared South African State of Emergency in 1985/6 he was used, among other things, as the messenger between the senior university administration and their legal representation to deliver documents by hand to Brigadier Jan Coetzee, the head of police at Protea Police Station in Soweto, on behalf of the many dozens of detained students. This was when the whole of Soweto and thirty-five Townships countrywide were occupied by white SA security forces.

In 1987, due to be recalled for a second tour of duty in the SA defence force, he left South Africa to formalize his anti-Apartheid art with further study and subsequently to live in Australia. He undertook a research Master's degree at Sydney College of the Arts, University of Sydney from 1988 to 1990. His graduate exhibition was titled Behold the Lands where Satan Reigns held at the Waterside Workers Federation Hall in Sussex street Sydney in June and July 1990.

Gordon has two children, Sarah and Hannah, and lives in Orange, NSW, Australia.

== Teaching career ==
Gordon taught part-time at Sydney College of The Arts – University of Sydney 1989–1993, at University of Western Sydney and at various Metropolitan TAFE colleges. In 1999 he relocated to Broken Hill, New South Wales, where he ran the Western Institute of TAFE (WIT) Art School until 2003 when he transferred to WIT's Orange Campus, New South Wales, to head the bigger Art, Design and Music School until the New South Wales Government funding for arts’ courses ceased in 2013.

== Art Prize Participation ==
- Salon Des Refusés 1992— Finalist, Portrait Bruce Haigh
- Blake Prize 1996— Finalist
- Sulman Prize in 2007— Finalist, Portrait of Mike Parr — Mike Parr at the MCA 2006

== Art in Public Collections ==
- "Fantasize – Go All the Way" 1986, Oil and pastel on canvas 150cm h x 94cm w. Collection: Johannesburg Apartheid Museum
- Amandla ('Power')– The Punch and Jury Show 1989, Mixed Media, 21.6 x 35.3 cm, Collection: Iziko South African National Gallery
- Azikwele (‘We will not ride’)—Fare raize 1983, Oil on canvas Collection: Iziko South African National Gallery
- 44070—St Edith Stein—Finite, Eternal Being 2001 Oil on board. 60 x 39 cm, Collection: Constitutional Court, South Africa
- The Essential Archbull 1994, Mixed media sculpture: Small metal filing cabinet, cow horns, brass casters and six paperback books on velvet under clear acrylic – 65 x 50 x 58 cm, Collection: Constitutional Court Collection, Johannesburg. South Africa
- [ https://victorgordon.com/art/mnr-die-ware-jakob-the-genuine-article-1986-1990/ Mnr Die Ware Jakob (‘The Genuine Article’) 1986–1990] Collection: [IFA LETHU Foundation]

== Books & Catalogues ==
- It Wasn't Me, I Won't Do It Again An illustrated memoir by Victor Gordon, a socially-engaged South African-born Australian artist. His art practice incorporates strongly-held social views and personal concerns peppered with humour. Beautifully illustrated throughout with over 260 images of his art work addressing an extensive range of social issues.(394 Pages) available in hardcover ISBN 978-0-646-85869-2 eBook ISBN 978-0-646-85817-3 available for purchase and download https://victorgordon.com/product/it-wasnt-me-i-wont-do-it-again-ebook/
- Sun Shining Blood Everywhere - The art of Victor Gordon Foreword by Professor Dr Steven Dubin Columbia University NY. Introduction essay by Dr Andrew Flatau. published by the Orange Regional Gallery 2012 ISBN 978-0-646-57995-5 (143 pages)
- Exhibition Catalogue: Coming Home — Commemorative 2012 Olympic Games London, An exhibition of South African art repatriated by the Ifa Lethu Foundation of South Africa
- Exhibition Catalogue: Home and Away a return to the South, An exhibition of the Ifa Lethu and Art Against Apartheid Collections, Constitution Hill, Johannesburg, South Africa
- Exhibition Catalogue: Victor Gordon : Retrospective
- Victor Gordon : Art & Artist Files (Australia and New Zealand)
- Behold the lands where Satan reigns : anti-apartheid artwork / by Victor Gordon
- Places not Spaces - Place making in Australia, Edited by Tamara Winikoof Featuring Red Easel: Installations No.1 551 King Street Newtown (1993)
- Art and Australia, Autumn 1992 Art Quarterly - Featuring artwork PRETEXT 1991

== Documentaries ==
- The responsive art of Victor Gordon - A film by Vince Lovecchio Published by The Project Zone, 29 Mar 2024
- Margins - A film by Cleon Prineas for the [Cowra Art Gallery, 2004
- Profile on Victor Gordon, Artist ABC24 Arts Quarter Profile on Victor Gordon shown on the 24th October 2012
- Behold The Lands Where Satan Reigns Anti-apartheid artwork by Victor Gordon, June 1990, produced by [SBS Vox Populi], interview by Amelia Bresciani
- MEMORATE.COM.AU View a short film of: ANZAC Art installation – an alternative perspective, by artist Victor Gordon 2015 Video production by Michael Caulfield
- "Eight" Commissioned and composed by David Hoenigsberg, for the exhibition "Behold The Lands Where Satan Reigns". Performed by Susan Langbein at Orange Regional Gallery NSW, 27th May 2005
- Victor Gordon on South African apartheid and art OrangeNewsNow Channel
- Victor Gordon—'Behold the lands where Satan reigns' (1991) Published by Greg Ferris
