= Madge Dawson =

Australian educator, social worker, researcher and pioneering feminist

- Born: Alice Madge Burton; 5 March 1908; Echunga, South Australia
- Died: 15 June 2003 (aged 95)
- Education: Honorary Masters
- Employer: University of Sydney
- Known for: Women Activism, Social Justice, Education
- Spouse: David Dawson
- Children: Sean Dawson, Paddy Dawson

Alice Madge Dawson (5 March 1908 – 15 June 2003) was an Australian educator, social worker, researcher and pioneering feminist. She created the Women's Studies course in the Department of Adult Education at the University of Sydney.

== Early life ==
Dawson was born as Alice Madge Burton, in Echunga in South Australia in 1908. Although she won a scholarship to study medicine at the University of Adelaide the family could not afford to pay for the costs of living there and instead Dawson became a teacher, partly funded by the availability of the South Australian Education Department allowance. In this department of study teachers in the area experienced discrimination to many women around the world, the men earned a higher salary and married women were not allowed to work. When Dawson went to Sydney University similar discriminations were still in place, women were not offered the home loan scheme for married staff. Dawson took on this latter position and won the case, getting the loan.

== Activism ==
In 1937 Dawson traveled with her husband David Dawson. They visited “Japan, Germany and the USSR as well as China and the UK." Dawson felt deeply unsettled as they observed events unfolding in Nazi Germany from the ground, including a speech by Joseph Goebbels, a Nazi politician. Dawson desired to learn from their travels by witnessing and experiencing prejudice firsthand, specifically "racism, sexism, class division, colonialism, imperialism, communism, Nazism and war."

Stirred by her travels, she opposed Nazi organizations alongside "the Spanish people and the International Brigade." Dawson was involved in other political movements, including an organization for Aboriginal rights, the Australian Labor Party, (ALP). She also spoke against the Vietnam War and use of nuclear weapons.

== Career ==
Throughout World War II she worked in an aircraft factory. For several years after the war Dawson gained a number of new qualifications in social work before they returned to Australia in 1954. In 1956 she began working as a lecturer in Sydney University where she initiated the work that would become Women's studies. Initially her course talked about the socio-economic and political status of women in Europe. Many of her students became leading academics in the new feminist movements and the course led to the publication of her book Graduate and Married (University of Sydney, 1965). However, as of late, the demands of the economy as well as recognition of the crucial role women already play have prompted some reevaluation of their potential. She continued to research the topics and produced two further books with academics from three Sydney universities, retiring in 1973 but continuing to lecture part time. Dawson was awarded an honorary master's from Sydney University as well as an honorary doctorate from Macquarie University in 1989.

== Personal life ==
Dawson married David Dawson in 1934. After the war they settled in London and had two sons Sean (adopted) and Paddy Dawson.

== Bibliography ==
- Graduate and Married, 1965
- Why So Few? Women Academics in Australian Universities, 1983
- Against the Odds: Fifteen Professional Women Reflect on their Lives and Careers, 1984
- Families: Australian studies of changing relationships within the family and between the family and society, 1974
