= Yuval Golan =

Israeli materials scientist

- יובל גולן
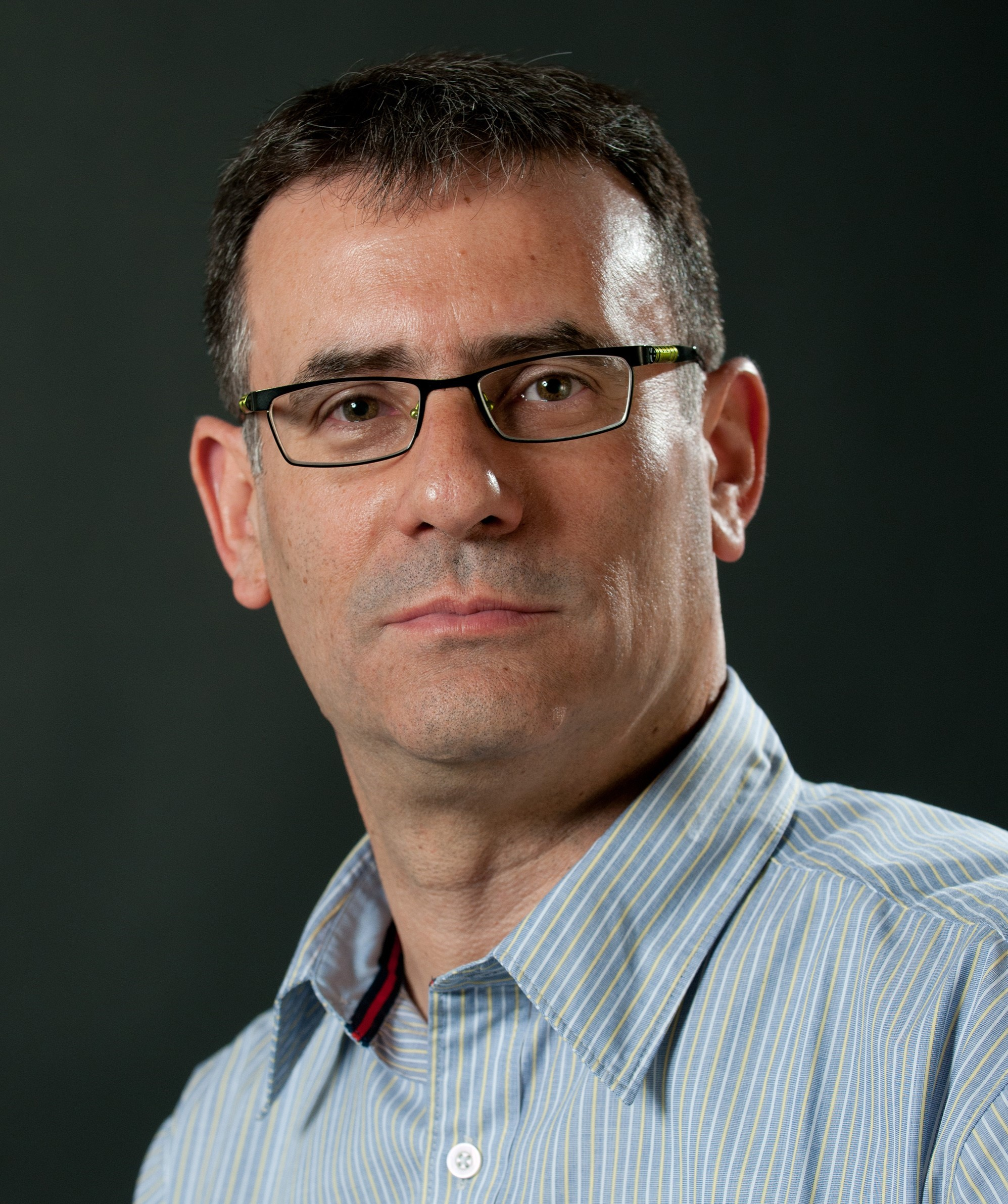
- Born: 1962 (age 63–64); Jerusalem
- Scientific career
- Fields: Materials Science, Nanomaterials
- Institutions: Ben-Gurion University of the Negev
- Website: www.bgu.ac.il/~ygolan

Yuval Golan (Hebrew: יובל גולן) is an Israeli materials scientist at Ben-Gurion University of the Negev (BGU). Golan, a professor of materials engineering, studies materials at the nanoscale level and focuses on their synthesis, characterization and applications. Golan is the Director of the Ilse Katz Institute for Nanoscale Science and Technology, and chairman of the synchrotron committee of the Israeli Academy of Sciences and Humanities.

== Academic career ==
Golan joined the Department of Materials Engineering at Ben-Gurion University of the Negev in 1999 at the rank of Senior Lecturer. He was granted tenure in 2003, promoted to Associate Professor in 2007 and to full Professor in 2010. In 2014 Ben-Gurion University of the Negev endowed Prof. Golan with the Eric Samson Chair of Advanced Materials and Processing.

Golan heads a research group working in the area of nanomaterials and thin films. He is interested in new properties of materials in the nanoscale, and uses quantum size effects for tuning electro-optical properties of nanoscale compound semiconductors prepared in his lab. He focuses on chemical epitaxy, a term describing well-defined orientation relations between film and substrate in solution-deposited thin films of compound semiconductors. He also studies the interactions of surfactant molecules with inorganic surfaces and their use for controlling shape, size and morphology of nanomaterials. He has mentored over the years some 40 research students (for PhD and MSc) and postdocs, and has authored more than 160 peer-reviewed research articles and reviews, in addition to some 250 conference papers presented in national and international conferences. His work has been published in journals in the field of nanomaterials such as Nano Letters, Advanced Materials, Journal of the American Chemical Society, Nature Physics, Nature Materials, and MRS Bulletin.
