= Robin Gollan =

Australian historian, academic and author

Robin Allenby Gollan
- Born: 8 December 1917; Woodburn, New South Wales
- Died: 15 October 2007 (aged 89); Canberra, Australia
- Spouse: Daphne Gollan

Academic background
- Education: University of Sydney (BA); London School of Economics (PhD)
- Thesis: "Radical and working class politics in Australia, 1850-1910"
- Doctoral advisor: Harold Laski

Academic work
- School or tradition: Old Left
- Institutions: Australian National University; Sydney Teachers' College
- Main interests: labour history, banking history

Robin "Bob" Gollan (8 December 1917 – 15 October 2007) was an Australian historian noted for having written the first history of a trade union. According to Stuart Macintyre, this began studies in labour history in Australia. Others have argued that Gollan began the "second generation" of labour history. Along with his former student and colleague, Eric Fry (1921–2007), Gollan established the Australian Society for the Study of Labour History and its journal, Labour History, in 1961.

== Education and personal life ==
Gollan was born in 1917 to William Gollan, a Scottish farmer, and Jeanie Gollan (née Maclean). It was a Salvation Army family. He attended Wollongong High School and Fort Street Boys' High School before undertaking undergraduate studies in arts at the University of Sydney. He graduated in 1939, jointly winning the prize that year with John Manning Ward. At University, Gollan joined the Communist Party of New South Wales. He left the party in 1957 after the Hungarian Revolution of 1956. For a time he was a teacher before enlisting with the Royal Australian Air Force in 1942.

Gollan was married to the Marxist historian, Daphne Gollan (née Morris). They had two children, Klim and Kathy. After their divorce in 1967 Gollan married Anne Aryton.

== Academic career ==
Gollan's academic career began as a lecturer at the Sydney Teachers' College, before he moved to the Australian National University, having survived the vetting process undertaken by the Australian Security Intelligence Organisation because of the university's support. Gollan wrote The Coalminers of New South Wales in 1963. This marked the first professional history of an Australian union.

Gollan was Manning Clark Professor of Australian History from 1976 until 1981. He retired in 1981 and was appointed an emeritus professor in 1982.

== Criticism ==
Humphrey McQueen, The arch-critic of the Old Left, regarded his work as superficial in depth, based on personal preoccupations and scant primary source research.

== Bibliography ==
=== Author ===
- — (1960). Radical and Working Class Politics: A Study of Eastern Australia, 1850-1910. Melbourne: Melbourne University Press.
- — (1963). The Coalminers of New South Wales: A History of the Union, 1860–1960. Melbourne: Melbourne University Press.
- — (1968). The Commonwealth Bank of Australia; Origins and Early History. Canberra: ANU Press Press.
- — (1975). Revolutionaries and Reformists: Communism and the Australian Labour Movement 1920-1955. Canberra: ANU Press.
