= Pinhas Golan =

Israeli artist

Pinhas Golan (Hebrew: פנחס גולן; 1924–2016) was an Israeli artist and sculptor. Golan was a Holocaust survivor and his work focused on the subject.

Golan was born in 1924 in a small village in Hungary and was 15 years old when World War II began. During the Holocaust, Golan's mother and two younger brothers—aged five and seven—were killed at Auschwitz and Golan was imprisoned in a Nazi work camp in Austria.

In 1948, Golan immigrated to Israel and joined the Israel Defense Forces, where he served for the next 22 years. He took part in the 1947–1949 Palestine war, the Sinai War, the Six-Day War, the War of Attrition and the Yom Kippur War. Golan graduated from the Art College in Ramat Gan and earned a Bachelor of Arts in Philosophy and Classical Studies from Bar-Ilan University.

Golan's main work is The Blocked Gate series, which was based upon his personal experiences.

He was married to Siprha and had two sons. He died on 7 February 2016.

== Selected solo exhibitions ==
1989 The Artist's House, Tel Aviv

1992 "Vicious Landscapes", Vigado Gallery, Budapest, Curator: Dorit Kedar

1994 "Partly Brightening", Yad Lebanim Museum, Petach Tikva, Curator: Ruth Manor

1999 "The Blocked Gate", The Artist's House, Jerusalem, Curator: Shulamit Efrat

2000 "Combinations", The Artist's House, Jerusalem, Curator: Nehama Golan

2004 "The Blocked Gate", Foundation for the Memorial of Jewish Victims, Berlin, Curator: Deidre Berger

== Selected group exhibitions ==
1987 Hertelian Artists, Herzelia Museum

1990 Hertelian Artists, Marl, West Germany

"Jerusalem of Lithuania, Museum of Jewish Culture, Vilna, Lithuania

1995 Bar David Museum of Jewish Art, Kibbutz BarAm

1996 "New works in the collection", Yad Lebanim Museum, Petach Tikva

1999–2000 "Green not Cement", Bialik House, Tel Aviv

"On the tip of the tongue", Bialik House, Tel Aviv

2002 "Artists from Israel", Gallery Sulegarden, Assens, Denmark

"Man and his belief", 20th anniversary of the Bar David Museum, Kibbutz Bar-Am

2003 "From individual look", Kfar Saba Municipal Gallery

2006-2006 "Actuality", Open museum, Old Jaffa

2007 Hanita Museum, Dept. of contemporary Art

== Sources ==
- "Pinhas Golan : The Jerusalem Artists' House". Art.org.il.
- "Pinhas Golan – Resume". Artistsonline.co.il.
- "Project 66 – Sixty Years, Six Million". Officeintelavivgallery.com.
