= ANZAC Centenary Advisory Board =

The ANZAC centenary advisory board was established by Department of the Prime Minister and Cabinet of Australia to organise the centenary commemorations of the Australian and jointly New Zealand contribution to the First World War.

== Board members ==
Position	Name	Notes
Chairman	Air Chief Marshal Sir Angus Houston AK, AFC (Ret'd)	former Chief of the Defence Force
Member	Professor David Horner AM	Official Historian of Australian Peacekeeping, Humanitarian and Post-Cold War Operations
Member	The Hon. Arch Bevis	Former Parliamentary Secretary for Defence
Member	Major General Brian Howard AO, MC, ESM (Ret'd)	Board Member Royal Australian Regiment Corporation
Member	Vice Admiral Ray Griggs AO, CSC, RAN	Vice Chief of the Defence Force, (Ex-Officio)
Member	Jackie Huggins AM	Adjunct Professor, Centre for Australian Indigenous History, Australian National University
Member	Luke Bowen	Executive Director of the Northern Territory Cattlemen's Association
Member	Simon Lewis PSM	Secretary of the Department of Veterans’ Affairs, (Ex-Officio)
Member	Professor Christine Charles	Chair of the Resources Technology Innovation Centre
Member	The Hon. Sandy Macdonald	Former Parliamentary Secretary for Defence
Member	Rear Admiral Ken Doolan AO, RAN (Ret'd)	National President of the Returned and Services League of Australia, (Ex-Officio); Chairman of the Australian War Memorial Council
Member	Brigadier Bill Rolfe AO (Ret'd)	Former Services Member of the Repatriation Commission
Member	His Excellency Chris Seed	New Zealand High Commissioner to Australia, (Ex-Officio)
Member	His Honour Judge Rauf Soulio	Chair of the Australian Multicultural Council
Member	Professor Margaret Gardner AO	Vice-Chancellor and President of the Royal Melbourne Institute of Technology
Member	Peter FitzSimons AM	Journalist and author
Member	Kathryn Greiner AO	Chair of Bio Tech Capital
Member	Rear Admiral Davyd Thomas AO, CSC, RANR	Former Deputy Chief of Navy
Member	Sandy Hollway AO	Former Chief executive officer (CEO) and board member of the Sydney Organising Committee for the 2000 Olympic Games
Member	Deborah Thomas	Director of Media, Public Affairs and Brand Development, ACP Magazines. Since April 2015 CEO of Ardent Leisure
