= Heather Radi =

Australian historian and biographer (1929–2016)

Heather Joan Radi (1929–2016) was an Australian historian and biographer.

== Life ==
Heather Radi was born in Tambourine Mountain, Queensland in 1929. Her father Densel Curtis was a beekeeper who Eucalyptus curtisii was named after.

She was a student of St Hilda's School and then University of Queensland where she graduated with honours in 1949. She next studied at the London School of Economics in 1955, and lived in Cairo after marrying Mark Radi, an Egyptian. The couple moved to Sydney in 1960 and later separated.

Radi was a lecturer at the University of New South Wales during the 1960s before joining Sydney University in 1971. It was there she introduced what was described as "Australia's first tertiary-level course on Aboriginal history". One of her students was Susan Halliday, future Federal Sex Discrimination Commissioner for the Human Rights and Equal Opportunity Commission.

In 1975, Radi joined the Australian Dictionary of Biography’s board as the first woman appointed to the role. She was a founding editorial board member of Refractory Girl in 1973 and edited 200 Australian Women (1988). For the latter, she said "It seemed in 1988 that there was going to be a lot of publications about our past, and our past was going to be men's past...[it was an attempt to] correct the male bias in the perception of our past and the continual identification of Australia with the single-man in the out-back, the sort of Lawson figure. That's not our national character at all. Australia has always been an urban people."

Radi died in her home at Elizabeth Bay, New South Wales on 18 May 2016. The National Library of Australia holds her papers.

== Bibliography ==
- Jack Lang (1978) edited with Peter Spearitt
- In Pursuit of Justice (1980) edited with Judy Mackinolty
- Against the Odds - Fifteen Professional Women Reflect on Their Lives and Careers (1984) edited with Madge Dawson
- 200 Australian Women (1988)

== Awards ==
- 2001 - Annual History Citation awarded by History Council of NSW for "her devotion to Australian history not only as a scholar but also as an organiser of ideas and events and a supporter of younger scholars".
