= Bruce J. McFarlane =

Australian economist (1936–2022)

Bruce J. McFarlane (1936–2022) was an Australian economist.

Bruce J. McFarlane graduated from the University of Sydney with a Master of Economics and in 1963 became a research fellow and later a lecturer at the Australian National University in Canberra. From 1963 to 1972, he was a reader at the University of Adelaide. In 1976, he became Professor of Political Science at the University of Adelaide.

At 11 December 2022 McFarlane died in Christchurch, New Zealand.

== Publications ==
- The Soviet rehabilitation of N. A. Voznesenky – Economist and planner. In: Australian Outlook. Band 16, August 1964, S. 151.
- with Helen Hughes, Marian Gough, George Rupert Palmer: Queensland. Industrial Enigma. Melbourne University Press, Melbourne 1964, OCLC 559658382
- Professor Irvine’s economics in Australian labour history 1913–1933. Australian Society for the Study of Labour History, Canberra 1966, OCLC 12172626.
- Economic policy in Australia. The case for reform. Cheshire, Melbourne 1968, OCLC 245202.
- with Edward Lawrence Wheelwright: The Chinese road to socialism. Economics of the cultural revolution. Penguin, Harmondsworth 1973, ISBN 0-1402-1648-0.
- with Robert Catley: From tweedledum to tweedledee. The new Labor government in Australia, a critique of its social model. Australia and New Zealand Book, Sydney 1974, ISBN 0-85552-022-1.
- Radical economics. Croom Helm, London 1982, ISBN 0-7099-1733-3.
- with Peter Limqueco (Hrsg.): Neo-Marxist theories of development. Croom Helm, London 1983, ISBN 0-7099-1641-8.
- with Robert Catley: Australian capitalism in boom and depression. 2. Auflage. Alternative Publishing Cooperative, Chippendale 1983, ISBN 0-909188-72-6.
- with Neville Maxwell (Hrsg.): China’s changed road to development. Pergamon, Oxford/New York 1984, ISBN 0-08-030850-3.
- with Melanie Beresford: A manual of political economy. Karrel, Quezon City 1985, ISBN 971-1033-05-4.
- Yugoslavia. Politics, Economics, and Society. Pinter, London 1988, ISBN 0-86187-452-8.
- with Peter Limqueco, Jan Odhnoff: Labour and industry in ASEAN. Journal of Contemporary Asia Publishers, Manila 1989, ISBN 0-7316-8015-4.
- with Peter D. Groenewegen: A History of Australian Economics Thought. Routledge, London 1990, ISBN 0-415-02123-5.
- with Roger Ottewill: Effective Learning and Teaching in Business and Management. Kogan, London 2001, ISBN 0-7494-3448-1.
