= Kay Saunders =

Australian historian (1947–2026)

Kay Saunders AO FASSA FRHistS
- Born: Kay Elizabeth Bass Saunders; 19 August 1947; Brisbane, Queensland, Australia
- Died: May 2026 (aged 78)

Academic background
- Education: University of Queensland
- Thesis: Uncertain bondage: an analysis of indentured labour in Queensland to 1907: with particular reference to the Melanesian servants (1975)

Academic work
- Discipline: Historian
- Institutions: University of Queensland

Kay Elizabeth Bass Saunders AO FASSA FRHistS (19 August 1947 – May 2026) was an Australian historian and Emeritus Professor at the University of Queensland.

== Early life and education ==
Saunders was born in Brisbane, Queensland on 19 August 1947. She graduated with a BA (1970) and PhD (1975) from the University of Queensland (UQ).

== Career ==
She was employed by UQ throughout her academic career, firstly as tutor, then progressing through the ranks to Professor of History (2002–2005). Following her retirement in 2006 she was appointed Emeritus Professor.

== Honours and recognition ==
Saunders was appointed a Member of the Order of Australia in 1999, and was promoted to Officer in the 2021 Australia Day Honours for "distinguished service to tertiary education, particularly to history, as an academic and author, to professional associations, and to the community".

== Selected works ==
- Saunders, Kay (1 January 1982), Workers in bondage: The origins and bases of unfree labour in Queensland, 1824-1916, University of Queensland Press
- McGrath, Ann; Saunders, Kay; Huggins, Jackie (1995), Aboriginal Workers, Australian Society for the Study of Labour History, ISBN 978-0-909944-04-9 (Reissued in 2020.)
- Saunders, Kay; Daniels, Roger, eds. (2000), Alien justice: Wartime internment in Australia and North America, University of Queensland Press, ISBN 978-0-7022-2991-6
- Saunders, Kay (2011), Notorious Australian women, HarperCollins Publishers, ISBN 978-0-7333-2832-9
- Saunders, Kay (2013), Deadly Australian women, HarperCollins Publishers, ISBN 978-0-7304-9375-4
