= Edward Lawrence Wheelwright =

Australian economist and activist (1921–2007)

Ted Wheelwright
- Born: Edward Lawrence Wheelwright; 1921; Sheffield, England
- Died: 2007 (aged 85–86); Sydney, New South Wales, Australia
- Education: University of St Andrews
- Occupations: Economist, lecturer at Bristol University, lecturer at University of Sydney, radio presenter, Commonwealth Bank board member, editor Political Economy newsletter
- Known for: Analysis of Corporate Globalisation, International Trade Theory
- Spouse: Wendy McGregor

Edward Lawrence Wheelwright (1921–2007) was an Australian economist, radio host and anti-war activist who taught at the University of Sydney from 1952 until 1986. He has written on Australian economic history, often from an institutionalist or Marxian perspective, and his published works have included the analysis of capitalism in Australian history and an analysis of the influence and development of transnational corporations. He authored 11 books independently and 5 with co-editors, and made frequent appearances on ABC Radio's Notes on the News program. He is the namesake of a memorial lecture at the University of Sydney and an annual prize in the university's political economy course. While at the University of Sydney, he set up the Transnational Corporations Research Project.

== Study of transnational corporations ==
Wheelwright was a vocal critic of the influence of transnational corporations in the politics of sovereign countries. Writing in 1982 with G.J. Crough, he argued:

"The kind of state that transnationals have opted to work closely with ... are some of the most repressive of states in the world which, to provide the political stability, good investment climate and cheap, disciplined labour so beloved of transnational managers, have repressed political demands, depoliticised the populace, destroyed political institutions, and emasculated organised labour. ... There are those who argue that such repression shows the true face of capital, liberal capitalism being an historical aberration."

Along with fellow University of Sydney economist Gregory Crough, Ted Wheelwright was one of the founding members and permanent staff of the Transnational Corporations Research Project, set up through the University of Sydney in July 1975. The stated goal of the project was to "provide information on, and initiate research into aspects of foreign investment, and the activities of transnational corporations in Australia." Publications of the project assert three objectives;

"(a) the publication of books, research monographs, working papers and data papers,
(b) the building up of a library of books, articles and relevant journals...
(c) the establishment of relationships with similar research projects in other countries..."

Through the project Wheelwright kept a correspondence with the United Nations Information and Research Centre on Transnational Corporations, the Transnational Institute in Washington, and an institute of the same name in Amsterdam. More than forty documents were published by the Transnational Corporations Research Project.

== Published works ==
=== Books ===
- Wheelwright, E.L. & Buckley, K. False Paradise: Australian Capitalism Revisited, 1915–1955, Oxford University Press (1998)
- Wheelwright, E.L. & Crough, G.J. Australia, the client state : a study of the effects of transnational corporations (Sydney: Transnational Corporations Research Project, University of Sydney) (1981)
- Wheelwright, E.L. Radical political economy: collected essays, Sydney : Australia & New Zealand Book Co. (1974)

=== Articles ===
- Crough, G. J., Wheelwright, E. L. Australia: client state of international capital: a case study of the mineral industry. Essays in the Political Economy of Australian Capitalism. v.5, 1983: -15—42
- Wheelwright, Ted Transnational Corporations and Dependent Development in Asia and the Pacific, Consumers, transnational corporations and development, (Sydney: University of Sydney, Transnational Corporations Research Project) (1986) pp. 15–44
- Wheelwright, E.L. & Crough, G.J. The Changing Pacific Rim Economy, with Special Reference to Japanese Transnational Corporations: A View from Australia published in: Economic institutions in a dynamic society: Search for a new frontier. (Proceedings of a conference held by the International Economic Association in Tokyo, Japan) 1989, pp. 61–78
- Wheelwright, E. L. Why Has Economics Become So Conservative? The Visible Hand of the Think-Tanks Journal of Economic and Social Policy, Summer 1995, vol.1(1) pp. 21–29
- Wheelwright, E.L. Political Constipation and Vested Interests: The Scott & Jackson Committees of Inquiry, Journal of Economic and Social Policy Vol:2(1) (1997) pp. 1325–2224
- Wheelwright, Ted Carte blanche for global corporations: What is the MAI? Why is it so worrying? Arena Magazine (Fitzroy, Vic), no.34, Apr/ May (1998) pp. 38–40.

=== Transnational corporations research project papers ===
- Wheelwright, E.L. Transnational corporations and the new international divisions of labour: some implications for Australia, (Sydney: University of Sydney, Transnational Corporations Research Project) Occasional Paper No. 4
- Wheelwright, E.L. Consumers and Transnational Corporations, (Sydney: University of Sydney, Transnational Corporations Research Project) Working Paper No. 11
- Crough, G.J. and Wheelwright, E.L. Foreign ownership and control of Australian industries and resources: a data compendium, (Sydney: University of Sydney, Transnational Corporations Research Project) Data Paper No. 3
- Crough, G.J. and Wheelwright, E.L. (1982) Transnational corporations and the Pacific, (Sydney: University of Sydney, Transnational Corporations Research Project) Working Paper No. 12

=== Oral Recordings ===
- Wheelwright, E.L.; Kuhn, R. (1990). Ted Wheelwright interviewed by Rick Kuhn [sound recording]., National Library of Australia.
