= Warren Hogan (professor) =

Australian economist and educator

Warren Pat Hogan (3 April 1929 – 17 December 2009) was an Australian economist and educator. He was professor of economics at the University of Sydney from 1968 to 1998.
