= Rae Frances =

Australian historian and academic

Rae Frances AM, FASSA
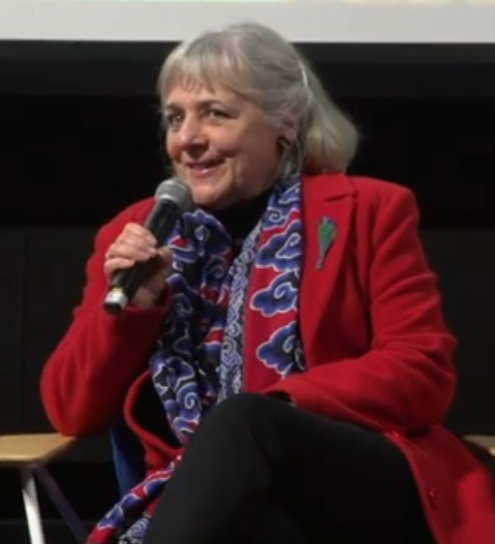
- At a National Reconciliation Week panel discussion in 2021
- Born: Raelene Frances Anderson; 1955 (age 70–71); Collie, Western Australia
- Spouse: Bruce Scates
- Awards: New South Wales Premier's Children's History Prize (1998); Fellow of the Academy of the Social Sciences in Australia (2011); Member of the Order of Australia (2020)

Academic background
- Education: University of Western Australia (BA [Hons], MA); Monash University (PhD)
- Thesis: The Politics of Work: Case Studies of Three Victorian Industries, 1880–1939 (1988)

Academic work
- Discipline: History
- Sub-discipline: Labour history Gender history War history
- Institutions: Australian National University (2017–); Monash University (2007–17); University of New South Wales (1992–2007); University of Auckland (1989–91); Murdoch University (1987–88)
- Notable works: The Politics of Work (1993); Women and the Great War (1997)

Raelene Frances, AM, FASSA (born 1955) is an Australian historian and academic at the Australian National University.

== Early life and education ==
Frances was born in Collie, Western Australia as Raelene Frances Anderson in 1955. She left Collie Senior High School in 1972, having been dux that year and winning a University of Western Australia Exhibition in History and a Commonwealth scholarship.

Frances graduated from the University of Western Australia with a Bachelor of Arts with Honours in 1978 and completed her Master of Arts two years later at the same university, her thesis being Prostitution in Perth and Fremantle and on the Eastern Goldfields, 1895–1939. She subsequently gained a Doctor of Philosophy from Monash University in 1989 with her thesis, The Politics of Work: Case Studies of Three Victorian Industries, 1880–1939, which was the basis of her first book.

== Career ==
Frances lectured at Murdoch University in 1987–88 before moving to the University of Auckland, where she spent three years as lecturer. In 1992 she was appointed lecturer at the University of New South Wales, later being promoted senior lecturer and then associate professor and head of the School of History. From 1987 to 1999 she shared all of her academic appointments with her partner, Bruce Scates. In 2007 she was appointed Dean of Arts and professor of history at Monash University.

Frances became dean of College of the Arts and Social Sciences and professor of history at the Australian National University in 2017.

In addition to her university positions, Frances has been a council member of the National Museum of Australia and board member of the Council for the Arts, Humanities and Social Sciences and of the Australasian Council of Deans of Arts, Social Sciences and Humanities. A member of the Australian Historical Association, from 2002 to 2004 she was a member of its Federal Executive. Other professional memberships include the History Educators Network of Australia and the Australian Society for the Study of Labour History, of which she was Federal President from 2003 to 2007. From 1998 to 2000 she was the President of the University of New South Wales Branch of the National Tertiary Education Union and from 2000 to 2004 a member of the University of New South Wales Council. She serves on numerous scholarship selection committees and chairs the Tuckwell Scholarship Selection Committee.

== Awards and recognition ==
Frances was elected a Fellow of the Academy of the Social Sciences in Australia (FASSA) in 2011. She was appointed Member of the Order of Australia (AM) in the 2020 Australia Day Honours for “significant service to history studies as a teacher, researcher and author”. In 2000 she received the Edna Ryan Award for services to women workers. In 2008 she received an Award for Excellence in Academia from the Australian Intercultural Society for promoting interfaith teaching, research and dialogue. In 2010 the Mayor of Bandung, Indonesia, gave her an Appreciation Award for strengthening educational and cultural ties between Bandung and Australia.

Frances' first book, The Politics of Work, won the Hancock Prize, awarded by the Australian Historical Association, while Women and the Great War won the New South Wales Premier's Children's History Prize in 1998 and Selling Sex was shortlisted for the Ernest Scott History Prize. In 2015 she received the Labour History Prize for the best article in the journal, Labour History, in the two years 2013–14, for ‘Authentic Leaders: Women and Leadership in Australian Unions before World War II’

Frances has been recognised as an outstanding teacher through university, state and national teaching awards, all of which have been shared with her partner, Bruce Scates.

== Personal ==
Frances is married to fellow historian Bruce Scates, with whom she has written a number of journal articles and books and with whom she shares a number of teaching excellence awards.

== Bibliography ==
=== Author ===
- — (1993). The Politics of Work: Gender and Labour in Victoria 1880–1939. Cambridge: Cambridge University Press. ISBN 0521401992.
- —; Scates, Bruce (1993). Women at Work in Australia from the Gold Rushes to World War II. Cambridge: Cambridge University Press. ISBN 0521387698.
- —; Scates, Bruce (1997). Women and the Great War. Cambridge: Cambridge University Press. ISBN 052146918X.
- — (2007). Selling Sex: A Hidden History of Prostitution. Sydney: University of New South Wales Press. ISBN 9780868409016.

=== Editor ===
- —; Scates, Bruce, eds. (2016). Beyond Gallipoli: New Perspectives on Anzac. Clayton: Monash University Publishing. ISBN 9781925495102.
