= Malmsjön =

Lake in Sweden

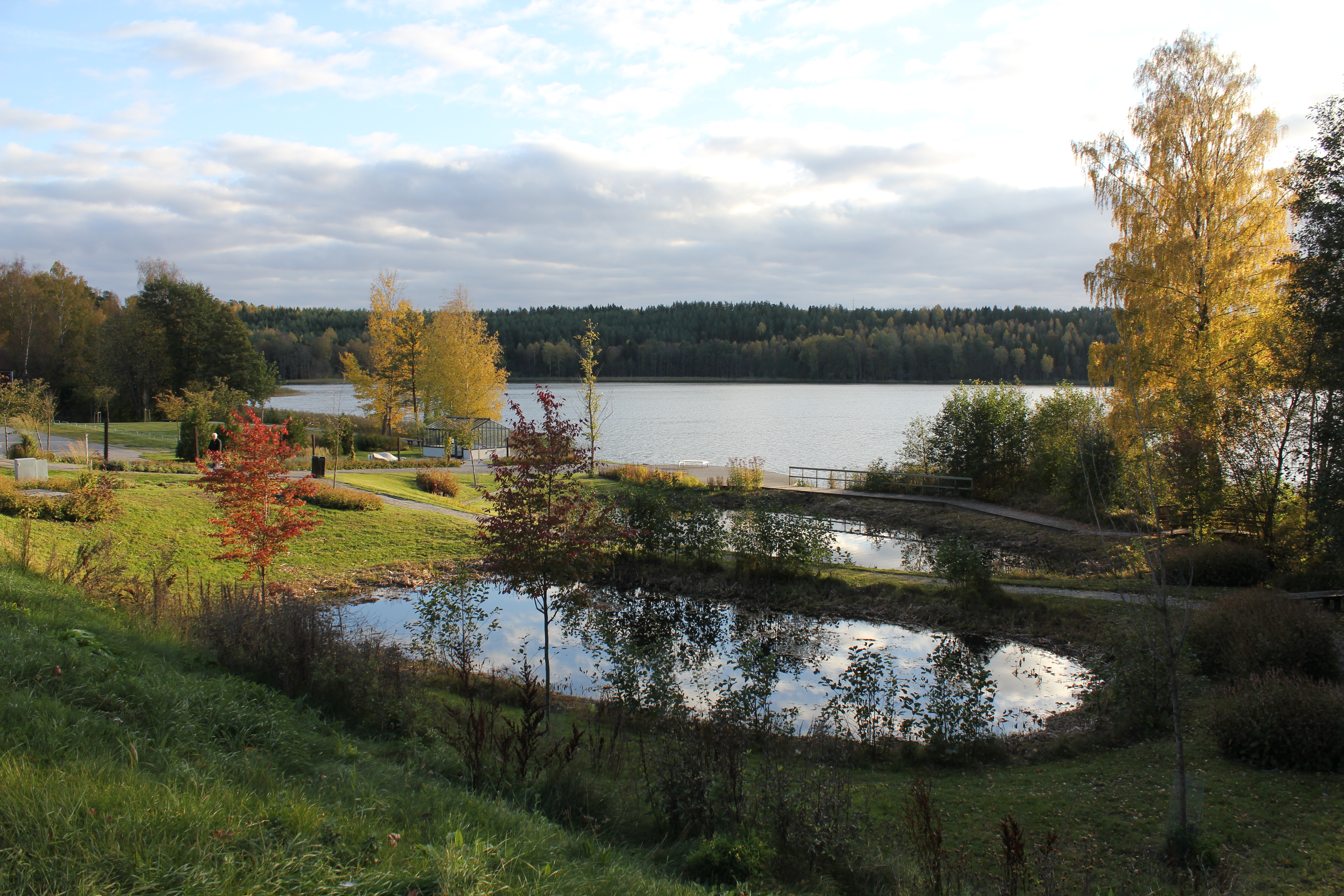

- Location within Stockholm
- Coordinates: 59°09′41″N 17°47′33″E
- Basin countries: Sweden

Malmsjön is a lake in Stockholm County, Södermanland, Sweden.
