= Kagghamraåns sjösystem =

Lake system in Sweden

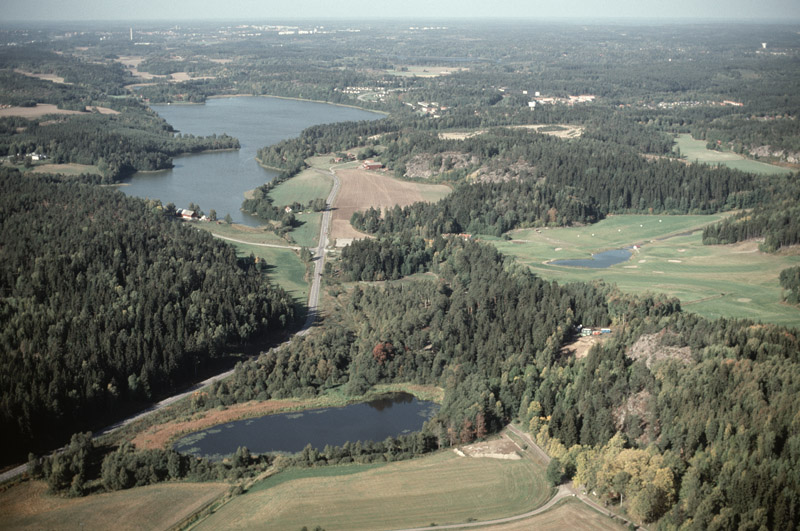
- Aerial view of Gölan and Malmsjön, two of the lakes forming the system

- Location within Stockholm
- Coordinates: 59°08′N 17°49′E
- Basin countries: Sweden

The Kagghamraåns sjösystem is a system of lakes in Stockholm county, Södermanland, Sweden.

== Lakes ==
The lake system comprises the following lakes:

- Axaren
- Bocksjön
- Brosjön
- Bysjön
- Getaren
- Gölan
- Lilla Skogssjön
- Malmsjön
- Mellansjön
- Somran
- Stora Skogssjön
- Övrasjön
