= Axaren =

Lake in Sweden

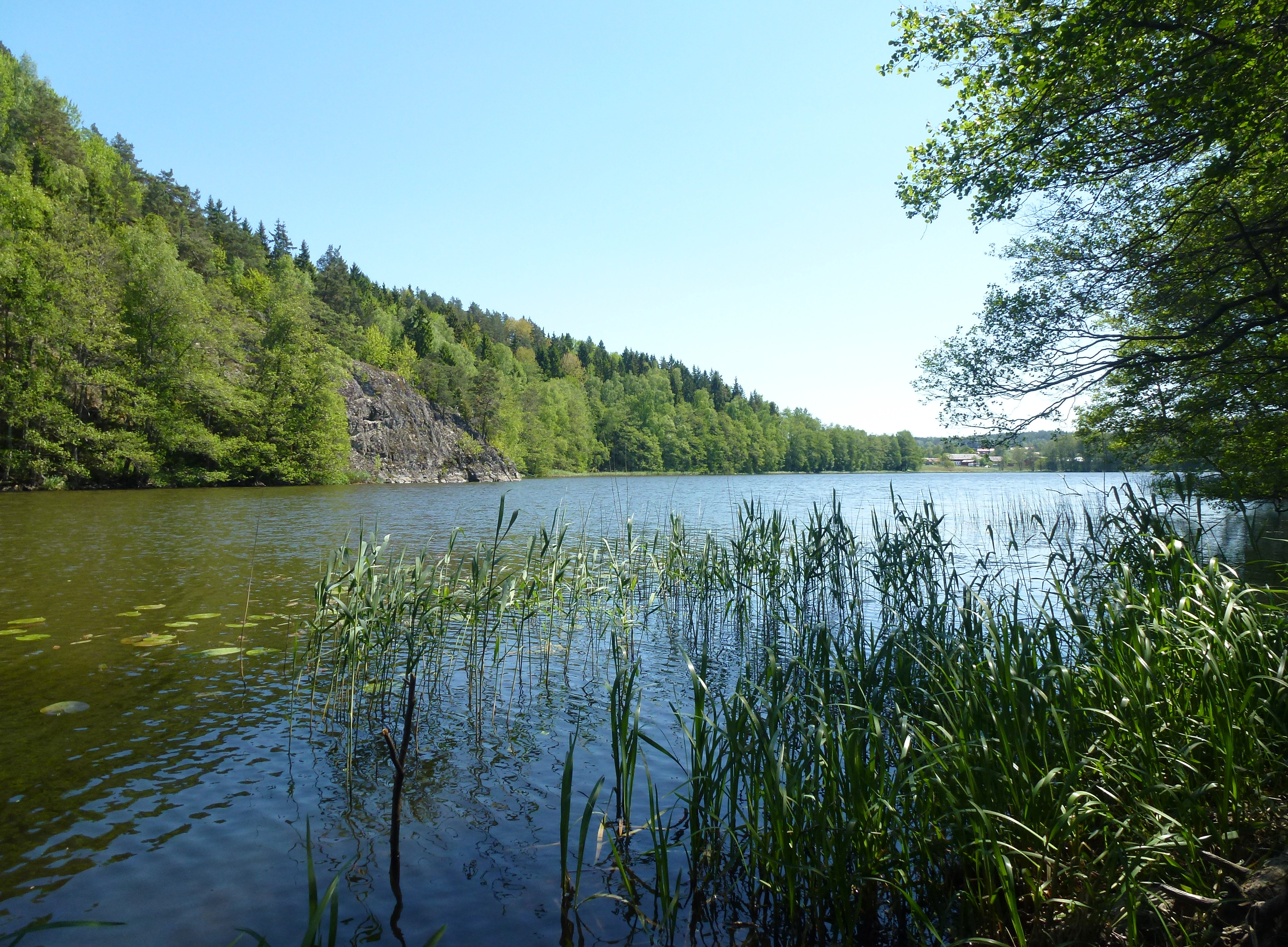
- Sjön Axaren i Botkyrka kommun

- Location within Stockholm
- Coordinates: 59°8′39″N 17°50′10″E
- Basin countries: Sweden

Axaren is a lake in Stockholm County, Södermanland, Sweden. It forms part of the Kagghamraåns sjösystem.
