= Lilla Skogssjön =

Lake in Sweden

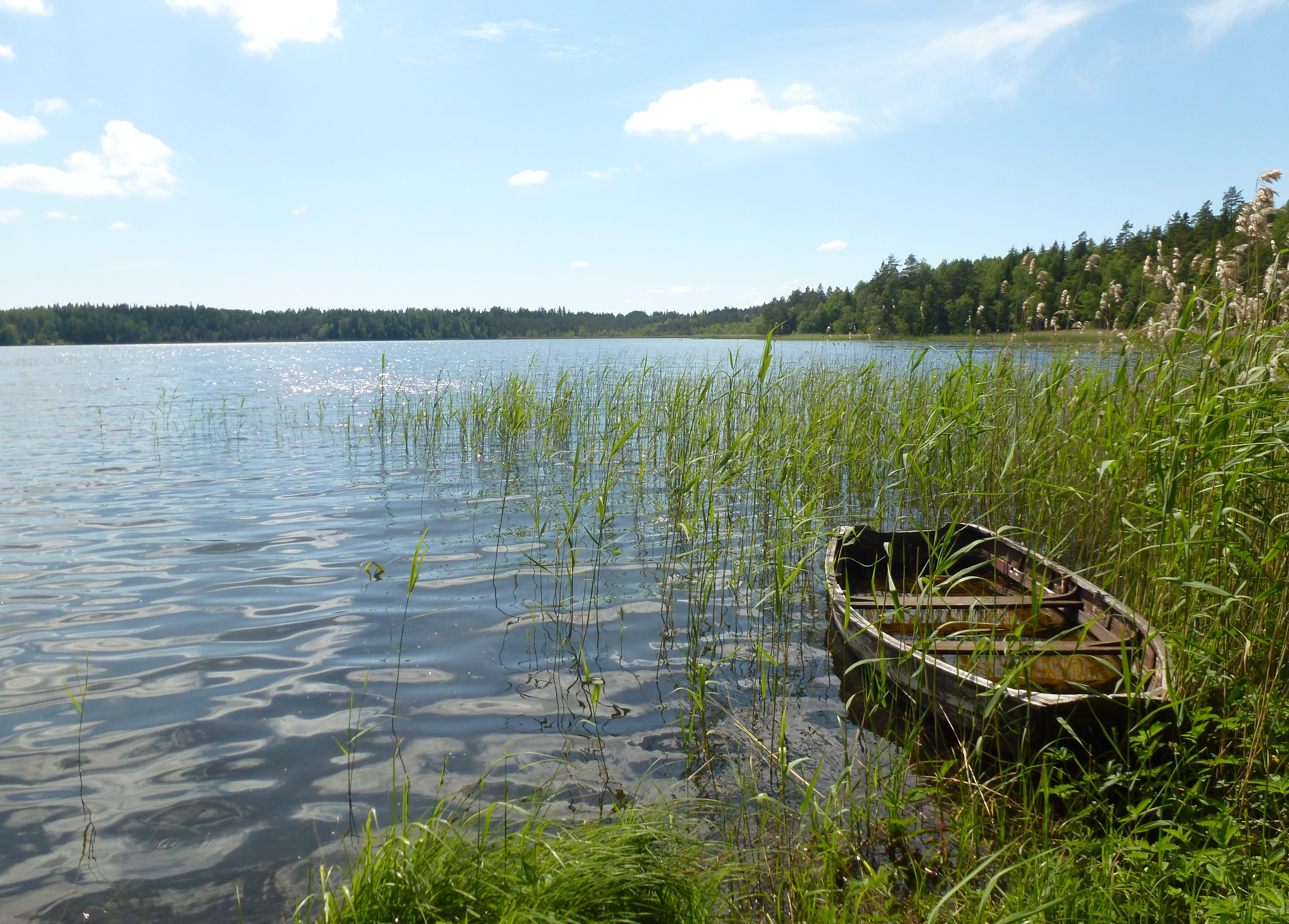

- Location within Stockholm Location within Sweden
- Coordinates: 59°08′N 17°54′E
- Basin countries: Sweden

Lilla Skogssjön is a lake in Stockholm county, Södermanland, Sweden. It lies just south of the larger Stora Skogssjön.
