= Getaren =

Lake in Sweden

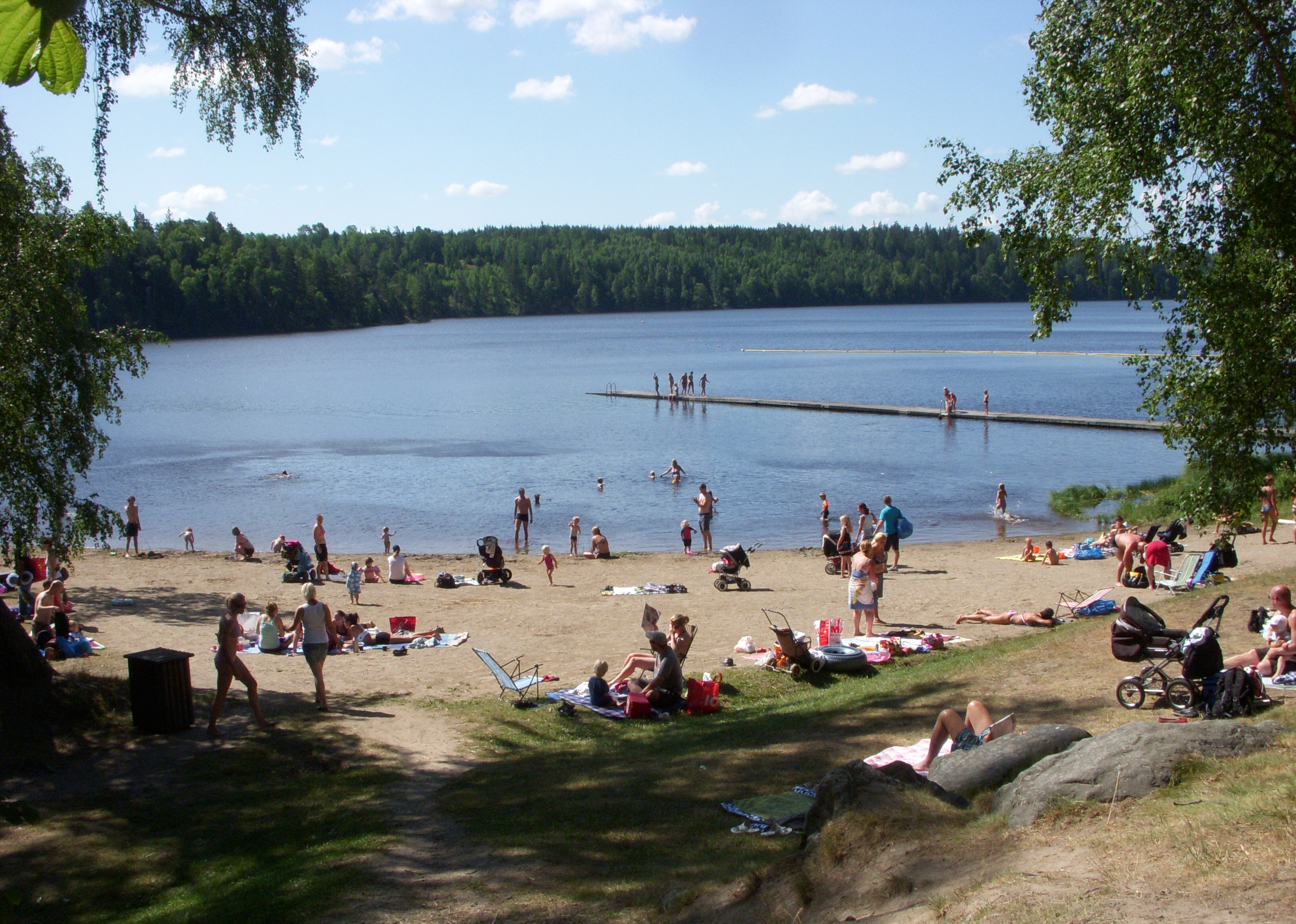
- Bathers at Lida friluftsgård

- Location within Stockholm
- Coordinates: 59°09′N 17°52′E
- Basin countries: Sweden

Getaren is a lake in Stockholm County, Södermanland, Sweden.
