= Somran =

Lake in Sweden

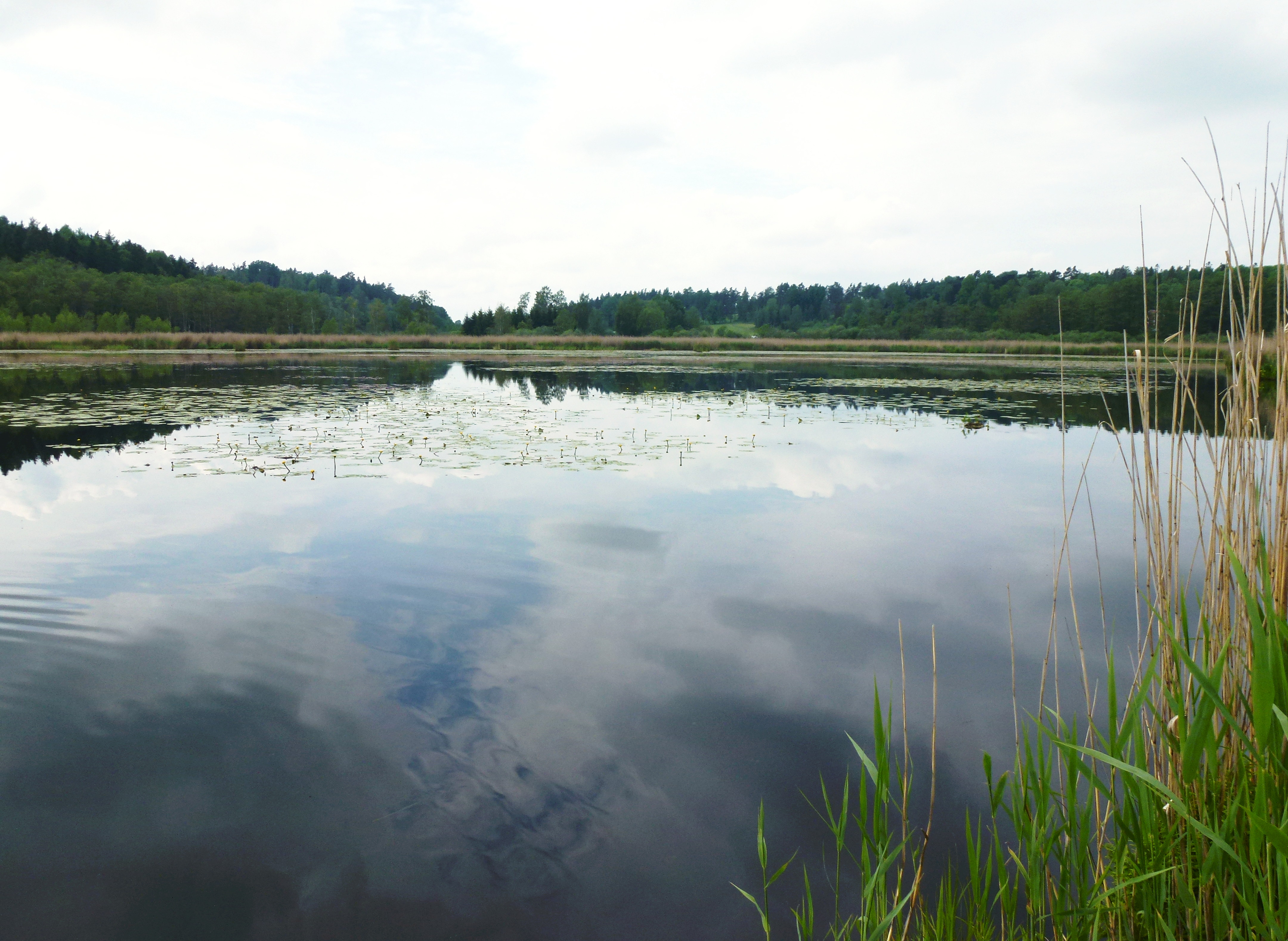

- Location within Stockholm
- Coordinates: 59°09′48″N 17°45′56″E
- Basin countries: Sweden

Somran is a lake in Stockholm County, Södermanland, Sweden.
