= Stora Skogssjön =

Lake in Sweden

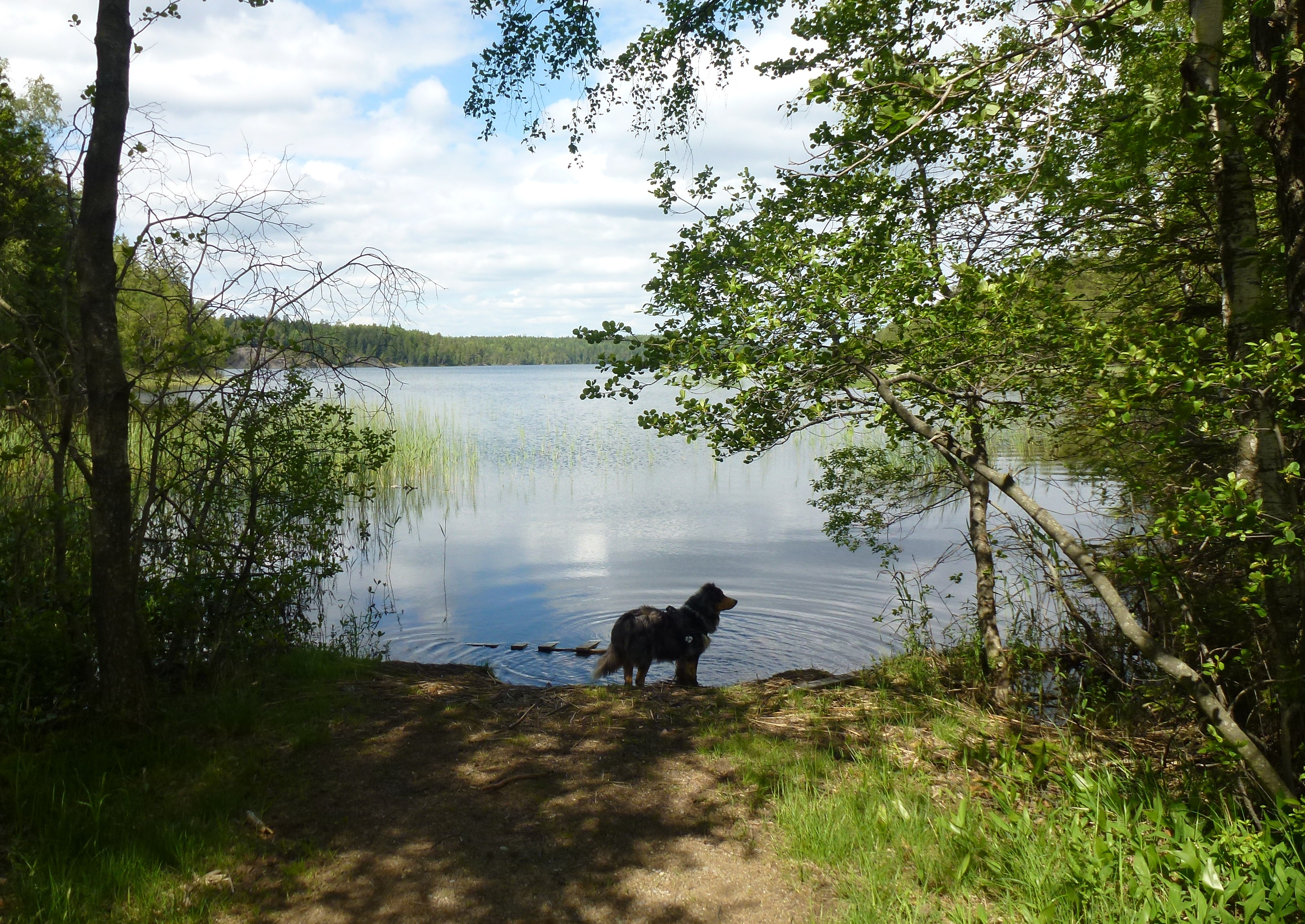
- Stora Skogssjön lake

- Location within Stockholm
- Coordinates: 59°09′N 17°54′E
- Basin countries: Sweden

Stora Skogssjön is a lake in Stockholm County, Södermanland, Sweden. It lies just north of the smaller Lilla Skogssjön.
