= Race (French Constitution) =

French notion of race

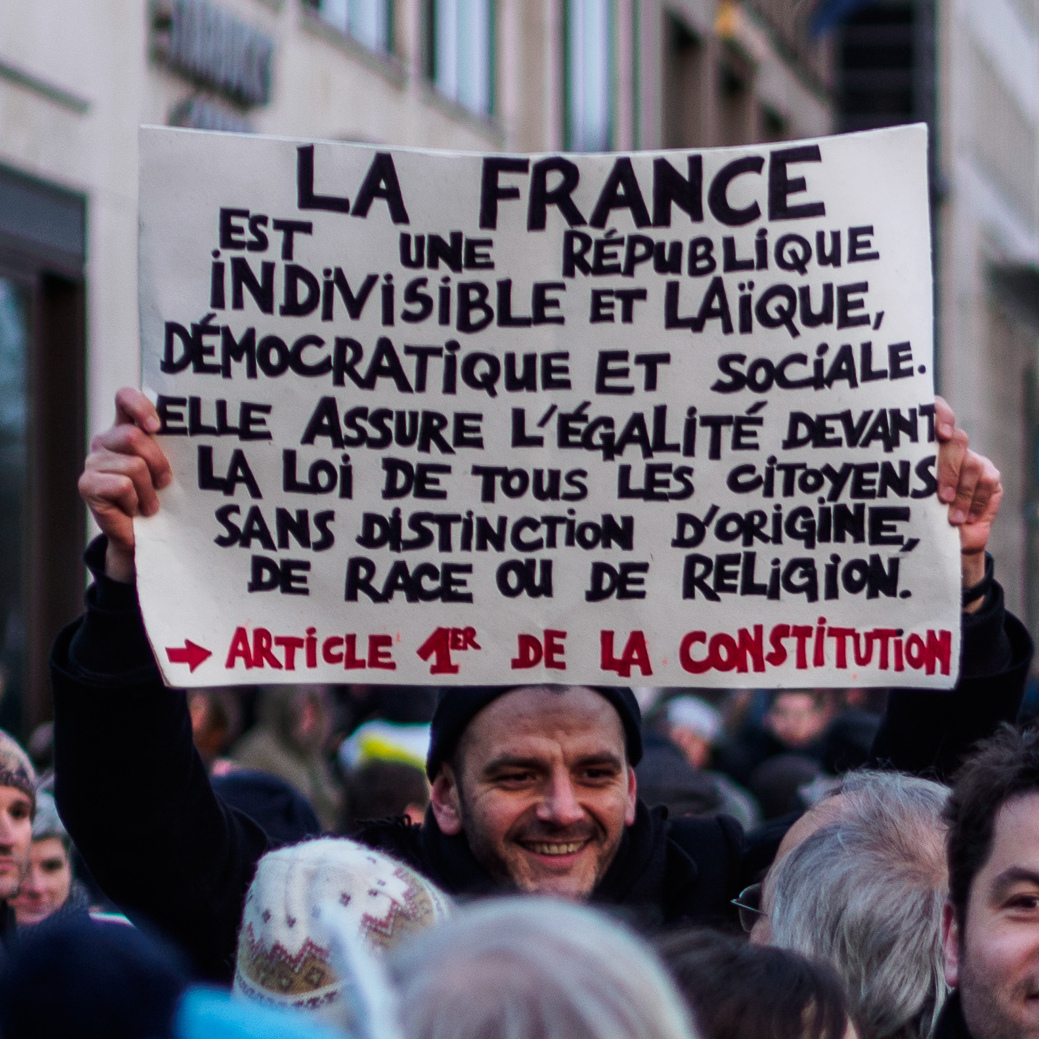
Sign held up at a demonstration in 2015.

The term race as used in Article One of the French Constitution, which states that France "ensures equality for all citizens without distinction of origin, race, or religion", has been the subject of numerous challenges from across the political spectrum. Nevertheless, no amendments to this wording have been successful since the 2000s.

One challenge arises because the noun race is not defined in official texts and has taken on many meanings in French. It is a technical term in the natural sciences, a pseudo-concept in racist discourse, a reference to The Holocaust, and a sociological and legal tool. The proposed removal of the term from the Constitution—and more broadly from French criminal law—is driven by a desire to erase the legitimizing effect that mentioning race confers to the concept. However, this removal also risks weakening the denunciation of racism.

In France, this debate has been a significant point of contention among anti-racist activists and political figures for decades. Arguments for and against removing the term from the Constitution have persisted since the early 1990s, and the discussions are often highly charged. Some have criticized the word race for its historical connotations or its evocation of a supposed biological reality that has been disproven by scientific evidence. In contrast, others have employed the term in its sociological sense, emphasizing its utility in combating racism.

== Origin of the text ==
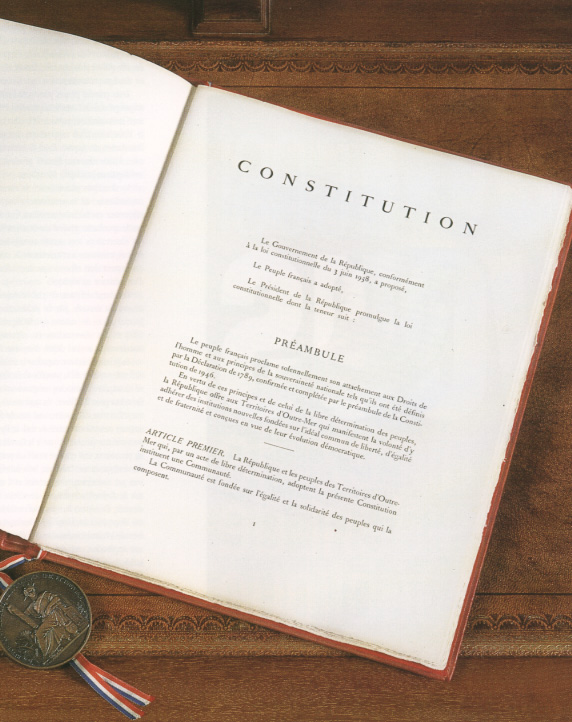
The Constitution of the Fifth Republic.

France is an indivisible, secular, democratic, and social Republic. It ensures equality before the law for all citizens without distinction of origin, race, or religion. It respects all beliefs.

— Article One of the current Constitution.

The phrase "without distinction of race" was originally located in the first paragraph of Article 2 of the French Constitution. It was later relocated to Article 1 of the French Constitution by the constitutional amendment of 4 August 1995.

The term race was not included in the preliminary draft of 29 July 1958, adopted by the government and drafted under the authority of General de Gaulle and the Minister of Justice, Michel Debré. However, the Council of Ministers incorporated it into the final draft on 3 September, possibly as a last-minute addition to circumvent potential controversy surrounding its absence. The identity of the minister who proposed this modification remains uncertain.

The 1946 Constitution only used the word race in the first sentence of its preamble: "…the French people proclaim again that every human being, without distinction of race, religion, or belief, possesses inalienable and sacred rights." This sentence was added by the Constitutional Commission chaired by socialist André Philip, and the wording of the first paragraph was adopted by a show of hands on 28 August 1946, without anyone in the Assembly perceiving it as anything other than a condemnation of racism. A few months earlier, in the April 1946 draft prepared in March, three attempts to include race or racial discrimination had been rejected.

Article 1 of the Declaration of the Rights of Man and of the Citizen of 1789, which constitutes part of the constitutional framework, states that "men are born and remain free and equal in rights" and that "social distinctions may only be based on common utility." This assertion was in contradiction with the continued practice of slavery, which was not abolished until 1794 and definitively in 1848. Some members of the Assembly were concerned that questioning slavery and the slave trade would result in the collapse of the kingdom and a return to the Ancien régime.

== Semantic analyses ==
From a linguistic standpoint, the wording of Article One is open to interpretation. It can be interpreted as "some classify humanity into races; French law does not recognize this classification", or "There are races, but the French Republic does not consider them in its treatment of citizens." The positioning of the word race within the list of origin/race/religion lends implicit validation to the existence of such races. This closed list affords significant weight to each of the three terms.

The term race was included in this list when the notion was widely accepted as a biological reality. It is juxtaposed with religion, which is not of the same nature, because, unlike differences in political opinions or languages, race and religion are frequently the basis for discrimination.

According to Arthur Joyeux, the phrase "without distinction of..." does not clarify the meaning of the sentence, as its beginning already states that it concerns "every human being." It merely emphasizes opposition to the decisions made by the Vichy regime.

== Early reservations ==
As early as 1950, shortly after the adoption of the Universal Declaration of Human Rights on 10 December 1948—which mentions race twice (Note: Universal Declaration of Human Rights: "Everyone is entitled to all the rights and freedoms outlined in this Declaration, without distinction of any kind, such as race, color, sex, language, religion, political or other opinion, national or social origin, property, birth, or other status. (Article 2) From the marriageable age, men and women, without any restriction based on race, nationality, or religion, have the right to marry and found a family. They have equal rights concerning marriage, during marriage, and at its dissolution. (Article 16)")—UNESCO experts argued that "the serious errors caused by the use [of this word] in common language make it desirable to abandon this term when applied to the human species." They recommended using "ethnic groups" instead, although this term is equally difficult to define.

In France, the complete elimination of the term race from legal texts became the subject of public debate from 1990 onwards, with the publication of the implementing decree for the Data Protection and Liberties Law : (Note: Article 31 of Law No. 78-17 January 6, 1978: "It is prohibited to store or retain in computerized memory, unless the person concerned expressly agrees, nominative data that directly or indirectly reveal racial origins, political, philosophical, or religious opinions, or trade union affiliations of individuals.") the legislation permitted judicial and administrative authorities to retain data that revealed an individual's "racial origins." (Note: Decree No. 90-115 of 2 February 1990, implementing the third paragraph of Article 31 of Law No. 78-17 January 6, 1978, on computers, files, and freedoms Article 1: "Judicial and administrative courts are authorized, for the exercise of their duties, to store or retain in computerized memory the nominative data necessary for the instruction and judgment of disputes brought before them and for the execution of judicial decisions, which directly or indirectly reveal the racial origins, political, philosophical, or religious opinions, or trade union affiliations of the parties involved in the dispute.") The term race was further discredited by the resurgence of the concept of "ethnic cleansing" during the Bosnian War and by the rediscovery of the "Jewish file" in Fontenay-sous-Bois.

The debate regularly resurfaced in Parliament from the early 2000s.

== Historico-legal background ==
The question of removing the concept of race from the Constitution inevitably gives rise to the issue of amending the entire body of legislation, particularly criminal law. The term race first emerged in French legislation in 1928 and subsequently in the period preceding World War II. It was subsequently employed by proponents and opponents of racist theories. To emphasize that the concept of the human race is biologically irrelevant, the term has been gradually replaced in anti-racist legislation by expressions such as "true or supposed race" or "so-called race."

The term race, which had long been absent from French legal vocabulary, first appeared in the Journal Officiel with the decree of 8 November 1928, (Note: Decree of 8 November 1928: Article 1: "Any individual born on the territory of Indochina, of parents, one of whom remains legally unknown, is presumed to be of French race, and may, by the provisions of this decree, obtain recognition of French nationality." Article 2: "The presumption that the father or mother, who remains legally unknown, is of French origin and race may be established by all means. The main elements of assessment are the name borne by the child, the fact that they have received a French education, training, and culture, and their position in society.") which permitted the naturalization of children born in Indochina to a French father who had not acknowledged them and an indigenous mother, contingent upon the presentation of evidence in court substantiating their affiliation with the "French race." This designation encompassed both biological and cultural criteria. To substantiate their claim to "Frenchness", legal experts considered a range of physical characteristics, including skin pigmentation, as well as cultural attributes such as politeness, participation in sports, and preferences for coastal or mountainous locales.

The term race was subsequently employed in the Marchandeau decrees (Note: Decree-Law of 21 April 1939, Official Journal, 25 April 1939, p. 5295: "No reason based on race or religion can disrupt the equality of citizens; no exception arising from a hereditary circumstance can affect, concerning any one of them, the feeling of fraternity that unites all members of the French family (Report to the President of the French Republic). Article 1: Articles 32 and 33 of the law of July 29, 1881 on press freedom are amended as follows: Article 32: Defamation [...] committed against a group of people [...] who belong, by their origin, to a particular race or religion, shall be punished.") of 21 April 1939, which were designed to restrict Nazi propaganda by imposing penalties on defamation in the press against "a group of persons belonging by their origin to a particular race or religion with the intent of inciting hatred among citizens." The explanatory text for this decree indicated that race or religion was to be understood based on origin ("a hereditary circumstance").

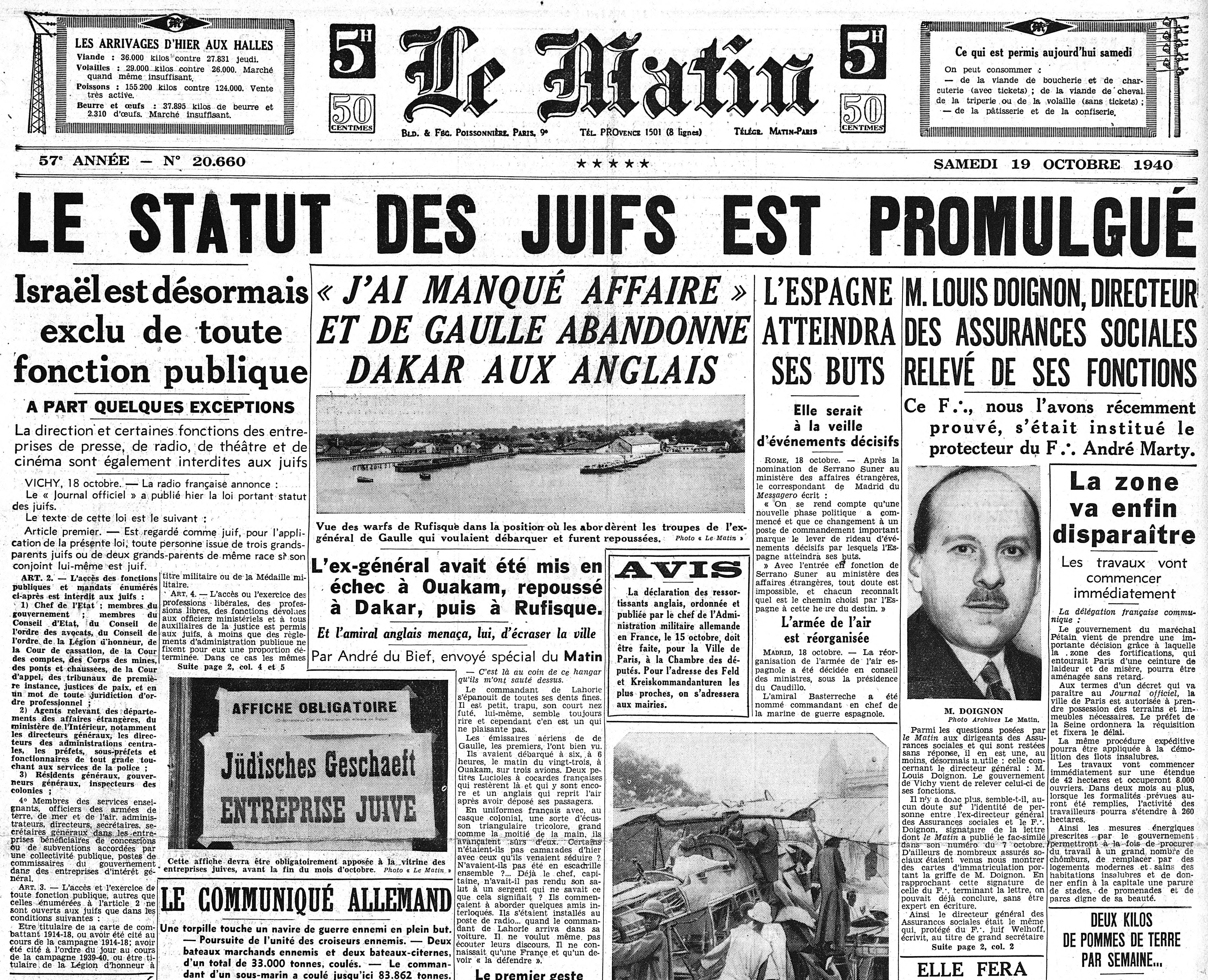
Front page of the newspaper Le Matin, 19 October 1940, announcing the promulgation of the Statute of the Jews.

The Vichy regime revoked the Marchandeau decrees and enacted the law that established the "status of Jews." This law employed the term race to implement antisemitic policies by defining the criteria for belonging to the "Jewish race."

The inclusion of the phrase "without distinction of race" in the preamble of the 1946 Constitution and later in the 1958 Constitution was a direct response to the racial theories that had been used to justify the Holocaust and which had underpinned Nazism.

The legislation enacted on 1 July 1972, which was designed to combat racism, prohibited the consideration of an individual's racial identity. This prohibition was not intended to establish an objective or official definition of race; rather, it was intended to prevent the targeting of specific groups of people based on their racial identity. Consequently, the assertion that "races" are inherently unequal, as Jean-Marie Le Pen said in 1996, remains a valid position.

By the late 1970s, the scientific community had reached a consensus that the concept of race is irrelevant when applied to the human species. During the trial of Klaus Barbie, Albert Jacquard posited that the term "human race" is devoid of meaning, as it is impossible to define races without falling into complete scientific arbitrariness.

The term "belonging, true or supposed, to a race" was introduced into French legislation on 7 June 1977, as a complement to the 1972 law. Nevertheless, the Gayssot Law of 13 July 1990, proscribed "any discrimination based on belonging or not belonging to an ethnic group, nation, race, or religion." (Note: Similarly, the Auroux laws introduced in 1982 in the Labor Code a provision prohibiting the sanctioning or dismissal of an employee "on the grounds of their origin […] or their belonging to an ethnicity, nation, or race" (Article L. 122-45). The law of 13 July 1983, regarding the rights and obligations of civil servants reiterates the prohibition against making distinctions between civil servants "on the grounds of their opinions […] or their ethnic affiliation.") The expression "true or supposed race" was only generalized after the 1994 criminal code reform led by Robert Badinter. Clémence Lavigne posited that the adjective "true" introduced ambiguity and should be removed. Bernard Herszberg, a representative of the association Galilée 90, which advocates for the removal of the word race from the Constitution, expressed regret that the formulation "belonging […] to a particular race"—whether "true or supposed"—relativized the notion of belonging without affecting the race itself.

In a 2007 ruling on the law of 20 November 2007, regarding immigration control, integration, and asylum, the Constitutional Council stated that the prohibition on distinctions outlined in Article One of the Constitution barred the collection of statistical data based on "ethnic origin or race", even for research purposes.

The expression "so-called race", which underscores the notion that "races" are a mere construct and that it is not French lawmakers who invoke the concept of "race", but rather those who espouse racist ideologies, has been used in Belgian legislation since 2003. However, it was only in 2016 that this terminology was introduced in French legislation. (Note: Internal Security Code (dissolution of associations), Penal Code (in 2016 for the article on discrimination, in 2017 for "hate crimes" and non-public hate speech), the 2008 transversal anti-discrimination law (in 2016) and the Labor Code (in 2017).)

In 2021, French anti-racist legislation was expanded to prohibit not only the consideration of so-called "race" as a basis for discrimination, but also any consideration of this so-called race, even for affirmative action.

The decree of 10 October 2023, concerning the implementation of the "Information System for Monitoring Priority Criminal Policies" (SISPoPP), authorizes the collection of "data revealing racial or ethnic origin." This authorization has prompted several unions and associations to petition the Council of State to ban the system.

== Arguments pro and con ==
Since the 1990s, a number of proposals have been put forth to remove the term race from either all legislative texts or solely from Article One of the Constitution. An examination of the proceedings of a 1992 symposium dedicated to this issue reveals that the arguments and counterarguments presented have remained largely unchanged. While there is a consensus that the negative connotations associated with the term race should be condemned, there is also a recognition that the removal of the term could potentially have the unintended consequence of undermining anti-racist efforts.

=== Historical ===
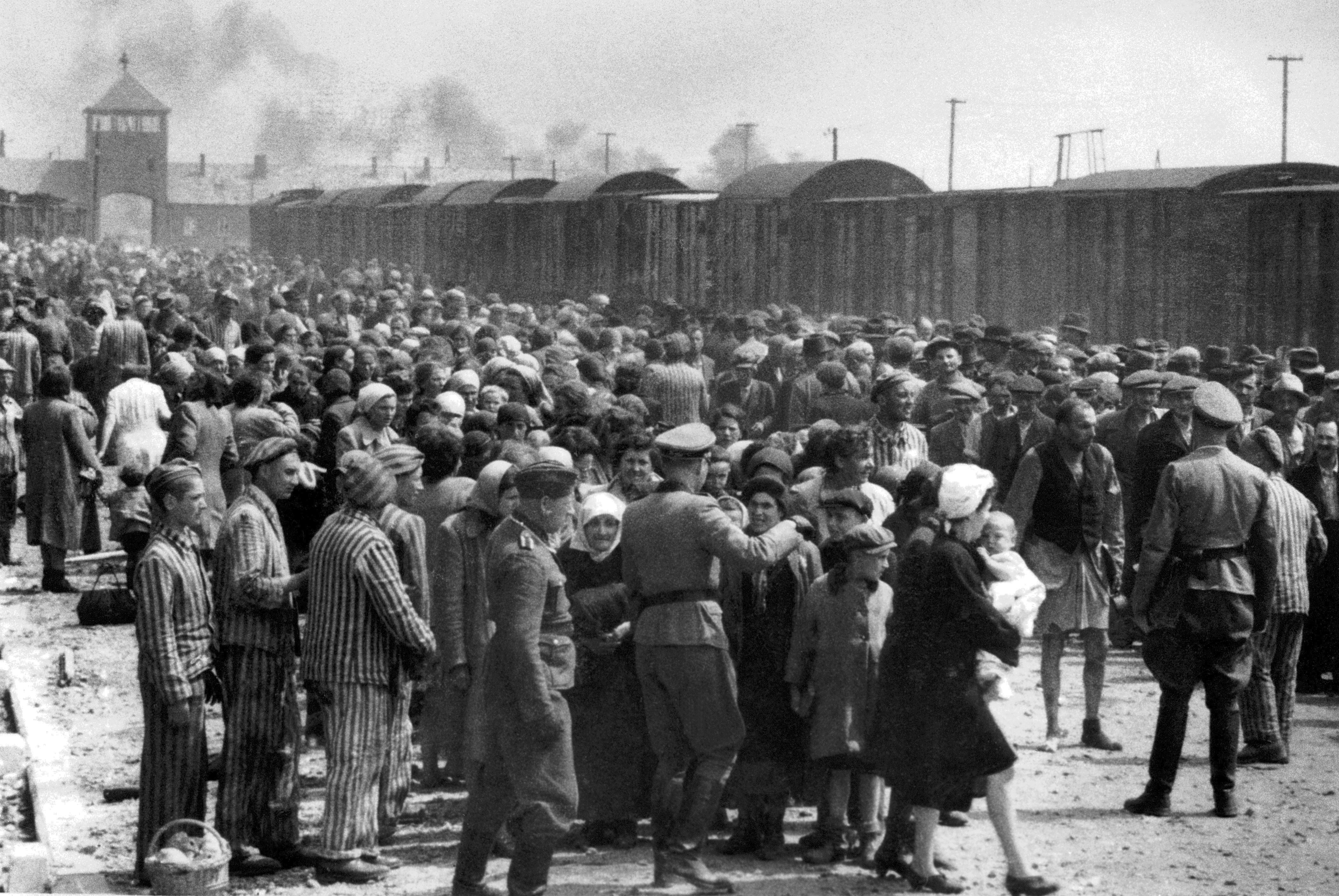
The Auschwitz-Birkenau camp in May or June 1944.

I am pleased with the removal of the word race, a term under which not only were the worst theories in human history constructed, but they were also implemented during the first half of the 20th century.

— Éric Coquerel (La France Insoumise)

This is an opportunity to strike the word race from our Constitution. For years, our fellow citizens have relegated it to the dustbin of history, as it represents concepts and values that are no longer theirs.

— Jean-Yves Bony (Les Républicains)

Public law professor Gwénaële Calvès notes the pervasiveness of historical references in discussions surrounding the removal of the term race from legal discourse. Mario Stasi, the president of LICRA since 2017, articulated in 2018 that the term race should be eliminated from the legal framework, emphasizing that its presence in the Constitution reflects a historical era when its usage was prevalent. The Constitution was drafted during a period when racial distinctions were widely accepted as factual.

Magali Bessone offers a counterargument, proposing that racism persists because it is not merely an issue of outdated concepts and values. Calvès asserts that the historical argument is inadequate for justifying a revision of Article 1, as it is evident that the term is not employed in its genocidal sense within the French law context. In contrast to the Vichy regime, where race was defined in legal texts, it is currently used in a context of negation. Legal scholar Clémence Lavigne posits that this usage implies that lawmakers do not recognize any classification of humanity into different races.

=== Biological ===
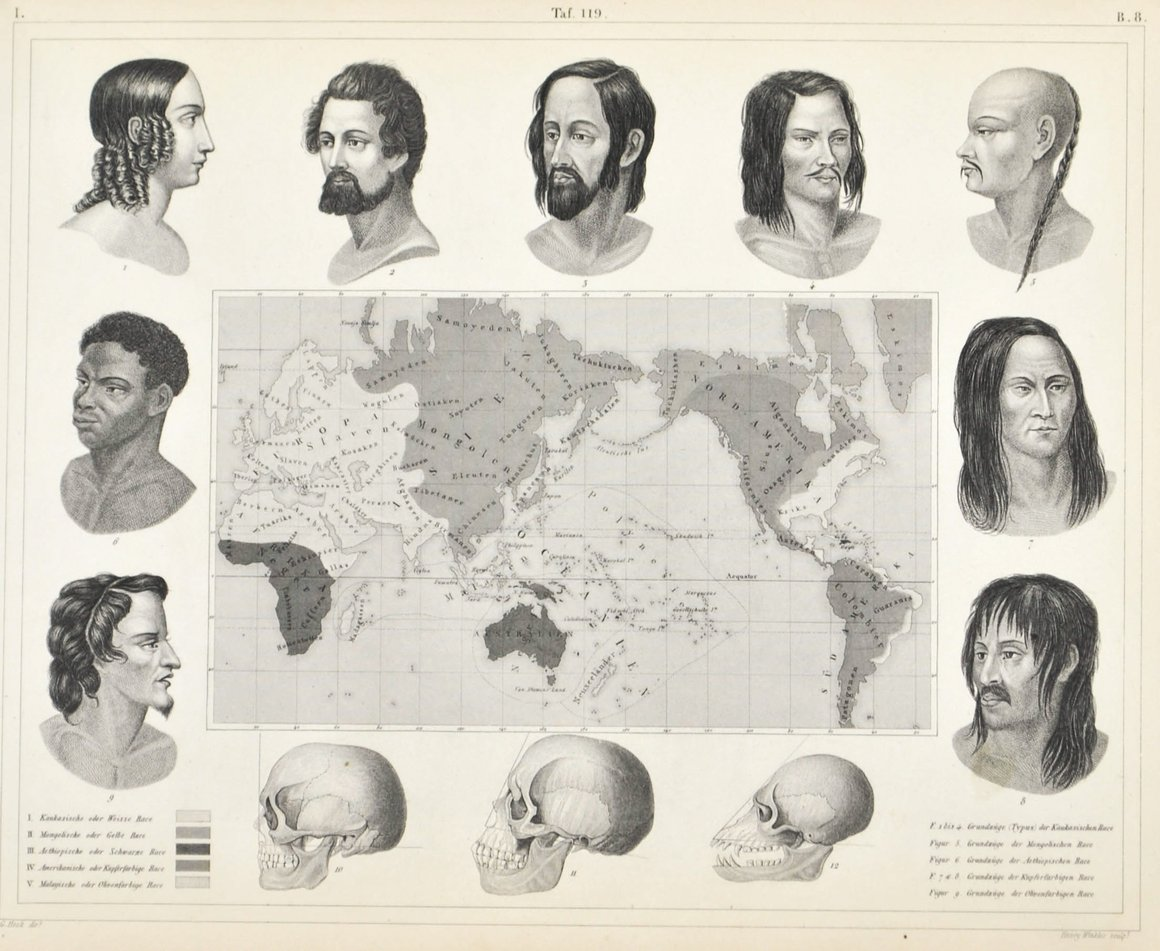
Varieties of Mankind (Iconographic Encyclopedia of Science, Literature and Art – 1851), a map based on the theories of anthropologist Johann Friedrich Blumenbach, who asserted in the 19th century that humans are the same species, and that races are equal as long as they are equal in opportunity.

This argument posits that, since the scientific validity of the concept of the human race has been refuted, using the word race in the Constitution creates a contradiction between law and science that must be resolved.

This contradiction between law and science can no longer persist.

— Michel Vaxès (PCF), in the rationale for his 2003 bill

A variation of this argument seeks to align the Constitution with a fundamental anthropological truth:

Sixty years ago, Claude Lévi-Strauss declared that there was only one race, that of humanity as a whole. Removing the word race acknowledges human beings in their shared humanity, culture, and dignity.

— Serge Letchimy (Martinican Progressive Party, affiliated with the Socialist group in the National Assembly)

In contrast, the drafters of the 1972 law on combating racism (commonly, though inaccurately, referred to as the Pleven Law) — initiated to align French legislation with the International Convention on the Elimination of All Forms of Racial Discrimination — and the Gayssot Law (1990) asserted that the law must provide the means to combat racism precisely because race does not exist.

Some legal scholars posit that the law does not merely reflect reality; rather, it is the law that creates the world, particularly through fundamental principles such as the declaration that "all men are born and remain free and equal in rights." It is therefore imperative that the discourses of science and law be kept distinct: racism is not penalized because it is a false theory, but rather because it is deemed inimical to the democratic values enshrined in the Constitution. Geneticist Albert Jacquard also posits that "the issue of racism is not a scientific problem but a philosophical and moral challenge." Furthermore, he asserts that the scientific evidence disproving the existence of biological races is unlikely to persuade those who perceive differences in others daily. Jacquard adds that biology cannot provide a scientific foundation for the philosophical conviction of equal human dignity.

Moreover, the possibility of essentializing the concept of race persists, including in scientific literature. Many researchers caution that relying on biological arguments is a double-edged sword. If new scientific discoveries were to validate the notion of "biological race", it would challenge the notion that racism must be repressed on the grounds of its falsehood.

=== Pedagogical ===
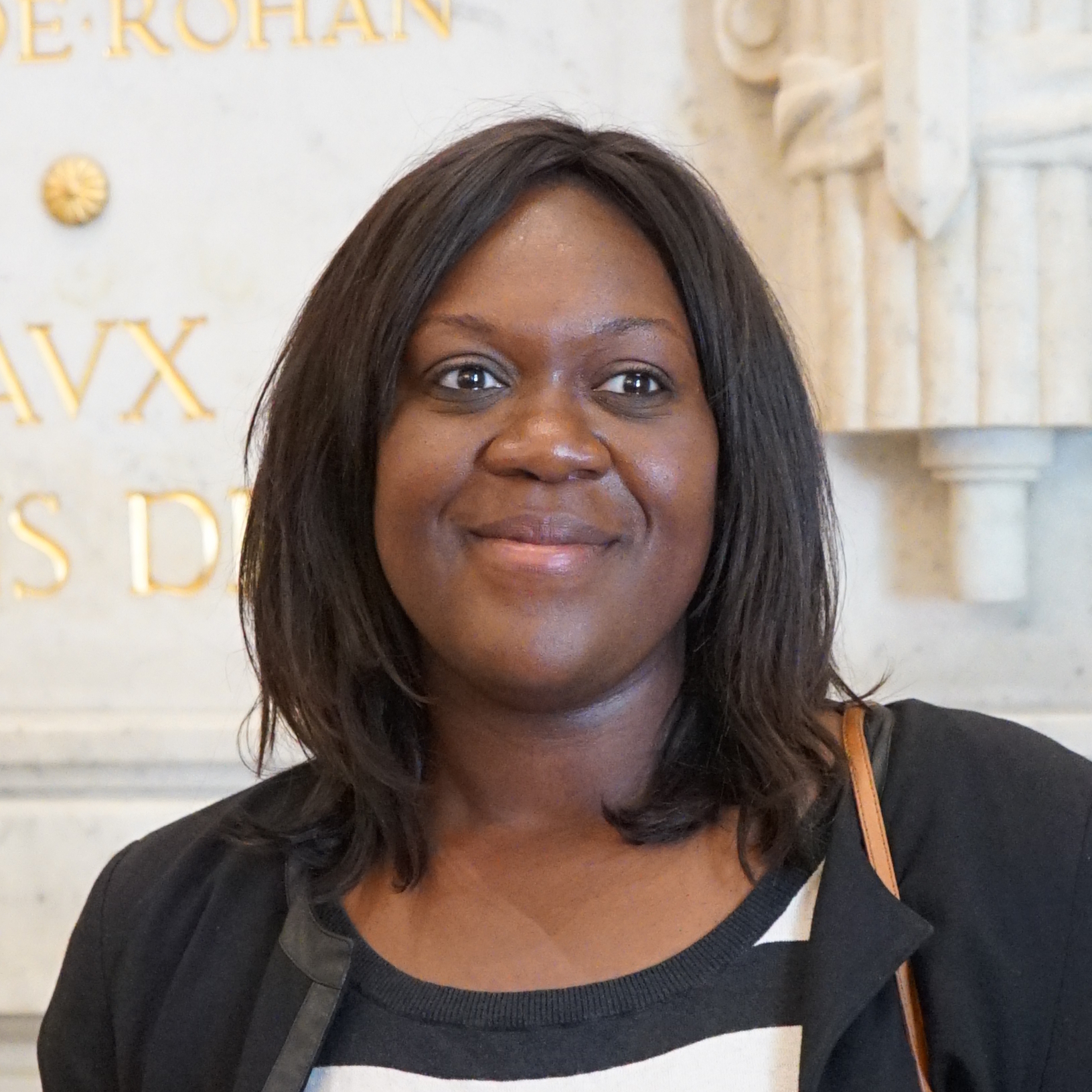
Laetitia Avia in 2017.

It is not about replacing the word race with others: it is about removing it, eradicating it. No concept of race should persist in our society.

— Laetitia Avia (LREM deputy, chair of the mission to combat racism and anti-Semitism on the internet)

In 2013, communist deputy François Asensi addressed the National Assembly, explaining that the presence of the word in the law contributes to "normalizing its use, even among the youngest of our citizens," and gives "racist discourse [a] form of legitimization."

As posited by Gwénaële Calvès, the notion that racism is correlated with a dearth of knowledge regarding scientific advancement may have been a pivotal factor in the discussions that culminated in the criminalization of Holocaust denial in 1990.

=== Symbolic ===
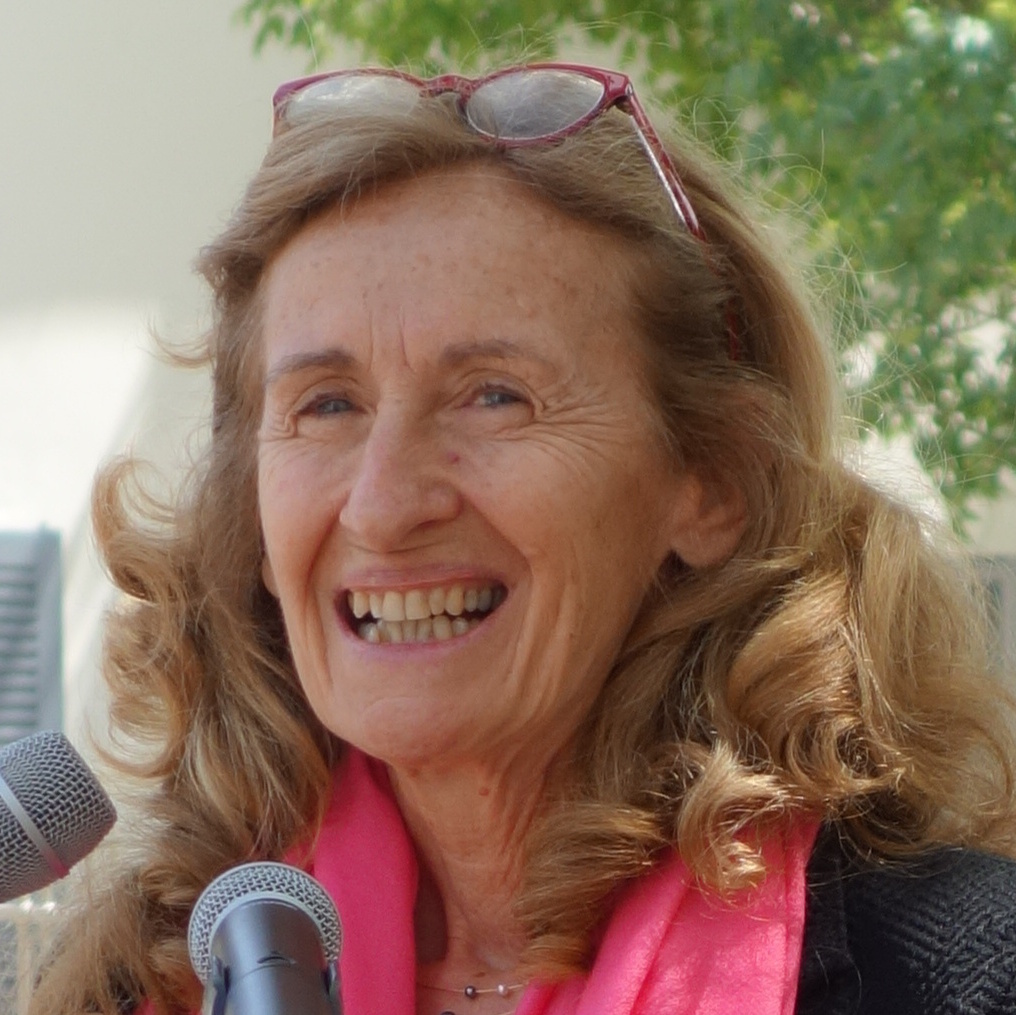
Nicole Belloubet in 2018. She was Minister of Justice at the time of the National Assembly's vote on the constitutional law "for a more representative, accountable and effective democracy", which planned to remove the word "race" from Article 1 of the Constitution (project abandoned).

The legal significance is strong. Removing the word race is, of course, a powerful symbol.

— Nicole Belloubet (Minister of Justice in the second Philippe government, under President Emmanuel Macron)

The signal that France sends to the world will necessarily be seen as perfect.

— Gabriel Serville (deputy from French Guiana, member of the Democratic and Republican Left group)

This argument posits that the reformulation is performative, whereby the act of removing the term race from the equation is an explicit expression of equality among all citizens.

In contrast, philosopher Étienne Balibar posits that the symbol would be negative. He encourages consideration of the implications of a potential constitutional amendment in France that would remove the existing stipulation of equality before the law without distinction of race. Such a move, he argues, would symbolically eliminate a significant expression and condemnation of discrimination, as well as one of the key means of resisting its institutionalization. Constitutionalist François Borella posits that the removal of a word from our Constitution, which was originally introduced in reaction to Nazism and to condemn racial discrimination in the constitutions of all states and all international human rights treaties, would inevitably be interpreted in a manner contrary to the intentions of its proponents.

Regarding the aspiration of the expressivist interpretation of the law, political theory professor Cécile Laborde posits that "the crucial point is not what the government intends to convey, nor how citizens subjectively perceive the messages, but rather whether the government's messages objectively reflect appropriate attitudes towards citizens." In the context of Critical race theory, many scholars in France and the United States argue that eliminating race is an act of ignorance and the disqualification of situated knowledge, rather than a gesture of emancipation. They contend that the act of "naming race" (in its constructivist sense) most clearly expresses anti-racism. They further assert that removing the word means refusing to take the perspective of those concerned and risks erasing the trace of their discrimination.

=== Universalist ===
This rewriting of the first article of the Constitution, in accordance with our republican universalist tradition, would restore France to what it should never have ceased to be: a model for protecting citizens' equality before the law.

— Ferdinand Mélin-Soucramanien, professor of public law at the University of Bordeaux.

The elimination of the term is consistent with France's "color-blind" policy, which is based on the republican universalist ideal that combating racism necessitates the elimination of all attention to racial criteria.

Mario Stasi, the president of the LICRA, posits that the removal of the term race would assist in "countering those who endeavor to suggest the existence of a form of 'state racism' in France by citing Article 1 of our Constitution." He further posits that this is particularly crucial at a juncture when "identity-based threats" are giving rise to a resurgence of "neo-colonial" discourse, thereby reinvigorating the very concept of "race" and its attendant terminology, including "racialized workshops", "racially segregated union training", (Note: The phrase "racially segregated union training" refers to the controversy surrounding the activities of the SUD-Education union 93.) and "racial whiteness."

Legal scholar Danièle Lochak offers a contrasting perspective, proposing that universalism should be conceptualized not as a preexisting state, but as a goal to be pursued. She posits that universalism must be constructed upon accepting plural identities, rather than their negation. Lochak asserts that attempts to erase the concept of race are akin to a form of political correctness that creates the impression of action while failing to address the underlying issues. She situates herself within the ongoing discourse between those who advocate for a universalist anti-racism approach, which some critics have labeled as "moral", and those who favor a political anti-racism stance, which others have characterized as "identity-based." Lochak also cautions against the phenomenon of "reverse essentialism", which she believes risks confining individuals to fixed and exclusive identities.

=== Sociological ===
No, race doesn't exist. Yes, race exists. No, it's not what we say it is, but it remains the most tangible, real, and brutal of realities."

— Colette Guillaumin

The assertion that "human races do not exist" is predicated on a naturalistic interpretation of the concept, while simultaneously disregarding its socio-constructivist interpretation, which has been the dominant paradigm in French social sciences since the seminal work of sociologist Colette Guillaumin. Despite the lack of biological legitimacy attributed to race, it is a social construct and a social reality. Contemporary sociologists employ the concepts of racialization and racialism to describe race, emphasizing the racist process of othering.

In this context, the term race is widely used in the social sciences to describe a "powerful imaginary category" that serves to justify social hierarchies. Simone Bonnafous and Pierre Fiala posit that "the imaginary race has real effects in social practices, and Article 2 of the Constitution denies any legal validity to this imaginary race." Philosopher Chantal Delsol further asserts that "the law must not ignore social reality; it must account for even invented or irrational differences, especially those that matter."

Historian Pap Ndiaye defends the retention of the term race in the Constitution, emphasizing that the use of the racial category does not imply a questionable ontological commitment by legislators or scholars to the existence of "races." Rather, he asserts, it is a pragmatic use of a situated category to describe discriminatory phenomena.

=== Pragmatic ===
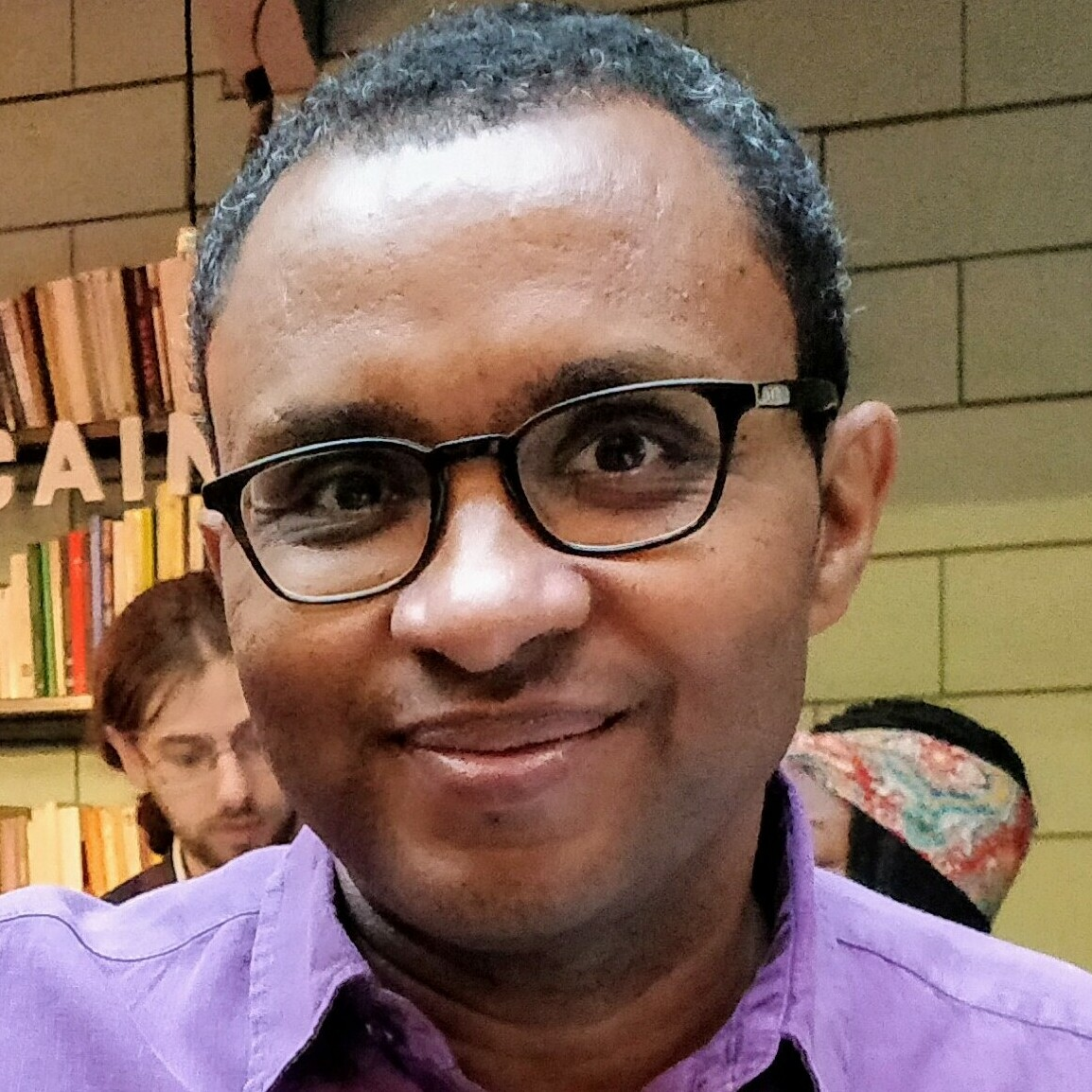
Pap Ndiaye in 2018. Historian, co-founder of the Representative Council of Black Associations and Minister of National Education from May 2022 to July 2023, he was strongly opposed in 2018 to the removal of the word "race" from Article 1 of the Constitution.

Many commentators have drawn attention to the potential risks associated with the weakening of anti-racist legislation if the term race is removed. These include constitutional scholar Didier Maus, law professors Bertrand Mathieu and Jean-Philippe Derosier, philosopher Éric Deschavanne, and historian Pap Ndiaye, who, in 2018, expressed opposition to the removal of the controversial term from Article 1, arguing that it would represent "one of those grand legislative gestures full of good intentions but with negative consequences."

Philosopher Pierre-André Taguieff characterizes the removal as a "symbolic victory", suggesting that it would also necessitate the removal of derivative terms like "racist", which could be interpreted as implying that racial discrimination is no longer prohibited. In 2013, Dominique Baudis, then the Defender of Rights, was consulted regarding a proposal to eliminate the concept of race from French legislation. He acknowledged the symbolic value of the project but expressed concern about its practical consequences. Similarly, philosopher Antonia Soulez warns that "the explicit denial, especially in a constitutional text, has the effective force of a stance against race as a criterion." She further states that "if the denial disappears, along with the word 'race,' the Constitution will no longer respond when, in the face of resurgent racism, it is needed."

Nevertheless, some scholars contend that the legal framework would remain robust even if race were removed from Article 1. In 1992, constitutional scholar Olivier Duhamel posited that incorporating a "rejection of racism" into the Constitution would permit the exclusion of race without compromising the efficacy of anti-racist legislation. In 2018, Minister of Justice Nicole Belloubet underscored the multitude of legal safeguards enshrined in the 1958 Constitution, which cites the 1946 Constitution and the 1789 Declaration of the Rights of Man and the Citizen, both of which are integral to the constitutional block. Nevertheless, Magali Bessone observes that Belloubet's remarks indicate that race is not an inherently antiquated category but rather a crucial legal instrument. Conversely, Françoise Vergès posits that the 1946 Constitution's preamble, which has never been invoked to challenge racial discrimination before the Constitutional Council, does not afford the same protection against racism as Article 1 of the 1958 Constitution.

== Attempts to remove the word ==
=== Legislative ===
Since 2002, at least ten legislative initiatives have been proposed to remove the term race from the French Constitution or penal code. Among these, one may cite a bill passed by the National Assembly in 2013 but never debated in the Senate, as well as a constitutional revision abandoned in 2018.

In November 2002, during the review of the constitutional bill on the decentralized organization of the Republic, Socialist Victorin Lurel proposed an amendment to remove the reference to race from the Constitution. This proposal was rejected by the UMP group. In March 2003, Communist deputy Michel Vaxès proposed an amendment to replace the terms race and racial in French legislation with "ethnicity" and "ethnic." However, the right-wing majority rejected this amendment, arguing that it would weaken the requirement to combat racism. In the same year, the Communist and Republican group in the National Assembly introduced a bill intending to remove the term race from French legislation. However, they specified that they had elected not to propose amendments to the preambles of the 1946 Constitution and the 1958 Constitution, which they regarded as the foundational texts of the Republic and therefore of historical significance. In 2004 and 2007, Victorin Lurel and the Socialist group once again presented a constitutional bill to eliminate the term race from Article 1 of the Constitution. Additionally, an amendment was proposed to replace the term race with "origins." These two initiatives were ultimately rejected by the National Assembly. On 15 May 2008, Arnaud Montebourg introduced another amendment during discussions on a constitutional reform aimed at modernizing the institutions of the Fifth Republic. This amendment sought to remove the term race from Article 1. However, the proposal faced significant opposition in the Senate, notably from Robert Badinter. Ultimately, the amendment was rejected by the rapporteur.

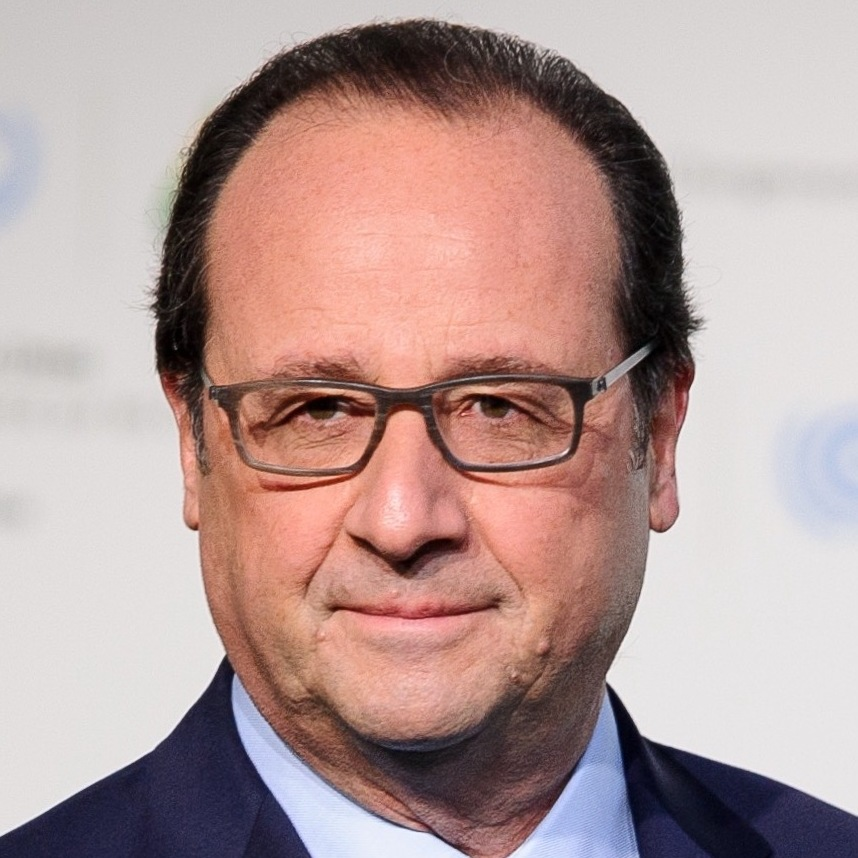
François Hollande (pictured here in 2015) pledged in 2012 to remove the word "race" from the Constitution.

During a public meeting on overseas territories in the 2012 presidential campaign, Socialist candidate François Hollande articulated a commitment to remove race from the Constitution, offering a rationale for this position.

The Republic does not fear diversity because diversity is movement, it is life. Diversity of backgrounds, origins, and colors, but not diversity of races.

— François Hollande

During the 2012 presidential campaign, those who opposed the removal of the term race from the French Constitution offered vehement criticism of the proposal. On 26 March 2012, Nicolas Sarkozy stated in Ormes that modifying the text would be "blasphemous, a denial of our country's identity and history, and an insult to those who drafted it." He underscored his dedication to upholding the Constitution's historical anti-racist intent. Similarly, Marine Le Pen opposed the change, arguing for the retention of tools to combat what she termed anti-white racism. Political analysts, such as Camille Bouzereau, interpreted these stances as attempts to ridicule François Hollande's proposal. Sarkozy, for instance, made a sarcastic remark on 30 March 2012, suggesting that eliminating the word "unemployed" would solve the unemployment problem.

Following François Hollande's election, the constitutional amendment that had been promised was notably absent from the revision draft that was presented in March 2013. Nevertheless, the Socialist Party endorsed a legislative proposal introduced by Alfred Marie-Jeanne, a deputy from Martinique, and supported by the Left Front. The objective of this legislative proposal was to modify existing French legislation, specifically the Penal Code, the French code of criminal procedure, and the Press Freedom Act, without amending the Constitution. The proposed amendments asserted that the French Republic is committed to combating racism, anti-Semitism, and xenophobia and does not recognize the existence of any so-called race. Additionally, the proposed legislation aimed to replace the term race with expressions such as "based on racist criteria" or "motivated by racism" throughout French legislation. At the time, Christiane Taubira, Minister of Justice, commended the initiative as "a necessary, noble, and powerful act during a period marked by the resurgence and uninhibited expression of rejection toward others." Despite being adopted by the National Assembly on 16 May 2013, the bill was never debated by the Senate. In 2015, the Left Front attempted to revive the issue in the Senate following a controversial statement by European Parliament member Nadine Morano (Les Républicains), who referred to a "white race." However, their efforts were unsuccessful.

During Emmanuel Macron's presidency, the National Assembly's commission voted unanimously on 27 June 2018 (with 119 members present) to remove the word race from Article 1 of the Constitution. The vote was part of a broader review of the constitutional bill "for a more representative, responsible, and effective democracy." The word was retained in the preamble of the 1946 Constitution. Furthermore, the amendment proposed the inclusion of a prohibition against "distinction based on sex." The revised Article 1 was to read as follows: "France is an indivisible, secular, democratic, and social republic. The aforementioned article ensures equality before the law for all citizens, without distinction of sex, origin, or religion. The amendment was adopted in a plenary session on July 12, 2018, by unanimous vote, except for opposition from those representing the far-right. However, the constitutional reform process was interrupted by the Benalla affair and ultimately abandoned. In the following year, the proposed modification was omitted from a new version of the constitutional reform bill, which was now titled "for a renewal of democratic life." Delphine Batho, an independent MP at the time, attempted to reintroduce the amendment to Article 1. However, the government insisted that the discussions remain focused on the recommendations of the Citizens Convention for Climate, which led to the rejection of the amendment by the Law Commission. This second attempt at constitutional reform was also abandoned.

In June 2020, amidst a surge in anti-racist activism following the murder of George Floyd, Minister of City and Housing Julien Denormandie (LREM) endeavored to reopen the discourse surrounding the removal of the term race from the French Constitution. Subsequently, in March 2021, the Socialist group proposed a series of five amendments to a proposed modification of Article 1 of the Constitution, in conjunction with the legislation aimed at combating climate change and enhancing resilience to its effects. These amendments were rejected, and the constitutional reform project was once again abandoned. In July 2021, a constitutional bill was presented by François Jolivet (LREM), who had been absent during the vote in 2018. The only argument provided in the bill's explanatory notes was that "the persistence of [the mention of the word race] is now misunderstood, contrary to its original intent." However, this proposal ultimately went without further action.

=== Alternatives ===
The day we remove the word racism, will we have removed the idea? I mean, it's absurd!

— Nicolas Sarkozy, March 2012

Even if the intention is commendable, abolishing 'race' in social sciences or the Constitution will not make the discrimination based on it disappear.

— Pap Ndiaye, 2019

Scholars of the field, Simone Bonnafous and Pierre Fiala, have observed that the legal prohibition of a word has never resulted in the desired positive social behavioral change. The proposal to simply remove the word race from the Constitution, which is advocated by the Galilée Association and supported by certain legislators, is often viewed as symbolically dangerous, absurd, naive, or futile. Liberal-conservative philosopher Chantal Delsol characterizes this approach as a form of "magical thinking" or ideological belief, likening it to an attempt to reinvent reality by erasing words. This perspective echoes the world depicted in George Orwell's 1984. Despite the assertion by parliamentarians who voted for its removal in 2013 that this measure would not eliminate racism, many argue that it would not achieve this goal.

Gwénaèle Calvès posits that replacing the term race with "racist" or "for racist reasons", a change approved only by the National Assembly in 2013, would have prompted inquiries into the motives of the perpetrator of discrimination. However, such motives are not pertinent when defining a criminal offense. In the absence of a criminal context, the proposed change would have had the effect of absolving several forms of discrimination, including indirect and unintentional discrimination. The replacement of race with an expression using the adjective "racist" was also discussed by lawyer Emmanuel Derieux, who posited that this would render judicial work more subjective, as it would be challenging to ascertain the racist intent of an individual engaging in discriminatory behavior. Furthermore, the use of the plural form in the expression "for racist reasons" gives rise to questions: does it imply that there must be at least two reasons?

In 1992, constitutionalist Olivier Duhamel presented four alternative solutions for replacing the term "race." "Denunciation" (replacing race with pretended race); "substitution" (replacing race with ethnicity); "abstraction" (replacing race with a prohibition such as any category that discriminates between human beings); and "rectification" (replacing race with, say, genetic traits). He believes that "denunciation" is an ineffective strategy, noting that in the modern media landscape, attempts at denial are largely futile. The term "pretended race" may not be an effective solution, as it may still be perceived as a reference to race by the general public. From a political standpoint, the use of "ethnicity" is merely a euphemism, which Étienne Balibar asserts contributes to racist discourse. The use of an abstract circumlocution fails to achieve its intended educational objective. However, "rectification" would provide "protection against sociobiologists and racialists of all kinds." He proposes a formula that he deems both politically and legally useful, assuming the effect of redundancy: "without distinction based on origin, religion, real or pretended genetic traits, real or supposed ethnic affiliation, or any category aimed at discriminating between human beings."

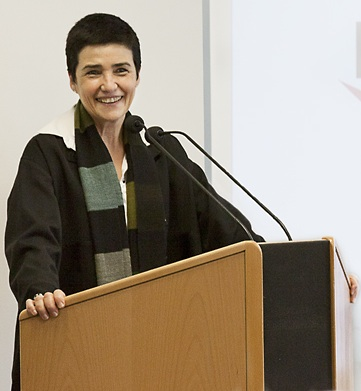
Academic Simone Bonnafous (pictured in February 2012) helped organize the 1992 symposium on the removal of the word "race" from the French Constitution.

Simone Bonnafous and Pierre Fiala critique the potential dangers of judicially regulating language and propose replacing the ternary list (sex/race/religion) with an open list, as seen in Article 2 of the 1948 Universal Declaration of Human Rights. This list includes explicit non-exhaustive marks with the repetition of "any other", thereby mitigating the adverse effects of the term race and underscoring the universal rights of each individual.

In the Senate in 2008, Robert Badinter also proposed complementing the enumeration "without distinction of origin, race, or religion" because he believed that "there is no reason to forget other forms of discrimination and the harm they cause." He even suggested removing it entirely, so that Article 1 would simply read: "France is an indivisible, secular, democratic, and social Republic. It guarantees equality before the law for all citizens."

Clémence Lavigne proposes a solution that has not been previously considered by lawmakers, potentially due to its lack of a strong symbolic impact. She suggests including a preamble that would clarify the use of the term race, as seen in several European texts. (Note: Directive 2000/43/EC of the Council of 29 June 2000, concerning the implementation of the principle of equal treatment between persons, regardless of race or ethnic origin, Official Journal No. L 180 of 19 July 2000, pp. 0022 – 0026: "The European Union rejects all theories seeking to establish the existence of distinct human races. The use of the word 'race' in this directive does not in any way imply the acceptance of such theories.") (Note: International Convention of 21 December 1965, on the Elimination of All Forms of Racial Discrimination: "Any doctrine of superiority based on the differentiation between races is scientifically false, morally reprehensible, and socially unjust and dangerous, and nothing can justify racial discrimination, either in theory or in practice.")

While combating racism is not merely a matter of words, this debate is not futile. Sociologist Didier Fassin, cited by Lavigne, offers a compelling perspective on this matter.

The difficulty of expressing ourselves places us under the obligation to think; in other words, our awkwardness in addressing these 'racial' questions and categories is not a handicap to overcome, but a truth we must confront.

— Didier Fassin

== Equivalent texts abroad ==
=== National ===
In the aftermath of the First World War, the term race was still not widely employed in Europe. The term "without distinction of race" is found in the Austrian Constitution of 1920, the Czechoslovak Constitution of 1920, and the Soviet Constitution of 1936. In the aftermath of World War II, the 1946 Yugoslav Constitution, as outlined in Article 21, asserts the equality of all citizens "without distinction of race." The preamble to the French Constitution of 1946 subsequently adopted this formula, applying it to all human beings. The expression then appeared in the peace treaties of 10 February 1947, the 1947 Italian Constitution, the 1949 German Basic Law, and in all constitutions adopted after 1945 by former communist states in Europe, America, Asia, and Africa.

The 1961 South African Constitution represents a notable exception, marking a significant break with the Commonwealth. Notably, it does not include a declaration of rights, with the principles of apartheid being governed by other laws. In stark contrast to the preceding South African constitutional texts, those adopted after the end of apartheid prohibit discrimination on the grounds of race. This is enshrined in the 1996 Constitution. (Note: 1996 South African Constitution: "The State may not unjustly discriminate, directly or indirectly, against anyone on one or more grounds, including race, sex, pregnancy, marital status, ethnic or social origin, color, sexual orientation, age, disability, religion, conscience, belief, culture, language, and birth.") The Constitution permits positive discrimination based on "race" (affirmative action), in contrast to "unfair discrimination", and denounces racial hatred. The South African Constitutional Court has stated that the Constitution's long-term goal is to create a "non-racial" society where the significance of "race" would disappear. However, the text is not racially neutral because one cannot ignore "the country's glaring history in which race, combined with class and gender, was the determining factor in the distribution of resources in our society for more than 300 years." Constitutional scholar Pierre de Vos takes issue with the colorblind viewpoint, which he believes "denies the reality of race." He asserts that the South African Constitution "differs from those that start with the principle that everyone is equal and, in doing so, merely ratify existing inequalities."

The Constitution of Australia is the only one that still permits its national parliament to discriminate against individuals based on their "race." The Constitution of Australia came into effect in 1901 with several articles mentioning the "aboriginal race." (Note: In the original version of the Australian Constitution, Article 25 stated that the states could exclude individuals from voting in elections based on their race. Article 127 stated that "in the calculation of the population of the Commonwealth [...] indigenous people shall not be counted." Article 51(26) allowed the federal Parliament to enact laws concerning "persons of any race, other than the Aboriginal race, for whom it is deemed necessary to make special laws." Article 25 was not amended. In 1967, Australians voted overwhelmingly to repeal Article 127, and to remove the italicized words from Article 51, extending the federal government's power over race as defined in Article 51(26) to Indigenous peoples.) The first Prime Minister, Edmund Barton, asserted that the Commonwealth should have the authority to "regulate the affairs of people of color or inferior race." The Constitution has been amended on several occasions, the most recent being in 1967, to recognize the rights of Aboriginal people. However, it still includes Article 25, which stipulates that states may exclude people from voting based on their "race", and Article 51 (the Race power), which grants the Commonwealth the authority to pass special laws for people "of any race." In the context of the controversy surrounding the construction of the Hindmarsh Island Bridge in 1998, the High Court of Australia made a ruling that highlighted the constitutional authority of the national parliament to enact legislation that could be perceived as discriminatory. In the 2017 Uluru Statement, Indigenous peoples called for establishing a body, designated as "the Voice", which would be empowered to issue opinions on laws and public policies affecting Aboriginal and Torres Strait Islander peoples. The decision was submitted to a referendum in 2023, which ultimately resulted in a rejection. During the campaign, those in opposition asserted that "the constitutional amendment is based on race, so it is racist", whereas proponents contended that the Australian Constitution has been inherently racist since its inception and that the amendment would recognize Indigenous peoples without validating the existence of biological races.

Austria spearheaded the initial efforts to remove the term race from its legislative framework. In 2004, it replaced it with the term "ethnic affiliation" (ethnische Zugehörigkeit) in the Federal Equal Treatment Act (Gleichbehandlungsgesetz) and the Federal Equal Treatment Act applicable to the public service sector (Bundesgleichbehandlungsgesetz). However, it did not extend this change to its penal code. The Finnish penal code employs the terms race and racial, but in 2000, the term origin (alkuperän) was established as the preferred term in the Constitution. (Note: Article 6 of the Finnish Constitution of 2000: "All persons are equal before the law. No one shall be discriminated against without a valid reason on the grounds of sex, age, origin, language, religion, beliefs, opinions, health status, disability, or any other personal characteristic. […]") In Sweden, the term race was removed from the text of the Non-Discrimination Act (Diskrimineringslagen) in 2008, and the term "ethnicity" was introduced in its place.

In Germany, the use of the word race in the Constitution (Grundgesetz) (Note: Article 3 of the Basic Law of the Federal Republic of Germany stipulates that no one may be "disadvantaged or favored because of their sex, descent, race, language, homeland and origin, faith, or religious or political opinions.") was questioned in 2008 by the German Institute for Human Rights, which argued that the text should not contain a term "used since the late 17th century to categorize and hierarchize groups of people." This argument was reiterated in 2015 by the Black People's Initiative. The debate was rekindled in Germany following the murder of George Floyd, and a revision procedure was initiated in 2021 to replace the term race with a reference to racism. However, the process was postponed due to a lack of consensus. The arguments presented in this debate are largely analogous to those presented in France.

In contrast, the term race does not engender debate in English-speaking countries. It is employed in the Fifteenth Amendment of the U.S. Constitution, (Note: Article 1 of the 15th Amendment to the United States Constitution: "The right of citizens of the United States to vote shall not be denied or abridged by the United States or any State on account of race, color, or previous condition of servitude.") adopted in 1870, (Note: In contrast, particularly with the continuation of the Black slavery system and discrimination against Native Americans. Even the 1776 Declaration of Independence stated that "all men are created equal.") and has become a routine term in administrative, legal, and common usage. In the United Kingdom, the Race Relations Act has been in force since 1965, condemning racial discrimination. However, in contrast to critical race theory, which employs the concept of race in a liberating manner, there is an "eliminativist" trend in North American philosophical literature, primarily represented by Anthony Appiah, who posits that combating racism can be achieved by ceasing to use the term race.

=== International ===
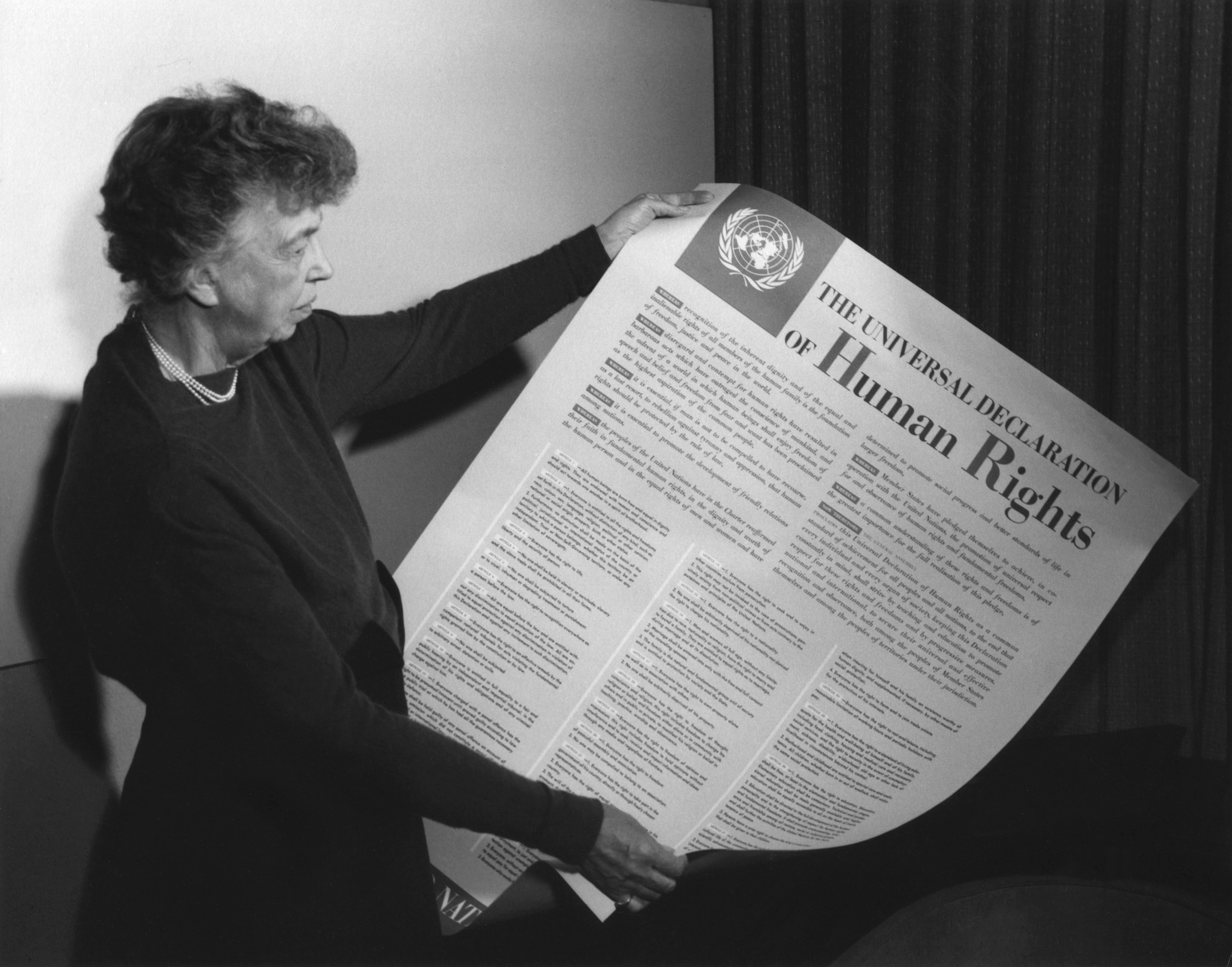
Eleanor Roosevelt holding the English version of the Universal Declaration of Human Rights in November 1949.

The condemnation of all racial discrimination is a fundamental tenet of all major international treaties, with the Universal Declaration of Human Rights in 1948, serving as the foundational document in this regard.

The International Convention on the Elimination of All Forms of Racial Discrimination, opened for signature by the United Nations on 21 December 1965, defines racial discrimination as "any distinction, exclusion, restriction, or preference based on race." France signed the Convention on 18 April 1971, at a time when neither the government nor the parliamentary majority anticipated that it would result in legislative changes. However, this did occur with the 1972 anti-racism law.

The term race is also employed in European texts, most notably in Article 10 of the Treaty on the Functioning of the European Union, signed by France on 25 March 1957. This article states that "in the definition and implementation of its policies and actions, the Union seeks to combat any discrimination based on […] race or ethnic origin." Similarly, the Charter of Fundamental Rights of the European Union, adopted on 7 December 2000, prohibits discrimination based on race, color, or ethnic origin in Article 21. The Directive of 29 June 2000, further clarifies the principle of equal treatment among individuals "without distinction of race or ethnic origin", prefacing the text with a warning about the meaning of "race." (Note: Directive 2000/43/EC of the Council of 29 June 2000, concerning the implementation of the principle of equal treatment between persons, regardless of race or ethnic origin, Official Journal No. L 180 of 19 July 2000, pp. 0022 – 0026: "The European Union rejects all theories seeking to establish the existence of distinct human races. The use of the word 'race' in this directive does not in any way imply the acceptance of such theories.")

== Bibliography ==
- Bonnafous, Simone; Herszberg, Bernard; Israel, Jean-Jacques (1992). "Sans distinction de... race" [Regardless of... race]. Mots. Les Langages du Politique (in French). 33 (1). Archived from the original on 16 March 2024.
- Lavigne, Clémence (2016). "La suppression du mot " race " des textes juridiques français" [The removal of the word “race” from French legal texts]. Revue du droit public (in French) (3): 917–933. Archived from the original on 5 July 2023.
- Zevounou, Lionel (2021a). "Raisonner à partir d'un concept de " race " en droit français" [Using the concept of “race” in French law]. Revue des droits de l'homme. Revue du Centre de recherches et d'études sur les droits fondamentaux (in French) (19). doi:10.4000/revdh.11516. ISSN 2264-119X. Archived from the original on 24 December 2023.
- Bessone, Magali (2021). "Analyser la suppression du mot " race " de la Constitution française avec la Critical race theory : un exercice de traduction ?" [Analyzing the removal of the word “race” from the French Constitution with Critical race theory: an exercise in translation?]. Droit et Société (in French). 108 (2): 367–382. doi:10.3917/drs1.108.0367. ISSN 0769-3362. Archived from the original on 4 July 2023.
- Calvès, Gwénaële (2022). "Le mot " race " dans la législation antiraciste française" [The word “race” in French anti-racist legislation]. Pouvoirs (in French). 181 (2): 73–84. doi:10.3917/pouv.181.0073. ISSN 0152-0768. Archived from the original on 30 May 2024.
- Mahon, Pascal; Graf, Anne-Laurence; Steffanini, Federica (2019). "La notion de " race " dans le droit suisse: étude juridique établie à la demande du Service de lutte contre le racisme du Département fédéral de l'intérieur" [The concept of “race” in Swiss law: a legal study commissioned by the Federal Department of Home Affairs' Service for Combating Racism.]. edi.admin.ch (in French). Archived from the original on 4 July 2023.
- Joyeux, Arthur (2022). "Suppression du mot " race " de la constitution et principe de non-discrimination : Une analyse du discours contrastive France / Union européenne" [Removal of the word “race” from the constitution and the principle of non-discrimination: A contrastive discourse analysis France / European Union]. Corela (in French) (HS-36). doi:10.4000/corela.14514. ISSN 1638-573X. Archived from the original on 4 June 2024.
