= Dodson =

Dodson may refer to:

== Places ==
=== United States ===
- Dodson, Louisiana
- Dodson, Montana
- Dodson, Ohio
- Dodson, Oregon
- Dodson, Texas
- Dodson Township, Ohio

=== Elsewhere ===
- Dodson Peninsula, Antarctica
- Dodson Valley, a town in Nelson, New Zealand

== People ==
- Akeem Dodson, American cricketer
- Antoine Dodson, American internet celebrity
- Betty Dodson (1929–2020), American sex educator
- Calaway H. Dodson, American botanist
- E. Griffith Dodson (1884-1969), Virginia lawyer, politician and conservationist
- Fitzhugh Dodson, American clinical psychologist, lecturer, educator and author
- Harry Dodson, English gardener and television personality
- Jack Dodson, American television actor
- James Dodson (mathematician) (1705–1757), British mathematician
- Jeff Dodson, American college baseball coach
- John George Dodson, 1st Baron Monk Bretton (1825–1897), British Liberal politician
- Kenneth Dodson, American novelist and writer
- Kevin Dodson, American philosopher
- Major Dodson, American actor
- Mick Dodson, Indigenous Australian leader
- Owen Dodson, African-American poet, novelist, and playwright
- Pat Dodson (baseball), former first baseman with the Boston Red Sox
- Pat Dodson, Indigenous Australian leader, brother of Mick Dodson
- Peter Dodson, American paleontologist
- Rachel Dodson, American comic book inker and colorist
- Sarah Paxton Ball Dodson (1847–1906), American painter
- Stephen Dodson Ramseur (1837-1864), American Civil War general
- Tabitha Dodson, American physicist, DARPA
- Terry Dodson, American comic book artist
- Tyrel Dodson (born 1998), American football player

== See also ==
- Dotson, a surname
- Dodgson, a surname
- Dodgeson, a 1926 American automobile
