= Dolson (surname) =

Dolson is a surname. Notable people with the surname include:

- Clarence Dolson (1897–1978), Canadian ice hockey player
- Jeanette Dolson (1918–2004), Canadian athlete
- Stefanie Dolson (born 1992), American basketball player

== See also ==
- Dotson
