= Dopson =

Dopson is a surname. Notable people with the surname include:

- John Dopson (born 1963), American baseball pitcher
- Patrick Dopson (born 1978), American gospel musician
- Rob Dopson (born 1967), Canadian ice hockey goaltender

== See also ==
- Dotson
