= Section 25 =

Section 25 may refer to:

- Section 25 (band), an English post-punk and electronic band
- Section 25 of the Canadian Charter of Rights and Freedoms
- Section 25 of the Constitution of Australia
- Section 25 of the Indian Penal Code, definition of "fraudulently"
