= Constitutional recognition of Indigenous Australians =

Constitutional recognition of Indigenous Australians refers to various proposals for changes to the Australian Constitution to recognise Indigenous Australians in the document. Various proposals have been suggested to symbolically recognise the special place Indigenous Australians have as the first peoples of Australia, along with substantial changes, such as prohibitions on racial discrimination, the protection of languages and the addition of new institutions. In 2017, the Uluru Statement from the Heart was released by Indigenous leaders, which called for the establishment of an Indigenous Voice to Parliament as their preferred form of recognition. When submitted to a national referendum in 2023 by the Albanese government, the proposal was heavily defeated.

== 1958: FCAATSI ==
From its formation in Adelaide in February 1958, the Federal Council for Aboriginal Advancement, the first united national Aboriginal advocacy group, began a campaign to change the Constitution. Their efforts culminated the yes vote in the 1967 Australian referendum (Aboriginals), which changed the Constitution to include Aboriginal and Torres Strait Islander people in population counts, and allowed Federal Parliament to legislate specifically for this group.

== 1995: ATSIC report ==
In February 1995, the Recognition, Rights and Reform report by the Aboriginal and Torres Strait Islander Commission (ATSIC) stated that constitutional reform was a priority, finding massive support for recognising Indigenous Australians in the Constitution.

On 16 October 2007, Prime Minister John Howard promised to hold a referendum on constitutional recognition, and Labor leader Kevin Rudd gave bipartisan support. On 8 November 2010 Prime Minister Julia Gillard announced plans for a referendum on the issue.

== 2012: Expert panel ==
In 2010, the federal government established an Expert Panel to inquire into changing the federal Constitution so that Australia's Indigenous peoples would be recognised in it. The panel's co-chairmen were Patrick Dodson and Mark Leibler. The report titled Recognising Aboriginal and Torres Strait Islander Peoples in the Constitution was presented to prime minister Julia Gillard on 19 January 2012. The report recommended the removal of Constitution sections 25 and 51(xxvi), and the insertion of new sections 51A. 116A and 127A:

Section 51A Recognition of Aboriginal and Torres Strait Islander peoples

Recognising that the continent and its islands now known as Australia were first occupied by Aboriginal and Torres Strait Islander peoples;
Acknowledging the continuing relationship of Aboriginal and Torres Strait Islander peoples with their traditional lands and waters;
Respecting the continuing cultures, languages and heritage of Aboriginal and Torres Strait Islander peoples;
Acknowledging the need to secure the advancement of Aboriginal and Torres Strait Islander peoples;
the Parliament shall, subject to this Constitution, have power to make laws for the peace, order and good government of the Commonwealth with respect to Aboriginal and Torres Strait Islander peoples.

Section 116A Prohibition of racial discrimination

(1) The Commonwealth, a State or a Territory shall not discriminate on the grounds of race, colour or ethnic or national origin.
(2) Subsection (1) does not preclude the making of laws or measures for the purpose of overcoming disadvantage, ameliorating the effects of past discrimination, or protecting the cultures, languages or heritage of any group.

Section 127A Recognition of languages

(1) The national language of the Commonwealth of Australia is English.
(2) The Aboriginal and Torres Strait Islander languages are the original Australian languages, a part of our national heritage.

The panel recommended that there be a single referendum, in which removal of s 51(xxvi) and insertion of the new s 51A would be proposed together, so that the validity of legislation that depends upon s 51(xxvi), such as the Native Title Act 1993 (Cth), would switch immediately from s 51(xxvi) to s 51A. The panel sought a referendum process that will be nationally unifying and not divisive, with an eventual level of public support similar to that in 1967. To that end, it proposed that the referendum be preceded by "a properly resourced public education and awareness program" and "should only proceed when it is likely to be supported by all major political parties, and a majority of State governments". If the federal government were to prefer different changes, the panel advised, it should return to consultation with the Aboriginal and Torres Strait Islander peoples.

== Recognition Act 2013 ==
On 12 March 2013, with all-party support, the federal parliament passed the Aboriginal and Torres Strait Islander Peoples Recognition Act 2013, which recognised the Indigenous peoples of Australia and required the establishment of a committee to advise on a suitable date for a referendum on these proposals. The process was to have been completed within two years, with a sunset provision ending the force of the Act on 28 March 2015, but provision was made to make it self-repealing on 28 March 2018.

== 2015: Joint Select Committee ==
A Joint Select Committee on Constitutional Recognition of Aboriginal and Torres Strait Islander Peoples was established in 2013 to consider the recommendations of the Expert Panel report and delivered its report in June 2015.

== 2015: Referendum Council ==
On 7 December 2015, a Referendum Council, with 16 Indigenous and non-Indigenous members, was established to advise the Prime Minister Malcolm Turnbull and Leader of the Opposition Bill Shorten on progress toward a referendum. It built on extensive work by the Expert Panel and the Joint Select Committee. It conducted national consultations which continued through the second half of 2016, and published a discussion paper about five key proposals in October 2016. The Recognition Council used a deliberative process which included six months of regional dialogues which resulted in a collective report of what constitutional recognition meant to aboriginal people.

The Uluru Statement from the Heart was the culmination of a national Indigenous public consultation process in May 2017 at the First Nations National Constitutional Convention held at Uluru. It proposed constitutional reform on three points: voice, truth, and treaty. It was a deeply considered statement recommending deliberate structural reform, setting out three steps to achieve this, in a way that recognises First Nations sovereignty and overcomes their current powerlessness. The main proposals of the Uluru Statement were:

- a national representative body with the power to advise parliament on laws that affect Indigenous peoples (Voice); and
- a "Makarrata Commission" to supervise a process of agreement-making (Treaty) between governments and First Nations and undertake a public truth-telling process (Truth) about Australia's history.

The final report released on 30 June 2017 by the Referendum Council was largely supportive of the Uluru Statement. The majority of the council recommended that a referendum be held to change the Constitution to establish an "Indigenous voice to parliament". The first recommendation of the Final Report of the Referendum Council recommended:

That a referendum be held to provide in the Australian Constitution for a representative body that gives Aboriginal and Torres Strait Islander First Nations a Voice to the Commonwealth Parliament. One of the specific functions of such a body, to be set out in legislation outside the Constitution, should include the function of monitoring the use of the heads of power in section 51 (xxvi) and section 122. The body will recognise the status of Aboriginal and Torres Strait Islander peoples as the first peoples of Australia.

The council commented but did not recommend the establishment of a Makarrata Commission, which was outside its terms of reference.

There was little debate in the media after the release of the Referendum Council's report. On 26 October 2017, the Turnbull government released a media statement that largely rejected the major proposals. It said that an Indigenous national representative body would "inevitably become seen as a third chamber of Parliament" and would not be supported by the majority of Australians. The next step would be a Joint Select Committee to consider the recommendations of the existing bodies of work developed over the previous decade to develop a different set of constitutional amendments which would be acceptable to all.

== 2018: Joint Select Committee ==
The Joint Select Committee on Constitutional Recognition relating to Aboriginal and Torres Strait Islander Peoples was appointed in March 2018, co-chaired by Senator Patrick Dodson and Julian Leeser MP and comprising six Lower House and four Upper House representatives. It presented its final report on 29 November 2018. There first two recommendations in the report have a possible bearing on constitutional change:

1. In order to achieve a design for The Voice that best suits the needs and aspirations of Aboriginal and Torres Strait Islander peoples, the Committee recommends that the Australian Government initiate a process of co-design with Aboriginal and Torres Strait Islander peoples.
2. The Committee recommends that, following a process of co-design, the Australian Government consider, in a deliberate and timely manner, legislative, executive and constitutional options to establish The Voice.

== 2019: Indigenous voice to government ==
An Indigenous voice to government via a "co-design process" was set in train by the establishment of the Senior Advisory Group (SAG), announced by Minister for Indigenous Australians Ken Wyatt in October 2019. The Morrison government has said it would run a referendum during its present term about recognising Indigenous people in the Constitution "should a consensus be reached and should it be likely to succeed”. The National Indigenous Australians Agency (NIAA) website states: "The Australian Government is committed to recognising Aboriginal and Torres Strait Islander Australians in the Constitution". In his Closing the Gap speech in February 2020, Prime Minister Morrison reinforced the work of the Referendum Council, rejecting the idea of merely symbolic recognition, supporting a Voice co-designed by Aboriginal and Torres Strait Islander people, "using the language of listening and empowerment". The Labor Party has supported a Voice enshrined in the Constitution for a long time.

== 2022: First meetings of referendum working groups ==
Following an announcement by the Albanese Government in mid-2022 to conduct a referendum on the Indigenous Voice to Parliament, the first meetings of the First Nations Referendum Working Group, aka Referendum Working Group, and the Referendum Engagement Group began to consider the timing to conduct a successful referendum; refining the proposed constitutional amendment and question; and lastly, the information on the Voice necessary for a successful referendum.

On 30 March 2023, the Constitution Alteration (Aboriginal and Torres Strait Islander Voice) bill was introduced to the Australian House of Representatives by Attorney General Mark Dreyfus. The proposed new Section 129 reads:

Chapter IX – Recognition of Aboriginal and Torres Strait Islander Peoples

129 Aboriginal and Torres Strait Islander Voice

In recognition of Aboriginal and Torres Strait Islander peoples as the First Peoples of Australia:

(1) There shall be a body to be called the Aboriginal and Torres Strait Islander Voice;

(2) The Aboriginal and Torres Strait Islander Voice may make representations to the Parliament and the Executive Government of the Commonwealth on matters relating to Aboriginal and Torres Strait Islander peoples;

(3) The Parliament shall, subject to this Constitution, have power to make laws with respect to matters relating to the Aboriginal and Torres Strait Islander Voice, including its composition, functions, powers and procedures.

The wording of the amendment was finalised with the bill passing both houses of the Australian Parliament on 19 June 2023. The referendum to establish an Indigenous Voice to Parliament was voted down on 14 October 2023.

== Challenges ==
The question of how exactly to bring about constitutional change remains a topic of debate among Indigenous leaders. According to Marcia Langton (now co-chair of the Senior Advisory Group), "for such a national agreement to be achieved, there must be some mutually pressing reason related to security or economic issues for both parties to abide by the terms".

The Australian Human Rights Commission supports recognition of Aboriginal and Torres Strait Islander peoples in a preamble to the Constitution.

The call for a treaty is related to constitutional recognition of prior ownership of the land, as it reinforces the symbolic recognition of sovereignty of the original owners: a treaty is "a contract between two sovereign parties". As of 2020, a number of Indigenous treaties in Australia are under way at state level.

On 26 March 2023, the South Australian Parliament created a First Nations Voice at state level.

== Polls ==
Polls on Constitutional recognition
| Dates | Media organisation | Sample | Yes | No | DK | Ref. |
|---|---|---|---|---|---|---|
| November 2023 | Resolve | | 48% | 34% | 19% | |
| October 2023 | Resolve | | 58% | 27% | 15% | |
| July 2021 | Essential | 1,099 | 57% | 16% | 27% | |
| June 2019 | Essential | 1,097 | 57% | 18% | 25% | |
| September 2016 | Essential | 1,005 | 58% | 15% | 28% | |
| 2016 | Australian Broadcasting Corporation | | 72% | 14% | 14% | |
| July 2015 | Essential | 1,006 | 61% | 16% | 23% | |
| August 2014 | Essential | 1,008 | 58% | 10% | 32% | |
| 2013 | Australian Broadcasting Corporation | 422,403 | 70% | 13% | 17% | |

== State Constitutional recognition ==
Since 2016 all Australian States have Constitutional recognition of Aboriginal Australians in their State constitutions.

The first State in Australia to give constitutional recognition to Aboriginal people was Victoria, which introduced it in 2004, Queensland (2010) without bipartisan support, New South Wales (2010) with labor/liberal bipartisan support, South Australia (2013) with labor/liberal bipartisan support, Western Australia (2015) with liberal/labor bipartisan support and Tasmania in 2016 with liberal/labor bipartisan support.

== Notable advocates ==
Noel Pearson has long advocated for constitutional recognition for Aboriginal and Torres Strait Islander peoples in the constitution. In March 2021, Pearson spoke on the topic of constitutional recognition at the National Museum of Australia. In his address, he sums up the background and history of the proposal and urges a referendum on the matter, saying "Constitutional recognition of Indigenous Australians is not a project of "woke" identity politics. It is Australia's longest-standing and unresolved project for justice and inclusion".

== See also ==
- Constitution (Recognition of Aboriginal Peoples) Amendment Act 2013, an Act to incorporate recognition of Aboriginal peoples in the South Australian Constitution
- Reconciliation in Australia
- Australian Indigenous sovereignty
