= Dootson =

Dootson is a surname. Notable people with the surname include:

- Craig Dootson (born 1979), English footballer
- Eddie Dootson (born 1961), English darts player
- Jack Dootson (1914–1985), American politician
