= Uluru Statement from the Heart =

2017 Australian Indigenous reform petition

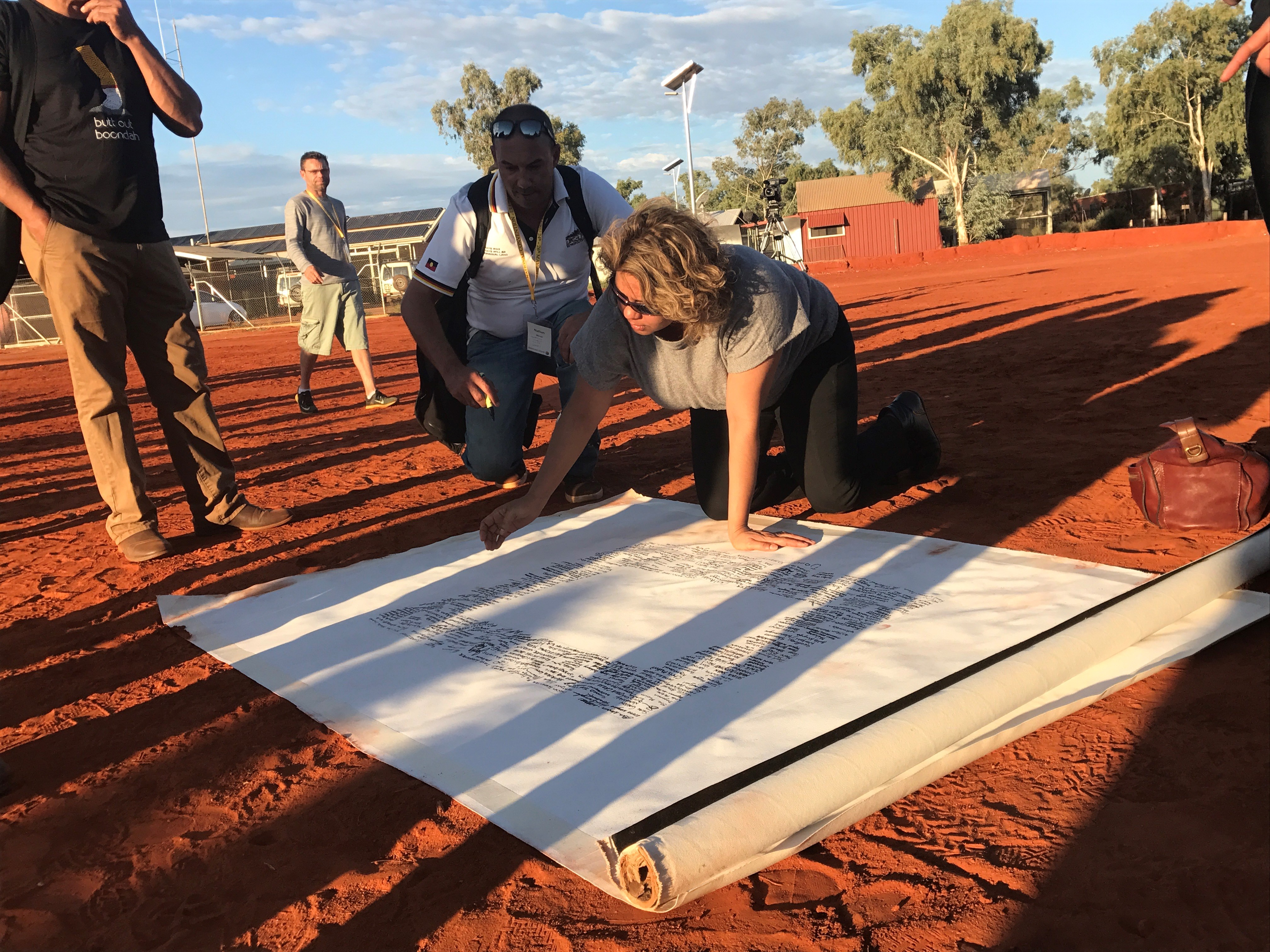
Signing of the Uluru Statement

The Uluru Statement from the Heart is a 2017 petition to the people of Australia, written and endorsed by the Australian Aboriginal and Torres Strait Islander leaders selected as delegates to the First Nations National Constitutional Convention. The document calls for substantive constitutional change and structural reform through the creation of two new institutions; a constitutionally protected First Nations Voice and a Makarrata Commission, (Note: "Makarrata" is a Yolngu word "describing a process of conflict resolution, peacemaking and justice", or "a coming together after a struggle".) to oversee agreement-making and truth-telling between governments and First Nations. Such reforms should be implemented, it is argued, both in recognition of the continuing sovereignty of Indigenous peoples and to address structural power differences that have led to severe disparities between Indigenous and non-Indigenous Australians. These reforms are summarised as Voice, Treaty and Truth.

In October 2017, the then Coalition government rejected the Voice proposal, characterising it as a "radical" constitutional change that would not be supported by a majority of Australians in a referendum. Following this, in May 2022 Labor leader Anthony Albanese endorsed the Uluru Statement on the occasion of his 2022 election victory and committed to implementing it in full. However, the Voice was rejected at a subsequent referendum in 2023. The government later backed away from the Treaty and Truth elements of the Uluru Statement, with Albanese stating in 2025 that his government would go in "another direction" and instead focus on "economic empowerment".

== Background ==
=== 2015: Referendum Council ===
The 16-member Referendum Council was jointly appointed by the prime minister, Malcolm Turnbull, and Leader of the Opposition, Bill Shorten, on 7 December 2015. The Council was to advise the government on steps towards a referendum to recognise Aboriginal and Torres Strait Islander peoples in the Australian Constitution. It built on extensive work by the Expert Panel on Constitutional Recognition of Indigenous Australians and the Joint Select Committee on Constitutional Recognition of Aboriginal and Torres Strait Islander Peoples. The Council was made up of Indigenous and non-Indigenous community leaders and included:

- Patrick Dodson (Co-chair, until resigning on 2 March 2016 after becoming a Labor Party Senator)
- Pat Anderson (Co-chair on resignation of Pat Dodson)
- Mark Leibler (Co-chair)
- Megan Davis
- Andrew Demetriou
- Natasha Stott Despoja
- Murray Gleeson
- Mick Gooda (until 27 February 2017)
- Stan Grant (until 4 March 2017)
- Emeritus Professor Colleen Hayward
- Tanya Hosch
- Kristina Keneally
- Jane McAloon
- Noel Pearson
- Michael Rose
- Amanda Vanstone
- Dalassa Yorkston
- Galarrwuy Yunupingu (until his death on 3 April 2023)
- Denise Bowden (As proxy for Yunupingu)

In October 2016, the Council released the "Discussion Paper on Constitutional Recognition of Aboriginal and Torres Strait Islander Peoples" to guide discussion. In the group's "Final Report", it was noted that matters outside the discussion papers' key themes were out of scope for the final recommendations. These themes were:

- Statement of acknowledgement
- A federal power to make laws for Aboriginal and Torres Strait Islander peoples
- A constitutional prohibition against racial discrimination
- An Indigenous voice
- Deleting section 25

Between December 2016 and May 2017, the Referendum Council held 13 meetings across Australia and met with over 1,200 Aboriginal and Torres Strait Islander representatives. These meetings, known as the 'Regional Dialogues', consulted Aboriginal and Torres Strait Islander peoples on their views on constitutional recognition. The Regional Dialogues process is the most proportionally significant consultation process of First Nations peoples in Australia's history.

The Regional Dialogues, and the First Nations National Constitutional Convention that followed, resulted in a consensus document on constitutional recognition, the Uluru Statement from the Heart.

=== 2017: First Nations National Constitutional Convention ===
The First Nations National Constitutional Convention met over four days from 23 to 26 May 2017. Each of the 13 regional dialogues selected delegates to attend the National Convention along with the convenors and working group leaders, mostly through secret ballot, with a total of 17 delegates for each dialogue. The remaining members of the Convention were appointed by the Referendum Council. The convention concluded with member Megan Davis giving the first public reading of the statement after it was adopted by the delegates. A freedom of information request in 2023 released the meeting records of the First Nations Regional Dialogues and a draft version of the Final Report of the Referendum Council. The draft version included a longer version of the Uluru Statement, which was ultimately included in the Final Report of the Referendum Council as 'extracts from the Uluru Statement from the Heart'.

== Uluru Statement from the Heart ==
=== Text ===
The text of what is generally characterised as the full statement, but also as the "one-page pitch" of the full document is as follows:

We, gathered at the 2017 National Constitutional Convention, coming from all points of the southern sky, make this statement from the heart:

Our Aboriginal and Torres Strait Islander tribes were the first sovereign Nations of the Australian continent and its adjacent islands, and possessed it under our own laws and customs. This our ancestors did, according to the reckoning of our culture, from the Creation, according to the common law from 'time immemorial', and according to science more than 60,000 years ago.

This sovereignty is a spiritual notion: the ancestral tie between the land, or 'mother nature', and the Aboriginal and Torres Strait Islander peoples who were born therefrom, remain attached thereto, and must one day return thither to be united with our ancestors. This link is the basis of the ownership of the soil, or better, of sovereignty. It has never been ceded or extinguished, and co-exists with the sovereignty of the Crown.

How could it be otherwise? That peoples possessed a land for sixty millennia and this sacred link disappears from world history in merely the last two hundred years?

With substantive constitutional change and structural reform, we believe this ancient sovereignty can shine through as a fuller expression of Australia’s nationhood.

Proportionally, we are the most incarcerated people on the planet. We are not an innately criminal people. Our children are aliened from their families at unprecedented rates. This cannot be because we have no love for them. And our youth languish in detention in obscene numbers. They should be our hope for the future.

These dimensions of our crisis tell plainly the structural nature of our problem. This is the torment of our powerlessness.

We seek constitutional reforms to empower our people and take a rightful place in our own country. When we have power over our destiny our children will flourish. They will walk in two worlds and their culture will be a gift to their country.

We call for the establishment of a First Nations Voice enshrined in the Constitution.

Makarrata is the culmination of our agenda: the coming together after a struggle. It captures our aspirations for a fair and truthful relationship with the people of Australia and a better future for our children based on justice and self-determination.

We seek a Makarrata Commission to supervise a process of agreement-making between governments and First Nations and truth-telling about our history.

In 1967 we were counted, in 2017 we seek to be heard. We leave base camp and start our trek across this vast country. We invite you to walk with us in a movement of the Australian people for a better future.

The italics, which appear in the original, denote quotations. The first is from an opinion written by Fouad Ammoun, Vice-President of the International Court of Justice, as part of the Western Sahara case of 1975. This opinion was cited in the landmark Mabo land rights case. The second is from an essay by anthropologist Bill Stanner. The third is from former Prime Minister Gough Whitlam.

==== Note on Makarrata ====
Makarrata is a Yolngu word "describing a process of conflict resolution, peacemaking and justice", or "a coming together after a struggle". It originally referred to a ritualised ceremony of "revenge", dispute resolution, and "peace-making" in which members of an aggrieved clan throw spears at a wrongdoer until blood is drawn. In some areas, the ceremony was satisfied by a transgressor being ritually speared in the leg instead of facing the spears head on. Once blood was drawn, the feud was over, with the wrong suffered to the accuser satisfied. Members said Makarrata "captures our aspirations for a fair and truthful relationship with the people of Australia", and the Makarrata Commission would "supervise a process of agreement-making between governments and First Nations". The word has also been used to mean "treaty", as adopted by the National Aboriginal Conference in the 1980s in order to use an Aboriginal word for their proposed "Treaty of Commitment ... between the Aboriginal Nation and the Australian Government".

=== Artwork ===
In keeping with the tradition of the Yirrkala bark petitions and the Barunga statement, the Uluru Statement was made in the form of a work of art. The statement is placed in the centre which is where the power resides. Surrounding the statement are signatures of over 250 delegates who attended the conference and reached consensus. There are 100 First Nations represented in the statement by signers who included the name of their nation.

The artwork surrounding the signatures was created by artists from Maruku art centre in Mutitjulu, led by Rene Kulitja, and painted by artists Christine Brumby, Charmaine Kulitja, and Happy Reid. It tells the story of two Tjukurpa creation stories of the traditional owners of Uluru, the Aṉangu people. One tells how the Uluru landscape was shaped by a fight to the death at the Mutitjulu Rockhole between Kuniya, the woma python with eggs from the north east, at the top left, and Liru, the poisonous snake from the south west, at the bottom left. The other tells the story of the Mala people, represented by the Rufous hare-wallaby who, while holding a ceremony at the top of Uluru, became involved in a dispute with men who came from the west. The men left and created Kurpany, the devil dingo, represented by the dog prints.

The artwork was reproduced as a huge immersive light installation at the Parrtjima light festival in Alice Springs in April 2023, with the festival theme inspired by the statement, "Listen with the heart".

=== Translations ===
The Uluru Statement has been translated into over 20 different Australian Aboriginal languages and 60 other languages, as well as Auslan.

In November 2020, SBS Radio announced that their journalists have translated the Statement into more than 60 languages, and there are plans for it to be translated and recorded in more than 12 Indigenous languages.

=== Length ===
In the campaign for 2023 Voice to Parliament referendum, some leaders and politicians opposing constitutional change alleged in August 2023 that the Uluru Statement is actually much longer than the one-page document commonly cited. They pointed to documents released by the National Indigenous Australians Agency (NIAA) in March 2023 under freedom of information (FOI) laws. Documents 1–13 are records of the 13 regional dialogues. Document 14 includes a page titled "Uluru Statement Statement from the Heart", followed by further sections titled "Our Story", "Guiding Principles", and "Reform Priorities", in the same font and heading level as the first page. These sections are also reproduced in the Final Report to the Referendum Council as "extracts from the Uluru Statement from the Heart".

Peta Credlin pointed to comments made by Megan Davis at the 2021–2 Sydney Peace Prize Award Ceremony and during her 2018 Henry Parkes Oration where Davis stated that "the Uluru Statement from my Heart isn't just the first one-page statement; it's actually a very lengthy Document of about 18 to 20 pages…". Disputing this, Davis has stated that the Uluru Statement is indeed one page, and her previous statements referring to other pages was merely "[an allusion] to the many pieces of Information that informed the Uluru Statement or provide context to the statement". She also points out that the official version of the Uluru Statement as hosted by the Referendum Council website since 2017 is one page. Anthony Albanese, in responding to questions about the length in Question Time from deputy opposition leader Susan Ley stated that the Uluru Statement is one page and characterised the dispute as a conspiracy theory that had long been debunked. Pat Anderson, who was a co-chair of the Referendum Council and an architect of the Uluru Statement, supports this view, describing the "Our Story" section as merely a recording of everything that was said at the Regional Dialogues. The NIAA has also stated that the Uluru Statement is one page, refuting claims made by no campaign leader Jacinta Nampijinpa Price. A spokesperson from the NIAA stated the 26 page extract contained "the one page Uluru Statement from the Heart, followed by 25 pages of background information and excerpts of regional dialogues that informed the one-page Uluru Statement" and excerpts of regional dialogues contained in the FOI release "simply reflect the broad range of comments of participants involved in the process" and "do not represent the policy of either the government at the time they were created or the current government". However, in August 2023, Davis and Anderson published a book in which they claim the Statement is 15 pages long.

== The Final Report of the Referendum Council ==
The Final Report of the Referendum Council contains the following recommendations:

1. That a referendum be held to provide in the Australian Constitution for a representative body that gives Aboriginal and Torres Strait Islander First Nations a Voice to the Commonwealth Parliament. One of the specific functions of such a body, to be set out in legislation outside the Constitution, should include the function of monitoring the use of the heads of power in section 51 (xxvi) and section 122. The body will recognise the status of Aboriginal and Torres Strait Islander peoples as the first peoples of Australia.
2. That an extra-constitutional Declaration of Recognition be enacted by legislation passed by all Australian Parliaments, ideally on the same day, to articulate a symbolic statement of recognition to unify Australians.

The Final Report also notes that there are other matters of great importance to Australia's Indigenous peoples that can be more appropriately addressed outside the Constitution, realising many difficulties involved in Constitutional amendments, and recognising the principle of parliamentary supremacy. being: a statement of recognition; the establishment of a Makarrata Commission; a process to facilitate truth telling.

Sections of the Final Report described as 'extracts from the Uluru Statement from the Heart' include a section titled 'Our Story', outlining Indigenous history and resistance, a set of 'Guiding Principles' to govern the assessment of any proposals that result from the Uluru Statement, and a further analysis of Voice, Treaty and Truth regarding the outcomes delegates wished to see from them.

Parts of the statement state that First Nations Law was violated by the coming of the British to Australia, that Australia was not settled or discovered but invaded, that the Stolen Generation was an attempt to breed Aboriginality out of people, that Makarrata (another word for treaty) is the culmination of the agenda of the signatories and is the process by which First Nations will express their sovereignty. Other parts note the views of some delegates that the Voice should be a mechanism for providing 'free, prior and informed consent' rather than advice, and that Treaty could include a proper say in decision-making, the establishment of a truth commission, reparations, a financial settlement (such as seeking a percentage of GDP), the resolution of land, water and resources issues, recognition of authority and customary law, and guarantees of respect for the rights of Aboriginal and Torres Strait Islander Peoples.

== Presentation to government and journey across country ==
The Final Report of the Referendum Council was published on 30 June 2017, and sent to the Prime Minister, Malcolm Turnbull, and the leader of the opposition, Bill Shorten. It included the Uluru Statement as a preface, and the essay Rom Watangu – The Law of the Land by Galarrwuy Yunupingu, in which he describes Rom watangu as the overarching law of the land, which is "lasting and alive... my backbone".

The 439 words of the Uluru Statement were printed onto a large canvas, surrounded by the signatures of participants, and afterwards decorated by Anangu law women. This official painted and signed canvas artwork was presented to the Prime Minister and the Leader of the Opposition on 5 August 2017, at the Garma Festival in north-east Arnhem Land in the Northern Territory. The Statement was also on display alongside musician John Butler at the Woodford Folk Festival in Queensland.

=== Initial government response ===
On 26 October 2017 Prime Minister Turnbull issued a joint statement with the Attorney-General, George Brandis, and the Indigenous Affairs Minister, Nigel Scullion, rejecting the statement. The statement said "The government does not believe such a radical change to our Constitution’s representative institutions has any realistic prospect of being supported by a majority of Australians in a majority of states".

=== After presentation ===
Thomas Mayo, a member of the Darwin dialogues and a signatory to the Uluru Statement, travelled the country for 18 months in his car with the rolled-up canvas in a tube, showing it to people and explaining what the Voice was about. Mayo said that wherever he took it and laid it out in the red dirt, people felt "the symbolism of it, the fact that this canvas was where our song-lines come together in the centre, with the poetic, powerful message, and the invitation to the Australian people", and described it as "the most sacred document in this country" and "incredibly moving". His journey is documented in his book Finding the Heart of the Nation.

== Community response ==
=== Public polling ===
Research commissioned by From the Heart and conducted by the C|T Group in June 2020 showed that a majority of Australians supported a constitutionally enshrined Voice to Parliament, and that this support had increased 7 percent in three months, from 49 percent in March to 56 percent in June 2020. There were 2000 participants in the survey, who were asked: "If a referendum were held today, how would you vote on the proposal to change the Constitution to set up a new body comprising Aboriginal and Torres Strait Islander people that gives advice to federal parliament on Aboriginal and Torres Strait Islander issues?" Only 17 percent said they would vote no, down 3 percent since March 2020.

Support for the Voice reached a high of approximately 65% around October 2022, but then steadily declined as campaigning around the proposal increased, with the decline accelerating once the Liberal and National parties declared their opposition to the proposed amendment. The referendum was defeated, with an approximate 60% no vote nationwide.

Following the defeat of the referendum on the first element of the statement, polling in November 2023 found public support for a treaty had declined to 33% (37% opposing, 31% undecided), down from 58% support in October 2023. The same poll also found public support for a truth telling commission through a Makarrata commission to be 35% (31% opposed and 34% undecided). Support for a Voice implemented by legislation recorded a 40% approval, with 40% opposed and 20% undecided. However, support for the government consulting with an independent Indigenous representative body (as alluded to in an unsigned letter released after the referendum) received higher support, with 43% supporting the idea, 34% opposed and 23% undecided.

=== Accolades and support ===
The Uluru Statement from the Heart received significant public support from individuals, institutions and civil society groups following its release in 2017. The Uluru Dialogue, a group formed from key members of the writers of the statement based in the UNSW Indigenous Law Centre to advocate for the requests of the statement, received support by many members of the public, prominent individuals, and a range of organisations from football clubs, medical and historical associations, through to banks and corporations such as Rio Tinto and Qantas.

In his 2019 induction speech to the Logies Hall of Fame, Journalist Kerry O'Brien voiced his support for the Uluru Statement from the Heart by calling on the Australian Parliament, during the current term, to "make a genuine effort to understand and support what is embodied in the Uluru Statement From the Heart". He added "the Uluru statement represents no threat to a single individual in any corner of this country, and certainly no threat to the integrity of Parliament. And if you're told that, don't you believe it. On the contrary, it will add much to the integrity of our nation."

In May 2019, 22 leaders in the Australian finance sector called for all Australians to embrace the Uluru Statement from the Heart. Investment banker and philanthropist, John Wylie wrote in the Weekend Australian: "We believe that accepting the call in the Uluru Statement for constitutional recognition will be a foundation stone of a modern Australia that’s a spiritually generous country truly at peace with itself and its history."

The Cape York Institute established the "From the Heart" education project in early 2020. The aim of the project is to increase awareness and understanding of the Uluru Statement from the Heart and a constitutionally enshrined Voice to Parliament, and to show that it is a fair and practical reform.

The Uluru Statement was awarded the 2021–2022 Sydney Peace Prize in May 2021.

=== Objections ===
In December 2017, traditional owners of Uluru, Anangu elders Alison Hunt and Donald Fraser, asked that the Reconciliation Council remove the word "Uluru" from the title, saying it was included without proper consultation. These issues have since been discussed and settled, with Central Land Council chair Sammy Wilson having given the group's blessing to use the name as part of the Uluru Statement from the Heart and its message to the Australian people.

Opposition to the key component of the Uluru Statement, the Indigenous Voice to Parliament, as well as some of the broader objectives of the Uluru Statement has been expressed by various individuals on both sides of the political divide.

NT Indigenous politician for the Country Liberal Party, Jacinta Nampijinpa Price (who was elected to the Australian Senate in May 2022), does not favour an amendment that, according to her view, "divides along the line of race". Queensland Senator James McGrath (Liberal) has suggested that the Voice would damage equality and similarly "divide Australians by race". Others, including members of the conservative think tank the Institute of Public Affairs have suggested that the idea of a Voice selected on racial grounds violates the principles of racial equality. Columnist Andrew Bolt has also criticised the objectives of the Uluru Statement.

Lidia Thorpe, (later a Victorian Senator initially as Greens member and later as an independent), was one of those walked out of the Convention and refused to sign the final document, due to the lack of a guaranteed treaty process. In October 2020, Adam Bandt, leader of the Australian Greens, signalled a shift in policy, saying that the Uluru Statement reforms list should be reordered, from "Voice, Treaty, Truth" to "Truth, Treaty, Voice".

== Follow-ups ==
=== Offshoots ===
==== Uluru Dialogue ====
The Uluru Dialogue (2017) represents the cultural authority of the Uluru Statement from the Heart and leads community education on the Uluru Statement's reforms of Voice, Treaty and Truth. The Uluru Dialogue is based at the University of New South Wales, and is chaired by Professor Megan Davis and Pat Anderson. The Uluru Dialogue continues to lead public education about the Uluru Statement despite the failure of the referendum in 2023.

The Uluru Youth Dialogue, co-chaired by Allira Davis and Bridget Cama, is a collective of Indigenous young people who support the Uluru Statement from the Heart. The Uluru Youth Dialogue sits under the authority of the Uluru Dialogue and were the only youth-led campaign in support of the 2023 Voice to Parliament referendum.

In May 2025 the group launched its truth-telling project, called "Towards Truth", beginning with an exhibition at Hurstville Library that illustrated the significance of Salt Pan Creek in Aboriginal history.

==== From the Heart ====
"From the Heart" was a campaign by the Noel Pearson founded Cape York Institute, launched in 2020. It was designed to increase awareness and understanding of the Uluru Statement and a constitutionally enshrined voice to parliament, and to show that it is a fair and practical reform. Torres Strait Islander man Thomas Mayo, (Note: Formerly known as Thomas Mayor.) advocate for the Uluru Statement and the Voice, delivered the 2022 Vincent Lingiari Memorial Lecture on the topic. He drew parallels between Vincent Lingiari's struggle to be heard by governments back then, leading to the Wave Hill walk-off (Gurdindji strike), to what Indigenous peoples of Australia are experiencing today.

=== Morrison government ===
The Joint Select Committee on Constitutional Recognition relating to Aboriginal and Torres Strait Islander Peoples was appointed in March 2018, co-chaired by Senator Patrick Dodson and Julian Leeser MP and comprising six Lower House and four Upper House representatives. It presented its final report on 29 November 2018. There were four recommendations in the report:

1. In order to achieve a design for The Voice that best suits the needs and aspirations of Aboriginal and Torres Strait Islander peoples, the Committee recommends that the Australian Government initiate a process of co-design with Aboriginal and Torres Strait Islander peoples.
2. The Committee recommends that, following a process of co-design, the Australian Government consider, in a deliberate and timely manner, legislative, executive and constitutional options to establish The Voice.
3. The Committee recommends that the Australian Government support the process of truth-telling.
4. The Committee also recommends that the Australian Government consider the establishment, in Canberra, of a National Resting Place, for Aboriginal and Torres Strait Islander remains which could be a place of commemoration, healing and reflection.

The first recommendation, that of creating an Indigenous voice to government via a "co-design process", was set in motion by the establishment of the Senior Advisory Group (SAG), announced by Minister for Indigenous Australians Ken Wyatt in October 2019. The Senior Advisory Group is co-chaired by Professor Tom Calma, Chancellor of the University of Canberra, and Professor Dr Marcia Langton, Associate Provost at the University of Melbourne, and comprises a total of 20 leaders and experts from across the country. The government also said it would run a referendum during its present term about recognising Indigenous people in the constitution "should a consensus be reached and should it be likely to succeed". By March 2020 (around the beginning of the COVID-19 pandemic in Australia), the two other groups, National and Local and Regional, had been set up and had met at least once.

=== Albanese government ===
Following the 2022 Australian federal election, incoming Prime Minister of Australia, Anthony Albanese, endorsed the Uluru Statement and committed to implementing it in full. As a result of this, a referendum to amend the constitution to include the Voice was held on 14 October 2023. However, the referendum did not pass.

On the first anniversary of the apology to the stolen generations after the referendum in 2024, the government recommitted to makarrata and truth-telling, whilst also noting that the process would take some time. The government also released the annual Closing The Gap report, which stated that agreements in each state and territory would be made to implement joint decision making with Indigenous Australians where they choose their own representatives.

Dorinda Cox of the Greens introduced a draft bill, also supported by the organisers of the referendum campaign, to establish a Truth and Justice Commission. The Standing Committee on Aboriginal and Torres Strait Islander Affairs, which is responsible for this issue, opened until 6 September its public review.

== See also ==
- Australian Indigenous Sovereignty
- Barunga Statement
- Constitutional recognition of Indigenous Australians
- Indigenous Voice to Parliament
- Indigenous treaties in Australia
- Yirrkala bark petitions
