= Pat Dodson =

Australian politician (born 1948)

Patrick Dodson
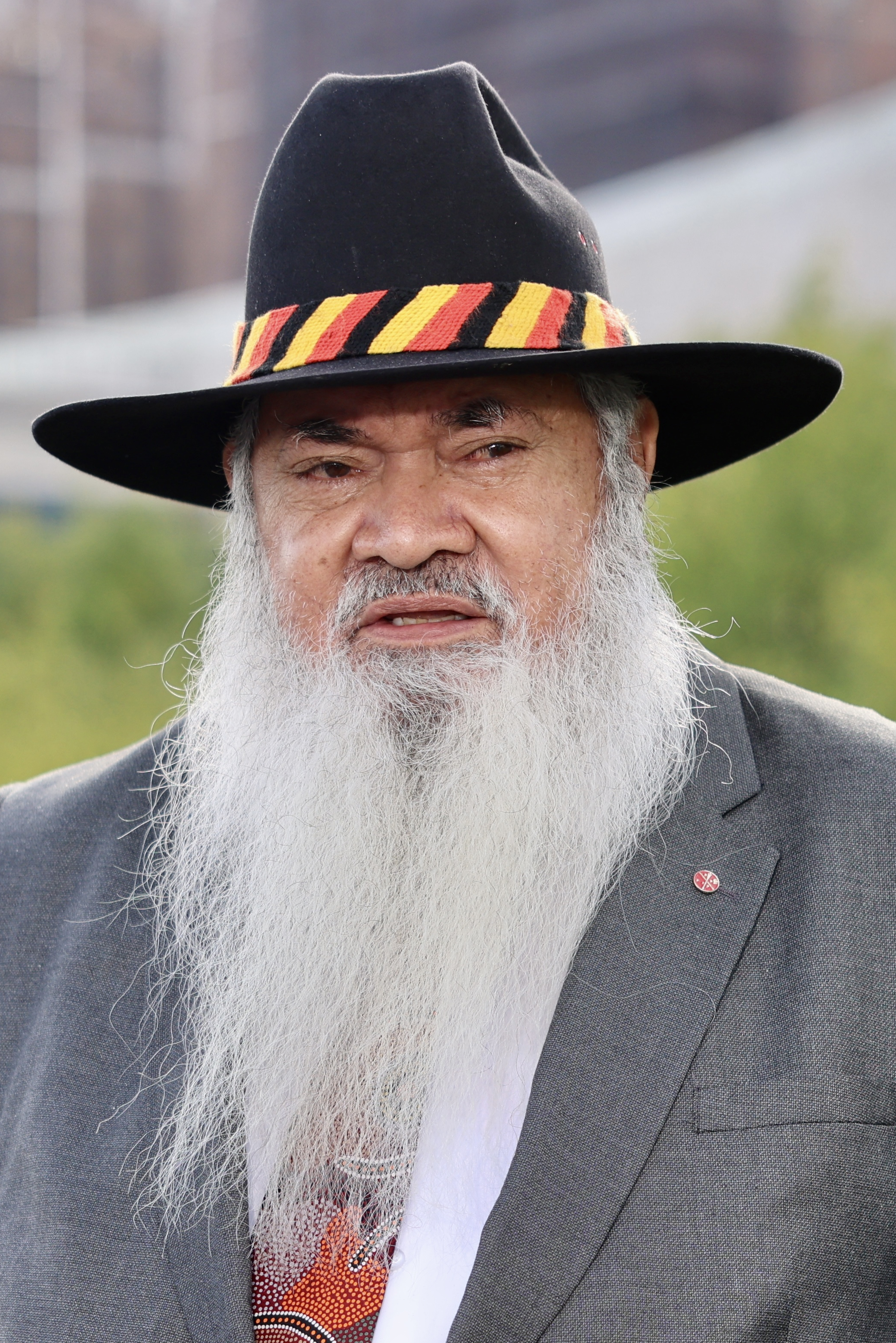
- Dodson in New York City in 2022

Senator for Western Australia
- In office 2 May 2016 – 26 January 2024
- Preceded by: Joe Bullock
- Succeeded by: Varun Ghosh

Special Envoy for Reconciliation and Implementation of the Uluru Statement from the Heart
- In office 1 June 2022 – 26 January 2024
- Preceded by: (position established)
- Succeeded by: (position terminated)

Personal details
- Born: Patrick Lionel Djargun Dodson; 29 January 1948 (age 78) Broome, Western Australia, Australia
- Party: Labor
- Children: 1
- Relatives: Mick Dodson (brother)
- Education: Corpus Christi College, Melbourne

Patrick Lionel Djargun Dodson (born 29 January 1948) is an Australian Indigenous rights activist and former politician. He is often referred to as the "father of reconciliation" owing to his commitment to reconciliation in Australia. He was a Senator for Western Australia from 2016 to 2024, representing the Australian Labor Party (ALP). He is the brother of Mick Dodson.

Dodson is a Aboriginal elder from Broome, Western Australia, who in his younger days was for a short while the first Aboriginal Australian Catholic priest. Dodson was chairman of the Council for Aboriginal Reconciliation and a Commissioner into Aboriginal Deaths in Custody. In 2008 he was awarded the Sydney Peace Prize, and in 2009 the John Curtin Medal. The Parliament of Western Australia appointed Dodson to the Australian Senate on 2 May 2016, following the retirement of Joe Bullock. On 28 November 2023, Dodson announced his retirement from the Senate, which took effect on 26 January 2024, owing to the need for cancer treatment.

== Early life and education ==
Patrick Lionel Djargun Dodson was born on 29 January 1948 in Broome, one of seven children. He is a Yawuru man. His father, John "Snowy" Dodson, was born in Launceston, Tasmania, and his mother, Patricia, was an Aboriginal Australian woman. His grandfather, Paddy Djiagween, was a leader of the Yawura people. When introduced to Queen Elizabeth II when she visited Broome in 1963, he simply asked: "Why can't we have the same rights as the white man?". Dodson's family moved to Katherine, Northern Territory, when Pat was two, to escape Western Australian laws banning mixed-race families. His father had previously been imprisoned for 18 months for "cohabiting with a native woman".

The Dodson children were orphaned after the deaths of both parents only three months apart in 1960 – first their father, and then mother. He and his younger brother Mick, then aged 10, along with a brother Jacko and sister Patricia, were made wards of the state. Two Catholic priests from the Missionaries of the Sacred Heart (MSC) assisted the family by arranging scholarships first for Pat and later Mick, to study at the MSC-run Monivae College in Hamilton, Victoria, which was agreed with their aunt and uncle. Pat won the diligence prize five out of the six years he was there, and became head prefect in 1967. He was also captain of the Australian rules football team at the school, and adjutant of the Cadet Corps. Bill Walsh, father of Phil Walsh, who was later coach of the Adelaide Football Club, ran a department store in the town, and supplied both boys with sports apparel and other clothing.

== Career ==
=== Catholic priesthood ===
After leaving school, Dodson enrolled studied the priesthood at Corpus Christi College, Melbourne, and was ordained in the order of the Missionaries of the Sacred Heart in May 1975. He was the first Aboriginal person to become a Catholic priest in Australia. He left the priesthood in 1981 due to conflicts between Catholicism and his Aboriginal spiritual beliefs. Dodson insisted that many ancient Aboriginal rites celebrated the same spiritual force as Christians worshipped.

=== Industry, government, academia, and community ===
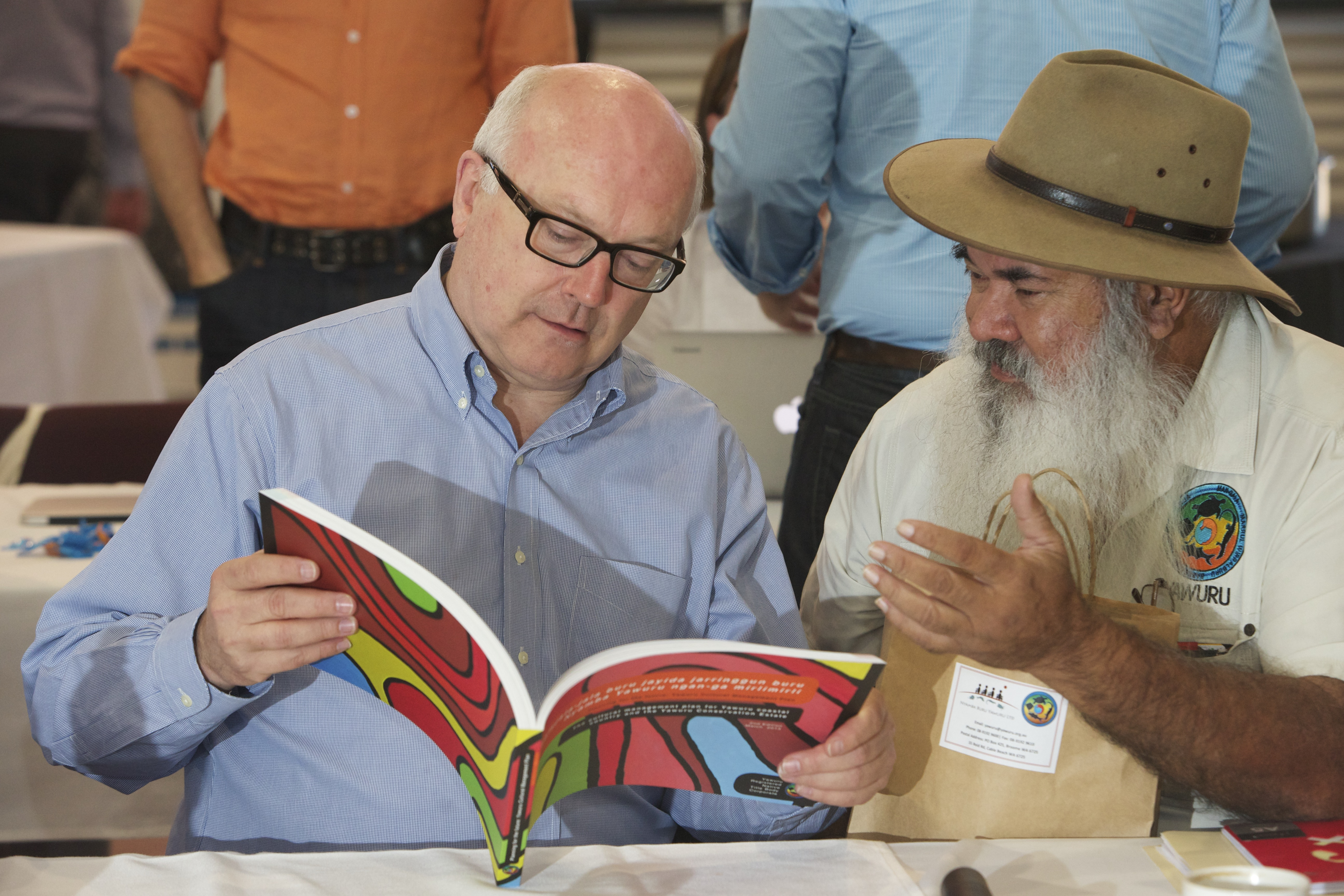
Dodson with Attorney-General George Brandis in 2015

Dodson has been involved in matters relating to Indigenous rights and culture, including working as a consultant advising government, industry, and community groups, his whole life.

In 1981 he joined the Central and Kimberley Land Councils.

He has collaborated with staff at the University of Melbourne through the Cranlana Programme, the Lingiari Foundation, and the NHMRC Kimberley men's health project, and has given key lectures at Trinity College and Newman College.

Roles he has held include:

- Director, Central Land Council, 1985, during which time he successfully negotiated the return of Uluṟu-Kata Tjuṯa National Park to the Aṉangu traditional owners
- Commissioner into Aboriginal Deaths in Custody, 1989
- Director, Kimberley Land Council, 1991
- Inaugural chair of the Council for Aboriginal Reconciliation (CAR), the predecessor of Reconciliation Australia, from 1991 until 1997, when he resigned after not being able to support new land rights legislation introduced by the federal government under John Howard, saying "I fear for the sprit of this country"
- Chairperson, Kimberley Development Commission (term ending November 2010)
- Founding chair, Lingiari Foundation, an Indigenous non-government advocacy and research foundation (2001–2016)
- Inaugural director of the Indigenous Policy, Dialogue and Research Unit at the University of New South Wales (2009–2012)
- Chair, Yawuru Native Title Holders Body Corporate (2010–2013) and Nyamba Buru Yawuru Ltd (2010-2016)
- Co-chair, expert panel on the constitutional recognition of Aboriginal and Torres Strait Islander peoples from 2010 to 2016 (report published 2012)
- Chair, Ecotrust Australia (as of 2011)
- Chair, Kimberley Institute (as of 2011)
- Member of Australian National University Council (2014), the first Aboriginal person on the council
- Adjunct professor at the University of Notre Dame Australia (as of 2016), lecturing in spirituality and the challenges of reconciliation

In 2020 Dodson served on the parliamentary inquiry into the destruction of the caves at the Juukan Gorge in the Pilbara, which delivered its interim report, titled "Never Again" in December 2020 and the full report in October 2021.

=== Politics ===
On 2 March 2016, Dodson was announced as the replacement for Joe Bullock as a Labor senator for Western Australia, following Bullock's resignation. The Parliament of Western Australia appointed Dodson to fill the casual vacancy in the Australian Senate on 2 May 2016. He was sworn in as a senator on the same day, and sat as a Labor senator for Western Australia. He retained his seat at the 2016 federal election. He has served on a number of Senate committees, notably as joint chair of the Joint Select Committee into Constitutional Recognition relating to Aboriginal and Torres Strait Islander Peoples.

Dodson was added to the shadow ministry in May 2016, as a shadow assistant minister. He was initially appointed shadow parliamentary secretary to the Leader of the Opposition, and in July 2016 was shadow assistant minister for Indigenous affairs and Aboriginal and Torres Strait Islanders. Opposition leader Bill Shorten promised to appoint Dodson as Minister for Indigenous Affairs if the ALP won the 2019 federal election. This did not eventuate, and Dodson, while re-elected to the Senate, did not stand for re-election to the Labor frontbench. As the shadow assistant minister for reconciliation and constitutional recognition, Dodson supported the Uluru Statement from the Heart in full. He also served on several senate committees.

Following Labor's victory at the 2022 federal election, Dodson was appointed Special Envoy for Reconciliation and Implementation of the Uluru Statement from the Heart by Prime Minister Anthony Albanese. Owing to illness he was not able to participate fully in the campaign for the Yes vote in the 2023 Voice referendum, and was very disappointed in the result. On 28 November 2023 he announced his intention to resign as a Senator effective 26 January 2024, saying he was unable to serve further due to being treated for cancer earlier in the year.

== Post-retirement activities ==
In May 2025, Dodson appeared on the ABC Television current affairs program 7.30. He called on the Albanese government to continue implementing the remaining requests of the Uluru Statement: a national truth-telling commission (Makarrata) and a treaty. He also urged him to set up regional assemblies, as described by Tom Calma and Marcia Langton in their 2021 report submitted to the Morrison government.

== Recognition and honours ==
Dodson is often referred to as the "father of reconciliation" owing to his role at CAR and his commitment to reconciliation in Australia by constructive dialogue and mutual respect.

In 1997 Dodson was recognised as a National Living Treasure, along with his brother Mick – the only siblings on the list.

In 2004, a portrait of Dodson, then aged 56, was painted by Melbourne-based artist Zhou Xiaoping, which was gifted to the National Portrait Gallery in Canberra by the Lingiari Foundation in 2015.

In 2006, Dodson was awarded an honorary Doctor of Laws degree from the University of Melbourne.

In 2008 he was awarded the Sydney Peace Prize.

In 2009 he was the recipient of the John Curtin Medal, awarded by Curtin University.

In January 2012 Dodson gave the inaugural Gandhi Oration at the University of New South Wales. In the same year, UNSW awarded him an honorary professorship at the end of his term at the Indigenous Policy and Dialogue Research Unit, and later that year an honorary Doctor of Letters degree.

== Personal life ==
Dodson has a daughter, Grace, whose mother is artist Annunciata Dartinga. Grace works full-time as a nurse, and is an artist in her spare time. Both women are based in Peppimenarti, Northern Territory.

In early 2023, Dodson was diagnosed with non-Hodgkin lymphoma, followed by an infection of the oesophagus and shingles. He was treated with chemotherapy and returned from medical leave to campaign for the "Yes" vote at the 2023 Australian Indigenous Voice referendum.
