= Craig Dootson =

English footballer (born 1979)

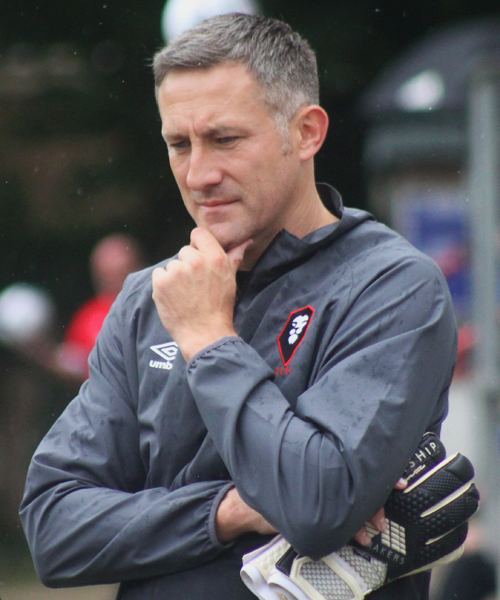
- Dootson coaching Salford City in July 2017

Personal information
- Full name: Craig Dootson
- Date of birth: 23 May 1979 (age 47)
- Place of birth: Preston, England
- Position: Goalkeeper

Senior career*
Years	Team	Apps	(Gls)
1998–1999	Preston North End	0	(0)
1999–2000	Bamber Bridge	70	(0)
2000–2002	Leigh RMI	21	(0)
2002	→ Bradford Park Avenue (loan)	10	(0)
2002–2005	Stalybridge Celtic	89	(0)
2005–2006	Bury	5	(0)
2006	→ Hinckley United (loan)	3	(0)
2006–2009	Hyde United	110	(0)
2009–2010	Alfreton Town	11	(0)
2010	Fleetwood Town	14	(0)
2010–2011	Harrogate Town	7	(0)
2010	→ Fleetwood Town (loan)	0	(0)
2010–2011	Altrincham	12	(0)
2011–2014	Kendal Town	23	(0)
2015	Salford City	0	(0)
Total		375	(0)

Managerial career
- 2019: Kendal Town
- * Club domestic league appearances and goals

Craig Dootson (born 23 May 1979) is an English retired footballer and former goalkeeping coach.

== Playing career ==
=== Preston North End ===
Dootson started out as a trainee at his home town club Preston North End in 1998. Despite appearing in several youth games, Dootson was deemed surplus to requirements and told he would never be tall enough to make the grade and was released without ever making a senior appearance.

=== Bamber Bridge ===
Upon his release from Preston, Dootson had a brief trial with Morecambe but decided to sign for Bamber Bridge and made his debut against Stalybridge Celtic on 31 October 1998. He made 70 appearances with 30 wins and 18 cleansheets. It was his performances that started to get him noticed again and in 2000 Dootson made a move to Leigh RMI for an undisclosed fee.

=== Leigh RMI ===
Quickly established as "The Railwaymen's" number one, Dootson made over 20 first team appearances before a serious knee injury forced him onto the sidelines. When Dootson returned to fitness he found himself unable to break into Leigh's first team again and, despite a quick loan to Bradford Park Avenue, Dootson transferred to Stalybridge Celtic

=== Stalybridge Celtic ===
On 17 August 2002, Stalybridge announced that they had captured the signature of Dootson. Over a period of three years, Dootson kept 37 clean sheets in 125 appearances. Dootson had numerous trials at professional clubs before agreeing terms with Bury.

=== Bury ===
It was only a matter of time before a league club took an interest in Dootson and in the close season of 2005 Bury signed Dootson on a free transfer. Dootson would make limited appearances for "The Shakers" and would go on to break his arm against Barnet and then be unable to claim a regular first team place on his return. Prior to his breakthrough into the 1st team he had a one-month loan to Conference North side Hinckley United in January 2006. He was released by Bury at the end of the season.

=== Hyde United ===
As with other times in his career, Dootson did not have to wait long before being picked up by a club, Conference North side Hyde United moved to secure Dootson as their number 1. Over the three seasons that Dootson spent at Ewen Fields, he made 125 appearances before being transferred to Conference North rivals Alfreton Town at the beginning of the 2009–10 season.

=== Alfreton Town ===
Dootson would spend half a season at the Impact Arena but would find it difficult to travel to Derbyshire from Chorley 3 times a week and formally requested a transfer. It looked like Conference North side Harrogate Town had won the race to sign Dootson but at the last minute Fleetwood town made an undisclosed offer and Dootson decided to join promotion chasing Fleetwood Town instead.

=== Fleetwood Town ===
Dootson joined Fleetwood on 10 November 2009 and helped them to second place in the Conference North, just behind Southport. Fleetwood won a close play-off final against Dootson's old club Alfreton Town 2–1 although Dootson did not take part in this final due to an agreement between the clubs during his transfer.

With Fleetwood's promotion and subsequent decision to go full-time, Dootson decided to remain part-time due to his profession working in the justice system. And although having another year on his deal he left the club in the post season.

=== Harrogate Town ===
It was announced on 2 June 2010 that Harrogate Town had, at the second time of asking, signed Dootson. He made several appearances for Harrogate and following a public argument with the Harrogate manager it was announced he would be rejoining Fleetwood on a three-month loan on 10 September 2010.

=== Altrincham ===
After his three-month loan spell at Fleetwood, Dootson then went on to play for Altrincham then playing in the Conference National. Although he was unable to help them in their relegation battle as they were relegated at the end of the 2010–11 season.

=== Kendal Town ===
As of 14 June 2011, Dootson announced via social networking site Facebook that he had signed for Kendal Town. He instantly found himself a regular first choice keeper. Dootson enjoyed three seasons at "The Mintcakes" before leaving to join big spending Warrington for a brief spell before returning to the Cumbria outfit.

== Post-playing career ==
Dootson had numerous coaching responsibilities. He started his coaching career at AFC Fylde before moving onto Salford City for three and a half years until the end of June 2018.

Dootson has also coached at Leeds United and Tranmere Rovers. On 31 January 2019, Kendal Town appointed Steve Edmondson as their caretaker manager. He took Dootson with him as his assistant manager.

Dootson joined Liverpool F.C. Women as goalkeeping coach in April 2019. After a short break away from the game, Dootson returned to coaching at his home town team Chorley and was part of the famous FA Cup run which saw Chorley reach the 4th round.
