= Dotson =

Dotson is a Welsh surname originating from the Cheshire region. This surname is a patronymic of the Middle English name "Dodde." Originally derived from the Germanic root "dodd" meaning "something rounded", used to denote a short, rotund man . Notable people with this surname include:

- Alphonse Dotson (born 1943), American football player
- Amber Dotson, American country singer
- Bob Dotson, American broadcast journalist
- Carlton Dotson, American college basketball player and murderer
- Chastity Dotson, American actress
- Damyean Dotson, American basketball player
- Demar Dotson (born 1985), American football player
- Devon Dotson (born 1999), American basketball player
- Earl Dotson (born 1970), American football player
- Elijah Dotson (born 1999), American football player
- Gary Dotson, American exonerated of a criminal conviction by DNA evidence
- Jahan Dotson (born 2000), American football player
- Jessie Dotson (born 1974), American mass murderer
- Jimmy Dotson (1933–2017), American blues singer, guitarist and drummer
- Kevin Dotson (disambiguation), multiple people
- Lionel Dotson (born 1985), American football player
- Mello Dotson (born 2002), American football player
- Mentor Dotson (born c. 1837), African American politician
- Richard Dotson (born 1959), American baseball player
- Santana Dotson (born 1969), American football player
- Sam Dotson (born 1970), American police commissioner in St. Louis

== See also ==
- Dotson, Minnesota
- Dodson (disambiguation)
- Dootson, surname
