= Kevin Dodson =

American philosopher

Education
- Education: University of Massachusetts at Amherst (PhD), University of Washington (BA)
- Thesis: Kant's Theory of the Social Contract (1991)
- Doctoral advisor: Robert Paul Wolff

Philosophical work
- Era: 21st-century philosophy
- Region: Western philosophy
- Institutions: Lamar University
- Main interests: Enlightenment, Immanuel Kant, Karl Marx, Existentialism, Frankfurt School

Kevin E. Dodson is an American philosopher and Distinguished Professor Emeritus of Philosophy at Lamar University. He is known for his works on Kant's thought. Dodson is a former president of Phi Kappa Phi’s Lamar University Chapter and a scholarship was named after him.

== Books ==
- Ways of Knowing: Selected Readings, Edited by Kevin Dodson and Jon Avery, Kendall Hunt Publishing; 2nd edition 2000
