= Section 51(xxvi) of the Constitution of Australia =

Power of the Commonwealth to make special laws for the people of any race

Section 51(xxvi) of the Constitution of Australia, commonly called the race power, is the subsection of Section 51 of the Constitution of Australia granting the Australian Commonwealth the power to make special laws for people of any race.

As initially written, s 51(xxvi) empowered the Federal Parliament to make laws with respect to: "The people of any race, other than the aboriginal race in any State, for whom it is deemed necessary to make special laws". The Australian people voting at the 1967 referendum deleted the words in italics, moving and centralising the existing State Parliaments' race power to the Federal government.

Edmund Barton had argued in the 1898 Constitutional Convention that s 51(xxvi) was necessary to enable the Commonwealth to "regulate the affairs of the people of coloured or inferior races who are in the Commonwealth". The section was intended to enable the Commonwealth to pass laws restricting such migrant labourers as the Chinese and Kanakas. Quick and Garran observed in 1901 that "It enables the Parliament to deal with the people of any alien race after they have entered the Commonwealth; to localise them within defined areas, to restrict their migration, to confine them to certain occupations, or to give them special protection and secure their return after a certain period to the country whence they came."

There were delegates, however, at the 1898 Convention who argued against the use of legislative power to deal specifically with alien races, accepting that people might be excluded from Australia based on race, but arguing that once people were admitted to the country they should be treated in the same way as other citizens.

The scope of s 51(xxvi) is, subject to the Constitution itself, unfettered in keeping with s 51 granting plenary powers to the Commonwealth. Section 51(xxvi) supports the rejection of legal equality requirements when considering legislation otherwise validly enacted under the Constitution. Thus legislation empowered by other constitutional powers, such as in the Northern Territory National Emergency Response, which was empowered by section 122, may be racially discriminatory.

The second question in the 1967 referendum amended this section, removing the prohibition on the Commonwealth making laws in regards to "the Aboriginal race". At the time this was largely seen as a positive change for Aboriginal peoples' welfare, as the Commonwealth was seen as being more positive towards them than the states collectively were.

In the 1998 case Kartinyeri v Commonwealth, the High Court was split on whether s 51(xxvi) could be used to enact legislation that adversely discriminated on the basis of race. Justices Gummow and Hayne held that the use of race as the basis of parliamentary power was inherently discriminatory and that benefits to the people of one race may be detrimental to people of another. Justice Kirby disagreed, holding that the race power did not permit the enactment of laws to the detriment of the people of any race. Justice Gaudron held that it was difficult to conceive of circumstances in which a law to the disadvantage of a racial minority would be valid.

The Northern Territory National Emergency Response of 2007–2011, and its continuation as the Stronger Futures policy would have required the use of this section had the Commonwealth implemented it in any of the states. However, as it was implemented only in a territory, this was not the case.

A federal government commissioned report from the "Expert Panel on Constitutional Recognition of Indigenous Australians" on 19 January 2012, recommended that a referendum be held for the repeal of s 51(xxvi), replacing it with new sections s 51A (which would empower the Commonwealth to make laws for Indigenous Australians, but also recognises Aboriginal and Torres Strait Islanders as Australia's first peoples) and s 116A (which would prohibit racially discriminatory legislation or the making of laws under s51A that are not for the benefit of Indigenous peoples).

In 2017, the Referendum Council (with the same initial co-chairs as 2012's Expert Panel) made recommendations echoing those made by that Panel, although not formally including the repeal of section 25 as per the Expert Panel recommendations (2012) and the Joint Select Committee on Constitutional Recognition of Aboriginal and Torres Strait Islander Peoples (2015).
