= Dodgeson =

Defunct American motor vehicle manufacturer

The Dodgeson was an automobile manufactured in Detroit, Michigan by Dodgeson Motors in 1926. The Dodgeson was designed and engineered by John Duval Dodge, son of John Francis Dodge, one of the original Dodge Brothers. The vehicle had a straight-8 rotary valve engine, with a 3.2 litre (196 ci) displacement, and produced 72 bhp (54 kW) at 3,000 rpm. The engine was supported by a four-point suspension system. The designer of the engine was C.E. Wyrick.

== No production ==
Only prototypes were produced, and the series never saw production.
