= Section 25 of the Constitution of Australia =

Provision disqualifying certain races from voting

Section 25 of the Constitution of Australia relates to the apportionment of seats in the House of Representatives. It provides for a state's representation in the House of Representatives to be reduced proportionately if the state excludes people of a certain race from voting.

Although several states had race-based voting restrictions during the 20th century (particularly applying to Indigenous Australians), the number of voters disenfranchised was too small to affect population counts for the purposes of apportionment under section 24 of the constitution. Section 25 has been seen as redundant by some authors given the entrenchment of universal suffrage in Australia and has been proposed for removal by several constitutional reviews.

== Text ==
For the purposes of the last section, if by the law of any State all persons of any race are disqualified from voting at elections for the more numerous House of the Parliament of the State, then, in reckoning the number of the people of the State or of the Commonwealth, persons of that race resident in that State shall not be counted.

== History ==
The section was proposed during the 1891 constitutional convention by Andrew Inglis Clark, the then Tasmanian Attorney-General. Clark adapted the wording from section 2 of the Fourteenth Amendment to the US Constitution, which was introduced in 1868 following the US Civil War during the Reconstruction era and intended to deter states from excluding certain races from voting in the United States of America. Unlike section 25 in Australia, however, the US provision made no direct reference to race.

At the time what became section 25 was introduced to the draft there was not intended to be a separate federal franchise. Rather, those permitted to vote in lower house elections at state level would form the make-up of the Commonwealth franchise. One argument is that the drafters included it to ensure that a state could not on the one hand exclude people of a race from voting at the Commonwealth level, while also benefiting from their inclusion in the population when determining the number of representatives that state would elect to the House of Representatives. During the convention, it was argued that such a clause should be broader in order to prevent disenfranchisement such as that caused by property ownership qualifications in Western Australia, but this was never expanded on as it would have had no deterrent effect given Western Australia was to receive the minimum five representatives upon federation regardless. Later in the drafting process, section 30 was introduced, allowing the Commonwealth to legislate its own voting franchise, thus enabling the Commonwealth government to theoretically exclude certain races from voting in federal elections with no corresponding effect on the number of representatives in each state. Section 25 was nevertheless retained despite this change.

Despite section 25's purported intention to deter future disenfranchisement on the basis of race, inline with the purpose of the Fourteenth Amendment to the United States Constitution, in practice it has been of little effect to date. The existence of section 127 in the Constitution, which excluded Aboriginal people from being counted in population data, meant that the exclusion of Aboriginal people from state franchise had no effect on a state's population in applying section 24 to determine the make-up of the House of Representatives, as Aboriginal people were excluded from the population for the purposes of determining a state's proportion of seats anyway. Likewise, it had little effect on exclusion of other races, such as Queensland's exclusion of indigenous populations of other nations, as they were either insignificant in number in relation to the broader population or could be excluded by other means, such as on the basis of nationality under the Immigration Restriction Act 1901 and similar barriers, such as language testing, which would not trigger section 25. By the time section 127 was repealed in 1967, allowing the Aboriginal population to be counted in determining representation in federal parliament, all states already included Aboriginal people in their respective franchises, with the last state to do so being Queensland two years earlier.

There has been no direct High Court judgements relating to the application of section 25. This is largely because its existence has always been of little to no effect to date, and because any dispute over its application is unlikely to have been in relation to a population large enough to have any effect on the representation numbers in Parliament. It has however been referred to in numerous cases, in relation to matters such as universal franchise, voting equality, and the definition of people of the Commonwealth. High Court Justice Kirby referred to it in passing as support for the proposition that racial qualifications have been eliminated from voting.

== Reform ==
The repeal of section 25 has been put to referendum twice. In 1967, alongside the referendum in relation to Aboriginals, it was put forward to be repealed as part of an amendment to the Constitution that would have removed the nexus between the number of representatives in the House of Representatives and the number of senators in the Senate. The nexus question failed to get a majority nationwide, receiving just 40% of the yes vote, and only passed with a majority in New South Wales.

Later, in 1974, section 25 was to be repealed as part of a constitutional amendment enshrining the concept of "one vote, one value" in the Constitution by ensuring electorates at state and federal level would be based on population and not geographic size or other methods. Again, this referendum was defeated, receiving only 47% of the national yes vote, and only attaining a majority in New South Wales. Both these referendums failed for reasons more complex than any controversy surrounding the removal of section 25.

=== Contemporary proposals ===
Recommendations for the repeal of section 25 date back as far as the 1959 Parliamentary Joint Committee on Constitutional Review.

The 1975 Australian Constitutional Convention referred to the section as outmoded and expended and recommended it be repealed. Likewise, the Constitutional Commission in 1988 suggested it be repealed on the basis that it was outmoded and archaic.

In a roundtable discussion on reforming the Constitution by the House Standing Committee on Legal and Constitutional Affairs in 2008, Chapter 5.9 of the submission stated that:

Section 25 no longer has any significant legal effect, as the Racial Discrimination Act 1975 (Cth) would prevent the States from discriminating against people on grounds of race. Nevertheless, section 25 'recognises that people might constitutionally be denied the franchise on the ground of race'.

In their submission to the Expert Panel on Constitutional Recognition of Indigenous Australians in 2010, the Centre for Comparative Constitutional Studies recommended section 25 to be repealed.

Section 25 has often been described as a relic from Australia's constitutional history which should be removed.

Along with the Joint Select Committee on Constitutional Recognition of Aboriginal and Torres Strait Islander Peoples in 2015, the Expert Panel has described their contribution in 2012 as only the 'first word, not the last word'. The Joint Select Committees in 2015 and 2018 discussed the removal of section 25 as a roundtable discussion question and recommended it to be repealed.

More recently, it has been suggested section 25 be removed on the basis that it contemplates the possibility that a state may disenfranchise a race of people. The Expert Panel on Recognising Aboriginal and Torres Strait Islander Peoples in the Constitution, in a report released in January 2012, among other things, recommended that section 25 be removed. As Anne Twomey suggests, some of the criticism surrounding section 25 is possibly misguided, with some contributors on the panel seeming to be of the belief that section 25 allows a state to prohibit people of a race from voting in the future, given the wording of the section. She argues that section 25 neither allows nor disallows such action, but merely disapproves or deters it. However, she advises removing it as part of a wider effort to remove race from the Constitution appropriate given it has no practical effect at present, due to the existence of the Racial Discrimination Act 1975.

There have been arguments that the application of the Racial Discrimination Act 1975 now means that a state could not prevent people of a race from being able to vote, and that due to this section 25 is spent. However, as the Racial Discrimination Act is not constitutionally enshrined, such protection is not permanently guaranteed. Regardless, the High Court may read down the Act from applying in this way so as not to allow the Commonwealth to infringe on a state's ability to legislate on its own constitutional matters as in Austin v Commonwealth. Additionally, the Racial Discrimination Act may be suspended under section 8(1), as it was through the Northern Territory Intervention in 2007. The Hindmarsh Island bridge case highlighted the fact that the effectiveness of the Racial Discrimination Act could easily be defeated by new legislation and the 'race power'.
