= Indigenous advisory bodies in Australia =

Aboriginal and Torres Strait Islander advisory bodies

Australian Indigenous advisory bodies are Aboriginal and Torres Strait Islander advisory bodies established or proposed to be established by the Commonwealth and state and territory governments. Calls for such bodies, especially for a Commonwealth level Voice to Parliament, became prominent following the release of the Uluru Statement from the Heart, however similar bodies of various levels of independence have existed since the official end of assimilationist policies in the 1970s and the promotion of self-determination and reconciliation. Such bodies generally advise governments on policies and programmes that affect Indigenous Australians, and represent Indigenous interests in public debate. Other advisory bodies have been established in the context of state treaty process, to advise governments and Indigenous groups to prepare for upcoming negotiations.

While the proposed Voice was unique in its proposed implementation through a constitutional amendment, most other advisory bodies are typically proposed to be established via legislation, with their membership democratically elected by First Nations communities. The membership of these bodies is usually made up of representatives from a range of Indigenous organisations and communities. The specific proposed roles and responsibilities of Indigenous advisory bodies varies.

== Commonwealth ==
=== Current Commonwealth bodies ===
The Coalition of Peaks is an unincorporated body that represents more than 80 Indigenous community groups and peak organisations across Australia. Under a partnership agreement with the Council of Australian Governments (now National Cabinet), Australian governments have promised to consult with the Coalition of Peaks in the creation, implementation and reform of Closing the Gap policies. It is the only federal body representing Indigenous Australian that advises the Commonwealth, and its role is limited to the Closing the Gap strategy.

=== Past Commonwealth bodies ===
==== Early proposals and advisory bodies ====
The creation of a federal advisory body with Indigenous members was proposed by the Aborigines Progressive Association (APA) in the 1930s. Following the Day of Mourning protests in 1938, an APA delegation met with Prime Minister Joseph Lyons and Interior Minister John McEwen. The list of ten policy demands drafted by APA leader Jack Patten included the creation of "an Advisory Board, consisting of six persons, three of whom at least should be of Aboriginal blood, to be nominated by the Aborigines Progressive Association".

The APA proposals were rejected by Lyons and McEwen on the grounds that the federal government had no constitutional power to implement them. The subsequent New Deal for Aborigines was drafted without direct reference to Indigenous people, with anthropologist Ernest Chinnery appointed in 1940 as the first Commonwealth Advisor on Native Affairs. At a 1967 referendum, a constitutional amendment was approved granting the federal government the power to make special laws for Indigenous Australians. Prime Minister Harold Holt subsequently announced the creation of the Council for Aboriginal Affairs (CAA) to advise the government on Indigenous policy. The CAA remained active until 1976, but none of its members – H. C. Coombs, Barrie Dexter and Bill Stanner – were Indigenous.

In 1972, the McMahon government organised the National Conference of Aboriginal and Torres Strait Islander Advisory Councillors in Canberra, consisting of 66 delegates from state and territory organisations. Peter Howson, minister responsible for the newly created Department of the Environment, Aborigines and the Arts, announced that the conference would be "a truly representative expression of Aboriginal views". The conference passed resolutions in support of the Aboriginal Tent Embassy and Indigenous land rights, both of which were contrary to government policy, but did not emerge as a standing advisory body.

Since 1973, there have been five national Indigenous bodies advising Australian governments. Four were elected and one (the National Indigenous Council) was appointed by the federal government. Other state and territory Indigenous advisory bodies have also been established in some jurisdictions since 2008.

==== 1973–1976: National Aboriginal Consultative Committee ====
The National Aboriginal Consultative Committee (NACC) was created in February 1973 by the Whitlam government's minister for Aboriginal Affairs, Gordon Bryant, with the help of Charles Perkins. Its principal function was to advise the Department of Aboriginal Affairs (DAA) and the minister on issues of concern to Aboriginal and Torres Strait Islander people. Its members were elected by Indigenous people, who had a turnout of 78% of the 36,338 people on its electoral roll, in November 1973. While it maintained a good relationship with Bryant, it had strong detractors in the DAA. The NACC saw itself as a legislative body, while the government expected them to be purely advisory, and this, along with other conflicts over the name, funding levels and control led to the end of the organisation. The Fraser government commissioned the 1976 Hiatt Committee review of the body, which concluded that it had not functioned as a consultative committee nor been effective in providing advice to government or making its activities known to most Aboriginal people.

==== 1977–1985: National Aboriginal Congress ====
The NACC was reconstituted in 1977 as the National Aboriginal Congress (NAC). Changes included a move to indirect voting of members through regional representatives, a lower budget and a more explicit advisory role. The Hawke government commissioned the Coombs Review into the NAC in 1983, which found that the body was not held in high regard by the Aboriginal community. After being starved of funds, the NAC was abolished by the Hawke government in 1985. In 1988, the Barunga Statement called for a new elected body to be created.

==== 1990–2005: Aboriginal and Torres Strait Islander Commission ====
The Aboriginal and Torres Strait Islander Commission (ATSIC) was established by the Hawke government on 5 March 1990 as an elected body which had responsibility for administering Indigenous programs and service delivery. It was successful in some areas as being a combined deliverer of services; however, low voter turnout for ATSIC elections, allegations of corruption and a lack of government support led to the demise of the organisation. A 2003 review recommended various changes, including more control of the organisation by Aboriginal and Torres Strait Islander people at a regional level. The Howard government (with Amanda Vanstone as Aboriginal Affairs minister) decided not to implement these changes however, instead abolishing ATSIC on 24 March 2005, with the support of the Labor party under Mark Latham.

==== 2004–2008: National Indigenous Council ====
In November 2004 the Howard government established the National Indigenous Council (NIC), following a proposal earlier in the year. A government inquiry into the demise of ATSIC recommended in March 2005 "that the NIC be a temporary body, to exist only until a proper national, elected representative body is in place". The same inquiry found that, although the members were respected, there was absolutely no support for the institution; only the government regarded it as legitimate. In early 2008, the NIC was disbanded.

==== 2009–2019: National Congress of Australia's First Peoples ====
In December 2008, the Rudd government asked the Australian Human Rights Commission to develop a new elected Indigenous representative body. This was announced as the National Congress of Australia's First Peoples in November 2009, and was established as a body independent of government. Fewer than 10,000 Indigenous people signed up as members to elect congress delegates, and the Abbott government cut off its main funding stream in 2013. It went into voluntary administration in June 2019, before ceasing completely in October 2019. Calls for a new voice came from the Cape York Institute, headed by Noel Pearson, in 2012 and 2015.

==== 2013–2019: Prime Minister's Indigenous Advisory Council ====
The government appointed Prime Minister's Indigenous Advisory Council was established by prime minister Tony Abbott on 25 September 2013. It consisted of 12 members, both Indigenous and non-Indigenous, who would meet three times each year. It was initially chaired by Warren Mundine. Prime minister Malcolm Turnbull restructured the body in early 2017, reducing its size to six members, and abolishing the role of chair. It was later given a pair of co-chairs. It held its last meeting in early 2019.

== New South Wales ==
The NSW Aborigines Advisory Council was established under the Aborigines Act 1969. It consisted of nine Aboriginal people who had been elected by the people to represent Aboriginal people of a particular area of the state, for a three-year term. Its inaugural meeting was held on 11 February 1971. The Council discussed topics such as proposed amendments to the Aborigines Act, education, health, housing, the management of Aboriginal reserves and various projects. In 1974, all members of the Advisory Council became members of the Aboriginal Lands Trust of New South Wales, which had been established by the Aborigines (Amendment) Act 1973. The last meeting of the Advisory Council was held on 11 October 1976.

As of October 2023 New South Wales had not committed to establishing a state voice to Parliament. The Labor NSW government, headed by premier Chris Minns, came to power promising to spend $5 million on consultation for a treaty process. However, following the defeat of the referendum, there has been no commitment to further action, with the premier stating in October 2023 that "[a]ll we're promising is to start that dialogue" and that any proposed further developments would be taken to an election before being implemented.

== Victoria ==
The First Peoples' Assembly of Victoria is a body of 31 elected and appointed members representing Aboriginal Victorians. 22 "General Members" are elected via optional preferential voting in 5 multi-member electorates (known as "Regions"). General Members receiving a sufficient quota in each Region are elected, with the lowest ranking male candidates excluded until at least 40% of the members elected to a region are non-male. 10 "Reserved Members" are appointed, with a member selected by each of the government recognised traditional owner groups. Additional Reserved Member seats may be granted by the assembly on application by an Aboriginal group.

The main task of the Assembly is to work out the rules by which individual treaties will be negotiated between the Victoria Government and the various Aboriginal peoples. It will also establish an independent umpire, the Treaty Authority, to oversee negotiations between Aboriginal groups and the Victoria Government and ensure fairness. It will also establish a fund to help negotiations are take place on an even financial footing among the various groups, and debate and decide which ideas, laws, policies and rights will be the subject of treaty negotiations.

The assembly meets in the chamber of the upper house of the Victorian Parliament, the Victorian Legislative Council. It met for the first time on 10 December 2019, and again met over two days in February 2020. The assembly hopes to agree upon a framework, umpire and process before November 2022, the date of the next state election. The Labor government under Daniel Andrews was supportive, but the Coalition had not made a clear commitment to supporting the treaty process.

On 11 July 2020, the Victorian Government announced that it would establish a truth and reconciliation commission for Aboriginal Australians in Victoria, the first ever in Australia, with the terms of reference to be worked out collaboratively. The 21 elected members of the assembly would consult with their communities and work with the Victoria Government to design the process. The announcement was welcomed by the community. The 2017 Uluru Statement from the Heart called for a similar commission to be established at a national level.

The assembly's first election was in November 2019, however the Yorta Yorta Nation Aboriginal Corporation, declined to participate in the election process. On 3 August 2020, the assembly held its first official negotiation meeting with Aboriginal Affairs Minister Gabrielle Williams. The assembly held its second election in 2023, and new co-chairs were elected.

On 9 September 2025, Premier Jacinta Allan introduced a bill in the Legislative Assembly, the Statewide Treaty Bill 2025, to enact and implement a statewide treaty, as well as making the First Peoples' Assembly a permanent authority under an umbrella body known as Gellung Warl. The body would include an independent accountability mechanism, as required by the National Agreement on Closing the Gap.

=== Yoorrook Justice Commission ===
In July 2020, the Victorian Government became the first state or territory to commit to the creation of a truth and justice commission to "formally recognise historical wrongs and ongoing injustices" against Aboriginal people. The commission was named the Yoorrook Justice Commission, and aims to establish an official public record of the experience of Aboriginal Victorians since the start of British colonisation in Victoria. Its official objectives include:

- the development of "a shared understanding among all Victorians of the impact of colonisation, as well as the diversity, strength and resilience of First Peoples' cultures"
- the determination of "the causes and consequences of Systemic Injustice including the role of State policies and laws" and "which State or Non-State Entities bear responsibility for the harm suffered by First Peoples"
- assistance building "the foundations of a new relationship between the State of Victoria and First Peoples and all Victorians, based on truth and justice to prevent the recurrence of injustice"
- supporting "the treaty making process between the State of Victoria and First Peoples"
- the identification of "Systemic Injustice which currently impedes First Peoples".

The Commission has released several interim reports, with its final report planned to be released in 2025. The report will include recommendations for reform and redress, and will inform Victoria's treaty negotiations.

As of September 2024 commissioners are:

- Eleanor Bourke, chair (Wergaia/ Wamba Wamba Elder)
- Sue-Anne Hunter (Wurundjeri and Ngurai Illum Wurrung woman)
- Travis Lovett (Kerrupmara/Gunditjmara man)
- Maggie Walter (Palawa woman)
- Anthony North (non-Indigenous)

Previous commissioners are:

- Kevin Bell (non-Indigenous)
- Wayne Atkinson (Yorta Yorta-Dja Dja Wurrung Elder)

Uncle Jack Charles was the first Indigenous elder to speak about his experiences at the first set of public hearings, or wurrek tyerrang, in April 2021. A second block of hearings was scheduled for late May. Elders were invited to speak about their direct experiences and perspectives, based on their preparedness to tell their truths in a public setting. Others would be able to share their stories in submissions, or nuther-mooyoop, in writing, audio or video form, or as an object such as an artwork.

In May 2023 the Victorian Government admitted to the commission that state systems had failed to properly monitor the progress of initiatives that are intended to help reduce the numbers of Indigenous children in state care, disproportionate incarceration of Indigenous people, especially youth, and Aboriginal deaths in custody. In September 2023 the Commission proposed 46 recommendations to improve the child protection and criminal justice systems in Victoria, including raising the age of criminal responsibility from 10 to 14 years of age, after finding that Aboriginal children were 21 times more likely to be in foster care in Victoria than non-Aboriginal children, and over the previous ten years, the rates of Aboriginal men on remand had grown by nearly 600%. The report was welcomed by Victoria Police, and Anne Ferguson, the Chief Justice of Victoria, said that changes may be made after considering the report.

== Queensland ==
Under the Palaszczuk Labor government initiated "Path to Treaty" process, an appointed Interim Truth and Treaty Body was established in 2022, to advise the Queensland Government on the creation of laws to facilitate treaty negotiations. These laws also set up a Truth-telling and Healing Inquiry and a Treaty Institute. After a criticised delay, on 26 April 2024 the laws were proclaimed to put them into effect, with Joshua Creamer (chair), Roslyn Atkinson, Cheryl Buchanan, Ivan Ingram and Vonda Malone appointed as commissioners to lead the truth telling inquiry. While these laws initially passed with bi-partisan support, the LNP withdraw their support following the failure of the Voice to Parliament referendum. While maintaining their commitment to the Truth-telling inquiry, the premier in response declared that any treaties would require bi-partisan support.

The opposition Liberal National Party of Queensland (LNP) won the 2024 Queensland state election and repealed the Path to Treaty Act 2023 while also directing that the Truth-telling and Healing Inquiry end.

== Western Australia ==
The Aboriginal Advisory Council of Western Australia is a statutory body that has operated since 1972 which advises the WA government (through the Minister for Aboriginal Affairs) on Aboriginal issues. While some have praised the effectiveness of the body, others have criticised it as a "toothless tiger" that is unable to properly hold the government to account on Aboriginal issues. The body is appointed by the minister, after being "peer-nominated".

== South Australia ==
In May 2021, South Australian premier Steven Marshall announced his government's intention to create the state's first First Nations Voice to Parliament. After the election of a state Labor government in 2022, new premier Peter Malinauskas pledged to implement this state-based Voice to Parliament, as well as restarting treaty talks. In July 2022 Dale Agius was appointed as the state's first commissioner for First Nations Voice. In January 2023 the government secured the support of the Greens for a bill to be debated in parliament later in the year. The process includes the election of 40 people by Aboriginal and Torres Strait Islander people enrolled to vote for members specific to their geographic area, with 12 of these forming a statewide Voice, which is entitled to address the parliament on any bill being debated. An open letter was sent in early January to Agius and Kyam Maher (Attorney-General of South Australia and Minister for Aboriginal Affairs) by Native Title Services SA on behalf of most of the native title bodies, voicing some concerns about aspects of the model. Maher said that their concerns would be taken into consideration and a formal structure would exist to take into account their views.

One Nation's sole MP Sarah Game expressed her opposition to the legislation, and the South Australian Liberal Party announced its opposition to the proposed voice, saying that it was flawed. The bill passed in a special Sunday sitting of parliament on 26 March 2023 and was given royal assent immediately afterwards in a public event on the steps of Parliament House. Thousands of onlookers attended the event, watching some of the events inside the building projected live onto large screens.

Implementation of the SA Voice was delayed for six months owing to possible confusion introduced by the debate about the national referendum on a national Voice in October. Elections for the Voice took place on 16 March 2024. Turnout was low, with less than 10% of eligible voters participating, which was the target of criticism by the Liberal Party. Kyam Maher described the election as successful, saying that the result provides a base for the voice to build awareness and engagement. The inaugural meeting of the Voice held on 12 June 2024 elected Central region representative Tahlia Wanganeen and West Coast representative Leeroy Bilney elected presiding members.

On 21 March 2026, the same day as the 2026 South Australian state election, 46 new members were elected, many unopposed, as there was a drop in the number of candidates. However, more people voted, with 3504, up from 2748 votes in the previous election. Many members of the Stolen Generations are not yet on the electoral roll owing to distrust of officialdom.

Cory Bernardi, elected to the Upper House in the state election as SA leader of One Nation, wants to abolish the Voice, saying it costs too much. The base rate of an ordinary Voice member is $3000, while state members receive an extra $7500 for their higher duties and workload. Most of the work is done in the members' communities; in the first two years, they only travelled to Adelaide once, for induction. Members of the SA Parliament earn a base salary of around $197,270. In mid-May, SA Legislative Council opposition leader Nicola Centofanti, introduced a bill to repeal the Voice. In response, the Voice issued a statement rejecting the proposal, saying that "Supporting the Bill reinforces systemic racism, silencing the very mechanism created to ensure First Nations people have a fair and structured say in decisions that directly affect [their] lives... It is difficult to reconcile claims about delivering practical outcomes for Aboriginal South Australians while seeking to repeal a legislated mechanism designed to support exactly that... the Voice is a practical, efficient and cost-effective model that improves decision-making, [and] strengthens accountability".

== Tasmania ==
A six member body "Aboriginal Advisory group" was established in December 2022, to advise the Tasmanian Government on treaty and truth-telling. The body received criticism from other Tasmanian Aboriginal groups as not-representative of all Tasmanian Aboriginal people. Membership was appointed by the minister, following nomination "by Tasmanian Aboriginal people, through an open process".

== Australian Capital Territory ==
The Aboriginal and Torres Strait Islander Elected Body (ATSIEB) was established in 2008. As of 2023, ATSIEB has seven elected members, including a chairperson and deputy chairperson. Members of ATSIEB have portfolio responsibilities mirroring the ACT Government and the body is supported by a secretariat. Members work part time and are paid $15,000 for seven hours of work per week. The body also conducts senate style estimates, questioning the heads of government departments.

Elections to ATSIEB are conducted by Elections ACT. Any Aboriginal or Torres Strait Islander person over the age of 18 living in the ACT is eligible to vote in ATSIEB elections. The most recent election was held in 2021 and had a turnout of 267 voters, only 2.8% of the territory's Indigenous population. This low turnout rate has been identified as key risk to the body's continuing effectiveness. Other challenges the body faces include a significant attrition rate in membership, inter-tribal conflict between the Ngunnawal and Ngambri and a lack of resources provided by the ACT government.

== Northern Territory ==
The Northern Territory does not currently have a territory-based Indigenous Voice to Parliament.

== See also ==
- Assembly of First Nations (Canada)
- Australian Aboriginal sovereignty
- Australian Aboriginal Progressive Association, the first Aboriginal activist organisation
- Bureau of Indian Affairs (United States)
- Indigenous treaties in Australia
- Māori politics, in New Zealand
  - Māori electorates
  - Māori wards and constituencies
  - New Zealand Māori Council
  - Te Puni Kōkiri
- Sámi parliament (disambiguation), several bodies representing Sámi peoples in the Nordic countries and Russia
- List of Indigenous Australian politicians
- List of Indigenous Australians in politics and public service
