= Statewide Treaty Act 2025 =

2025 legislation in Victoria, Australia

Parliament of Victoria
- Long title: An Act to establish a First Peoples' representative and deliberative body named Gellung Warl, to amend the Advancing the Treaty Process with Aboriginal Victorians Act 2018 and the Treaty Authority and Other Treaty Elements Act 2022, to consequentially amend other Acts and for other purposes.
- Citation: Statewide Treaty Act 2025 (VIC) (No. 45 of 2025)
- Territorial extent: Victoria
- Passed by: Legislative Assembly
- Passed: 16 October 2025
- Passed by: Legislative Council
- Passed: 30 October 2025
- Assented to by: Governor Margaret Gardner
- Assented to: 13 November 2025
- Commenced: 14 November 2025 (s. 1–8, 190–200, 229); 1 May 2026 (rest of act)
- Administered by: Department of Premier and Cabinet

Legislative history

Initiating chamber: Legislative Assembly
- Bill title: Statewide Treaty Bill 2025
- Introduced by: Jacinta Allan
- First reading: 9 September 2025
- Second reading: 14–16 October 2025 (debated)
- Voting summary: 54 voted for; 27 voted against; 7 absent
- Third reading: 16 October 2025
- Voting summary: 54 voted for; 27 voted against; 7 absent

Revising chamber: Legislative Council
- Bill title: Statewide Treaty Bill 2025
- Received from the Legislative Assembly: 16 October 2025
- Member(s) in charge: Lizzie Blandthorn
- First reading: 16 October 2025
- Second reading: 28 October 2025 (debated)
- Voting summary: 22 voted for; 17 voted against; 1 absent
- Committee of the whole: 30 October 2025
- Third reading: 30 October 2025
- Voting summary: 21 voted for; 16 voted against; 3 absent

Final stages
- Finally passed both chambers: 30 October 2025

Amends
- Treaty Authority and Other Treaty Elements Act 2022; Advancing the Treaty Process with Aboriginal Victorians Act 2018; Aboriginal Heritage Act 2006; Aboriginal Lands Act 1970; Audit Act 1994; Freedom of Information Act 1982; Health Records Act 2001; Heritage Act 2017; Independent Broad-based Anti-Corruption Commission Act 2011; Integrity Oversight Victoria Act 2011; Interpretation of Legislation Act 1984; Land Tax Act 2005; Ombudsman Act 1973; Payroll Tax Act 2007; Privacy and Data Protection Act 2014; Public Administration Act 2004; Public Interest Disclosure Act 2012; Public Records Act 1973; Subordinate Legislation Act 1994

Keywords
- Indigenous rights in Australia, Indigenous treaties in Australia
- Status: In force

The Statewide Treaty Act 2025 is an act of parliament in the Australian state of Victoria that legislates the Statewide Treaty (often referred to as the Treaty for Victoria) with Victoria's Indigenous peoples. The legislation gives effect to the first treaty with Indigenous peoples anywhere in Australia. The treaty is a binding agreement between the state of Victoria and the First Peoples' Assembly of Victoria. Signed on 13 November 2025, the agreement establishes a permanent First Peoples' Representative Body known as Gellung Warl and sets the framework for future local treaties with Traditional Owners. The Statewide Treaty Act received royal assent on the same day.

Efforts have been made in the past to create a treaty with Indigenous Australians, such as in 1988 when the Barunga Statement was presented to then-Prime Minister Bob Hawke, and in 1835 when colonial explorer John Batman acquired a parcel of land in what he said was a treaty with Indigenous people.

The Liberal–National Coalition and One Nation have vowed to repeal the legislation if they win government at the 28 November 2026 state election. Independent senator Lidia Thorpe criticised the treaty for not reflecting the "free, prior and informed consent" of all the state's Indigenous peoples. She also criticised the treaty for integrating with "colonial government systems" rather than delivering full sovereign independence.

== History ==
The path to treaty has seen movements made to establish such a binding document at the federal and state level many times, such as in 1835 when colonial explorer John Batman laid claim to a treaty from the state's local Indigenous people that he could occupy land beside the Yarra River which he said was valid for 500,000 hectares of land. He was rebuffed by the New South Wales Governor, Richard Bourke, who said that only the Crown could make agreements of that type whereas Batman was acting on behalf of the Port Phillip Association. The claim of this treaty's existence has been doubted by historians and the Yoorrook Justice Commission. Future efforts at creating a treaty included in the late 1970s when Herbert Cole 'Nugget' Coombs and Judith Wright established the Aboriginal Treaty Committee which was active from 1979 to 1983 and aimed to raise awareness of treaty-related issues amongst the non-Indigenous population. In 1988, the Barunga Statement was presented to prime minister Bob Hawke which called for a treaty between Indigenous peoples and the government, Hawke supported but did not eventuate.

In March 2016, Victorian premier Daniel Andrews announced that the state government would commit to a treaty-making process with Indigenous peoples. He also announced that the government would commit to reforms that aim to advance self-determination for Indigenous peoples. The Aboriginal Treaty Working Group was established in July and later concluded that a representative body was needed.

In late 2017, the Aboriginal Community Assembly was established which was made up of 31 members and was tasked with assessing key questions relating to a representative body such as community representation, governance and structural elements. In December, a Victorian Treaty Advancement Commission was established and was chaired by Jill Gallagher. The body's main tasks were to establish greater momentum for the treaty-making process and establish an Aboriginal representative body. The final report of the Treaty Advancement Commission was submitted in March 2018 and toured 30 locations to showcase their proposals.

In 2018, the Parliament of Victoria passed the Advancing the Treaty Process with Aboriginal Victorians Bill 2018 which formally legislated a treaty-making body. In 2019, the Aboriginal representative body was established and became the First Peoples' Assembly of Victoria. The state government established a truth-telling forum known as the Yoorrook Justice Commission in 2021.

The Victorian Labor Party took the proposal to the election in 2022. They won the election so treaty processes continued. The Victorian Liberal Party declared their support for the government's process of negotiating a treaty in 2022, but Liberal Party member Tim Smith indicated that he would vote against any proposed legislation on this matter. The Treaty Authority and Other Treaty Elements Bill 2022 passed parliament in August. The bill established the Treaty Authority which aimed to expand consultation with Indigenous peoples and act as an umpire for these negotiations.

The Legislative Council voted 31 votes to three for the Treaty Authority and Other Treaty Elements Bill 2022. The three who voted against the bill were the two Liberal Democrats Tim Quilty and David Limbrick, and former Liberal turned Democratic Labour Bernie Finn.

In October 2022, a Treaty Negotiation Framework was set up which sets out rules and conditions for negotiating a treaty. Also in October 2022, a Self-Determination Fund was introduced which allows Aboriginal Victorians to conduct treaty negotiations on an equal standing with the state government.

In 2024, the Victorian Liberal and National opposition announced that they would be withdrawing its support for treaty, reversing their previous support for the proposal. Negotiations for the treaty officially commenced in the latter part of that year.

The bill to enshrine a treaty in law was introduced to parliament on 9 September 2025. This legislation passed the Legislative Council on 30 October 2025, with 21 votes in favour to 16 against. Labor, the Greens, the Animal Justice Party and Legalise Cannabis Victoria voted in favour of the bill while the Liberals and Nationals, Shooters, Fishers and Farmers, Libertarian Party and One Nation voted against.

The treaty formally commenced on 12 December 2025, following a ceremonial event and performances at John Cain Arena. The ceremonial treaty signed on the day is made of kangaroo skin and the leaders used ochre to sign the treaty with their handprints.

== Provisions ==
The treaty establishes Gellung Warl (meaning "Tip of the Spear" in Gunaikurnai) as the "First Peoples' representative and deliberative body". Schedule B of the treaty outlines specific "Immediate Statewide Treaty Reforms" to be implemented by the state government and Gellung Warl, these include: making the First Peoples' Assembly of Victoria permanent and establishing a requirement that the body be consulted by the government on new laws affecting Indigenous people; Nginma Ngainga Wara (meaning "you will do" in Wadi Wadi) is established as an independent accountability mechanism; establish Nyerna Yoorrook Telkuna, that will continue the truth-telling work of the Yoorrook Justice Commission and analyse ongoing impacts of colonisation; establishing Nginma Ngainga Wara (translated as "you will do" from Wadi Wadi language) as a body that will hold the state government to account on its promises to close the gap between Indigenous people and the broader population, it also has the power to conduct hearings and inquiries to ensure accountability from the government.

The treaty establishes or formally recognises three key institutions to oversee the relationship between the state and Indigenous people. It proposes to create a new education facility run by Indigenous peoples, encourage greater use of place names that recognise Indigenous heritage and call for greater uses of Gellung Warl in daily life. The treaty also gives Aboriginal Victorians the power to confirm or deny Aboriginal identity and to manage community infrastructure and cultural programs.

== Other states and territories ==
Although this is the first legislation of its kind in Australia, other states such as New South Wales have planned treaty negotiation processes with their Indigenous peoples. The Australian Capital Territory is consulting with Indigenous peoples about a proposed treaty process.

Other states and territories such as Queensland, Tasmania and the Northern Territory planned to negotiate treaties with Indigenous peoples but these have been cancelled. Tasmania has established truth-telling and healing commissioners but did not proceed with negotiating a treaty. South Australia has planned a treaty negotiation process with their Indigenous peoples, although that process was paused in the lead up to their 2026 state election. Additionally, South Australia has legislated a Voice to Parliament similar to the rejected referendum proposal in 2023. The Western Australian government has stated that they are more focused on settling native titles.

== Reception ==
The opposition Liberal and National coalition has indicated that they do not support any treaty processes and will seek to repeal the legislation if they win the next election due by November 2026. They are instead seeking to create a new advisory body and government department to more effectively manage Indigenous affairs. One Nation has also said they will abolish the Statewide Treaty along with Gellung Warl.

The First Peoples' Assembly of Victoria celebrated the treaty as a victory for self-determination. Co-chairs of the assembly Ngurra Murray and Reuben Berg were present at the assenting ceremony. Berg said "the Treaty we have signed is full of hard fought words. Every single line of the Treaty is imbued with the spirit of our people who have pushed us to do this work". Murray said "this is a promise that our future will be written together. We have honoured our ancestors and paved the way for generations to come." However, independent senator Lidia Thorpe argued that the treaty did not reflect the "free, prior and informed consent" of all 38 language groups in Victoria. Thorpe criticised the model for integrating into "colonial government systems" rather than delivering full sovereign independence.

The conservative think tank Institute of Public Affairs (IPA) said "by seeking to force through this legislation, the Allan government is deliberately creating a new, two-tiered legal system that affords special rights to some Victorians, while paving the way for reparation payments". The Federation of Community Legal Centres and the Victorian Legal Service Board + Commissioner issued statements describing the treaty as a "necessary reset" of the justice system. Nationally, Reconciliation Australia praised the legislation as a precedent for other states, noting that "governments must learn and act on this truth" to close the gap.

The Greens supported the legislation. Greens leader Ellen Sandell described passage of the bill as a "historic moment" that invites all Victorians to walk with First Peoples.

United Nations High Commissioner for Human Rights Volker Türk praised the legislation's enactment while stating that the agreement had the "potential to be truly transformative" and that "it represents a major step towards justice and equality".

=== Future ===
The Dja Dja Wurrung Clans Aboriginal corporation has applied to begin negotiations of a local treaty with the Victorian government. This proposal has been welcomed by minister for treaty and first peoples Natalie Hutchins.

== See also ==
- 2023 Australian Indigenous Voice referendum
- Australian Indigenous advisory bodies
- Indigenous Australian self-determination
- Indigenous treaties in Australia
- Indigenous Voice to Parliament – Proposed advisory body in Australia
- Treaty of Waitangi – 1840 agreement between the British Crown and Māori leaders in New Zealand
- Uluru Statement from the Heart – 2017 Australian Indigenous reform petition
- Yirrkala bark petitions – Aboriginal Australian land claims
