= 2023 Victorian First Peoples' Assembly election =

- 13 May – 3 June 2023

22 seats elected 10 seats appointed
- Registered: 7000+
- Turnout: ~4200 (~60% of enrollment, ~10% of voting age population)

The 2023 First Peoples' Assembly of Victoria election, advertised as the 2023 Treaty election, was held June 2023 to elect 22 members to the First Peoples' Assembly in the Australian state of Victoria. The election filled 22 of 32 seats to the body, which was charged with the responsibility of negotiating a treaty between the state's government and its Aboriginal and Torres Strait Islander population.

Only Aboriginal and Torres Strait Islander people living in Victoria and at least 16 years of age were eligible to enroll to vote in the election — a population around 45,000. Compared to the previous election in 2019, enrollments more than tripled from ~2000 to ~7000. Between the 2019 and 2023 elections, there were two by-elections held to fill vacant seats following resignations.

The election had 75 candidates across 22 regional seats. 10 from the metropolitan region (where most of Victoria's population lives), and three each from the Northwest, Southwest, Northeast and Southeast regions. A further 11 reserved seats were appointed by local Registered Aboriginal Parties within Victoria. 90% of eligible voters did not participate in the election.

Aside from making a treaty with the Victorian Government on behalf of the First Peoples of Victoria, other priorities of the Assembly will be advocating for reform to Victoria's bail laws and raising the age of criminal responsibility in the state.

According to the Assembly's website the body will also take a lead role in administration of the Self Determination Fund provided by the Victorian Government. Up to $200,000 is available to successful applicants to assist in negotiations, what role the Assembly plays in approving and monitoring the distributions is unclear, presumably strong conflict of interest rules will be applied in dispensing taxpayer provided funds.

== Results ==
Of the 22 elected members, 11 were elected for the first time, the remainder were re-elected.

The two outgoing co-chairs, Aunty Geraldine Atkinson (elected North East Area 2019) and Marcus Stewart (appointed not elected in 2019) ) did not re-contest their roles, so new co-chairs were elected. Rueben Berg (appointed) and Ngarra Murray (elected Metro Area, elected to the Metro-Area in 2019) were chosen as new co-chairs. This would be their second term in the Assembly (having been re-elected or appointed in 2023), and first as co-chairs.

Winners of the 2023 election were reported on the Assembly's website.

Election results (number of votes each candidate received) were not published.

=== North West Region ===
- Rodney Carter, Dja Dja Wurrung
- Jacinta Chaplin, Wadi Wadi, Wamba Wamba/Wemba Wemba
- Jason Kelly, Wamba Wamba, Muthi Muthi/Mutti Mutti

=== North East Region ===
- Levi Power, Yorta Yorta
- Belinda Briggs, Yorta Yorta, Wamba Wamba, Wurundjeri and Ngiyampaa
- Nicole Atkinson, Bangerang, Gunditjmara

=== South West Region ===
- Jordan Edwards, Gunditjmara, Waddawurrung, Arrernte
- Michael ‘Mookeye’ Bell, Gunditjmara, Boandik
- Sheree Lowe, Gunditjmara

=== South East Region ===
- Alice Pepper, Gunnai, Yorta Yorta, Mutti Mutti, Gunditjmara, Arrernte
- Peter Hood, Kurnai
- Brian Stevens, Gunai

=== Metro Region ===
- Barry Firebrace-Briggs, Yorta Yorta, Ulupna
- Indi Clarke, Wemba Wemba, Mutti Mutti, Boon Wurrung, Trawlwoolway and Lardil
- Troy Austin, Gunditjmara
- Esme Bamblett, Bangerang, Taungurung, Wiradjuri
- Ngarra Murray, Wamba Wamba, Yorta Yorta, Dhudhuroa, Dja Dja Wurrung (co chair, second term)
- Tracey Evans, Gunditjmara, Bundjalung
- Nerita Waight, Yorta Yorta, Narrandjeri
- Alister Thorpe, Gunai, Yorta Yorta, Gunditjmara
- Uncle Shane Charles, Wurundjeri, Boon Wurrung, Yorta Yorta
- Gary Murray, Dhudhuroa, Yorta Yorta, Barapa Barapa, Dja Dja Wurrung, Wamba Wemba, Wergaia, Wiradjuri

=== Reserved (not directly elected) Seats ===
- Aunty Donna Wright, Gunditjmara
- Djaaran Murray-Jackson, Dja Dja Wurrung, Wamba Wamba, Yorta Yorta, Dhudhuroa, Waywurru, Barapa Barapa, Wergaia, Wiradjuri
- Matthew Burns, Taungurung
- Rueben Berg, Gunditjmara (co-chair, second term)
- Troy McDonald, Gunaikurnai
- Dylan Clarke, Wotjobaluk
- Melissa Jones, Latje Latje, Wotjabaluk
- Zoe Upton, Bunurong, Trawlwoolway
- Uncle Byron Powell, Wadawurrung
- Uncle Andrew Gardiner, Wurundjeri Woi-wurrung

== See also ==
- Indigenous treaties in Australia
- Age of criminal responsibility in Australia
- Indigenous Voice to Parliament
