= United Nations Congress on Crime Prevention and Criminal Justice =

U.N. meeting on criminal justice held every 5 years

- Status: Active
- Genre: Criminal justice
- Frequency: Quinquennially
- Inaugurated: 22 August 1955; 71 years ago
- Most recent: 12–19 April 2015
- Next event: 7–12 March 2021
- Area: Worldwide
- Organizer: Commission on Crime Prevention and Criminal Justice
- Website: www.unodc.org/congress

The United Nations Congress on Crime Prevention and Criminal Justice is a United Nations (UN) sponsored congress on the topics of crime, crime prevention, and criminal justice, held every five years. It is organized by the United Nations Office on Drugs and Crime (UNODC). Participants of the Congress include UN Member States and Observers, international organizations, non-governmental organization and individual experts.

The Commission on Crime Prevention and Criminal Justice acts as an agenda item of the upcoming Crime Congress and to make action-oriented recommendations to serve as a basis for the draft recommendations and conclusions for consideration by the Congress.

The event was initially held in 1955, following the United Nations General Assembly's dissolution of the International Penal and Penitentiary Commission (IPPC) in 1950. Initially called the United Nations Congress on the Prevention of Crime and the Treatment of Offenders, the current name was adopted in 2005.

The antecedents of the Congress on Crime Prevention and Criminal Justice include the First International Congress on the Prevention and Repression of Crime, held in London in 1872.

== List of Congresses ==
Congress	Year	Host city	Focus	Notes
1st Congress	1955	Geneva, Switzerland	"Open" penal and correctional facilities; The selection and training of prison personnel; The proper use of prison labor; The impact of mass media on juvenile deviance	Adopted the Standard Minimum Rules for the Treatment of Prisoners
2nd Congress	1960	London, United Kingdom	Short-term imprisonment; The integration of prison labor with national economies; The remuneration of prisoners; Pre-release treatment and assistance to dependents of prisoners; Parole and released prisoners' transition to community life; After care, including vocational guidance, training and placement; The role of national planning in preventing crime	
3rd Congress	1965	Stockholm, Sweden	Social change and criminality; Social forces and the prevention of criminality; Community action for preventing crime; Special preventative and treatment measures for juveniles and young adults; Measures to reduce recidivism	
4th Congress	1970	Kyoto, Japan	Social defense policies in relation to development planning; Public participation in crime prevention and control of crime and delinquency; The organization of research for policy development in social defense; Developments in the correctional field	
5th Congress	1975	Geneva, Switzerland	Offenses involving works of art and other cultural property; Criminality associated with alcoholism and drug use; Interpersonal violence; Criminality associated with migration and flight from natural disasters and hostilities; Female criminality; Terrorism	Adopted the Declaration on the Protection of All Persons from Being Subjected to Torture and Other Cruel, Inhuman or Degrading Treatment or Punishment
6th Congress	1980	Caracas, Venezuela	Crime trends and crime prevention strategies; Improvement of crime statistics; Development of minimum standards of juvenile justice; Measures to put an end to torture and extra-legal executions; De-institutionalization of corrections and community measures; Specific needs of women prisoners	
7th Congress	1985	Milan, Italy		Adopted: United Nations Standard Minimum Rules for the Administration of Juvenile Justice; Declaration of Basic Principles of Justice for Victims of Crime and Abuse of Power; Basic Principles on the Independence of the Judiciary; Model Agreement on the Transfer of Foreign Prisoners; Milan Plan of Action
8th Congress	1990	Havana, Cuba		Adopted: Model treaties on: extradition, mutual legal assistance, transfer of proceedings in criminal matters and transfer of supervision of offenders conditionally sentenced or conditionally released; Basic Principles for the Treatment of Prisoners; United Nations Guidelines for the Prevention of Juvenile Delinquency; United Nations Rules for the Protection of Juveniles Deprived of their Liberty; Basic Principles on the Use of Force and Firearms by Law Enforcement Officials; United Nations Guidelines on the Role of Prosecutors; Basic Principles on the Role of Lawyers; United Nations Standard Minimum Rules for Non-custodial Measures
9th Congress	1995	Cairo, Egypt	Action against transnational and organized crime; The role of criminal law in the protection of the environment; Criminal justice and police systems; Crime prevention strategies in urban areas; Youth crime	
10th Congress	2000	Vienna, Austria	The rule of law and the strengthening of the criminal justice system; International cooperation in combating transnational organized crime; Effective crime prevention; Combating corruption; Crimes relating to the computer network; Community involvement in crime prevention; Women in the criminal justice system	Adopted the Vienna Declaration on Crime and Justice: Meeting the Challenges of the Twenty-first Century
11th Congress	2005	Bangkok, Thailand	Effective measures to combat transnational organized crime; Economic and financial crime: challenges to sustainable development; Corruptions: threats and trends in the twenty-first century; International cooperation against terrorism and links between terrorism and other criminal activities; Standard-setting in crime prevention and criminal justice	Adopted the Bangkok Declaration on Synergies and Responses: Strategic Alliances in Crime Prevention and Criminal Justice
12th Congress	2010	Salvador, Brazil	Education for Justice; Judicial Integrity; Prisoner Rehabilitation; Crime Prevention through Sports	
13th Congress	2015	Doha, Qatar	Children, youth and crime; Migrant smuggling; Human trafficking; Money-laundering; Cybercrime	Adopted the Doha Declaration on Integrating Crime Prevention and Criminal Justice into the Wider United Nations Agenda to Address Social and Economic Challenges and to Promote the Rule of Law at the National and International Levels, and Public Participation
14th Congress	2021	Kyoto, Japan	Overall theme: "Advancing crime prevention, criminal justice and the rule of law: towards the achievement of the 2030 Agenda": Evidence-based crime prevention: statistics, indicators and evaluation in support of successful practices; Reducing reoffending: identifying risks and developing solutions; Education and youth engagement as key to making societies resilient to crime; Current crime trends, recent developments and emerging solutions, in particular new technologies as means for and tools against crime	Postponed by the General Assembly due to concerns surrounding the COVID-19 pandemic.
15th Congress	2026	Abu Dhabi, United Arab Emirates		It was scheduled to be held in Abu Dhabi, but was postponed due to the 2026 Iran war.
