= Jock Austin =

Personal information
- Full name: Herbert George Austin
- Nickname: Jock
- Born: 16 March 1938; Framlingham, Victoria
- Died: 3 May 1990 (aged 52)

Coaching career
Years	Club	Games (W–L–D)
1980s	Fitzroy Stars	

Herbert George "Jock" Austin (16 March 1938 − 3 May 1990) was an Indigenous Australian community leader. He was a Gunditjmara man who served as the coach and president of the Fitzroy Stars Football Club in its early years.

== Biography ==
Austin was born in 1938 under a gumtree at Framlingham Aboriginal Reserve as the son of Ella Clark and Cyril Austin. He had eleven siblings.

He moved to the inner-Melbourne suburb of Fitzroy in the 1950s where met Patricia Prior, whom he raised two children with. He participated in Australian rules football and boxing, while also working as a boilermaker and having a job laying tramway track.

Austin founded the Melbourne Aboriginal Youth Sport and Recreation Co-operative (MAYSAR), an Aboriginal youth sport centre and boxing gym, in 1982.

In the 1970s, Austin became associated with the newly-formed Fitzroy Stars Football Club, a football club run by Indigenous Australians. He introduced the club's first junior team in 1978. After the Northern Metropolitan Football League – which the Stars were competing in, disbanded in 1980 – Austin was a driving force in the club staying afloat.

When the YCW Football League (YCWFL) folded in 1986, the Stars applied for entry in 36 local competitions, but received rejections from every single one. As a result, Austin (who was also serving as club administrator) formed the Melbourne North Football League (MNFL) in 1989.

Austin's son, Troy Austin, is also a former Fitzroy Stars president and currently serves as a member of the First Peoples' Assembly of Victoria after being elected in 2023.
