= Ajda Asgari =

Swedish politician

Member of the Riksdag
- Incumbent
- Assumed office 28 September 2026
- Constituency: Stockholm County

Personal details
- Born: 1989 (age 36–37) Stockholm, Sweden
- Party: Green

Ajda Asgari (born 1989) is a Swedish politician for the Green Party. She has been a member of the Swedish Parliament since 2026, elected for the Stockholm County constituency.

== Biography ==
Asgari was born to Iranian parents who fled the Iranian Revolution. She grew up in Tyresö Municipality and worked as a teacher at Stimmet's school in Tyresö. She has been politically active for the Green Party since 2008.

In the 2018 Swedish local elections, Asgari was the Green Party's top candidate in Tyresö. After the election, the Social Democrats, the Liberals, and the Green Party formed a cross-bloc government in the municipality, where Asgari became chairman of the labor market and social affairs committee.

Asgari was elected to the Green Party's party board in 2021 and re-elected in 2023.

Ahead of the 2022 Swedish general election, Asgari was in sixth place on the Green Party's parliamentary list in Stockholm County and was also a candidate for Stockholm Region. In the 2026 Swedish general election, Asgari was elected to the Riksdag for Stockholm County. She took office as a member of parliament on 28 September 2026.

== Political positions ==
In the SVT election compass for the 2026 parliamentary election, Asgari described herself as somewhat to the left on the political right-left scale, stating that reducing economic inequality and reducing emissions were her central political goals.

In the election compass, Asgari took a position, among other things, for higher climate ambitions, increased government investment in green industry, more affordable rental apartments, the abolition of the qualifying deduction and shorter weekly working hours. She opposed, among other things, reduced taxes on gasoline and diesel, market rents and a lowered age of criminal responsibility. She also stated that Sweden should pursue a more open asylum policy and that more countries should recognize Palestine as a state.

== See also ==
- List of members of the Riksdag, 2026–2030
