= Yoorrook Justice Commission =

Truth and justice commission in Victoria, Australia

Truth and justice commission overview
- Formed: 12 May 2021
- Dissolved: 30 June 2025
- Jurisdiction: Victoria
- Website: yoorrook.org.au

The Yoorrook Justice Commission was a truth and justice commission established in Victoria, Australia. The Victorian Government committed to the inquiry in July 2020, and it was formally established via Letters Patent in May 2021. This made Victoria the first state or territory to commit to a process to "formally recognise historic wrongs – and address ongoing injustices" for Aboriginal people.

The commission established an official public record of the experience of Aboriginal Victorians since the start of British colonisation.

== Objectives ==
The commission's Letters Patent outlined several objectives. It sought to develop a shared understanding among Victorians regarding the impact of colonisation and the resilience of First Peoples' cultures. The inquiry investigated the causes and consequences of systemic injustice, including the role of state laws and policies, to determine which state or non-state entities bore responsibility for harm suffered by First Peoples.

The commission also identified current systemic injustices. Its findings were intended to support the treaty-making process.

== Process and hearings ==
The Commission accepted submissions (nuther-mooyoop) in various forms, including written, audio, or video submissions, or as objects such as artwork. Public hearings were known as wurrek tyerrang.

Uncle Jack Charles was the first Indigenous elder to speak about his experiences at the first set of public hearings on 26 April 2022. A second block of hearings was held in late May 2022. Elders were invited to speak about their direct experiences and perspectives based on their preparedness to tell their truths in a public setting.

== Reports and findings ==
The Commission released several interim reports during its operation, culminating in its final reports in mid-2025.

=== Yoorrook for Justice (2023) ===
In May 2023, the Victorian Government admitted to the commission that it had failed to properly monitor initiatives intended to help First Peoples, and conceded that its 2018 bail reforms had contributed to the incarceration of Indigenous people.

The commission released the Yoorrook for Justice report in September 2023. It proposed 46 recommendations to reform the child protection and criminal justice systems. The report found that Aboriginal children were 21 times more likely to be in out-of-home care in Victoria than non-Aboriginal children. Additionally, the rate of Aboriginal men on remand had grown by nearly 600% over the previous ten years.

Recommendations included raising the age of criminal responsibility from 10 to 14 years of age. Victoria Police welcomed the report, and the Chief Justice of Victoria, Anne Ferguson, stated that changes might be made after considering the report.

=== Final Report (2025) ===
The Commission's final report, Yoorrook Truth be Told, was tabled in the Victorian Parliament on 1 July 2025. It was accompanied by the commission's five-volume third interim report, Yoorrook for Transformation, which contained 100 recommendations for reform and redress to inform Victoria's treaty negotiations.

== Commissioners ==
The commissioners who oversaw the inquiry were:

- Eleanor Bourke, chair (Wergaia/Wamba Wamba Elder)
- Sue-Anne Hunter (Wurundjeri and Ngurai Illum Wurrung woman)
- Travis Lovett (Kerrupmara/Gunditjmara man)
- Maggie Walter (Palawa woman)
- Anthony North KC

=== Previous commissioners ===
- Kevin Bell (non-Indigenous)
- Wayne Atkinson (Yorta Yorta-Dja Dja Wurrung Elder)

== See also ==
- Treaty (Victoria)
- First Peoples' Assembly of Victoria
