= Indigenous treaties in Australia =

Hypothetical government treaties with Indigenous Australians

Indigenous treaties in Australia are proposed binding legal agreements between Australian governments and Australian First Nations (or other similar groups). A treaty could (amongst other things) recognise First Nations as distinct political communities, acknowledge Indigenous Sovereignty, set out mutually recognised rights and responsibilities or provide for some degree of self-government. As of 2025, Victoria is the only jurisdiction to establish a treaty, with the Commonwealth and all other states except Western Australia having previously expressed support for a treaty process. However, the defeat of the Voice referendum in 2023 has led to a reversal by several state branches of the Liberal and National parties in their support for treaty and a much more ambiguous expressed position by state branches of the Labor Party as well as Labor governments.

Moves to state and territory treaties were boosted by the Victorian government's establishment of a legal framework for negotiations to progress, announced in 2016, and with the election of the First Peoples' Assembly of Victoria in 2019. Support shown for Indigenous issues by the June 2020 Black Lives Matter rallies across Australia also increased support for treaty processes. However, following the failure of the 2023 Australian Indigenous Voice referendum, progress towards treaties has either stalled or been reversed in the states and territories apart from Victoria.

== Background ==
The objects of treaties between governments and Indigenous peoples may include:

- provision of practical rights and compensation
- initiation of a formal process of reconciliation between the group and government relating to past grievances
- providing a framework for some type of self-determination for individual peoples or groups

Research by the Harvard Project on American Indian Economic Development shows that self-determination is an essential component in redressing entrenched disadvantage.

Many Aboriginal Australians have said that a treaty or treaties would bring them real as well as symbolic recognition, and national debate has occurred for many years on the topic, alongside related matters such as Indigenous recognition in the Australian Constitution, land rights, and programs aimed at reducing disadvantage such as Closing the Gap. This type of treaty would involve a formal agreement which defines the relationship between government and First Nations peoples, and could include binding contracts on specific issues as well as practical measures relating to health and education.

British colonial representatives negotiated treaties with Indigenous peoples in New Zealand and in Canada during early phases of settlement. The Treaty of Waitangi was concluded in 1840 at time when the future Colony of New Zealand was then part of the Colony of New South Wales. British treaty-making in North America began as early as sixteenth century and continued until Canada gained self-government in 1867, after which time the Canadian federal government entered into the Numbered Treaties (1871 to 1921). Colonial treaties also featured in African history: a chief of Bonny (in present-day Nigeria) in 1860 explained that he refused a British treaty due to the tendency to "induce the Chiefs to sign a treaty whose meaning they did not understand, and then seize upon the country".

== History ==
Indigenous treaties have been discussed since the early years of the Australian colonies. In 1832 the Governor of Van Diemen's Land (now Tasmania), George Arthur remarked in the aftermath of the Black War in the colony that it was "a fatal error ... that a treaty was not entered into with the natives". He recommended to the Colonial Office that, before the colonisation of South Australia, an understanding be reached with the Aboriginal peoples there, in a bid "to prevent a long-continued warfare". Notably, the Letters Patent establishing the Province of South Australia of 1836 (unlike the South Australia Act 1834, which it amended) included recognition of the rights of the Aboriginal peoples of South Australia, creating the first negotiation between Aboriginal peoples and Europeans.

The only pre-21st century attempt to negotiate a treaty with Indigenous Australians was what came to be known as Batman's Treaty. This was an agreement between John Batman, a pastoralist and businessman, and a group of Wurundjeri elders, for the purchase of land around Port Phillip, near the present site of Melbourne The so-called treaty was declared void on 26 August 1835 by the Governor of New South Wales, Richard Bourke, which declared that all land within the colony belonged to the Crown and that it had the sole authority to dispose of it. While the Crown retains the right to dispose of any land under the doctrine of radical title, some inherent Indigenous rights to land have been recognised under native title law.

An Indigenous treaty was first promised by Prime Minister Bob Hawke in 1988 after receiving the Barunga Statement from Aboriginal elders, which called for such a treaty to be concluded. Despite public interest and growing support, concerns were raised over possible implications of such a treaty, such as financial compensation.

=== 21st century ===
In 2017, Prime Minister Malcolm Turnbull rejected the proposal for an Indigenous voice to parliament, it being the first request of the Uluru Statement from the Heart, which also included a request for treaty.

With no progress made towards an Indigenous treaty at federal level despite decades of debate, in the early 21st century a number of states and territories began treaty negotiations with their Indigenous peoples. The 2017 Uluru Statement from the Heart included the request: "We seek a Makarrata Commission to supervise a process of agreement-making between governments and First Nations and truth-telling about our history" (Makarrata being a Yolngu word for "a process of conflict resolution, peacemaking and justice").

In July 2019, Ken Wyatt, recently appointed to the new role of Minister for Indigenous Australians, gave an address to the National Press Club, in which he spoke of the theme of NAIDOC Week 2019: "Voice. Treaty. Truth." He spoke of the development of a local, regional and national voice, and said "with respect to Treaty, it's important that states and territory jurisdictions take the lead. When you consider the constitution, they are better placed to undertake that work".

With the Victorian government's creation of a legal framework for Indigenous treaty negotiations in 2018 with their First Peoples' Assembly, the debate rose to prominence across Australia again, with impetus added by the June 2020 Black Lives Matter rallies across Australia. In October 2025, Victoria became the first Australian state to pass a treaty.

== State and territory treaty processes ==
The Victorian government of Daniel Andrews was the first at state level to pass a legal framework for Indigenous treaty negotiations, in 2018, but there have been various moves made to instigate such a process in all states and territories in the 21st century.

Issues covered by an Indigenous treaty with a state government are likely to include health and education.

=== New South Wales ===
The New South Wales Labor party committed to funding and beginning treaty discussion as an election promise prior to winning government in March 2023. David Harris has been appointed as minister for Aboriginal Affairs and Treaty. However, legal academic Harry Hobbs has stated that he believes the government has become much more vaguer and uncommitted when talking about treaty, having become apprehensive following the failure of the Voice referendum. Three treaty commissioners have been appointed, to consult with Aboriginal New South Welshmen about their thoughts around treaty. A government website states the process "is likely to begin in early 2025".

=== Victoria ===
The Victorian Government was the first at state level to pass a legal framework for Indigenous treaty negotiations, in 2018. In 2018, The Victorian Liberal Party opposed a state-based Indigenous treaty, stating that a federal treaty would be more appropriate. Opposition politician Bernie Finn also stated that since Aboriginal Victorians were Victorian citizens, the state would be making an Indigenous treaty with itself, an argument rejected by the government. By 2022 the Victorian Liberal Party supported treaty.

On 3 July 2018, the government passed the first Australian treaty law, the Advancing the Treaty Process with Aboriginal Victorians Act 2018, effective 1 August 2018. The ultimate goal of a partnership between the Victorian government and Aboriginal communities "is to achieve reconciliation and justice for Aboriginal communities", and the Act enshrines such a partnership in law.

The 2019 Victorian First Peoples' Assembly election was held to choose the representatives for Aboriginal and Torres Strait Islander people in Victoria. only 7% of the eligible voters turned out to vote.

On 16 August 2022, the Legislative Council voted 31 votes to three for the Treaty Authority and Other Treaty Elements Bill 2022. The three who voted against the bill were the two Liberal Democrats Tim Quilty and David Limbrick and former Liberal turned Democratic Labour Bernie Finn.

On 21 January 2024, the Victorian Liberal and National opposition announced that they would be withdrawing its support for treaty, reversing their previous support for the proposal.

On 9 September 2025, Premier Jacinta Allan introduced a bill in the Legislative Assembly, the Statewide Treaty Bill 2025, to enact and implement the treaty, as well as making the First Peoples' Assembly a permanent authority under an umbrella body known as Gellung Warl. The body would include an independent accountability mechanism, as required by the National Agreement on Closing the Gap. The bill passed the Legislative Council on 30 October 2025, with 21 votes to 16. Labor, the Greens, Animal Justice Party and Legalise Cannabis Victoria voted yes while the Coalition, Shooters, Fishers and Farmers, Libertarian party and One Nation voted against.

The Coalition has vowed to repeal the treaty within 100 days of government if it wins the 2026 Victorian state election.

=== Queensland ===
In 2019 the Queensland government of Annastacia Palaszczuk announced its interest in pursuing a pathway to an Indigenous treaty process. The Treaty Working Group and Eminent Treaty Process Panel were set up, with Jackie Huggins and Michael Lavarch co-chairing the Eminent Panel. Their Path to Treaty Report was tabled in Queensland Parliament in February 2020 after they had consulted widely, across more than 1,700 Queenslanders and 24 communities between July 2019 and early 2020, and presented to Deputy Premier, Treasurer and Minister for Aboriginal and Torres Strait Islander Partnerships Jackie Trad. Huggins said that a process of truth-telling, acknowledging the history of Australia, is a "vital component to moving on".

On 13 August 2020, Premier Palaszczuk announced that the government would be supporting the recommendation to move forward on a Path to Treaty with First Nations Queenslanders. She said that the Treaty Advancement Committee would provide independent advice on the implementation of the panel's recommendations.

In 2023 the Queensland Parliament passed the Path to Treaty Act 2023 (Qld), which established the First Nations Treaty Institute, an independent statutory body to assist First Nations prepare for the upcoming treaty process. The act also created the Truth-telling and Healing Inquiry, to record and report on the impact of colonisation on Indigenous Queenslanders. The bill passed with bipartisan support. The only 4 who voted against it, were the MPs from the Katter's Australian Party and One Nation who voted to reject it.

On 19 October 2023, a few days after the 2023 Australian Indigenous Voice referendum the opposition Liberal National Party of Queensland (LNP) leader David Crisafulli announced that they would be withdrawing its support for treaty, reversing their previous support for the proposal.

The opposition Liberal National Party of Queensland (LNP) won the 2024 Queensland state election and repealed the Path to Treaty Act 2023 while also directing that the Truth-telling and Healing Inquiry end.

=== Western Australia ===
As of January 2024, Western Australia is the only jurisdiction without a formal treaty process ongoing. However, in 2015 the Western Australian Government of Colin Barnett signed a $1.3 billion native title settlement with the Noongar people, which was described by deputy opposition leader Roger Cook as "a classic treaty", and Ken Wyatt called it "a treaty in the true sense".

The comprehensive South West Native Title Settlement aims to resolve native title claims in exchange for statutory recognition of the Noongar people as the traditional owners of South-Western Australia. As of 2020 it is the largest native title settlement in Australian history, affecting about 30,000 Noongar People and encompassing around 200,000 km^{2} (77,000 sq mi) in south-western Western Australia. It has been described as "Australia's first treaty" by legal academics Harry Hobbs and George Williams. Hobbs later described these agreements as a "small 't' treaties" as while not negotiated though a formal treaty process, many of the outcomes are similar to those that would result from that process.

By 2018, WA had announced plans to establish an Aboriginal representative body in the state.

=== South Australia ===
In 2016 the South Australian government of Jay Weatherill announced it intended to negotiate up to 40 treaties with Indigenous groups across the state, and that $4.4 million would be set aside over five years for the purpose. In December 2016, talks began between the government and three Aboriginal nations: the Ngarrindjeri, Narungga, and Adnyamathanha peoples. Following the July 2017 report of the South Australian Treaty Commissioner, negotiations began. In February 2018, the Buthera Agreement was signed with the Narungga nation, of the Yorke Peninsula.

Following the Weatherill government's defeat in the 2018 state election, incoming premier Steven Marshall paused the treaty negotiation process begun by Weatherill, stating he wanted to focus on "practical outcomes".

In 2022 a Labor government was returned to office, with Premier Peter Malinauskas committing to restart the treaty process. Under Malinauskas, who appointed Kyam Maher as Minister for Aboriginal Affairs and Attorney-General of South Australia, SA became the first state in the country to legislate a state-based Voice to Parliament in 2023. In late May 2025, South Australian Aboriginal leaders, including Melissa Clarke, one of the signatories to the Uluru Statement, called on the government to restart the process; however, Maher said that while the government was still committed to restarting negotiations, it was unlikely to get any agreements signed before the next election, nine months away. He said that he was considering the model adopted by Victoria, as well as others in Canada and New Zealand.

=== Tasmania ===
On Australia Day in 2015, the Tasmanian Greens called for a formal treaty to be negotiated between the Tasmanian Government and the Tasmanian Aboriginal community. Michael Mansell, chair of the Aboriginal Land Council of Tasmania, said in August 2019 that non-Indigenous people need not fear a treaty, as it would "simply be an expression of true democracy and self-determination". At that point, only 300 km^{2} (120 sq mi) of the 67,000 km^{2} (26,000 sq mi) of Tasmania had been returned under the Aboriginal Lands Act 1995 (Tas). He said that returning a few key areas of uninhabited wilderness which was now Crown land would mean jobs for Aboriginal people.

In June 2020, Mansell and Greg Brown, Tasmanian Aboriginal Corporation board member, had their first meeting with Premier Peter Gutwein, and raised the matter of a treaty. Mansell had been heartened by the support shown for Aboriginal issues across Australia in the Black Lives Matter protests sparked by the death of US man George Floyd, and spoke at the Launceston rally of the need for a Treaty Commission.

In 2021, Premier Peter Gutwein announced the beginning of a treaty and truth telling process, beginning with consultations with the State's Aboriginal population. An Aboriginal Advisory Group held its first meeting in February 2023. However, certain Indigenous groups have described their distrust of the government and have alleged that the government 'only willing to listen to six people as part of their government-selected group'. The issue of deciding who should be counted as Aboriginal for the purpose of treaty negotiation is yet to be decided, with many Aboriginal people expressing anger and frustration with what they believe are a greater number of people falsely claiming Aboriginal status and what they believe is government encouragement of this practice. The treaty process was abandoned by the government in May 2025.

=== Northern Territory ===
In 2018 the Northern Territory Government of Michael Gunner pledged to undertake a treaty process with Indigenous peoples of the Territory, including the appointment of an Independent Treaty Commissioner to oversee negotiations. In June 2018 Gunner signed the "Barunga agreement", a memorandum of understanding committing his Government to negotiate with the Territory's four Aboriginal land councils over the next three years to develop a treaty process.

The process will be overseen by an independent treaty commissioner, who in the first stage will undertake consultations for one year with the Indigenous communities to gauge their interest in a treaty. In the second stage, a public discussion paper will be released, translated into major Aboriginal languages for consultation and feedback. A final report will then be tabled in the Northern Territory Legislative Assembly within 18 months of stage one's completion.

On 4 March 2019, Mick Dodson was appointed Treaty Commissioner, agreed by all four NT land councils and the Minister. He was tasked with presenting a final report within 2.5 years. The Treaty Commission, in a discussion paper published in July 2020, has said: "Some of our Elders are very old... the process of truth-telling must begin as soon as possible. It is urgent". Truth-telling is an essential step, and must take place before the negotiations for treaty get under way, which can take a long time. Because the NT is not a state, treaties negotiated with the NT Government could be overruled by the Federal Government, thereby limiting their effectiveness. There are also challenges in cases where traditional owners' lands extend across state borders, and where members and descendants of the Stolen Generations have not been able to find who their people are and therefore may not qualify as First Nations people. The Treaty Commissioner would be handing his report to the Chief Minister in 2022, after which negotiations would begin.

In 2023, the Commission was abolished, with the Territory government arguing that further time and consultation was needed before moving forward on treaty. The government denied that it was no longer acting on treaty issues, with directly government treaty symposia held in April 2024.

The NT opposition Country Liberal Party (CLP) ended the treaty process after winning government in 2024.

== See also ==
- Aboriginal land rights in Australia
- History of Indigenous Australians
- Letters Patent establishing the Province of South Australia
- Native title in Australia
- Treaty rights
- Agreements, Treaties and Negotiated Settlements
