= Beijing Rules =

United Nations General Assembly resolution adopted in 1985

The United Nations Standard Minimum Rules for the Administration of Juvenile Justice, often referred to as the Beijing Rules, is a resolution of the United Nations General Assembly regarding the treatment of juvenile prisoners and offenders in member nations.

== History ==
In September 1980, the United Nations held its Sixth United Nations Congress on the Prevention of Crime and the Treatment of Offenders in Caracas, Venezuela. The UN had previously declared 1980 the "Year of the Child".

Dahn Batchelor, who holds a certificate in criminology and participant at that Congress, presented a paper about the need for a bill of rights for young offenders. The United States delegation supported the paper. Much drafting of the policy took place at a conference in Beijing, China. It was originally proposed as a Bill of Rights for Young Offenders, but was eventually renamed the United Nations Standard Minimum Rules on the Administration of Juvenile Justice.

The proposed draft was then discussed at length at the United Nations Seventh Congress on the Prevention of Crime and the Treatment of Offenders in Milan, Italy, in September 1985.

It was adopted on 29 November 1985 by the United Nations General Assembly.

== See also ==
- United Nations Standard Minimum Rules
- Convention on the Rights of the Child
- Defense of infancy
