= 2019 Victorian First Peoples' Assembly election =

- 16 September – 20 October 2019

21 seats elected 11 seats appointed
- Registered: ~30,000
- Turnout: ~2000 (7.0%)

The 2019 Victorian First Peoples' Assembly election was held between 16 September to 20 October 2019 to elect 21 members to the First Peoples' Assembly in the Australian state of Victoria. The election filled seats to the body, which was charged with the responsibility of preparing for negotiations with the Victorian Government about a treaty with the state's Aboriginal population.

Only Aboriginal and Torres Strait Islander people living in Victoria and at least 16 years of age were eligible to vote in the election. However, only 7% of the eligible voters turned out to vote.

== Background ==
In June 2018 the Victorian Parliament passed legislation to create a framework for negotiating a treaty with Aboriginal people. The legislation was supported by the Labor Government and the Greens, though not by the two opposition parties, the Liberal and National parties. The legislation included provisions to create an Aboriginal representative body and its implementation was overseen by the Victorian Treaty Advancement Commission chaired by Jill Gallagher. The lead-up to the vote was not without controversy, as it occurred amidst the Andrews Labor Government's planned duplication of the Western Highway near Ararat. The duplication plans included a proposal to disrupt a cultural site with trees sacred to Aboriginal people in the area. A protest on the steps of Parliament House included protesters with signs saying "no trees, no treaty".

== Assembly ==
The Assembly was filled by 32 representatives, the majority of which were elected in five regions; 9 from Melbourne region, 3 from Western Victoria region, 3 from North-Western region, 3 from Northern region, and 3 from Eastern region. A further 11 seats were reserved for formally recognised Traditional Owner Groups. 73 people nominated for the Assembly and approximately 30,000 people were eligible to vote. To vote, eligible voters were first required to enrol online and provide evidence of identity, age and residence. Voting opened on 16 September and closed on 20 October 2019, and voters could cast a ballot online, by post or at one of 43 polling booths across Victoria.

Once elected, the Assembly was not responsible for negotiating a treaty or multiple treaties with the Victorian government on behalf of Aboriginal clans and nations. Instead the Assembly's primary responsibilities were to:

- Establish the Treaty Authority – an independent umpire in the negotiation process
- Establish the Treaty Negotiating Framework – a body who set the ground rules for negotiations and authorised who may negotiate on behalf of certain people/clans
- Establish the Self-Determination Fund – to support Aboriginal communities to be on an even playing field with government when treaties are being negotiated

== Results ==
The 21 elected candidates were announced on 4 November 2019. Seven days later the commission announced the 11 people appointed by formally recognised Traditional Owner groups (termed Registered Aboriginal Parties or Traditional Owner Corporations) to a reserved seat on the Assembly.

The first meeting of the Assembly took place on 10 December 2019 at Parliament House, Melbourne.

Elected members

Metropolitan	South west	North west	North east	South east
Esmerelda Glenda Bamblett	Sissy Austin	Jacinta Chaplin	Geraldine Atkinson	Peter Hood
Muriel Pauline Bamblett AO	Michael (Mookeye) Bell	Raylene Ivy Harradine (Note: Outgoing member.)	Natarsha Bamblett	Alice Ann Pepper
Rueben Berg	Jordan Edwards	Jason Kelly	Leanne Miller	Kaylene Williamson
Carolyn Briggs AM
Matthew Burns
Tracey Evans
Trevor John Gallagher
Ngarra Murray
Alister Thorpe

Reserved seat holders

One seat unfilled, because the Yorta Yorta Nation Aboriginal Corporation were entitled to appoint a member but did not do so. Seat holders may have ancestry from multiple First Nations.

Name	Nation (clan)	Region	Registered Aboriginal Party
Dylan Clarke	Wotjobaluk	North West	Barengi Gadjin Land Council Aboriginal Corporation
Trent Nelson	Dja Dja Wurrung, Yorta Yorta	North West	Dja Dja Wurrung Clans Aboriginal Corporation
Sean Fagan	Wadawurrung		Wadawurrung Traditional Owners Aboriginal Corporation
Marcus Stewart	Taungurung		Taungurung Land and Waters Council Aboriginal Corporation
Donna Wright	Gunditjmara (Kerrupmara), Kamilaroi	South West	Eastern Maar Aboriginal Corporation
Melissa Jones	Latje Latje, Wotjobaluk	North West	First People of the Millewa-Mallee Aboriginal Corporation
Jamie Lowe	Gunditjmara		Gunditj Mirring Traditional Owners Aboriginal Corporation
Robert Ogden (Note: Seat now held by Shane Clarke from September 2022.)	Bunurong	Metropolitan	Bunurong Land Council Aboriginal Corporation
Andrew Gardiner	Wurundjeri, Woi Wurung		Wurundjeri Woi Wurrung Cultural Heritage Aboriginal Corporation
Troy McDonald	Gunai Kurnai	South East	Gunaikurnai Land and Waters Aboriginal Corporation
Unfilled	-	-	Yorta Yorta Nation Aboriginal Corporation

== By-elections ==
Two by-elections were held for the assembly before the 2023 election.

Region	Vacated	Previous member	Elected member	Elected	Cause
South West	28 October 2020	Sissy Austin	Charmaine Clarke	June 2021	Resigned after removal of sacred tree
North East	Late 2021	Natarsha Bamblett	Travis Morgan	17 April 2022	Resigned

== See also ==
- Indigenous treaties in Australia
