= United Nations Standard Minimum Rules =

The United Nations has adopted sets of Standard Minimum Rules addressing the following topics:

- Standard Minimum Rules for the Treatment of Prisoners (the "Mandela Rules"), 30 August 1955
- Standard Minimum Rules for the Administration of Juvenile Justice (the "Beijing Rules"), 29 November 1985
- Standard Minimum Rules for Non-custodial Measures (the "Tokyo Rules"), 14 December 1990
- United Nations Rules for the Treatment of Women Prisoners and Non-custodial Measures for Women Offenders (the "Bangkok Rules"), 22 December 2010
