= Indigenous Australian self-determination =

Self-governance by Aboriginal peoples

Indigenous Australian self-determination, also known as Aboriginal Australian self-determination, is the ability of Aboriginal and Torres Strait Islander peoples to determine their own political status and pursue their own economic, social and cultural interests. Self-determination asserts that Aboriginal and Torres Strait Islander peoples should direct and implement Aboriginal and Torres Strait Islander policy formulation and provision of services. Self-determination encompasses both Aboriginal land rights and self-governance, and may also be supported by a treaty between a government and an Indigenous group in Australia.

From the 1970s to 1990s, the Australian government supported Aboriginal groups moving from large settlements in remote areas back to outstation communities in formerly traditional lands. Also from the early 1970s, Aboriginal communities began running their own health services, legal services, and housing cooperatives.

== 1960s-70s ==
During this period, the Whitlam government changed Australian Indigenous policy significantly by moving away from cultural assimilation and towards self-determination.

=== Federal Council for the Advancement of Aborigines and Torres Strait Islanders ===
The Federal Council for the Advancement of Aborigines and Torres Strait Islanders was founded in 1957 as a non-governmental organization to advance Aboriginal rights, composed of various member organisations.

=== Department of Aboriginal Affairs ===
The Department of Aboriginal Affairs was founded by the Whitlam government to replace the government agencies responsible for Indigenous affairs, the Council for Aboriginal Affairs, and the Office of Aboriginal Affairs, while also providing a route for self-determination by employing Indigenous Australians.

=== National Aboriginal Consultative Committee ===
The National Aboriginal Consultative Committee (NACC) was the first elected body representing Indigenous Australians on the national level, having been established by the Whitlam government in 1972. It was composed of 36 representatives elected by Aboriginal people in 36 regions of Australia. In 1983, the elections reached a turnout of approximately 78%. However, the organisation was marred by friction with the Department of Aboriginal Affairs, while internally lacking coherence.

=== National Aboriginal Conference ===
Following a review in 1976, the NACC was abolished by the new Fraser government in 1977. To replace it, the National Aboriginal Conference (NAC) was founded.

== 1980s-90s ==
=== Aboriginal and Torres Strait Islander Commission (ATSIC) ===
Following the election of the Hawke government in 1983, two reports were commissioned into a replacement of the NAC. The O'Donoghue report argued that the NAC did not effectively represent its constituents or advocate specific policies. The Coombs report made the case for an organisation with representation of regions and existing indigenous organisations.

To respond to these recommendations, the Aboriginal and Torres Strait Islander Commission was founded in 1989.

Following allegations of corruption, it was abolished by the Howard government in 2004.

=== Aboriginal Provisional Government ===
The Aboriginal Provisional Government has campaigned for Aboriginal sovereignty in Australia, and is headed by an Elders Council. It also issues Aboriginal passports.

== 2000 – current ==
The dissolution of ATSIC in 2004 was seen by some as an end to self-determination as a policy. Nevertheless, calls for it have continued among Indigenous Australians.

=== Uluru Statement ===
The Uluru Statement from the Heart was a call for a "First Nations Voice" and a "Makarrata Commission" to drive "agreement-making" and "truth-telling", made by a First Nations National Constitutional Convention in 2017. This suggestion was refused by the Turnbull government.

=== Victorian First Peoples' Assembly ===
In 2018 the state of Victoria passed legislation which established the legal framework for an Aboriginal representative body with which the state could negotiate a treaty. This resulted in the 2019 Victorian First Peoples' Assembly election, to elect the 21 members of the First Peoples' Assembly.

=== Indigenous voice to government ===
On 30 October 2019, Wyatt announced the commencement of a "co-design process" aimed at providing an "Indigenous voice to government". The Senior Advisory Group is co-chaired by Tom Calma, Chancellor of the University of Canberra, and Marcia Langton, Associate Provost at the University of Melbourne, and comprises a total of 20 leaders and experts from across the country. The models for the Voice are being developed in two stages:

1. First, two groups, one local and regional and the other a national group, will create models aimed at improving local and regional decision-making, and identifying how best federal government can record Indigenous peoples' views and ideas. The groups consist mainly of Indigenous members.
2. Consultations will be held with Indigenous leaders, communities and stakeholders to refine the models developed in the first stage.

The first meeting of the group was held in Canberra on 13 November 2019.

== See also ==
=== Australia ===
- 1967 Australian referendum (Aboriginals)
- Aboriginal land rights in Australia
  - Native title in Australia
    - Terra nullius § Australia
    - Mabo v Queensland (No 2)
    - Wik Peoples v Queensland
- Australian Aboriginal sovereignty
- Constitutional recognition of Indigenous Australians
- Indigenous treaties in Australia
- Voting rights of Aboriginal and Torres Strait Islander peoples

=== General ===
- Indigenous self-government in Canada
- Native American self-determination
- Indigenous rights
