= Lionel Proctor =

Australian rules footballer

Personal information
- Full name: Lionel Proctor
- Nickname: Jacko
- Born: 27 November 1979 (age 46)
- Original team: Alphington/Preston U18s
- Debut: Round 6, 1 May 1998, Richmond vs. Brisbane, at The Gabba
- Height: 179 cm (5 ft 10 in)
- Weight: 74 kg (163 lb)

Playing career^{1}
Years	Club	Games (Goals)
1998–2001	Richmond	20 (4)

Coaching career
Years	Club	Games (W–L–D)
2021–2024	Fitzroy Stars (NFNL)	
- ^{1} Playing statistics correct to the end of 2001.

Lionel Proctor (born 27 November 1979) is an Australian rules footballer who played for the Richmond Football Club in the Australian Football League (AFL) between 1998 and 2001.

Proctor coached the Fitzroy Stars Football Club in the Northern Football Netball League (NFNL) from 2021 until the end of the 2024 season.
