= Allan government =

Government of Victoria from 2023 to 2026

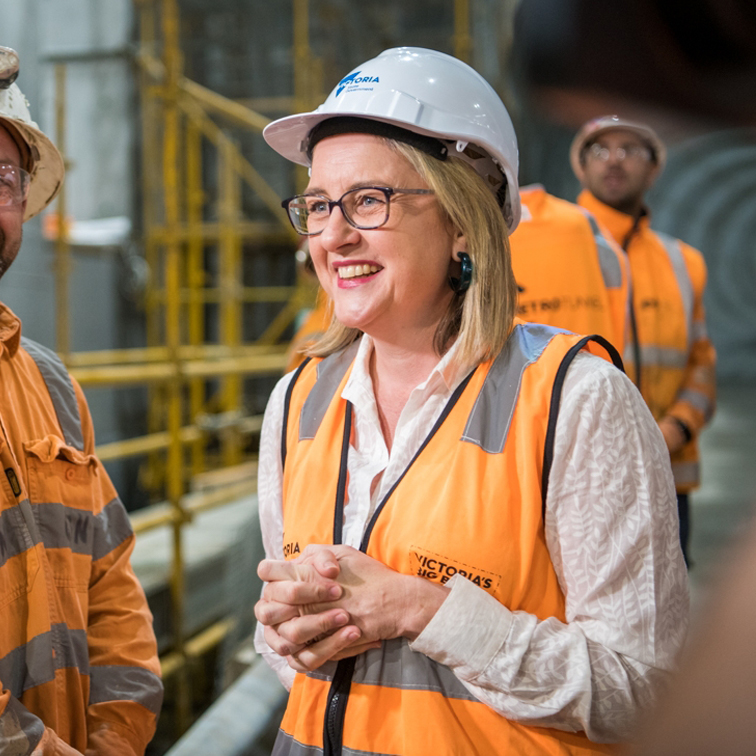
- Premiership of Jacinta Allan; 27 September 2023 – 28 July 2026
- Governor: Margaret Gardner
- Cabinet: Allan
- Party: Labor
- Election: 2023
- Appointed by: Governor Margaret Gardner
- Seat: 1 Treasury Place
- Victoria

The Allan government was the state executive government of Victoria, Australia, led by Premier Jacinta Allan of the Labor Party. It began on 26 September 2023 when Allan took over as premier following the resignation of Daniel Andrews, and concluded with Allan's resignation, leading to the 2026 Victorian Labor Party leadership election which resulted in Deputy Premier of Victoria Ben Carroll winning the election uncontested and subsequently forming government on 28 July 2026.

== Ministry ==
On 2 October 2023, the full ministry was sworn in.

== Term of government (2023–2026) ==
=== Age of criminal responsibility ===
In June 2024, the Allan Labor Government introduced the Youth Justice Bill 2024, passing the Victorian Parliament in August 2024. The Youth Justice Act 2024 raised the age of criminal responsibility to 12 in 2025 and also codified a rebuttable doli incapax presumption for children under 14.

Minister for Youth Justice, Enver Erdogan, said in June 2024 that the Government still planned to eventually raise the age to 14, however, in August 2024 Premier Jacinta Allan walked back those plans.

==== Bail reform ====
On the 12 March 2025 the Allan government introduced a bill to the Victorian Parliament that would seek to strengthen the state's bail laws.

On 18 March the Victorian Legislative Assembly, Victoria's lower house, met and gave the amendments their assent. The parliamentary session was met with protests by a coalition of groups made up of the Human Rights Law Centre, the Federation of Community Legal Services Victoria, the Victorian Aboriginal Legal Service and advocacy service provider Flat Out.

Two days later, on 20 March, the Victorian Legislative Council, Victoria's upper house, met to debate the proposed amendments. The amendments faced opposition from both the Coalition and the Greens, but after concessions were made to the Coalition, including removing the word "tough" from the name of the bill, the amendments were passed and came into effect immediately.

Changes to the state's bail laws included:

- The reclassification of home invasions and carjackings as more serious offences.
- That tougher bail tests be implemented.
- That youth offenders no longer be remanded in custody only as a "last resort".
- That those accused of Schedule 2 crimes such as sex crimes, manslaughter and armed robbery, must show "compelling reasons" to explain why they should be bailed. This is in place of the previous system where the prosecution was expected to prove the accused should not be granted bail.

The amendments were met with criticism from across the political spectrum. To the right of Labor, The Coalition criticised the new changes for not being strong enough, with Shadow Attorney-General Michael O'Brien labelling the changes "weak". In response to criticism from the Coalition, Attorney-General Sonya Kilkenny claimed that the Coalition was more "focused on semantics... than protecting Victorians". To the Left of Labor, the Greens opposed the changes, claiming they reversed the protections put in place after the bail laws were loosened after the death of Aboriginal woman Veronica Nelson.

==== Machete ban ====
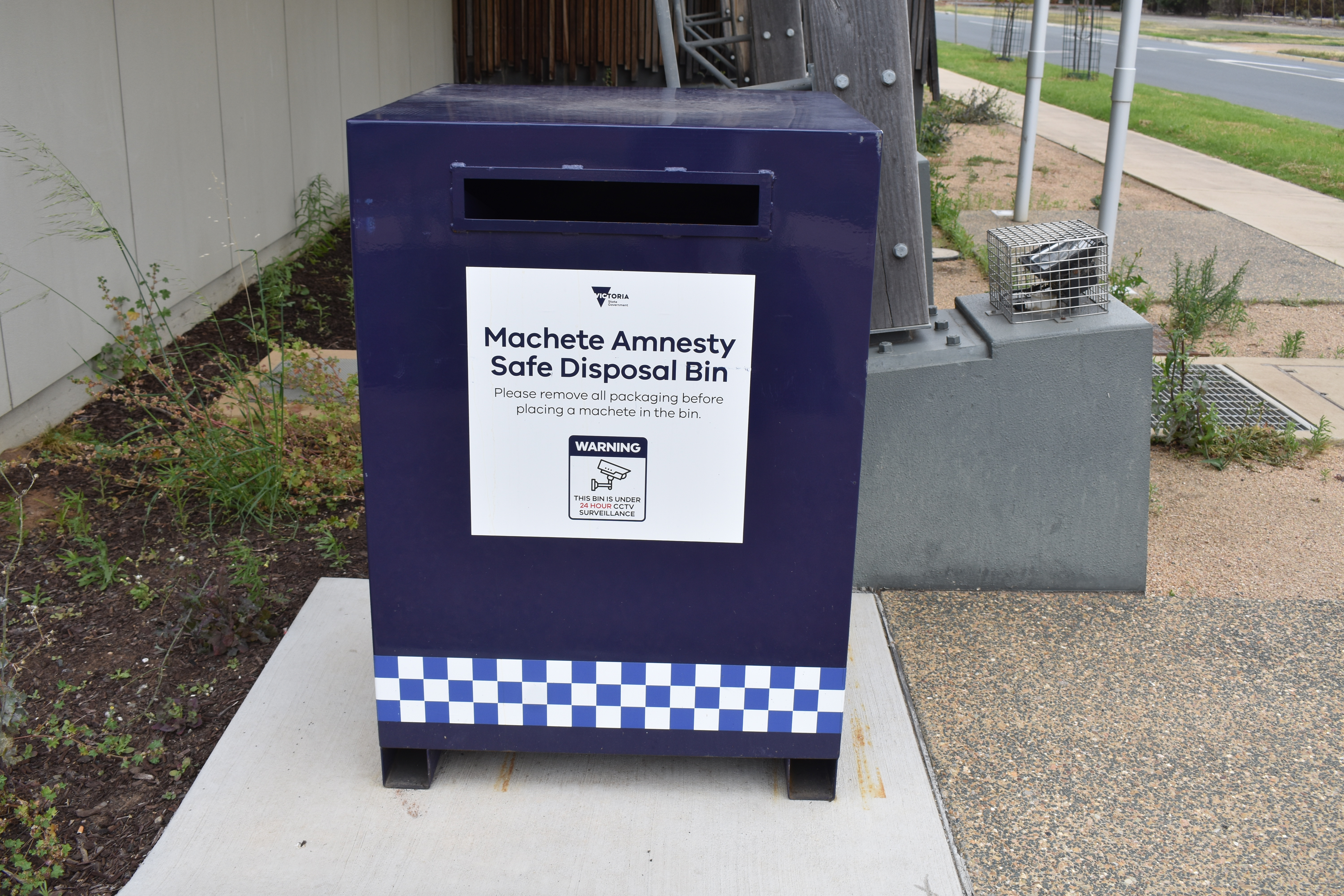
A machete bin in Echuca

Since the start of 2025, the Allan government has faced pressure to legislate against machete and knife-based attacks. On 13 March 2025, the Allan government announced a package of crime reforms which included a ban on machetes. An immediate ban was ruled out and it was announced that a permanent law would be introduced on 1 September, with an amnesty period from then to 30 November, allowing machete owners to hand in their machetes without penalisation.

As a result of a gang-related knife fight in Northland Shopping Centre, the Allan government announced on 26 May that a blanket ban on the sale of machetes would begin on 28 May, lasting until the permanent law comes into effect on 1 September.

On 1 June 2025, in the early hours of the day, members of the National Socialist Network, a neo-Nazi organisation, staged a protest outside the shopping centre. They dressed in all black and concealed their faces with balaclavas while holding a banner saying "Ban Niggers, Not Machetes". Premier Allan condemned their actions, and police were investigating the incident.

=== Economic policy ===
On 18 October 2023, the High Court of Australia ruled that Victoria must remove an excise it had placed on drivers of electric vehicles. They ruled based on the principle that states do not have the power under the constitution to charge excises for consumption.

On 28 November 2023, the government announced that the tax on vacant homes would be increased. Previously, vacant homes were taxed at 1% of their value annually. The new law would tax them at 1% in the first year of vacancy, 2% in the next and 3% in the third and any after.

Meeting state debt is a significant challenge for Allan's government, which stood at $126 billion by March 2024. S&P believes reports the debt will reach $247.2 billion by 2027.

On 15 May 2025, after negotiations with the state branches of the Greens, Legalise Cannabis and the Animal Justice Party, the government passed the Fire Services Property Amendment (Emergency Services and Volunteer Fund) Bill. The bill increased the rate at which landowners in the state are taxed as part of the existing "fire services levy". The rates paid by residential landowners increased from 8.7 cents per $1000 of property value to 17.3 cents. The rates paid by farmers increased from 28.7 cents per $1000 worth of property value to 71.8 cents. The passage of the bill triggered protests by farmers and members of the Country Fire Authority (CFA). On the same day that the bill was passed large numbers of CFA members staged walk offs, rendering at least 25 CFA brigades inoperative. On 20 May thousands of protestors descended on the Victorian Parliament House to voice their opposition to the bill. In attendance with the protestors were Liberal MPs Bev McArthur and Nicole Werner.

=== Environmental policy ===
On 13 November 2023, the government introduced legislation to amend biosecurity laws to double fines for individuals trespassing on farms.

On 8 January 2024, federal environment minister Tanya Plibersek intervened to prevent the Victorian government constructing a wind turbine assembly plant, over concerns about wetlands at the Port of Hastings.

On 29 January 2024, the government rejected a recommendation from a government inquiry into duck hunting that called for a ban of the practice. Recently, The Allan government proposed three new national parks west of Melbourne.

=== Family violence ===
On 18 October 2023, the Victorian attorney general Jaclyn Symes announced legislation to make a new offence specifically for non-fatal strangulation.

=== Foreign policy ===
On 23 December 2023, the government announced that refugees of the Gaza war would receive free medical care in Victoria.

=== Health policy ===
On 28 November 2023, the government announced that three additional public hospitals (Eastern Health, Peninsula Health and Western Health) would offer abortion services.

On 22 January 2024, Allan announced an inquiry into access to care for women with chronic pain.

On 24 June 2024, Allan announced a trial of pill testing would take place in Summer 2024.

=== Homelessness ===
On 11 March 2024, The Age reported that it had obtained government tender documents showing that the "From Homelessness to a Home" program would be cut by 75 percent from July 2024. Participants of the program have a 90 percent success rate in finding a permanent home within 12 months of joining. Prior to the cut, the program supported 2000 participants a year, and will support 500 per year from July 2024.

=== Infrastructure ===
On 30 November 2023, the government announced A$245 million of funding via the State Electricity Commission of Victoria for the Melbourne Renewable Energy Hub, a battery storage facility. It was completed in December 2025 with 600 MW of output and 1,600 MWh of energy, making it among the largest battery facilities in the world at the time.

On 12 December 2023, the government announced that the first contract for the Suburban Rail Loop had been signed, worth A$3.6 billion. The contract funds 16 km of tunnelling between Cheltenham and Glen Waverley.

On 15 December 2023, the government announced an increase to the budget for the North East Link, taking it from A$15.8 billion to A$26.1 billion. A$13.43 billion of the increased cost is due to expansion in the project's scope, and A$3.1 billion is due to the increased cost of construction materials.

=== Parliamentary affairs ===
On 18 November 2023, the Victorian parliament achieved gender parity with the victory of Labor candidate Eden Foster at the 2023 Mulgrave state by-election.

On 1 December 2023, Allan announced changes to the ministerial code of conduct. These changes included a requirement for ministers' diaries to be publicly released, a ban on the employment of family members, and declare gifts, benefits and hospitality they receive. The first set of diaries was released in February 2024.

=== Neo-Nazism ===
On 17 October 2023, the Victorian parliament passed legislation introduced by the government that banned public display of Nazi symbolism or performing the Nazi salute in public.

In 2024, Jacob Hersant became the first person charged with making Nazi gestures in public, under the new Victorian state laws.

=== Religious affairs ===
On 27 February 2024, the Islamic Council of Victoria (ICV) rejected an invitation from the government to attend their annual Iftar dinner over the Australian Labor Party's position on the Israel-Hamas war. The ICV President stated "Out of respect for the suffering of the Palestinians, it just would not be appropriate to hold such an event". On 29 February 2024, the government cancelled the event.

=== Treaty ===
On 9 September 2025, Allan introduced a bill in the Legislative Assembly, the Statewide Treaty Bill 2025, to enact and implement the treaty, as well as making the First Peoples' Assembly a permanent authority under an umbrella body known as Gellung Warl. The body would include an independent accountability mechanism, as required by the National Agreement on Closing the Gap. The bill passed the Legislative Council on 30 October 2025, with 21 votes to 16. Labor, the Greens, Animal Justice Party and Legalise Cannabis Victoria voted yes while the coalition, Shooters, Fishers and Farmers, Libertarian party and One Nation voted against.
