= Fitzroy Stars Football Club =

Names
- Full name: Fitzroy Stars Football & Netball Club
- Nickname: Stars

2024 season
- After finals: NFNL: 2nd NFNLW: 4th
- Home-and-away season: NFNL: 1st NFNLW: 3rd
- Leading goalkicker: NFNL: Patrick Farrant (59); NFNLW: Nartarsha Bamblett (14)
- Best and fairest: NFNL: Allan Norris; NFNLW: Nartarsha Bamblett

Club details
- Founded: 1973; 53 years ago
- Colours: Red Yellow Black
- Competition: NFNL: Division 3 NFNLW: Division 2
- Coach: NFNL: Neville Jetta
- Premierships: VACSAL Carnival (16): 1986; 1987; 1993; 1995; 1997; 1998; 2001; 2005; 2006; 2007; 2023

Uniforms
1976−1980

Other information
- Official website: fitzroystars.com.au (archived)

The Fitzroy Stars Football Club is an Australian rules football club based in the Melbourne suburb of Thornbury. It is the only football club in Melbourne run by Indigenous Australians.

As of 2024, the club men's team competes in Division 3 of the Northern Football Netball League (NFNL), while the women's team is in Division 2 of the NFNL Women's competition. The club also competes in the annual VACSAL Football Netball Carnival, where it has won the George Atkinson State Championship a total of 16 times.

== History ==
=== Early years ===
The Fitzroy Stars were formed in 1973 and joined C Grade in the Metropolitan Football League (MFL) the same year, playing home games at Brunswick Street Oval. They were quickly promoted, and defeated Dallas Stars by 32 points in the 1974 A Grand grand final. However, the MFL disbanded at the end of the season and was replaced by the Northern Metropolitan Football League (NMFL) in 1975, which the Stars entered. From 1976 until 1980, the club wore the same jumper as the Fitzroy Football Club.

The NMFL disbanded after 1979, and the Stars were left without a competition to play in for several years. (Note: A 1988 article from Tribune, the official newspaper of the Communist Party of Australia, states that the Fitzroy Stars was expelled from the NMFL "mainly because they were mostly Aborigines". However, Footypedia states that the NMFL in fact disbanded in 1980.) They entered the YCW Football League (YCWFL) in 1984 and were defeated in the B Grade grand final by the BYC Football Club, before winning the Division 1 premiership in 1986.

When the YCWFL folded in 1986, the Stars applied for entry in 36 local competitions, but received rejections from every single one. As a result, club president Jock Austin formed the Melbourne North Football League (MNFL) in 1988. They won the grand final that year, with further MFNL premierships in 1989 and 1990, as well as back-to-back grand final losses to Heidelberg Colts in 1993 and 1994. However, the MNFL disbanded following the conclusion of the 1994 season, leaving the Stars to compete solely in football carnivals.

=== NFNL ===
In 2006, after 12 years playing in carnivals, the Stars launched a new bid to join the Northern Football League (NFL, later NFNL). The push was led by club president Troy Austin (son of Jock) and gained the support of Kevin Sheedy in 2007, who became the number-one ticket holder.

Before any decision had been made on their entry, the Stars began training at W.R. Ruthven Reserve in Preston. They were accepted into the NFL in 2008 and entered Division 2, where they just missed the finals series after winning 10 of their 18 games. The club used Crispe Park, Bill Lawry Oval and Preston City Oval as home grounds throughout the 2008 season.

In 2012, Sir Douglas Nicholls Oval (where the Stars had played until the end of 1994) was rebuilt with funding provided by the Darebin City Council. The Stars played their at the ground for the first time in the NFL in June 2013.

The Stars reintroduced junior teams in 2018. They also planned to field a women's team for the first time in 2020, before the season was cancelled as a result of the COVID-19 pandemic. The women's team eventually entered the NFNL in 2021.

Neville Jetta, who played 159 games for Melbourne in the Australian Football League (AFL), was announced in October 2024 as the Stars' senior men's coach for the 2025 season. He replaced former Richmond player Lionel Proctor.

== See also ==
- Brunswick Power Football Club
