= Age of criminal responsibility in Australia =

Age of criminal responsibility in Australia by state or territory. 10 years old 12 years old 14 years old

The age of criminal responsibility in Australia is the age below which a child is deemed incapable of having committed a criminal offence. In legal terms, it is referred to as a defence of infancy. Most states and self-governing territories of Australia have adopted 10 years of age as a uniform age of criminal responsibility, except for the Australian Capital Territory and Victoria.

Concerns have been raised about the effects of criminalisation of such young children, and in particular the effects on Aboriginal Australians and Torres Strait Islander people, who are disproportionately represented in the statistics, often reflecting as well as increasing a cycle of disadvantage. In 2019, the Council of Attorneys-General Age of Criminal Responsibility Working Group was tasked with considering submissions from a range of organisations and experts of various backgrounds regarding raising the age to 14. In mid 2020, they indicated that more work was needed to be done on alternative forms of punishment before they could make their recommendations, and in late 2021, the Council of Attorneys-General failed to reach a national consensus.

== Background ==
Doli incapax refers to a presumption that a child is "incapable of crime" under legislation or common law, or rather, the presumption that a child cannot form mens rea as they do not yet have a sufficient understanding of the difference between "right" and "wrong". In the context of Australian law, doli incapax acts as a rebuttable presumption for children aged at least 10 but less than 14.

To rebut this presumption, the prosecution must prove beyond reasonable doubt that the child knew that the act was seriously wrong (not by standards of law, but morally or according to the ordinary principles of reasonable persons) as distinct from an act of "mere naughtiness or childish mischief".

== Statistics ==
According to a 2018 SBS article, around 600 children under 14 are locked up in Australian prisons each year.

On an average night in June 2019, there were 949 young people imprisoned in Australia. Of these:

- 90% were male;
- 83% were aged 10–17 (the remainder 18–20);
- 63% were unsentenced;
- 53% were Aboriginal and/or Torres Strait Islander youth.

In the year ending 30 June 2020, there were almost 600 children aged 10 to 13 in detention in Australia.

From June 2015 to 2019, the Northern Territory had the highest rate of young people in detention on an average night.

== Calls to raise minimum age ==
In 2018, legal and medical experts called for the age to be raised to 16. In response, the state and commonwealth Attorneys General decided to investigate the matter, and the Council of Attorneys-General Age of Criminal Responsibility Working Group was established to do this.

According to Australian Medical Association President Dr Tony Bartone, raising the minimum age of criminal responsibility will prevent the unnecessary criminalisation of vulnerable children. In an Australian Medical Association media release, Dr Bartone said:

Australia has one of the lowest ages of criminal responsibility in the world.

The criminalisation of children in Australia is a nationwide problem that disproportionately impacts Aboriginal and Torres Strait Islander children.

Most children in prison come from backgrounds that are disadvantaged. These children often experience violence, abuse, disability, homelessness, and drug or alcohol misuse.

Criminalising the behaviour of young and vulnerable children creates a vicious cycle of disadvantage and forces children to become entrenched in the criminal justice system.

Children who are forced into contact with the criminal justice system at a young age are also less likely to complete their education or find employment, and are more likely to die an early death.

In November 2019, then Attorney-General of Australia, Christian Porter, was of the opinion that the current system was working well.

In the year ending on 30 June 2020, there were almost 600 children aged 10 to 13 in detention in Australia. Criminologist Chris Cuneen cites a number of well-founded reasons for increasing the minimum age of criminal responsibility in Australia to 14, echoing Dr Bartone's list above. Doctors, lawyers, and a range of experts have called for the minimum age to be raised to 14.

The Australian Human Rights Commission submitted its report, Review of the age of criminal responsibility, to the Working Group on 26 February 2020. The Law Council of Australia submitted its report on 2 March 2020. However, in July 2020 the Working Group said that more work needed to be done to determine alternative ways to deal with young offenders, and that the age would remain as it is for at least another year. Both the Attorney General of New South Wales, Mark Speakman, and the Attorney General of South Australia, Vickie Chapman, expressed would not consider passing state laws until the Working Group had finished its review.

By late 2021, the Council of Attorneys-General had failed to reach a national consensus on the issue.

As of 2022, the debate continues. Criminologist Terry Goldsworthy points out that the sentencing issue is separate from the age of criminal responsibility, and that the number of children held in custody is "exceedingly small", with custodial sentences having declined significantly since 2010. He also argues that the victims of crime (citing the James Bulger case in the UK) need to be taken into consideration. Those concerned with the health and welfare of the children concerned say that incarcerating them can cause "irreparable harm", especially "those with complex neurodevelopmental and mental health needs, trauma, substance misuse, and social disadvantage, [who] are overly represented in the youth justice system.

=== Effects on Indigenous children ===
There has been much commentary on the effect that incarceration of children has on Aboriginal and Torres Strait Islander people's lives, with Indigenous children disproportionately represented in the figures (more than 60% of 10–13-year-olds). The Law Council, the Royal Australasian College of Physicians and others have said that there needs to be more emphasis on "support services, treatment, early intervention, prevention, justice reinvestment initiatives, and community-led diversion programs", built on Indigenous authority and culture. The matter of incarceration of Indigenous adults and children, and a recognition of its relationship to disadvantage, has been recognised and reflected in the 2020 targets of the federal government's Closing the Gap strategy.

A documentary film by Maya Newell called In My Blood It Runs follows a ten-year-old Arrernte/Garrwa boy who got into trouble and was almost imprisoned. As a twelve-year-old, the boy was the youngest person ever to make a speech to the UN Human Rights Council about youth incarceration.

== Changes ==
=== Western Australia ===
In October 2021, the Western Australian Labor Party passed a motion at their state party conference to raise the age to 14.

=== Queensland ===
In March 2022, the Queensland Government rejected a bill to raise the age to 14, with a parliamentary committee recommending a continued national approach to increasing the age to 12.

=== Tasmania ===
In June 2022, the Tasmanian Government announced that it would raise the minimum age of detention to 14, but with no change to the age of criminal responsibility.

=== South Australia ===
In July 2022, Greens MLC Robert Simms raised a bill in the South Australian Government to raise the age to 14, with Attorney-General and Aboriginal Affairs Minister Kyam Maher taking much interest in the issue.

=== Victoria ===
In April 2023, the Victorian Government committed to raising the age of criminal responsibility to 12 by the end of 2024 and to 14 by 2027.

In June 2024, the Allan Labor Government introduced the Youth Justice Bill 2024, passing the Victorian Parliament in August 2024. The Youth Justice Act 2024 raised the age of criminal responsibility to 12 in 2025 and also codified a rebuttable doli incapax presumption for children under 14. Minister for Youth Justice, Enver Erdogan, said in June 2024 that the Government still planned to eventually raise the age to 14, however, in August 2024 Premier Jacinta Allan walked back those plans.

=== Northern Territory ===
On 13 October 2022, legislation was introduced to the Northern Territory Government to raise the age of criminal responsibility to 12 years of age. Instead of children of 10 and 11 entering the criminal justice system, they and their families would be referred to "intensive parenting programs", and the government would be expanding various schemes and family support services. The bill, introduced by Attorney-General Chansey Paech, was expected to pass, making NT the first Australian jurisdiction to raise the age above 10, although the commencement date was delayed until 2023.

During the 2024 Northern Territory general election the Country Liberal Party (CLP) opposition had a policy to lower the age of criminal responsibility back to 10. The Country Liberal Party won these elections.

On 17 October 2024, legislation introduced by the CLP Northern Territory Government to lower the age of criminal responsibility back to 10 years of age passed the parliament.

=== Australian Capital Territory ===
In August 2020, the Legislative Assembly of the ACT voted to increase the age of criminal responsibility to 14 in line with UN standards, a move welcomed by Indigenous advocates. The support was in principle only.

On 1 November 2023, the ACT passed legislation raising the age of criminal responsibility to 14 on 1 July 2025, with a transition period raising the age to 12 until then.

The legislation came into force on 22 November 2023, raising the age of criminal responsibility from 10 to 12. For any 12-14 year old child to be convicted of a crime, the child must know their conduct is wrong. The burden of proof for the fact the 12-14 year old child knew their conduct was wrong lies with the prosecution.

After 1 July 2025, the age of criminal responsibility is again raised from 12 to 14. However, children aged 12 to 14 can still be convicted of four serious crimes, if the child knows their conduct is wrong. The burden of proof for the fact the 12-14 year old child knew their conduct was wrong still lies with the prosecution. The serious crimes are:

- Murder
- Grievous bodily harm
- Sexual assault in the first degree (Grievous bodily harm inflicted with the intent of sexually penetrating another person)
- Act of indecency in the first degree (Grievous bodily harm inflicted with the intent of committing an "act of indecency" upon another person). "Act of indecency" is not defined in the Crimes Act 1900 of which it forms a part. However, it is defined under common law as an act which would "offend the ordinary modesty of the average person", such as non consensual sexual touching or sexual acts in public.

== By jurisdiction ==
Jurisdiction	Doli incapax Cannot be charged with a criminal offence	Rebuttable doli incapax acts as a rebuttable presumption	Age in adult court	Reference
Commonwealth	Under 10	10 to under 14	18	Crimes Act 1914, s4M Criminal Code Act 1995, s7.1 Crimes Act 1914, s4N Criminal Code Act 1995, s7.2
Australian Capital Territory	Under 14 (Except for murder, grievous bodily harm or sexual acts where the accused commits GBH, for which 12-14 year olds can be convicted)	12 to under 14 (only for serious crimes listed left)	18	Criminal Code 2002, s25, s26 Justice (Age of Criminal Responsibility) Legislation Amendment Act 2023, s93, s94
New South Wales	Under 10	10 to under 14	18	Children (Criminal Proceedings) Act 1987, s5; Common law doli incapax
Northern Territory	Under 10	10 to under 14	18	Criminal Code, s38, s38A
Queensland	Under 10	10 to under 14	18	Criminal Code, s29
South Australia	Under 10	10 to under 14	18	Young Offenders Act 1993, s5; Common law doli incapax
Tasmania	Under 10	10 to under 14	18	Criminal Code Act 1924, s18(1) Criminal Code Act 1924, s18(2)
Victoria	Under 12	12 to under 14	18	Youth Justice Act 2024, s10; Youth Justice Act 2024, s11
Western Australia	Under 10	10 to under 14	18	Criminal Code Act Compilation Act 1913, s29

== See also ==
- Indigenous Australians and crime § Children in detention
- Juvenile detention in the Northern Territory
- Punishment in Australia
