= Agreements, Treaties and Negotiated Settlements =

Website relating to Indigenous agreements

Agreements, Treaties and Negotiated Settlements (ATNS) is a website collecting agreements relating to Indigenous Australians.

== Background ==
The Agreements, Treaties and Negotiated Settlements (ATNS) began in 2002 as a project titled Agreements, Treaties and Negotiated Settlements with Indigenous Peoples in Settler States: their role and relevance for Indigenous and other Australians, after receiving an Australian Research Council Linkage Grant. The project launched at the Native Title Conference in Alice Springs in June 2003, and its website is hosted by University of Melbourne.

The project aimed to carry out research on treaties and agreements, examinging their legal histories, status, and outcomes. It was expected that the project would be completed in 2005. However, in 2006, ATNS expanded to include looking at how those agreements were implemented. The project was extended again in 2010. Later, in 2020, the website was relaunched in partnership between the University of Melbourne and the National Native Title Council. They commenced an audit of the agreements, and continued their aim make their collection available to a wider audience.

Alongside agreements, ATNS contains a glossary of related terminology and access to their own publications. It excludes confidential information.

ATNS has been used in research by Australian Institute of Aboriginal and Torres Strait Islander Studies.
