= Jill Gallagher =

Australian community activist (born 1955)

Jill Gallagher AO
- Born: Jillian Gallagher; 1955 (age 70–71); Canberra
- Occupations: CEO, Victorian Aboriginal Community Controlled Health Organisation
- Awards: Officer of the Order of Australia

Jillian Gallagher AO (born 1955) is a proud Gunditjmara woman from Australia who has been the chief executive officer of the Victorian Aboriginal Community Controlled Health Organisation (VACCHO) since 2001. As a single mother in her twenties Gallagher was accepted into a training scheme for young Aboriginal people at the Museum of Victoria. She worked on the return of the Murray Black Collection and served as manager of the heritage branch of Minister for Aboriginal Affairs (Victoria) before taking up a position at VACCHO in 1998. In 2017 Gallagher was appointed Commissioner of the Victorian Treaty Advancement Commission until the voting period ended in October 2019. Gallagher was inducted into the Victorian Honour Roll of Women in 2009 and the Victorian Aboriginal Honour Roll in 2015. She was made an Officer of the Order of Australia in 2013.

== Early life ==
Gallagher was born in 1955, one of 10 children, in the Australian Capital Territory, principally recognised as Ngunnawal Country. Her mother was a Gunditjmara woman and her father was of Irish descent. Gallagher's father died in an accident when she was a baby.

Work available to Aboriginal people was limited and Gallagher's mother travelled extensively for seasonal work picking vegetables. Gallagher spent much of her early childhood in Gunaikurnai country, Gippsland. Her community revolved around the seasonal camps inhabited by other seasonal workers.

In 1963 Gallagher's family moved to Collingwood on Wurundjeri Country, where her mother found work in a box factory. Gallagher graduated from the George Street Primary School after attending 13 different schools, and continued her education at the Fitzroy Girls' School. She was rebellious, clashed with teachers, left school at the age of 14 and ran away from home, living on the streets before returning home and commencing work in a factory.

Early memories include living in a camp on Braiakaulung country on the Avon River at Stratford dotted by the glow of dozens of campfires, and her mother being asked to leave a whites only hotel in Warrnambool.

== Career ==
In her early twenties, and a single mother, Gallagher regretted leaving school at an early age. She applied for, and was accepted into a training scheme for Aboriginal young people at the Museum of Victoria. She took up a position at the Victoria Archaeological Survey, which offered her the opportunity to learn about Aboriginal history including culture, language and the devastating effect of European settlement had on Aboriginal people. She took on a role as manager of the heritage branch of Aboriginal Affairs Victoria which enabled her to pass her knowledge on to young people. While with Museums Victoria Gallagher worked on the return of the Murray Black Collection, (Note: The Murray Black Collection is a collection of 800 Aboriginal skeletal remains estimated to be 10,000 to 14,000 years old. The remains were held by the University of Melbourne and were transferred to the custody of Museums Victoria for return to their burial grounds along the Murray River, after the Aboriginal Legal Service took action in the Supreme Court.) to Aboriginal communities in northern Victoria and Southern New South Wales. She continues to serve on the National Committee for the Repatriation of Skeletal Remains.

In 1998 Gallagher took a position at the Victorian Aboriginal Community Controlled Health Organisation (VACCHO), (Note: VACCHO is the peak body representing and advocating for the community controlled Aboriginal health services in Victoria.) and in 2001 she became its CEO. She quickly recognised tobacco as a major cause of health problems within the Aboriginal community and, in 2008, gave up smoking after 40 years. She actively encouraged VACCO employees and each Aboriginal health organisation in Victoria to develop a stop smoking campaign and to become smoke free. The idea was to provide leadership in aboriginal communities, and reduce the burden on a stretched health services.

As CEO of VACCHO Gallagher obtained bi-partisan support from the Victorian Government for the statement of intent to close the 17 year life expectancy gap between indigenous and non-indigenous Australians. The statement was signed in 2008 by Victorian Premier John Brumby. She lists this as one of her most significant achievements as CEO of VACCHO.

In January 2018 Gallagher took 18 months leave of absence from VACCHO when she was appointed Commissioner of the Victorian Treaty Advancement Commission. The commission was set up to create an Aboriginal representative body to establish rules for future treaty negotiations with the Victorian Government. The commission will be wound up once the representative body is formed.

In 2009 Gallagher was diagnosed with stage 4 bowel cancer which had spread to her liver and diaphragm. She had two surgeries and chemotherapy and has used her experience to promote cancer awareness in the Aboriginal community.

Gallagher has served on a number of state government and statutory advisory committees, including the Victorian Early Childhood Development Advisory Committee, the Equal Opportunity Commission Victoria Indigenous Reference Group, the Child Death Review, the Cooperative Research Centre on Aboriginal Health, and the Premiers Aboriginal Advisory Committee.

Gallagher has cited mentors Jim Berg (Note: Jim Berg is a Gunditjmara artist. He was the CEO of the Victorian Aboriginal Legal Service when he founded the Victorian Aboriginal Cultural Heritage Trust in the mid-1980s. He was instrumental in the repatriation of the Murray Black Collection.) of the Koorie Heritage Trust and Terry Garwood (Note: Terry Garwood is a Yorta, Wemba Wemba and Wergaia. He is a career Victorian public servant. During his time at Aboriginal Affairs Victoria his key work included co-ordinating Victoria's responses to the Royal Commission into Aboriginal Deaths in Custody and the National Inquiry into the Forced Removal of Aboriginal and Torres Strait Islander Children from their Families. He ensured that Victoria co-operated fully with the stolen generation enquiry.) of Aboriginal Affairs Victoria as great influencers, but is inspired mostly by her mother for her resilience and determination in the face of the hardship she endured.

== Awards ==
- Victorian Honour Roll for Women inductee 2009
- Officer of the Order of Australia 2013 "For distinguished service to the indigenous community of Victoria, through leadership in the area of health and contributions to cultural, welfare and professional organisations."
- Victorian Aboriginal Honour Roll inductee 2015

== See also ==
- Aboriginal Australians
- Indigenous health in Australia
