= Geraldine Atkinson =

Australian First Nations educator

Geraldine Atkinson AO
- Born: 1952 (age 73–74); Leeton, New South Wales, Australia
- Education: Deakin University
- Occupation: Co-Chair
- Employer: NATSIEC
- Known for: First Nations Leadership and Education

Geraldine Atkinson AO is Bangerang/Wiradjuri woman, and who was recognised as an Officer of the Order of Australia in the 2025 King’s Birthday Honours for her contributions to education. She was President of the Victorian Aboriginal Education Association Inc. (VAEAI) from 1999 to 2023, leading change in indigenous education and policy.

== Education and early life ==
Atkinson born in Leeton, NSW, Australia, in 1952 and was one of 14 children. She went to primary school in Mooroopna, and subsequently attended Nathalia Secondary School.

Atkinson graduated with a Bachelor of Education from Deakin University in 2013, and then was awarded a Master of Education in 2019. She was subsequently awarded an honorary doctorate from Deakin University for her leadership in Aboriginal education.

== Career ==
Atkinson's early career started when she was employed as a teacher's aide in a secondary school in Shepparton, Victoria. She played a role in creating a Child Care Centre and Kindergarten, now known as the Lullas Family and Children Centre in Shepparton.

Atkinson has been the president of the Victorian Aboriginal Education Association since 1999. She was also the inaugural co-chair of the First Peoples' Assembly of Victoria.

Atkinson's passion for education, particularly for those First Nations children in the Shepparton area in Victoria, led to her becoming the President of the VAEAI. She contributed to educational policies, and strategies surrounding First Nations education in Victoria. Subsequently, she represented the VAEAI on various state and national committees, providing advice on educational policy. She has spent much of her career making sure First Nations children received the foundations for learning, in a setting which is culturally appropriate.

For 20 years Atkinson was an Advisory Board Member for the National Indigenous Knowledges Education and Research and Innovation Institute at Deakin University. She is a board member with numerous boards and government bodies and initiatives. Atkinson also represents all Indigenous Education Consultative Bodies (IECBs) in Australian Territories and States on the Ministerial Taskforce for Education, Early Childhood Development and Youth Affairs (MCEEDYA).

== Awards ==
- 2008 – Member, Victorian Honour Roll of Women
- 2018 – Member, Victoria Aboriginal Honour Roll
- 2020 – Honorary Doctorate from Deakin University
- 2020 – Lynne Kosky Memorial Award for Lifetime Achievement in education
- 2025 – Officer of the Order of Australia, King's Birthday Honours
