= Age of criminal responsibility in Europe =

The age of criminal responsibility in Europe refers to the age below which an individual is considered to be unsuitable for being held accountable for their criminal offence, and in this case, how it is handled under different areas of jurisdiction in Europe. The most common age of criminal responsibility in Europe is 14.

== Countries ==
Countries are listed alphabetically:

- Albania: 14
- Andorra: 12
- Armenia: 14
- Austria: 14
- Azerbaijan: 14
- Belarus: 14
- Belgium: 12
- Bosnia and Herzegovina: 14
- Bulgaria: 14
- Cyprus: 14
- Czech Republic: 15
- Denmark: 15
- Estonia: 14
- Finland: 15
- France: 13
- Germany: 14
- Greece: 15
- Hungary: 12
- Iceland: 15
- Ireland: 12
- Italy: 14
- Kosovo: 14
- Latvia: 14
- Liechtenstein: 14
- Lithuania: 14
- Luxembourg: 15
- Malta: 14
- Montenegro: 14
- Netherlands: 12
- Norway: 15
- Poland: 15
- Portugal: 16
- Romania: 14/16
- Russia: 14
- Serbia: 14
- Slovakia: 14
- Slovenia: 14
- Spain: 14
- Sweden: 15
- Switzerland: 10
- Ukraine: 14
- United Kingdom (except Scotland): 10
  - Scotland: 12

== England and Wales ==
The age of criminal responsibility in England and Wales is 10, the joint lowest in Europe alongside Switzerland. The UN Committee on the Rights of the Child has called for the age of criminal responsibility in England and Wales to be raised to at least 14, as have top judges in England and Wales, including former president of the supreme court Lady Hale. Professor Roger Evans, emeritus professor of socio-legal studies at Liverpool John Moores University, has stated that, "Lady Hale is absolutely right to say that the prosecution of children under 14 is wrong and to ask the government to raise the age of criminal responsibility to at least 14, as is the case in most European countries", noting that the "vast majority of empirical research" signals that it would be a better approach. A raise to 14 is also backed by Shami Chakrabarti, the former director of Liberty. Fiona Rutherford, the chief executive of the charity Justice, called the current criminal age of responsibility of 10, "cruel and irrational", as well as, "at odds with international norms and years behind the science on brain development". In December 2025, a Ministry of Justice spokesperson said the government are not changing the age of criminal responsibility.

== Norway ==
=== De jure ===
Everyone aged 16 and above can be sent to prison and get equal punishment as an adult. If someone under the age of 16 is intoxicated, seen outside alone after 22:00 or trespassing, the police can detain or drive the individual home. If they choose to detain them at a police station, they can be detained for a maximum of 4 hours. If the police notice someone under the age of 16 doing criminal acts, the police can decide to have obligatory meetings with the teen/child and the parents. This can only happen if the criminal is under the age of 18.

=== De facto ===
People under the age of 18 rarely get imprisoned. There are rarely more than 10 people under the age of 18 imprisoned in Norway. This is because judges rarely find it ethical to imprison youths, and the organization "Barneombudet" which advises heavily against imprisoning youths. First-time criminals under the age of 18 doing petty crimes usually get no punishment and get released with only a warning.

== Portugal ==
Persons under the age of 16 cannot be held criminally liable. Persons aged between 12 and 16 can be subject to penalties under the Guardianship and Education Law, which allows for the detention of children in closed educational centres. [Criminal Code, Article 19; Lei Tutelar Educativa 1999 (Guardianship and Education Law), Articles 1 and 4]

== See also ==
- Age of consent in Europe
- Age of majority
- Drinking age
- Legal smoking age
- Legal status of tattooing in European countries
- List of enlistment age by country
- Voting age
