= Basic Principles for the Treatment of Prisoners =

1990 UN General Assembly resolution

The Basic Principles for the Treatment of Prisoners were adopted and proclaimed by the General Assembly of the United Nations by resolution 45/111 on 14 December 1990.

Article 1 protects human dignity. Article 2 bans discrimination.
