= Age of criminal responsibility =

Minimum age of a child committed crime

Minimum age of criminal responsibility by country

The age of criminal responsibility is the age below which a child is deemed incapable of having committed a criminal offence. In legal terms, it is referred to as a defence/defense of infancy, which is a form of defense known as an excuse so that defendants falling within the definition of an "infant" are excluded from criminal liability for their actions, if at the relevant time, they had not reached an age of criminal responsibility. After reaching the initial age, there may be levels of responsibility dictated by age and the type of offense committed.

Under the English common law the defense of infancy was expressed as a set of presumptions in a doctrine known as doli incapax. A child under the age of seven was presumed incapable of committing a crime. The presumption was conclusive, prohibiting the prosecution from offering evidence that the child had the capacity to appreciate the nature and wrongfulness of what they had done. Children aged 7–13 were presumed incapable of committing a crime but the presumption was rebuttable. The prosecution could overcome the presumption by proving that the child understood what they were doing and that it was wrong. In fact, capacity was a necessary element of the state's case (thus, the rule of sevens doctrine arose). If the state failed to offer sufficient evidence of capacity, the infant was entitled to have the charges dismissed at the close of the state's evidence. Doli incapax was abolished in England and Wales in 1998 for children over the age of 10, but persists in other common law jurisdictions.

== Terminology ==
The terminology regarding such a defense varies by jurisdiction and sphere. "Defense of infancy" is a mainly US term. The "age of criminal responsibility" is used by most European countries, the UK, Australia, New Zealand and other Commonwealth of Nations countries. Other instances of usage have included the terms age of accountability, age of responsibility, and age of liability.

The term minimum age of criminal responsibility (MACR) is a term commonly used in the literature.

The rationale behind the age of accountability laws are the same as those behind the insanity defense, insinuating both the mentally disabled and the young lack apprehension.

== The age of criminal responsibility ==
Governments enact laws to label certain types of activity as wrongful or illegal. Behavior of a more antisocial nature can be stigmatized in a more positive way to show society's disapproval through the use of the word criminal. In this context, laws tend to use the phrase, "age of criminal responsibility" in two different ways:

1. As a definition of the process for dealing with an alleged offender, the range of ages specifies the exemption of a child from the adult system of prosecution and punishment. Most jurisdictions develop special juvenile justice systems in parallel to the adult criminal justice system. Here, the hearings are essentially welfare-based and deal with children as in need of compulsory measures of treatment and/or care. Children are diverted into this system when they have committed what would have been an offense as an adult.
2. As the physical capacity of a child to commit a crime. Hence, children are deemed incapable of committing some sexual or other acts requiring abilities of a more mature quality.

== Discussion ==
This is an aspect of the public policy of parens patriae. In the criminal law, each state will consider the nature of its own society and the available evidence of the age at which antisocial behaviors begins to manifest itself. Some societies will have qualities of indulgence toward the young and inexperienced, and will not wish them to be exposed to the criminal law system before all other avenues of response have been exhausted. Hence, some states have a policy of doli incapax (i.e. incapable of wrong) and exclude liability for all acts and omissions that would otherwise have been criminal after reaching a specified age. Hence, no matter what the child may have done, there cannot be a criminal prosecution. However, although no criminal liability is inferred, other aspects of law may be applied. For example, in Nordic countries, an offense by a person under 15 years of age is considered mostly a symptom of problems in child's development. This will cause the social authorities to take appropriate administrative measures to secure the development of the child. Such measures may range from counseling to placement at a special care unit. Being non-judicial, the measures are not dependent on the severity of the offense committed but on the overall circumstances of the child.

The policy of treating minors as incapable of committing crimes does not necessarily reflect modern sensibilities. Thus, if the rationale of the excuse is that children below a certain age lack the capacity to form the mens rea of an offense, this may no longer be a sustainable argument. Indeed, given the different speeds at which people may develop both physically and intellectually, any form of explicit age limit may be arbitrary and irrational. Yet, the sense that children do not deserve to be exposed to criminal punishment in the same way as adults remains strong. Children have not had experience of life, nor do they have the same mental and intellectual capacities as adults. Hence, it might be considered unfair to treat young children in the same way as adults.

The United Nations Committee on the Rights of the Child recommends setting an age of criminal responsibility of 14, though it has also stated an age of 15 or 16 would be welcome.

In Scotland, the age of criminal responsibility was raised from 8 to 12 by the implementation of the Age of Criminal Responsibility (Scotland) Act 2019, which came into force on 31 March 2020. In England and Wales and Northern Ireland, the age of responsibility is 10 years, and in the Netherlands and Canada the age of responsibility is 12 years. Finland and Norway all set the age at 15 years whilst in Sweden the age is set at 14 years for serious crimes. In the United States, the minimum age for federal crimes is 11 years. State minimums vary, with 24 states having no defined minimum age, and defined minimums ranging from 7 years in Florida to 13 years in Maryland and New Hampshire.

== By country ==
The following are the minimum ages at which people may be charged with a criminal offence in each country:

Country	Age (reduced) (Note: For only certain severe crimes and/or rebuttable doli incapax. May also imply reduced sentencing/punishment for all crimes)	Age (full) (Note: For all crimes and/or full responsibility (in terms of sentencing).)	Ref	Notes
Afghanistan	12			Minimum age of criminal responsibility is 12. Children aged 7–12 can be subject to warnings, supervision by social services, or confinement to a rehabilitation centre.
Albania	14	16		Article 1 of the Code distinguishes between offences and contraventions. Article 12 mandates that the latter (which are less serious) have a higher age limit of 16.
Algeria	13	18		
Andorra	12	18/21		
Angola	14			Minimum and maximum sentences are reduced by two thirds between 14 and 16, and half between 16 and 18. The needs of rehabilitation and social reintegration are also to be taken into account for minors.
Antigua and Barbuda	8	16		According to Articles 1 and 3 of the Juvenile Act, Courts must have regard to the welfare of those under 14.
Argentina	14	18		Lowered in February 2026 from 16 to 14.
Armenia	14			
Australia	10/12/14	14/18/21		Age of criminal responsibility in Australia. Review under way since 2019. Rebuttable presumption of incapacity until age 14. Notes Juvenile offenders aged 14–17 are always held criminally responsible, but they are usually tried as young/youthful/juvenile offenders, meaning generally more lenient sentences compared to adults. However, there are exceptions when the crimes committed are deemed too serious (such as murder) to be sentenced as a non-adult offender (for instance in Tas, sentencing under the Youth Justice Act is capped at a maximum of 2 years detention, which is sometimes not deemed enough for severe crimes). Offenders under 18 generally cannot be held in adult remand centres or prisons; but there are exceptions for some violent/dangerous offenders aged 16 or (particularly when) 17 years old. Also, juvenile offenders' photos and names usually cannot be released by the media, and access to the juvenile court list/courtroom is restricted to authorized people only. Nevertheless, juvenile offenders found guilty or convicted still obtain a permanent (but usually sealable) criminal record as if they were adults (hence the criminal responsibility), but with generally reduced waiting times and often more lenient standards for convictions to become 'spent' or 'annulled' depending on Commonwealth, State, or Territory legislation applicable. Full adult criminal responsibility in terms of sentencing and conviction annulment eligibility for all crimes at age 18 (21 in Victoria) (Note: Under the 'dual track' system of sentencing youth 18-20 to youth detention for less severe crimes.)
Austria	14	18/21		
Azerbaijan	14	16		
Bahrain	15			
Bangladesh	9			
Belarus	14	16		16 is the standard age of criminal liability in Belarus. Minors between 14 and 16 years old are responsible only for certain severe crimes, according to article 27 of the Belarusian Criminal Code.
Belgium	12			
Belize	7			
Benin	13			
Bhutan	10			
Bolivia	14			Lowered in July 2014 from 16 to 14.
Bosnia and Herzegovina	14			
Botswana	8			
Brazil	12	18		Full criminal responsibility from age 18, with a juvenile judiciary system for offenders aged between 12 and 18 who can be sentenced to a maximum of 3 years of imprisonment in separate juvenile jails. On June 2026, there was a proposal to reduce the full age to 16.
Brunei	7			
Bulgaria	14			The maximum sentence that can be imposed on juvenile offenders can be no more than 12 years of imprisonment if the offenders are between 16 and 18 and no more than 10 years if they are between 14 and 16. Juvenile offenders serve their sentences in separate prisons up to the age of 18.
Burkina Faso	13			
Burundi	15			
Cambodia	14			
Cameroon	10			
Canada	12/14-17	14-17/18		Notes Children aged 12 or 13 can only be sentenced as juveniles for any crime, meaning more leniency with regards to recording and future disclosing of any juvenile criminal record, and reduced sentencing (maximum custodial sentence of 10 years for any crime). Youth aged 14-17 are generally sentenced as juveniles for more minor crimes, but are usually are sentenced as adults for more serious crimes (but generally still with more lenient sentences than those aged 18 or older). Youth aged 14-17 can be sentenced to life imprisonment but must have a minimum (and reduced) non-parole period set).
Cape Verde	16			
Central African Republic	14			
Chad	13			
Chile	14	16		
China	12	16		Since 1 March 2021, children between 12 and 14 can be held criminally responsible for intentional homicide or injury leading to death or severe disability committed with extreme cruelty subject to approval by the Supreme People's Procuratorate. Notes 14 is the absolute minimum for acts that constitute the following crimes: homicide, wounding resulting in death, rape, robbery, arson, explosion, planting of toxic substances, and trafficking in dangerous drugs. The minimum age for other crimes are 16. In Hong Kong, the minimum age is 10 and in Macau, 16.
Colombia	14	18		
Comoros	13/14-15			Depends whether Sharia Law or the Penal Code is applied.
Costa Rica	12			Even though legal procedures and punishment are different for offenders who are under 18, all offenders who are 12 or older may be sentenced to as much as 15 years of incarceration.
Cote d'Ivoire	10			
Croatia	14	18		
Cuba	16	18/21		
Cyprus	14			
Czech Republic	15	18		
Denmark (including Faroe Islands)	15	18		
DR Congo	14	16		
Djibouti	13			
Ecuador	12	18		
El Salvador	12	18		
Egypt	12			
Equatorial Guinea	16			
Eritrea	12			
Estonia	14	18/21		
Eswatini	7	14		
Ethiopia	9			
Fiji	10			
Finland	15	18		
France	13	18		
Gabon	13			
Gambia	12			
Georgia	14			Section 33 of Criminal code of Georgia defines that minors between 14 and 17 can be charged with criminal responsibility by juvenile justice.
Germany	14	18/21		Minors between 14 and 17 are sentenced by juvenile justice. A young adult between 18 and 21 years may still be sentenced by juvenile justice if considered mentally immature.
Ghana	12			
Greece	15	18/21		
Guinea	10			
Guinea Bissau	16			
Hungary	12	18		12 only for premeditated homicide, voluntary manslaughter and bodily harm leading to death or resulting in life-threatening injuries; 14 for other crimes; full criminal responsibility from age 18.
Iceland	15	18		
India	7	12		Rebuttable presumption of incapacity until age 12. Minors could be detained for up to a maximum of 3 years, but in 2015, this maximum was raised to 7 years and minors aged between 16 and 18 can be tried as adults for heinous offences such as murder, rape, etc. They cannot, however, be sentenced to death or life imprisonment.
Indonesia	12	18		
Iran	9 (girls), 15 (boys)			
Iraq	9			
Ireland	10	12		Exception for children aged 10 or 11, who can be charged with murder, manslaughter, rape, or aggravated sexual assault.
Israel	12			
Italy	14			Juvenile judiciary system for offenders aged between 14 and 18; separate juvenile halls.
Japan	14			Juvenile Training Schooling for offenders aged between 11 and 14.
Jordan	12			
Kazakhstan	14	16		
Kenya	8			
Kosovo	14	18/21		
Kuwait	7			
Kyrgyzstan	14	18		
Laos	15			
Latvia	14	18		
Lebanon	7			
Lesotho	10			
Liberia	7			
Libya	14	18		
Liechtenstein	14	18/21		
Lithuania	14	16		
Luxembourg	15			
Madagascar	13			
Malawi	7			
Malaysia	10			Notes Malaysia has a dual system of secular and Islamic law, which has resulted in a number of different minimum ages of responsibility depending on which branch of the law is applicable.: Under the Penal Code, a person can be held criminally responsible from the age of 10. [Penal Code, Article 82. See also Child Act Article 2]; Under the Syariah Criminal Offences (Federal Territories) Act 1997, Muslim children can be held criminally responsible from the onset of puberty. [Syariah Criminal Offences (Federal Territories) Act 1997, Articles 2 and 51]; Offences under the Internal Security Act can be prosecuted regardless of age. [Essential (Security Cases) Regulations 1975, Article 3] (The act was repealed in 2012 and replaced with Security Offences (Special Measures) Act 2012)
Maldives	15	18		Sharia law allows pubescent minors below 15 to be held responsible for certain severe crimes, as well as minors 15 and above without a rebuttal of presumption of incapacity.
Mali	13			
Mauritania	7			
Mauritius	0	14		There is no minimum age for criminal responsibility. Children below age 14 can only face incarceration if they are proven to have enough discernment between right and wrong.
Mexico	12	16		Incarceration starting at age 14. Other measures applied for ages 12–13.
Moldova	14	16/21		
Mongolia	14	16		Children between 14 and 16 years old responsible only for certain severe crimes.
Montenegro	14			
Morocco	12			
Mozambique	16			
Myanmar	7	12		
Namibia	7	12		
Nepal	10			
Netherlands	12/16-21	16-21/22		From age 16, persons may be tried as adults or as children ("jeugdstrafrecht"). The maximum age for a person to be tried as a minor is 21.
New Zealand	10	14		Rebuttable presumption of incapacity until age 14. Children aged 10 and 11 can only be convicted of murder or manslaughter; children aged 12 and 13 can only be convicted of crimes with a maximum imprisonment of at least 14 years, but this may be increased circumstantially. See Youth justice in New Zealand.
Nicaragua	13			
Niger	13			
Nigeria	7			
North Korea	14			
North Macedonia	16	18		Persons aged 14 to 16 years at the time they committed an offence, known as "younger juveniles" within the Criminal Code, can only be sentenced to educational measures
Norway	15	18		
Oman	9			
Pakistan	7	12		There is a rebuttable presumption that a child aged between 7 and 12 years old is incapable of committing a crime.
Palau	10			
Papua New Guinea	7			
Panama	12			Lowered in 2010 from 14 to 12.
Paraguay	14			Minor offenders can be sentenced to a maximum of 8 years of imprisonment.
Peru	14	18		Notes 18 is the standard age of criminal liability in Peru. However, minors from 16–17 years old at the moment of the crime may be subject to 6 to 10 years in prison in case of homicide, femicide, extortion, vandalism, rape or being member of a criminal gang. Minors from 14–15 years at the moment of any of those same crimes may be subject to 4 to 8 years in prison.
Philippines	15	18		On 28 January 2019, the House of Representatives passed a bill proposing to lower the minimum age of criminal responsibility from 15 years to 12 years with a vote of 146–34. As of 2020, some child rights advocates were opposing this and other related bills in favor of a less fragmented approach addressing children's issues.
Poland	13	17		Notes 17 is the standard age of criminal liability in Poland. Minors from the age of 15 can be tried as adults in relation to especially heinous crimes such as treason, assassination of Polish President, murder, homicide, serious bodily harm, causing a catastrophe, assault of a public servant, hostage-taking, rape and robbery, when "the circumstances of the case and the mental state of development of the perpetrator, his characteristics and personal situation warrant it, and especially when previously applied educational, therapeutic or corrective measures have proved ineffective". On the other hand, the Court may choose to apply juvenile measures for perpetrators above the age of 17 but below the age of 18, if "the circumstances of the case and the mental state of development of the perpetrator, his characteristics and personal situation warrant it". Juvenile correctional proceedings liability age is 13. Juvenile educational and therapeutic proceedings liability applies to all persons under the age of 18 (including persons below 13 years of age). The maximum possible sentence that can be imposed on offenders taking criminal liability under 18 years of age is 25 years' imprisonment.
Portugal	12	16		Between the age of 12 and 16, a convict is classified as a “juvenile offender” and can only be sentenced to educational measures or juvenile detention.
Qatar	7			
Romania	16	18		A child aged 14 to 16 can only be held criminally liable where it can be proved that he or she had "discernment" Notes For offences for which an adult would be sentenced to life imprisonment, a person between the ages of 14 and 18 would be sentenced to no more than 15 years of "strict imprisonment" For offences for which an adult would be sentenced to "severe detention" a person between the ages of 14 and 18 would be sentenced to no more than 12 years of "strict imprisonment"
Russia	14	16		Notes 16 by default, 14 years specifically for crimes as listed in Section 20 of the Criminal code, like murder, rape, robbery, extortion, kidnapping, motor vehicle theft, terror attack, stealing restricted substances like explosives or narcotics, aggravated anti-social behaviour, vandalism, false report of a terror attack.
Rwanda	14			
San Marino	14	18/21		
São Tomé and Príncipe	16			
Saudi Arabia	12			
Senegal	13			
Serbia	14	18		Persons aged 14 or 15 ("younger juveniles") can only be sentenced to educational measures
Seychelles	7			
Sierra Leone	14			
Singapore	10			The Penal Code Review Committee proposed to increase the age to 10. Offenders between 16 and 21 are classed as Young Adults and may be considered for reformative training.
Slovakia	14			
Slovenia	14	18/21		
Solomon Islands	8			
Somalia	14/15			15 in Somaliland, 14 in the rest of the country.
South Africa	12	14		The age of criminal capacity was raised to 12 by the Child Justice Amendment Act, 2019. There is a rebuttable presumption that a child between the ages of 12 and 14 lacks criminal capacity.
South Korea	12	14		
South Sudan	12			
Spain	14	18		Notes A person under the age of 18 can be sentenced to closed detention for a single offence if: (i) the facts establish that the person has committed a felony under the Penal Code or special penal laws; (ii) the relevant crime was classified as a misdemeanour, but involved violence or intimidation against persons or has generated serious risk to life or physical safety; or (iii) the acts are classified as crimes committed in groups, organisations or associations Persons aged 14 or 15 may be sentenced to a maximum of three years detention and persons aged 16 or 17 may not be sentenced to more than six years detention.
Sri Lanka	12	14		Rebuttable presumption of incapacity until age 14.
Sudan	12	18		
Sweden	14	18		Previously the full age was 21, was reduced down to 18 in 2021. On 10 September 2026, the minimum age for serious crimes was reduced to 14.
Switzerland	10	18		Children aged 15 years at the time an offence was committed cannot be sentenced to more than one year of detention Notes A child aged 16 or over when an offence was committed may not be sentenced to more than four years in detention, and only where: (i) he or she committed an offence for which an adult could be sentenced to detention of more than three months; or (ii) he or she has committed an offence under Article 122 of the Criminal Code, related to intentionally inflicting a life-threatening injury; or (iii) he or she commits robbery as a member of a group formed for the purposes of carrying out repeated robberies or thefts under Article 140(3) of the Criminal Code; or (iv) the behaviour of the offender is such as to show particular ruthlessness or the behaviour or purpose of the act reveal a highly reprehensible state of mind
Syria	10			
Taiwan	12/14	18		Minors between 12 and 14 cannot be trialed in criminal court, but could still be sentenced to juvenile probation or sent to correctional schools. Minors between 14 and 18 are subject to Criminal Code but qualify for reduction of sentence. Finally, the death penalty and life imprisonment cannot be sentenced to minor offenders.
Tajikistan	14	16		
Tanzania	7			
Thailand	7	14		
Timor-Leste	16			
Togo	14			
Turkey	12	18		
Turkmenistan	14	16		
Tunisia	13			
Uganda	12			
Ukraine	14	16		
United Arab Emirates	7			
United Kingdom	10/12	12/15		10 in England, Wales, and Northern Ireland. Usually persons aged 10–11 will only be imprisoned in very serious cases, such as murder. Even more so the outcome for youth (12–17) criminal proceedings are usually age categorised (currently it will depend on whether the offender is under 12, under 14, under 16 or under 18, with the older the offender the more severity of punishment, especially for serious crimes). 12 in Scotland. Children under 12 cannot be convicted or get a criminal record; from 12 to 15, decision usually made by the Children's Reporter whether to refer to a children's hearing, which can lead to a criminal record, but could be prosecuted for a criminal offence if the offence is serious.
United States	6–12/10–18 (varies by jurisdiction)	10–18/16–19 (varies by jurisdiction)		Notes The age of juvenile criminal responsibility or juvenile adjudication means that while the juvenile is guilty of committing the delinquent crime/act, they are not criminally responsible as an adult would be. As a result, their criminal records are generally annulled and/or expunged after a certain time depending on factors such as the jurisdiction, age and/or crime(s) committed. Juvenile offenders found guilty may also be sentenced to juvenile detention/reformatory, but again this can vary significantly based on various factors aforementioned. In terms of minimum age of juvenile criminal adjudication/responsibility, most US jurisdictions have no explicit minimum age. This includes the federal jurisdiction, who rely more on state law for prosecuting juvenile offending at the federal level (unless trying the juvenile as an adult). For jurisdictions that do have a minimum age specified, the range varies significantly (6–12) depending on the jurisdiction and/or crime(s) committed. The standards for transferal of juveniles to adult courts also varies significantly by jurisdiction and may combine statutory limits with prosecutorial and judicial discretion. While not as commonly inexplicit as the minimum age of juvenile adjudication, many states and territories also do not have an explicit minimum age set for transfer to adult court. For those that do, the age set ranges from 10 to 16, with 14 being the most common age. The minimum age of (adult) criminal responsibility and transfer is 15 (de jure)/16 (de facto) at both the federal level and in DC. The mandatory age of transfer to adult court (for certain severe crimes and/or for those with a significant criminal history) is 16 at the federal level and in DC. While it ranges from 10 to 18 (or is not specified) for some or all crimes, at the state and territory level. The age of full adult criminal responsibility/majority (when an offender is automatically and always tried and sentenced as an adult for all crimes) ranges from as young as 16 in Florida to as old as 19 in Vermont, with 18 being by far the most common age in most US jurisdictions (including federal).
Uruguay	13	18		
Uzbekistan	13	16		"Persons can be held criminally responsible for all offences committed after they have reached the age of 16, and for intentional killing from the age of 13, and for other specifically named offences from the age of 14. [Criminal Code, Article 17]"
Vanuatu	10			
Venezuela	14			
Vietnam	14	16		
Yemen	7			
Zambia	8	12		
Zimbabwe	7	14		

== Juvenile courts ==
In some countries, a juvenile court is a court of special jurisdiction charged with adjudicating cases involving crimes committed by those who have not yet reached a specific age. If convicted in a juvenile court, the offender is found "responsible" for their actions as opposed to "guilty" of a criminal offense. Sometimes, in some jurisdictions (such as the United States of America), a minor may be tried as an adult.
