= Barunga Statement =

Aboriginal Australian land claims

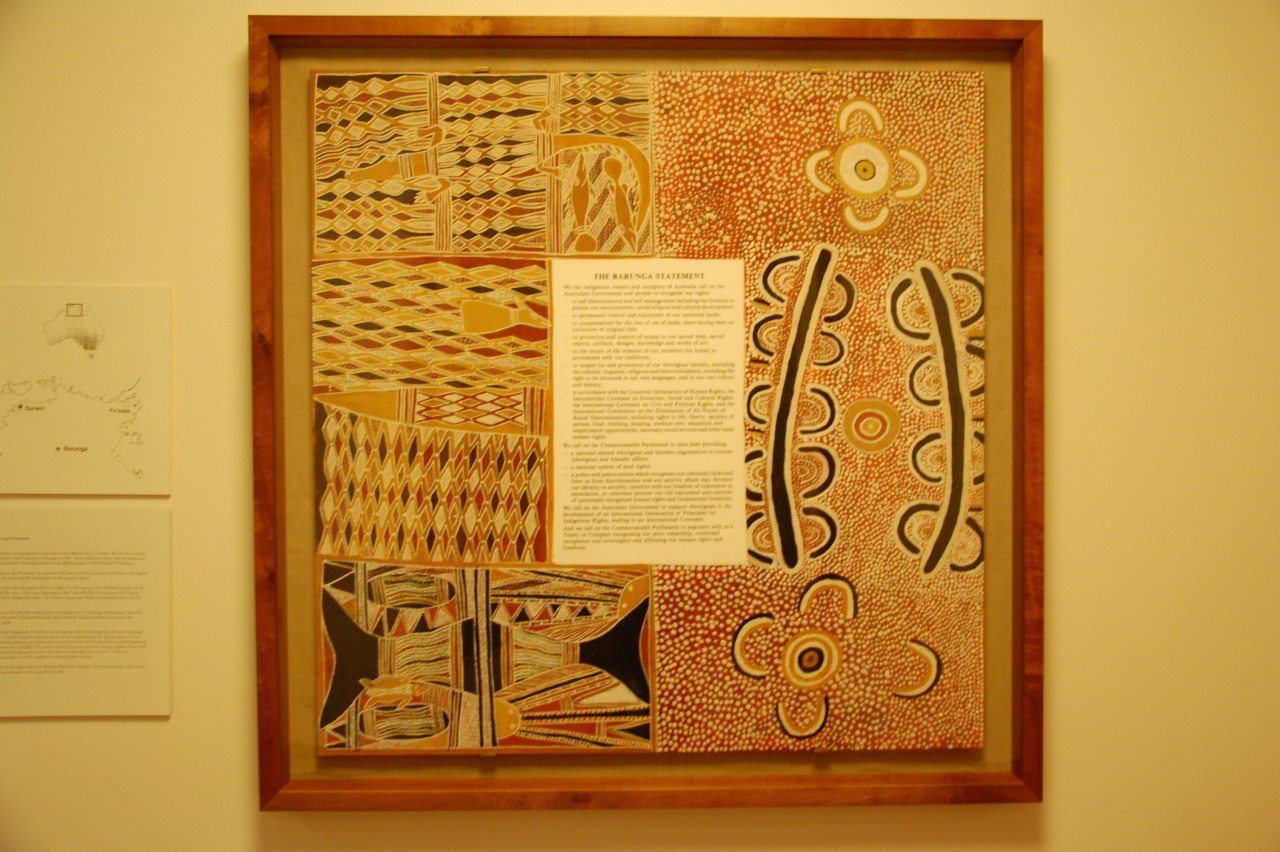
The Barunga Statement on display in Parliament House, Canberra

The Barunga Statement was presented to then Prime Minister of Australia Bob Hawke on 12 June 1988 at the Barunga Festival. It demands the recognition of Land Rights and a treaty.

== The Statement ==
In 1988, as part of Bicentennial celebrations, the prime minister of Australia Bob Hawke visited the Northern Territory for the Barunga Festival, where he was presented with a statement of Aboriginal political objectives by Galarrwuy Yunupingu and Wenten Rubuntja. Painted on a 1.2 metre square sheet of composite wood, it became known as the "Barunga Statement". It stated:

We, the Indigenous owners and occupiers of Australia, call on the Australian Government and people to recognise our rights:
to self-determination and self-management, including the freedom to pursue our own economic, social, religious and cultural development;
to permanent control and enjoyment of our ancestral lands;
to compensation for the loss of use of our lands, there having been no extinction of original title;
to protection of and control of access to our sacred sites, sacred objects, artefacts, designs, knowledge and works of art;
to the return of the remains of our ancestors for burial in accordance with our traditions;
to respect for and promotion of our Aboriginal identity, including the cultural, linguistic, religious and historical aspects, and including the right to be educated in our own languages and in our own culture and history;
in accordance with the universal declaration of human rights, the international covenant on economic, social and cultural rights, the international covenant on civil and political rights, and the international convention on :the elimination of all forms of racial discrimination, rights to life, liberty, security of person, food, clothing, housing, medical care, education and employment opportunities, necessary social services and other basic rights.
We call on the Commonwealth to pass laws providing:
A national elected Aboriginal and Islander organisation to oversee Aboriginal and Islander affairs;
A national system of land rights;
A police and justice system which recognises our customary laws and frees us from discrimination and any activity which may threaten our identity or security, interfere with our freedom of expression or association, or otherwise prevent our full enjoyment and exercise of universally recognised human rights and fundamental freedoms.
We call on the Australian Government to support Aborigines in the development of an international declaration of principles for indigenous rights, leading to an international covenant.
And we call on the Commonwealth Parliament to negotiate with us a Treaty recognising our prior ownership, continued occupation and sovereignty and affirming our human rights and freedom.

Hawke responded by saying that he wished to conclude a treaty between Aboriginal and other Australians by 1990, but his wish was not fulfilled. Controversy erupted over the exposure of sacred material in the bark painting, leading some Indigenous leaders to call for its return. Some leaders alleged the presentation of the painting resulted in at least ten deaths due to "munya", which translates as remorse in the Aboriginal system of payback.

In 1991, Hawke's last act as prime minister was to hang the Barunga Statement at Parliament House, Canberra. He did so one minute before Paul Keating was sworn in as the new prime minister, stating "its presence here calls on those who follow me, it demands of them that they continue efforts that they find solutions to the abundant problems that still face the Aboriginal people of this country".

=== Yothu Yindi song "Treaty" ===
In June 1991 Australian Aboriginal band, Yothu Yindi, wrote and released the hit song "Treaty" to commemorate the statement. Lead singer Mandawuy Yunupingu, with his older brother Galarrwuy, wanted to highlight the lack of progress on the treaty between Aboriginal peoples and the federal government. Mandawuy said:

Bob Hawke visited the Territory. He went to this gathering in Barunga. And this is where he made a statement that there shall be a treaty between black and white Australia. Sitting around the camp fire, trying to work out a chord to the guitar, and around that camp fire, I said, "Well, I heard it on the radio. And I saw it on the television." That should be a catchphrase. And that's where 'Treaty' was born.

== The Barunga agreement (2018) ==
On 8 June 2018, just before the opening of the Barunga Festival, the Northern Territory Government signed a Memorandum of Understanding (MoU), since known as the Barunga agreement, to begin talks with all four of the Territory's Aboriginal land councils, on the subject of a treaty. The agreement, which was drafted after a week of discussions which included about 200 elected members of the land councils, included some guiding principles, including that "Aboriginal people were the prior owners and occupiers of the land, seas and waters that are now called the NT of Australia". The land councils involved are the Northern, Central, Anindilyakwa and Tiwi Land Councils. One of the essential elements was seen as truth telling, "Truth telling is critical. Unless we understand each other, and understand how we've been impacted even by the best intentions of the other side, it's pretty hard to construct a new relationship".

The only two surviving senior men of the nine who painted the Barunga statement in 1988, Rirratjingu clan leader Galarrwuy Yunupingu and fellow Yolngu leader Djambawa Marawili, were present on Friday as the treaty agreement was signed.

== See also ==
- 1972 Larrakia Petition
- Uluru Statement from the Heart
- Yirrkala bark petitions
- Yirrkala Church Panels
