= First Peoples' Assembly of Victoria =

Elected body for Indigenous people in Australia

The First Peoples' Assembly of Victoria is an independent and democratically elected body representing Traditional Owners and Aboriginal and Torres Strait Islander peoples in Victoria, Australia. The Assembly is responsible for establishing the framework and ground rules to enable Traditional Owners to negotiate treaties with the Victorian Government.

In September 2025 new legislation tabled by the Victorian Government, the Statewide Treaty Act 2025, made the First Peoples' Assembly a permanent authority under an umbrella body known as Gellung Warl. The legislation would also create two new bodies, one of which would continue the process of truth telling begun by the Yoorrook Justice Commission.

== History ==
The First Peoples' Assembly of Victoria has its origins in the Aboriginal Representative Body (ARB), established in 2016. The new name and form was set out by the Victorian Government in 2018 after passing legislation to create an independent elected body to negotiate treaties between the government and First Nations peoples in Victoria.

The Assembly came into being after the elections held in October 2019.

Further elections were held over three weeks in 2023. There was a record turnout of voters, who elected 22 new representatives out of 75 candidates.

In October 2025, legislation was passed to formally recognise the body as a permanent authority.

== Functions ==
The Assembly is responsible for establishing the framework and ground rules to enable Traditional Owners to negotiate Treaties with the Victorian Government.

== Structure and membership ==
The Assembly is an independent body comprising 33 members chosen by Aboriginal and Torres Strait Islander communities throughout Victoria.

Elections are held every four years. The Assembly includes both general seats, filled by members elected by communities in specific regions, and reserved seats for representatives from particular Traditional Owner groups. Any Aboriginal and/or Torres Strait Islander person who has lived in Victoria for at least three of the last five years is eligible to enroll with the Assembly.

The Assembly's current co-chairs are Meriki Onus and Djaran Murray-Jackson, as of October 2026.

== Functions ==
The Assembly's primary function is to represent Victorian Aboriginal and Torres Strait Islander communities in Treaty negotiations with the Victorian Government. The Assembly negotiated the creation of the Yoorrook Justice Commission, an independent and formal truth-telling process into historical and ongoing injustices experienced by First Peoples in Victoria.

In July 2025, the Victorian Government announced it would introduce legislation to make the assembly permanent, and establish it as an ongoing representative body that provides advice to government. The legislation would also enable the assembly to make decisions and rules about specific matters that directly impact Aboriginal and Torres Strait Islander persons in Victoria.

== Gellung Warl ==
On 9 September 2025, premier Jacinta Allan introduced a bill in the Legislative Assembly, the Statewide Treaty Bill 2025, which would establish a treaty between the government and First Nations people within Victoria, as well as making the First Peoples' Assembly a permanent authority under an umbrella body known as Gellung Warl. Gelling Warl means "tip of the spear" or "pointed spear" in Gunaikurnai language. The legislation also gives the body power to make decisions about specific matters directly affecting First Nations people. The new body will include an independent accountability mechanism, as required by the National Agreement on Closing the Gap. The legislation also created two extra bodies "to hold the government to account and to continue the truth-telling work of the Yoorrook Justice Commission".

This legislation made the Victorian Government the first state in Australia to formally table Indigenous treaty legislation in parliament.

The Liberal–National Coalition have vowed to remove the body if elected in the 2026 Victorian state election.

== Elections and member lists ==
- 2019 Victorian First Peoples' Assembly election
- 2023 Victorian First Peoples' Assembly election
