= Noel Pearson =

Australian lawyer and activist

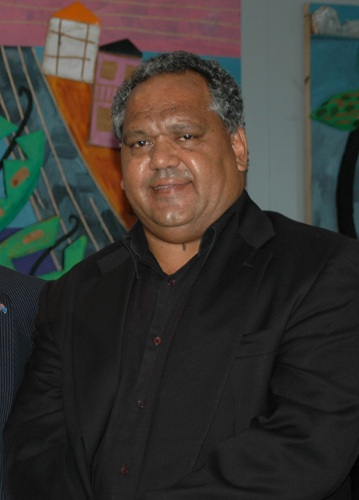
- Pearson in February 2010
- Born: 25 June 1965 (age 61); Cooktown, Queensland, Australia
- Education: University of Sydney
- Occupations: Lawyer, academic, Indigenous rights advocate, public intellectual
- Years active: 1993–
- Known for: Founder of the Cape York Institute for Policy and Leadership

Noel Pearson (born 25 June 1965) is an Aboriginal Australian lawyer, academic, and advocate for Indigenous empowerment. He is known for his work on land rights, welfare reform, and education policy, and for founding organisations such as the Cape York Land Council, Cape York Institute for Policy and Leadership, Cape York Partnership, and Good to Great Schools Australia.

A prominent public intellectual, Pearson has been a key figure in national debates on constitutional recognition and the 2023 proposed Indigenous Voice to Parliament, but his views on some topics have been controversial among Indigenous leaders, such as on the 2007 intervention in the Northern Territory, and it has been argued that the large amount of funding provided by various governments to his projects on Cape York have not been entirely successful.

Pearson is known for advocating policies which he refers to as "radical centre", although he has stated that he had given up on this in late 2017. He has been published extensively, including many articles in newspapers (notably in The Australian) and essays that have been published in collections.

== Early life and education ==
Noel Pearson was born on 25 June 1965 in Cooktown, Queensland, the son of Glen Pearson of the Baagarmuugu clan of south-eastern Cape York Peninsula, and Ivy Pearson (formerly Baird), of the Guugu Yalanji peoples.

Pearson attended primary school at Hope Vale Mission (also known as Cape Bedford Mission), which is within the present-day locality of Hope Vale. He was then sent to boarding school in Brisbane, at St Peters Lutheran College, from which he matriculated. He enrolled at the University of Sydney, graduating with a degree in history in 1987 and a law degree (LLB) in 1993.

As part of his studies, Pearson completed an honours thesis at Sydney University in 1986 titled "Ngamu-Ngaadyarr, Muuri-Bunggaga and Midha Mini in Guugu Yimithirr History: Hope Vale Lutheran Mission 1900–1950" — translated as "Dingoes, Sheep and Mr Muni in Guugu Yimithirr History". The thesis was based largely on oral history interviews, and suggests that Guugu Yimidhirr people lived parallel lives: a public life on the mission, and a private life in their community, which enabled their traditional culture and Guugu Yimidhirr language to survive. In this way, they "constructed a culture and identity within the context of European colonisation". The thesis was published by the History Department of the university, in Maps Dreams History.

== Career and advocacy ==
=== 1990s ===
In 1990 Pearson co-founded the Cape York Land Council, where he was executive director until his resignation in 1996. In 1993 he acted as representative to the traditional owners in the first land claim to the Flinders Island and Cape Melville National Park, a claim which was successful. He was still undertaking his studies while working at the land council. In 1993, Pearson was one of six Indigenous Australians who jointly presented the Boyer Lectures "Voices of the Land" for the International Year for the World's Indigenous People.

Following the Mabo decision of the High Court of Australia Pearson played a key part in negotiations over the Native Title Act 1993 as a member of the 21-strong Indigenous team, led by led by Mick Dodson and Lowitja O'Donoghue, negotiating with prime minister Paul Keating. As a 27-year-old law student in his final year, he was the youngest in the group. The bill passed into law on 22 December 1993.

According to Tim Rowse, during four terms of Coalition government from 1996 until 2007, Pearson "was forced to reposition himself". In 1999, he founded the Cape York Partnership in association with the Queensland Government, after developing his ideas to transform the lives of Cape York Indigenous people by focusing on personal responsibility, and a move away from "passive welfare".

=== 2000s ===
On 12 August 2000, Pearson delivered the Ben Chifley Memorial Lecture "The light on the hill", with an important statement of his transformed views on Indigenous policy. In it, he criticised approaches to problems which, while claiming to be "progressive", in his opinion merely keep Indigenous people dependent on welfare and out of the "real economy".

In the first decade of the 2000s, Pearson began outlining an alternative to traditional left-wing politics that he called radical centrism. In 2004, he became the founding director of the Cape York Institute for Policy and Leadership.

In 2005, Pearson developed his "Cape York Agenda", described as a "radical blueprint for the transformation of Indigenous communities through acceptance of personal and community responsibility". He said that he had drawn on the ideas of (Indian economist) Amartya Sen, and was also inspired by his work with local community Elders.

On 15 December 2006, Pearson publicly criticised the Queensland Director of Public Prosecutions, Leanne Clare, in relation to her decision not to press charges against the police officer involved in the 2004 Palm Island death in custody of Palm Island resident Mulrunji. On 26 January 2007, he welcomed the decision to prosecute the officer, after the inquiry by Sir Laurence Street found there was sufficient evidence to press charges. Pearson also argued, however, that a 20- or 30-year plan was necessary for Palm Island.

On 11 May 2007, Pearson and Indigenous Affairs Minister Mal Brough launched a new welfare scheme for Pearson's home town of Hope Vale. The scheme offered funds for home improvements, and low interest loans for home ownership. Pearson's ideas about "passive welfare" encouraged the Coalition government to get rid of the Community Development Employment Projects scheme, or CDEP, from 2007. On 14 June 2007, he launched a report by the Cape York Institute on welfare reform. The report was welcomed by Indigenous Affairs Minister Mal Brough.

On 17 September 2007, with Prime Minister Howard facing probable electoral defeat, Noel Pearson sent him a 6,000-word letter, arguing that Howard's best chance at re-election was to make a dramatic gesture in relation to reconciliation with the Aboriginal population. Her argued that Howard needed to promise a referendum on recognition of the indigenous population, and also that Howard was in a unique position to affect the course of indigenous relations, but only if Howard "bared his soul" to the Australian electorate. Howard accepted Pearson's advice, and on 11 October announced plans for a referendum, but was nevertheless comprehensively defeated at the election.

=== 2010s ===
On 13 November 2013 Pearson gave the Whitlam Oration at the Whitlam Institute at the University of Western Sydney, titled "The reward for public life is public progress: an appreciation of the public life of the Hon. E.G. Whitlam AC QC, Prime Minister 1972-1975", in praise of former Prime Minister Gough Whitlam. In November 2014, he received effusive praise for his eulogy for Whitlam, which was hailed in the Australian media as "one of the best political speeches of our time".

In 2015, Pearson was appointed by the government as a member of the Referendum Council, which was made up of Indigenous and non-Indigenous community leaders to consult Australians about changing the Constitution to recognise Aboriginal and Torres Strait Islander peoples. As a result of extensive consultation with community members across the country, the Uluru Statement from the Heart was published for sharing with the Australian people, asking for constitutional recognition, and recommending a referendum on the matter. This was rejected by the Turnbull government in October 2017, after which Pearson wrote that he had finally ended his "long game" of developing an agenda for the "radical centre", calling it "a long and dirty experiment that failed".

In November 2019, it was announced that Pearson would be one of 20 members of the Senior Advisory Group to help co-design the Indigenous voice to government set up by Ken Wyatt, the Minister for Indigenous Australians. The Group was co-chaired by Wyatt, Marcia Langton, and Tom Calma.

=== 2020s ===
In 2020 Pearson's Cape York Institute launched the "From the Heart" campaign to increase awareness and understanding of the Uluru Statement and a constitutionally-enshrined Indigenous Voice to Parliament, and to show that it is a fair and practical reform. On 27 October 2022, Pearson gave the first of his Boyer Lectures, titled "Who we were and who we can be". In these lectures Pearson explores the proposal to amend the Australian Constitution to recognise Aboriginal and Torres Strait Islander peoples as the First Peoples of Australia through an Indigenous Voice to Parliament. The second part of his lecture is titled "A Rightful But Not Separate Place".

In August 2024, Pearson joined the board of mining company Fortescue.

== Organisations and programs ==
=== Cape York Partnership ===
The Cape York Partnership is a development program founded by Pearson in 1999, based on his paper "Our Rights, Our Responsibilities", which described the effects of welfare dependency on Cape York communities. The Queensland Government under Peter Beattie partnered with the group, was the first welfare reform trial aiming to end "passive welfare" and focus on social responsibility. The federal government became involved in the following year.

The CYP established a Families Responsibilities Commission to administer its programs, teaching financial literacy and savings plans. It also teaches the importance of education, and runs a scholarship program for remote and very remote Indigenous students, the Cape York Leaders Program (CYLP). It also has a focus on health and welfare of Cape York Aboriginal people, including housing. The organisation builds partnerships between Indigenous people and communities, government, and philanthropic and corporate entities.

In 2005, York wrote "The Cape York Agenda", which further developed his ideas laid out earlier, aimed at the "radical transformation" of the lives of Cape York people.

In 2025, the Cape York Partnership celebrated the 30th anniversary of "the journey from Noel Pearson's call for reform to a... movement that has reshaped welfare, education, health, jobs, and cultural renewal across Cape York and beyond".

=== Cape York Institute ===
The Cape York Institute for Policy and Leadership was launched as "Australia's first Indigenous land policy think tank" in 2004 by Pearson.

=== Good to Great Schools ===
Pearson founded Good to Great Schools Australia (GCSA), based in Cairns, around 2010. The Abbott government (2013–2015) provided A$22 million of funding, and by 2016, it had received A$37m in government funding. The Cape York Academy is a division of GCSA, which until November 2016 ran three academy schools (at Aurukun, Coen, and Hopevale) in partnership with the Queensland Education Department. After an investigation by the ABC into its business practices, GCSA withdrew support from the Aurukun school, leaving it to be run by the department. There were attempted break-ins, physical attacks on teachers, and a carjacking on the premises of Aurukun primary school in April 2016, leading to its closure for six weeks. A former teacher said that in his opinion, the method of US-style direct instruction taught there was not working; however, Pearson disputed this, saying that it was a law and order problem.

The University of Melbourne produced several government-funded reviews of the organisation's original literacy program. Its 2021 review, covering the previous three years, reported that there had been mixed results from the program, with some schools experiencing great success, while others did not. NAPLAN data showed that the average literacy in most schools had improved; however, it had declined in four schools, and some could not be determined. GCSA's program was applied at as many as 35 schools across the Northern Territory, Queensland, and Western Australia in 2017, and had received $31.55m of federal government funding between 2014 and 2020. However, by the end of 2020, only 8 schools were still using the program. The primary schools at Coen and Hopevale continue to be run as Cape York Aboriginal Australian Academy (CYAA) schools.

As of 2025 Pearson is co-chair and executive director of GCSA.

== Views ==
=== Support for The Intervention ===
On 18 June 2007, Pearson handed a paper containing his ideas for radical welfare reform in Cape York, called "From Hand Out to Hand Up", to Families and Community Services Minister Mal Brough. On 20 June, he argued for the necessity of intervention in relation to Aboriginal child sexual abuse. On 21 June, in response to a report entitled "Little Children are Sacred", prime minister John Howard declared that problems of child abuse in Northern Territory Aboriginal communities had reached a crisis point, and he initiated the "national emergency response", also known as "The Intervention". The response involved a series of interventions including, among other things, the suspension of the Racial Discrimination Act, compulsory management of Aboriginal people's income, the deployment of police and health workers, abolition of the permit system, compulsory acquisition of Aboriginal land, and a ban on alcohol. Pearson indicated qualified support for these measures, and received some criticism for doing so. On 18 July, the Indigenous Affairs Minister announced that the federal government would fund the welfare reform trials in Cape York recommended in "From Handout to Hand Up".

Pearson's position on the Intervention found both support and opposition from other Indigenous leaders and members of the Australian community. Marcia Langton supported Pearson's suggestions to shut down alcohol outlets and establish children's commissions and shelters in each community. Philip Martin, who had worked on the Welfare Reform Project in Aurukun for Pearson's Cape York Partnerships between November 2006 and May 2007, argued that Pearson's welfare reform approach cannot work unless other problems, such as inadequate policing and housing, were also addressed. In September 2007 NT Indigenous leader Galarrwuy Yunupingu, in a meeting with Mal Brough arranged by Pearson, changed his earlier position about the Intervention, and agreed with the measures. He agreed to set up a council of elders to advise the government on the course of the Intervention. However, in 2009 he reversed his position, saying that the Intervention had failed; it had not improved the lives of Aboriginal people.

Speaking in response to the Aurukun rape case involving a 10-year-old girl, Pearson said on 12 December 2007 that there should be no hesitation in taking Aboriginal children out of dysfunctional and dangerous family circumstances, which were not uncommon. He did not, however, support calls to extend the NT Intervention to Queensland.

=== Constitutional recognition ===
On 24 November 2007, the day of the Australian federal election, Pearson strongly criticised the opposition leader Kevin Rudd for reneging, two days before the election, on his commitment to seek constitutional recognition for Indigenous Australians. Rudd had initially pledged bipartisan support for John Howard's proposal, made on the first day of the election campaign, to pursue a referendum recognising Indigenous Australians, but later said that, should he win the election, he was unlikely to pursue the plan.

In April 2008, after attending the Australia 2020 Summit, Pearson argued that any proposed constitutional reform aimed at recognising Indigenous Australians must be in a form acceptable to a wide range of the Australian population, and that a "domestic agreement" would be preferable to a treaty between sovereign states.

In 2010, Pearson called for constitutional amendments in two areas, "one symbolic and the other substantive":

- An appropriate preamble [recognising Indigenous people in the Constitution]
- A new head of power, which provides constitutional authority for the proposed national agreement along the lines proposed in 1983 by the Makarrata Report of the Senate Legal and Constitutional Affairs Committee

In March 2021, Pearson spoke on the topic of constitutional recognition at the National Museum of Australia. In his address, he sums up the background and history of the proposal and urges a referendum on the matter, saying "Constitutional recognition of Indigenous Australians is not a project of "woke" identity politics. It is Australia's longest-standing and unresolved project for justice and inclusion".

=== "Wild rivers" debate ===
On 14 November 2007, it was reported that Pearson had accused the Queensland Government of Anna Bligh, and the federal Labor opposition led by Kevin Rudd, of "selling out" Aboriginal people, saying that their plan to prevent development of the Cape York region was a bid to gain The Greens preferences. Pearson argued that at the very moment when welfare reform was being attempted in Cape York, economic opportunities for the Aboriginal population would be "shot down" by such a move. In April 2009, Pearson stepped down from the directorship of the Cape York Institute, after objecting to legislation introduced by the Queensland Government declaring certain rivers on Indigenous land to be "wild rivers". He felt this legislation ran counter to the interests of the local Indigenous population, and wanted to concentrate on land rights issues, which had formerly been his major preoccupation.

=== Other issues ===
On 12 February 2008, the eve of Kevin Rudd's parliamentary Apology to the Stolen Generations, Pearson expressed that he held complex and conflicted views on the question of an apology.

Pearson argued in August 2008 that welfare benefits should not be granted to Indigenous Australians under the age of 21.

=== Politics ===
In January 2016, in an address to the National Press Club, Pearson said that there was a need for a new political movement bridging left and right politics in order to achieve real change for Indigenous people, giving South Australian independent politician Nick Xenophon as a good example of the "radical centre". He described Tony Abbott as his "closest friend", and (Liberal MP) Alan Tudge as a "co-fighter" in their cause. He also expressed regret that he had not chosen to run for Parliament himself, instead choosing to work outside of government.

== Publications ==
Pearson has published extensively, including books, essays, and newspaper articles.

In 2007, Pearson published White guilt, victimhood and the quest for a radical centre, a lengthy account of his understanding of the challenges of policy formulation and enactment.

In 2009 Pearson published a collection of his writings under the title Up from the Mission: Selected Writings as well as a Quarterly Essay titled Radical Hope: Education and equality in Australia.

In 2014, his essay "A Rightful Place: Race, recognition and a more complete commonwealth" was published as Quarterly Essay no. 55.

In late 2021, Mission: Essays, Speeches & Ideas, which includes 57 pieces by Pearson, of which 28 had appeared in The Australian between 1987 and 2021, was published by Black Inc. Topics include his public life, advocacy, and views that he has consistently held. In the essay titled "Mission", he reflects on his upbringing and early life, and his dedication to his community. The collection includes his well-known eulogy to Gough Whitlam, along with sections outlining his views, such as "The Radical Centre". He also advocates for a "universal job guarantee", provided through public programs, having observed the Morrison government's job subsidies during the COVID-19 pandemic, and having studied Modern Monetary Theory. The later group of essays, relating to the Uluru Statement, include well-argued reasons on the recognition of First Nations people in the Constitution.

== Recognition and controversy ==
Pearson has been honoured by invitations to be guest speaker or deliver addresses at numerous orations, including:

- Ben Chifley Memorial Lecture, 12 August 2000
- Charles Perkins Oration at the University of Sydney: "On the Human Right to Misery, Mass Incarceration and Early Death", 25 October 2001
- 5th Annual Hawke Lecture, Sunday 3 November 2002 ("The reward for public life is public progress")
- Sir Ninian Stephen Lecture at the Law School, University of Newcastle, 17 March 2003
- 2004 AMA Oration at the Australian Medical Association National Conference, 28 May 2004
- Whitlam Oration, 13 November 2013

He was one of six Indigenous people chosen to present the 1993 ABC Boyer Lecture, and was the sole presenter of the 2022 lecture.

In March 2022, Pearson, Megan Davis and Aunty Pat Anderson, accepted the 2021 Sydney Peace Prize, on behalf of all who had worked on the Uluru Statement from the Heart.

Aboriginal activist and scholar Gary Foley has published an extensive list of Pearson's talks and writings, which have been mostly published in the Murdoch press, on his Kooriweb website. Foley writes in the introduction "Noel Pearson is probably the most controversial Aboriginal voice in Australia today. Many Aboriginal leaders regard him with suspicion and consider him to be the leader of a new ultra-consrvative, right-wing tendency in the Aboriginal movement", but goes on to challenge students to examine Pearson's writings and seek their own interpretations. The National Museum of Australia website calls Pearson "one of Australia's most influential Indigenous lawyers and activists".

Pearson has been the subject of many appraisals and opinions. In 2022, James Blackwell, a research fellow in Indigenous diplomacy at Australian National University called him "a towering figure within the First Nations community, and one whose work has shaped decades of policy and debate on the issues most important to us and our communities: rights, land and justice", despite (Blackwell) being in disagreement with many of his political ideas and views on several topics.

Pearson has also been widely criticised. According to Australian public intellectual and academic Clive Hamilton in a scathing piece published in The Conversation in November 2016, Pearson does not have the support of most Indigenous Australians. Hamilton wrote that Pearson had recently "unleashed a volley of vituperation" against the ABC and has a habit of blaming anyone who does not share his vision. He also wrote that successive governments had poured money into his projects in Cape York, which had not been adequately scrutinised. Aboriginal advocate and filmmaker Jack Wilkie-Jans wrote in a 2015 Sydney Morning Herald opinion piece that Pearson's "social experiments" were not working. Amy McQuire, writing in the New Matilda in July 2015, said that large amounts of funding had been allocated to the Cape York Welfare Reform Trials by the government, with little scrutiny, while other Black organisations struggled, and the trials had not been successful.

== Personal life ==
In August 2012 Pearson revealed that he had undergone four months of chemotherapy for lymphatic cancer.

In May 2017, as part of a confidential legal settlement, The Guardian Australia issued an apology to Noel Pearson over a story they published in January 2017, which made defamatory claims relating to a quarry contract in Hope Vale in 2015.
