= Indigenous Voice to Parliament =

Proposed advisory body in Australia

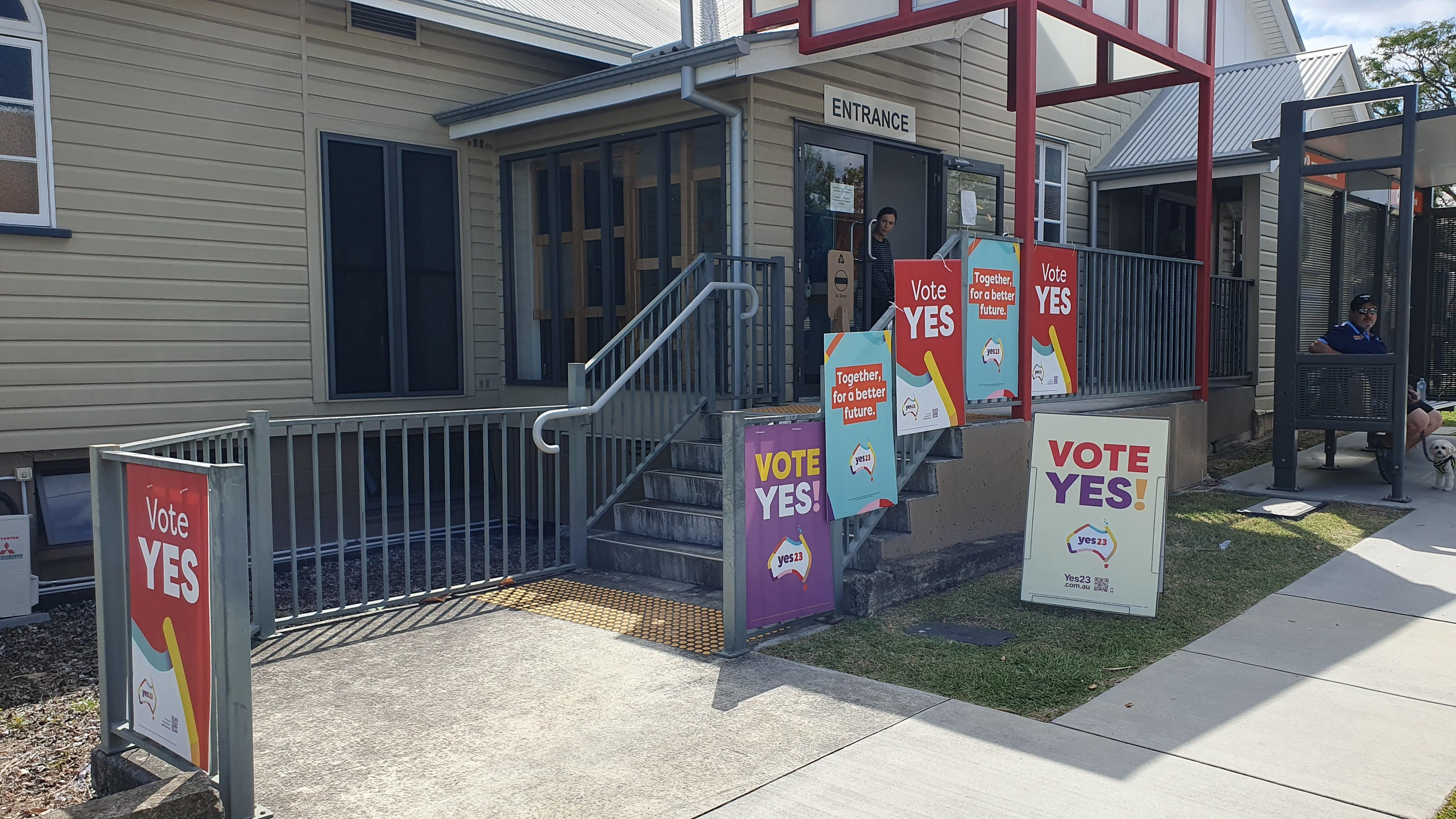
Polling booth in Brisbane on the day of the referendum

2023 Australian Indigenous Voice referendum by state or territory

The Aboriginal and Torres Strait Islander Voice, also known as the Indigenous Voice to Parliament, the First Nations Voice or simply the Voice, was a proposed Australian federal advisory body that would comprise Aboriginal and Torres Strait Islander people, intended to represent the views of Indigenous communities. The Voice as proposed by the Albanese government would have had the power to make representations to the Parliament of Australia and executive government on matters relating to Indigenous Australians. The specific form of the Voice was to be determined by legislation passed by Parliament had the referendum succeeded.

A referendum to amend the Australian Constitution to recognise Indigenous Australians in the document by prescribing the Voice was held on 14 October 2023. It was unsuccessful, with a majority of voters both nationwide and in all states voting against the proposal. The idea of such a body came to prominence after being endorsed by Indigenous leaders in the Uluru Statement from the Heart of 2017. While initially rejected by the then Coalition Turnbull government, the subsequent Labor Albanese government endorsed the proposal and promised to hold a referendum on the topic. Both Coalition parties in the federal opposition opposed the Voice however, whether legislatively or constitutionally implemented.

Under the government-endorsed design principles of the First Nations Referendum Working Group (Referendum Working Group or RWG), the membership of the Voice would have been selected by Aboriginal and Torres Strait Islander communities across the country, with an enforced gender balance at the national level. It remains legally possible for the Voice (or alternative proposals) to be introduced by legislation rather than by amendment to the Constitution; however, the current government stated before the referendum they would not legislate a Voice in the event of a No vote and have subsequently stuck to this position.

== Background ==
Indigenous Australians have long called for better representation, with William Cooper seeking in 1933 to petition King George V for the inclusion of a member of parliament to represent Indigenous people. In 1967, the first Indigenous referendum was held.

Prior to 1967, the federal government did not have the power to create laws specifically for Indigenous Australians, with section 51(xxvi) giving the Parliament the power to make laws with respect to "the people of any race, other than the aboriginal race in any State". This exclusion, along with another provision that prevented the counting of Indigenous Australians in the population for constitutional purposes, was removed following the 1967 referendum in which over 90% of Australians voted yes to the changes.

Additionally, since 1973 various Indigenous advisory bodies have been created in response to activist lobbying. Later in 1992, calls for the recognition of Indigenous Australians in the Constitution emerged in the context of the Keating Government's response to the Mabo decision.

=== Previous national Indigenous advisory bodies ===
==== Early proposals and advisory bodies ====
The creation of a federal advisory body with Indigenous members was proposed by the Aborigines Progressive Association (APA) in the 1930s. Following the Day of Mourning protests in 1938, an APA delegation met with Prime Minister Joseph Lyons and Interior Minister John McEwen. The list of ten policy demands drafted by APA leader Jack Patten included the creation of "an Advisory Board, consisting of six persons, three of whom at least should be of Aboriginal blood, to be nominated by the Aborigines Progressive Association".

The APA proposals were rejected by Lyons and McEwen on the grounds that the federal government had no constitutional power to implement them. The subsequent New Deal for Aborigines was drafted without direct reference to Indigenous people, with anthropologist Ernest Chinnery appointed in 1940 as the first Commonwealth Advisor on Native Affairs. At a 1967 referendum, a constitutional amendment was approved granting the federal government the power to make special laws for Indigenous Australians. Prime Minister Harold Holt subsequently announced the creation of the Council for Aboriginal Affairs (CAA) to advise the government on Indigenous policy. The CAA remained active until 1976, but none of its members – H. C. Coombs, Barrie Dexter and Bill Stanner – were Indigenous.

In 1972, the McMahon government organised the National Conference of Aboriginal and Torres Strait Islander Advisory Councillors in Canberra, consisting of 66 delegates from state and territory organisations. Peter Howson, minister responsible for the newly created Department of the Environment, Aborigines and the Arts, announced that the conference would be "a truly representative expression of Aboriginal views". The conference passed resolutions in support of the Aboriginal Tent Embassy and Indigenous land rights, both of which were contrary to government policy, but did not emerge as a standing advisory body.

Since 1973, there have been five national Indigenous bodies advising Australian governments. Four were elected and one (the National Indigenous Council) was appointed by the federal government. Other state and territory Indigenous advisory bodies have also been established in some jurisdictions since 2008.

==== 1973–1976: National Aboriginal Consultative Committee ====
The National Aboriginal Consultative Committee (NACC) was created in February 1973 by the Whitlam government's minister for Aboriginal Affairs, Gordon Bryant, with the help of Charles Perkins. Its principal function was to advise the Department of Aboriginal Affairs (DAA) and the minister on issues of concern to Aboriginal and Torres Strait Islander people. Its members were elected by Indigenous people, who had a turnout of 78% of the 36,338 people on its electoral roll, in November 1973. While it maintained a good relationship with Bryant, it had strong detractors in the DAA. The NACC saw itself as a legislative body, while the government expected them to be purely advisory, and this, along with other conflicts over the name, funding levels and control led to the end of the organisation. The Fraser government commissioned the 1976 Hiatt Committee review of the body, which concluded that it had not functioned as a consultative committee nor been effective in providing advice to government or making its activities known to most Aboriginal people.

==== 1977–1985: National Aboriginal Congress ====
The NACC was reconstituted in 1977 as the National Aboriginal Congress (NAC). Changes included a move to indirect voting of members through regional representatives, a lower budget and a more explicit advisory role. The Hawke government commissioned the Coombs Review into the NAC in 1983, which found that the body was not held in high regard by the Aboriginal community. After being starved of funds, the NAC was abolished by the Hawke government in 1985. In 1988, the Barunga Statement called for a new elected body to be created.

==== 1990–2005: Aboriginal and Torres Strait Islander Commission ====
The Aboriginal and Torres Strait Islander Commission (ATSIC) was established by the Hawke government on 5 March 1990 as an elected body which had responsibility for administering Indigenous programs and service delivery. It was successful in some areas as being a combined deliverer of services; however, low voter turnout for ATSIC elections, allegations of corruption and a lack of government support led to the demise of the organisation. A 2003 review recommended various changes, including more control of the organisation by Aboriginal and Torres Strait Islander people at a regional level. The Howard government (with Amanda Vanstone as Aboriginal Affairs minister) decided not to implement these changes however, instead abolishing ATSIC on 24 March 2005, with the support of the Labor party under Mark Latham.

==== 2004–2008: National Indigenous Council ====
In November 2004 the Howard government established the National Indigenous Council (NIC), following a proposal earlier in the year. A government inquiry into the demise of ATSIC recommended in March 2005 "that the NIC be a temporary body, to exist only until a proper national, elected representative body is in place". The same inquiry found that, although the members were respected, there was absolutely no support for the institution; only the government regarded it as legitimate. In early 2008, the NIC was disbanded.

==== 2009–2019: National Congress of Australia's First Peoples ====
In December 2008, the Rudd government asked the Australian Human Rights Commission to develop a new elected Indigenous representative body. This was announced as the National Congress of Australia's First Peoples in November 2009, and was established as a body independent of government. Fewer than 10,000 Indigenous people signed up as members to elect congress delegates, and the Abbott government cut off its main funding stream in 2013. It went into voluntary administration in June 2019, before ceasing completely in October 2019. Calls for a new voice came from the Cape York Institute, headed by Noel Pearson, in 2012 and 2015.

==== 2013–2019: Prime Minister's Indigenous Advisory Council ====
The government appointed Prime Minister's Indigenous Advisory Council was established by prime minister Tony Abbott on 25 September 2013. It consisted of 12 members, both Indigenous and non-Indigenous, who would meet three times each year. It was initially chaired by Warren Mundine. Prime minister Malcolm Turnbull restructured the body in early 2017, reducing its size to six members, and abolishing the role of chair. It was later given a pair of co-chairs. It held its last meeting in early 2019.

=== Constitutional recognition ===
The Keating government in 1993 passed the Native Title Act as a statutory recognition of native title. However, the government originally intended to pass that act as a part of a broader social and justice reform package, which would entail negotiations with Indigenous leaders to develop a mutually acceptable form of constitutional recognition. This did not eventuate however, with the Howard government coming to office in 1996.

==== Howard government (1996-2007) ====
During this Coalition government, the 1998 Australian Constitutional Convention, called to discuss whether or not Australia should become a republic, almost unanimously supported the proposal that a preamble containing a recognition of Indigenous Australians as the original inhabitants and custodians of Australia be inserted into the constitution. This, along with the convention's endorsement of an Australian Republic, was voted on in the 1999 referendum, with both questions being defeated. The first draft of the preamble voted on was written by Prime Minister John Howard, along with poet Les Murray, and was heavily criticised after being released. Indigenous leaders specifically objected to their failure to be consulted and the reference only to the prior occupancy of Indigenous peoples and not their continuing custodianship. A continuing lack of consultation in the creation of the final draft led to Indigenous leaders calling for the preamble question to be dropped. Debate on the preamble question was limited, with much of the focus on the other republic question and the question was eventually defeated, with only 39.34% of Australians voting yes.

The government otherwise opposed what it called "symbolic" recognition, until during the 2007 election campaign, Howard committed to hold a referendum on constitutional recognition. All subsequent prime ministers have endorsed this position; however no proposal prior to the Voice was taken to vote.

==== Rudd and Gillard governments ====
While the Rudd government also endorsed constitutional recognition, formal consultation with Indigenous leaders on a new proposal did not begin again until 2012 under the Gillard government. This resulted in the creation of an expert panel, which recommended, amongst other things, the insertion of a prohibition on racial discrimination. The report was not acted on by the government and was criticised by the opposition. Debate continued to stall for the remainder of Labor's time in office until 2014.

==== Kirribilli statement and Referendum Council ====
Incoming prime minister Tony Abbott was opposed to substantive constitutional change, arguing in his 2014 Neville Bonner oration that the goal is to "acknowledge Aboriginal people in the Constitution without otherwise changing it". However, in 2015 over 40 Indigenous leaders presented the Kirribilli Statement. It rejected non-substantive changes, stating:

A minimalist approach that provides recognition in the Constitution’s preamble, removes section 25 and moderates the race power section 51(xxvi) does not go far enough, and would not be acceptable to Aboriginal and Torres Strait Islander peoples.

This statement resulted in the creation of the bi-partisan creation of the Referendum Council by new prime minister Malcolm Turnbull.

== Development of a constitutional voice to Parliament ==
The proposal for a Voice to Parliament was initially conceived in 2014 by Aboriginal advocate Noel Pearson of the Cape York Institute (assisted by the Institute's senior constitutional advisor Shireen Morris) in discussion with academic Anne Twomey and constitutional conservatives Greg Craven, Damien Freeman and Julian Leeser. Their discussion arose in response to the 2012 recommendations of the Gillard Government's Expert Panel on Recognising Aboriginal and Torres Strait Islander Peoples in the Constitution, which had been rejected by constitutional conservatives. The proposal was first publicly raised by Pearson in his 2014 Quarterly Essay, "A Rightful Place: Race, Recognition and a More Complete Commonwealth" and was submitted by the Cape York Institute to the Joint Select Committee on Constitutional Recognition of Aboriginal and Torres Strait Islander Peoples in January 2015.

The proposal was made in part to bridge the gap between Indigenous advocates and constitutional conservatives in the debate around recognition. Indigenous advocates demanded more than just symbolic recognition in any change and had coalesced around a constitutional prohibition against racial discrimination. This reflected the view that, according to Megan Davis, Indigenous people do not seek inclusion in the Constitution to be recognised, that campaign being "a state-conceived project salvaged from the ashes of the failed 1999 referendum and arguably already achieved in 1967" but instead in order to "ameliorate the unintended (or intended) consequences of the drafting of the 1967 amendment" such as the continuing ability for the government to racially discriminate as seen in the Northern Territory Intervention and the Hindmarsh Island bridge controversy. A racial discrimination clause was unacceptable to constitutional conservatives however, who feared that such a clause would be widely interpreted by so called "activist judges" and unacceptably limit parliamentary sovereignty.

Arguing that conservative support was required for any referendum to succeed, the proposal envisioned a duty for Parliament to consult with Indigenous communities, but with no duty to follow this advice, thereby retaining parliamentary sovereignty. Additionally, it was argued that through the proposal being proactive, Indigenous people would be involved as "participants in Australia's democratic and parliamentary processes, rather than as litigants". The proposal was described as Pearson and Morris as a "third way" or "radical centrist" solution that synthesised progressive concerns that any constitutional recognition must involve structural reform and not "mere symbolism" with conservative concerns that any change must not limit parliamentary sovereignty and "minimise legal uncertainty".

While receiving broad academic support, some noted that if the design of the body is wholly left to Parliament, it may not have sufficient political power to negotiate with government and that the body may not be able to provide advice early enough to be effective.

=== Further developments under the Referendum Council ===
On 7 December 2015 the 16 members of the Referendum Council were appointed by Liberal prime minister Malcolm Turnbull and the ALP's Bill Shorten. In October 2016, the Council released the Discussion Paper on Constitutional Recognition of Aboriginal and Torres Strait Islander Peoples, which outlined the various proposals to date, including that of an Indigenous voice. The council then engaged in a consultation process with Indigenous Australians, eventually meeting with over 1,200 people. This led to the First Nations National Constitutional Convention on 26 May 2017, whose delegates collectively composed the Uluru Statement from the Heart. This statement included the request, "We call for the establishment of a First Nations Voice enshrined in the Constitution."

On 13 June 2017, the Referendum Council released their final report, which recommended that a referendum for a constitutional voice be held. It stated that the body would recognise Indigenous Australians as "the first peoples of Australia" and that it should be tasked with "monitoring the use of the heads of power in section 51(xxvi) and section 122".

In October 2017, the Turnbull government rejected the major recommendations of the report, arguing that the constitutional proposal was neither "desirable or capable of winning acceptance at referendum" and that the body "would inevitably become seen as a third chamber of parliament". Instead, the government established the Joint Select Committee on Constitutional Recognition relating to Aboriginal and Torres Strait Islander Peoples in March 2018. It was tasked with reviewing the findings of the Uluru Statement delegates, Referendum Council, and the two earlier constitutional recommendation bodies. Its final report, published in November 2018, included four recommendations, the first of which was to "initiate a process of co-design with Aboriginal and Torres Strait Islander peoples". It stated that the delegates at the 2017 Convention "understood that the primary purpose of The Voice was to ensure that Aboriginal and Torres Strait Islander voices were heard whenever the Commonwealth Parliament exercised its powers to make laws under section 51(xxvi) and section 122 of the Constitution".

==== Co-design of the Voice ====
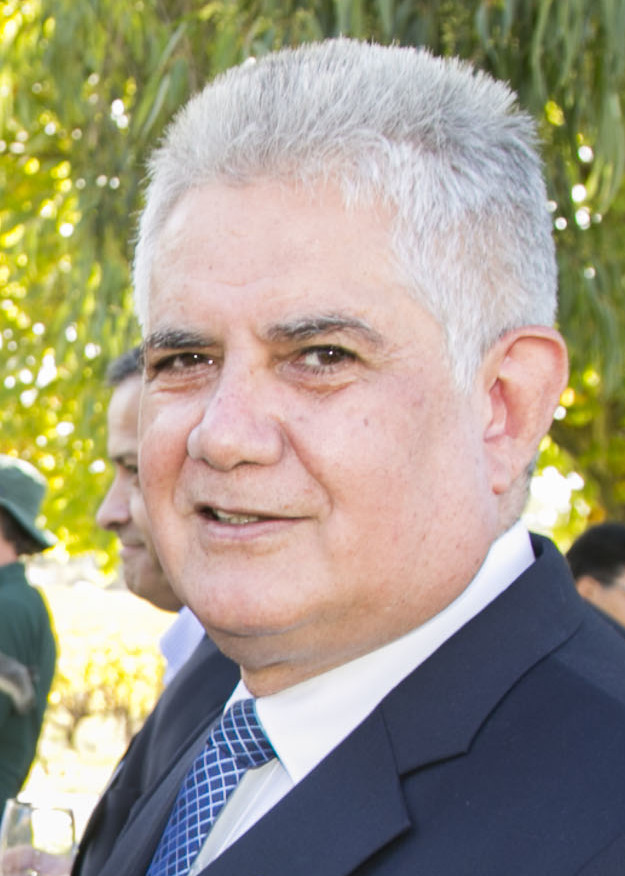
Ken Wyatt, Minister for Indigenous Affairs in the Morrison government

On 30 October 2019, Ken Wyatt, Minister for Indigenous Australians in the Morrison government, announced the commencement of a "co-design process" aimed at providing an Indigenous voice to government. A Senior Advisory Group (SAG) was co-chaired by Professor Tom Calma, chancellor of the University of Canberra, and Marcia Langton, associate provost at the University of Melbourne, and comprising 20 leaders and experts from across the country. The body was described as a "voice to government", rather than a "voice to parliament".

Prime Minister Scott Morrison rejected the proposal in the Uluru Statement for a voice to parliament to be put into the Australian Constitution; instead, in his government's model, the voice would be enshrined in legislation. The government also said it would run a referendum during its present term about recognising Indigenous people in the Constitution "should a consensus be reached and should it be likely to succeed".

==== 2021 Senior Advisory Group reports ====
An interim report by the Senior Advisory Group led by Langton and Calma was delivered to the government in November 2020, and officially published on 9 January 2021. It included proposals that the government would be obliged to consult the Voice prior to passing new legislation relating to race, native title or racial discrimination, where it would affect Indigenous Australians. However, the Voice would not be able to veto the enactment of such laws, or force changes to government policies. The Voice would comprise either 16 or 18 members, who would either be elected directly or come from the regional and local voice bodies. On the same day, Wyatt announced a second stage of co-design meetings lasting four months, involving more consultation with Indigenous people. Calma reported in March 2021 that about 25 to 35 regional groups would be created, with a mechanism for individuals to pass ideas up the chain from local to regional.

In July 2021 the Indigenous Voice Co-design Process panel released its final report. It proposed a series of Local and Regional voices, able to provide advice to all levels of government, and a National Voice, made up of a smaller number of members, able to provide advice to both Parliament and Government. The members of the National Voice would be chosen by the Local and Regional Voice for each area. The parliament would be "obliged" to consult the national voice on a limited number of matters that overwhelmingly affect Indigenous Australians and "expec[ted]" to consult the National Voice on other matters that "significantly affect" Indigenous Australians. The report did not cover changing the Constitution (as this was outside its terms of reference) and these bodies would be created via legislation rather than through a constitutional amendment. While the government announced that the report would be considered in Parliament as soon as possible, no legislation was passed by the election of May 2022.

=== Development under Labor government ===
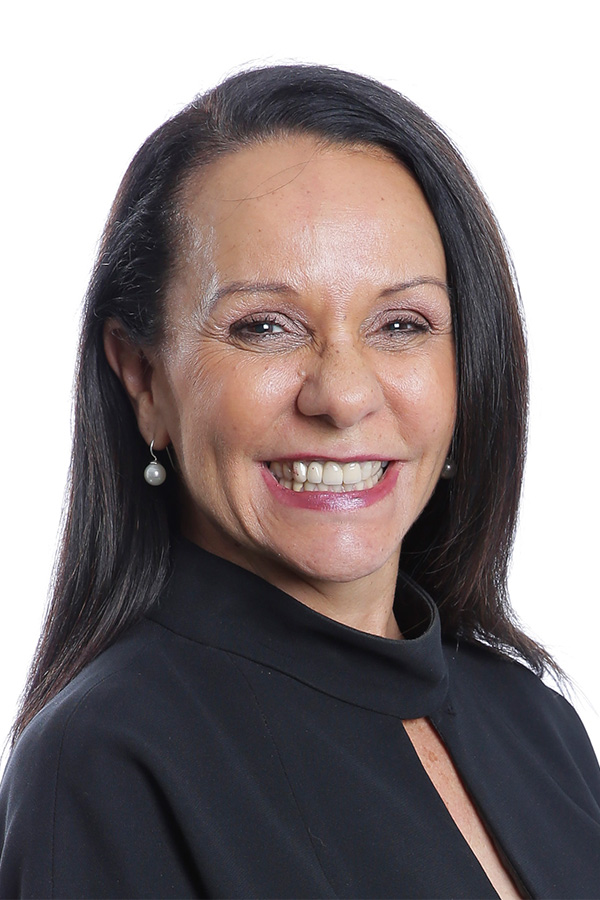
Linda Burney, Minister for Indigenous Australians in the Albanese government

In the May 2022 Australian federal election a Labor government was elected with Anthony Albanese becoming Prime Minister. In his victory speech, Albanese said that a referendum to decide the Indigenous Voice to Parliament would be held within his term of office, with Minister for Indigenous Australians Linda Burney overseeing the process.

At the Garma Festival of Traditional Cultures in July, Albanese spoke in more detail of the government's plans for a Voice to Parliament. He proposed the following three lines to the Constitution as a "starting point" in discussions about the amendment:

1. There shall be a body, to be called the Aboriginal and Torres Strait Islander Voice.
2. The Aboriginal and Torres Strait Islander Voice may make representations to Parliament and the Executive Government on matters relating to Aboriginal and Torres Strait Islander Peoples.
3. The Parliament shall, subject to this Constitution, have power to make laws with respect to the composition, functions, powers and procedures of the Aboriginal and Torres Strait Islander Voice.

He also proposed that the actioning referendum ask the question: "Do you support an alteration to the Constitution that establishes an Aboriginal and Torres Strait Islander Voice?"

On 23 March 2023, the Australian Government released a proposed question and amendment for consideration by the Australian Parliament, following advice from the Referendum Working Group.

== Structure and powers of the Voice ==
On 23 March 2023 the Australian Cabinet endorsed a set of design principles that would be used in the design of the Voice in the event the referendum is successful, with Prime Minister Anthony Albanese stating that these principles would "underpin the shape and function of the Voice". Additionally he stated that if the referendum is successful, another process would be established to work on the final design, with a subsequent government produced information pamphlet stating that this process would involve Indigenous Australian communities, the Parliament and the broader community, with any legislation going through normal parliamentary scrutiny procedures.

These principles stated that the Voice would be "proactive" and "independent" when giving advice to both Parliament and the government, Voice members would be chosen according to "the wishes of local communities" and "representative" being gender balanced and including remote and youth representatives. Additionally, the Voice would be "community-led, inclusive, respectful and culturally informed". Also, the Voice would be subject to standard transparency measures, would exist in addition to current organisations, would not deliver programs nor have a "veto power".

== Legislation and referendum ==
In the referendum, voters were presented with the following question for them to approve or disapprove. If the referendum was successful, the following proposed amendment would have been inserted into the constitution.

=== Question ===
The question that was put to the Australian people at the 2023 referendum was:

A Proposed Law: To alter the Constitution to recognise the First Peoples of Australia by establishing an Aboriginal and Torres Strait Islander Voice. Do you approve this proposed alteration?

=== Proposed amendment ===
The proposed amendment to be inserted into the Constitution was:

Chapter IX Recognition of Aboriginal and Torres Strait Islander Peoples

129 Aboriginal and Torres Strait Islander Voice

In recognition of Aboriginal and Torres Strait Islander peoples as the First Peoples of Australia:

1. There shall be a body, to be called the Aboriginal and Torres Strait Islander Voice;
2. The Aboriginal and Torres Strait Islander Voice may make representations to the Parliament and the Executive Government of the Commonwealth on matters relating to Aboriginal and Torres Strait Islander peoples;
3. The Parliament shall, subject to this Constitution, have power to make laws with respect to matters relating to the Aboriginal and Torres Strait Islander Voice, including its composition, functions, powers and procedures.

== Referendum preparation ==
The first meetings of the Referendum Working Group (RWG) and the Referendum Engagement Group (REG) were held in Canberra on 29 September 2022. The RWG, co-chaired by minister Linda Burney and special envoy Patrick Dodson, included a broad cross-section of representatives from First Nations communities across Australia. Their remit was to provide advice to the government on how best to ensure a successful referendum, focused on the key questions that need to be considered, including:

- The timing to conduct a successful referendum
- Refining the proposed constitutional amendment and question
- The information on the Voice necessary for a successful referendum

The RWG included Ken Wyatt, Tom Calma, Marcia Langton, Megan Davis, Jackie Huggins, Noel Pearson, Pat Turner, Galarrwuy Yunupingu, Aboriginal and Torres Strait Islander Social Justice Commissioner June Oscar, and a number of other respected leaders and community members. The REG included those on the RWG as well as other Aboriginal and Torres Strait Islander representatives from across the country, including land councils, local governments and community-controlled organisations. Mick Gooda, Kado Muir, and Hannah McGlade were included in this larger group. They provided advice on building community understanding, awareness and support for the referendum.

On 28 December 2022 at the Woodford Folk Festival, the prime minister said that the referendum would be held within a year, with the date eventually set for 14 October 2023. An official pamphlet, containing details of the proposed change to the constitution and two essays written by the yes and no campaigns, was posted to every household before the vote and was also available on the Australian Electoral Commission website.

== Legal commentary ==
Former High Court Justice Ian Callinan

Legal opinion in Australia was divided over the suitability of the wording of the proposed constitutional amendment.

=== Concerns ===
One sticking point among experts was the inclusion of the phrase "executive government". In Australia, "executive government" comprises ministers as well as the departments they oversee. It is a broad term, which covers a wide range of people from the governor-general to the cabinet and public servants. Opponents argued that it makes it possible that the whole of the federal government, including its agencies, would be under an obligation to consult the Voice, and that the wording could allow judges to make rulings about its nature. Anne Twomey argued that there is no such obligation in the proposal, and that past High Court rulings have found that the term extends to ministers and government departments, but not statutory bodies, which are distinct legal entities. Noel Pearson also stressed the importance of talking to the public service as well as politicians in effecting change.

On 3 April 2023, shadow attorney-general Julian Leeser outlined his concerns about the words "executive government" in proposed sub-clause 129(ii) during an address at the National Press Club, namely that the meaning of the words is unclear and may be interpreted by the High Court in a way unexpected and unable to be modified later by legislation. He also expressed concerns with the preambular statement "In recognition of Aboriginal and Torres Strait Islander Peoples as the First Peoples of Australia:" as its judicial interpretation is unclear. However, despite these concerns, Leeser stated he would vote yes and continued to campaign for a successful referendum, after resigning from shadow cabinet.

Some constitutional law academics and judges voiced concerns about the introductory words to the proposed new section 129. Retired superior court judges, including David Jackson, Nicholas Hasluck, and Terry Cole, suggested that the changes could have unintended effects and would introduce inequality of citizenship into the Constitution. Former High Court Justice Ian Callinan had said that the changes were legally unsafe.

In May 2023 constitutional law professors Nicholas Aroney and Peter Gerangelos highlighted what they believed were a number of issues with the proposed constitutional amendment in a submission to the Joint Select Committee, suggesting that the Voice may be seen by the High Court as having a similar constitutional status as the Parliament, executive and the High Court. In October 2023 a paper by Aroney and lawyer Peter Congdon highlighted that the proposed alteration to the Constitution had the potential to significantly expand the powers of the Commonwealth over the states, citing the examples of raising the age of criminal responsibility to reduce rates of Indigenous incarceration, or legislating land management issues affecting farmers and Indigenous people. They wrote that neither side had mentioned this issue.

Vice-president of the Rule of Law Institute of Australia Chris Merritt suggested that the proposal would "clearly restrict the sovereign power of the Commonwealth in a way that nobody has even considered".

=== Support for the proposed wording ===
The Constitutional Expert Group appointed by the government to provide advice about constitutional law relating to the Voice (comprising Greg Craven, Megan Davis, Kenneth Hayne, Noel Pearson, Cheryl Saunders, Anne Twomey, George Williams, and Asmi Wood) were unanimous in their opinion that the Voice would not have veto powers over legislation. Other constitutional experts backed the proposal as a "safe and sensible" legal option. Former High Court judge Kenneth Hayne wrote that the Voice would not obstruct the government's function. George Williams, law professor at the University of New South Wales agreed, calling the proposal a modest one. The Law Council of Australia supported the model, calling it a "modest step".

The Solicitor-General of Australia Stephen Donaghue advised that the Voice would "not fetter or impede the exercise of existing powers of Parliament... and is not just compatible with the system of representative and responsible government prescribed by the Constitution, but an enhancement of that system". He also advised that the Voice would help in "overcoming barriers that have historically impeded effective participation by Aboriginal and Torres Strait Islander peoples in political discussions and decisions that affect them" and would also "rectify a distortion in the existing system".

In early October 2023, 71 constitutional and public law teachers and professors published an open letter to the Australian public, stating that:

Certainly it is impossible to predict exactly what the High Court might say in the future; this is the case for all constitutional and legal provisions. But we know that the vast majority of expert legal opinion agrees that this amendment is not constitutionally risky.

Former Chief Justice of Australia, Robert French, criticised the No campaign's legal arguments and other campaign tactics in a speech at the National Press Club, refuting the argument that it would have an effect on executive decision-making. He also said that the Voice would be unable to "[engage] effectively in terms of representation with the processes of government unless you have the executive government in there", and that this was not a mistake.

== Stances and opinions ==
=== Political parties ===
The Anthony Albanese led Labor government supported the Voice, arguing in the official Yes referendum pamphlet that the Voice will recognise Indigenous Australians in the constitution in the way they requested, improve government decision making through listening to advice on matters that affect Indigenous Australian lives, and make practical progress in closing the gap.

Both the Liberal and National parties, however, opposed the voice, arguing in the official No referendum pamphlet that the Voice is legally risky, divisive and far too broad in its scope. Peter Dutton instead argued for a more symbolic inclusion change in the Constitution as a form of recognition, with local and regional voices to be legislated (without a national Voice). However, the leader of the Nationals, David Littleproud, indicated that his party did not support this legislated regional and local voices model either, creating doubts as to whether this policy could be enacted if the Coalition gained government. Following the defeat of the proposal, Dutton stated that his party's prior commitment to symbolic constitutional recognition would be reviewed and that "it's clear the Australian public is probably over the referendum process for some time".

=== Public opinion ===
Opinion polling on whether to change the Australian Constitution to establish an Indigenous Voice has been conducted since 2017, when Aboriginal and Torres Strait Islander leaders petitioned for such an amendment as part of the Uluru Statement from the Heart. The number of these polls conducted grew substantially following Labor's victory in the 2022 federal election; the party had committed to holding the referendum required for this constitutional change in its first term of government.

At least ten firms polled Australians on the proposed amendment, greater than the number who have polled party support for any previous Australian election. Some firms were commissioned by media organisations, think tanks, advocacy groups or university foundations. Other firms self-initiated their polls for market research or strategic communications purposes. Considering methodologies, polls were almost exclusively conducted online, with only one firm using SMS. Pollsters differed on whether to give a forced-choice question, as is done in actual Australian referendums, or allow respondents to express indecision or lack of knowledge. Some pollsters also used Likert-style questions to allow respondents to express how strong their opinion is.

The Australian Constitution requires a proposed amendment to attain a double majority in the referendum – not only a majority of votes nationwide, but also a majority in at least four of the six states. Because of this requirement, the level of support in each state was of special interest. One way pollsters investigated state-level support was to break down results from national polls. However, these polls sometimes did not survey enough people from each state to give reliable results about state-level support, especially for smaller states like Tasmania and South Australia. Another way pollsters investigated was by specifically surveying people from a particular state.

Pollsters also often broke down their results by age, gender, and party affiliation. The last was of particular interest because bipartisan support is often considered necessary for an Australian referendum to pass, though it is not a formal requirement.

The extent of support for the Voice among Aboriginal and Torres Strait Islander Australians was a key point of discussion. All publicly available polling indicated absolute majorities among this group favouring the Voice. Important caveats include the small sample size associated with certain polls, the length of time elapsed since the polls were conducted, and the lack of publicly available results and methodologies for certain polls.

== See also ==
- Assembly of First Nations (Canada)
- Australian Aboriginal sovereignty
- Australian Aboriginal Progressive Association, the first Aboriginal activist organisation
- Bureau of Indian Affairs (United States)
- Australian state and territory Indigenous voices
  - First Nations Voice to Parliament (South Australia), the first state Voice
- Indigenous treaties in Australia
- Māori politics, in New Zealand
  - Māori electorates
  - Māori wards and constituencies
  - New Zealand Māori Council
  - Te Puni Kōkiri
- National Commission on Indigenous Peoples, body representing indigenous groups in the Philippines
- Sámi parliament (disambiguation), several bodies representing Sámi peoples in the Nordic countries and Russia
- List of Indigenous Australian politicians
- List of Indigenous Australians in politics and public service

== Sources ==
- Members of Parliament (18 July 2023). "Your Official Yes/No Referendum Pamphlet" (PDF). Australian Electoral Commission.
