= Sugar Ray (disambiguation) =

Sugar Ray is an American alternative rock band.

Sugar Ray may also refer to:

== Music ==
- Sugar Ray (album), Sugar Ray's 2001 self-titled album
- Sugar Ray Norcia (born 1954), an American musician best known for his work with his backing band The Bluetones
- Sugaray Rayford (born 1969), an American soul blues singer and songwriter

== Boxing ==
- Sugar Ray Robinson (1921–1989), American boxer often cited as the greatest of all time
- Sugar Ray Leonard (born 1956), American boxer declared the "Boxer of the Decade" for the 1980s
- Sugar Ray Seales (born 1952), American boxer and 1972 Olympic champion

== Other ==
- "Sugar" Ray Emery (1982–2018), Canadian hockey goaltender
- Sugar Ray Lloyd, another ring name of Glacier (wrestler), professional wrestler Raymond M. Lloyd (born 1964)
- Sugar Ray Marimón (born 1988), Colombian baseball pitcher
- Micheal "Sugar" Ray Richardson (born 1955), American former National Basketball Association player and former professional basketball head coach
- Ray 'Sugar Ray' Robinson, Australian indigenous political leader
- "Sugar" Ray Hall (basketball) (born 1962), American basketball player
