= OIPC =

OIPC may refer to:

- Office of Indigenous Policy Coordination, in Australia
- Office of the Information and Privacy Commissioner, in Canadian privacy law
- Organisation internationale de police criminelle
