= Aboriginal and Torres Strait Islander Services =

Aboriginal and Torres Strait Islander Services was part of the now disbanded Aboriginal and Torres Strait Islander Commission (ATSIC).

It was responsible for service provision under Australian government programs for Indigenous Australians. The services it provided were transferred to a number of other government departments.

Aboriginal and Torres Strait Islanders Services came under fire from the media in 2004 when its benefactor, the CEO of ATSIC, Geoff Clark, faced rape allegations.

== See also ==
Office of Indigenous Policy Coordination
