= CYI =

CYI may refer to:

- Cape York Institute, an Australian think tank
- Chhayapuri railway station (Indian Railways station code: CYI), a railway station in Gujarat, India
- Chiayi Airport (IATA: CYI), an airport in Shuishang Township, Chiayi County, Taiwan
