= Gatjil Djerrkura =

Aboriginal leader and indigenous spokesman

Donald Gatjil Djerrkura OAM (Yolŋu Matha:Gätjil Djerrkura) (1949 – 26 May 2004) was an Aboriginal Australian leader and Indigenous spokesman in the Northern Territory and Australia.

== Early life and education ==
Gätjil Djerrkura was born in Yirrkala, in Arnhem Land, Northern Territory, in 1949.

He attended school at the Yirrkala Mission School and later attended bible college in Brisbane. He was given the English name "Donald".

== Career ==
Djerrkura was a senior elder of the Wangurri clan of the Yolngu people. He was responsible for a number of traditional and ceremonial activities on behalf of his clan and the East Arnhem Land/Yirrkala Aboriginal community.

He was appointed to the role of chairperson of the Aboriginal and Torres Strait Islander Commission (ATSIC) on 6 December 1996 and held it until 2000. In this role he advocated for Australia to become a republic and for Constitutional recognition of Indigenous Australians. In so doing, he was a core part of the republican movement in Australia and he led the push for the addition of a new preamble to the Constitution of Australia which recognised to original and continuing custodianship of Aboriginal and Torres Strait Islander peoples; this was ultimately included in the 1999 Australian republic referendum.

=== Positions ===
- Chairman of the Batchelor College Council, NT
- Director of the Board of the Indigenous Land Corporation
- Director of the Board of the Land Enterprise Australia
- Member of the Council for Aboriginal reconciliation
- General Manager of Yirrkala Business Enterprises in Nhulunbuy
- Chairperson of the Aboriginal and Torres Strait Islander Commercial Development Corporation
- Director of the Henry Walker Group

== Publications ==
- At the Crossroads : Native Title, Economic Development and their Impact on Reconciliation. South Australia : Kaurna Higher Education Centre. Aboriginal Studies Centre. University of South Australia, 1997. (essay)

== Recognition and honours ==
On Australia Day 1984 Djerrkura was awarded the Medal of the Order of Australia (OAM) in recognition of service to Aboriginal welfare.

On 1 January 2001 he received a Centenary Medal, for service to Australian society through the Aboriginal and Torres Strait Islander Commission.

== Death and legacy ==
Djerrkura died on 26 May 2004.

His son Nathan Djerrkura played for Geelong and the Western Bulldogs in the Australian Football League.

Djerrkura's oral history, recorded 18 July 2000 with Peter Read, is available at the National Library of Australia.
