= Minister for Indigenous Australians =

Australian government minister

- Commonwealth Coat of Arms

- Flag of Australia

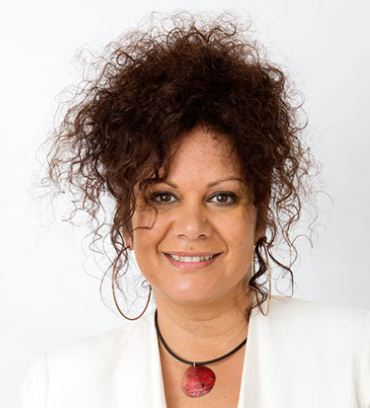
- Incumbent; Malarndirri McCarthy since 29 July 2024
- Department of the Prime Minister and Cabinet
- Style: The Honourable
- Appointer: Governor-General on the recommendation of the Prime Minister of Australia
- Inaugural holder: Peter Howson (as Minister for the Environment, Aborigines and the Arts)
- Formation: 10 March 1971
- Website: ministers.pmc.gov.au/mccarthy

The Minister for Indigenous Australians in the Government of Australia is a position which holds responsibility for affairs affecting Indigenous Australians. Previous ministers have held various other titles since the position was created in 1968, most recently Minister for Indigenous Affairs. Since July 2024, the position has been held by Malarndirri McCarthy in the Albanese ministry.

McCarthy is the second Indigenous woman and third Indigenous Australian appointed to the role. Her predecessor, Linda Burney, was the first Indigenous woman to be appointed to the role. Burney's predecessor, Ken Wyatt, was the first Indigenous Australian appointed to the role, and the first minister named as Minister for Indigenous Australians.

The role assumes responsibility for matters concerning Aboriginal and Torres Strait Islander people in Australia, and is responsible for the National Indigenous Australians Agency.

== Portfolio ==
In the Government of Australia, the Minister administers the portfolio through the Department of the Prime Minister and Cabinet and a range of other government agencies, including:

- Office of Indigenous Policy Coordination (OIPC)
  - Indigenous Coordination Centres
- Office of the Registrar of Indigenous Corporations (ORIC)
- Torres Strait Regional Authority (TSRA)
- Indigenous Land and Sea Corporation (ILC)
- Office of the Aboriginal Land Commissioner
- Anindilyakawa Land Council
- Central Land Council
- Northern Land Council
- Tiwi Land Council

== List of ministers ==
=== Indigenous Australians ===
The following individuals have been appointed as Minister for Indigenous Australians, or any precedent titles:

Order	Minister	Party affiliation	Prime Minister	Ministerial title	Term start	Term end	Term in office
1	Bill Wentworth	Liberal	Gorton	Minister in charge of Aboriginal Affairs under the Prime Minister	28 February 1968	10 March 1971	3 years, 92 days
1	Bill Wentworth	Liberal	McMahon	Minister in charge of Aboriginal Affairs under the Prime Minister	10 March 1971	31 May 1971	3 years, 92 days
2	Peter Howson	Liberal	McMahon	Minister for the Environment, Aborigines and the Arts	31 May 1971	5 December 1972	1 year, 188 days
3	Gough Whitlam^{1}	Labor	Whitlam	Minister for the Environment, Aborigines and the Arts	5 December 1972	19 December 1972	14 days
4	Gordon Bryant	Labor	Whitlam	Minister for Aboriginal Affairs	19 December 1972	9 October 1973	294 days
5	Jim Cavanagh	Labor	Whitlam	Minister for Aboriginal Affairs	9 October 1973	6 June 1975	1 year, 240 days
6	Les Johnson	Labor	Whitlam	Minister for Aboriginal Affairs	6 June 1975	11 November 1975	158 days
7	Tom Drake-Brockman	National Country	Fraser	Minister for Aboriginal Affairs	11 November 1975	22 December 1975	41 days
8	Ian Viner	Liberal	Fraser	Minister for Aboriginal Affairs	22 December 1975	5 December 1978	2 years, 348 days
9	Fred Chaney	Liberal	Fraser	Minister for Aboriginal Affairs	5 December 1978	3 November 1980	1 year, 334 days
10	Peter Baume	Liberal	Fraser	Minister for Aboriginal Affairs	3 November 1980	7 May 1982	1 year, 185 days
11	Ian Wilson	Liberal	Fraser	Minister for Aboriginal Affairs	7 May 1982	11 March 1983	308 days
12	Clyde Holding	Labor	Hawke	Minister for Aboriginal Affairs	11 March 1983	24 July 1987	4 years, 135 days
13	Gerry Hand	Labor	Hawke	Minister for Aboriginal Affairs	24 July 1987	4 April 1990	2 years, 254 days
14	Robert Tickner	Labor	Hawke	Minister for Aboriginal Affairs	4 April 1990	19 December 1991	5 years, 342 days
14	Robert Tickner	Labor	Hawke	Minister for Aboriginal and Torres Strait Islander Affairs	19 December 1991	20 December 1991	5 years, 342 days
14	Robert Tickner	Labor	Keating	Minister for Aboriginal and Torres Strait Islander Affairs	20 December 1991	11 March 1996	5 years, 342 days
15	John Herron	Liberal	Howard	Minister for Aboriginal and Torres Strait Islander Affairs	11 March 1996	30 January 2001	4 years, 325 days
16	Philip Ruddock	Liberal	Howard	Minister for Reconciliation and Aboriginal and Torres Strait Islander Affairs	30 January 2001	26 November 2001	2 years, 250 days
16	Philip Ruddock	Liberal	Howard	Minister for Immigration and Multicultural and Indigenous Affairs	26 November 2001	7 October 2003	2 years, 250 days
17	Amanda Vanstone	Liberal	Howard	Minister for Immigration and Multicultural and Indigenous Affairs	7 October 2003	27 January 2006	2 years, 112 days
18	Mal Brough	Liberal	Howard	Minister for Families and Community Services and Indigenous Affairs	27 January 2006	3 December 2007	1 year, 310 days
19	Jenny Macklin	Labor	Rudd	Minister for Families, Housing, Community Services and Indigenous Affairs	3 December 2007	24 June 2010	5 years, 289 days
19	Jenny Macklin	Labor	Gillard	Minister for Families, Housing, Community Services and Indigenous Affairs	24 June 2010	14 December 2011	5 years, 289 days
19	Jenny Macklin	Labor	Gillard	Minister for Families, Community Services and Indigenous Affairs	24 June 2010	27 June 2013	5 years, 289 days
19	Jenny Macklin	Labor	Rudd	Minister for Families, Community Services and Indigenous Affairs	27 June 2013	18 September 2013	5 years, 289 days
20	Nigel Scullion	National	Abbott	Minister for Indigenous Affairs	18 September 2013	15 September 2015	5 years, 253 days
20	Nigel Scullion	National	Turnbull	Minister for Indigenous Affairs	15 September 2015	24 August 2018	5 years, 253 days
20	Nigel Scullion	National	Morrison	Minister for Indigenous Affairs	24 August 2018	29 May 2019	5 years, 253 days
21	Ken Wyatt	Liberal	Morrison	Minister for Indigenous Australians	29 May 2019	23 May 2022	2 years, 359 days
22	Linda Burney	Labor	Albanese	Minister for Indigenous Australians	1 June 2022	29 July 2024	2 years, 58 days
23	Malarndirri McCarthy	Labor	Albanese	Minister for Indigenous Australians	29 July 2024	Incumbent	2 years, 40 days

Notes

^{1} Whitlam was one of a two-man ministry consisting of himself and Lance Barnard for two weeks until the full ministry was announced.

=== Former ministerial titles ===
==== Reconciliation ====
Order	Minister	Party	Prime Minister	Title	Term start	Term end	Term in office
1	Philip Ruddock	Liberal	Howard	Minister assisting the Prime Minister for Reconciliation	21 October 1998	30 January 2001	4 years, 351 days
1	Philip Ruddock	Liberal	Howard	Minister for Reconciliation and Aboriginal and Torres Strait Islander Affairs	30 January 2001	26 November 2001	4 years, 351 days
1	Philip Ruddock	Liberal	Howard	Minister Assisting the Prime Minister for Reconciliation	26 November 2001	7 October 2003	4 years, 351 days
2	Amanda Vanstone	Liberal	Howard	Minister Assisting the Prime Minister for Reconciliation	7 October 2003	22 October 2004	1 year, 15 days

==== Indigenous Employment and Economic Development ====
Order	Minister	Party	Prime Minister	Title	Term start	Term end	Term in office
1	Mark Arbib	Labor	Gillard	Minister for Indigenous Employment and Economic Development	14 September 2010	14 December 2011	1 year, 91 days
2	Julie Collins	Labor	Gillard	Minister for Indigenous Employment and Economic Development	14 December 2011	18 September 2013	1 year, 278 days

==== Indigenous health ====
The following individuals have been appointed as Assistant Minister for Indigenous Health, or any of its precedent titles:

Order	Minister	Party	Prime Minister	Title	Term start	Term end	Term in office
1	Warren Snowdon	Labor	Rudd	Minister for Indigenous Health, Rural and Regional Health and Regional Services Delivery	9 June 2009	24 June 2010	4 years, 101 days
1	Warren Snowdon	Labor	Gillard	Minister for Indigenous Health, Rural and Regional Health and Regional Services Delivery	24 June 2010	14 September 2010	4 years, 101 days
1	Warren Snowdon	Labor	Gillard	Minister for Indigenous Health	14 September 2010	27 June 2013	4 years, 101 days
1	Warren Snowdon	Labor	Rudd	Minister for Indigenous Health	27 June 2013	18 September 2013	4 years, 101 days
2	Ken Wyatt	Liberal	Turnbull; Morrison	Minister for Indigenous Health	24 January 2017	29 May 2019	2 years, 125 days
3	Malarndirri McCarthy	Labor	Albanese	Assistant Minister for Indigenous Health	1 June 2022	29 July 2024	2 years, 58 days
4	Ged Kearney	Labor	Albanese	Assistant Minister for Indigenous Health	29 July 2024	13 May 2025	288 days
5	Rebecca White	Labor	Albanese	Assistant Minister for Indigenous Health	13 May 2025	Incumbent	1 year, 117 days
