= Geoff Clark (politician) =

Australian Aboriginal activist (born 1952)

Personal details
- Born: 1 August 1952 (age 74)

Geoff Clark (born 1 August 1952) is an Australian Aboriginal politician and activist. Clark led the Aboriginal and Torres Strait Islander Commission (ATSIC) from 1999 until it was disbanded in 2004.

== Early life ==
Clark was born on 1 August 1952 and raised by his grandmother, Alice, in an Aboriginal community in western Victoria.

He was a keen boxer, boxing in Jimmy Sharman's tent when it came to Warrnambool. Aged 20, Clark moved to Western Australia and, until he was 26 worked as a builder's labourer and gardener. He also played Australian rules football for West Australian Football League clubs Claremont and Subiaco. Clark also represented Norwood Football Club in the South Australian National Football League for three games in 1978.

== Political career ==
In 1979, Clark became the administrator for the Framlingham Aboriginal Community Trust. He co-founded the Aboriginal Provisional Government in 1983. Between 1983 and 1996, he was active locally and internationally in indigenous affairs.

In December 1996, Clark was elected to the Aboriginal and Torres Strait Islander Commission (ATSIC) board as the native title spokesman. In December 1999, he became the first chairperson of ATSIC to be elected to that position. He served two terms in that position before the organisation was disbanded in 2004. Clark's tenure was increasingly overshadowed by allegations of misconduct and ongoing criminal proceedings against him.

In August 2003, Clark was suspended as ATSIC chairperson by the Indigenous Affairs Minister, Amanda Vanstone. The suspension was later overturned in court. In 2004, the Howard government abolished ATSIC.

== Court proceedings ==
In 2000, Clark was charged with the 1981 rape of his cousin, Joanne McGuinness, but a magistrate found there was insufficient evidence to bring the case to trial.

In 2001, press reports in The Age claimed that Clark was responsible for four rapes that took place in the 1970s and 1980s. In 2002, McGuiness and Carol Stingel launched separate civil cases against him.

In 2003, it emerged that ATSIC had agreed to allocate $45,000 to fund Clark's legal defence relating to a pub brawl at which he was present. Nineteen charges were initially filed, with all but "riotous behaviour" and "obstructing police" being eventually dropped. Clark was convicted on both at his first trial, with the riotous behaviour charge later dismissed on appeal.

In January 2007, a County Court civil jury found that Clark had led two pack rapes in 1971. The victim, Carol Anne Stingel, who suffered from post-traumatic stress disorder, was awarded $20,000 in compensatory damages and around $71,000 to cover legal costs.

In February 2007, Clark appealed against the findings of the jury in the Stingel matter. His notice of appeal alleged the verdict was "perverse", that the trial judge misdirected the jury regarding failures to call corroborative witnesses on the part of the complainant, that the trial judge erred in ruling against the admission of certain evidence, and that the fairness of the trial process had been compromised by pre-trial publicity. In December 2007 he lost his appeal against the damages awarded against him. Clark never paid the $20,000 compensation to Stingel and, as of 2013, owed more than $300,000 to her lawyers. Although Clark declared bankruptcy in 2009, which was extended by five years in June 2012, he made an unsuccessful $1.25 million bid in June 2013 for a hotel in Warrnambool.

In September 2011, Clark was one of the successful complainants in a racial discrimination case involving Herald Sun columnist Andrew Bolt who, in a 2009 article, claimed that Clark had used his "part Aboriginal ethnicity" to gain social benefits. Clark said he took part in the action because of the general tone of Bolt's writing. In Eatock v Bolt, the Federal Court of Australia held that two articles written by Bolt and published in the Herald Sun had contravened section 18C of the Racial Discrimination Act 1975.

In August 2021, Clark was ordered to stand trial relating to the alleged misappropriation of about $2 million belonging to the Framlingham Aboriginal Trust over a period of around 30 years, along with his wife Trudy and son Jeremy.

In September 2024, after three lengthy County Court trials, Clarke was found guilty of stealing almost $1m from three indigenous organisations over 15 years, taking illegal royalties from eel fishermen, and lying in affidavits. A fourth charge, of stealing from the Department of Families, Community Services and Indigenous Affairs, was dropped. He was convicted to six years and 2 months behind bars.

== See also ==
- Ray Robinson (ATSIC)
