= Ninian Stephen =

Australian jurist and former Governor-General (1923–2017)

The Right Honourable Sir Ninian Stephen KG AK GCMG GCVO KBE QC
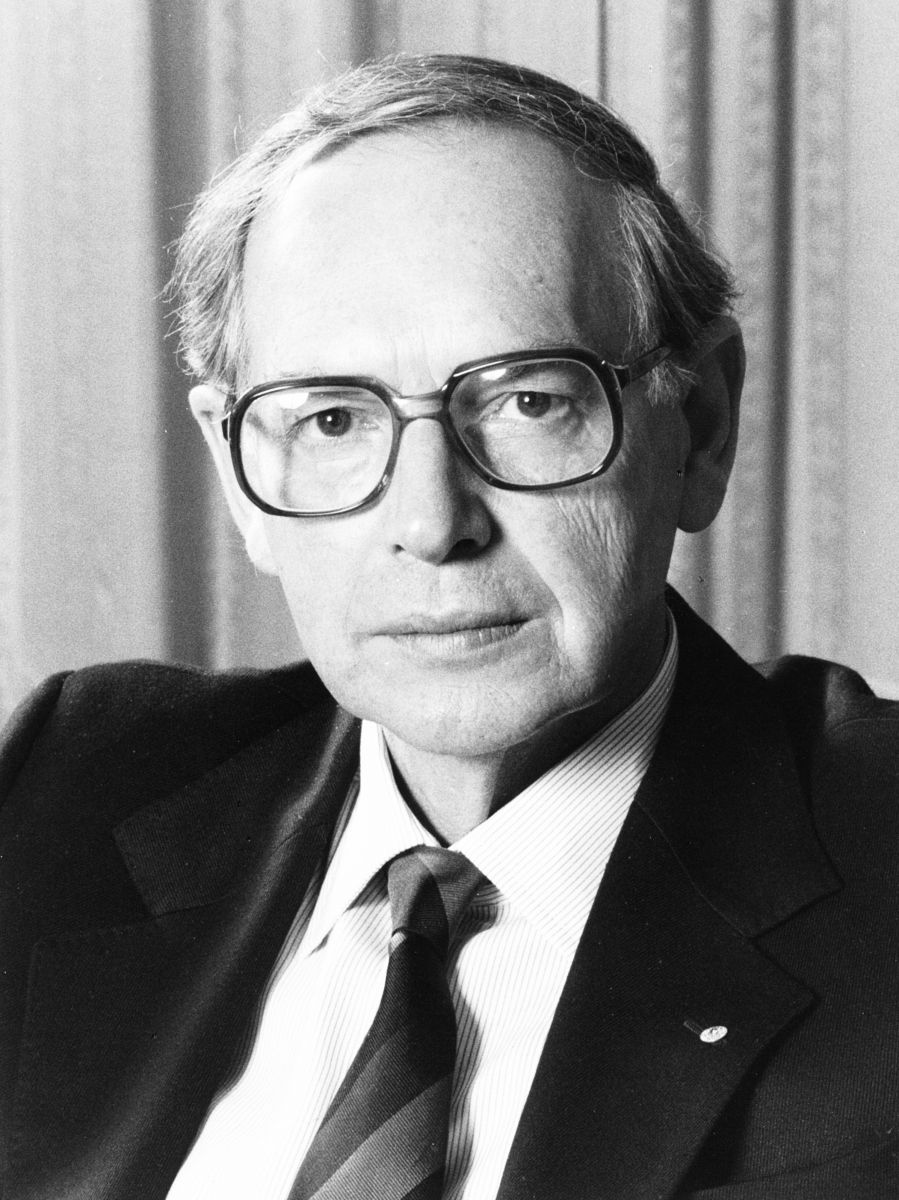

20th Governor-General of Australia
- In office 29 July 1982 – 16 February 1989
- Monarch: Elizabeth II
- Prime Minister: Malcolm Fraser; Bob Hawke
- Preceded by: Sir Zelman Cowen
- Succeeded by: Bill Hayden

Justice of the High Court of Australia
- In office 1 March 1972 – 11 May 1982
- Nominated by: Billy McMahon
- Appointed by: Sir Paul Hasluck
- Preceded by: Sir Victor Windeyer
- Succeeded by: Sir William Deane

Judge of the Supreme Court of Victoria
- In office 30 June 1970 – 29 February 1972
- Nominated by: Sir Henry Bolte
- Appointed by: Sir Rohan Delacombe
- Preceded by: Robert Monahan
- Succeeded by: William Kaye

Personal details
- Born: Ninian Martin Stephen; 15 June 1923 Nettlebed, Oxfordshire, England
- Died: 29 October 2017 (aged 94) Melbourne, Australia
- Spouse: Valery Sinclair (m. 1949)
- Children: 5
- Profession: Barrister, judge

Military service
- Allegiance: Australia
- Branch/service: Second Australian Imperial Force
- Years of service: 1941–1946
- Rank: Lieutenant
- Unit: Royal Australian Artillery; Royal Australian Engineers
- Battles/wars: World War II

Sir Ninian Martin Stephen (15 June 1923 – 29 October 2017) was an English-born Australian judge who served as the 20th governor-general of Australia, in office from 1982 to 1989. He was previously a justice of the High Court of Australia from 1972 to 1982.

Stephen was born in England to Scottish parents. As a child he lived for periods in France, Germany, Scotland, and Switzerland, eventually arriving in Australia at the age of 16. Stephen served with the Australian Army during World War II, and after the war entered the legal profession. He became one of Australia's leading constitutional lawyers. Stephen was appointed to the Supreme Court of Victoria in 1970, and then to the High Court in 1972, aged 48. He was considered a member of the court's "moderate centre". In 1982, Stephen was appointed governor-general on the recommendation of Malcolm Fraser. He approved two double dissolutions during his time in office, the only governor-general to do so. After his term expired, Stephen remained active in public life as a conservationist and member of various international tribunals.

== Early life ==
Stephen was born in Nettlebed, Oxfordshire, England, to Scottish parents, Barbara (née Cruickshank) and Frederick Brown Stephen. His father, a chauffeur, poultry farmer and motorcycle courier in World War I, left the family shortly after his birth, emigrating to Canada and starting a new family; his son was told that he had died, and did not learn the truth until 2003. Stephen's mother, formerly a lady's maid was a paid companion for Nina Mylne, the wealthy heiress of the Queensland pastoralist Graham Mylne; his given name was in her honour. During his early childhood, the three of them lived for periods in Switzerland (Geneva where he was christened, and Montreaux), France (Paris, Cannes, and Saint-Cast-le-Guildo) and Germany (Wiesbaden), where Mylne took him to Nuremberg for the 1938 Reichsparteitag Grossdeutschland (5-12 September) which he photographed. They eventually moved to Edinburgh in 1929 so Stephen could begin his formal schooling.

Mylne paid for Stephen's education, which took place in Scotland (George Watson's College and Edinburgh Academy), London (St Paul's School), and Switzerland (Chillon College, Montreux). He and Mylne generally traveled together, while his mother remained in Scotland and ran a boardinghouse. In 1940, the three of them moved to Melbourne to avoid the war, booking first into the Oriental Hotel then taking a flat in Linden Hall opposite Scotch College which Stephen attended for two terms, and was then accepted into the University of Melbourne to study law.

== Second World War ==
In December 1941, following the end of his first year at university, Stephen enlisted in the Citizens Military Force to serve part-time in the Melbourne University Regiment. Following Japan's entry into World War II, Stephen completed full-time military training from 8 December 1941 to 15 February 1942 and was then posted to the 10th Field Regiment, Royal Australian Artillery, serving in Western Australia. He subsequently transferred to the Second Australian Imperial Force. In late 1943, Stephen transferred to the Royal Australian Engineers, serving in New Guinea from April to August 1944 with the 43rd Australian Water Transport Company. He then attended courses, culminating in a commissioning course in April 1945. As a lieutenant, he served in the 41st Australian Landing Craft Company in New Guinea and New Britain. In August 1945, he was posted to Labuan, Borneo, arriving after the war's end and serving there until January 1946. After returning to Australia, he was discharged on 5 February 1946.

== Legal career ==
Stephen completed his studies after the war's end, and was admitted to the Victorian Bar in 1949. By the 1960s, he had become one of Australia's leading constitutional and commercial lawyers. He was made a Queen's Counsel in 1966.

== Judicial career ==
On 30 June 1970, Stephen was appointed as a judge of the Supreme Court of Victoria. He held this position until 29 February 1972, relinquishing it to take up his appointment as a justice of the High Court of Australia. He was sworn of the Privy Council of the United Kingdom in 1979 and sat as a member of its Judicial Committee.

Although Stephen was appointed to the High Court by a Liberal government, he proved not to be a traditional conservative upholder of states' rights. He joined the "moderate centre" of the court, between the arch-conservatism of Sir Garfield Barwick and the radicalism of Lionel Murphy. In 1982 he was part of the majority that decided on a broad interpretation of the "external affairs power" of the Australian constitution in the Koowarta v Bjelke-Petersen case.

== Governor-general ==
In March 1982, Prime Minister Malcolm Fraser announced that Queen Elizabeth II had approved his recommendation of Sir Ninian Stephen to succeed Sir Zelman Cowen as Governor-General of Australia. His appointment was praised by both sides of politics. He was sworn in on 29 July 1982, the first former High Court justice to become governor-general since Sir Isaac Isaacs in 1931. When Fraser was defeated by the Labor Party under Bob Hawke in 1983, Stephen had no difficulty working with a Labor government. In 1987, his term was extended by 18 months as a mark of personal respect and also to allow Bill Hayden (to whom Hawke had promised the position) to leave politics at a time of his choosing. Stephen is the only governor-general to have approved two double dissolutions – in 1983 (for Fraser) and 1987 (for Hawke).

== Later work ==
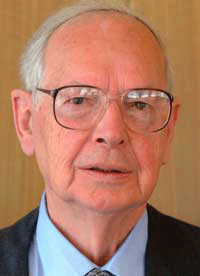
Stephen in November 2006

In 1989, Stephen became Australia's first Ambassador for the Environment and, in his three-year term, was particularly energetic in working for a ban of mining in Antarctica. In 1990 he became the chair of the Australian Antarctic Foundation, based in Hobart, and subsequently also became the chair of the Constitutional Centenary Foundation, based in Melbourne, which was established following the 1991 Constitutional Centenary Conference. In 1991, he undertook a difficult task when he was appointed chairman of the second strand of the Northern Ireland peace talks. From 1991 to 1995, he was a judge ad hoc of the International Court of Justice in the case East Timor (Portugal v. Australia) 1991–1995. From 1993 to 1997, he was a judge on the international tribunals investigating war crimes in Yugoslavia and Rwanda. He also served as chairman of the Australian Citizenship Council from 1998. In 1994, he acted as a special envoy of the UN Secretary General to resolve political conflicts in Bangladesh.

Stephen later moved back into the legal field, becoming president of an arbitral tribunal constituted under Chapter 11 of the North American Free Trade Agreement (NAFTA), charged with the adjudication of an investment dispute between Mondev, a Canadian investor, and the United States.

A detailed scholarly biography of Stephen, Fortunate Voyager by Philip Ayres, was released in September 2013. Drawing upon it, Ayres also summarised Stephen's career for the Victorian Bar News.

== Honours ==
Viceregal styles of Sir Ninian Stephen
- Reference style: His Excellency The Right Honourable
- Spoken style: Your Excellency

Stephen was made a Knight Commander of the Order of the British Empire (KBE) on 20 April 1972 "for distinguished services to the Law", and sworn of the Privy Council in 1979. As governor-general he was made a Knight of the Order of Australia (AK), Knight Grand Cross of the Order of St Michael and St George (GCMG) and Knight Grand Cross of the Royal Victorian Order (GCVO). In 1994, Queen Elizabeth II appointed him a Knight Companion of the Order of the Garter (KG), making him the most recent Australian to be granted a knighthood in the personal gift of the monarch of Australia. He, therefore, had the unusual distinction of holding five separate knighthoods and joined Lord Casey and Sir Paul Hasluck as one of the few Australian Knights Companion of the Order of the Garter. In 1983, he was named a Commandeur of the French Légion d'honneur.

Stephen delivered the first Sir Ninian Stephen Lecture at the University of Newcastle's law school in 1993, giving his name to this lecture series.

Knight Companion of the Order of the Garter (KG)	1994
Knight of the Order of Australia (AK)	1982
Knight Grand Cross of the Order of St Michael and St George (GCMG)	1982
Knight Grand Cross of the Royal Victorian Order (GCVO)	1982
Knight Commander of the Order of the British Empire (KBE)	1972
Knight of Grace of the Venerable Order of St John of Jerusalem (KStJ)	1982
1939–45 Star	
Pacific Star	
War Medal 1939–1945	
Australia Service Medal 1939–45	
Queen Elizabeth II Silver Jubilee Medal	1977
Centenary Medal	2001
Commander of the Legion of Honour	France; 1983

== Personal life and death ==
In June 1949, Stephen married Valery Mary Sinclair (4 July 1925 – 3 November 2019) and they had five daughters. Stephen and his wife were patrons of the Australian Inland Botanic Gardens. He died in Melbourne on 29 October 2017, aged 94. A state funeral for Stephen was held on 8 November at St Paul's Cathedral, Melbourne.

== Arms ==
Coat of arms of Sir Ninian Martin Stephen, KG, AK, GCMG, GCVO, KBE, PC, QC
Notes Knight since 1972 Crest An Australian king-parrot proper upon a branch of golden wattle also proper. Torse Mantling Argent and Azure. Escutcheon Argent a fess Azure charged with six ermine spots Or, between three Thistle stalks Vert blossomed Purpure between two golden wattle branches Vert blossomed Or, 2,1. Orders The Order of the Garter circlet. The neck badge as Knight of the Order of Australia. The neck badge as Knight Commander of the Order of the British Empire. The collar as Knight Grand Cross of the Order of St Michael and St George. The sash insignia as Knight Grand Cross of the Royal Victorian Order. The badge as Knight of the Order of St John. Symbolism The golden wattle is Australia's floral emblem. The thistle is Scotland's floral emblem.

Government offices
Preceded by Sir Zelman Cowen	Governor-General of Australia; 1982–1989	Succeeded by Bill Hayden
Diplomatic posts
New title	Australian Ambassador for the Environment; 1989–1992	Succeeded by Penelope Wensley
