= Department of Families, Community Services and Indigenous Affairs =

Australian government department, 2006–2007

Department overview
- Formed: 27 January 2006
- Preceding Department: Department of Family and Community Services Department of Immigration and Multicultural and Indigenous Affairs
- Dissolved: 3 December 2007
- Superseding Department: Department of Families, Housing, Community Services and Indigenous Affairs
- Jurisdiction: Commonwealth of Australia
- Headquarters: Greenway, Canberra
- Department executive: Jeff Harmer, Secretary
- Website: facsia.gov.au

The Department of Families, Community Services and Indigenous Affairs (also known as FaCSIA) was an Australian government department that existed between January 2006 and December 2007. The department which preceded the Department of Families, Community Services and Indigenous Affairs was the Department of Family and Community Services (1998–2006).

== History ==
=== Before the formation of FaCSIA ===
Before the Department of Families, Community Services and Indigenous Affairs existed, the 2003–2004 federal budget included a $8.6 million funding that allowed the department to support a 12-year longitudinal study of Indigenous children. The purpose of the study was to improve the quality of data on Indigenous children and their foundational years growing up. This was led by the senator at the time, the Hon. Amanda Vanstone - Minister for Family and Community Services.

In 2004, certain functions and operational activities within ATSIS-ATSIC were transferred to the department in respect to community housing and infrastructure for Indigenous women. From July 2004, Aboriginal Hostels Limited was transferred under the portfolio of the Department of Family and Community Services.

=== Forming the Department ===
On 27 January 2006, the Office of Indigenous Policy Coordination (OPIC) was absorbed by the Department of Families, Community Services, and Indigenous Affairs (FaCSIA) due to an announcement by the Prime Minister. Following this, an upheaval in the organisation of ministerial responsibilities saw Indigenous Affairs allocated to the department with a new cabinet minister, Mal Brough, to oversee.

Mal Brough's new policy and rhetoric was focused on the relocation of portfolio responsibilities that the Department of Families, Community Services, and Indigenous Affairs now is responsible for. In Mal Brough's first major speech as minister for the department in late April 2006 at the Social Innovations Dialogue conference, Brough was recorded to have focused strongly on family, and pushing for family values as the “fundamental building block through which children are instilled with values and principles and prepared for the challenges of the future.” (Sanders, p. 3, 2015).

In May 2006, the Office of Indigenous Policy Coordination (OIPC) official became a part of FaCSIA, aligning the department more with Indigenous Affairs.

In March 2007, there were many criticisms directed towards the department for its failure to enact positive change for relevant stakeholders, particularly in the housing component of the department. Specifically, there were identified failures associated with the Community Housing and Infrastructure Program (CHIP), which ATSIC had passed onto the Commonwealth Department of Family and Community Services in 2004.

One such organisation to critique the department during this time was a review conducted by Price Waterhouse Coopers (PwC), which stated, “the housing needs of Indigenous Australians in remote areas have not been well served and the interests and expectations of taxpayers have not been met.” (Sanders, p. 5, 2015).

=== The Community Housing and Infrastructure Program (CHIP) ===
The CHIP project as concluded by many organisations such as PwC, was an ineffective government project administered by the department which led to, “policy confusion, complex administration and poor outcomes and accountability of government funded housing, infrastructure and municipal services.” (Price Waterhouse Coopers, p. 16, 2007). The PwC 2007 report even went to the extent of stating that the program should be abolished.

Another perspective on the CHIP project which aligns with PwC's criticisms is Minister Brough's view on its ineffectiveness and clear failure to meet the needs of Indigenous housing and helping the relevant stakeholders involved. Minister Brough has stated, that CHIP, previously managed by ATSIC, “has clearly failure to deliver and needs urgent reform… while billions of dollars have been invested in Indigenous housing, there is little to show for it." (Sanders, p.6, 2015).

The PwC 2007 report also recorded Minister Brough’s perspective, “We’ve been chasing our tail and not seeing any significant progress in overcoming the Indigenous housing problem in remote Australia particularly. The review of CHIP...found current Indigenous housing arrangements flawed and unsustainable. It provides a sober analysis of the situation and radical way forward.” (Sanders, p. 6, 2015).

The result of the critic and the PwC report has led to the department adopting a new strategic framework which proposed to combine Indigenous community housing with public housing under one broad division for the department to oversee. This meant expanding public housing and aiding home ownership, particularly focusing on remote areas on community title land. Minister Brough responded to these changes positively, stating that the department's future directions are focused on exploring making positive changes in Indigenous housing.

This focus on Indigenous housing led to the development of numerous funding packages that aimed to incentivise home ownership in the Indigenous population. These incentives tied housing funding commitments to land tenure change and focused on Indigenous-concentrated areas, which led to a degree of controversy. Specifically, in Alice Springs town camps which rejected the funding packages. Other packages, like the Tiwi Islands near Darwin and Noel Pearson's home community in Cape York expanded extensively to include education, sport, welfare reform beyond housing and land ownership.

It was this focus on housing that led to the closure of the department and the creation of the Department of Families, Housing, Community Services and Indigenous Affairs. The new department assumed most of the responsibilities of FaCSIA, but expanded its operational activities to include:

- Housing policy co-ordination, welfare housing and rent assistance
- Indigenous policy co-ordination and the promotion of reconciliation
- Community development employment projects

== FaCSIA Strategic Framework 2006–2009 ==
FaCSIA developed a strategic framework from 2006 to 2009 in order to improve the lives and wellbeing of Australians and communities with a clear set of priorities and goals. These high level priorities and outcomes outlined by the Ministers of the department to be achieved in the first twelve months were called Priority Business Results.

=== Priority Business Results 2006–2007 ===
- Measurable improvement in program compliance, efficiency and impact
- Improve access to child care, particularly in regard to working parents
- Measurable improvement in outcomes for Indigenous people from mainstream and targeted programs
- Implement the government's child support reforms
- Successfully establish strategic interventions in a range of indigenous communities, in partnership with state and territory governments
- Measurable improvement of the impact in communities of our community-based programs and interventions

The outcomes of the Priority Business Results has been recorded as an increase in self-sufficiency of Australian individuals, families and communities in social and business engagement, as well as through increased rates of seniors and people with disabilities participating in the community.

In the long term, FaCSIA's 2006–2009 Strategic Framework aims to ensure that Australian families, individuals and communities are participating in economic and social activities through business and other community groups. There is also a long-term focus on early interventions of issues like domestic violence, mental health, youth suicide, etc. to ensure that the younger generations of Australia have the best start to life.

FaCSIA's strategic framework also outlines that it is dedicated to activating intergenerational change that responds to the ageing population, Australia's declining birth rate and the changing needs of Indigenous Australians.

== Scope ==
Information about the department's functions and government funding allocation could be found in the Administrative Arrangements Orders, the annual Portfolio Budget Statements, the department's annual reports and on the Department's website.

According to the Administrative Arrangements Order made on 27 January 2006, the department dealt with all the previous functions of the Department of Family and Community Services along with matters related to Indigenous affairs and reconciliation Previous functions of the Department of Family and Community Services inherited by FaCSIA were:

- Income security policies and programmes for families with children, carers, the aged and people in hardship
- Services for families with children, people with disabilities and carers
- Community support services, excluding the Home and Community Care program
- Family relationship services
- Welfare housing and rent assistance
- Youth affairs, excluding income support policies and programs
- Women's policies and programs

Matters dealt with by the Department of Families, Community Services and Indigenous Affairs include Indigenous Affairs and reconciliation, Families, Communities, Individuals, and the Social Support System (FaCSIA, 2014).

=== Portfolio legislation ===
- Social Security Law and Guide to the Social Security Law
- Family Assistance Law and Family Assistance Guide
- Commonwealth State Housing Agreement
- International Agreements
- Family Assistance Legislation and Consolidated Disallowable Instruments
- Disallowable Instruments - means test

==== Other legislation specific to Indigenous Affairs administered by the Minister of the Department both before and after the official establishment of the Department of Families, Community Services, and Indigenous Affairs (Commonwealth of Australia, 2006) ====
| Legislation | Year |
|---|---|
| Aboriginal and Torres Strait Islander Act | 2005 |
| Aboriginal and Torres Strait Islanders (Queensland Reserves and Communities Self-management) Act | 1978 |
| Aboriginal Councils and Associations Act | 1976 |
| Aboriginal Affairs (Arrangements with the States) Act | 1973 |
| Aboriginal Land Grant (Jervis Bay Territory) Act | 1986 |

=== Administrative Arrangements Order (AAO) ===
Another relevant legislation that is within the scope of FaCSIA is the Administrative Arrangements Order. Part 8: The Department of Family and Community Services of the Commonwealth of Australia, Administrative Arrangements Order, signed by the Governor General, His Excellency Major General Michael Jeffery AC CVO MC specifically is within the scope of the department.

=== Reports and reviews ===
The department also commissions reports and reviews, such as the review of Early Intervention Therapies for Autism Spectrum Disorders, DisabilityCare Australia and the Gender Wage gap. The review was a follow up and extension of a 2006 report commissioned by the Australian Government Department of Health and Aging. The purpose of the review, despite being not directly linked to the department's main scope and jurisdiction, was to provide up to date information to families about the evidence for efficacy of interventions for young children with autism spectrum disorder (ASD) from birth up to the age of 7 years. The department pursued ratings of scientific merit for the report's intervention research to establish an internationally recognised scientific criteria for treatment efficacy.

== Structure ==
The department was an Australian Public Service department, staffed by officials who were responsible to the Minister for Community Services and the Minister assisting the Prime Minister for Women's Issues.

=== Ministers ===
The Minister for Families, Community Services and Indigenous and the Minister Assisting the Prime Minister for Indigenous Affairs was the Hon Mal Brough MP.

The Minister for Community Services was the Hon John Cobb MP.

The Minister Assisting the Prime Minister for Women's Issues was the Hon Julie Bishop MP.

=== Secretaries ===
The Secretary of the Department was Jeff Harmer. The Associate Secretary, Wayne Gibbons, looked after the Office of Indigenous Policy Coordination (OIPC). Deputy Secretary, Glenys Beauchamp, oversaw social policy, families, children, women and youth. Deputy Secretary, Stephen Hunter, oversaw housing and disability, communities, corporate support and, business and financial services. Deputy Secretary, Bernie Yates, oversaw program operations, Information Management and Technology, performance, policy, land and resources and leadership development.

The following organisation structure was announced on 2 May 2006 and took into effect from Monday 8 May 2006.

== Partnerships ==
As part of FaCSIA's Statement of Commitment to Aboriginal and Torres Strait Islander people, FaCSIA established numerous Indigenous Coordination Centres across regional Australia to help with Indigenous services and programs.

=== State and territory governments ===
FaCSIA has worked with state and territory governments to create collaborative funding agreements where the governments and the department develop strategies, programs and policies to cover disability and housing, and prevent domestic violence, youth suicide and homelessness.

These agreements include:

- Commonwealth-State/Territory Disability Agreement
- Commonwealth-State Housing Agreement
- Supported Accommodation Assistance Program

=== Government agencies ===
FaCSIA also works with government agencies, such as Centrelink, to help with the recovery of Australians, families and communities in the event of national emergencies and international disasters. These partnerships aim to provide individuals and families financial payments and support to recover after crisis.

=== Other partnerships involve ===
- foreign governments
- businesses
- not-for-profit sector
- services providers
- research bodies
- families and communities

== Reducing red tape ==
FaCSIA has also been focused on reducing administrative red tape in its operational activities and business processes in order to maximise efficiency and outcomes.

Consultations with the department occurred from October 2005 to June 2006 to discover new ways of decreasing administrative inefficiencies whilst ensuring that quality standards were upheld within the government department. These consultations were held with service providers, advisory bodies through emails, discussions and round table discussions held in each state and territory.

The outcome of these consultations have been uploaded for public access in the form of Progress Reports. In summary, the Progress Reports suggested a streamlining of FaCSIA's processes by establishing performance reporting and established frameworks for reporting, funding arrangements and application processes. These Progress Reports have been implemented to some extent, with FaCSIA implementing funding application processes and agreements on an IT streamlined platform in 2006–07.

== Further resources ==
=== Annual reports ===
- Annual Report 2007–2008 (PDF), Department of Families, Housing, Community Services and Indigenous Affairs, 2008, ISBN 978-1-921380-80-8, archived from the original (PDF) on 21 April 2014
- Annual Report 2006–2007 (PDF), Department of Families, Community Services and Indigenous Affairs, 2007, ISBN 978-1921130199, archived from the original (PDF) on 21 April 2014
- Annual Report 2005–2006 (PDF), Department of Families, Community Services and Indigenous Affairs, 2006, ISBN 1921130199, archived from the original (PDF) on 21 April 2014
