= Sir Ninian Stephen Lecture =

Legal lecture series

The Sir Ninian Stephen Lecture is an annual public lecture held by the University of Newcastle Law School. The first lecture was delivered by former Governor-General of Australia Sir Ninian Stephen in 1993, to celebrate the establishment of the Bachelor of Laws program at the university. This event continues under his name, and is generally held at an appropriate time in the academic year. The lectures have featured outstanding justice thought leaders and papers are published online and in the Newcastle Law Review.

== Sir Ninian Stephen Lecturers ==
- 1993 – Sir Ninian Stephen, "Our Democratic Constitution"
- 1994 – Justice Michael McHugh, "The Growth of Legislation and Litigation"
- 1995 – Justice Deirdre O'Connor, "The Effect of Australia's International Obligations on the Development of Our System of Industrial Relations"
- 1996 – Chief Justice Murray Gleeson, "The Secrecy of Jury Deliberations"
- 1997 – Justice Michael Kirby, "Constitutional Centenary and the Counting of Blessings"
- 1998 – Gordon Samuels, "No More Cabs on the Rank? Some Reflections about the Future of Legal Practice"
- 1999 – Chief Justice James Spigelman, "Statutory Interpretation: Identify the Linguistic Register"
- 2000 – Sir Gerard Brennan, "Principle and Independence: The Guardians of Freedom"
- 2001 – Garth Nettheim, "Making a Difference: Reconciling our Differences"
- 2002 – Hilary Charlesworth, "International Law and Australian Law in the 21st Century"
- 2003 – Noel Pearson, "The High Court's Abandonment of the 'Time Honoured Methodology of the Common Law' in its Interpretation of Native Title in Mirriuwung Gajerrong and Yorta Yorta"
- 2004 – Julian Burnside, "The Practice of Law: Justice or Just a Job"
- 2005 – Margaret Cunneen, "Living Within the Law"
- 2006 – Frank Brennan, "Confessions of an Erstwhile Land Rights Advocate"
- 2007 – Graeme Innes, "Using the Law to Make a Difference"
- 2008 – Justice John Basten, "Human Rights and the Rule of Law"
- 2009 – Stephen Gageler, "Fact and Law"
- 2010 – Hal Wootten, "Finding a Life in the Law"
- 2011 – Justice Julie Ward, "The Modern Day Fusion Falacy – Should There Be a Separate Bar?"
- 2012 – Kevin Lindgren, "The Rule of Law: Its State of Health in Australia"
- 2013 – Nicola Roxon, "Breathing value into your law degree"
- 2014 – Chief Justice Robert French, "The Practising of Law in a Global Neighbourhood"
- 2015 – Professor Neil Rees, "I look ahead"
- 2016 – Justice Virginia Bell, "Equality, Proportionality and Dignity : The Guiding Principles for a Just Legal System"
- 2017 – Justice Margaret Beazley, "Language: Law's Essential Tool"
- 2018 – The Hon Wayne Martin AC, "Restorative Cities – The Role of the Justice System".
- 2019 – Deputy Chief Justice Robert McClelland, "Creativity in Dispute Resolution in Family Law Cases".
- 2020- Justice Monika Schmidt,"Courts and Technology - Pivoting from Chaos to the Unknown".
- 2022 - Chief Justice Andrew Bell, "Justice Innovation".
