= Aboriginal and Torres Strait Islander Commission =

Australian government agency (1990–2005)

Agency overview
- Formed: 5 March 1990
- Preceding Agency: Department of Aboriginal Affairs; Aboriginal Development Commission
- Dissolved: 30 June 2005
- Superseding Agency: Office of Indigenous Policy Coordination
- Jurisdiction: Commonwealth of Australia
- Headquarters: Canberra
- Agency executives: Lowitja O'Donoghue, Chairperson (1990–1996); Gatjil Djerrkura, Chairperson (1996–2000); Geoff Clark, Chairperson (2000–2004)
- Website: atsic.gov.au

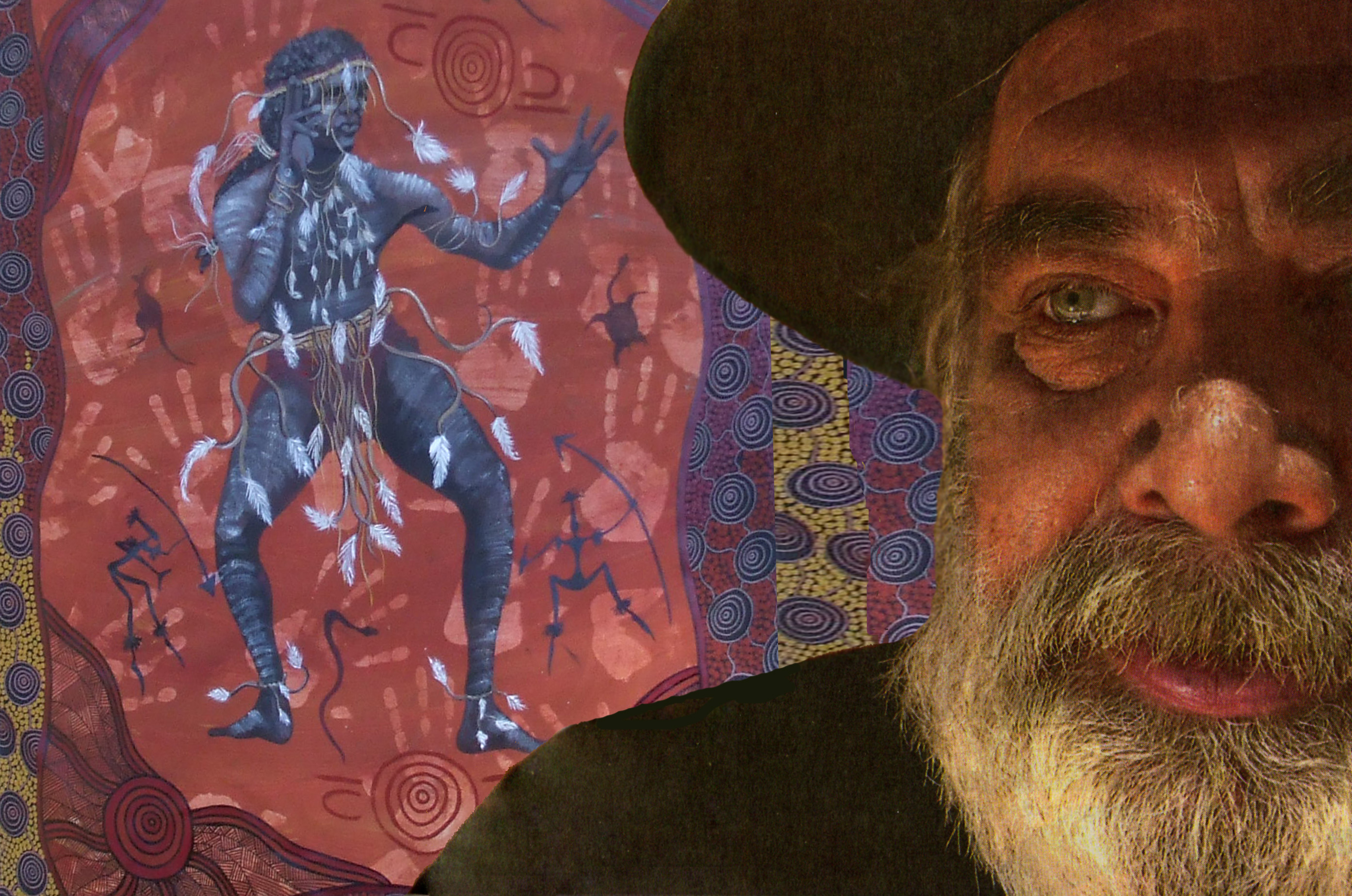
'Alcheringa Spirit' an Australian limestone sculpture displayed in the foyer of the ATSIC Commission in Sydney was created by Australian Aboriginal artist Mundara Koorang

The Aboriginal and Torres Strait Islander Commission (ATSIC) (1990–2005) was the Australian Government body through which Aboriginal Australians and Torres Strait Islanders were formally involved in the processes of government affecting their lives, established under the Hawke government in 1990. A number of indigenous programs and organisations fell under the overall umbrella of ATSIC.

The agency was dissolved in 2005 in the aftermath of litigation involving its chairperson, Geoff Clark. It was the longest running Indigenous advisory body to have existed.

== History ==
ATSIC was established by the Hawke government through the Aboriginal and Torres Strait Islander Commission Act 1989 (the ATSIC Act), which took effect on 5 March 1990. It superseded the Aboriginal Development Commission (ADC), a statutory authority created by the Fraser government in July 1980. In 1990 Minister for Aboriginal Affairs Gerry Hand proposed merging the functions of the ADC into the newly created ATSIC, by establishing a new body, the Aboriginal Economic Development Corporation (AEDC), which was created along with ATSIC. Both were formally established in March 1990, with ATSIC responsible for providing loans for small enterprise and larger loans and grants, while ATSIC Development Corporation (ATSICDC) was to invest only in major commercial projects.

While ATSIC's existence was always subject to the oversight of governments who represent all Australians, ATSIC was a group of elected individuals whose main goal was the oversights that related to indigenous Australians, who include the many Aboriginal peoples of Australia as well as Torres Strait Islander peoples, of the Torres Strait Islands (part of Queensland). However, in 1994 the Torres Strait Regional Authority (TSRA) was established as a separate authority, in order to deliver better services and programs to Torres Strait Islander people who were living in the Torres Strait Islands (i.e. excluding those on the mainland).

== People ==
The chairs of ATSIC were:

- Lowitja O'Donoghue (1990–1996)
- Gatjil Djerrkura (1996–2000)
- Geoff Clark (2000–2004)
- Lionel Quartermaine (2003–2004)

Deputy chairs included Ray Robinson.

Mick Gooda succeeded Tom Calma to become ATSIC's final Chief Executive Officer.

From 1982 until 1993, Vince Copley, as sports officer at ATSIC, ran a series of competitions and carnivals at which new talent could be identified, and also established an annual awards sports night for Aboriginal athletes, which ran for around a decade.

== Controversy and review ==
In 2001, ATSIC became embroiled in controversy over litigation surrounding its chairperson Geoff Clark, relating to his alleged participation in several rapes in the 1970s and 1980s, after being named by four women.

Soon after this, the government under then Prime Minister John Howard began to remove some of ATSIC's fiscal powers, which were transferred to a new independent organisation, Aboriginal and Torres Strait Islander Services (ATSIS). The government suspended Geoff Clark as chair of ATSIC in 2003 after he was convicted of obstructing police during a pub brawl, and Lionel Quartermaine became acting chair.

A review of ATSIC was commissioned in 2003. The report, authored by John Hannaford, Jackie Huggins and Bob Collins, was titled In the Hands of the Regions: A New ATSIC Report of the Review of the Aboriginal and Torres Strait Islander Commission, and it recommended reforms which gave greater control of ATSIC to Aboriginal and Torres Strait Islander people at a regional level. At the time, Indigenous Affairs Minister Amanda Vanstone stated that the review had concluded that ATSIC has not connected well with the indigenous Australians and was not serving them well.

== Abolition ==
For some time after Clark's appointment, the Howard government had been expressing doubts as to the value of continuing to have ATSIC at all. Following Mark Latham's election to the leadership of the (Labor) Opposition in December 2003, Labor agreed with the government that ATSIC had not worked. In April of election year 2004, both parties pledged to introduce alternative arrangements for Indigenous affairs, with Labor proposing a new elected national body.

The government's plan was to abolish ATSIC and all of its regional and state structures, and return funding for Indigenous programs to the relevant line departments. Labor's view was that ATSIC itself should be abolished, but many of the regional and state sub-organisations should be retained, to continue to give Indigenous people a voice in their own affairs and within their own communities. It rejected the notion of merging Indigenous funding into funding for Australians generally as "tried and failed", but had not announced its alternative proposals.

Howard announced the agency's abolition on 15 April 2004, saying that "the experiment in elected representation for Indigenous people has been a failure". On 28 May 2004 the government introduced into the Federal Parliament legislation to abolish ATSIC. The Bill finally passed both houses of Parliament in 2005, and ATSIC was formally abolished at midnight 16 March 2005.

== Successors ==
=== Ministerial Taskforce on Indigenous Affairs ===
On 28 May 2004 the Ministerial Taskforce on Indigenous Affairs (MTF) was established for the purpose of "driving the delivery of improved services and outcomes for Indigenous Australians". It was chaired by Mal Brough, Minister for Families, Community Services and Indigenous Affairs and Minister Assisting the Prime Minister for Indigenous Affairs.

=== Office of Indigenous Policy Coordination ===
The Office of Indigenous Policy Coordination was created within the Department of Immigration and Multicultural and Indigenous Affairs on 1 July 2004 "to coordinate and drive the Government's new arrangements in Indigenous affairs", and took on ATSIC's responsibilities upon its abolition. Following machinery of government changes, that office was transferred to the Department of Families, Community Services and Indigenous Affairs on 27 January 2006.

=== National Indigenous Council ===
On 6 November 2004 a government-appointed advisory body, the National Indigenous Council, was announced by the former Minister for Indigenous Affairs, Senator Vanstone, who said that the National Indigenous Council would "provide expert advice to the Australian Government on policy, program and service-delivery issues affecting Aboriginal people and Torres Strait Islanders". It would act as an advisory body only, to support the work of the Ministerial Taskforce on Indigenous Affairs.

== Inquiry and other commentary ==
At the time the government announced its dismantling, Bob Collins, who had served in the Hawke ministry when ATSIC was established, said that the organisation had let down Indigenous people by deciding that "looking after Geoff Clark was more important than looking after ATSIC".

Following an Inquiry, the 2005 report by its Select Committee said that while there had been widespread support for instituting changes to the way that ATSIC was structured as well as how it operates, there was also "overwhelming" support for the continued existence of a national Indigenous representative body. Most witnesses had suggested that regional operations could be improved, but they were strongly in favour of having a national, elected Indigenous representative body. Deep concerns were expressed about the disempowerment of Indigenous peoples. One of the recommendations was that the government "give active support and funding to the formation of a national Indigenous elected representative body, and provide it with ongoing funding".

The dismantling of ATSIC was seen by many commentators as harmful to Aboriginal people in Australia. In 2009, Lowitja O'Donoghue expressed her opinion that reform of the agency would have been better than establishing a new agency which has been costly and might suffer similar problems as its predecessor, such as nepotism.

ATSIC was criticised by a government advisory panel in 2009 for having been dominated by males.

== See also ==
- Australian Aboriginal identity
- Indigenous Voice to Parliament
- List of Australian Commonwealth Government entities
- National Aboriginal and Torres Strait Islander Education Policy
