= Sámi parliament =

Sámi parliament may refer to the following:

- Kola Sámi Assembly, unofficial representative body of Sámi people in Russia
- Sámi Parliament of Finland, official representative body of Sámi people in Finland
- Sámi Parliament of Norway, official representative body of Sámi people in Norway
- Sámi Parliament of Sweden, official representative body of Sámi people in Sweden
