= Indigenous Coordination Centres =

Government agency overview
- Preceding Government agency: Aboriginal and Torres Strait Islanders Commission (ATSIC)
- Jurisdiction: Government of Australia
- Parent department: National Indigenous Australians Agency

Indigenous Coordination Centres or ICCs are regional offices of the Australian Government Office of Indigenous Policy Coordination.

Indigenous Coordination Centres (ICC) are responsible for the provision and distribution of services to Indigenous Australians. As of 2021, ICC offices operate in 30 locations across Australia. Indigenous affairs were previously governed by the Aboriginal and Torres Strait Islander Commission (ATSIC) from 1990-2005, the latter of which was dissolved due to a failure to meet its primary objectives including reducing poverty among Indigenous peoples. Following this dissolution, the Indigenous Coordination Centres then became the go between for Indigenous peoples and the Australian government.

== History ==
ICCs are currently being managed by the Australian Department of Families, Community Services and Indigenous Affairs. However, they began as administrative offices under ATSIC but have since seen a reform in independent capacities.

=== Aboriginal and Torres Strait Islanders Commission (ATSIC) ===
ATSIC was formed in 1990 and oversaw the administration of Indigenous services and programs from the Australian government. It was also the main advisory body to the Australian government on the Indigenous community, issues and policy settings. ATSIC was run by an autonomous national board of directly elected Indigenous representatives. Its purpose was to increase Indigenous participation in the political process where those processes directly related to their lives and would have effects on them. ICCs were used as administration offices and were overseen under the Commission. This Commission lasted 15 years, before being disbanded in 2005.

Although the Commission had higher rates of Indigenous involvement and representation than any other government agency at the time, ATSIC was deemed a failure. This happened for a number of reasons. Firstly, ATSIC faced rigid scrutiny in the name of keeping it accountable to central government, the result of which was slowness in administration and progress of the Indigenous programs enacted by the Commission. Secondly, an official government report cited the still widespread socioeconomic disparity, health challenges and low standards of living for Indigenous Australians, a challenge that ATSIC was created to combat. It also became the subject of political scrutiny, as there was a consensus in parliament that it was an unnecessary cost of tax revenue.

ATSIC was dissolved with the aim of streamlining Indigenous programs and assigning them directly to suitable government departments, such that a specific department could look after the corresponding specific Indigenous program. ICCs would then be used – after ATSIC’s dissolution – to coordinate between those government departments and the Indigenous community.

=== The New Arrangements ===
The New Arrangements followed ATSIC’s dismantling and were enacted to address the socioeconomic disparity of Indigenous peoples, as compared to other Australians. These arrangements have been termed as a ‘whole-of-government approach.’ This approach delineated new strategies for interactions between Indigenous Australian community representatives and the various levels of the Australian government.

They consist of three cornerstones including ICCs, Shared Responsibility Agreements (SRAs) and Regional Partnership Agreements (RPAs), and these agreements were made to outline the aims and responsibilities of the Australian government’s cooperation and coordination with Indigenous communities in addressing Indigenous affairs. The ICC responsibilities were also expanded under this arrangement.

== Regions ==
As of January 2022, ICC offices operate in 30 regions across Australia including:

- Adelaide Indigenous Coordination Centre
- Alice Springs Indigenous Coordination Centre
- Bourke Indigenous Coordination Centre
- Brisbane Indigenous Coordination Centre
- Broome Indigenous Coordination Centre
- Cairns Indigenous Coordination Centre
- Cape York Indigenous Coordination Centre
- Ceduna Indigenous Coordination Centre
- Coffs Harbour Indigenous Coordination Centre
- Darwin Indigenous Coordination Centre
- Derby Indigenous Coordination Centre
- Geraldton Indigenous Coordination Centre
- Hobart Indigenous Coordination Centre
- Kalgoorlie Indigenous Coordination Centre
- Katherine Indigenous Coordination Centre
- Kununurra Indigenous Coordination Centre
- Melbourne Indigenous Coordination Centre
- Mount Isa Indigenous Coordination Centre
- Nhulunbuy Indigenous Coordination Centre
- Perth Indigenous Coordination Centre
- Port Augusta Indigenous Coordination Centre
- Queanbeyan Indigenous Coordination Centre
- Rockhampton Indigenous Coordination Centre
- Roma Indigenous Coordination Centre
- South Headland Indigenous Coordination Centre
- Sydney Indigenous Coordination Centre
- Tamworth Indigenous Coordination Centre
- Tennant Creek Indigenous Coordination Centre
- Townsville Indigenous Coordination Centre
- Wagga Wagga Indigenous Coordination Centre

== Challenges and Aims ==
ICCs coordinate interaction between Indigenous Australians and mainstream government, as well as providing Indigenous leaders with an access point to different government agencies. The Indigenous community in Australia faces challenges along socio-economic lines, including lower health and living standards, not enough government support, as well as passivity in political processes. ICCs are funded to tackle these challenges; their core aims are to restructure “policy development implementation and monitoring,” and to support “coordination of activities across Commonwealth, state and non-governmental sectorial boundaries”.

== Policy Implementation ==
ICCs have been credited as a resourceful and unique response to the challenges faced by Indigenous Australians. ICCs function by coordinating the various departments that are responsible for distributing services to Indigenous people. Since ICCs are also responsible for brokering SRAs, they have been credited with successfully making these agreements with local communities. The government has dedicated funds for programs supporting victims of domestic violence and improving infrastructure for Indigenous communities under the authority of ICCs. These centres have also enhanced localised problem-solving and cultural consciousness.

== Criticisms ==
The successful coordination of Indigenous programs and funding across departments is contingent on the skills of ICC officers and managers. These skills include the ability to advocate for policy change and negotiate with different levels of government as well as being able to cooperate with the Indigenous community. ICC staff often do not have the authority or the skills suited for this kind of negotiation. They rely mostly on senior officials to mitigate the need for advocacy skills, who, in turn, tend to be in short supply.

A strong criticism that has been made against ICCs is the “institutional inertia;” that is the relative slowness and bureaucracy of policy execution that hinders the ICC’s ability to effectively coordinate programs. This bureaucracy has been criticised for resource wastage, where those resources could have gone directly into Indigenous development. Because of the bureaucracy, there is also a disconnect between the lived realities of Indigenous Australians and the policies implemented on their behalf. Communication between the ICCs and central government tends to be ineffective, therefore the policy settings made by the far-removed Commonwealth government are at times insufficient in addressing Indigenous issues.

Accountability is also difficult to track, due to the vague outlines of large-scale coordination between government agencies and ICCs. ICC managers have to negotiate with different levels of government and there is often confusion around effective policy implementation and shifting policy objectives. ICCs are often unable to meet their goals due to limited funding. Funds are tied to certain prerequisites and strict conditions, which Indigenous communities struggle to meet. Program funding was supposed to be streamlined under ICCs, but they have not succeeded in doing so. This is due to the complexity of coordinating between different government departments and getting approval for programs, as well as coordinating within each Indigenous community. Each government department requires their own particular program report, formatted to their standards, increasing the complexity and tediousness of the process. Programs which do receive adequate funding are often short-lived, with funding contracts only being valid for a year, before another round of advocacy is needed.

The Commonwealth government has also long been criticised for being too paternalistic in their relations with Indigenous Australians, and as a consequence of keeping administration to ICCs, programs are not Indigenous led, and therefore undermine the independence and self-determination of Indigenous Australians. A consequence of relegating the responsibility of Indigenous service provision to state governments as opposed to federal government is that the engagement of the states in community development in remote spaces is limited. Therefore, Indigenous programs in more remote areas are suffering from neglect from state government, as compared with larger cities. There is a perception that remote Indigenous spaces are ‘ungovernable’ and too culturally and geographically distant and isolated from mainstream governance.
