= Cape York Institute for Policy and Leadership =

Australian public policy organisation

- Abbreviation: CYIPL, CYI
- Nickname: Cape York Institute
- Formation: 2004
- Founder: Noel Pearson
- Region served: Cape York Peninsula, Queensland, Australia
- Parent organization: Cape York Partnerships
- Website: Official website

The Cape York Institute for Policy and Leadership (CYIPL), also known as the Cape York Institute (CYI), is an Australian public policy organisation which researches and implements welfare reforms to reduce social inequalities between Indigenous and Non-Indigenous peoples living in Cape York. Founded by lawyer, academic, and Indigenous welfare advocate Noel Pearson in 2004, the institute prepares reports and submissions to the Australian federal government, identifying priority areas of welfare and economic reform for Cape York communities. To deliver reform, the Institute engages with a number of partner organisations, including the Cape York Partnerships and Family Responsibilities Commission. The Cape York Institute receives federal and Queensland state government funding to support welfare reform projects in areas of Indigenous education, employment, families, and housing.

== History and background ==
The Cape York Institute for Policy and Leadership (CYIPL) (also known as the Cape York Institute, or CYI) was founded by lawyer, academic, and Indigenous welfare advocate Noel Pearson. Established in July 2004, the organisation was developed in collaboration with the people of Cape York and Griffith University.

== Vision and Agenda ==
The objective of the "Cape York agenda" focuses on the expansion of Aboriginal and Torres Strait Islander peoples' human freedoms through the delivery of greater access to the "Real Economy" and removing dependency on "Passive Welfare". The Agenda refers to the "Real Economy" as an economic framework which provides incentives for Aboriginal and Torres Strait Islander peoples to manage and enhance welfare opportunities. The Institute works towards encouraging and providing greater economic participation of Aboriginal and Torres Strait Islander peoples in the public and private domain by implementing income management schemes to promote socially responsible standards of behaviour among Cape York residents when accessing welfare benefits to education, employment and housing in regional communities. The Agenda's vision promotes Indigenous independence from the welfare system and seeks to deter Aboriginal and Torres Strait Islander peoples from engaging in antisocial behaviour by growing private home ownership, increasing participation in the Australian workforce and primary and secondary education. The primary goal of the Institute’s reform programs is to assist Indigenous peoples’ realisation of a sense of autonomy and responsibility above dependency on welfare and economic entitlement.

== Description, governance, and functions ==
The Cape York Institute researches and implements welfare reforms in order to reduce social inequalities between Indigenous and Non-Indigenous peoples living in Cape York. It prepares reports and submissions to the federal government, identifying priority areas of welfare and economic reform to restore social norms within the Cape York communities.

To deliver welfare and economic reform, the Institute engages with a number of partner organisations, including the Cape York Partnerships, Family Responsibilities Commission, Balkanu Cape York Development Corporation, and the Cape York Aboriginal Australian Academy.

The Cape York Institute receives Commonwealth and Queensland State Government funding to support Welfare Reform Projects in areas of Indigenous education, employment, families and housing.

== Significant initiatives and projects ==
=== "From Hand Out to Hand Up" report (2007) ===
Map of Cape York Peninsula in the state of Queensland, locating the Trial communities of Hope Vale, Aurukun, Mossman Gorge and Coen

Prepared by the Cape York Institute in 2007, the "From Hand Out to Hand Up" report outlined design principles for the establishment and function of the Cape York Welfare Reform Project. Premised on connecting welfare payments to obligations to be satisfied by recipients, the report proposed the rebuilding of social norms in the Cape York communities of Aurukun, Coen, Mossman Gorge, and Hope Vale by focusing on social responsibility, education, employment and housing opportunities at the individual, family and community levels.

To assist the creation of socially responsible standards of family behaviour and ensure the protection of children's best interests within the Cape York communities, the report recommended the Queensland Government establish the Family Responsibility Commission (FRC). It was proposed that the FRC be set up as an independent statutory entity, holding members of the Cape York communities accountable to responsible expenditure of welfare payments through the Family and Conditional Income Management Schemes.

In the area of employment, the report recommended further reforms to the Community Development Employment Projects (CDEP). The CDEP assisted Aboriginal and Torres Strait Islander peoples’ transition into employment through additional welfare payments. The report proposed CDEP payments be regulated under the FRC's jurisdiction to reduce passivity and excessive reliance on welfare benefits.

The report also highlighted increased access to the government funded ABSTUDY payment scheme to support education costs and broaden living allowance benefits to Aboriginal and Torres Strait Islander youth school boarders.

To progress Indigenous home ownership within Cape York, the Report advocated the normalisation of tenancy agreements facilitated by a third party broker and the building of affordable houses in rural and remote areas. Pride of Place program mechanisms to assist tenancy, home ownership and renovations were to be implemented as part of the Project's income management measures.

=== The Cape York Trial (2008–2012) ===
In response to the Hand Up to Hand Out Report, the Commonwealth and Queensland State Governments supported a trial of the Project, providing funding of 96 million dollars from 2008 to 2012. Implemented by the Cape York Institute and partner groups, the Trial focused on four areas of Indigenous disadvantage: social responsibility, education, employment and housing.

==== Social responsibility ====
In 2008, the Institute’s Welfare Reform Trial in partnership with the Queensland State Government established the Family Responsibilities Commission (FRC) under the Family Responsibilities Commission Act 2008 (QLD). The FRC oversights the obligations required of welfare payment recipients in the Cape York communities. The FRC obtains information and or receives notifications from government agencies concerning individuals and families receiving welfare payments. The jurisdiction of the FRC is triggered where a welfare recipient has breached an obligation under the conditions imposed by the Income Management Scheme. This includes a recorded criminal conviction, engagement in anti-social behaviour (gambling, alcohol and substance abuse), non-compliance with a tenancy agreement and failure to protect children from neglect, harm and unexplained non-attendance at school. The FRC case management role includes holding conferences with community members of Cape York to determine whether the resident has complied with welfare payment obligations. Under the Social Security and Other Legislation Amendment (Welfare Payment Reform) Act 2007 (Cth), breaches of conferenced agreements can result in additional conditions, restrictions and management of a recipient’s welfare income (Conditional Income Management Scheme). The scheme restricts non-compliant individuals’ welfare payment expenditure to only essential goods such as food, clothes and medicine in order to promote responsible use of welfare entitlements.

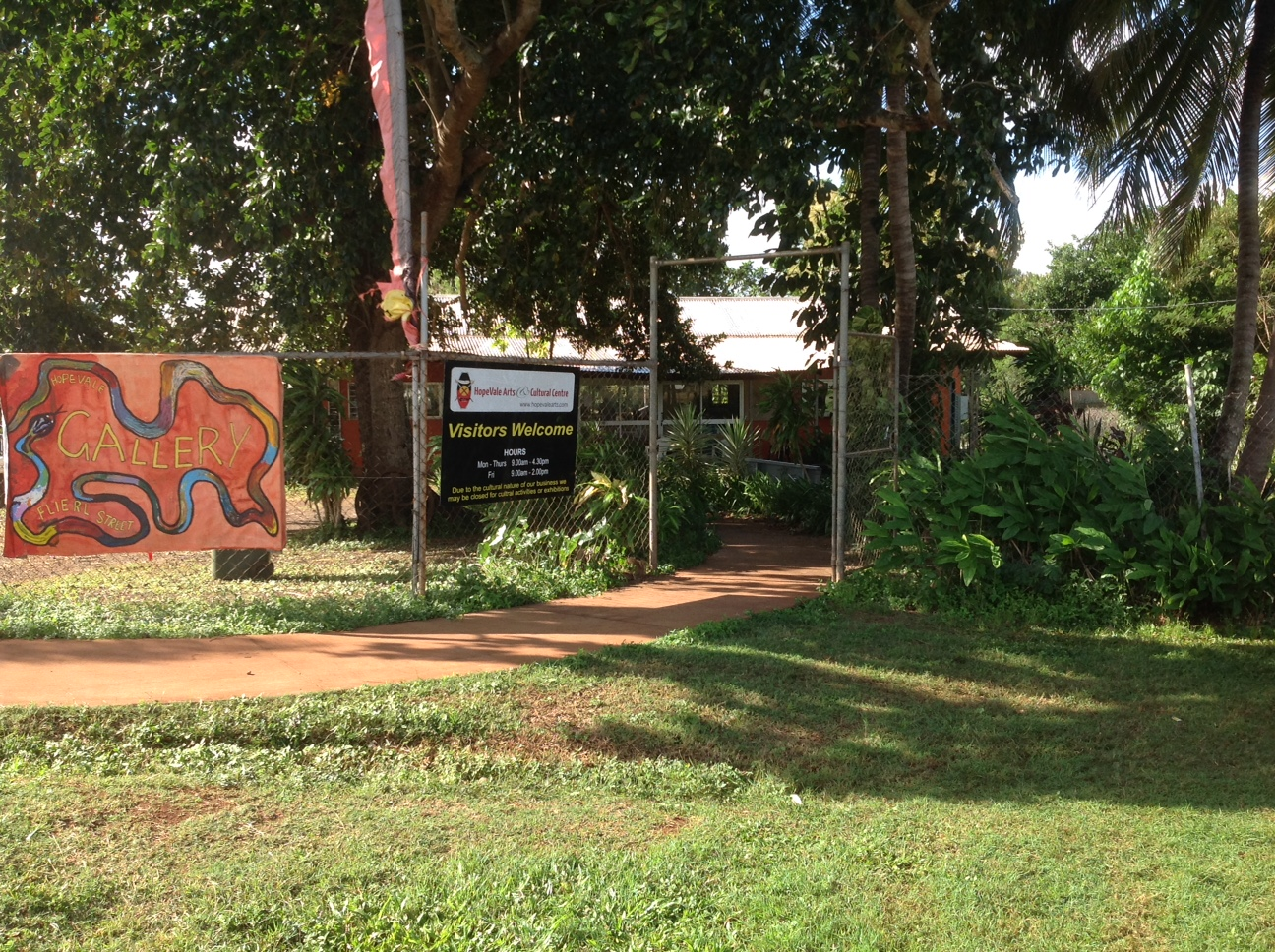
Hope Vale Arts and Cultural Centre set up under the Cape York Trial

==== Education ====
In 2011, the Cape York Institute modelled the creation of the Cape York Aboriginal Australian Academy (CYAAA). The emergence of the CYAAA in the Cape York Trial was an external initiative to the original setup of programs detailed in the Hand Out to Hand Up Report. In the final two years of the Trial’s operation, the CYAAA prepared the Student Case Management Framework and facilitated monetary funding provided by the ABSTUDY and Student Education Trusts (SETs) services. Case Managers allocated to schools collaborated with parents, students and teachers to improve school attendance rates across the four Cape York Trial communities. The CYAAA assisted Cape York families to plan a budget to cover the expenses of primary and secondary education through the Student Education Trusts services. To ensure accessibility to secondary education, the ABSTUDY allowance scheme was extended to allow Cape York Youth to attend boarding schools outside their local community.

==== Employment ====
Under the Institute’s Trial, the Community Development Employment Projects (CDEP) scheme was reformed. Changes included the transfer of employed Residents from CDEP supported wages to Conditional Income Payments, with monitoring of individual's expenditure and progress by the Institute and Family Responsibilities Commission. Under the Income Management scheme, CDEP supported employees were provided full-time positions. In conjunction with the reforms, additional training opportunities and work placement programs were implemented to improve the prospects of residents’ employability and job security. Business Precincts were established to support the development of small business within the Aurukun and Hope Vale communities. The Cape York Institute and Cape York Partnerships collaborated with Mission Australia to host mentoring and skills-based sessions. This focused on enhancing the growth of local enterprise by integrating education graduates into the workforce ministry and increasing participation in trade, engineering and healthcare apprenticeships.

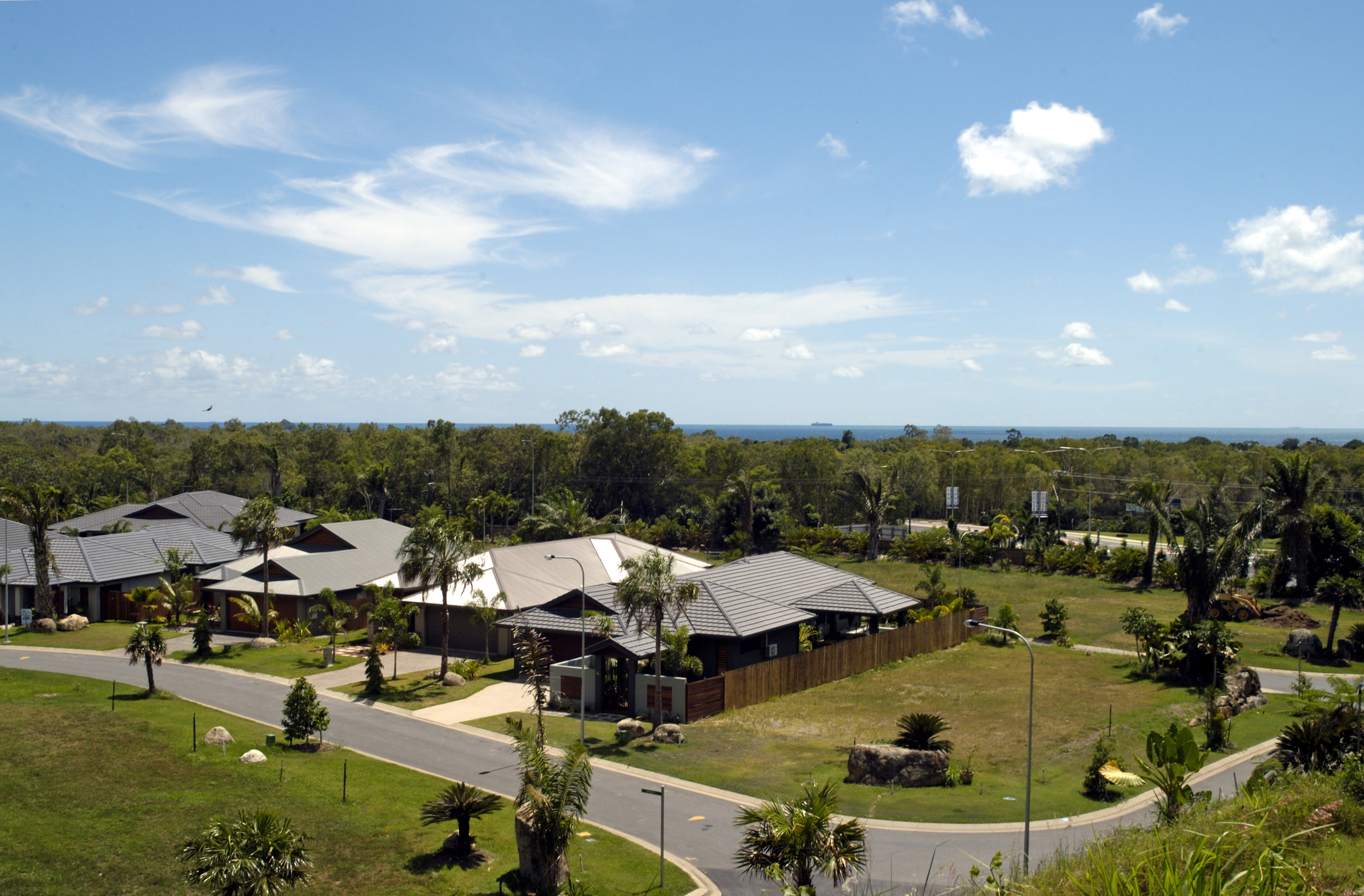
Construction of new residential housing in Cape York districts during the Welfare Reform Trial.

==== Housing ====
The Institute’s trial developed programs to alleviate barriers to home ownership and renting suitable housing for Cape York community members. Legislative changes were made to facilitate tenancy agreements between potential public home renters and private landlords under the Residential Tenancies Act 1994 (QLD). The FRC imposed Conditional obligations under the Income Management Scheme to manage compliance with the agreed rental terms. Breach of the agreement could result in eviction or placement of more stringent income management arrangements upon the renter. To secure private home ownership for the members of the Cape York communities, reforms to housing and land legislation were made throughout the Trial. Amendments to the Aboriginal and Torres Strait Islander Land Act 1991 (QLD) authorised private residential leases for the duration of 99 years, enabling Indigenous Residents seeking to buy or build a home to have access to monetary grants from their respective income providers. In 2008, the Trial's Pride of Place Program was enacted and subject to revision of its implementation procedures later in 2010. The initiative operated throughout the four communities and renovated the backyards of Cape York Residential homes. The renovation was financially subsidised and acted as an incentive for restoring and enhancing the pride of home ownership for Cape York Residents.

==== Review of the Cape York Trial (2013) ====
The Department of Families, Housing, Community Services and Indigenous Affairs (FaHCSIA) and the Social Policy Research Centre conducted an Implementation and Outcomes Review of the Cape York Trial in 2013. Research, survey and census data examined the effectiveness of the Trial in restoring previously collapsed social norms and creating reformed attitudes towards social responsibility, participation in education and the attainment of employment and property.

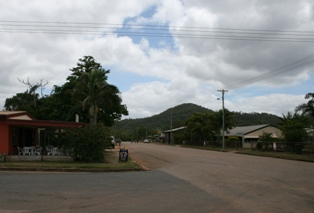
Street View of regional community Coen in Cape York

The early stages of the FRC's operation saw challenges in managing staffing and administration costs, delayed responses in creating facilities to host conferences and limited availability of referral options to determine client eligibility for Conditional Income Management. These functional limitations did not align with the intended design principles of the program outlined in the Hand Out to Hand Up report and impeded the FRC's role to manage Cape York Residents' compliance with obligations pursuant to the Income Management scheme. The Cape York Welfare Reform Evaluation found that the FRC broadened the availability of support services for half of the adult population within all four Cape York trial communities. This enhanced the availability of the FRC's ability to make referrals to conferencing and manage the distribution of welfare resources. Social Change surveys undertaken by the Social Policy Research Centre revealed that 90% of participants claimed to have acted upon the conditional agreements made with convenors,. Following the Trial, the Queensland State Government passed the Social Services Legislation Amendment (Queensland Commission Income Management Regime) Bill 2017 to continue the operation of the Income Management program within Cape York until 30 June 2019. This trial was further extended by the Commonwealth government to 30 June 2021. The operation of the FRC in the communities of Aurukun, Coen, Mossman Gorge and Hope Vale continues as legislated by the Family Responsibilities Commission Amendment Act 2014.

The implementation of the Trial in the education stream gave rise to the establishment of the Cape York Aboriginal Australian Academy (CYAAA) in the communities of Aurukun and Coen in 2010, followed by Hope Vale in 2011. In the three years of operation, the CYAAA's goals to increase primary and secondary student attendance and participation rates were not achieved in the communities of Coen, Hope Vale and Aurukun. The recorded average of attendance levels of schools partnered with the CYAAA improved initially in 2010. In the Trial’s concluding years of 2011 and 2012, participation rates slightly declined in Hope Vale and Coen. Following the trial, school attendance rates in Aurukun and Hope Vale with CYAAA interaction significantly declined, reaching similar levels to the pre-trial period. Areas of progress following the implementation of the CYAAA in Cape York schools was identified from quantitative data in the National Assessment Program - Literacy and Numeracy (NAPLAN) results. For NAPLAN, participating students (from years three to seven) surpassing the national minimum average of test scores in numeracy and literacy increased in number whereby schools received CYAAA assistance. However, consistency of student academic development in reading, writing and numeracy levels varied across campuses in the Cape York communities. For the Coen Campus, a higher mean of results was maintained for a longer period of time compared to schools in Aurukun and Hope Vale. With CYAAA involvement, this trend continued following the end of the Trial.

In the employment and housing sectors, some initiatives and programs were not completely implemented and did not continue following the Trial. According to Census data collected by the Social Policy Research Centre, the employment rate in all four Cape York Communities rose with the transition of CDEP supported employees into 103 full-time jobs and the emergence of 118 new service delivery jobs. In developing Business Districts for creating jobs independent of welfare benefits and generating the growth of local industries, the Trial confronted barriers. The construction of business precincts in Coen and Aurukun were delayed due to disapproval of the initial plans from community leaders, slowing the growth of employment opportunities. In Mossman Gorge and Hope Vale the immediate addition of Business Districts constituted higher rates of economic opportunity growth with a 20.3 and 23.4 percentage increase in employment levels from 2006 to 2011 In the area of housing and management of tenancy arrangements, the Trial implemented 442 rental agreements across the four communities. Under the Pride of Place Program, 32 new houses were constructed and 197 renovations were conducted. The objectives of the Trial in relation to attaining private home ownership did not satisfy requirements outlined in the Hand Out to Hand Up Report. Difficulties in securing the transition of residents from public housing into private home ownership was outlined by the Social Policy Research Centre’s findings, recording no purchase of property in Trial communities of Aurukun, Hope Vale and Mossman Gorge. Following the Trial, the Pride of Place remained in place for some time. In the Trial’s one-year extension in 2013, the Australian Government funded 2.7 million dollars to aid construction of sewerage, water passage and electricity systems, providing incentives for potential home buyers.
