= Community Development Employment Projects =

Australian Government initiative in the 2000s

The Community Development Employment Projects (CDEP) was an initiative by the Australian Government for the employment of Aboriginal and Torres Strait Islander people. It provided a flexible basic income support.

One way in which the CDEP funds, along with those of another federal government program, the Community Housing and Infrastructure Program (CHIP), were deployed was via the Aboriginal and Torres Strait Islander Commission (ATSIC) to outstations (tiny, remote communities, also known as homelands) across the Northern Territory, until ATSIC was dismantled by the Howard government in 2004. Then CDEP was transferred to the Department of Employment and Workplace Relations (2001–2007), which made it much harder to access by outstation residents.

On 23 July 2007, during the Northern Territory National Emergency Response ("the Intervention"), the Howard government announced the abolition of the CDEP scheme in the Northern Territory. The scheme had an estimated 7,500 participants. The Government planned to progressively abolish projects in urban areas of Australia by July 2009, and in remote areas by July 2011.

In July 2009, CDEP was replaced with Job Services Australia in regions with “established economies”. In remote areas, new participants were redirected to income support direct from Centrelink. In the homelands, it was replaced with the Community Development Program, a work-for-the-dole scheme, requiring unemployed people to work five hours a day, five days a week in supervised work or training.
