= Ray Robinson (ATSIC) =

Ray 'Sugar Ray' Robinson was an Australian man who served as Deputy Chairperson of the Aboriginal and Torres Strait Islander Commission from 1996 to 2003.

He resigned at a time when ATSIC was under enhanced scrutiny by the Howard government, then in its third term. He was subject to investigation regarding his conduct as an administrator and board member of a number of Aboriginal organisations.

He was convicted of an offence identified as a result of these investigations in September 2008, but on appeal the Queensland Court of Appeal quashed that conviction and ordered a retrial. In 2011, he was convicted on retrial and placed on a good behaviour bond.

== See also ==
- Geoff Clark (politician)
