= Office of Indigenous Policy Coordination =

Office of Indigenous Policy
Agency overview
- Formed: 1 July 2004
- Preceding agency: Aboriginal and Torres Strait Islander Commission (ATSIC)
- Dissolved: August 2011
- Superseding agency: Department of the Prime Minister and Cabinet Indigenous Affairs Group
- Jurisdiction: Commonwealth of Australia
- Headquarters: Canberra

The Office of Indigenous Policy Coordination (OIPC) was the Australian Government-led unit for the coordination of policy, programs and services for Indigenous Australians from July 2004 to August 2011.

The OIPC was formally established in July 2004 within the Department of Immigration and Multicultural and Indigenous Affairs (DIMIA), in the wake of the dissolution of Aboriginal and Torres Strait Islander Commission (ATSIC). It was formally dissolved in August 2011 when its functions were integrated within the divisions and branches of the Department of Families, Housing, Community Services and Indigenous Affairs (FaHCSIA).

== History ==
The Office of Indigenous Policy Coordination was formally established on 1 July 2004 within the Department of Immigration and Multicultural and Indigenous Affairs to replace ATSIC and its associated services. With the machinery of government changes in January 2006, the OIPC was transferred to the newly established Department of Families, Community Services and Indigenous Affairs (FaCSIA).

After the change of government in December 2007, the portfolio was renamed the Department of Families, Housing, Community Services and Indigenous Affairs (FaHCSIA), and the coordination of the Indigenous Coordination Centres and some program management responsibilities were integrated throughout the department. Throughout the existence of the OIPC within FaHCSIA, responsibilities for policy development, program management and service delivery were increasingly mainstreamed and integrated across distinct divisions and branches. The Rudd government also established the Coordinator-General of Remote Indigenous Services in 2009 to coordinate service delivery to remote Indigenous communities.

The OIPC was formally disbanded in name and integrated into the Indigenous Policy and Engagement Division of FaHCSIA in August 2011.

FaHCSIA was discontinued with the election of the Abbott government in September 2013, with the transfer of Indigenous affairs to the Department of the Prime Minister and Cabinet and the creation of the Indigenous Affairs Group.

== Responsibilities ==
The OIPC was responsible for whole-of-government Indigenous policy development and service delivery and managed a regional network of Indigenous Coordination Centres across states and territories. The OIPC also worked with state and territory governments through Council of Australian Governments (COAG) arrangements.
