= Kennards Hire =

Australian equipment hire company

- Formerly: W Kennard Industries; W Kennard Agencies
- Company type: Private company
- Industry: Equipment rental
- Founded: 1948; 78 years ago
- Founder: Walter Kennard
- Headquarters: Sydney, Australia
- Number of locations: 146 (2021)
- Area served: Australia; New Zealand
- Owner: Kennard family
- Number of employees: 1,500 (2017)
- Website: kennards.com.au

Kennards Hire is an Australian privately-owned equipment hire company.

== History ==
=== W Kennard Agencies ===
In 1948 Walter Kennard founded W Kennard Agencies in Bathurst selling equipment and machinery and becoming an agent for Caltex, Hillman, Humber and Lightburn. The concept of an equipment hire business came about when instead of a customer purchasing a concrete mixer, Kennard rented the equipment for a fee. In 1951 the Kennard family moved to Sydney with W Kennard Agencies operating out of the garage of the family home in Mosman.

Having diversified into the manufacture of roof racks, in 1954 the business was rebranded as W Kennard Industries with operations relocated to Dickson Avenue, Artarmon, then in 1960 to the Pacific Highway, Greenwich. In 1967 a second branch opened on Victoria Road, Rydalmere followed in 1969 by a third on Botany Road, Alexandria. In 1972 the Greenwich branch was relocated to Herbert Street, Artarmon.

=== Kennards Self Storage ===
In 1973, Kennards diversified into the self storage sector with six self store garages built at the rear of the Moorebank hire store. Initially branded as Kennards Mini Storage it was renamed Easi-Stor in 1979. By 1990 Kennards had 14 branches in Sydney, Newcastle and Brisbane.

In 1991, Andy and Neville Kennard who had taken over the business from their father, Walter, decided to split the business, with Andy retaining the hire equipment business and Neville taking the self storage business.

=== Kennards Hire ===
In 1992, Kennards Hire purchased eight stores from GKN; and purchased the remaining 10 GKN stores two years later. Through a series of acquisitions and greenfield developments, by the year 2000, Kennards Hire had a presence in all mainland states; and, through acquisition, entered the New Zealand market in 2012. As of 2021, there were 146 branches, across Australia and New Zealand.

Since 2017, Kennards Hire has been the naming rights sponsor of Sydney FC.

== See also ==
- Kennards Self Storage
