= Advance (lobby group) =

Conservative political lobby group in Australia

- Formation: 2018; 8 years ago
- Purpose: Conservative political campaigning
- Headquarters: Brisbane, Queensland, Australia
- Members: 306,000 (2024)
- Website: advanceaustralia.org.au

Advance, stylised as ADVANCE and formerly known as Advance Australia, is a conservative political lobbying group in Australia. It was launched in 2018 to counter the progressive lobbying group GetUp. It has close links to the Liberal Party, and targeted the Labor Party, Greens, and teal independents in the 2025 federal election.

== History ==
Advance Australia was launched in 2018, with the express purpose of countering GetUp, a left-wing Australian lobbying group. In its first four months, Advance Australia raised A$395,000 and signed up 27,500 members.

The national director of Advance Australia was Gerard Benedet, a former Liberal Party staffer who led the organisation during the 2019 Australian federal election. Benedet stood down in September 2019, and was replaced by Liz Storer, former City of Gosnells councillor, and advisor to ex-Liberal senator Zed Seselja. Former Prime Minister Tony Abbott has provided strategic advice to the organisation. Matthew Sheahan serves as executive director and has been described as the "main man" behind Advance.

By May 2019, it had raised $1.7 million, according to Benedet. It raised money through donations on its website. Benedet said that the membership was 60 per cent male and had an average age of about 50.

High-profile backers have included businessmen such as Maurice Newman, Kennards Self Storage managing director Sam Kennard, and Australian Jewish Association president David Adler. Other members of the advisory council have included security specialist Sean Jacobs and journalist Kerry Wakefield. Queensland businessman James Power was also involved.

As of May 2023 the group had been renamed simply "Advance".

== Leadership, funding, and membership ==
As of 2019 Advance Australia's independence had not been tested by the Australian Electoral Commission (AEC) in the same manner as similar lobby groups. Advance's leadership is largely composed of former Liberal Party operatives and has employed the likes of Liberal Party Senator Jacinta Nampijinpa Price.

In 2022–2023 Advance raised A$5.2 million in donations, according to the Australian Electoral Commission (AEC). This was more than $2.5 million it received in 2021–2022.

It has received funding from the Liberal Party-linked Cormack Foundation, which donated $500,000 to Advance, from Gina Reinhardt, and $655,000 from members of the Exclusive Brethren religious sect.

As of June 2024 the group's supporters numbered around 306,000.

== Policies ==
The group has stated that it opposes left-wing activists who it says are trying to change the Australian way of life. It decries radicalism and political correctness, espousing what it calls "mainstream values". In 2019 it promoted family values, free markets, meritocracy, business, a Judeo-Christian heritage, a strong defence force, and national borders.

The group believes that anthropogenic climate change is a "hoax", with national director Liz Storer in 2020 describing the teaching of the predominant scientific view as "the other side of the story being shoved down their throats... The left have infiltrated our education systems."

== Campaigns ==
=== Online petitions ===
The earliest campaigns of Advance Australia included online petitions to:

- Keep Australia Day on January 26 to mark the anniversary of the First Fleet's arrival
- Oppose plans by the Labor Party to scrap dividend imputation tax refunds for retirees with superannuation
- Oppose targets set by the Labor Party to reduce carbon-dioxide emissions.

=== Climate campaigns ===
Advance Australia's national director Liz Storer vowed upon her appointment in September 2019 to target the "militant advance of climate activism" and in particular, the protest group Extinction Rebellion, whom she described as "criminals who pose a menace to society".

In 2020, Advance Australia commenced a campaign aimed at children with an e-book titled 10 climate facts to expose the climate change hoax. They claim that a "consensus" goes against the "scientific method" and that there are many recognised scientists who do not agree that human generation of CO_{2} is the "control knob" of climate. The group are seeking to have their material distributed in classrooms. However the New South Wales Department of Education has stated it would not allow Advance Australia's in schools as they are not objective and would be in violation of the Controversial Issues in Schools policy. The Victorian Education Minister James Merlino has described the book as "rubbish", adding "this organisation is a front for a group of ill-informed climate change deniers".

In early 2023, Advance led an online petition to oppose net zero plans by the government

In 2024, Advance, along with the Liberal Party, ran a campaign against the Albanese government's policy to introduce fuel efficiency standards for vehicles. The group claimed, wrongly, that this policy was a tax, and published an advertisement featuring a picture of National Farmers Federation president David Jochinke without his permission. The farmers' lobby said that it did not share Advance's policies on climate change, and that it was committed to the government's net zero target.

In November 2025, Advance continued to campaign against net zero plans, launching an online campaign to pressure Liberal Party MPs to drop support for net zero targets. Earlier in the month, the Nationals abandoned their net zero commitments and proposed Australia instead follow OECD averages for emissions reductions and focus on adaptation. On the 13th of November the Liberal Party announced it would abandon the target of net zero emissions by 2050 but remain in the Paris Agreement.

=== 2019 federal election ===
During the 2019 federal election campaign:

- Costumed characters named Captain GetUp and Freddie Foreign Money appeared in electorates where GetUp was trying to unseat Liberals who had been key supporters of a leadership challenge by Peter Dutton
- A documentary-style series was launched on social media attacking GetUp.

=== 2022 federal election ===
During the 2022 federal election campaign:

- a truck featuring a giant billboard with a picture of Chinese leader and CCP general secretary Xi Jinping casting his primary vote for Labor. Beside him, the words "CCP (Chinese Communist Party) says vote Labor".
- corflute signs attacking David Pocock, an Independent candidate for a Senate seat in the 2022 Australian federal election. The signs implied that he was secretly a Greens candidate, by showing him in a "Superman" pose tearing his shirt to reveal the Greens logo. Pocock complained to the Australian Electoral Commission about this inference. Advance Australia agreed to stop displaying the signs at the request of the AEC, who believed they were in breach of the Commonwealth Electoral Act 1918.

=== 2022–2023 Indigenous Voice to Parliament ===
Advance set up campaigns to oppose the Voice to Parliament, encouraging voters to vote No in the 2023 referendum on the matter. Its campaigns include a new social media advertising campaign titled "The Voice is Not Enough" (or just "Not Enough"), aimed at a young demographic and targeting the "progressive no" vote, suggesting that the Voice would be too weak, or was not the main priority for Aboriginal and Torres Strait Islander people. As part of this campaign, they misrepresented the views of some Indigenous people and used others' photos without their permission. It has also created a "Referendum News" Facebook page, which showed only anti-Voice posts, and by May 2023 the group had spent thousands of dollars on Facebook and Instagram ads.

In July 2023, a cartoon ad run by Advance in the Australian Financial Review, featuring caricatures of Yes campaigner Thomas Mayo, MP and Yes advocate Kate Chaney, and her father businessman Michael Chaney, led to bipartisan condemnation of the ad as "racist". The AFR later apologised for publishing the ad.

=== 2024 Dunkley by-election ===
Advance spent nearly $300,000 running advertising against Labor in the 2024 by-election for the federal seat of Dunkley in southeastern Melbourne, triggered by the death of sitting Labor MP Peta Murphy. Its campaign was described variously as ‘Trumpian’, ‘misinformation’ and a ‘fear campaign.’ Despite Advance's efforts, Labor held the seat.

=== 2025 federal election ===
Advance were the highest-spending lobby group during the lead-up to the 2025 Australian election, spending A$1,762,435 on advertising that mostly targeted seats that could be won by the Australian Greens.Advance also ran campaigns against "Teal" independents. Typically these were derogatory, personal and misleading.

== Reception ==
The group has been criticised for distributing misinformation and for purportedly campaigning for the Liberal Party, to which Advance has close links. it has been criticised for not revealing where much of its funding comes from and for criticising ‘elites’, while receiving significant funding from the rich and powerful.

In April 2025, The Age and The Sydney Morning Herald published articles investigating 'behind Advance’s propaganda machine – and its deluge of disinformation – are links to the far right in the US.' It outlined how Advance has copied American-style 'MAGA model' campaigning to claim independence, when most of its staff come from right-wing political parties, how it claims to be publicly funded, while most of its money comes from billionaires, and how it shares known disinformation, like the false claim that offshore wind farms kill whales.

In July 2025, Advance was criticised for repurposing footage of identifiable children without obtaining consent in an ad attacking Welcome to Country ceremonies.

SBS News wrote that Advance uses social media to post anti-Muslim and anti-immigrant content and is opposed to the Welcome to Country ceremony and what it calls "mass immigration" in Australia.
