= 2023 Australian Indigenous Voice referendum =

- 14 October 2023
- A Proposed Law: To alter the Constitution to recognise the First Peoples of Australia by establishing an Aboriginal and Torres Strait Islander Voice. Do you approve this proposed alteration?
- Outcome: Not carried. A majority "no" vote nationally and in all states.
- Website: Official results

Results
Choice	Votes	%
Yes	6,286,894	39.94%
No	9,452,792	60.06%
Valid votes	15,739,686	99.02%
Invalid or blank votes	155,545	0.98%
Total votes	15,895,231	100.00%
Registered voters/turnout	17,671,784	89.95%
- Results by state or territory, and division

The 2023 Australian Indigenous Voice referendum was a constitutional referendum held on 14 October 2023 in which the proposed Aboriginal and Torres Strait Islander Voice was rejected. Voters were asked to approve an alteration to the Australian Constitution that would recognise Indigenous Australians in the document through prescribing a body called the Aboriginal and Torres Strait Islander Voice that would have been able to make representations to Federal Parliament and the executive government on "matters relating to Aboriginal and Torres Strait Islander peoples".

The proposal was rejected nationally and by a majority in every state, thus failing to secure the double majority required for amendment by section 128 of the constitution. The Australian Capital Territory was the only state or territory with a majority of "yes" votes. Analysis of surveys following the referendum identified the main reasons why the majority of Australians voted no was a scepticism of granting rights to some Australians that are not held by others and an aversion to constitutional change.

== Background ==
On 21 May 2022, the Australian Labor Party won the federal election, with party leader Anthony Albanese becoming Prime Minister. During his victory speech, Albanese committed to the Uluru Statement from the Heart in full.

=== Parliamentary process ===
Constitution Alteration (Aboriginal and Torres Strait Islander Voice) 2023

Parliament of Australia
- Long title: A Bill for an Act to alter the Constitution to recognise the First Peoples of Australia by establishing an Aboriginal and Torres Strait Islander Voice
- Territorial extent: Australia
- Passed by: House of Representatives
- Passed: 31 May 2023
- Passed by: Senate
- Passed: 19 June 2023

Legislative history

Initiating chamber: House of Representatives
- Introduced by: Mark Dreyfus
- Introduced: 30 March 2023
- First reading: 30 March 2023
- Second reading: 30 March 2023 – 31 May 2023
- Consideration in detail: 31 May 2023
- Third reading: 31 May 2023

Revising chamber: Senate
- Received from the House of Representatives: 13 June 2023
- Member(s) in charge: Murray Watt
- First reading: 13 June 2023
- Second reading: 13 June 2023 – 16 June 2023
- Committee of the whole: 16 June 2023 – 17 June 2023
- Third reading: 19 June 2023

Amends
- Constitution of Australia

Summary
- Amends the constitution to prescribe an Indigenous Voice to Parliament
- Status: Not passed

The Albanese government settled on the text of the question on the ballot and the actual amendment and announced them on 23 March 2023. These were formally approved by parliament through the passage of the amendment bill, Constitutional Alteration (Aboriginal and Torres Strait Islander Voice) 2023 (Cth). The bill was examined and endorsed by the Joint Select Committee on the Aboriginal and Torres Strait Islander Voice Referendum, subject to two dissenting reports authored by Liberal and National party members respectively.

The Liberal Party of Australia report put forward several changes, including the deletion of sub-section 128(ii) (to reduce a risk that representations from the body must be considered), a new section 77(iv) (to allow the parliament to control the applicability of judicial review under section 75(v) of the Constitution), the addition of the words "and the legal effect of its representations" to sub-section 128(iii) (to clarify the power Parliament has to legislate regarding the Voice), and the replacement of the words "executive government" to "ministers of state" (to reduce the possible ambit of people to whom the Voice may make representations). The Nationals' report, on the other hand, rejected the proposed bill entirely.

Following the passage of the bill, the referendum date was announced by the Prime Minister on 30 August 2023. The referendum was officially triggered on 11 September 2023 with the issuing of a writ by the governor-general to the Australian Electoral Commission.

== Question ==
Referendum ballot papers asked voters:

A Proposed Law: To alter the Constitution to recognise the First Peoples of Australia by establishing an Aboriginal and Torres Strait Islander Voice. Do you approve this proposed alteration?

== Proposed changes to the Constitution ==
The proposed amendment to the Constitution was the insertion of the following chapter:

Chapter IX Recognition of Aboriginal and Torres Strait Islander Peoples

129 Aboriginal and Torres Strait Islander Voice

In recognition of Aboriginal and Torres Strait Islander peoples as the First Peoples of Australia:

1. There shall be a body, to be called the Aboriginal and Torres Strait Islander Voice;
2. The Aboriginal and Torres Strait Islander Voice may make representations to the Parliament and the Executive Government of the Commonwealth on matters relating to Aboriginal and Torres Strait Islander peoples;
3. The Parliament shall, subject to this Constitution, have power to make laws with respect to matters relating to the Aboriginal and Torres Strait Islander Voice, including its composition, functions, powers and procedures.

== Voting and referendum mechanisms ==
=== Double majority ===
For any amendment of the Constitution to proceed, it must receive a double majority of votes: that is, a majority in each of a majority of the states (i.e. at least four of the six states), as well as a majority overall (i.e. including votes in the territories).

=== Voters ===
Voting in the referendum was mandatory for all eligible Australian citizens (and some British subjects). A total of 17,676,347 voters were registered on the electoral roll, and therefore required to either vote in person, by post or by phone. This was 2.6% larger than the electoral roll of the 2022 election.

=== Cost ===
The Australian Electoral Commission (AEC) estimated the cost of the referendum would be about $450 million, where the federal government had supplied $364 million in the most recent budget to deliver the referendum. Funding for the referendum was provided to the AEC and National Indigenous Australians Agency in the October 2022 Australian federal budget, with a total distribution of $75.2 million (excluding Contingency Reserves) over two years (FY2022–24).

- $52.6 million for the Australian Electoral Commission to prepare for and deliver the referendum
- $16.1 million for the Australian Electoral Commission to increase the percentage of eligible First Nations people enrolled to vote
- $6.5 million for the National Indigenous Australians Agency to support preparations for the referendum, including the relevant governance structures

There is an additional $160 million of the federal Contingency Reserve available to deliver the referendum. In May 2023 the government announced a total of $10.5 million in the 2023 budget to improve mental health services for Indigenous people in the lead-up to the referendum.

The final cost of the referendum was confirmed to be $411,269,848.

=== Official pamphlet ===
The government originally attempted to remove the requirement for an official yes/no pamphlet along with other proposed changes to the referendum process in the Referendum (Machinery Provisions) Amendment Bill 2022 (Cth), arguing that a physical pamphlet was outdated and that information could instead be distributed online or via television. Instead, the government proposed funding an education campaign to inform Australians about the referendum and to "counter misinformation". However, the pamphlet was ultimately retained in order to secure bipartisan support for the bill. Following this, parliamentarians of both houses who had voted for and against the constitutional amendment bill drafted, for inclusion in the pamphlet, 2,000-word essays detailing their Yes and No cases, with the text of each essay approved by a majority respectively of the Yes and No supporters. This approach was criticised by organisations such as The Greens, who wanted these statements to be independently fact-checked, as there was no legal requirement for the pamphlets to be truthful. After the pamphlets were released, several media organisations analysed the claims in both essays, with many characterising some in the No case as "false" or "misleading". No campaigners disputed this, however, arguing that fact checkers were labelling as "false" claims that remained subject to debate.

The yes/no pamphlet was published on the AEC website on 18 July 2023 and on 11 August 2023 it began to be posted to households.

=== Key dates ===
Key dates in relation to the voting process for the referendum were:

- 11 September – Writ issued
- 11 September – Applications for postal voting opens
- 18 September (8pm) – Close of electoral roll (17,676,347 people were enrolled at the close of the roll)
- 25 September – Remote voting commences
- 2 October – Early voting centres open in Northern Territory, Tasmania, Victoria and Western Australia
- 3 October (Note: Due to public holidays: Labor Day in ACT, NSW, SA; King's Birthday in Qld) – Early voting centres open in Australian Capital Territory, New South Wales, Queensland and South Australia.
- 11 October (6pm) – Applications for postal voting closes
- 14 October – Referendum day
- 27 October – Last day for receipt of postal votes
- 6 November – Writ returned

== Proposed design of the Voice ==
On 23 March 2023 the Australian Cabinet endorsed a set of design principles that would be used in the design of the Voice in the event the referendum is successful, with Prime Minister Anthony Albanese stating that these principles would "underpin the shape and function of the Voice". Additionally he stated that if the referendum is successful, another process would be established to work on the final design, with a subsequent government produced information pamphlet stating that this process would involve Indigenous Australian communities, the Parliament and the broader community, with any legislation going through normal parliamentary scrutiny procedures.

These principles stated that the Voice would be "proactive" and "independent" when giving advice to both Parliament and the government, Voice members would be chosen according to "the wishes of local communities" and "representative" being gender balanced and including remote and youth representatives. Additionally, the Voice would be "community-led, inclusive, respectful and culturally informed". Also, the Voice would be subject to standard transparency measures, would exist in addition to current organisations, would not deliver programs nor have a "veto power".

== Positions ==
=== Political parties ===
The following tables summarise the positions of registered political parties at the federal level. Disagreement between federal party rooms and state-level party branches within the Liberal–National Coalition is discussed below.

==== Parliamentary parties ====
Party	Stance	Notes and references
Centre Alliance	Unknown	The party did not openly take a stance on the issue, but does support the recognition of Indigenous Australians in the Constitution.
Dai Le & Frank Carbone	Neutral	As of January 2023, Dai Le (the party's only federal representative) maintained a neutral position towards the Voice, claiming that it is not a priority for the culturally diverse communities in her electorate.
Greens	Support	The party has a preference for truth-telling and treaty processes to occur prior to the Voice but have nonetheless backed the "yes" campaign for the referendum on the Voice. The party's First Nations Network (aka Blak Greens) encouraged members to abstain or vote no, on the basis that the Voice would be a "powerless advisory body".
Katter's Australian	Oppose	KAP MP Bob Katter (federal member for Kennedy) stated that the Voice to Parliament may not cover important issues faced by Indigenous Australians, instead proposing a designated Indigenous senator. However, he has given his support for a referendum. All three of the party's MPs in the Legislative Assembly of Queensland requested more information from federal and state governments (similar to the Liberals) and said that they could possibly support the Voice. On 16 February 2023, the party announced on Facebook that its MPs would not support the Voice.
Labor	Support	Leader Anthony Albanese has given his support and pledged that a referendum would be held. All state and territory Labor leaders support the Voice, however Queensland Premier Annastacia Palaszczuk has said that although she supports the Voice, she believes it should be explained better.
Lambie	Support	Having publicly called for more information about the Voice to Parliament in August 2022 and February 2023, party leader Jacqui Lambie expressed support for the Voice in May 2023, and disappointment at opinion polling indicating a decline in public support in August 2023.
Liberal	Oppose	Federal leader Peter Dutton had requested more information before his party decided on a position; however some members declared their own stances. Federal members of the party's Tasmanian branch were divided on the issue as of 3 January 2023. On 5 April 2023, after a party room meeting, it was announced that the party will oppose the Voice citing constitutional risks. All members of the shadow ministry are bound by this decision but a conscience vote is allowed for backbencher members. The party also proposed an alternative to Labor's initial proposal and supports constitutional recognition of Indigenous Australians. After the decision, some members of the party indicated they would still support a Voice to Parliament despite their party room's position. Moderate backbenchers including Bridget Archer and Andrew Bragg as well as conservative backbencher Russell Broadbent indicated their support for a Voice. Furthermore, Julian Leeser resigned from his frontbench position as Shadow Attorney-General to support a Voice.
National	Oppose	The Nationals at a federal level stated that they oppose a Voice to Parliament, citing concerns that it would not be inclusive of regional areas.
One Nation	Oppose	One Nation opposes both a Voice to Parliament and a referendum on the subject.
United Australia Party	Oppose	Following the "If you don't know, VOTE NO" slogan, the United Australia Party stated "[we] will not support a constitutional change that divides us by race."

==== Non-parliamentary parties ====
Party	Stance	Notes and references
Animal Justice	Support	
Democrats	Support	
Christians	Oppose	
Democratic Alliance	Support	
Fusion	Support	
Indigenous-Aboriginal	Support	
Legalise Cannabis	Unknown	Rachel Payne announced that the Victorian state branch of the party supports a Voice to Parliament in May 2023, but the party did not make its position clear at a federal level.
Liberal Democratic Party	Oppose	
Reason	Support	
Socialist Alliance	Support	The Socialist Alliance recommended a 'critical Yes' vote, expressing concern that the Voice would have served as a token gesture towards the recognition of First Nations' sovereignty and treaty demands. They considered grassroot activism important in ensuring that "...First Nations people's quest for justice can overcome either constraint by a bureaucratic Voice or demoralisation by a majority No vote."
Sustainable Australia	Support	
TNL	Support	
Victorian Socialists	Support	Victorian Socialists said in a statement that it encouraged its members to vote Yes in the Voice referendum. The party also said that although a victory for the Yes side would not represent a major step forward for Indigenous rights, a No victory is likely to be a step backwards; as the No campaign has gained momentum, "racist elements have come to the fore".
Western Australia Party	Oppose	

==== Different stances within the Coalition ====
Nationals leader David Littleproud announced on 28 November 2022 that his party would not support the Voice, with Senator for the Northern Territory Jacinta Price speaking out strongly against it. The decision led to Andrew Gee leaving the party to sit as an independent. The Nationals oppose the Voice on a federal level and in two states (South Australia and Victoria), although the party supports it in New South Wales, and Western Australia.

Federally, the Liberal Party opposed the Voice, with leader Peter Dutton repeatedly asking for more information before they could make a decision, before deciding on 5 April 2023 to reject the Voice. The Liberals offered an alternative proposal and do support the constitutional recognition of Indigenous Australians. Only backbenchers have been allowed a conscience vote on the issue, while members of the Coalition Shadow Ministry are obliged to oppose the Voice. Despite the Liberal Party's federal position, the party is supportive of the Voice in New South Wales and Tasmania. The Western Australian branch was initially supportive, but changed their position in August 2023. On 3 September, Dutton committed to hold a second referendum on Indigenous recognition if the Voice referendum failed, while also expressing support for his party's election proposal for a series of legislated local bodies (without a national one).

Former Liberal MP, and Indigenous Australians Minister, Ken Wyatt, quit the Liberal Party on 6 April 2023, in response to the Federal Liberal Party's opposition to the Voice. Later, Julian Leeser (the member for Berowra) resigned from the Shadow Cabinet to support the Voice and campaign for an improved wording, although he did not quit the party and still remains in Parliament as a Liberal backbencher.

Since the resignation of Dominic Perrottet (a supporter of the Voice) as leader of the NSW Liberal Party after he led the party to defeat at the 2023 state election, most of the support for the Voice from Liberal members has come from Tasmania or from backbenchers, despite state branches refusing to bind their party or frontbenches by a stance (despite the federal Coalition binding its shadow ministers to oppose the Voice). Of other state Liberal leaders, New South Wales leader Mark Speakman supports the Voice, while Western Australian leader Libby Mettam initially supported the Voice, but then began opposing it due to the state's controversial Aboriginal heritage laws. The Liberals for Yes campaign was launched in 2023 as an attempt to attract support for the Voice from centre-right, liberal conservative individuals.

Similar to New South Wales, the Victorian Liberal Party allowed its members a conscience vote on the issue. The Victorian branch did not declare its stance on the Voice. However, party leader John Pesutto confirmed his personal stance and other members have voiced their personal opinions (see below).

Party	Stance	Notes and references
Canberra Liberals	Ambiguous	The Canberra Liberals gave its MPs a conscience vote on the issue. The party's leader, Elizabeth Lee, supports the Voice. Mark Parton has announced his support for the Voice, while former opposition leader Jeremy Hanson has announced his opposition to the proposal.
Country Liberal	Oppose	On 19 February 2023, the Country Liberal Party's rank-and-file voted to oppose the Voice. However, members of the party have differing opinions; the party's sole federal senator, Jacinta Price, opposes the Voice, while the party's leader in the Northern Territory, Lia Finocchiaro, said in mid-March that she supported the Voice in principle, but needed more detail. However, on 22 August, Finocchiaro confirmed that she would be voting "no", saying the government had not given enough information about the Voice and she was concerned that the Voice would not adequately represent Aboriginal Territorians, though she also said that party members were allowed a free vote on the issue and that she would not be campaigning against the Voice.
Liberal National	Ambiguous	The LNP did not state a clear position on the Voice. The party's leader in Queensland, David Crisafulli, announced he has an "open mind" on the issue. Crisafulli later announced that he would oppose the Voice, but the LNP would be given a conscience vote on the issue and that he would not be campaigning against it.
NSW Liberals	Ambiguous	Former New South Wales Premier Dominic Perrottet (who was Premier and Liberal leader from 2021 to 2023) supports the Voice. The current leader, Mark Speakman, announced that members of the party will be given a free vote on the issue. On 12 August 2023, Speakman announced that he personally supports the Voice, but would not be campaigning for it.
NSW Nationals	Oppose	The NSW Nationals opposed the Voice, formally opposing it at their Senior Party Conference in July 2023. However, like the NSW Liberal Party, the NSW Nationals announced that they would give their members a free vote on the issue.
SA Liberals	Oppose	The South Australian division opposes the state's version of the Voice to Parliament, but did not made a stance on the federal version. David Speirs remains undecided on the Voice, but has stated that the South Australian Liberals will remain neutral and would not campaign for either side. However, Speirs later stated that he and the party would oppose the Voice.
SA Nationals	Oppose	
Tasmanian Liberals	Support	Tasmanian premier Jeremy Rockliff openly supports the Voice. Rockliff vowed to campaign "vigorously" in favour of the Voice.
Victorian Liberals	Ambiguous	John Pesutto, the leader of the party's Victorian division, was initially unclear on the party's position citing a lack of detail on the proposal. The Victorian Liberals decided in May 2023 to allow members to have a conscience vote on this issue. Only Jess Wilson, the Member for Kew, has publicly confirmed she will vote "yes" in the referendum, while the majority of Victorian Liberal MPs have publicly stated they will vote "no". On 4 September, Pesutto declared that he will be voting "no" in the referendum but would not be campaigning against it.
Victorian Nationals	Oppose	Peter Walsh, the leader of the Nationals in Victoria, backed the federal Nationals' decision.
WA Liberals	Oppose	Libby Mettam, the leader of the party's Western Australian division, announced the party's opposition in August 2023. She had previously endorsed the Voice.
WA Nationals	Oppose	Former leader Mia Davies stated her party's support for the Voice during her time as leader. While current leader Shane Love initially supported the Voice, he later announced that he and the party would oppose the Voice, following a similar decision made earlier by the WA Liberal Party.

=== Independents ===
Name	Stance	Notes and references
Kate Chaney	Support	
Zoe Daniel	Support	
Andrew Gee	Support	Gee defected from the National Party in December 2022, shortly after the party announced its opposition to the Voice, citing a need to support the Voice as a key reason for leaving the party, although party leader David Littleproud mentioned other disagreements that led to the decision.
Helen Haines	Support	
David Pocock	Support	
Monique Ryan	Support	
Sophie Scamps	Support	Scamps referred to the First Nations Voice to Parliament as a "generous invitation" in her first speech to Parliament in August 2022.
Allegra Spender	Support	
Zali Steggall	Support	
Lidia Thorpe	Oppose	In August 2022, when still Greens Indigenous affairs spokesperson, Thorpe called for Treaty before Voice. Defecting from the Greens in February 2023, she said that she wished to lead the "Blak sovereignty" movement and campaign for such a treaty before implementation of the Voice, which would be "powerless". (Note: She also suggested that all of the recommendations from the Bringing Them Home report and Royal Commission into Aboriginal Deaths in Custody should be implemented before the Voice.) In May 2023, she ruled out supporting the No campaign and said she would consider abstaining. On 20 June Thorpe joined the official No campaign, after she had voted No to the referendum bill in the Senate on 19 June. On 20 July, Thorpe released her own pamphlet advocating against the Voice, criticising both the official Yes and No pamphlets, and claiming that she had been unfairly excluded from contributing to the official No case, which she condemned as racist.
Kylea Tink	Support	
Andrew Wilkie	Support	

=== Former prime ministers ===
Prime Minister	Term	Party	Position	Notes and references
Paul Keating	1991–1996	Labor	Support	Paul Keating strongly supported the Voice.
John Howard	1996–2007	Coalition	Oppose	After initially not settling on a position, John Howard stated in an interview with The Australian that the Voice will "create a new cockpit of conflict about how to help Indigenous people".
Kevin Rudd	2007–2010, 2013	Labor	Support	Kevin Rudd supported the Voice to Parliament, stating that Tony Abbott's stance on the issue was "wrong".
Julia Gillard	2010–2013	Labor	Support	Julia Gillard supported the Voice, along with Beyond Blue, which she was then-chairing.
Tony Abbott	2013–2015	Coalition	Oppose	Tony Abbott opposed the Voice.
Malcolm Turnbull	2015–2018	Coalition	Support	In August 2022, Malcolm Turnbull stated that despite his previous concerns, he would vote in favour of Albanese's proposal.
Scott Morrison	2018–2022	Coalition	Oppose	While he was prime minister, Scott Morrison proposed legislated local and regional voices, but repeatedly ruled out holding a referendum on a constitutional voice.

=== Newspaper endorsements ===
Newspaper	City	Owner	Endorsement
The Age	Melbourne	Nine Entertainment	Yes
The Australian	Nationwide	News Corp	No
Herald Sun	Melbourne	News Corp	No
The Spectator Australia	Nationwide	Press Holdings	No
The Sydney Morning Herald	Sydney	Nine Entertainment	Yes

== Legal commentary ==
Former High Court Justice Ian Callinan

Legal opinion in Australia was divided over the suitability of the wording of the proposed constitutional amendment.

=== Concerns ===
One sticking point among experts was the inclusion of the phrase "executive government". In Australia, "executive government" comprises ministers as well as the departments they oversee. It is a broad term, which covers a wide range of people from the governor-general to the cabinet and public servants. Opponents argued that it makes it possible that the whole of the federal government, including its agencies, would be under an obligation to consult the Voice, and that the wording could allow judges to make rulings about its nature. Anne Twomey argued that there is no such obligation in the proposal, and that past High Court rulings have found that the term extends to ministers and government departments, but not statutory bodies, which are distinct legal entities. Noel Pearson also stressed the importance of talking to the public service as well as politicians in effecting change.

On 3 April 2023, shadow attorney-general Julian Leeser outlined his concerns about the words "executive government" in proposed sub-clause 129(ii) during an address at the National Press Club, namely that the meaning of the words is unclear and may be interpreted by the High Court in a way unexpected and unable to be modified later by legislation. He also expressed concerns with the preambular statement "In recognition of Aboriginal and Torres Strait Islander Peoples as the First Peoples of Australia:" as its judicial interpretation is unclear. However, despite these concerns, Leeser stated he would vote yes and continued to campaign for a successful referendum, after resigning from shadow cabinet.

Some constitutional law academics and judges voiced concerns about the introductory words to the proposed new section 129. Retired superior court judges, including David Jackson, Nicholas Hasluck, and Terry Cole, suggested that the changes could have unintended effects and would introduce inequality of citizenship into the Constitution. Former High Court Justice Ian Callinan had said that the changes were legally unsafe.

In May 2023 constitutional law professors Nicholas Aroney and Peter Gerangelos highlighted what they believed were a number of issues with the proposed constitutional amendment in a submission to the Joint Select Committee, suggesting that the Voice may be seen by the High Court as having a similar constitutional status as the Parliament, executive and the High Court. In October 2023 a paper by Aroney and lawyer Peter Congdon highlighted that the proposed alteration to the Constitution had the potential to significantly expand the powers of the Commonwealth over the states, citing the examples of raising the age of criminal responsibility to reduce rates of Indigenous incarceration, or legislating land management issues affecting farmers and Indigenous people. They wrote that neither side had mentioned this issue.

Vice-president of the Rule of Law Institute of Australia Chris Merritt suggested that the proposal would "clearly restrict the sovereign power of the Commonwealth in a way that nobody has even considered".

=== Support for the proposed wording ===
The Constitutional Expert Group appointed by the government to provide advice about constitutional law relating to the Voice (comprising Greg Craven, Megan Davis, Kenneth Hayne, Noel Pearson, Cheryl Saunders, Anne Twomey, George Williams, and Asmi Wood) were unanimous in their opinion that the Voice would not have veto powers over legislation. Other constitutional experts backed the proposal as a "safe and sensible" legal option. Former High Court judge Kenneth Hayne wrote that the Voice would not obstruct the government's function. George Williams, law professor at the University of New South Wales agreed, calling the proposal a modest one. The Law Council of Australia supported the model, calling it a "modest step".

The Solicitor-General of Australia Stephen Donaghue advised that the Voice would "not fetter or impede the exercise of existing powers of Parliament... and is not just compatible with the system of representative and responsible government prescribed by the Constitution, but an enhancement of that system". He also advised that the Voice would help in "overcoming barriers that have historically impeded effective participation by Aboriginal and Torres Strait Islander peoples in political discussions and decisions that affect them" and would also "rectify a distortion in the existing system".

In early October 2023, 71 constitutional and public law teachers and professors published an open letter to the Australian public, stating that:

Certainly it is impossible to predict exactly what the High Court might say in the future; this is the case for all constitutional and legal provisions. But we know that the vast majority of expert legal opinion agrees that this amendment is not constitutionally risky.

Former Chief Justice of Australia, Robert French, criticised the No campaign's legal arguments and other campaign tactics in a speech at the National Press Club, refuting the argument that it would have an effect on executive decision-making. He also said that the Voice would be unable to "[engage] effectively in terms of representation with the processes of government unless you have the executive government in there", and that this was not a mistake.

== Campaign ==
Campaigning for both sides of the question started in early 2023. Some of the groups and individuals involved are listed below.

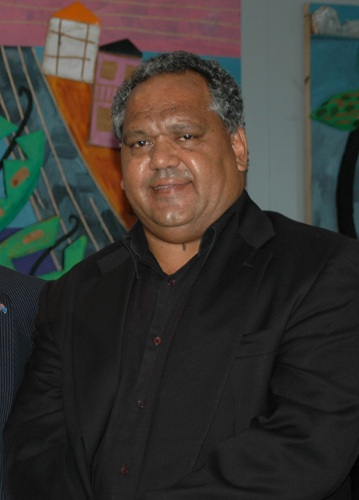
Noel Pearson; a key figure for the Yes campaign

=== Yes ===
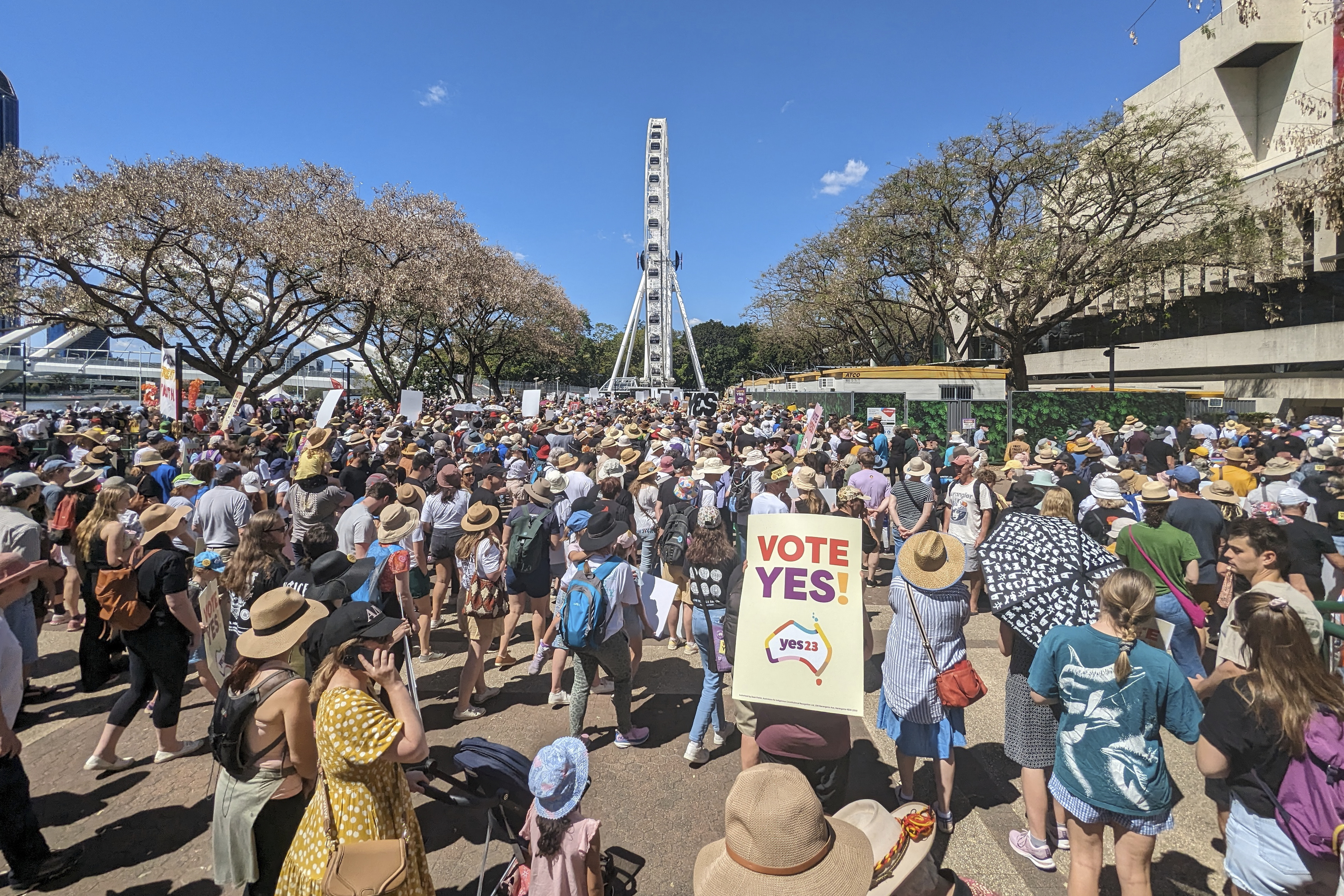
The Yes campaign held demonstrations around the country. Some 20,000 people attended the Brisbane rally.

- Uphold and Recognise (2015) was founded by lawyer Damien Freeman and Coalition spokesperson on Indigenous Australians, Julian Leeser (who is no longer with the group). It is chaired by Sean Gordon, who is co-convenor of the Liberals for Yes group, and has been a member of the First Nations Referendum Working Group, and includes former Indigenous Australians minister Ken Wyatt as a board member. It follows a centre-right approach.
- The Uluru Dialogue (2017) represents the cultural authority of the Uluru Statement from the Heart. It is based at the Indigenous Law Centre, University of New South Wales; it is co-chaired by Megan Davis and Pat Anderson.
- From the Heart (2020) operated under the auspices of Noel Pearson's Cape York Institute in north Queensland.
- Australians for Indigenous Constitutional Recognition is a group of prominent Australians co-chaired by the director of the Business Council of Australia, Danny Gilbert, and Aboriginal filmmaker Rachel Perkins. Board members include Noel Pearson; Tony Nutt, former principal adviser to prime minister John Howard; and author and Indigenous Maritime Union of Australia official Thomas Mayo. This group ran the Yes23 campaign.
- Parliamentary friends of the Uluru Statement (launched on 13 February 2023) is a non-partisan group co-chaired by Labor's Gordon Reid; Liberal Bridget Archer; and Independent Allegra Spender.

According to Mayo, all of these campaign groups were working towards the same goal.

- The National Aboriginal and Torres Strait Islander Catholic Council, based on a framework and foundation of subsidiarity.
- Jack Beetson, co-founder and executive director of Aboriginal education initiative Literacy for Life sat on the referendum working group.

=== No ===
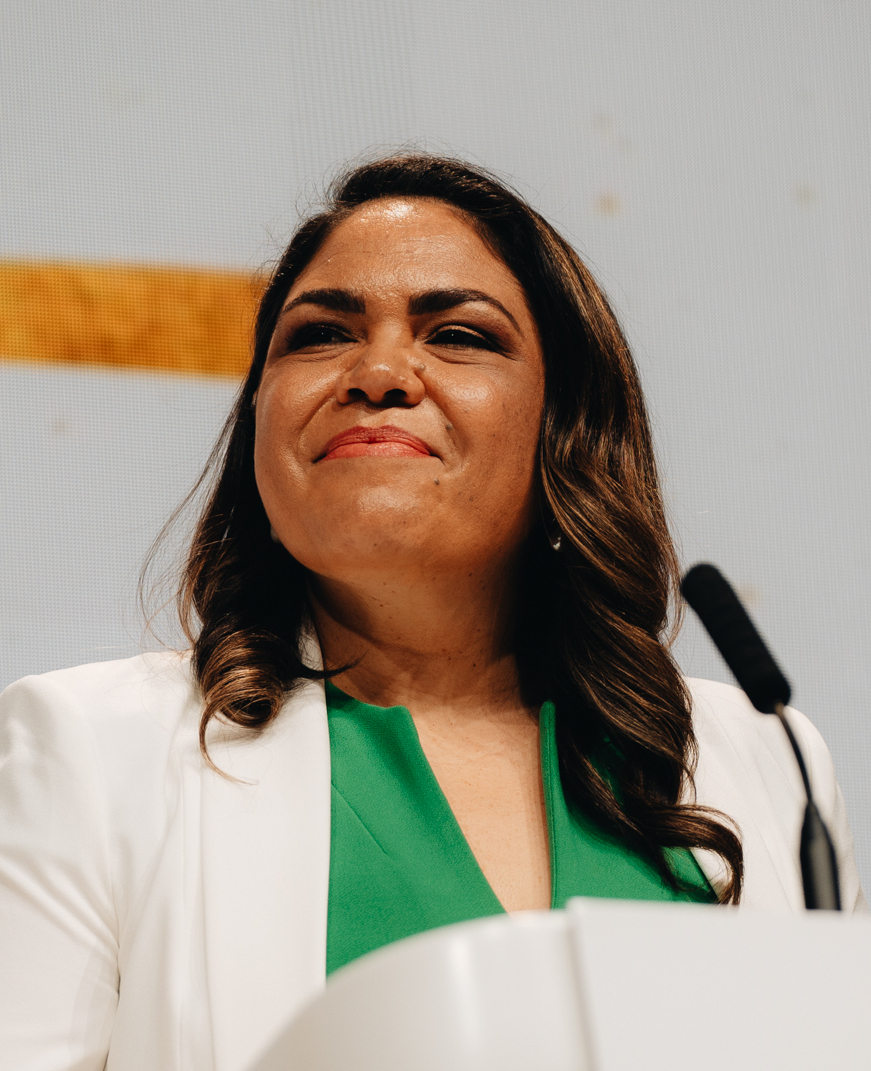
Jacinta Nampijinpa Price: a key figure for the No campaign

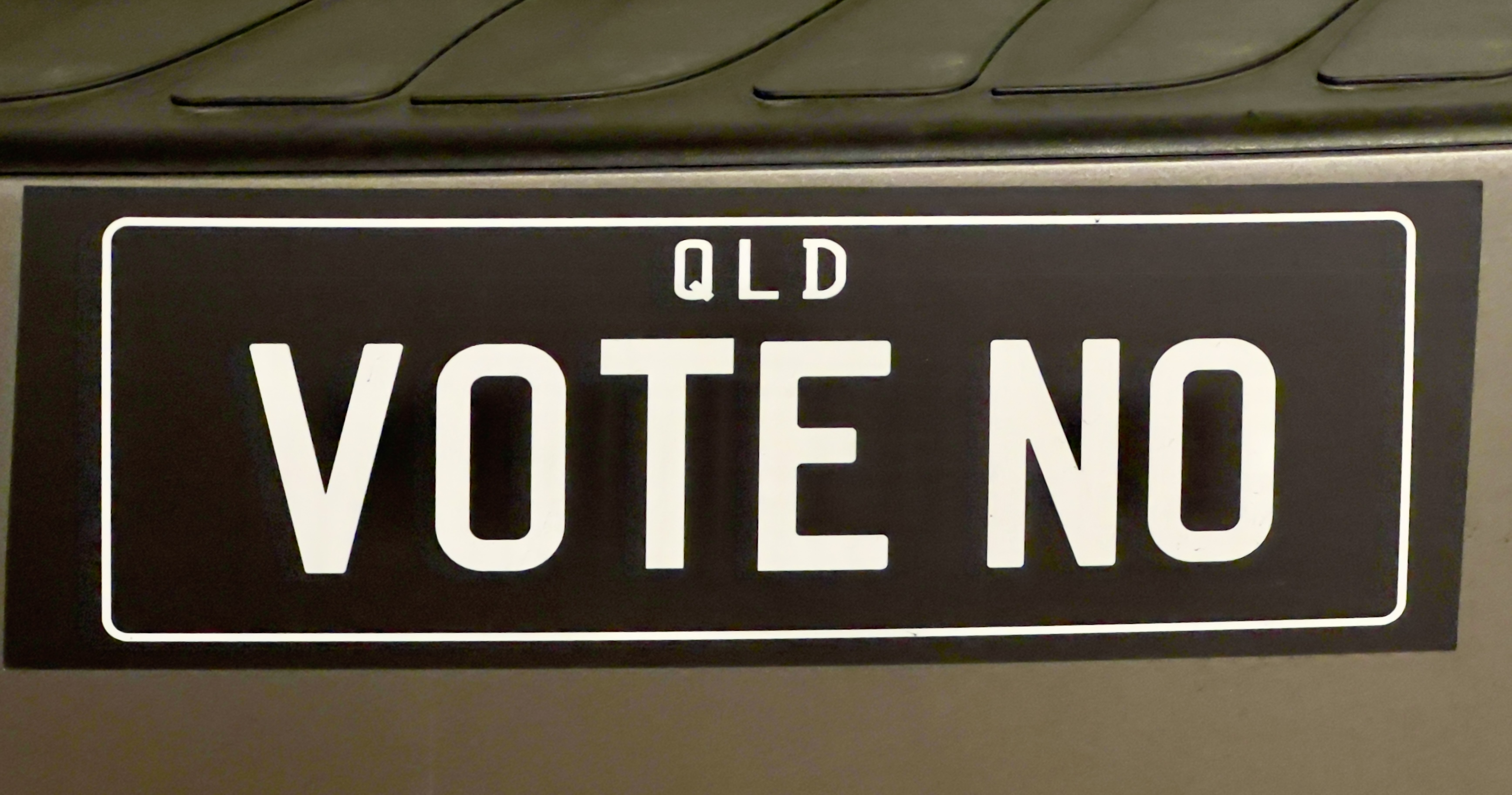
A No campaign car sticker in Queensland. As widely predicted, Queensland had the highest No vote percentage in the country.

- Advance (formerly Advance Australia), a conservative lobby group, set up a No campaign which included new social media advertising campaign titled "The Voice is Not Enough" (or just "Not Enough"), aimed at a young demographic and targeting the "progressive no" vote, suggesting that the Voice would be too weak, or is not the main priority for Aboriginal and Torres Strait Islander people. A number of people have accused Advance of misrepresenting their views and using photographs of them in its campaign without their permission. Advance has been funded by millionaires such as Jet Couriers founder Brett Ralph, Kennards Self Storage head Sam Kennard, building material scion Rodney O'Neil, health company chief Marcus Blackmore and fund manager Simon Fenwick. In addition, the group has created a "Referendum News" Facebook page showing anti-Voice posts, and has advertised on Facebook and Instagram. According to University of Technology Sydney political scientist Jeremy Walker, Advance also collaborated with fossil fuel companies and Atlas Network affiliates including the Centre for Independent Studies, Institute of Public Affairs, and LibertyWorks (founded by entrepreneur Andrew Cooper) to promote the No campaign.
- Australians for Unity, created on 11 May 2023, led by Warren Mundine and Jacinta Nampijinpa Price – both Indigenous Australians. This is a merger of two key former campaigns:
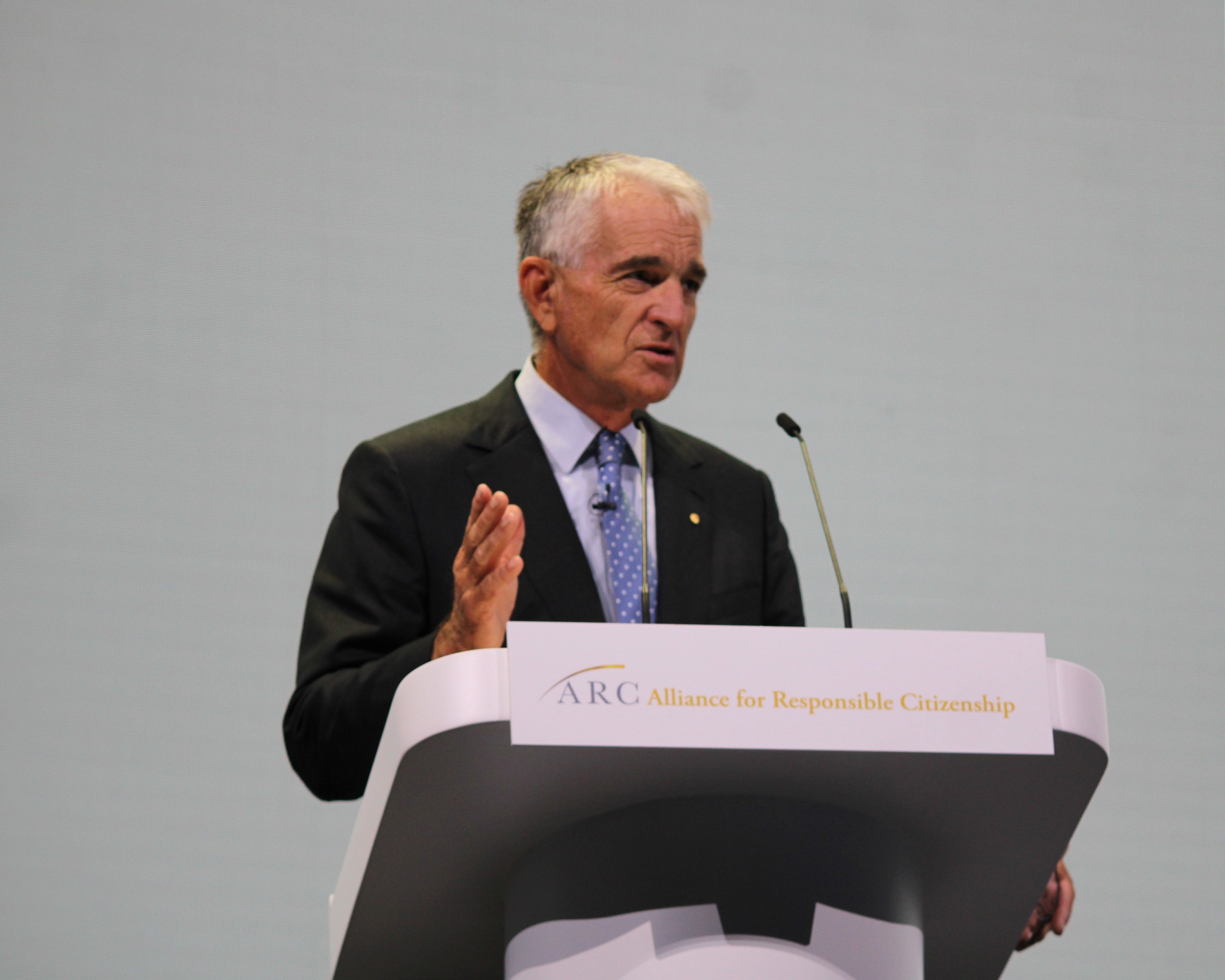
  - John Anderson, a key figure for the No campaign
    Recognise a Better Way was led by Mundine and included former Nationals deputy PM John Anderson, and former Keating government minister Gary Johns. The campaign, launched in January 2023, was set up by a group called the Voice No Case Committee. The committee included four Indigenous members: Mundine; Price (who left the group in February 2023 to join Advance); founder of the Kings Creek Station Ian Conway; and owner of Kemara enterprises Bob Liddle. Price officially deleted her membership of the Voice No Case Committee from the Senate register of pecuniary interests on 13 August 2023 (although she had never disclosed her interest before).
  - Fair Australia was a No campaign led by Jacinta Nampijinpa Price (who was originally part of the Recognise a Better Way group) under the auspices of Advance. (Note: Advance emerged during the 2019 election, attacking activist group GetUp!, supporting Tony Abbott against the independent Zali Steggall (who won the seat), and campaigning against David Pocock.)
- Blak Sovereign Movement, including Senator Lidia Thorpe, who spoke at the National Press Club on 16 August.

=== Advertising and media ===
The government launched its official advertising campaign about the referendum in May 2022, to provide information about what the proposal is, what the Voice would do and how it would be set up, and to encourage Australians to prepare themselves for it. The AEC (which is an independent statutory authority) launched its major education phase in August 2023, aimed at helping and educating voters to prepare for the referendum.

An analysis of various contributors to the campaigns published in early August suggested that the No campaign represented by Advance Australia were using fear as their underlying message, and focussing on prominent Yes campaigners such as Thomas Mayo and Teela Reid. The Blak Sovereign Movement argued that a treaty should be negotiated ahead of establishing the Voice. The Uluru Dialogue was using a sense of pride to show how the nation would be a better place with the Voice in place. Yes23 emphasised fairness and integrity. The report analysed the relative levels of success of the different approaches.

The Yes and No campaigns started advertising on social media in early 2023, and although both had spent around A$110,000 on advertising on Facebook between mid-March and mid-June 2023, it was found that each had targeted different audiences. The biggest spenders were Fair Australia and Yes23. From 3 September 2023, with John Farnham's support, "You're the Voice" was used to advocate for the Yes campaign as a soundtrack to a video ad. The video for the Yes campaign, which aired on several platforms, includes the 1983 America's Cup yacht race (won by an Australian yacht); the handback of Uluru to its traditional owners in 1985; and the landmark Mabo land rights case in 1992.

At the end of August, the top five items on Facebook and X included several that were critical of the Voice and served the No campaign. Their analysis showed how negative stories can have the strongest impact on people's attention, and also how far articles on traditional media could reach on social media. At that time, the Yes23 campaign had spent more than any other campaign group; however, they were less geographically focused than spending by No campaigns. It concluded that while there were many more Yes than No ads published, its message was spread over 33 disparate themes, whole No ads predominantly covered only seven, which were all negative. By the end of September, online advertising by both camps was heavily focused on the Tasmania and South Australia, which were regarded as "battleground" states. Fair Australia started using TikTok in May, and was using it far more extensively and proving more successful than the Yes campaign by October. Yes campaigners on other social media such as Facebook, X, and Instagram had large followings. This may reflect the fact that the younger demographic on TikTok were more likely to be Yes voters, and the No campaign wanted to reach them.

There has been considerable activity in news and other traditional media from both sides of the debate, including TV news (used by around 58% of Australians in 2023), news published online (51%), and in print (19%).

Mass media in Australia are highly concentrated, with Rupert Murdoch's News Corp Australia dominating the landscape, owning over two-thirds of leading newspapers along with most online news websites; three News Corp outlets occupy the top three positions in the nation, based on popularity and viewership. An interim report commissioned by the Australians for a Murdoch Royal Commission group as part of its "Murdoch Referendum Accountability Project" was published in September 2023. University of Adelaide academic Victoria Fielding and a team of researchers analysed data on reporting and commentary by News Corp about the Voice between July and August 2023, covering The Australian, Herald Sun, Daily Telegraph, and Sky News Australia. It found that on the whole, news reporting was unbiased and accurate, but the opinion pieces were almost all in favour of the No vote. The majority of News Corp's content was commentary, not reporting, so when the various articles and videos were examined together, around 70% of the coverage favoured No arguments. Andrew Bolt and Peta Credlin were the top contributors in favour of a No vote.

==== Incidents ====
In July 2023, a cartoon ad promoting the No campaign in the lead-up to the referendum was published by Advance Australia in the Australian Financial Review, featuring caricatures of Thomas Mayo a signatory and advocate of the Indigenous Voice to Parliament, along with, MP and Yes advocate Kate Chaney, and her father businessman Michael Chaney. This led to bipartisan condemnation of the ad as "racist". The AFR later apologised for the ad.

In July 2023, Big W, an Australian chain of discount department stores, announced it would stop its in-store announcements that expressed support for the Indigenous voice to parliament.

In early October, the AEC asked the Yes campaign to remove a social media post that contained a misleading graphic that could cause No voters to cast an invalid vote.

In early October, the AEC asked the Yes campaign to move their signage away from theirs to avoid confusion, because both were of a similar purple colour.

=== Misinformation and disinformation ===
Some opponents of the Voice, primarily right-wing and far-right politicians and commentators, internet trolls, and members of the sovereign citizen movement, have spread online misinformation, disinformation and unfounded conspiracy theories regarding the referendum. This activity is most prominent on Telegram, Twitter and WeChat. According to independent monitors and fact-checkers, online debate has focused on race, particularly on Twitter. Ben James, editor of the Australian Associated Press FactCheck team, which monitors content on Facebook, Instagram and TikTok, says that the amount of misinformation and disinformation had by early September exceeded that which had been observed on social media ahead of the 2022 Australian election. Leading Indigenous campaigner Thomas Mayo has been subjected to a great deal of racial abuse. While some misinformation has been observed from people on both sides of the discussion, there was generally more on the No side – although it is noted that not all of the claims emanated from the official No campaign. Social media experts have observed "bot-like behaviour" that spread the same content across social media.

A preprint study in September 2023 showed Yes tweets dominating the Twitter platform, including amplification of misinformation and conspiracy theories created by the No side, with the Yes voters trying to fact-check and correct them. Politicians and media were also increasing the themes of "racial division" and "hidden agenda" on Twitter, in particular Sky News Australia. Many of the No accounts appeared to be recently created and suspicious, although there was little evidence of social bots. The preprint concluded "Overall, our findings reveal a media ecosystem fraught with confusion, conspiratorial sensemaking, and strategic media manipulation".

It was reported that much of the misleading information and disinformation has been promoted by internet trolls linked to the Chinese Communist Party, with China being accused of espionage, attempting to undermine Western influence and attempting to silence Western criticism of human rights abuses in China. An analysis by Recorded Future confirmed the findings of Australian Strategic Policy Institute in this regard but found no evidence that Iran or Russia were trying to influence the debate. Chinese social media platforms such as WeChat also prominently spread misinformation and occasionally even racism.

Australian Electoral Commissioner Tom Rogers said that social media had not adequately dealt with misinformation and disinformation on their platforms; of 47 reported by the AEC as being of concern, only 16 had been taken down.

RMIT FactLab, which had been checking some of the claims made by the No campaign, including that the Uluru Statement comprised more than one page, was suspended by Meta as its key fact-checking organisation in August 2023 because its certification from the International Fact-Checking Network had expired in December 2022. However, it continues its work and is regularly published by ABC News. Until 2025 when RMIT FactLab (later rebranded as RMIT Lookout) was permanently shut down quietly in February 2025.

=== Quality of public debate ===
Concerns were aired about the quality of public debate, by both campaigns and private individuals on both sides of the debate, in some cases describing it as divisive and "toxic". Political commentator Laura Tingle described the debate as "bitter", criticising the No campaign in particular.

Marcia Langton was accused of calling No voters "racists", after The Australian published an article headlined "Langton brands No voters 'racist, stupid'"; she claimed she was referring to the tactics of No campaigners, not the voters, which she said were "based in racism and stupidity".

There has been racism directed against Aboriginal and Torres Strait Islander people, including criticism of unrelated topics such as Welcomes to Country, claims that Indigenous people have special treatment, and promulgation of racist stereotypes. "Progressive No" campaigner Lidia Thorpe, who herself has been subject to racist abuse and death threats, exposed a video of a hooded man making racist remarks, burning an Aboriginal flag, and giving a Nazi salute. Abuse towards campaigners on both sides reportedly affected the mental health of several people.

== Opinion polling ==
Opinion polling on whether to change the Australian Constitution to establish an Indigenous Voice has been conducted since 2017, when Aboriginal and Torres Strait Islander leaders petitioned for such an amendment as part of the Uluru Statement from the Heart. The number of these polls conducted grew substantially following Labor's victory in the 2022 federal election; the party had committed to holding the referendum required for this constitutional change in its first term of government.

At least ten firms polled Australians on the proposed amendment, greater than the number who have polled party support for any previous Australian election. Some firms were commissioned by media organisations, think tanks, advocacy groups or university foundations. Other firms self-initiated their polls for market research or strategic communications purposes. Considering methodologies, polls were almost exclusively conducted online, with only one firm using SMS. Pollsters differed on whether to give a forced-choice question, as is done in actual Australian referendums, or allow respondents to express indecision or lack of knowledge. Some pollsters also used Likert-style questions to allow respondents to express how strong their opinion is.

The Australian Constitution requires a proposed amendment to attain a double majority in the referendum – not only a majority of votes nationwide, but also a majority in at least four of the six states. Because of this requirement, the level of support in each state was of special interest. One way pollsters investigated state-level support was to break down results from national polls. However, these polls sometimes did not survey enough people from each state to give reliable results about state-level support, especially for smaller states like Tasmania and South Australia. Another way pollsters investigated was by specifically surveying people from a particular state.

Pollsters also often broke down their results by age, gender, and party affiliation. The last was of particular interest because bipartisan support is often considered necessary for an Australian referendum to pass, though it is not a formal requirement.

The extent of support for the Voice among Aboriginal and Torres Strait Islander Australians was a key point of discussion. All publicly available polling indicated absolute majorities among this group favouring the Voice. Important caveats include the small sample size associated with certain polls, the length of time elapsed since the polls were conducted, and the lack of publicly available results and methodologies for certain polls.

== Early voting ==
On 4 October, the AEC reported that 903,570 votes had been cast after three days of early voting.

By polling day, 6 million early votes had been cast at pre-poll centres, and 2 million postal votes were expected.

== Result ==
The Constitutional amendment was rejected in both the state and national vote counts, with the Australian Capital Territory being the only state or territory with a majority "yes" vote.

Despite some predictions of a low turnout, the participation rate for the referendum was 89.92%, just higher than the rate for the 2022 election of 89.82%. Similarly, despite concerns about ticks and crosses, (Note: A tick was counted as "yes", but a cross was deemed ambiguous and so treated as informal and not counted at all.) the informal voting rate was 0.98%, comparable to the rate for the republic referendum of 0.86% and lower than the typical rate for federal elections of around 2%.

Regions with a high proportion of Indigenous Australians overwhelmingly voted yes in the referendum. Labor MP for Lingiari, Marion Scrymgour suggested that 74% of the 11,000 people that live in the division's remote areas voted yes. The highest vote in support of yes in an Indigenous community was in Wadeye, at 92.1%. The Tiwi Islands voted 84% in favour, and Maningrida recorded an 88% yes vote. However, many of these remote communities also had a very low turnout, with Palm Island, which recorded a yes vote of around 75%, having a preliminary participation rate of around 1 in 3. Warren Mundine suggested that the low turn-out in remote communities indicated "that, at best, most Aboriginal people of voting age in remote communities didn't vote at all, and the percentage who voted Yes was less than 30 per cent". Election analyst Antony Green argued that drawing conclusions based on a relation between the vote of an electorate and its recorded Indigenous population was an example of the ecological fallacy as the data could not be used to predict the vote of individual voters.

=== National ===
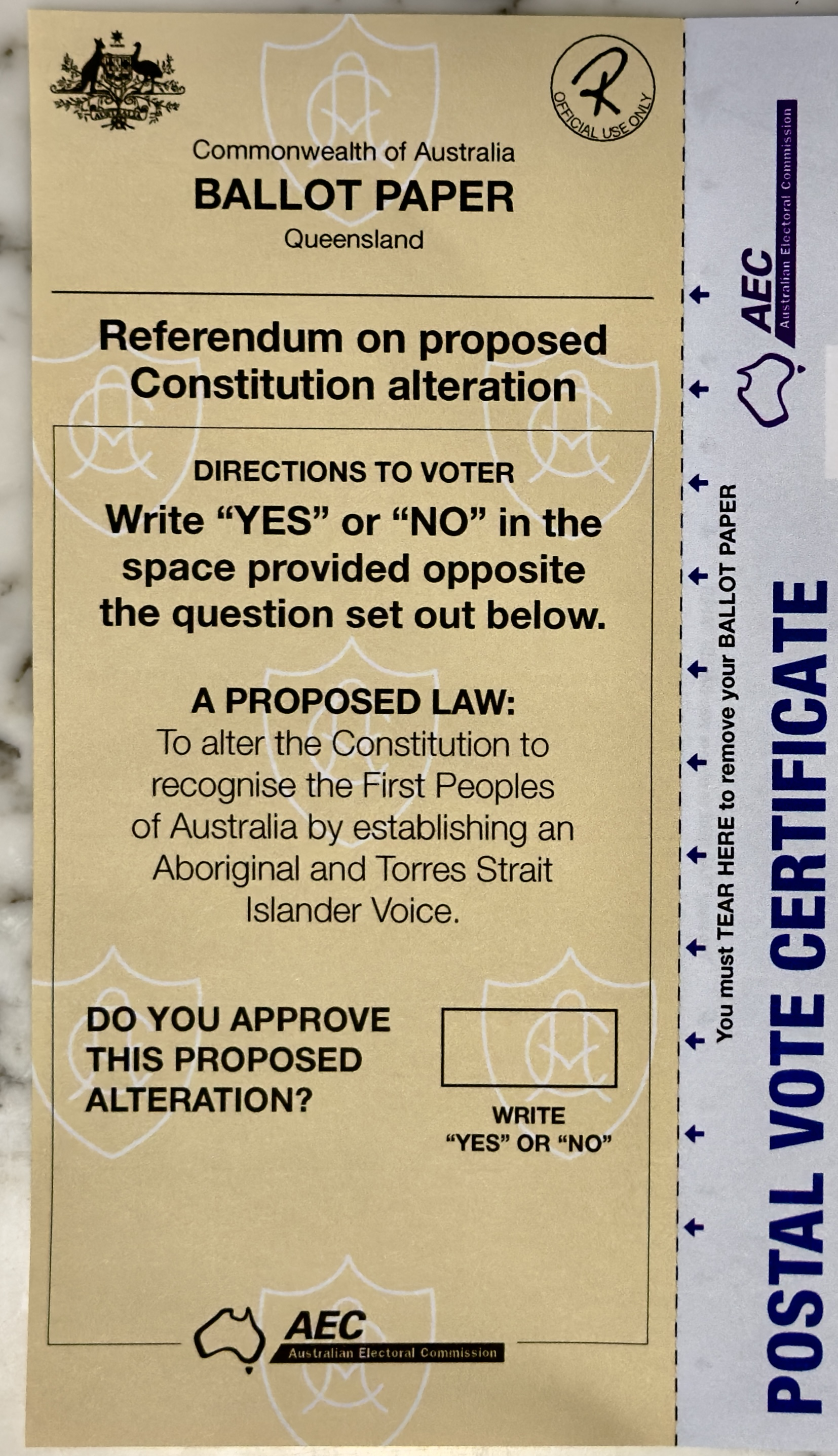
Postal ballot paper

Australian Indigenous Voice referendum
Choice	Votes	%
For	6,286,894	39.94
Against	9,452,792	60.06
Total	15,739,686	100.00
Valid votes	15,739,686	99.02
Invalid/blank votes	155,545	0.98
Total votes	15,895,231	100.00
Registered voters/turnout	17,671,784	89.95
Source: Australian Electoral Commission

=== States and territories ===
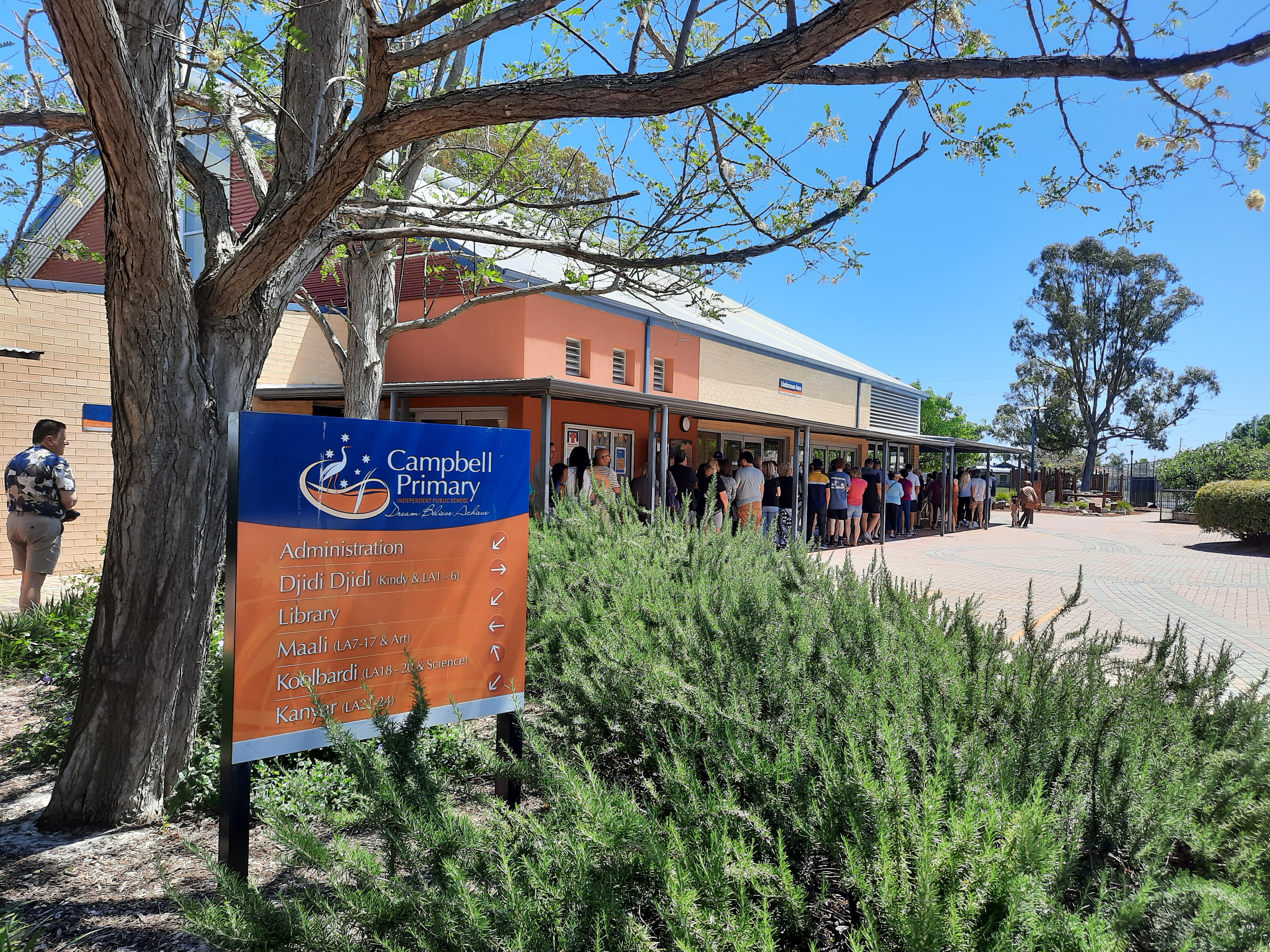
Queue of people waiting to cast their vote at a polling booth on 14 October 2023

Votes cast in the territories are included in the national total for the purposes of determining a national majority, but the territories are not counted for the purposes of determining a majority of states.

Breakdown of voting by state and territory
State/territory	Yes		No		Informal votes	Turnout (%)
State/territory	Votes	%	Votes	%	Informal votes	Turnout (%)
New South Wales	2,058,764	41.04	2,957,880	58.96	57,285	90.80
Victoria	1,846,623	45.85	2,180,851	54.15	39,038	91.00
Queensland	1,010,416	31.79	2,167,957	68.21	27,266	88.25
Western Australia	582,077	36.73	1,002,740	63.27	13,454	87.50
South Australia	417,745	35.83	748,318	64.17	11,478	91.75
Tasmania	152,171	41.06	218,425	58.94	3,967	92.03
Northern Territory (Note: In accordance with the Referendum (Machinery Provisions) Act 1984, residents of the territory of Cocos (Keeling) Islands and the territory of Christmas Island are included in the Northern Territory for electoral purposes.)	43,076	39.70	65,429	60.30	820	71.45
Australian Capital Territory (Note: In accordance with the Referendum (Machinery Provisions) Act 1984, residents of the territories of Jervis Bay Territory and Norfolk Island are included in the Australian Capital Territory for electoral purposes.)	176,022	61.29	111,192	38.71	2,237	91.36
Total	6,286,894	39.94	9,452,792	60.06	155,545	89.92
Results	Obtained a majority in no state and an overall minority of 3,165,898 votes. Not carried.					

== Analysis ==
Analysis of the referendum results and of survey data collected before and immediately after the referendum was conducted by the Australian National University to attempt to gauge the intention and reasoning of voters. The report concluded that:

The data suggests that Australians voted no because they didn’t want division and remain sceptical of rights for some Australians that are not held by others. The data suggests that Australians think that Aboriginal and Torres Strait Islander Australians continue to suffer levels of disadvantage that is both caused by past government policies and that justified extra government assistance. They did not see the Voice model put to them as the right approach to remedy that disadvantage.

The results also demonstrated some evidence of an urban–rural political divide. The four electorates returning more than 70% of votes in favour of Yes were the namesake electorates centred on the central business districts of Melbourne, Sydney and Canberra, as well as Prime Minister Albanese's inner Sydney electorate of Grayndler. By contrast, the only five electorates to return less than 20% of votes in favour of Yes — Maranoa, Flynn, Capricornia, Hinkler and Dawson — were all rural electorates in southern and central Queensland.

Analysis by DemosAU concluded that fear of constitutional change in general was the primary reason for the referendum's failure, with 29% of the electorate opposed to any change and 23% believing it should only be changed "if it doesn't work". They concluded that the referendum would have failed regardless of the proposal without bi-partisan support.

== Aftermath ==
Once the referendum result became clear on the night of 14 October, Yes23 campaign co-chair Rachel Perkins called for a week of silence "to grieve this outcome and reflect on its meaning and significance". After this period, an unsigned open letter was distributed by the public relations firm that had worked for the Uluru Dialogue (a key yes group based at the Indigenous Law Centre of UNSW Sydney) that decried the result as "unbelievable and appalling" and concluded that constitutional recognition would no longer be possible. It also highlighted the role the Liberal and National parties had in the defeat, stating "there was little the yes campaign could do to countervail" the impact of their opposition. Warren Mundine responded to the letter, saying it was a "disgraceful attack on Australia and Australian people".

The result was perceived by many as a significant setback to reconciliation in Australia. Aboriginal academic and pro-Voice campaigner Marcia Langton declared that Australian voters' rejection of the Voice made it "very clear that Reconciliation is dead".

After the referendum, in which over 64% of South Australians voted against the Voice, state Liberal leader David Speirs cast some doubt on the state based voice. South Australian One Nation MP Sarah Game announced plans to introduce a bill to repeal the First Nations Voice Act 2023.

On 19 October 2023, the Queensland opposition Liberal National Party of Queensland (LNP) leader David Crisafulli announced that they would be dropping their support for a state based treaty and truth-telling. The LNP had previously supported a treaty in early 2023. The Path to Treaty Act 2023 was repealed and the state's Truth-Telling and Healing Inquiry was abolished following the LNP gaining government in 2024.

The Victorian Liberal Party were divided in the aftermath of the referendum over whether to continue supporting the state's treaty process. Alongside their fellow Coalition partners, the National Party of Victoria, in January 2024 both parties withdrew their support for a treaty, leaving Victoria without bi‑partisan backing for the proposal.

Former Prime Minister Tony Abbott said the result was a rejection of identity politics and a chance to reject or reduce Aboriginal "separatism" with the wider Australian community, such as by no longer flying Aboriginal flags equally with the national flag or by not giving an acknowledgment of country prior to speaking at an official event.

Speaking one year after the referendum, Megan Davis and Yes23 campaign director Dean Parkin argued that the referendum debate had been unduly captured by politicians, with Indigenous voices shut out. Davis also stated that the Albanese government and the Commonwealth has subsequently endorsed leaving Indigenous policy to the states and territories who "aren't committed". Key figures in the No voice campaign Jacinta Nampijinpa Price and Nyunggai Warren Mundine stated that Australians want the best for "the vulnerable and needy in our country (but) the voice failed to realise this" and "they didn’t want racial separation and race-based rights in the constitution and that they want all Australians to be treated equally".

== See also ==
- List of Indigenous Australian politicians
- List of Indigenous Australians in politics and public service
- Referendums in Australia
