= Literacy for Life Foundation =

Australian adult literacy organisation

- Type: Non-profit organisation
- Founded: May 2013
- Focus: Improving literacy levels within the adult Aboriginal community in Australia
- Key People: Jack Beetson, Executive Director
- Website: lflf.org.au

Literacy for Life Foundation is an Aboriginal Australian not-for-profit organisation focused on improving the literacy levels among Aboriginal Australians. It was formed in 2013 by three prominent Aboriginal leaders, Pat Anderson, Donna Ah Chee, and Jack Beetson, in partnership with leading international construction company Multiplex, to drive the National Aboriginal Adult Literacy Campaign across Australia.

== Background ==
The prevalence of low to very low adult English literacy levels in First Nations communities in Australia continues to be a challenge, despite a decade of government-supported Foundation Skills training provided through the national vocational education and training system.

Regardless of whether they live in urban, rural or remote areas, up to 65% of Aboriginal people have low English literacy. A 2013 study suggested that around 40% of Aboriginal adults were at or below Level One on the Australian Core Skills Framework (ACSF). The minimum level necessary to succeed in most training, study and employment opportunities is Level Two or Three.

The State of the World's Indigenous Peoples report (UN, 2009) noted that, in 2006 Indigenous Australians had higher unemployment rates, a median income just over half of non-Indigenous Australians, be less likely to own their own home and more likely to experience overcrowding, with conditions worsening to food and water insecurity in remote and rural communities. These conditions are closely tied to low English literacy rates which limit opportunities in formal employment and access to vital services, with the Joyce Review into Australia's vocational education and training system identifying low levels of English literacy as a major challenge for the vocational education sector.

== Campaign model ==
The "campaign model" used by the Literacy for Life Foundation originated in Cuba as the "Yes, I Can" ("Yo, sí puedo") model and was applied in Australia to meet the needs of Indigenous communities following a three-year pilot stage managed by the University of New England in partnership with IPLAC and the Lowitja Foundation, funded by the Australian and NSW governments. By 2010, the "Yes I Can / Yo, sí puedo" model had been used with more than 6 million people in 28 countries to learn to read and write. In Timor-Leste, more than 200,000 people graduated within five years.

The Literacy for Life Campaign aim is to raise the level of English literacy among adults in the communities with which it works, within a specified period of time. Each literacy campaign uses a three phase 'whole-of-community' model The foundation works with local Aboriginal organisations, government agencies, councils, church groups and elders to contribute and build towards the common goal of enhancing literacy levels for all adults in the community. Local community members are trained as campaign coordinators and facilitators supported by professional adult educators. Because Literacy for Life campaigns are run with a high degree of local Indigenous autonomy and national Indigenous leadership, the acquisition of literacy is contextually relevant to and embedded in the life experiences of the Indigenous facilitators and students. In 2016, the retention rate of 67% was over five times the retention for VET system courses at a similar level.

=== Campaigns ===
The University of New England piloted the campaign model in Bourke, Enngonia and Wilcannia in remote New South Wales with multiple intakes of students beginning 2012 until June 2014. Almost 80 people graduated across these three communities. The Literacy for Life Foundation planned to launch the campaign in Brewarrina in the second half of 2014.

Since the first literacy campaign in Wilcannia in 2012, 258 First Nations adults have graduated, and a 2022 study assessing 63 participants over six of the Literacy for Life campaign sites showed a 73% improvement in literacy based on the Australian Core Skills Framework (ACSF).

As of 2023, Campaigns now run in at least 14 locations across New South Wales, Queensland and the Northern Territory, including Yarrabah, Tennant Creek, Ltyntye Apurte, Enngonia, Bourke, Wilcannia, Brewarrina, Walgett, Collarenebri, Boggabilla, Toomelah and Coonamble.

Improvements in literacy associated with the campaign have had a positive impact on reducing offending rates.

== Recognition ==
=== NSW State Parliament ===
The success of the national literacy Campaign pilot was formally recognised by the Parliament of NSW on 14 May 2014 when a motion moved by Catherine Cusack MLC was passed unanimously.

=== Cynthis Briggs Empowerment through Education Award ===
The Literacy for Life Foundation was awarded the inaugural Cynthia Briggs Empowerment through Education Award as recognition of an educational collaboration that ensure a more sustainable and self-determining future.

== Governance ==
The Literacy for Life Foundation is governed by five board members, as of 2023:

- Dr Wendy Ludwig (Hon D Ed) (WINU)

Dr Ludwig is a Kungarakan and Gurindji woman from Darwin. Her lifelong work as an educator and knowledge holder formed part of the recommendation from the National Aboriginal and Torres Strait Islander Higher Education Consortium (NATSIHEC).

- Professor Jack Beetson - Executive Director and National Campaign Coordinator

Professor Jack Beetson is a Ngemba man from Brewarrina, Western NSW and a prominent figure in Aboriginal adult literacy. He has been actively involved in Indigenous education in Australia and internationally for over 30 years and is the executive director of the Literacy for Life Foundation.

- Patricia Anderson - Director (Chairperson - The Lowitja Institute)

Pat Anderson is an Alyawarre woman who has received an honorary doctorate and an Order of Australia for her leadership in promoting improved health and educational outcomes. This work includes her continuous service on the board of Literacy for Life Foundation since 2013 She is a prominent 'Yes' advocate of the 2023 Australian Indigenous Voice referendum.

- John Flecker - Director (CEO - Multiplex)

Flecker is a founding director of the Literacy for Life Foundation, a board member and former president of the Australian Constructors Association and is on the board of trustees of The Scotch College (WA) Foundation (Inc) and the school council.

- Don Aroney - Secretary & director (Executive Director Operations - Multiplex)

Aroney is executive director of Operations at Brookfield Multiplex, and the Company Secretary and board member of the Literacy for Life Foundation.

== Notable partnerships ==
The Literacy for Life Foundation have several founding partners:

- The Lowitja Institute – Australia's National Institute for Aboriginal and Torres Strait Islander Health Research
- Multiplex
- University of New England (Evaluation partner)
- Microsoft (pro-bono innovation partner)

In 2014, the Literacy for Life Foundation partnered with the Penrith Panthers rugby league team. The Literacy for Life Foundation logo appeared in the lower back position on the 2014 jersey and Penrith Panthers Executive General Manager Phil Gould attended the March 2014 graduation ceremony in Bourke.
