= Yes, I Can =

Literacy teaching method

Yes, I Can (Spanish: Yo, sí puedo) is a teaching method for adult literacy which was developed by Cuban educator Leonela Relys Diaz and first trialled in Haiti and Nicaragua in 2000. To date, this method has been used in 29 nations allowing over 6 million people to develop basic literacy. The program was originally developed in Spanish and known as Yo, sí puedo. It has now been translated into many languages including Portuguese, English, Quechua, Aymara, Creole and Swahili. The Yes I Can literacy method uses pre-recorded lessons on video or DVD that are delivered by a local facilitator. Yes I Can also uses an alphanumeric association between numbers and letters.

The program consists of the following teaching materials: the student booklet, a facilitator manual and 17 videos or DVDs which present recordings of 65 classes with actors taking the parts of teachers and students. These materials are implemented by a team of local facilitators who are trained and supported by technical advisers. The process consists of three stages: a preliminary period of socialization and training, the actual lesson blocks in which literacy is taught and a third stage known as post-literacy. The program is also available in braille for the blind, and for deaf people, and for people with mild intellectual problems. Other programs are linked to Yes I Can, including Yo, sí puedo seguir or Yes I Can Continue, which aims to consolidate and develop the basic literacy skills participants learn in the Yes I Can program.

== History ==
Yes I Can emerges from a strong tradition of literacy education that has existed in Cuba since the 1961 Cuban Literacy Campaign. The 1961 Campaign reduced the illiteracy rate in Cuba from 23.6% to 3.9%. Since that time Cuban educators worked in many countries to help develop adult literacy prior to the development of Yes I Can, notably in Angola and Nicaragua.

It was on the basis of such examples of Cuban educational aid that in 1995 the African country of Niger requested Cuban assistance to combat illiteracy. Due to a very high illiteracy rate (over 50%) and the difficulties of addressing this entirely through face to face teaching Cuba proposed a program delivered by radio. However the President of Niger, Ibrahim Baré Maïnassara, was killed in a coup d'état before the new approach could be implemented in Niger, and it was instead trialled in Haiti and Nicaragua. Following this Dr. Leonela Relys Diaz and other educators at the Latin American and Caribbean Pedagogical Institute (IPLAC) developed a similar program utilising television.

== The lessons ==
Yes I Can classes are delivered using a combination of distance education and community participation. The classes are convened by a local facilitator. The classes are organized around a discussion topic, which introduces a key letter or word for the lesson. The facilitator uses a series of pre-recorded classes usually on DVD and the accompanying workbook as the basis of the literacy class. The DVD depicts a small literacy class in which the teacher explains the lesson and exercises in the workbook and the students ask questions and make comments. The facilitator can stop and start the DVD-class, to allow their students to complete the exercises, discuss particular points, or repeat sections if required. In some cases economic and technical problems prevent the use of the DVD lessons which can cause inconsistencies in how the program is implemented.

There is an introductory block of lessons designed for people with no prior experience of reading and writing which include exercises to practise holding a pen and forming simple shapes. In cases where participants already have some literacy experience these lessons can be skipped. In later classes students work with more complex blocks of text and learn other skills such as how to fill out forms with basic personal data. Students are considered to have successfully completed the program when they have produced a simple letter to a friend including description and opinion.

The local facilitator works as the link between the virtual class of students in the audiovisual recording and the real participants. A 2006 UNESCO review of Yes I Can notes, "The role of facilitators has received both recognition and criticism". The report notes their strong social commitment, but notes problems in terms of the consistency of teaching skills amongst relatively untrained people.

== Alphanumeric method ==
The alphanumeric approach uses knowledge of numbers to develop a knowledge of letters. This was introduced to the program on the suggestion of Dr Fidel Castro and based on the understanding that numbers are more familiar in everyday life to people who are illiterate. The vowels a, e, i, o, u are associated with the numbers 1-5 and the consonants are associated with numbers roughly in correspondence to their frequency of use. Many illiterate people in Cuba were able to deal effectively with money and quantities, an education that they got on the streets. Linking literacy with numbers and money is one of the reasons it has been so successful. This aspect of the program has, however, been criticised on the grounds that the introduction of letters combined with numbers overwhelms the non-literate person. This criticism failed to take account of the fact that many illiterate people are numerate with regards to money and tradeable quantities.

== Community wide approach ==
Within the Yes I Can method low literacy is not understood as an individual issue but rather as a social issue that requires a community wide approach. This process is referred to as socialization and involves mobilising as many people as possible to take part in the campaign in a variety of roles. This process aims to develop a community wide understanding of the links between literacy and wider social and economic development goals.

In relation to this aspect of the campaign UNESCO has noted that Yes I Can, "is in fact more than a method. It would be more appropriate to understand it as a literacy training model that goes beyond processes, materials, strategies etc., as it includes, both explicitly and implicitly, concepts of literacy training, learning, life skills and social mobilization, and involves a wide range of actors with varied roles from the beneficiaries of the literacy training to other stakeholders such as state entities and other concerned institutions".

== Developing and maintaining literate communities ==
Yes I Can allows students to develop their reading and writing skills at an intelligent but basic level. However the program does not claim to establish a level of literacy that is self-sustaining without additional attention. Consequently, a third phase of the campaign, known as the 'post-literacy' phase (Yo, sí puedo seguir) provides opportunities for graduates to undertake activities that consolidate and extend their new literacy. These may take the form of ongoing courses, employment or becoming a facilitator for a new intake of students.

== Achievements and prospects ==
In 2006 the UNESCO King Sejong Literacy Prize was awarded to IPLAC for its work in developing and promoting the Yes I Can program. In 2012, it also received the "Mestres 68" Prize. Cuba has offered this method to the international community and has suggested that with its implementation illiteracy could be eradicated globally within 10 years and at a cost of just $1.5 billion.

Yes I Can has been implemented in a number of linguistic and cultural contexts including the following:

=== East Timor ===
Yes I Can has been used in East Timor in a national campaign which began in 2006 with the arrival of 12 Cuban literacy advisors. By the end of 2007, literacy classes had commenced in over 400 local government areas of the country. Although initially delivered in Portuguese, new materials were later designed in Tetum, the most widely spoken of Timor's many languages. The program became known by its Tetum name, Los Hau Bele. The campaign mobilised over 200,000 people to participate in classes, and a workforce of over 600 local literacy facilitators and community organizers, who were trained by the Cuban advisors. The campaign ended in December 2012, by which time every one of East Timor's thirteen districts had been declared free of illiteracy.

=== Australia ===
In 2012 a formal licence agreement with Cuba enabled the first pilot project of Yes I Can to be initiated in Australia. The campaign was first implemented in Wilcannia, in far-western New South Wales and has since expanded to Bourke and Enngonia with plans for further expansion in 2015. The pilot was initiated by the National Aboriginal Adult Literacy Campaign Steering Committee and managed by the University of New England in partnership with Wilcannia Local Aboriginal Land Council. The Literacy for Life Foundation is a partnership between key agencies and individuals involved in the campaign.

=== Aotearoa New Zealand ===
Yes I Can methodology was used in Aotearoa, New Zealand in the Greenlight program implemented between 2003 and 2007 through the Māori-led tertiary institution Te Wānanga o Aotearoa. Cuban educators worked with their counterparts in Aotearoa New Zealand in a diagnostic stage which resulted in the development of a new program, Greenlight Learning for Life. Greenlight, consisted of 4 modules which were designed to take students from level 1 to level 3 on the NZ framework – essentially to university entrance standard. Traditional Maori pedagogy and identity were emphasised in the development of materials.

=== Other locations ===
A version of Yes I Can has been implemented since 2007 in Uruguay and enjoyed widespread success.

Since 2007, in Guatemala almost 20,000 people have learned to read and write using the program.

In Angola over 300 000 people have benefited from the campaign.

Yes I Can is also being implemented in the city of Seville which is the first experience with the Cuban method in Europe.

The Latino Alliance for Literacy Advancement de New Mexico plans to implement the Yes I Can campaign in 4 pilot sites in the US state of New Mexico in 2015.
