= Thomas Mayo (author) =

Australian author and human rights advocate

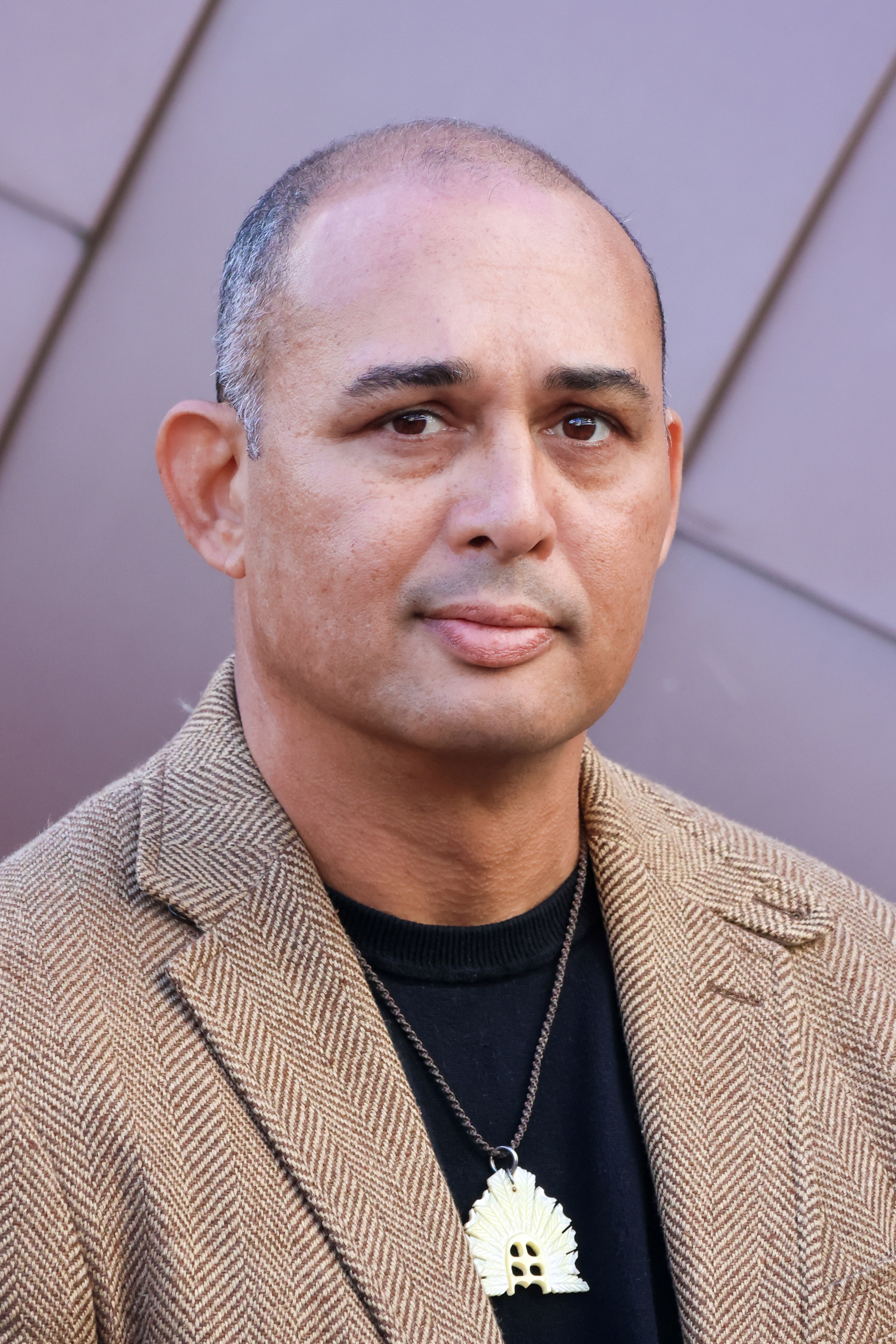
- Mayo in 2026
- Born: Thomas Mayor; 1977 (age 48–49); Darwin, Northern Territory, Australia
- Occupations: Human rights advocate, trade union official, author
- Employer: Maritime Union of Australia
- Known for: Indigenous Voice to Parliament campaigner
- Political party: Labor
- Website: thomasmayo.com.au

Thomas Mayo (né Mayor, born c. 1977) is an Australian human rights advocate, a trade union official and an award-winning author. As an Australian of Kaurareg Aboriginal and Kalkalgal and Erubamle Torres Strait Islander ancestry, Mayo is a signatory of the Uluru Statement from the Heart. In 2017, he became a prominent advocate for a Voice to Parliament for Aboriginal and Torres Strait Islander people.

== Early life ==
Thomas Mayo was born in 1977 on the land of the Larrakia people in Darwin, Northern Territory. His father, Celestino Mayor, is an Aboriginal and Torres Strait Islander man who also has Filipino and Dayak ancestry. His mother, Liz Mayor, was of Polish and English ancestry. His maternal grandfather was a Jewish refugee from Poland.

As an Islander growing up in mainland Australia, Mayo learnt to hunt traditional foods with his father and traditional island dance from the Darwin community of Torres Strait Islanders.

Thomas Mayo completed Year 12 at school.

== Career ==
Mayo started working as a "wharfie" at age 17 on the docks in Darwin,where he was a labourer and machine operator.

Aged 21, Mayo became a union delegate in the Maritime Union of Australia (MUA) after the Patricks dispute at the wharves in 1998. The dispute arose when the Patrick Corporation and the government attempted to de-unionise the industry by locking out the workforce. He became a delegate in 1999, a Union organiser in 2010, and the MUA's Northern Territory Branch Secretary in 2013. He was elected as Assistant National Secretary of the MUA in 2023.

In May 2017, Mayo was one of the elected members of the Uluru National Constitutional Convention, the culmination of 13 regional dialogues, which produced the Uluru Statement from the Heart. That same year, the MUA supported Mayo as he began a 6-year campaign to enshrine a First Nations Voice in the constitution, as was called for in the Uluru Statement from the Heart.

His first book was about the first part of this journey in 2019, titled “Finding the Heart of the Nation: The Journey of the Uluru Statement towards Voice, Treaty and Truth”. By late 2024, Mayo had published seven books and won several prestigious awards.

Mayo has been an Assistant National Secretary of the Maritime Union of Australia since his election to the position in 2023.

== Advocacy ==
In 2017, Thomas Mayo was a signatory to the Uluru Statement from the Heart, which was printed onto a large canvas and afterwards decorated by Anangu law women. He then travelled the country for 18 months with the rolled-up canvas in a tube, showing it to people and explaining what the Voice was about.

Thomas Mayo has been a board director at Australians for Indigenous Constitutional Recognition since 2019.

Mayo continued to advocate for a referendum to achieve a Voice to Parliament until the 2023 Australian Indigenous Voice referendum. His journey is documented in his book Finding the Heart of the Nation.

In 2022, Thomas Mayo delivered the Vincent Lingiari Memorial Lecture. He drew parallels between the struggle by land rights campaigner Vincent Lingiari to be heard by governments, and the struggles Indigenous peoples of Australia are experiencing.

In July 2023, a cartoon ad promoting the No campaign in the lead-up to the referendum on the Voice was published by Advance Australia in the Australian Financial Review, featuring caricatures of Mayo, along with MP and Yes advocate Kate Chaney, and her father businessman Michael Chaney. This led to bipartisan condemnation of the ad as "racist". The AFR later apologised for the ad.

As of November 2024, Mayo was an adviser to the Diversity Council Australia, one of six members of its Aboriginal and/or Torres Strait Islander External Advisory Panel, but is no longer a member as of March 2025.

== Other activities ==
Thomas Mayo is a public speaker who has delivered the 21st Vincent Lingiari Memorial Lecture at the Freedom Day Festival in August 2022 as well as the Aunty Evelyn Scott Memorial Lecture. In September 2024, Mayo delivered the Renate Kamener Oration at the University of Melbourne, entitled "The campaign for justice and recognition continues - What's next?".

== Publications ==
Thomas Mayo is the author of seven books as of October 2024, including several children's books, and had articles and essays published in The New York Times, The Guardian, Griffith Review and The Sydney Morning Herald.

In 2019 his essay "A dream that cannot be denied: On the road to Freedom Day", later published in the Griffith Review, was highly commended by the Horne Prize judges. It examines the legacy of the Wave Hill Walk-Off (Gurindji Strike) and the need for a First Nations Voice enshrined in the Constitution.

In his fourth book, Dear Son, subtitled Letters and Reflections from First Nations Fathers and Sons (2021), Thomas invited 12 Indigenous Australian contributors, including journalist Stan Grant, musician Troy Cassar-Daley, and artist Blak Douglas, to write a letter to their son, father, or nephew, showcasing heartfelt stories about life, masculinity, love, culture, and racism. The book addresses the stereotypes and prejudices that disempower Indigenous men, and in turn their families and communities, leading to the social issues that many of them face. In 2025, John Harvey and Isaac Drandic are co-creating a play of the same name based on the book. The play, featuring Jimi Bani and Trevor Jamieson, plays at the Bille Brown Theatre in Brisbane and then at the Odeon Theatre in Norwood, Adelaide, from June through to August 2025. It is co-produced by Queensland Theatre and State Theatre Company South Australia.

His book, The Voice to Parliament Handbook, co-authored with Kerry O'Brien and with cartoons by Cathy Wilcox, was awarded Australian Book Industry Awards Book of the Year, Non-Fiction Book of the Year, and Social Impact Book of the Year in 2024.

The book Our Flag, Our Story: The Torres Strait Islander Flag, co-authored by Thomas Mayo and Bernard Namok Jr in 2024, won the Aboriginal and Torres Strait Islander Children's Book Award at the 2024 Speech Pathology Australia Book of the Year Awards.

Thomas Mayo's book Always Was, Always Will Be – The Campaign for Justice and Recognition Continues was published in early September 2024 by Hardie Grant Books.

== Personal life ==
Mayo changed his surname from Mayor to Mayo in November 2022, reflecting the original spelling of his family name as seen on the tombstones of his ancestors.
