= Kennards Self Storage =

Australian self storage company

- Formerly: Easi-Stor; Kennards Mini Storage
- Company type: Private company
- Industry: Storage
- Founded: 1973
- Founder: Kennards Hire
- Headquarters: Sydney, Australia
- Number of locations: 101 (2023)
- Area served: Australia
- Services: Storage sheds
- Net income: A$328 million (2023)
- Owner: Kennard family
- Number of employees: 300 (2023)
- Website: kss.com.au

Kennards Self Storage is an Australian privately-owned self storage company.

== History ==
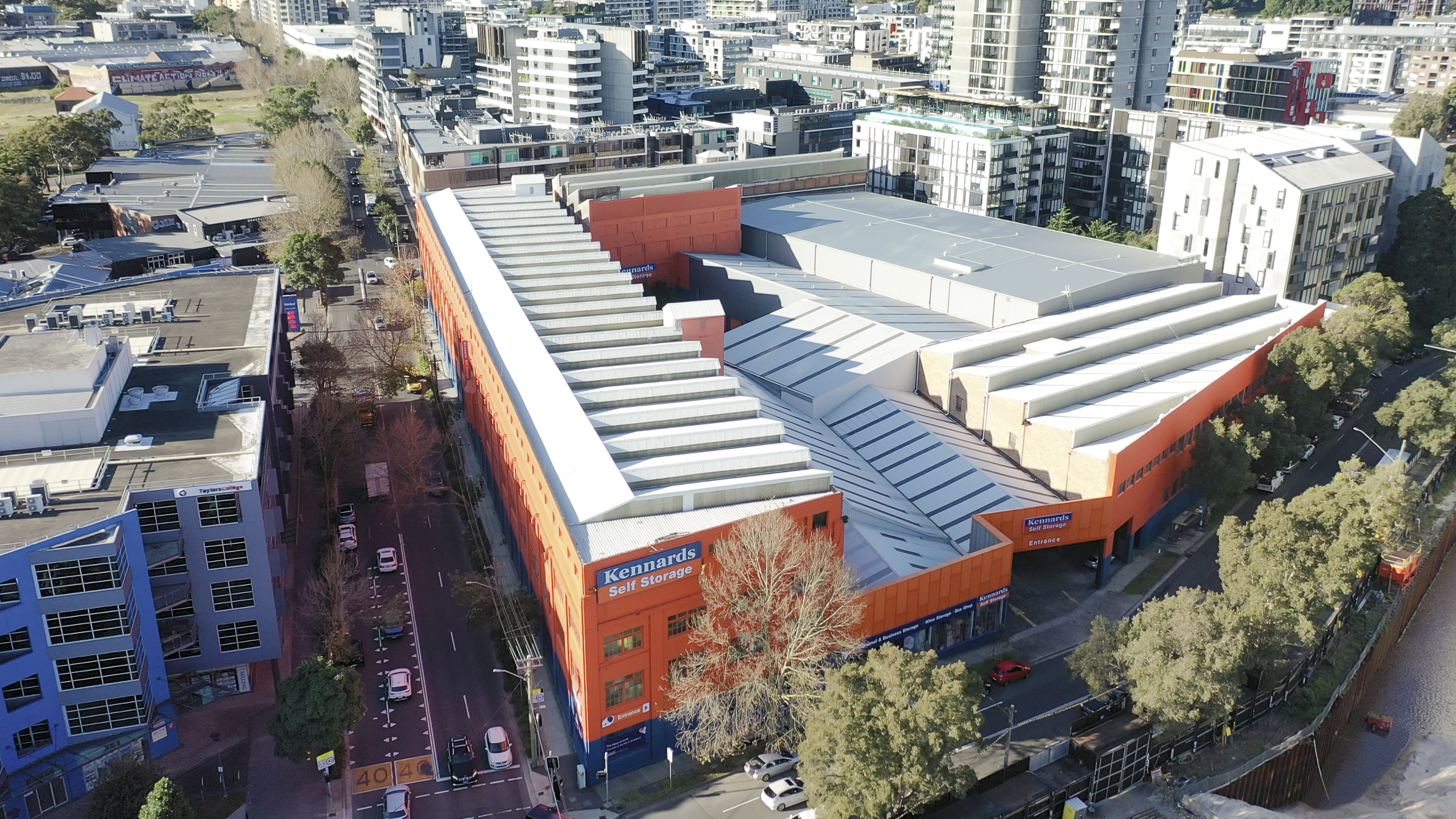
Kennards Self Storage, Waterloo (Sydney)

The company's roots lie in the establishment of Kennards Hire, when Walter Kennard founded W Kennard Agencies in Bathurst in 1948 selling equipment and machinery and becoming an agent for Caltex, Hillman, Humber and Lightburn. The concept of an equipment hire business came about when instead of a customer purchasing a concrete mixer, Kennard rented the equipment for a fee.

After relocating to Sydney, Kennards Hire established Australia's first self storage facility at the rear of its Moorebank, Sydney branch in 1973. Initially branded as Kennards Mini Storage it was renamed Easi-Stor in 1979. In 1981 a derelict wool store building in Fortitude Valley, Brisbane was purchased and redeveloped as Queensland’s first self storage centre. Nine further properties were subsequently purchased in Sydney, Newcastle and Brisbane during the 1980s.

In 1991, Andy and Neville Kennard who had taken over the business from their father, Walter, decided to split the business, with Andy retaining the hire equipment business and Neville taking the self storage business; renamed as Kennards Self Storage. A further 14 storage centres opened in the 1990s including the first in Victoria. Sam Kennard was appointed CEO in 1994, then aged 24 years, taking over from his father, Neville; and Sam's brothers, Walter (junior) and James, are also shareholders in the company.

In the early 2000’s the first of 20 wine storage locations opened. In 2004, 24 self storage properties were added in the $220 million acquisition of Millers Self Storage. This was completed in a 50:50 joint venture with Valad Property Group; and in 2008, Kennards became the sole operator of Millers.

The company expanded to New Zealand in 2007; and as of 2025, 112 facilities were operating across Australia and New Zealand.

== See also ==
- Kennards Hire
