= Lightburn & Co =

South Australian engineering and manufacturing company

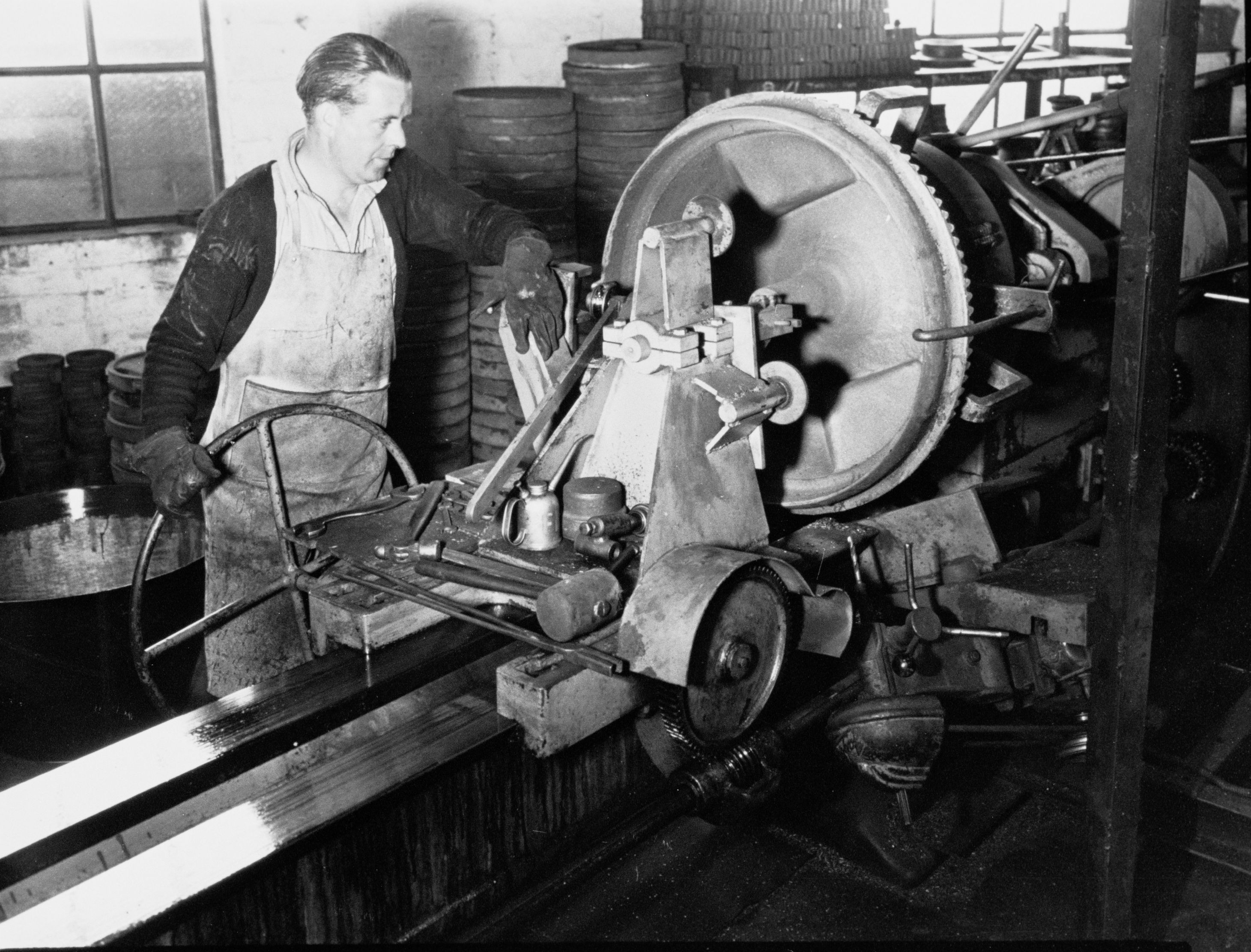
A factory worker at Lightburn & Co

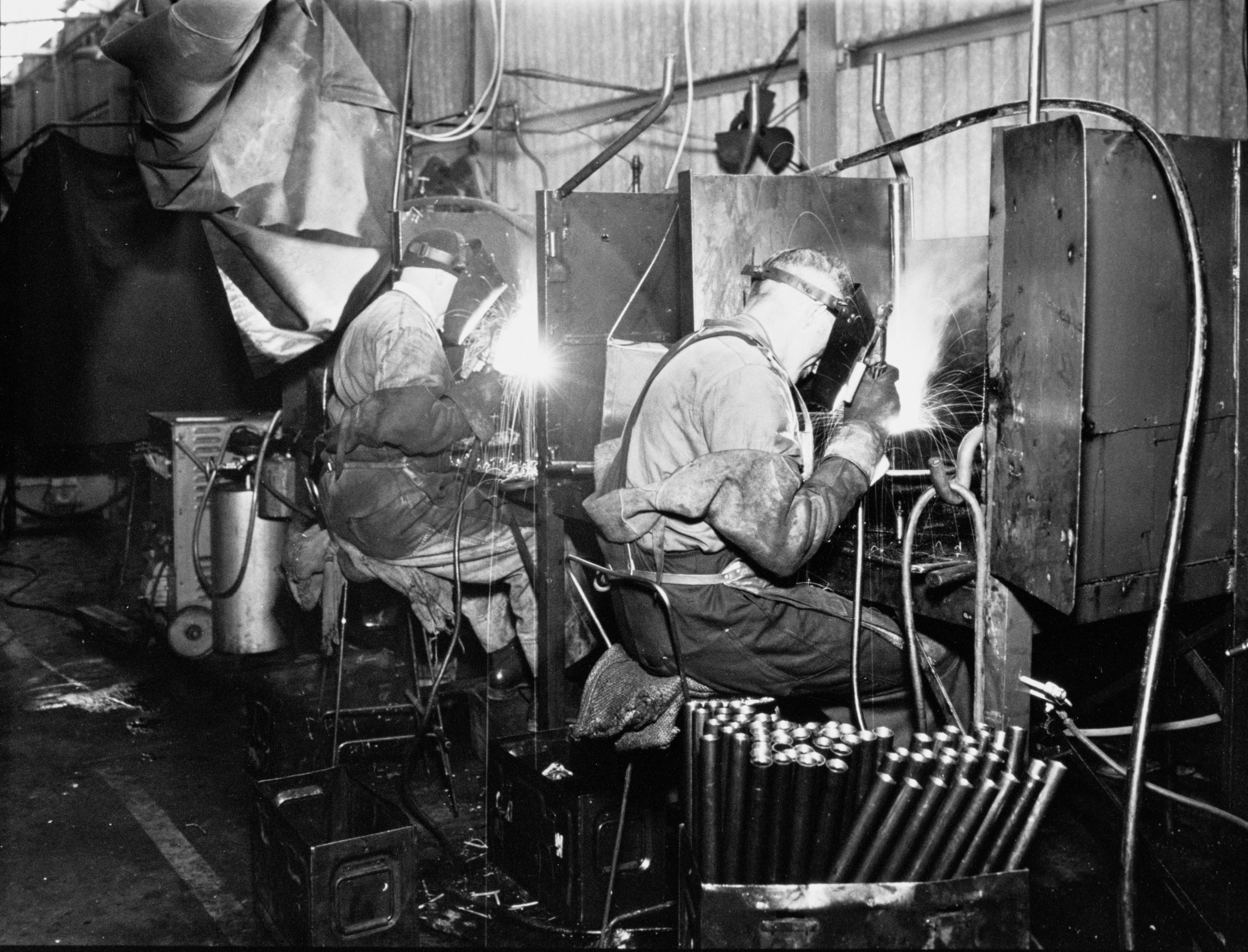
Stick welding bays

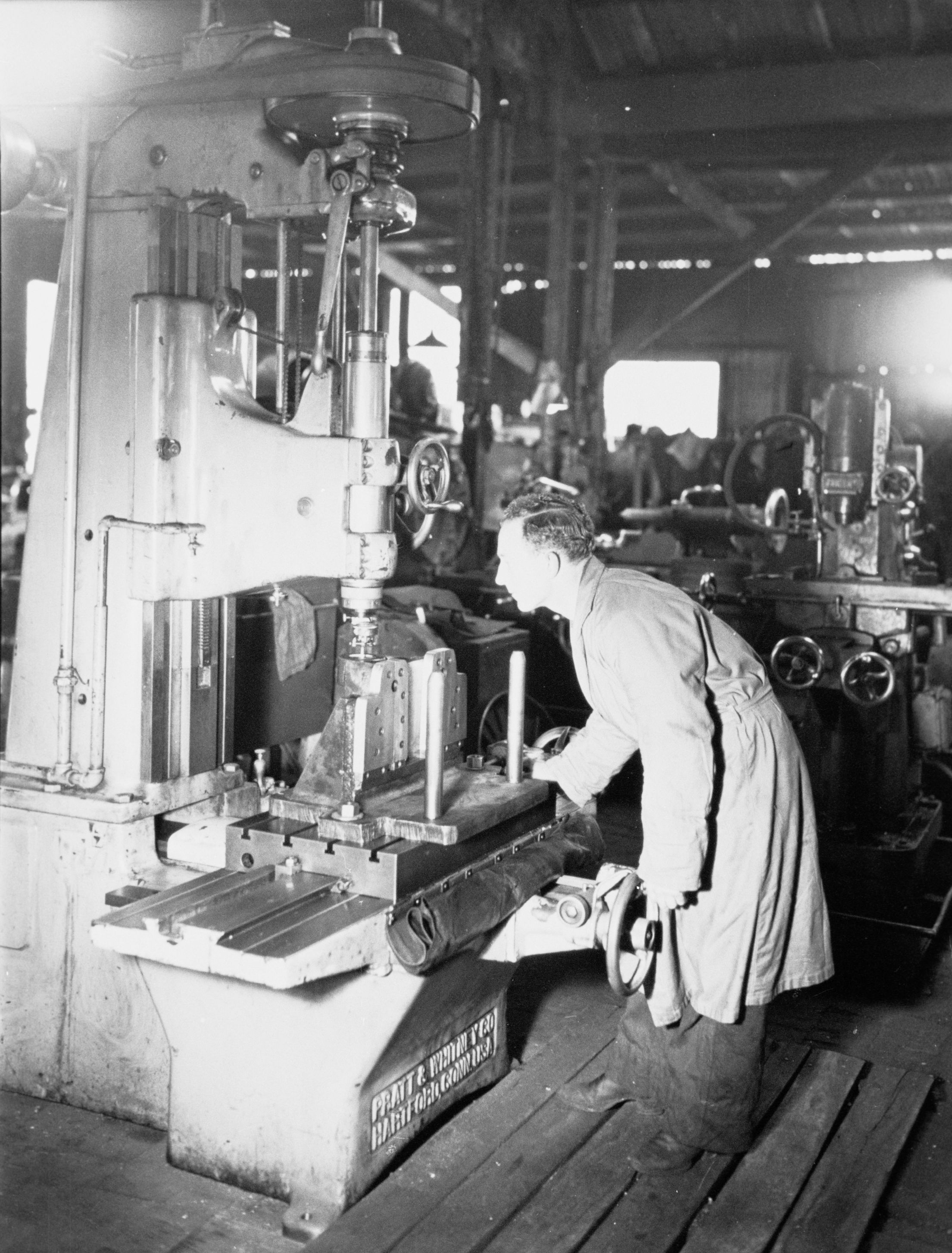
Pratt & Whitney milling machine

Lightburn & Company Limited was a South Australian engineering and manufacturing company.

== The founders ==
Albert Henry Lightburn (c. 1877 – 27 October 1940) was a son of Liverpool marine engineer John Bolton Lightburn (c. 1840 – 5 May 1916) and his wife Matilda Lightburn (13 May 1847 – 10 May 1930) who arrived in South Australia from England in 1898 and lived in Athelstone until after John's death, when she lived with Albert in Unley.

Albert attended fitting and turning classes at the School of Mines in 1910. He started a business around 1921 in the backyard of his 42 Arthur Street, Unley home, while running "Unley Motor Garage" as Lightburn & Gardner with William Gleed Gardner at 1 Unley Road, Unley. From June 1932 he ran the service station on his own account. He owned several general machining workshops in the city.

His son Harold Anderton Lightburn (9 April 1910 – 28 August 2002) was educated at Unley High School and started an apprenticeship at an engineering firm, studying at the School of Mines at night. He became unemployed in 1941 so started manufacturing equipment for automotive repair workshops. In 1944 he took over his father's business, and restructured it as a public company with a staff of 15. After his death, he was buried at the Scott Creek Cemetery.

Harold was one of South Australia's leading amateur boxers. In 1931 he won the State welter, middle. and heavy amateur titles, and retired from the ring in 1932 after winning the Australian amateur welterweight title, and shortly before his marriage. In his six-year career and 30 bouts he was defeated only once, and 9 of his 24 wins were by knockout. His trainer was Charlie "Red" Mitchell (c. 1907 – 30 July 1961). He served for several years as president of the South Australian Amateur Boxing and Wrestling Association.

=== Family ===
John Bolton Lightburn (c. 1840 – 5 May 1916) married Matilda Humphreys (c. June 1847 – 12 May 1930) on 14 January 1872

- Albert Henry Lightburn (c. 1877 – 27 October 1940) married Florence Amy Fry (c. 1879 – 26 July 1944) of Athelstone in 1903. Their children included:

- Jack Hiltoin Lightburn (1907 – 1986) married Jean Ethel Turnbull (1908 – 1984) on 30 October 1937
- Harold Anderton Lightburn (1910 – 2002) married Vera Liddicoat ( – 2009) on 21 January 1933
- Elva Florence Lightburn (1917 – 1995) married Cyril Gordon Tucker ( – 1983) on 12 January 1945

- Samuel Bolton Lightburn (1881 – 7 August 1939) married Ellen Stonehouse Parkin (16 March 1880 – 9 November 1966) in 1907, with Shell Petroleum, lived at Toorak Gardens

== Lightburn Limited ==
In July 1945 Lightburn & Company Limited was established to take over the assets of A. H. Lightburn and Company. 100 acres (40 ha) of vacant land off Morphett Road, Novar Gardens. Camden (previously the Camden Motordrome) was purchased in 1946. The Lightburn factories were on the northern side of Immanuel College, separated by an enclosed stormwater drain that runs from Forestville via Stonehouse Avenue, to the Sturt Creek.

The company's own employees cleared it, laid down roads, and set up a factory in seven aircraft hangars and by 1948 they were manufacturing a limited range of products. By 1950 they had 500 employees, and another 66 acres (27 ha) of adjoining land was purchased, and the firm's six premises on West Terrace, Franklin Street and 101 Flinders Street, Adelaide were consolidated into their complex on Morphett Road.

The company's products included brick moulds, "Lightning" brand concrete mixers, wheelbarrows, boats, power tools, trailers, wheels, hydraulic jacks, go-karts, range hoods, washing machines and spin driers. Lightburn began marketing domestic washing machines around 1949.

The company had a deserved reputation for unsophisticated, well-made, rugged reliable products, but a later venture, the Zeta automobile, manufactured from 1963 to 1965, was an unmitigated failure.

== Staff ==
Staff at Lightburn's included Harold Lightburn (managing director) W. R. Greig (general manager), C. C. Cosgrove (chairman of directors), and D. F. Cooper (secretary). The company introduced a collective incentive scheme under which employees received a share of company profits.

== See also ==
- List of South Australian manufacturing businesses
