= Woggabaliri =

Indigenous Australian game

Woggabaliri is a traditional Indigenous Australian co-operative kicking volley game. Described as a kicking game similar to soccer played in a group of four to six players in a circle, the game has been encouraged in schools in New South Wales and Queensland.

== Origin ==
=== Ken Edwards research ===
In 1999 Australian author Ken Edwards, then Associate Professor in Sport, Health and Physical Education at the Queensland University of Technology, published a book Choopadoo: Games from the Dreamtime, in which he makes mention of a game played by the Wiradjuri children near the Bogan River and Lachlan River. Historian David Thompson while investigating Aboriginal games, alleges that Edwards simply coined the term using an existing Aboriginal word and attributed it to various observations across outback Victoria and New South Wales. Ken Edwards and Troy Meston stated that the word Woggabaliri comes from the Wiradjuri word for "play". However according to the official Wiradjuri dictionary (as researched by Dr Stan Grant and Dr John Rudder) the word for play is wagigi. Robert Hamilton Mathews, studying Aboriginal Australian languages, listed the word woggabaliri in 1901 as the Ngunnawal word for "play".

The Australian Sports Commission (ASC) in 2000 cited permission to "use and adapt" Edwards' Choopadoo book to publish a derivative titled Indigenous Traditional Games, listing it as one of 19 games complete with lists of rules. The ASC's John Evans copied the descriptions of the games verbatim from Edwards' book, though further modified Woggabaliri with additional rules to make it suitable for contemporary children to play. Indigenous Traditional Games has subsequently been cited as a source for Woggabaliri by others, such as English-Australian fantasy author Malcom Walker.

=== Funding and grants based on Woggabaliri ===
In 2002 the ASC also funded the Laureus Sport for Good Foundation and Aboriginal and Torres Strait Islander Commission to promote Woggabaliri to schools as part of the Indigenous Sports program (ISC).

=== FIFA World Cup bids ===
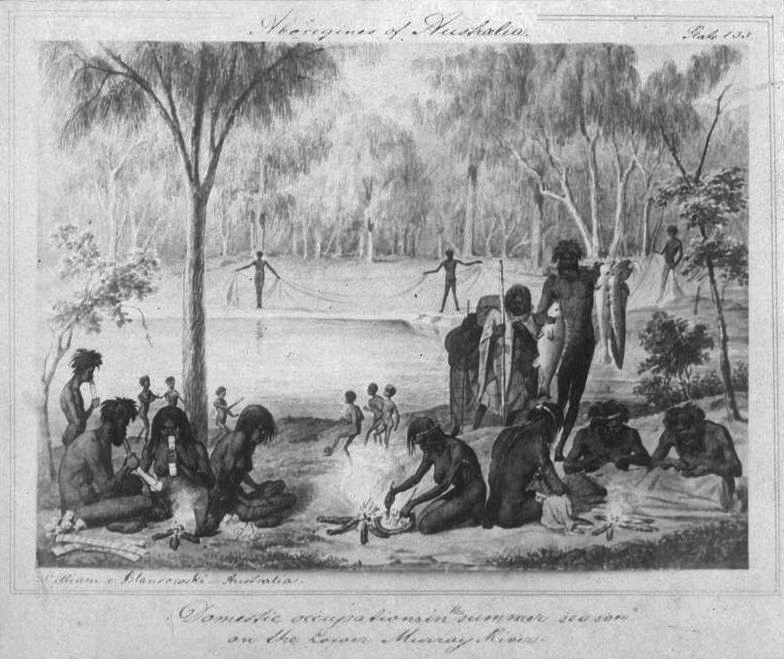
Gustav Mützel's 1862 interpretation of William Blandowski's 1857 depiction of an Australian Aboriginal domestic scene at Mondellimin

In 2007 Dr Patrick Greene, CEO of Museums Victoria, discovered Gustav Mützel's 1862 engravings of findings from the Blandowski expedition, including a depiction of Jarijari in 1857, observed at Mondellimin (now Merbein, Victoria). In the background of this engraving a child can be seen kicking the "ball" with others attempting to catch it, the caption translated from German reads "A group of children is playing with a ball. The ball is made out of typha roots (roots of the bulrush). It is not thrown or hit with a bat, but is kicked up in the air with a foot. The aim of the game - never let the ball touch the ground".

In 2010 Football Federation Australia (FFA) in its Australian 2022 FIFA World Cup bid, connected the Australian Sports Commission's Edwards-based game to Mützel's image and cited the similarity to football (soccer) as evidence that football (soccer) had a history in Australia stretching back thousands of years. Rod Allen, FFA media relations was quoted "We'd hope a wider knowledge of Woggabaliri might encourage more indigenous kids to play football".

=== John Maynard research ===
Historian John Maynard, in his 2011 book The Aboriginal Soccer Tribe, reiterating the FFA's attribution of Mützel's image, proclaimed it as Australia's first football game, and strongly link it to the modern game of association football (soccer). The 2011 bestseller received a Deadly Award for Outstanding Achievement in Literature. Maynard's book and its reference to Woggabaliri was subsequently widely cited. A passionate soccer fan, following his Ph.D at the University of Newcastle in 2003, Maynard began studying Aboriginal involvement in 2004, writing in 2008 of the significant under-representation of Indigenous Australians in the "world game" in comparison to Australian football. Former soccer player Craig Foster in 2011 wrote an opinion piece supporting Maynard's theory connecting Woggabaliri with soccer.

== Hoax claims ==
In 2010, Ian Syson of The Footy Almanac alleged that Woggabaliri was a hoax perpetrated by the Australian Sports Commission to further Australia's World Cup bid. He pointed out the similarity between the words "Woggabaliri" and "wogball", a derogatory Australian slang term for soccer, suggesting that the choice of name may be tongue-in-cheek.

Historian David Thompson is critical of Ken Edwards' evidence of Woggabaliri, claiming to having found no academic sources.

Map showing the various locations and distances involved in Woggabaliri

== Modern play ==
=== Basic rules ===
According to the NSW Office of Sport, it is a kicking game similar to soccer played in a group of four to six players in a circle 2 m (6 ft 7 in) apart and uses either a soccer ball, volleyball, or soft beach ball. It can be played by groups of four to six players standing in a circle using feet and knees only, in no set order but without consecutive touches, the players attempt to keep the ball from touching the ground. The group that has the most touches in a set time wins. If the ball touches the ground the count is restarted.

=== Team rules ===
Two teams of four play on a volleyball-court-sized pitch with football (soccer) goals at each end. A game consists of two halves lasting 10 minutes each. Players may use feet, knees, thighs, chest and head to keep the ball aloft with the team losing possession if the ball touches the ground, is intercepted or an infringement occurs. Tackling is not permitted, and goals can be scored from any part of the pitch.

== See also ==
- Marn Grook

== Sources ==
- Rudder, John; Grant, Stan (2005). A first Wiradjuri Dictionary: English to Wiradjuri and Categories. Restoration House. ISBN 978-0-869-42131-4.
- Rudder, John; Grant, Stan (2010). A New Wiradjuri Dictionary. Restoration House. ISBN 978-0-869-42150-5.
