= Kitty Hanley =

Wiradjuri matriarch and midwife (c. 1845 – 1917)

Kitty Hanley also known as Kate Hanley (c. 1845 – 11 February 1917) was a Wiradjuri matriarch and midwife who had significant skills in tracking and traditional healing; much of which she passed on to her children. She is known to have more than 630 descendants.

== Biography ==
Little is known of Hanley's early life although it is likely that she was born on the Lachlan River somewhere between the two European settlements of Forbes and Condobolin in the mid-1840s. Her father was Henry Hanley, who was most likely a convict and pastoral worker, and her mother, a Wiradjuri woman was recorded only as Nancy.

By around 1870 Hanley was married to an Aboriginal man known as King Solomon and they lived together on Mungery Station where many Wiradjuri people lived as it had strong ceremonial value for them and had long been a gathering point. The Wiradjuri language meaning of Mungery is "swampy black soil" and its fertile soil had attracted pastoralists. There they had three children; Edward Solomon (c.1871–1939), Jane Frost (c. 1872–1942) and Alexander Solomon (c. 1874–1933).

Hanley and Solomon raised there children as traditionally as possible and they taught them traditional bush skills, such as tracking and traditional healing, from a young age as she wanted to be sure that these skills would be passed on. Hanley and Solomon also took them to ceremonial gathering being held throughout the region. It is likely that Hanley and Solomon separated before his death but when he died in the mid-1870s Hanley was left to raise her young children alone until she formed a relationship with Robert Robinson, known as 'Bogan Bob', an Englishman.

Hanley and Robinson had two children together in their first years together, Amy Burns (b. 1876 – ?) and George Robinson (c.1879 – ?). In around 1879 they settled together at another pastoral property in the region, Graddle Station, and they married there on 8 October 1879. On Graddle they were given a cottage to live and Hanley would have another six children over the following seven years. One of these children was Charles Robinson, who was born in September 1884, and lived for only a month.

In many of her births Hanley was assisted by an Aboriginal midwife, Sarah Smith (née Hill) and would come to assist her and trained as a midwife under her. They would not only assist in the birth of the babies in the European way but also perform ceremonies to ease pain and reduce bleeding. Additionally they would perform ceremonies in relations to the babies' spiritual connection to country and their totem.

Around 1895 Hanley's relationship with Robinson broke down and she, alongside her younger children, left and moved to Obley where they lived together within an Aboriginal community. Here she formed a relationship with John May Merritt, a gold prospector, who was some years younger than her. Their relationship was often fraught and, following an argument in July 1897, Merritt attempted to commit suicide and was only saved by Hanley's medical knowledge. When he was taken the Dubbo Hospital for treatment after the incident the doctor stated that no further care was necessary and her stitching was so 'expertly done'.

She spent much of her later years working as a midwife and assisting in births throughout the region, including for many of her own grandchildren.

Hanley died on 11 February 1917 at Bulgandramine, where she lived at the Aboriginal Mission, and she left behind her a large family. Research conducted in the 2010s shows that she has more than 630 descendants.
