= NAIDOC Awards =

Annual awards for Australian Indigenous people

The NAIDOC Awards are annual Australian awards conferred on Australian Aboriginal and Torres Strait Islander individuals during the national celebration of the history, culture and achievements of Australian Aboriginal and Torres Strait Islander peoples known as NAIDOC Week. The name is derived from the National Aborigines and Islanders Day Observance Committee.

== The committee ==
The awards are named after the committee that was originally responsible for organising the national activities to mark NAIDOC Week, the National Aborigines and Islanders Day Observance Committee. Each year, a different city hosts the National NAIDOC Awards Ceremony. The host city, National NAIDOC Poster Competition and the NAIDOC Awards recipients are selected by the National NAIDOC Committee. The awards are presented at the annual NAIDOC Awards Ceremony and Ball.

== Categories ==
The names of the categories have varied over time. In 1985 Awards for Aboriginal of the Year, and for Aboriginal young people aged 12 to 25 were introduced.

As of 2022 the categories comprise:

- Person of the Year
- Lifetime Achievement Award
- Female Elder Award
- Male Elder Award
- Sportsperson Award
- Youth Award
- Creative Talent Award
- Caring for Country and Culture Award
- Education Award
- Innovation Award

== Poster ==
The first NAIDOC poster was created in 1972 to promote "Aborigines Day", which had been established as part of a campaign for better rights for Aboriginal people. The posters continued to reflect the spirit of protest until 1977, with titles like "Self Determination" and "Chains or Chance". The 1978 poster was different, reflecting the move from a single day of demonstration to a celebration lasting a week each July, after the new committee was established. The 1988 poster, "Recognise and Share the Survival of the Oldest Culture in the World" reflected the name change to NAIDOC, which formally included Torres Strait Islander people in the event. In the 1990s a competition to design the poster was introduced.

== Winners 2021–2030 ==
=== 2026 winners ===
2026 recipients.

- Lifetime Achievement Award - Rhoda Roberts
- Person of the year: Aunty Pat Turner
- Female Elder of the year: Christine Corby
- Male Elder of the year: Dr Stephen Hagan
- Sportsperson of the year: Caitlyn Costello
- Youth of the year: Tyson Neal-Edwards
- Creative talent award: Kaylene Whiskey
- Caring for country and culture award: Southern Aboriginal Corporation
- Education award: The Aboriginal & Islander Independent Community School (The Murri School)
- Innovation award: Young Indigenous Women’s STEM Academy

=== 2025 winners ===
2025 recipients:

- Lifetime Achievement Award – Michael Long
- Person Award – Dr Daniel Hunt
- Female Elder Award – Aunty Rosalie Kickett
- Male Elder Award – Uncle Harry Hall
- Sportsperson Award – Danielle Ponter
- Youth Award – Anika Gosling
- Creative Talent Award – Christine Anu
- Caring for Country and Culture Award – Wadjemup Project Steering Group
- Education Award – Professor Eddie Cubillo
- Innovation Award – Blak Brews

=== 2024 winners ===
2024 recipients:

- Lifetime Achievement Award – Aunty Dulcie Flower
- Person Award – Aunty Muriel Bamblett
- Female Elder Award – Aunty Millie Ingram
- Male Elder Award – Mr Kim Collard
- Sportsperson Award – Alex Winwood
- Youth Award – Dante Rodrigues
- Creative Talent Award – Naarah
- Caring for Country and Culture Award – Alick Tipoti
- Education Award – Warlpiri Education and Training Trust
- Innovation Award – Tui Nolan

=== 2023 winners ===
- Lifetime Achievement – Aunty Dr Naomi Mayers OAM
- Person of the Year – Professor Kelvin Kong
- Female Elder of the Year Award – Aunty Dr Matilda House-Williams
- Male Elder of the Year – William Tilmouth
- Sportsperson of the Year – Donnell Wallam
- Youth of the Year – Courtney Burns
- Creative Talent – Rachel Perkins
- Caring for Country and Culture – Lala Gutchen
- Education Award – Bubup Wilam Aboriginal Child and Family Centre
- Innovation Award – Daniel Motlop

=== 2022 winners ===
The awards ceremony was held in Melbourne on 2 July 2022. The winners are:

- Person of the Year — Ash Barty AO
- Lifetime Achievement Award – Stan Grant Snr AM
- Female Elder Award – Lois Peeler AM
- Male Elder Award – Uncle Jack Charles
- Sportsperson Award – Buddy Franklin
- Youth Award – Elijah Manis
- Creative Talent Award – Lowell Hunter
- Caring for Country and Culture Award – Walter Jackson
- Education Award – Bronwyn Fredericks
- Innovation Award – The Koori Mail team and volunteers, for their "coordination and leadership" of relief efforts after the record-breaking March 2022 floods in Lismore

=== 2021 winners ===
The 2021 National NAIDOC Awards ceremony in Alice Springs (Mparntwe) was cancelled. An alternative NAIDOC Awards event was planned for 3 July 2021 at the Sydney Opera House, but was postponed. As Sydney went into a COVID-19 lockdown on 23 June, rules for travellers returning to the Northern Territory meant that most people could not attend the Sydney event without a 14-day quarantine. The award-winners were announced on 1 December 2021. The winners are:

- Lifetime Achievement Award – Pat O'Shane AM
- Person of the Year – Keri Tamwoy
- Female Elder of the Year – Christobel Swan
- Male Elder of the Year – Ernest Hoolihan
- Caring for Country – Gadrian Hoosan on behalf of the Borroloola Community
- Youth of the Year – Samara Fernandez-Brown
- Artist of the Year – Bobbi Lockyer
- Scholar of the Year – Sasha Purcell
- Apprentice of the Year – Jarron Andy
- Sportsperson of the Year – Clarence "CJ" McCarthy-Grogan

== Winners 2011–2020 ==
=== 2020 winners ===
- Due to the impact and uncertainty of the COVID-19 pandemic in Australia the National NAIDOC Committee cancelled the 2020 National NAIDOC Awards. The National Indigenous Australians Agency announced the 2020 awards would be presented in July 2021 with the 2021 awards.

=== 2019 winners ===
- Sportsperson of the Year – Shantelle Thompson
- Female Elder of the Year – Thelma Weston
- Male Elder of the Year – Greg Little
- Person of the Year – Dean Duncan
- Artist of the Year – Elma Gada Kris
- Youth of the Year – Mi-kaisha Masella
- Lifetime achievement award – David Gulpilil Ridjimiraril Dalaithngu
- Caring for Country – Littlewell Working Group
- Scholar of the Year – Professor Michael McDaniel
- Apprentice of the Year – Ganur Maynard

=== 2018 winners ===
- Sportsperson of the Year – Jack Peris
- Female Elder of the Year – Lynette Nixon
- Male Elder of the Year – Russell Charles Taylor AM
- Person of the Year – Dr June Oscar AO
- Artist of the Year – Adam Briggs "Briggs"
- Youth of the Year – Tamina Pitt
- Lifetime achievement award – Patricia Anderson AO
- Caring for Country – Mungalla Aboriginal Business Corporation in North Queensland
- Scholar of the Year – Professor Michelle Trudgett
- Apprentice of the Year – Folau Talbot

=== 2017 winners ===
- Sportsperson of the Year – Amanda Reid
- Female Elder of the Year – Faye Carr
- Male Elder of the Year – Alex "Ollie" George
- Person of the Year – Patrick "Patty" Mills
- Artist of the Year – Elverina Johnson
- Youth of the Year – Latia Schefe
- Lifetime achievement award – Dianne Ryder
- Caring for Country – Minjerribah Moorgumpin Elders-in-Council Aboriginal Corporation (QLD)
- Scholar of the Year – Dr James Charles
- Apprentice of the Year – Sharee Yamashita

=== 2016 winners ===
- Sportsperson of the Year – Jade North
- Female Elder of the Year – MaryAnn Bin-Sallik
- Male Elder of the Year – Robert Francis Isaacs
- Person of the Year – Goreng Goreng man Professor Chris Sarra
- Artist of the Year – Geoffrey Gurrumul Yunupingu
- Youth of the Year – Elijah Douglas
- Lifetime achievement award – Stephen Page
- Caring for Country – Manymak Energy Efficiency Project (NT)
- Scholar of the Year – Layneisha Sgro
- Apprentice of the Year – Montana Ah-Won

=== 2015 winners ===
- Youth of the Year – Chris Tamwoy
- Apprentice of the Year – Ashley Farrall
- Artist of the Year – Daren Dunn
- Poster competition winner – Elaine Chambers
- Caring for Country – Warddeken Caring for Country Project
- Female Elder of the Year – Veronica Perrule Dobson
- Male Elder of the Year – Graham Taylor
- Lifetime Achievement Award – Tauto Sansbury
- Person of the Year – Rosalie Kunoth-Monks
- Scholar of the Year – Michelle Deshong
- Sportsperson of the Year – Ryan Morich

=== 2014 winners ===
- Youth of the Year – Chern’ee Sutton
- Youth of the Year – Amelia Telford
- Apprentice of the Year – Patricia Doolan
- Artist of the Year – Shellie Morris
- Poster competition winner – Harry Alfred Pitt
- Caring for Country – The Uunguu Healthy Country Project
- Lifetime Achievement Award – Linda Burney
- Person of the Year – Gracelyn Smallwood
- Female Elder of the Year – Patricia O'Connor
- Male Elder of the Year – Richard Archibald
- Scholar of the Year – Donisha Duff
- Sportsperson of the Year – Jesse Williams

=== 2013 winners ===
- Youth of the Year – Kate Malpass
- Apprentice of the Year – Danny Bromot
- Artist of the Year – Tony Briggs
- Poster competition winner – Gail Naden
- Caring for Country – Jimmy Edgar
- Lifetime Achievement Award – Galarrwuy Yunupingu
- Person of the Year – Darryl Kickett
- Female Elder of the Year – Rose Richards
- Male Elder of the Year – John Hayden
- Scholar of the Year – Dr Mark McMillan
- Sportsperson of the Year – Johnathan Thurston

=== 2012 winners ===
- Youth of the Year – Benson Saulo
- Apprentice of the Year – Michael Clinch
- Artist of the Year – Stephen Page
- Poster competition winner – Juundaal Strang-Yettica
- Caring for Country – Bunya Bunya Country Aboriginal Corporation
- Lifetime Achievement Award – Bunna Lawrie
- Person of the Year – David Wirrpanda
- Female Elder of the Year – Margaret Lawton
- Female Elder of the Year – Maureen Kelly
- Male Elder of the Year – Hezekiel Jingoonya
- Scholar of the Year – Sarah Bourke
- Sportsperson of the Year – Vanessa Wilson
- Sportsperson of the Year – Joshua Robinson
- Torres Strait Artist of the Year – Alick Tipoti

=== 2011 winners ===
- Youth of the Year – Kiel Williams-Weigel
- Apprentice of the Year – Joshua Toomey
- Artist of the Year – Robyn Djunginy
- Poster competition winner – Matthew Humphries
- Lifetime Achievement Award – Ned Cheedy
- Caring for Country – Warru Recovery Team
- Person of the Year – Terri Janke
- Female Elder of the Year – Carolyn Briggs
- Male Elder of the Year – Eldridge Mosby
- Scholar of the Year – Professor Lester-Irabinna Rigney
- Sportsperson of the Year – Preston Campbell

== Winners 2001–2010 ==
=== 2010 winners ===
- Youth of the Year – Jessica Smith
- Apprentice of the Year – Lucas Kickett
- Artist of the Year – Lewis Langton
- Poster competition winner – Sheree Blackley
- Caring for Country – Crazy Ant Management Program
- Lifetime Achievement Award – Vince Coulthard
- Person of the Year – Dennis Eggington
- Female Elder of the Year – Ali Golding
- Male Elder of the Year – Ali Drummond
- Male Elder of the Year – Lester Bostock
- Scholar of the Year – Megan Davis
- Sportsperson of the Year – Rohanee Cox

=== 2009 winners ===
- Youth of the Year – Gemma Benn
- Apprentice of the Year – Danny Sebasio
- Artist of the Year – Wayne Quilliam
- Poster competition winner – Luke Mallie
- Lifetime Achievement Award – Lowitja O'Donoghue
- Person of the Year – Larissa Behrendt
- Male Elder of the Year – Reg Knox
- Male Elder of the Year – Frank Lampard
- Female Elder of the Year – Elsie Heiss
- Female Elder of the Year – Doris Eaton
- Scholar of the Year – Dr Chelsea Bond
- Sportsperson of the Year – Andrew McLeod

=== 2009 winners ===
- Torres Strait Senior Cultural Award – Alick Tipoti

=== 2008 winners ===
- Youth of the Year – Krista Moir
- Youth of the Year – Angeline Blackburn
- Apprentice of the Year – Amy McQuire
- Artist of the Year – Les Elvin
- Poster competition winner – Duwun (Tony) Lee and Laniyuk (Ian) Lee
- Lifetime Achievement Award – Archie Roach
- Lifetime Achievement Award – Joseph Elu
- Lifetime Achievement Award – Chicka Dixon
- Person of the Year – Colleen Hayward
- Male Elder of the Year – Bob Muir
- Female Elder of the Year – Carol Petterson
- Scholar of the Year – Dr Karen Martin
- Sportsperson of the Year – Stacey Porter

=== 2007 winners ===
- Youth of the Year – Simone Liddy
- Apprentice of the Year – Hamid Bin Saad
- Artist of the Year – Leah Purcell
- Poster competition winner – Tyeli Hannah
- Lifetime Achievement Award – John (Jak) Ah Kit
- Person of the Year – Mark Bin Bakar
- Female Elder of the Year – Dr Ruby Langford Ginibi
- Male Elder of the Year – Boyd Scully
- Male Elder of the Year – Jim Hagan (Snr)
- Scholar of the Year – Dr Yin Carl Paradies
- Sportsperson of the Year – Robert Crowther

=== 2006 winners ===
- Youth of the Year – Jo-Anne D'Cress
- Artist of the Year – Warren H. Williams
- Poster competition winner – Charmaine Green
- Lifetime Achievement Award – Elizabeth Morgan Hoffman
- Person of the Year – Stephen Hagan (Jnr)
- Female Elder of the Year – Judy Tatow
- Male Elder of the Year – Vince Ross
- Scholar of the Year – Dr Chris Sara
- Sportsperson of the Year – Patrick Mills

=== 2005 winners ===
- Youth of the Year – Joleen Ryan
- Artist of the Year – Kerrianne Cox
- Poster competition winner – Benjamin Hodges
- Lifetime Achievement Award – Arthur Murray
- Person of the Year – Cheryl Buchanan
- Person of the Year – Rodney Dillon
- Female Elder of the Year – Mary Jane Ware
- Male Elder of the Year – Albert Holt
- Scholar of the Year – Simon Forrest
- Sportsperson of the Year – Pam Pedersen

=== 2004 winners ===
- Youth of the Year – Michael Hayden
- Artist of the Year – Jirra Lulla Harvey
- Poster competition winner – Jirra Lulla Harvey
- Person of the Year – Aden Ridgeway
- Elder of the Year – Merlene Mead
- Male Elder of the Year – Steve Mam
- Scholar of the Year – Kaye Price
- Sportsperson of the Year – Adam Goodes

=== 2003 winners ===
- Youth of the Year – Stacey Kelly-Greenup
- Artist of the Year – Belynda Waugh
- Poster competition winner – Belynda Waugh
- Person of the Year – Deborah Mailman
- Female Elder of the Year – Violet French
- Male Elder of the Year – William Kennedy
- Scholar of the Year – Frederick Penny
- Sportsperson of the Year – David Peachey

=== 2002 winners ===
- Youth of the Year – Bruce 'Borro' Johnson
- Apprentice/Trainee of the Year – Michelle Tyhuis
- Poster competition winner – Juundaal Strang-Yettica
- Person of the Year – Steve Gordon
- Male Elder of the Year – Lyal Munro Snr and Peter Coppin (Joint winners)
- Female Elder of the Year – Ida West
- Scholar of the Year – Tracey Westerman
- Sportsperson of the Year – Bo Delacruz
- Special Achievement Award – Dr Shane Fernando

=== 2001 winners ===
- Youth of the Year – Vanessa Elliot
- Apprentice/Trainee of the Year – Todd Phillips
- Poster competition winner – Marika Baumgart
- Person of the Year – Kutcha Edwards
- Female Elder of the Year – Alice 'Mummy' Clark
- Male Elder of the Year – Cec Fisher
- Scholar of the Year – Dr Cheryl Kickett-Tucker
- Sportsperson of the Year – Warren Lawton

== Winners 1991–2000 ==
=== 2000 winners ===
- Youth of the Year – Marie Dennis
- Apprentice/Trainee of the Year – Alison Gear
- Artist of the Year – Jimmy Wavehill
- Poster competition winner – Cecily Wellington
- Person of the Year – Anthony Mundine
- Female Elder of the Year – Yvonne Agius
- Male Elder of the Year – James Rice
- Scholar of the Year – Marlina Whop
- Sportsperson of the Year – Troy Murphy

=== 1999 winners ===
- Youth of the Year – Samantha Cook and Jeremy Geia (Joint winners)
- Apprentice/Trainee of the Year – Gary Bonney
- Artist of the Year – Wenten Rubuntja
- Poster Competition Winner – Warick Keen
- Person of the Year – Bob Randall
- Male Elder of the Year – Geoff Shaw
- Female Elder of the Year – Zona Martin
- Scholar of the Year – Tracey Brand
- Sportsperson of the Year – Nicky Winmar
- Torres Strait Senior Cultural Award – Alick Tipoti

=== 1998 winners ===
- Youth of the Year – Nicole Casser and Delson Stokes Jnr (Joint winners)
- Apprentice/Trainee of the Year – June Djaigween
- Artist of the Year – Raymond Blanco
- Poster Competition Winner – Ray Thomas
- Person of the Year – Pat Dodson and Mick Dodson (Joint winners)
- Male Elder of the Year – George Mye
- Female Elder of the Year – Queenie McKenzie
- Scholar of the Year – Raymond (Jack) Gibson
- Sportsperson of the Year – Ali Drummond

=== 1997 winners ===
- Youth of the Year – Kyle Morrison
- Apprentice/Trainee of the Year – Kasey Wehrman
- Artist of the Year – Ron Corbett
- Poster Competition Winner – Eleanor Binge
- Person of the Year – Ray Robinson
- Male Elder of the Year – Eric Walker
- Female Elder of the Year – Una Walker
- Scholar of the Year – John Williams Mozeley
- Sportsperson of the Year – Kasey Wehrman
- Miss NAIDOC – Vicky Hextall

=== 1996 winners ===
- Youth of the Year – Yvonne Marika
- Apprentice/Trainee of the Year – Jade Johnson
- Artist of the Year – Jonathon Brown
- Poster Competition Winner –
- Aboriginal and Torres Strait Islander of the Year – Tauto Sansbury
- Elder of the Year – Freda Winmar
- Scholar of the Year – Jill Abdulla
- Aboriginal Sportsperson of the Year – Derek Kickett
- Miss National NAIDOC – Nevanka McKeon

=== 1995 winners ===
- Youth of the Year – Timothy Lilley
- Apprentice of the Year – Robert Hudson
- Poster competition winner – Ian Wallan Hill
- Aboriginal of the Year – Reg Blow
- Artist of the Year – Richard Mullet
- Scholar of the Year – Graham Atkinson
- Sportsperson of the Year – Rohan Best

=== 1994 winners ===
- Youth of the Year – Vanessa Fitzgerald
- Apprentice/Trainee of the Year – Darren Braydon
- Artist of the Year – Rex Murray
- Poster Competition Winner – Dale Huddleston and Scott Towney
- Person of the Year – Ernie Dingo
- Scholar of the Year – Rosie Smith
- Sportsperson of the Year – Kyle Vander Kuyp

=== 1993 winners ===
- Youth of the Year – Natalie Barney
- Apprentice of the Year – Barry Fewquandie
- Artist of the Year – Roger Knox
- Aboriginal of the Year – Charles Perkins
- Scholar of the Year – Damien Miller / Glenda Kickett
- Sportsperson of the Year – Lachlan Wright

=== 1992 winners ===
- Youth of the Year – Shane Simpson
- Apprentice of the Year – David Pidek
- Artist of the Year – Danny Eastwood and John Harding (joint winners)
- Poster Competition Winner – Heather Shearer
- Aboriginal of the Year – Mrs Geraldine Briggs
- Scholar of the Year – Natalie Barney
- Sportsperson of the Year – Robert Peden

=== 1991 winners ===
- Aboriginal of the Year – David Wowaljarlai
- Junior Award – Les Ritchie-Corlett
- Poster Competition Winner – Ron Hurley

== Winners 1985–1990 ==
=== 1990 winners ===
- Aboriginal of the Year – Shirley Smith (Mum Shirl)

=== 1989 winners ===
- Aboriginal of the Year – Jimmy Little

=== 1988 winners ===
- Youth of the Year – Cain Muir
- Apprentice of the Year – Shaun Thompson
- Artist of the Year – Ramingining Artists Community
- Poster Competition Winner –
- Aboriginal of the Year – Alice Kelly
- Scholar of the Year – Ron James
- Sportsperson of the Year – Tony Currie

=== 1987 winners ===
- Youth of the Year – Ron Ingram
- Apprentice of the Year – Alanna Speedy
- Artist of the Year – Jack Wunuwun
- Poster Competition Winner – Lawrie Nilsen
- Aboriginal of the Year – Sister Joan Winch
- Aboriginal Scholar of the Year – Norma Joshua
- Aboriginal Sportsperson of the Year – Catherine Hillard

=== 1986 winners ===
- Apprentice of the Year – Thomas Wear
- Artist of the Year – James Agius
- Poster Competition Winner –
- Aboriginal of the Year – Kathy Mills
- Scholar of the Year – Eve Fesl
- Sportswoman of the Year – Phynea Clarke
- Sportsman of the Year – Warren Lawton

=== 1985 winners ===
- Apprentice of the Year – Lester Rigney
- Artist of the Year – Justine Saunders
- Poster Competition Winner –
- Aboriginal of the Year – Kath Walker
- Scholar of the Year – Rhonda Dadleh
- Sportsperson of the Year – Kyle Vander Kuyp

== See also ==
- Deadly Awards
- NAIDOC Week
