= Wayne Quilliam =

Aboriginal Australian photographic artist, curator and cultural adviser

- Born: 1963 (age 62–63); Hobart, Tasmania, Australia
- Spouse: Jodie
- Children: Nathan Aaron Tanisha
- Website: www.aboriginal.photography

Wayne Quilliam (born 1963) is an Aboriginal Australian photographic artist, curator, videographer, drone pilot and cultural adviser based in Melbourne. He specializes in portraits and landscapes of Indigenous people across the globe. He is the owner of Australia's most prominent Aboriginal owned wine label Mt Yengo Wines www.mtyengowines.com.au and is the artist for the labels.

== Early life ==
Quilliam was born in Hobart, Tasmania, and raised in the suburb of Risdon Vale. As a child, he spent time in the bush around the Great Lakes and Central Tasmania where he learned about the land from his uncles and grandfather. His cultural learning has been attributed to connecting with Australian mainland Indigenous communities in his early years in which he has lived and worked for more than 40 years.

== Career ==
Quilliam joined the Royal Australian Navy in 1979. He acquired his first camera in 1980 while stationed in Hong Kong.

Quilliam bought dark-room equipment from a customer whose chimney he was sweeping.

He later worked at an aboriginal newspaper, the Koori Mail.

He teaches as an adjunct professor at RMIT University in the School of Media and Communication.

== Work ==
Quilliam's work includes a lifetime of documenting significant Indigenous events, including the Sorry speech, the 1967 Referendum Anniversary, and Garma, Laura, DanceRites and the majority of Indigenous gatherings across the country. He has estimated that he has visited between 300 and 400 aboriginal communities.

Wayne has worked with Indigenous groups in Cuba, Mexico, Bolivia, Vietnam, Laos, Cambodia, Indonesia and Guam, developing intercultural art and cultural exchanges for global exhibitions.

His ‘Lowanna’ series infuses textures of earth onto the human form, while his ‘Towindri’ landscape art and ‘Smoke’ exhibition explores the cultural significance of smoking ceremonies.

He is the official photographer for the Garma Festival of Traditional Cultures in Arnhem Land.

== Exhibitions ==
Quilliam has held solo exhibitions in Havana, Tokyo, Mexico City, Caracas, New York City and Los Angeles, Berlin, Sydney, Melbourne, Adelaide, Perth and featured at the United Nations, New York and Geneva 4 times. It is estimated his photographic exhibition of the ‘Apology’, ‘Sorry more than a Word’ that opened at Parliament House in Canberra has been experienced by more than a quarter of a million people and continues to attract large audiences as it travels the world.

These shows continue his international successes from the Museum of Young Art, Vienna, several galleries in Berlin, Cologne, Düsseldorf, Hamburg as well as Russia, Guam, Indonesia and numerous galleries in Australia. His ‘Towindri’ exhibition in Cairo toured Riyadh and Beirut in 2014.

Wayne Quilliam is the creator and curator of the Indigenous immersive experience 'Connection', at the National Museum in Canberra, then the Lume in Melbourne, and in the USA.

- Shades of Black (late 2004 - January 2005); Kluge-Ruhe Gallery, Virginia, United States
- HOME (2012); Wyndham Art Gallery, Wyndham City, Victoria
- Instaculture (July–August 2019); amBUSH Gallery, Sydney, New South Wales
- DJIWARR (April–August 2020)
- Earth Burns, Water Cries (July–September 2021); Venetian Media Group, South Yarra, Victoria

== Personal life ==
Quilliam is "a freshwater man from Tasmania". He has been with his wife, Jodie, since the early 2000s. The couple have a daughter. He has two sons and 4 grandchildren.

== Books ==
- Culture is Life (2021); Hardie Grant
- Wayne Quilliam Culture is Life 2024

== Awards ==
He has won AIMSC Business of the Year, and been nominated as a Master of Photography by National Geographic. He was a finalist in the PrixPictet in Paris and in the Bowness Art Award.

- 2008 Human Rights Media Award
- 2008 Walkley Award
- 2009 NAIDOC Artist of the Year
- 2019 Survival International 2020 Calendar Photo Competition
- 2022 National Photographic Portrait Prize
- 2025 National Digital Innovation Award
- 2025
