= Yin Paradies =

Australian public health researcher

- Born: Yin Carl Paradies
- Education: Northern Territory University; University of Newcastle; University of California, Berkeley; University of Melbourne
- Known for: Race relations; Race and health
- Awards: NAIDOC Scholar of the Year Award (2007)
- Scientific career
- Fields: Public health
- Institutions: Deakin University
- Thesis: Race, racism, stress and Indigenous health (2006)

Yin C. Paradies FAHA FASSA is Alfred Deakin Professor and Chair in Race Relations at Deakin University. He is a Wakaya (Aboriginal) man known for his research on the health and societal effects of racism, as well as his work on applying anti-racism principles in a wide variety of settings. He also teaches and undertakes research in Indigenous knowledges and decolonisation. In 2007, he received the NAIDOC Scholar of the Year Award. Paradies was named one of 40 lifetime superstars of Australian research in 2021, the leading Australian researcher in the field of ethnic and cultural studies in 2023 and one of the top 40 Aboriginal and Torres Strait Islander STEM leaders in 2024. Paradies was elected Fellow of the Academy of the Social Sciences in Australia in November 2021 and of the Australian Academy of the Humanities in 2024.
