= Chern'ee Sutton =

Australian artist

- Born: 1996 (age 29–30)
- Known for: Painting
- Website: www.cherneesutton.com.au

Chern'ee Sutton (born 1996) is a contemporary Australian artist known for her colourful 3D painting style.

== Background ==
Chern'ee comes from the Kalkadoon people of the Mount Isa area in Queensland, Australia. She takes her inspiration from the tales of her people and embraces themes of reconciliation, inclusion, sports and charity. Her style of painting incorporates traditional indigenous motifs, presented in a fresh and harmonious manner.

== Career ==
=== Beginning ===
Chern'ee began painting in 2010 as a 13-year-old high school student and usually uses acrylic paints on canvas. She was encouraged by her teacher to enter the Yoorellgoo Indigenous art competition despite no previous experience. “I didn’t expect anything to come out of it. But I came first! And that’s what sparked my passion for art,” she said.

=== Recognition ===
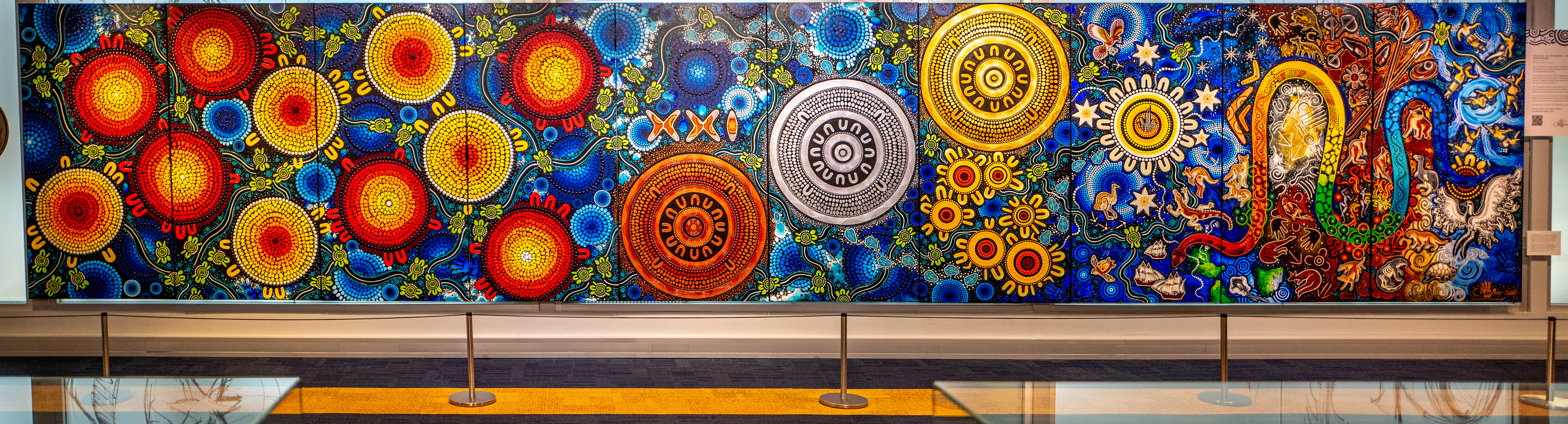
Painting "Caina Putut, IIya, Wartanganha" (lit. "Yesterday, Today, Tomorrow") by Chern'ee Sutton on display in the Royal Australian Mint Canberra

Her subsequent paintings proved popular, and soon her art was fetching prices of thousands of dollars at charity auctions. In 2013 Sutton produced four paintings for Tennis Australia and received a scholarship to continue her art education. In 2014 she was awarded the NAIDOC National Youth of the Year Award for her art work. She has worked with a number of Queensland government departments and her paintings are now on display in government and public locations including Parliament House, Brisbane and the State Library of Queensland. She also has paintings in the Royal Collection at Buckingham Palace, London.

=== 2018 Commonwealth Games ===
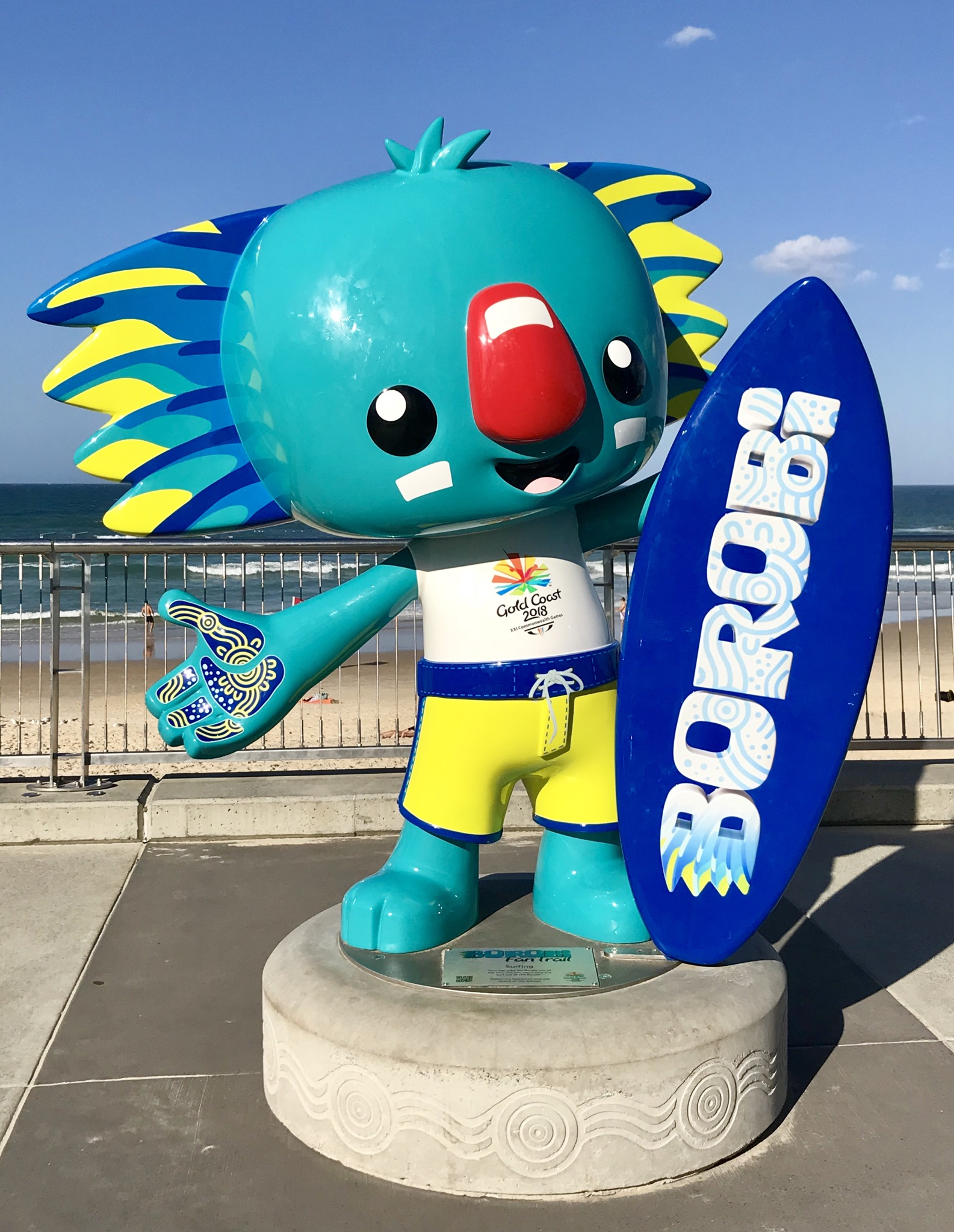
The patterns on the paws of Borobi were designed by Sutton

Chern'ee designed the artwork adorning the paws of Borobi, the mascot for the 2018 Commonwealth Games held on the Gold Coast. She also created a 14-metre long painting entitled Journey to Gold welcoming athletes to the Village. Adorned with the fingerprints of 20 000 volunteers and dignitaries, this painting depicts the east coast of Australia down to the Gold Coast and is filled with imagery linking the destination to the 70 Commonwealth nations competing in the games.

Another artwork, entitled Caina Putut, IIya, Wartanganha - Long ago, Today, Tomorrow - was painted during her residency at the Games Village, and depicts the human story of Australia, following a rainbow serpent from the Dreamtime, winding past people, gatherings and animals, to the Gold Coast, the eleven days of the Games, and the bronze, silver, and gold medal winners, with athletes and dignitaries contributing a thumbprint in the appropriate locations in recognition of the unique indigenous "dot-painting" technique. It is currently on display at the Royal Australian Mint in Canberra, where the Games medals pictured on the 9-metre long artwork were struck.

=== 2023 FIFA Women's World Cup ===
Chern'ee, along with New Zealand artist Fiona Collis, was chosen to produce artwork for the 2023 Women's World Cup, jointly hosted by Australia and New Zealand.
