= Diana Mudgee =

Aboriginal woman from Mudgee, New South Wales

Diana Mudgee (c. 1820s - 4 May 1902) was a Wiradjuri Aboriginal Australian woman from Mudgee, New South Wales who raised ten children and gained ownership of over 500 acres of land, which according to the Australian Institute of Aboriginal and Torres Strait Islander Studies was an unusual achievement for a woman at that time.

== Life ==
Born in the 1820s, Mudgee lost her family at a young age in a colonial massacre south of Mudgee during the period where martial law was declared in Bathurst and the surrounding areas of Wiradjuri country. After this, she was sent to as an orphan to work on the Cox family properties, whose former superintendent, Theophilus Chamberlain, instigated many of the punitive expeditions against the local Aboriginal people including the massacre of Mudgee's family. At one of the Cox properties she was given the name Diana Mudgee as part of her working as a servant; she had a Wiradjuri name, Emanjili, that her employers refused to acknowledge.

In her early teens, Mudgee had a daughter with James Knight, who distanced himself from Mudgee after her birth. In 1840, she married convict William Phillips and had two daughters with him before he disappeared in 1845. Between 1847 and 1861, Mudgee and convict Robert Rayner have seven children together. Rayner died in 1874.

In 1885, Mudgee was granted a conditional purchase of 160 ha (400 acres) of land in Piambong, with George Henry Cox listed as guarantor, and additional lots of land were acquired by in 1892. According to the Australian Institute of Aboriginal and Torres Strait Islander Studies the circumstances by which Mudgee came into possession of such a considerable amount of land is not known. It could have been that Cox used Mudgee as a "dummy bidder", a practice where colonists would purchase land in the names of their wives, children or servants as a security.

Mudgee died on 4 May 1902 in Piambong at the estimated age of 76.
