= Alick Tipoti =

Torres Strait Islander artist and activist

Alick Tipoti (born 1975), whose traditional name is Zugub, is a Torres Strait Islander artist, linguist, and activist of the Kala Lagaw Ya people, from Badu Island, in the Zenadh Kes (Torres Strait). His work includes painting, installations, printmaking, sculpture and mask-making, and is focused on preserving the culture and languages of his people.

== Early life and education ==
Tipoti was born in 1975 on Thursday Island and grew up on Badu Island (aka Mulgrave Island); he also has connections with Mabuiag Island. His father, Leniaso, was an artist and cultural adviser, and Alick developed an interest in art as a child. He was given the traditional name of Zugub in order to link him to the spirits of his ancestors, the Zugubal.

He went to primary school on Badu Island, before moving to Thursday Island, gaining an Advance Diploma in Arts at the TAFE college there in 1992 and later graduated with a Bachelor of Visual Arts (Printmaking) at the Australia National University in Canberra in 1998. (Note: Design and Art Australia Online source says 1994, but this seems less likely for a BA.)

== Career ==
Tipoti's artistic practice was initially focused on printmaking, using linocuts. He began exhibiting in small galleries in North Queensland in the early 1990s.

In 2007 he started to make artistic versions of ceremonial masks out of fibreglass, inspired by the traditional turtleshell masks.

He was commissioned to design an artwork for the floor of the Cairns Airport domestic arrivals hall as well as other buildings, and nine railway carriages of the Tilt Train from Brisbane to Cairns in 2010.

In 2015 he performed the Marimawa (spiritual mask dance) at the British Museum in London.

Tipoti has also been a mentor and leader to younger artists in the Torres Strait Islands.

== Current practice ==
Tipoti's work includes printmaking, sculpture, painting, dance and performance art. His subjects include legendary heroes and his creations include weapons, dhari (the Torres Strait Islander traditional headdress, as featured on the flag), masks, and drums.

His work reflects the culture of his people, the Maluyligal (Maluilgal) of the Torres Strait, with a strong focus on representing his language. His works sometimes have a strong narrative element, sometimes comprising more than one image, and he pays attention to minute details. He aims to document aspects of his culture, including stories, genealogies, and songs, so that future generations can learn from his work, and, as one of the last generations to speak Kala Lagaw Ya (of the Maluilgal nation) fluently, he is involved in programs that help to preserve the language. He also speaks Kala Kawa Ya (of the Guda Maluyligal nation).

He teaches language, culture and history at Tagai State College and Thursday Island TAFE.

He lives and works mostly in Cairns.

== Activism ==
Tipoti has been active in informing the public about the dangers of the climate change crisis in the Torres Strait, as well as plastic pollution in the ocean. His exhibit for the Taba Naba - Australia, Oceania, Arts of the Sea People which began at the Oceanographic Museum of Monaco in 2016 brought him into contact with Prince Albert II of Monaco, a keen environmentalist. The prince subsequently visited the Torres Strait and stayed with Tipoti and his family.

In 2021, the full-length documentary film Alick and Albert, by Brisbane film producer Trish Lake and co-written by Tipoti, was released. It includes stories of the Badulgal people of Badu Island as well as the Monégasque people of Monaco, who are concerned about climate change and the future of the oceans. Most of the filming was able to be done before the COVID-19 pandemic of 2020–21 restricted people's movements. The film had its world premiere at the Brisbane International Film Festival in October 2021.

== Recognition and awards ==
Tipoti has been honoured with a number of awards, starting when he was a student and in his early career. He was named as Townsville Pimlico TAFE College's Art Student of the Year in 1993, and Australian Capital Territory Scholar of the Year after his studies at ANU in 1997. In 1998 he won the Lin Onus Youth Prize in the 4th edition of the National Indigenous Heritage Art Award.

Other awards include:

- NAIDOC Awards:
  - 1999: Torres Strait Senior Cultural Award
  - 2009: Torres Strait Senior Cultural Award
  - 2012: Torres Strait Artist of the Year
  - 2024: Caring for Country and Culture Award
- National Aboriginal & Torres Strait Islander Art Award (NATSIAA)
  - 2003: 20th edition, Works on Paper
  - 2007: 24th edition, Works on Paper
  - 2008: 25th edition, People's Choice Award
  - 2014: 31st edition, 3D Category, Museum and Art Gallery of the Northern Territory, Darwin
- 2001: Fremantle Print Award, Non-Acquisitive Prize
- 2008: Fremantle Print Award, Non-Acquisitive Prize
- 2011: ACCELERATE Indigenous Leadership Award, awarded by the British Council and Australia Council
- 2012: Deadly Awards, Visual Artist of the Year Finalist
- 2021: Australians Screen Industry Network Awards, Best Documentary, for Alick and Albert
- 2021: 19th International Oceanian Documentary Film Festival (FIFO), Special Jury Prize, for Alick and Albert

== Exhibitions ==
His work has been included in many group exhibitions, including:

- 2012: UnDisclosed: 2nd National Indigenous Art Triennial at the National Gallery of Australia
- 2012: 18th Biennale of Sydney
- 2016–2017: Taba Naba - Australia, Oceania, Arts of the Sea People, exhibiting the largest artwork ever made by a Torres Strait Islander on the roof of the Oceanographic Museum of Monaco, in 2017 travelling to Switzerland, and on to the Ocean Conference at the United Nations in New York City
- 2021: The National

His solo exhibitions include:

- 2007–2009: Malangu – From the Sea: several galleries around the country, and at Arts d’Australie in Paris, France
- 2011: Mawa Adhaz Pa’ar – Sorcerer Masks, Australian Art Network Galleries at Canopy Artspace, Cairns
- 2012: Badhulayg – Person of Badu, Gallery Gabrielle Pizzi, Melbourne
- 2015: Alick Tipoti Zugubal: Ancestral Spirits, Cairns Regional Gallery, Cairns
- 2016: Lagangu, Linden New Art, Melbourne VIC
- 2020–2022: Mariw Minaral (Spititual Patterns), Australian National Maritime Museum, Sydney

== Collections ==
His work is held in many collections in Australia and in other countries, including:

- Art Gallery of Western Australia, Perth
- Arts Centre Melbourne
- Australian Museum, Sydney
- British Museum, London
- Cairns Regional Gallery, Cairns
- Cambridge University Museum, UK
- Canberra School of Arts, Australian National University
- Gold Coast City Art Gallery, Surfers Paradise
- Griffith University, Brisbane
- University of Melbourne, Melbourne
- Tjibaou Cultural Centre, Noumea, New Caledonia
- Kluge-Ruhe Aboriginal Art Collection, University of Virginia, US
- Musée des Confluences, Lyon, France
- Museum and Art Gallery of the Northern Territory, Darwin
- Museum of Contemporary Art Australia, Sydney
- National Gallery of Australia, Canberra
- National Gallery of Victoria, Melbourne
- National Museum of Australia, Canberra
- Queensland Art Gallery, Brisbane
- Queensland University of Technology, Brisbane
- Torres Strait Regional Authority, Thursday Island
- Parliament House, Canberra
- Parliament House, Wellington, New Zealand

== Films ==
- Zugub, the mask, the spirits and the stars (2012)
- Alick and Albert (2021) Apart from wins at ASINA and FIFO, Alick and Albert was nominated for six awards at the 2021 Queensland Film Network Awards
