= National Indigenous Times =

Indigenous Australian affairs website

The National Indigenous Times (NIT) is an Indigenous Australian affairs website, originally published as a newspaper from February 2002.

== History ==
National Indigenous Times was first published in newspaper form on 27 February 2002. It was established by Owen Carriage, the founder of the Koori Mail.

In 2006, NIT published a major story about government staff anonymously representing themselves as independent witnesses in the Lateline report on child abuse in remote communities, with particular reference to Mutitjulu, in the Northern Territory.

On 27 February 2012, the Australian Broadcasting Corporation's program Media Watch aired a segment that detailed how the newspaper had repeatedly taken substantial material from other media sources without any attribution. This was addressed by editor Stephen Hagan, who promised to deliver more original material and use citations when using external references. Hagan left in December 2013.

In January and February 2015, the NIT was placed in administration because of accumulating legal bills arising from a defamation case and an unfair dismissal claim by former editor Stephen Hagan. NIT survived administration with a mix of the longstanding owners/founders and a number new part owners.

Gerry Georgatos was an investigative reporter and feature writer with the NIT for around six years. He delivered stories on native title in Australia, corrupt practices and government neglect of poverty-stricken communities. His correspondence for NIT was as a volunteer, "bringing to the fore voices from his many travels". Just before he announced in February 2015 that he was no longer with the newspaper, he spoke positively of the newspaper on National Indigenous Television.

In December 2015, Tony Barrass bought the NIT masthead from Sydney liquidators O'Brien Palmer and launched the online version on 28 February 2016.

In July 2024, NIT launched the website The Indigenous Business Review. In addition to their website, a glossy paper magazine is distributed as bimonthly inserts into The Australian and The West Australian newspapers, and is available in Qantas airport lounges.

== Governance and description ==
Since late February 2016, it has functioned as an online publication owned by Indigenous businessman and former Kimberley Land Council CEO Wayne Bergmann and Indigenous businessman Clinton Wolf. It was formerly owned and edited by Tony Barrass. As of November 2022, the editor is Giovanni Torre.

== Awards ==
- 2004: Walkley Award, for a story on stolen wages
- 2012: At the inaugural Multicultural Media Awards at NSW Parliament in September 2012, Gerry Georgatos received two awards: Coverage of Indigenous Affairs and Investigative Reporting, and Feature Writing.
- 2013: At the 2013 Multicultural Media Awards, Georgatos won three awards, including Journalist of the Year for his coverage on the extent of suicide among Aboriginal Australians and Torres Strait Islanders.

== See also ==
- Koori Bina, a 1970s monthly published by Black Women's Action
- Koori Mail
