= Grave of Yuranigh =

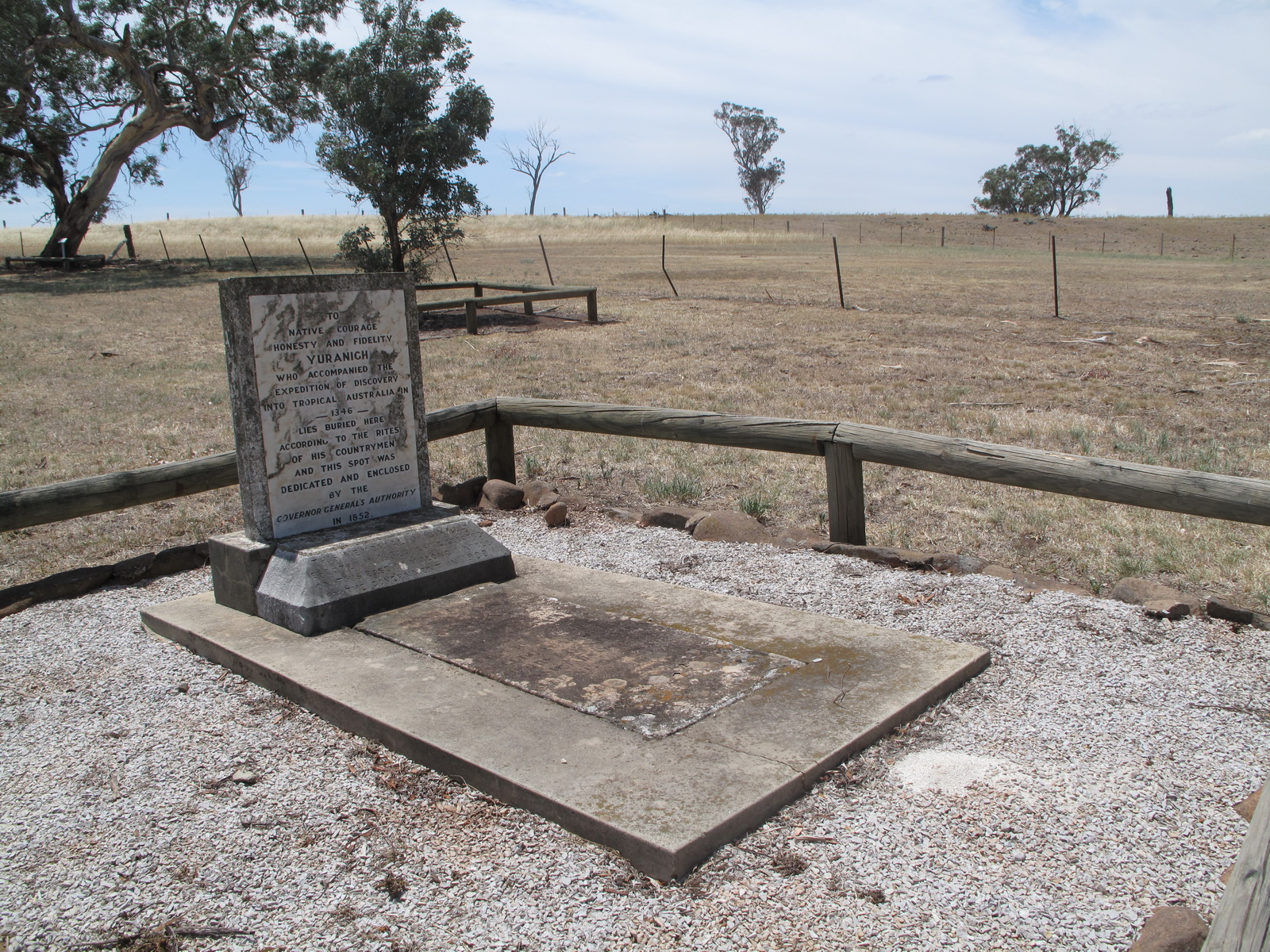
- Yuranigh's gravesite, 2013

- Location within New South Wales Location within Australia
- 33.1220°S 148.8827°E
- Location: 3km SE of Molong Yuranigh Road, Molong, Cabonne Shire, New South Wales, Australia

History
- Built: 1852–1852

New South Wales Heritage Register
- Official name: Grave of Yuranigh; Yuranigh's grave
- Type: state heritage (archaeological-terrestrial)
- Designated: 10 March 2006
- Reference no.: 1713
- Type: Burial
- Category: Aboriginal

Grave of Yuranigh is the heritage-listed grave of Yuranigh, a 19th-century Wiradjuri man. It is located 3 km south-east of Molong, in the Central West region of New South Wales, Australia and dates from 1852. It is also known as Yuranigh's grave. It was added to the New South Wales State Heritage Register on 10 March 2006.

== History ==
Yuranigh, originally from Boree, accompanied the Surveyor General of NSW, Thomas Mitchell on his fourth and final journey to the north-west of Australia. This venture finished approximately 161 km west of Mackay in Queensland. A party of 29 white men and three Aboriginal people, one of whom was Yuranigh, departed from Boree on this journey on 15 December 1845, with equipment consisting of eight drays, 80 bullocks, two boats, three light carts, and enough provisions for a year. As the party progressed Yuranigh became increasingly helpful to Mitchell for which Mitchell was extremely appreciative. Yuranigh's main contribution lay in his ability to negotiate with other Aboriginal people, through whose territory they passed, and in his extensive bush lore and knowledge of country, with which he advised Mitchell. In his journal Mitchell described Yuranigh as his "guide, companion, counsellor and friend".

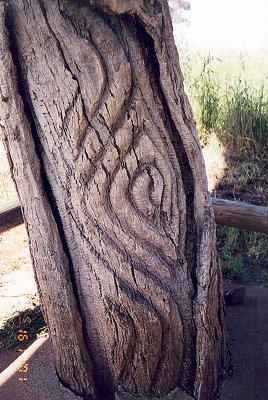
Carving on a tree

On the completion of the exploratory journey Yuranigh accompanied Mitchell to Mitchell's Sydney home, but not liking the city, Yuranigh soon left to become a stockman on a northern cattle station.

On 13 July 1850 Mitchell learnt of the death of Yuranigh at the old Gamboola Station, near Molong. According to their custom, Aboriginal people buried Yuranigh there, marking his grave with four carved trees. According to early settlers, it was common practice for Aboriginal people to carve the trees around the grave of an Aboriginal of distinction or repute. All the carvings were cut to face Yuranigh's grave. Of the four trees, only on one, which is now dead, can the carvings be clearly seen. The carvings on the other trees must almost have been covered by regrowth. The distinguishable carving is an ovate spiral surrounded by a triple extended S-pattern on one side.

The grave of Yuranigh has been marked with signs of respect by both Aboriginal people and Europeans. The grave has around its perimeter four carved trees, a sign by Aboriginal's that the buried person was worthy of special credit. A fence and a memorial stone in the European tradition was also erected.

== Description ==
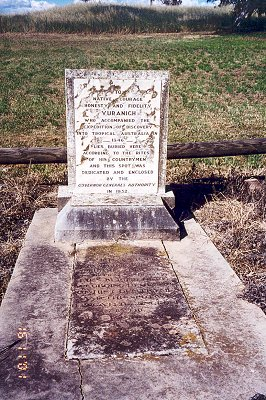
Headstone

The grave is marked by a headstone, which pays tribute to Yuranigh's courage, honesty and fidelity. Marking the corners of the burial ground are four carved trees which like the grave, have been fenced for their protection. One of the trees is dead, and the carving on it very distinct. The other trees are alive and the carvings obscured to varying degrees as a result of regrowth. Yuranigh was one of Thomas Mitchell's guides, who died between 1847 and 1852. The grave apparently had five trees in 1854. In 1852 New South Wales Government paid for memorial headstone for the grave which is still here. Best preserved burial site in region. The grave consists of a marble headstone with an inscription. Grave itself is set in a concrete slab with a sandstone slab in the concrete. Sandstone slab has another inscription. Grave faces south-west and is surrounded by a white wooden fence with chicken wire netting. Dimensions of fence; 3.2m x 3.6m

== Heritage listing ==
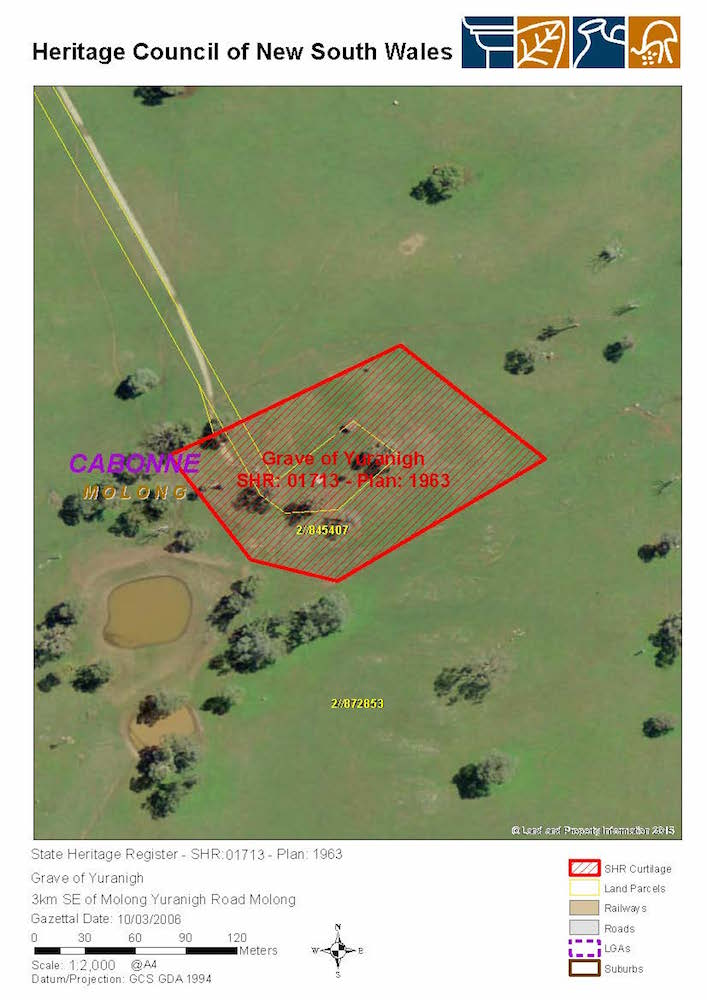
Heritage boundaries

Yuranigh's grave is an excellent example of "culture contact". The presence of carved trees around the grave demonstrates commemoration by Aboriginal people. While the inscribed headstone indicates the "honour" bestowed on Yuranigh by Major Mitchell, to whom he acted as a guide on his famous last north west exploratory adventure. The carved trees are also, as far as is known, the longest remaining number of carved trees around a grave.

Grave of Yuranigh was listed on the New South Wales State Heritage Register on 10 March 2006 having satisfied the following criteria.

The place is important in demonstrating the course, or pattern, of cultural or natural history in New South Wales.

Yuranigh's Grave is of state significance for its associations with the exploration of inland Australia, and particularly for its ability to evidence significant, positive contacts between Aboriginal and non Aboriginal people during the colonial period.

The place has a strong or special association with a person, or group of persons, of importance of cultural or natural history of New South Wales's history.

Yuranigh's Grave is of state significance for its associations with the significant person surveyor Major Thomas Mitchell and guide Yuranigh, as well as associations with the Wiradjuri people of the Central West of NSW.

The place is important in demonstrating aesthetic characteristics and/or a high degree of creative or technical achievement in New South Wales.

Yuranigh's Grave has landmark qualities within a rural landscape by its arrangement of carved trees around a marked grave, making it aesthetically distinctive in both its local context and within the context of known contact-era graves of Aboriginal people.

The place has strong or special association with a particular community or cultural group in New South Wales for social, cultural or spiritual reasons.

Yuranigh's Grave is significance for the sense of community and place it affirms in the Wiradjuri communities of the Molong area and the Central West region.

The place has potential to yield information that will contribute to an understanding of the cultural or natural history of New South Wales.

Yuranigh's Grave is of state significance as an important reference site for burial of Aboriginal people that have been honoured and commemorated by both Aboriginal and non Aboriginal communities for nearly 150 years, and because it provides evidence of bi-cultural (Wiradjuri and English) attitudes to death and remembrance that are relatively rare in NSW.

The place possesses uncommon, rare or endangered aspects of the cultural or natural history of New South Wales.

Yuranigh's Grave is rare and is state significance for its evidence of the now defunct custom of carving living trees adjacent to grave sites, as the only known example of a grave exhibiting Aboriginal and European burial markers known in NSW, for its ability to demonstrate designs and techniques in tree carving, and for its ability to show rare evidence of the activity of marking graves and remembering persons important in Wiradjuri and non Aboriginal communities.

The place is important in demonstrating the principal characteristics of a class of cultural or natural places/environments in New South Wales.

Yuranigh's Grave is of state significance as a fine example (the only known example) of its type as a grave demonstrating bi-cultural respect for an important man, and for its attributes evidencing a way of life and the customs of both the Wiradjuri people of the Central West and of the settlers in the colonial period.
