= Jessa Rogers =

Aboriginal Australian teacher and scholar (born 1985)

Jessa Rogers (née Smith born 7 April 1985) is an Aboriginal Australian education leader and Fulbright Scholar currently based between Melbourne and Queensland.

== Early life and education ==
Rogers is a member of the Wiradjuri people and was born in Canberra, Australia. Her family moved to Sunshine Coast, Queensland, where Rogers attended local schools before going on to complete degrees at Queensland University of Technology, University of Southern Queensland, and Australian National University.

== Career ==
Rogers is an Indigenous scholar and teacher who is recognised as an advocate for education reform in Australia. Rogers argues for the need for schools to be more inclusive of Indigenous cultures in their curriculum, and the need for more Indigenous teachers in Australian schools.

In 2015, Rogers was appointed the inaugural Principal of the Cape York Girl Academy, Australia's first boarding school for young mothers and their babies. Rogers' passion for supporting the education of teenage mothers is based on her own experience as a Year 12 student who fell pregnant and gave birth to a son ten days before graduating from secondary school. She has a PhD in Indigenous Education from the Australian National University.

Rogers is currently Associate Dean (Indigenous) in the Faculty of Education at the University of Melbourne and an affiliated First Nations Senior Research Fellow at Queensland University of Technology. She is also managing director of Baayi Consulting and has previously held academic appointments at a number of universities including the University of Canberra, Macquarie University, the University of the Sunshine Coast, and Australian National University. From 2018-2024 she was a member of the Nursing and Midwifery Board of Australia and the Aboriginal and Torres Strait Islander Health Strategy Group. She has been a member of the Australian Aboriginal Studies Journal editorial board since 2020.

In 2023, Rogers was appointed to the board of the Australian Children’s Education & Care Quality Authority, and in 2024 she was appointed by the Australian Government to serve on the Regional Telecommunications Review Panel.

== Awards ==
Rogers was the NAIDOC Young Person of the Year in 2010, and won the Reconciliation Award at the Australian National University in 2014, and the Minoru Hokari Scholarship in 2015. She was a finalist for ACT Young Woman of the Year in 2016, and won the 2016 Queensland University of Technology Young Alumnus of the Year Award. In 2017, Rogers was as a Fulbright Scholar based in the Native American Program at Harvard University and in 2018 was appointed a Churchill Fellow.
