= Wiradjuri =

Aboriginal Australian people

Hierarchy
- Language family: Pama–Nyungan
- Language group: Wiradhuric
- Group dialects: Wiradjuri

Area (approx. 97,100 square kilometres (37,500 mi^{2}))
- Bioregion: Central New South Wales
- Location: Central New South Wales
- Coordinates: 33°50′S 147°30′E
- Rivers: Galari (Lachlan), Wambuul Macquarie, Marrambidya (Murrumbidgee), Milawa (Murray)

Notable individuals
- Windradyne, Linda Burney, Tai Tuivasa

The Wiradjuri people (Wiradjuri northern dialect pronunciation [wiraːjd̪uːraj]; Wiradjuri southern dialect pronunciation [wiraːjɟuːraj]) are a group of Aboriginal Australian people from central New South Wales, united by common descent through kinship and shared traditions. They survived as skilled hunter-fisher-gatherers, in family groups or clans, and many still use knowledge of hunting and gathering techniques as part of their customary life.

In the 21st century, major Wiradjuri groups live in Condobolin, Peak Hill, Narrandera and Griffith. There are significant populations at Wagga Wagga and Leeton and smaller groups at West Wyalong, Parkes, Dubbo, Forbes, Cootamundra, Darlington Point, Cowra and Young.

== Etymology ==
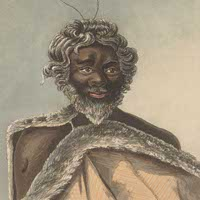
A Wiradjuri warrior, thought to be Windradyne

=== Autonym or colonisers' exonym ===
Some colonial writers claim that the Wiradjuri is an autonym derived from wiray, meaning "no" or "not", with the comitative suffix -dhuray or -dyuray meaning "having". That the Wiradjuri said wiray, as opposed to some other word for "no", was seen as a distinctive feature of their speech, and several other tribes in New South Wales, to the west of the Great Dividing Range, are similarly named after their own words for "no". A similar distinction was made between Romance languages in medieval France, with the langues d'oc and the langues d'oïl distinguished by their word for "yes".

=== Debate about the name Wiradjuri ===
In his book Aboriginal Tribes of Australia (1974), Norman Tindale wrote that Wiradjuri was one of several terms coined later, after the 1890s had seen a "rash of such terms", following the publication of a work by ethnologist John Fraser. In 1892, Fraser had published a revised and expanded edition of Lancelot Threlkeld's 1834 work on the Awabakal language, An Australian Grammar, in which he created his own names for groupings, such as Yunggai, Wachigari and Yakkajari.

Tindale says that some of the later terms had entered the literature, although not based on fieldwork and lacking Aboriginal support, as artificial, collective names for his "Great Tribes" of New South Wales. He writes that there was such a "literary need for major groupings that [Fraser] set out to provide them for New South Wales, coining entirely artificial terms for his 'Great tribes'. These were not based on field research and lacked aboriginal support. His names such as Yunggai, Wachigari and Yakkajari can be ignored as artifacts...During the 1890s the idea spread and soon there was a rash of such terms...Some of these have entered, unfortunately, into popular literature, despite their dubious origins." In Tindale's own work he accepts the term Wiradjuri as denoting an aggregate reality as "one of the largest tribal groupings in Australia, with many hordes".

=== Alternative names ===
The variety of spellings for the name Wiradjuri is extensive, with over 60 ways of transcribing the word registered.

== History ==
=== British settlement ===
Wiradjuri territory was first reached by British colonists in 1813. In 1822 George Suttor took up an extensive lot of land, later known as Brucedale Station, after Wiradjuri guides showed him an area with ample water sources. Suttor learnt their language, and befriended Windradyne, nicknamed "Saturday", and attributed conflict to the harshness of his fellow settlers' behaviour, since the Wiradjuri were in his view, fond of white people, as they would call them.

=== Frontier conflict ===
Clashes between the British settlers and the Wiradjuri, however, multiplied as the influx of colonists increased, and became known as the Bathurst Wars. The occupation of their lands and their cultivation caused famine among the Wiradjuri, who had a different notion of property. (Note: Suttor wrote: "These natives have some imperfect ideas of property, and the right of possession. They say all wild animals are theirs – the tame or cultivated ones are ours. Whatever springs spontaneously from the earth or without labour is theirs also. Things produced by art and labour, are the white fellows' as they call us." (Langton 2010, p. 37)) In the 1850s there were still corroborees around Mudgee, but there were fewer clashes.

=== Sites of significance ===
- Koonadan Historic Site, located 9 km north-west of Leeton
- The Wellington Convict and Mission Site in Wellington, a former convict settlement and Aboriginal mission
- 56 historical sites found during survey work at Yathong Nature Reserve, including scar trees, camp sites and cave art
- A historical site, consisting of an open campsite, found during survey work at Nombinnie Nature Reserve
- Mungabareena Reserve, a meeting place at Albury

== Geography: Wiradjuri country ==
The Wiradjuri are the largest Aboriginal group in New South Wales. They once occupied a vast area in central New South Wales, on the plains running north and south to the west of the Blue Mountains. The area was known as "the land of the three rivers", the Wambuul (Macquarie), the Kalare later known as the Lachlan and the Murrumbidgee, or Murrumbidjeri.

Norman Tindale estimated the territorial range of the Wiradjuri tribal lands at 127,000 km^{2} (49,000 sq mi). Their eastern borders ran from north to south from above Mudgee, down to the foothills of the Blue Mountains east of Lithgow and Oberon, and east of Cowra, Young and Tumut and south to the upper Murray at Albury and east to about Tumbarumba. The southern border ran to Howlong. Its western reaches went along Billabong Creek to beyond Mossgiel. They extended southwest to the vicinity of Hay and Narrandera. Condobolin southwards to Booligal, Carrathool, Wagga Wagga, Cootamundra, Parkes, Trundle; Gundagai, Boorowa, and Rylstone, Wellington, and Carcoar all lay within Wiradjuri territory.

The Murray River forms the Wiradjuri's southern boundary and the change from woodland to open grassland marks their eastern boundary.

== Culture ==
=== Wiradjuri language ===
Wiradjuri is a Pama–Nyungan family and classified as a member of the small Wiradhuric branch of Australian languages of Central New South Wales.

The Wiradjuri language is effectively extinct, but attempts are underway to revive it, with a reconstructed grammar, based on earlier ethnographic materials and wordlists and the memories of Wiradjuri families, which is now used to teach the language in schools. This reclamation work was originally propelled by elder Stan Grant and John Rudder who had previously studied Australian Aboriginal languages in Arnhem Land.

Some words

- guwandhaang 'native peach'. The English word for this in Australia, quandong, is thought to derive from the Wirandjuri term.
- wagga 'crow'. The Wiradjeri term perhaps lies behind the toponym for the town of Wagga Wagga. The reduplication may be a pluralizer suggesting the idea of "(place of) many crows". This has recently been questioned by Wiradjuri elder Stan Grant Sr and Tim Wess, an academic. The word behind the toponym is, they claim, waga, meaning "dance", and the reduplicative would mean "many dances/much dancing".

=== Social organisation ===
The Wiradjuri were organised into bands. Norman Tindale quotes Alfred William Howitt as mentioning several of these local groups of the tribe:

- Narrandera (prickly lizard)
- Cootamundra (kuta-mundra, kutamun turtle)
- Murranbulla (maring-bula, two bark canoes)

=== Burial rite ===
The Wiradjuri, together with the Gamilaraay (who however used them in bora ceremonies), were particularly known for their use of carved trees which functioned as taphoglyphs, marking the burial site of a notable medicine-man, ceremonial leader, warrior or orator of a tribe. On the death of a distinguished Wiradjuri, initiated men would strip the bark off a tree to allow them to incise symbols on the side of the trunk which faced the burial mound. The craftsmanship on remaining examples of this funeral artwork displays notable artistic power. Four still stand near Molong at the Grave of Yuranigh.

They are generally to be found near rivers where the softer earth allowed easier burial. Alfred William Howitt remarked that these trees incised with taphoglyphs served both as transit points to allow mythological cultural heroes to ascend to, and descend from, the firmament as well as a means for the deceased to return to the sky.

=== Diet ===
The Wiradjuri diet included yabbies and fish such as Murray cod from the rivers. In dry seasons, they ate kangaroos, emus and food gathered from the land, including fruit, nuts, yam daisies (Microseris lanceolata), wattle seeds, and orchid tubers. The Wiradjuri travelled into Alpine areas in the summer to feast on bogong moths.

=== Attire ===
The Wiradjuri were also known for their handsome possum-skin cloaks stitched together from several possum furs. Governor Macquarie was presented with one of these cloaks by a Wiradjuri man when he visited Bathurst in 1815.

== Notable people ==
=== Historical ===
- Diana Mudgee, massacre survivor and early Aboriginal land owner
- Kitty Hanley (c1845 - 1917) matriarch and midwife
- Turandurey, explorer, guide and interpreter
- William Punch, massacre survivor and World War One serviceman
- Windradyne, important Aboriginal leader during the Bathurst War
- Yuranigh, a much prized guide for the explorer Thomas Mitchell, especially during his expedition to the Gulf of Carpentaria in 1845–1846. On hearing of Yuranigh's death in 1852, Mitchell put up £200 to have his gravesite marked with a tombstone.

=== Modern ===
- Kirsten Banks, astronomer
- Tony Briggs, actor, writer and producer
- Linda Burney, member of the Australian House of Representatives
- Evonne Goolagong Cawley, tennis player
- Jimmy Clements, present at the opening of Provisional Parliament House in 1927
- Bill Ferguson – activist, leader, organiser of 1938 Day of Mourning protest
- Isobelle Mary Ferguson, nurse and activist, daughter of Bill
- Kevin Gilbert, 20th century author
- Stan Grant, journalist, son of Stan Grant Sr
- Stan Grant Sr, a Wiradjuri elder and linguist
- Anita Heiss, contemporary novelist
- Kate Howarth, author
- Faye McMillan, academic
- Kerry Reed-Gilbert, poet, author and elder
- Isabel Reid (born 1932), elder and advocate for the Stolen Generation; NSW State Recipient of Senior Australian of the Year 2021; oldest living survivor of those forcibly removed under the Aborigines Protection Act 1909 (NSW)
- Jessa Rogers, founding principal of the Cape York Girl Academy
- Mum (Shirl) Smith, community activist
- Margaret Tucker, co-founder of the Australian Aborigines League
- Joyce Williams, Wiradjuri elder, health campaigner, native title activist
- Neville "Uncle Chappy" Williams, land activist and proponent in the Lake Cowal Campaign
- Tara June Winch, author
- Jack Charles (1943–2022), actor, elder, activist
- Jeanine Leane, poet and academic

=== Music/the arts ===
- Brook Andrew, contemporary artist
- Bianca Beetson, contemporary artist
- Luke Carroll, actor, presenter
- Alan Dargin, didgeridoo player
- Ella Havelka, dancer, first Indigenous person to join The Australian Ballet
- Melanie Horsnell, singer-songwriter
- Mo'Ju, musician
- Lin Onus, artist
- Harry Wedge, artist
- YNG Martyr, rapper/singer-songwriter

=== Sporting ===
==== Rugby league ====
- Josh Addo-Carr, rugby league footballer
- Braidon Burns, rugby league footballer
- Laurie Daley, rugby league footballer
- Scott Drinkwater, rugby league footballer
- Adam Elliott, rugby league footballer
- Blake Ferguson, rugby league footballer
- Jai Field, rugby league footballer
- Andrew Fifita, rugby league footballer
- Tyrell Fuimaono, rugby league footballer
- David Grant, rugby league footballer
- Nicho Hynes, rugby league footballer
- Cliff Lyons, rugby league footballer
- Latrell Mitchell, rugby league footballer
- Brent Naden, rugby league footballer
- David Peachey, rugby league footballer
- Tyrone Peachey, rugby league footballer
- Jesse Ramien, rugby league footballer
- Will Robinson, rugby league footballer
- Ron Saddler, rugby league footballer
- Reimis Smith, rugby league footballer
- Kotoni Staggs, rugby league footballer
- Brad Tighe, rugby league footballer
- Willie Tonga, rugby league footballer
- Jack Wighton, rugby league footballer

=== Australian rules football ===
- Aidyn Johnson, Australian rules footballer
- Zac Williams, Australian rules footballer

==== Other sports ====
- Wally Carr, Australian Commonwealth Boxing Champion
- Daniel Christian, member of the Australian cricket team
- Brendon Cook, first Indigenous international race car driver
- Evonne Goolagong, champion tennis player
- John Kinsela, first Aboriginal Olympic wrestler
- Dylan Pietsch, rugby union player for the NSW Waratahs
- Tai Tuivasa, mixed martial arts and Ultimate Fighting Championship fighter
- Mariah Williams Australian Olympic hockey player

== In popular culture ==
The short story Death in the Dawntime, originally published in The Mammoth Book of Historical Detectives (Mike Ashley, editor; 1995), is a murder mystery that takes place entirely among the Wiradjuri people before the arrival of Europeans in Australia.

In Bryce Courtenay's novel Jessica, the plot is centred in Wiradjuri region. Jessica's best friend (Mary Simpson) was from Wiradjuri.

Noel Beddoe's novel The Yalda Crossing also explores Wiradjuri history from an early settler perspective, bringing to life a little-known massacre that occurred in the 1830s.

Andy Kissane's poem, "The Station Owner's Daughter, Narrandera" tells a story about the aftermath of that same massacre, and was the inspiration for Alex Ryan's short film, Ngurrumbang.

Anita Heiss's historical novel, Bila Yarrudhanggalangdhuray, set in 1852 around the time of the devastating Gundagai flood, follows the life of a young Wiradjuri woman named Wagadhaany.

== Sources ==
- "Addo-Carr on track for NRL debut". National Rugby League. 19 February 2016.
- Almond, Ali (3 September 2022). "UFC 209: Tai Tuivasa's Samoan tattoo journey one of worst, and best, experiences of his life". ABC News.
- "Aunty Isabel Reid". Australian of the Year. Archived from the original on 17 January 2021.
- Bamblett, Lawrence (2013). Our Stories are Our Survival. Aboriginal Studies Press. ISBN 978-1-922-05922-2.
- Beddoe, Noel (2012). The Yalda Crossing. University of Queensland Press. ISBN 978-0-702-24939-6.
- Best, Odette; Slinger, Abigaill; Kerin, Rani (28 October 2024). "Isobelle Mary Ferguson". Australian Dictionary of Biography. ANU. National Centre of Biography.
- Briggs, Ronald (2011). Cumming, Helen (ed.). Carved Trees: Aboriginal cultures of western NSW, Wiradjuri Country (PDF). State Library of New South Wales. ISBN 978-0-7313-7206-5.
- Clarke, Philip A. (2008). Aboriginal Plant Collectors: Botanists and Australian Aboriginal People in the Nineteenth Century. Rosenberg Publishers. ISBN 978-1-877-05868-4.
- Courtenay, Bryce (2000). Jessica. Penguin Books. ISBN 978-0-141-94220-9.
- Curr, Edward Micklethwaite, ed. (1887). The Australian race: its origin, languages, customs, place of landing in Australia and the routes by which it spread itself over the continent (PDF). Vol. 3. Melbourne: J. Ferres. pp. 420–423 – via Internet Archive.
- Dixon, R. M. W. (2002). Australian Languages: Their Nature and Development. Cambridge University Press. ISBN 978-0-521-47378-1.
- Dollin, Shawn. "David Grant - Playing Career - Summary". www.rugbyleagueproject.org. Archived from the original on 31 March 2023.
- Donaldson, Tamsin (1984). "What's in a name? An etymological view of land, language and social identification from central western New South Wales" (PDF). Aboriginal History. 8 (1): 21–44.
- Howitt, Alfred William (1904). The native tribes of south-east Australia (PDF). Macmillan.
- Innes, Michelle (8 April 2016). "An Heir to a Tribe's Culture Ensures Its Language Is Not Forgotten". The New York Times.
- Kissane, Andy (June 1999). "The station owner's daughter, Narrandera". Quadrant. 43 (6): 42–43.
- "Koonadan Historic Site management documents". Office of Environment and Heritage.
- Koonadan Historic Site: Plan of management (PDF). NSW National Parks & Wildlife Service. September 1996a. ISBN 0-7310-0855-3.
- "Remembering Jack Patten (1905–1957)". Koori History. 29 February 2016.
- Langton, Marcia (2010). "They Made a Solitude and Called it Peace". In Perkins, Rachel; Langton, Marcia (eds.). First Australians Unillustrated. Miegunyah Press. pp. 1–41. ISBN 978-0-522-85954-6.
- MacIntyre, F. Gwynplaine (2001). Schweitzer, Darrell (ed.). Macintyre's Improbable Bestiary. Wildside Press. ISBN 978-1-587-15472-0.
- Mathews, R. H. (1908). "The Bunan Ceremony of New South Wales". American Anthropologist. 9 (10): 327–344. doi:10.1525/aa.1896.9.10.02a00010. JSTOR 658900.
- McCarthy, Frederick D. (1 June 1940). "The Carved Trees of New South Wales" (PDF). Australian Museum Magazine. pp. 161–166.
- McNaboe, Diane; Poetsch, Susan (2010). "Language revitalisation: community and school programs working together" (PDF). In Hobson, John Robert (ed.). Re-awakening Languages: Theory and Practice in the Revitalisation of Australia's Indigenous Languages. Sydney University Press. pp. 216–224. ISBN 978-1-920-89955-4.
- Nash, David (2014). "Comitative placenames in central NSW" (PDF). In Clark, Ian D.; Hercus, Luise; Kostanski, Laura (eds.). Indigenous and Minority Placenames: Australian and International Perspectives. Australian National University. pp. 11–37. ISBN 978-1-925-02162-2.
- "Ngurrumbang". Adelaide Film Festival. 10–12 October 2013.
- Owen, Brodie (12 February 2016). "Doubt cast on Wagga being the "place of many crows"". The Daily Advertiser.
- Pandaram, Jamie; Wood, Lauren (22 May 2023). "Indigenous Sport Month: Time for footy codes to create opportunity for Indigenous coaches". CodeSports.
- Pearce, Melanie (29 January 2016). "Living history: Carved trees and a marble headstone connecting Aboriginal and European pasts". ABC Central West.
- "NRL 2020 Indigenous Player map" (PDF). National Rugby League. 2020.
- Ridley, William; Livingstone, H; Günther, James; Broughton, William Grant; Threlkeld, Lancelot Edward; Fraser, John; Taplin, George (1892). An Australian language as spoken by the Awabakal, the people of Awaba or Lake Macquarie (near Newcastle, New South Wales): being an account of their language, traditions and customs. Charles Potter, Govt. Printer. pp. ix–x, + – via Internet Archive.
- Rudder, John; Grant, Stan (2005). A first Wiradjuri Dictionary: English to Wiradjuri and Categories. Restoration House. ISBN 978-0-869-42131-4.
- Rudder, John; Grant, Stan (2010). A New Wiradjuri Dictionary. Restoration House. ISBN 978-0-869-42150-5.
- Silcox, Beejay (20 May 2021). "Bila Yarrudhanggalangdhuray by Anita Heiss review – a mighty and generous heartsong". The Guardian.
- Thieberger, Nick; McGregor, William, eds. (1994). Macquarie Aboriginal Words: A Dictionary of Words from Australian Aboriginal and Torres Strait Islander Languages. Macquarie Library. ISBN 978-0-949-75779-1 – via Internet Archive.
- Threlkeld, Lancelot Edward; Fraser, John; Livingstone, H; Taplin, George; Günther, James; Broughton, William Grant; Ridley, William (2008). An Australian language as spoken by the Awabakal, the people of Awaba or Lake Macquarie (near Newcastle, New South Wales): being an account of their language, traditions and customs. Charles Potter, Govt. Printer – via Internet Archive.
- Tindale, Norman Barnett (1974). "Wiradjuri (NSW)". Aboriginal Tribes of Australia: Their Terrain, Environmental Controls, Distribution, Limits, and Proper Names. Australian National University Press. ISBN 978-0-708-10741-6.
- Tomazin, Alanna (4 December 2018). "Mingaan's Aunty Helen Riley selected into highly regarded committee". Lithgow Mercury.
- "University of Melbourne Find An Expert Assoc Professor Jeanine Leane". University of Melbourne. 25 February 2021.
- Warrant, Eric; Frost, Barrie; Green, Ken; Mouritsen, Henrik; Dreyer, David; Adden, Andrea; Brauburger, Kristina; Heinze, Stanley (2016). "The Australian Bogong Moth Agrotis infusa: A Long-Distance Nocturnal Navigator". Frontiers in Behavioral Neuroscience. 10: 77. doi:10.3389/fnbeh.2016.00077. ISSN 1662-5153. PMC 4838632. PMID 27147998.
- Wilson, Rohan (11 August 2012). "Noel Beddoe makes a brave exploration of contested terrain". The Australian.
- Yathong Nature Reserve, Nombinnie Nature Reserve and Round Hill Nature Reserve: Plan of management (PDF) (PDF). NSW National Parks & Wildlife Service. November 1996b. ISBN 0-7310-0845-6.
