= Bronwyn Fredericks =

Indigenous Australian academic

Bronwyn Fredericks FAHA is an Indigenous Australian academic and administrator. Her scholarship extends across education, health, community development, policy, and Indigenist research methods, including a focus on work relevant to Aboriginal and Torres Strait Islander people using participatory and community led approaches. Her contributions have been recognised through the NAIDOC Education Award in 2022 and the Aboriginal and Torres Strait Islander Health Award in 2019. She is currently the Deputy Vice Chancellor (Indigenous Engagement) at the University of Queensland.

Fredericks has over 100 academic publications, and also writes for general audiences through publications such as The Conversation and Croakey Health Media, an Australian not for profit public interest journalism organisation, as well as actively using social media to promote health and education issues.

== Biography ==
Fredericks graduated from Brisbane College of Advanced Education with a Diploma of Teaching (Secondary Education) in 1989. She completed her Bachelor of Education at Queensland University of Technology in 1991, followed by a Master of Education (Leadership Education) in 1996. A further Master of Education Studies was completed at the University of Tasmania in 2000. She graduated with her Doctor of Philosophy (PhD) in 2004 from Central Queensland University for her thesis titled "Us Speaking about Women’s Health: Aboriginal women’s perceptions and experiences of health, well-being, identity, body and health services".

Fredericks spent many years living and working in Central Queensland on Darumbal Country in academic, health promotion, health service management, and government roles. She worked in the community-controlled health sector in research and management and was Chief Executive Officer at Bidgerdii Aboriginal and Torres Strait Islander Community Health Service, before returning to academia to take up fellowships at Queensland University of Technology, before taking up the BHP Billiton Mitsubishi Alliance Chair in Indigenous Engagement and Pro Vice-Chancellor Indigenous Engagement Role at Central Queensland University in 2012. At Central Queensland University, she was also President of the Academic Board.

During this period Fredericks led the health node for the Australian Research Council funded National Indigenous Researchers and Knowledges Network (NIRAKN). In 2016 she was appointed as a Commissioner for the Queensland Productivity Commission, where she was the Presiding Commissioner for the 2017 Inquiry into service delivery in Queensland’s remote and discrete Indigenous communities and was a Commissioner for the Inquiry into Imprisonment and Recidivism in 2019.

In 2018, Fredericks was appointed as the Pro Vice-Chancellor, Indigenous Engagement at the University of Queensland, with responsibility for leading the implementation of the university's Indigenous strategy, including the first Reconciliation Action Plan. She was elected a Fellow of the Australian Academy of the Humanities in 2023.
