= Rose Richards =

Australian healthcare worker and human rights advocate

Rose Richards is an Australian healthcare worker and human rights advocate. Also known as Mookai Rosie (Aunty Rosie) she is an Aboriginal community leader, a Kuku Yalanji and Tagalaka elder from Far North Queensland. She advocated for culturally safe health care for Aboriginal people and Torres Strait Islander maternity patients and established Australia's first Indigenous community-controlled corporation that specialises in health care services for women and children.

== Early life ==
Rose Richards (née Grogan) grew up at the Mona Mona Aboriginal Mission, run by the Seventh-day Adventist Church near Kuranda. A descendant of the Kuku Yalanji and Tagalaka people in Far North Queensland.

== Advocacy ==
During the late 1970s Richards worked at Cairns Base Hospital as an Aboriginal welfare officer. She became concerned about the welfare of children born in Cairns to women from remote communities in Cape York and the Torres Strait. These women come to Cairns four to six weeks before the birth of their babies because there are no birthing facilities in remote Cape York and western Queensland, and women from the Torres Strait who require specialist obstetric care also come to Cairns. Their children were frequently developing serious health complications because of the lack of appropriate medical services in their communities when they returned home.

Richards and her sister Esme Hudson began taking expectant and new mums into their homes in a community based initiative to provide a culturally safe place for these women to wait for the birth of their babies.

Richards continued to advocate and in 1983 established Mookai Rosie-bi Bayan (Aunty Rosie's Place) as a hostel to provide accommodation for Aboriginal women from Far North Queensland awaiting the births of their babies in Cairns. As well as safe accommodation, Mookai Rosie-bi Bayan offers mothers advice on nutrition and provides prenatal and postnatal care and support.

In 2009, preparations for the construction of a 24-bed facility began in Edmonton, south of Cairns and Mookai Rosie-bi Bayan moved to its current location in 2010. It is Far North Queensland's only Aboriginal and Torres Strait Islander women's accommodation service run and staffed by Aboriginal and Torres Strait islander women and Australia's first Indigenous community-controlled corporation that specialises in health care services for women and children.

Richards was also involved in establishing the Wuchopperen Medical Service and the ATSI Medical Service in Cairns.

== Awards ==
- 2013 NAIDOC Female Elder of the Year
