= Blandowski expedition =

Gallery of specimens collected by Gerard Krefft

The Blandowski expedition was an Australian scientific expedition that took place between 1856 and 1857 to study the natural history of the region and acquire specimens for the Victorian Museum. The expedition departed from Melbourne on route to Mondellimin (now known as Merbein) the area of the junction of the Darling and Murray Rivers in north-western Victoria following the Murray to Goolwa in South Australia.

It was led by William Blandowski, the Victorian government zoologist, and included his assistant, Gerard Krefft who maintained a diary of the field work.

== Background ==
Blandowski, who had come to Australia to compile a "natural history, botanical classification and geological arrangement" secured 2,000 pounds in funding from the Government of Victoria for the expedition.

In 1853 Blandowski applied to Lieutenant-Governor Charles La Trobe for funding for an 'Illustrated Natural History of the Colony of Victoria'. He made the first of several excursions in 1854. In 1856 Blandowski was appointed leader of an expedition to the junction of the Murray and Darling Rivers to collect specimens for the National Museum.

== Route ==
Blandowski's party headed north from Melbourne to Lancefield, then following land the south of the Murray River north-west along Echuca, Gunbower, Pyramid Hill, Lake Boga, and Swan Hill. The party crossed the Murray briefly at Euston before visiting the areas of Mildura, Yelta, Mondellimin crossing briefly into New South Wales at Wentworth. He continued to follow the Murray River to South Australia establishing camps at Moorundee and Goolwa and arrived in Adelaide in August 1857 before returning to Melbourne.

== Legacy ==
The expedition collected 17,400 scientific specimens contained in 28 boxes. 19 new species of fish were discovered. Accounts from the expedition were later illustrated by various artists including Gustav Mützel and Blandowski himself.

Despite not being a primary objective the expedition collected a large amount of information on the indigenous Australian tribes of the area, many of which were documented in illustrations and other artefacts. Blandowski presented ‘Superstitions, Customs and Burials of the Aborigines’ the first address of its kind to the Melbourne Mechanics' Institute in October 1856 arguing that the scientific value of the study of Aboriginal culture should not be ignored.

Blandowski left Australia shortly following the expedition.

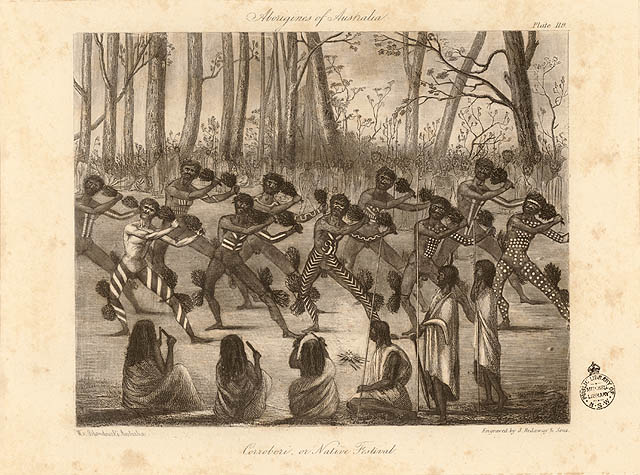
Corroboree 1857

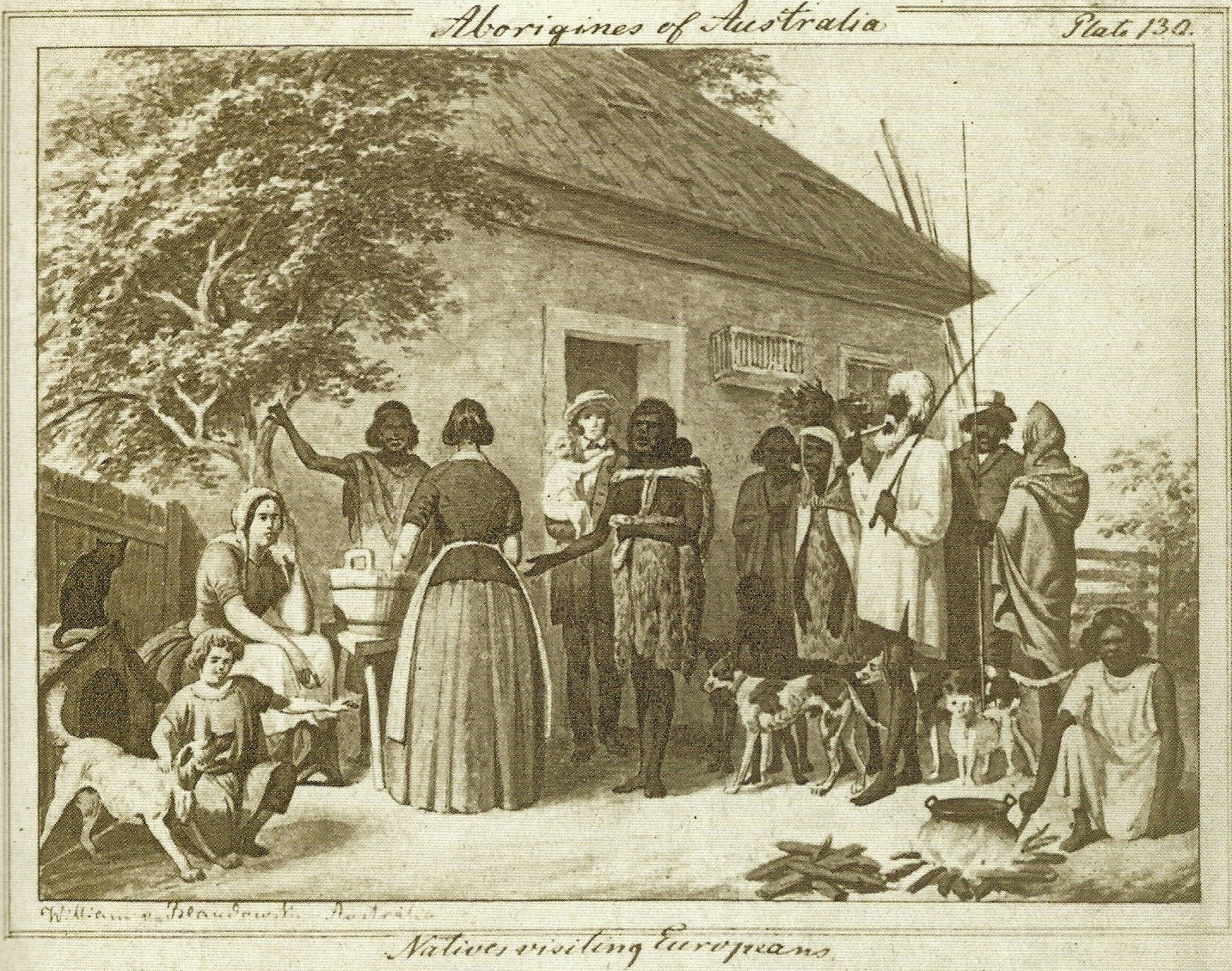
Natives visiting Europeans 1857

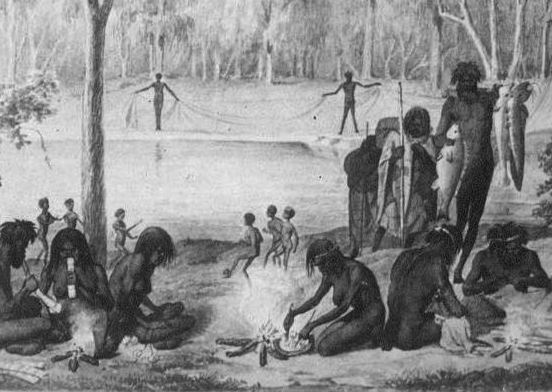
Jarijari domestic scene at Mondellimin 1857 by Gustav Mützel 1862

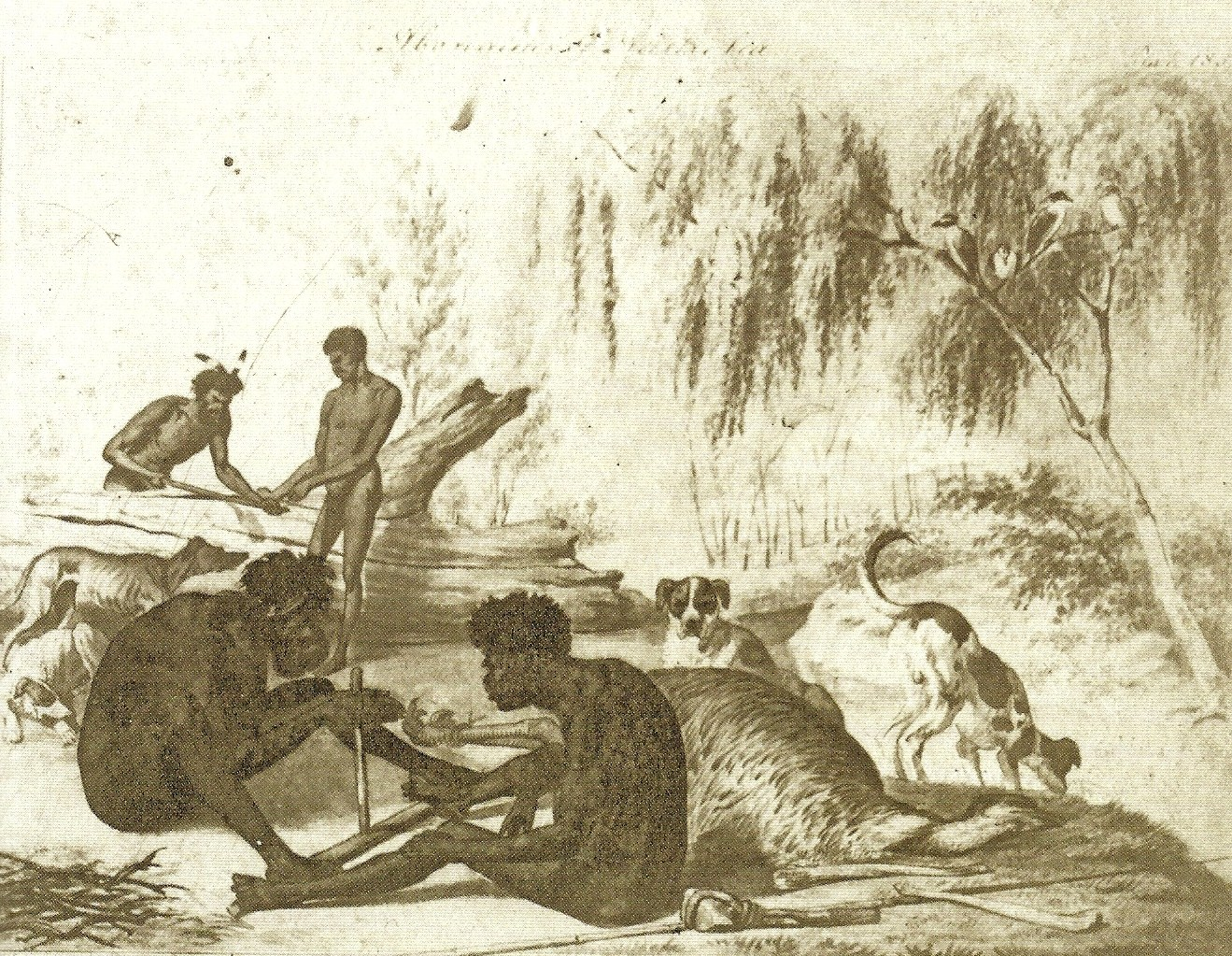
Aboriginal fire making by Gustav Mützel

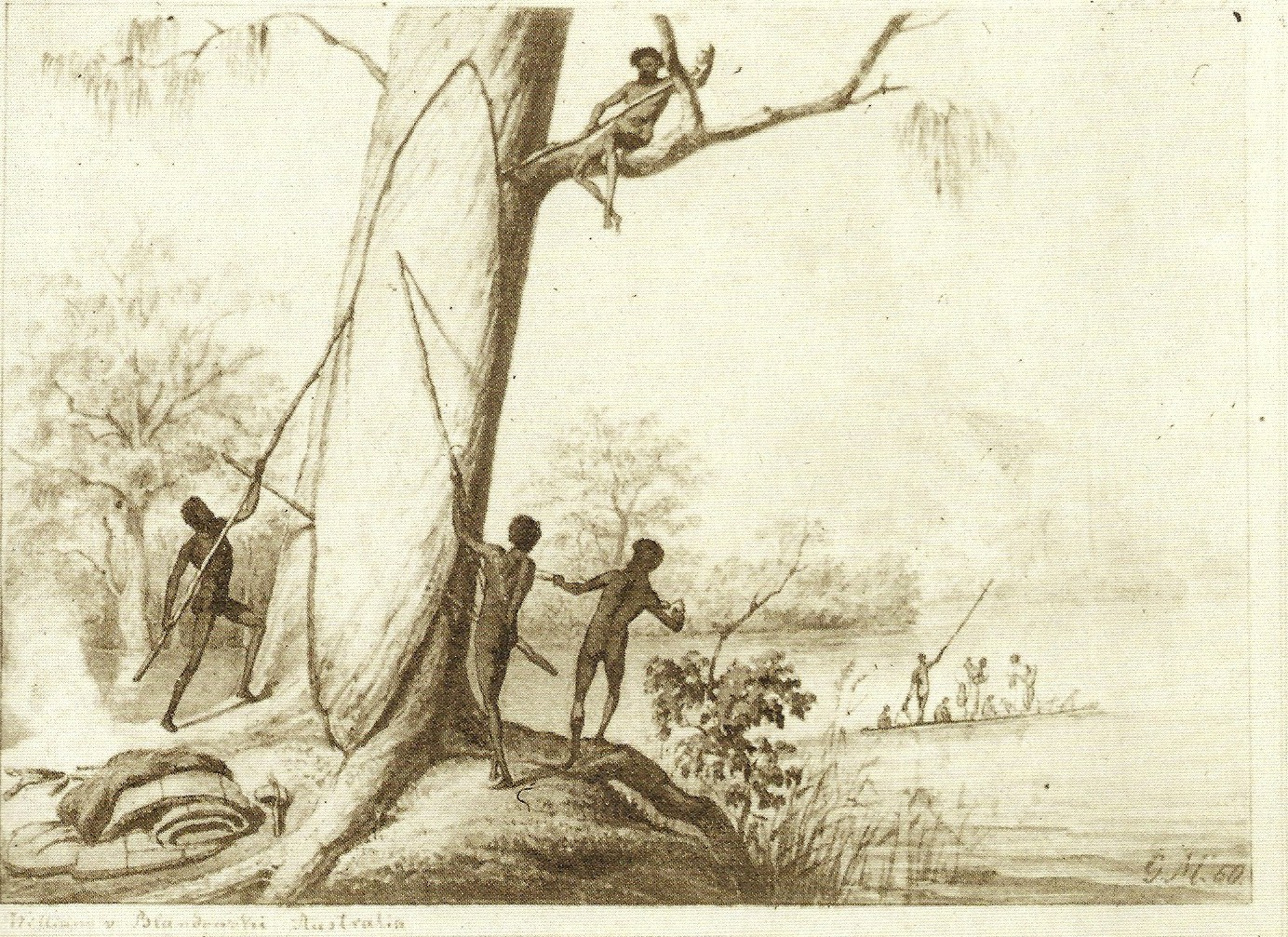
Canoe making by Gustav Mützel

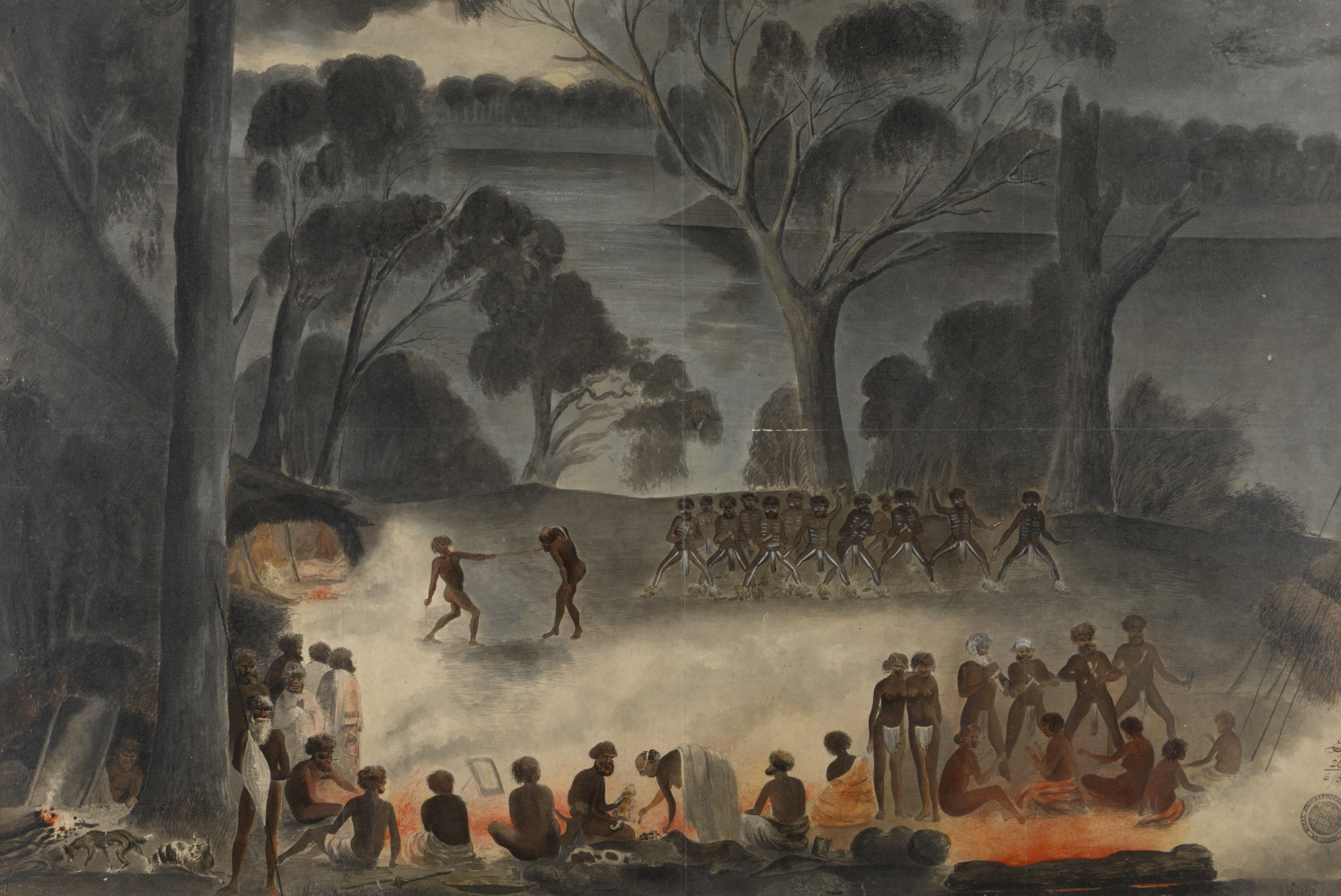
Corroboree on the Murray River by Gerard Krefft, 1857

A monument was erected at Merbein in 2007 to commemorate the 150th Anniversary of the expedition.
