= Yuranigh =

Indigenous guide and stockman

The grave of Yuranigh near Molong.

Yuranigh (approx. 1820 – April 1850) was an Australian Indigenous guide and stockman. Yuranigh was born in New South Wales and died in New South Wales.

Yuranigh accompanied Thomas Mitchell as an Aboriginal guide on his 1845–46 expedition to central Queensland. Mitchell wrote of him:

"...his intelligence and his judgment rendered him so necessary to me that he was ever at my elbow … Confidence in him was never misplaced. He well knew the character of all the white men in the party. Nothing escaped his penetrating eye and quick ear. Yuranigh was particularly clean in his person, frequently washing, and his glossy shining black hair, always well-combed, gave him an uncommonly clean and decent appearance."

After the expedition, Yuranigh returned to Sydney with Mitchell before relocating to Boree, where he died and was buried by his people. There are four carved trees around the grave site, indicating that Yuranigh was a man of special honour. The trees are believed to be the highest remaining number of carved trees around a single grave.

== See also ==
- Grave of Yuranigh
- List of Indigenous Australian historical figures
