= Stan Grant (Wiradjuri elder) =

Aboriginal Australian elder (born 1940)

Stan Grant Sr. AM
- Born: Stanley Vernard Grant; 1940 (age 85–86); Australia
- Occupation: Teacher
- Family: Stan Grant (son)
- Awards: Member of the Order of Australia (2009) "For service to Indigenous education and the preservation and promotion of the Wiradjuri language and culture, as a teacher and author, and to youth." Deadly Award (2004) "for outstanding achievement in Aboriginal and Torres Strait Islander education"

Stanley Vernard Grant Sr AM (born 1940) is an elder of the Wiradjuri tribe of Indigenous Australians from what is now the south-west inland region of the state of New South Wales, Australia. The grandson of an elder who was gaoled for speaking his own language, Grant Sr now teaches the Wiradjuri language to students.

== Background and language work ==
Grant was born in Cowra. His siblings include educator Flo Grant, Elaine Grant, Ivan Grant, and Pastor Cecil Grant.

For many years, Grant was an itinerant worker. Some times, he sold fruit and vegetables. At another time, he worked as a sawmiller, where he lost the tips of two fingers in industrial accidents.

Grant is one of the few people still living to have heard native speakers of his tribe's Wiradjuri language, having been brought up as a child around native speakers of his grandfather's generation, notably his grandfather on his mother's side, Wilfred Johnson. Johnson could speak seven languages. He was arrested in the late 1940s after a policeman overheard him calling to his son in Wiradjuri – it was forbidden to use Aboriginal languages in public – and he was detained overnight in a cell. From that day on, his grandfather refrained from speaking his native language in public. However, he continued to teach young Stan and his brother Cecil.

His father on his father's side was Bill Grant, who had lived on Bulgandramine Mission.

He has been crucial to the reconstruction of the Wiradjuri language along with John Rudder, with whom he travels among the Wiradjuri people, teaching their language. From a small base of anthropological records, they have rebuilt the spoken and sung language among both urban and rural tribal members. In 2005 they published "A New Wiradjuri Dictionary”, running to some 600 pages. In 2006 this work was recognised with the Deadly Award of Outstanding Achievement in Aboriginal and Torres Strait Islander Education.

The Wiradjuri language, culture and heritage course at Charles Sturt University was developed by Grant and, as of 2024, he still attends the graduation ceremonies of students.

== Personal ==
His father was Cecil, who served in the 9th Division in Tobruk.

Grant married Betty Cameron, whose family came from Gunnedah Hill, near Coonabarabran. After marrying, they lived in a broken car in the Aboriginal reserve near Griffith. The couple have several children and many grandchildren. They include the noted journalist, Stan Grant and his daughter, the radio presenter Lowanna Grant.

The couple live near Narrandera, at the southern end of Wiradjuri country.

Grant Jnr. recalls the family frequently living in modest huts on the outskirts of towns in country NSW, the family frequently moving so Grant senior could find work.

In May 2017, the son interviewed his father to commemorate the 50th anniversary of the 1967 referendum to alter the Constitution of Australia to recognise Aboriginal people. The father discussed how he experienced overt racism as a young man:

Racism was in your face. I was called nigger, boong, coon, abbo, blackie, you name it, I copped it all the time. You couldn't own a block of land, you couldn't own a house, you had to rent one. You couldn't be out late at night, you had to [be] gone by sundown from the street. There were many, many, things we couldn't do.

Yet, he later noted differences in how people treated him:

In 69-70 there I noticed there were some changes being made. The racism that was in our face, wasn't there, it was behind us a bit, it was more of an undercurrent. It gave us the right to be citizens, in our country that was ours in the first place.

== Publications ==
- Stories Told By My Grandfather and the Other Old Men: a collection of short stories (1999)
- Crossing Cultures: experiences of growing up Aboriginal in Wiradjuri country (1999)

With Dr John Rudder:

- Learning Wiradjuri 1–5 (graded texts)
- Learning Wiradjuri 1 & 2 CD
- A Teaching Wiradjuri Support CD
- Eric Looks for a Friend (PowerPoint book)
- Wiradjuri Language Songs for Children
- Wiradjuri Language Song Book 2
- CD of Wiradjuri Language Songs
- Wiradjuri Language – How it works: A Grammar in Everyday English
- Wiradjuri Language A First Dictionary of Wiradjuri
- Wiradjuri Sentence Book
- Wiradjuri Language Black Line Poster Masters
- Wiradjuri Language Black Line Masters – Book 1 (Colouring-in)
- Wiradjuri Language Black Line Masters – Book 2 – Learn to Draw
- Wiradjuri Language Colouring-in Books 1 and 2
- Wiradjuri Language Learn to Draw Books 1 and 2
- English Language Blackline Poster Masters of Australian Natural Science & People
- Unlabelled Blackline Poster Masters of Australian Natural Science & People

== Honours ==
Grant was named a Member of the Order of Australia on 8 June 2009 "for service to Indigenous education and the preservation and promotion of the Wiradjuri language and culture, as a teacher and author, and to youth".

He was granted an honorary Doctorate of Letters by Charles Sturt University in December 2013 in recognition of his work with the indigenous communities. The vice-chancellor of CSU, Andrew Vann is quoted as saying "[Grant] has made an outstanding contribution to Charles Sturt University's regions, especially to Indigenous communities ... As an Elder, author and teacher, he has made an outstanding intellectual contribution to our communities. His deep involvement in the introduction of the University's new Graduate Certificate in Wiradjuri Language, Culture and Heritage program in 2014 is a clear demonstration of his work."

In the 2022 NAIDOC Awards Grant's work was recognised with the Lifetime Achievement Award.

== See also ==
- List of Indigenous Australian group names
