= John Rudder =

Australian linguist

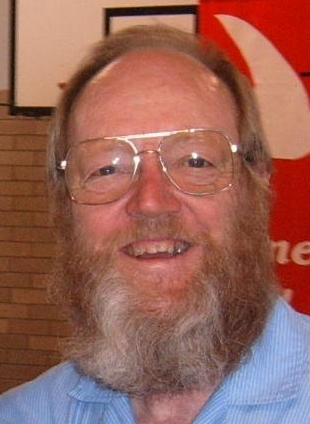
John Rudder

John Rudder was an Australian linguist who studied the Australian Aboriginal languages, of Arnhem Land (Gupapuyngu) in the Northern Territory and the state of New South Wales (Wiradjuri), Australia.

== Work ==
In 1964, Rudder went to Arnhem Land as a teacher, and later as a community development worker and educator among adult Indigenous Australians. In that time he learned to speak the language of the region, and analysed its grammar and syntax.

He sought to gain formal educational qualifications after moving to Canberra, and has since gained a master's degree in Anthropology focussing on Aboriginal Classificatory Theory and Cognitive Structures and a Doctor of Philosophy degree in Aboriginal Anthropology focusing on Yolngu Cosmology (focusing on beliefs regarding the nature of existence and how the world is ordered.)

=== Language teaching ===
Stan Grant Sr

From 1993 to 2010, Rudder was heavily involved with Stan Grant Sr, an elder of the Wiradjuri people, in reclaiming the Wiradjuri language that was at that time effectively dead. He took anthropological studies and records amounting to the records of fewer than 2,000 words and applied the language and cognitive analysis he had previously applied to the Yolngu language, to begin to reconstruct the Wiradjuri language. With Grant, who provided a sense of the language remembered from his youth in World War II among Wiradjuri-speaking family and tribal members, notably his grandfather, they have established training sessions to teach the language across Wiradjuri country. Intensive weekend camps, workshops, and other sessions have seen a growing number of Wiradjuri speakers who are beginning to re-establish the language. For instance, these speakers are beginning to write songs and poems that are then being taught to children.

Secondary effects of the cultural use of the Wiradjuri language are being felt within the language group, and beyond. Examples are:

- recognition of the Wiradjuri as a cultural group within the wider society
- use of Wiradjuri words in communities, and in Australian usage
- teaching of Wiradjuri to New South Wales Primary School children

== Art ==
Rudder was an artist for many years, previously entering the Blake Prize for Religious Art. He recently returned to painting, and his entry was selected for display in the exhibition of the inaugural Phoenix Prize for spiritual art in 2005.

== Personal life ==
Rudder was a member of the Uniting Church in Australia. Until her death in 2008 he was married to Trixie, a part-time lay pastor for a congregation of the Uniting Church at Gunning, near Canberra.

In December 2010 he remarried and moved to Sydney. His second wife Julie Waddy OAM worked as an ethnobiologist and linguist working with the Anglican Church Missionary Society on Groote Eylandt in the Northern Territory with the aboriginal people for 30 years, and returned to Sydney in 2005.

Rudder died on 24 July 2021.

== Publications ==
Rudder has self-published a book on the counting (relationship) system of Australian Aborigines, has produced teaching materials for his courses in aboriginal speaking and thought, and is in the process of completing an Aboriginal–English dictionary. His recent writing has been extensively in collaboration with Stan Grant.

Rudder's publications include:

- Rudder, John; Yolngu Cosmology: An Unchanging Cosmos Incorporating a Rapidly Changing World, DPhil thesis, Australian National University, 1993
- An Introduction to Aboriginal Art
- An Introduction to Aboriginal Mathematics
- The Natural World of the Yolngu: The Aboriginal People of North East Arnhem Land
- Aboriginal Religion and the Dreaming
- The Bark Paintings of North East Arnhem Land
- Learning Wiradjuri 1–5 (graded texts)
- Learning Wiradjuri 1&2 CD
- A Teaching Wiradjuri Support CD
- Eric Looks for a Friend (PowerPoint book)
- Wiradjuri Language Songs for Children
- Wiradjuri Language Song Book 2
- CD of Wiradjuri Language Songs
- Wiradjuri Language – How it works: A Grammar in Everyday English
- Wiradjuri Language A First Dictionary of Wiradjuri
- Wiradjuri Sentence Book
- Wiradjuri Language Black Line Poster Masters
- Wiradjuri Language Black Line Masters – Book 1 (Colouring-in)
- Wiradjuri Language Black Line Masters –Book 2– Learn to Draw
- Wiradjuri Language Colouring-in Books 1 and 2
- Wiradjuri Language Learn to Draw Books 1 and 2
- English Language Blackline Poster Masters of Australian Natural Science & People
- Unlabelled Blackline Poster Masters of Australian Natural Science & People
- Towards Holiness, (2007), ISBN 0-86942-143-3, Restoration House

In July 2006, the Parkes Shire Library (central west NSW) inaugurated its collection of books on Wiradjuri attended by Wiradjuri language students from Primary schools at Forbes, Peak Hill and Central West Christian School, whose teachers were learning from Rudder and Grant.

== See also ==
- List of Indigenous Australian group names
- Yolngu
- Yolngu Matha
- Wiradjuri
- Wiradjuri language

== Sources ==
Stebbins, Tonya N.; Eira, Kris; Couzens, Vicki L. (2017). Living Languages and New Approaches to Language Revitalisation Research. Routledge. ISBN 978-1-351-97794-4.
