= Koori Mail =

Australian newspaper written and owned by Indigenous Australians

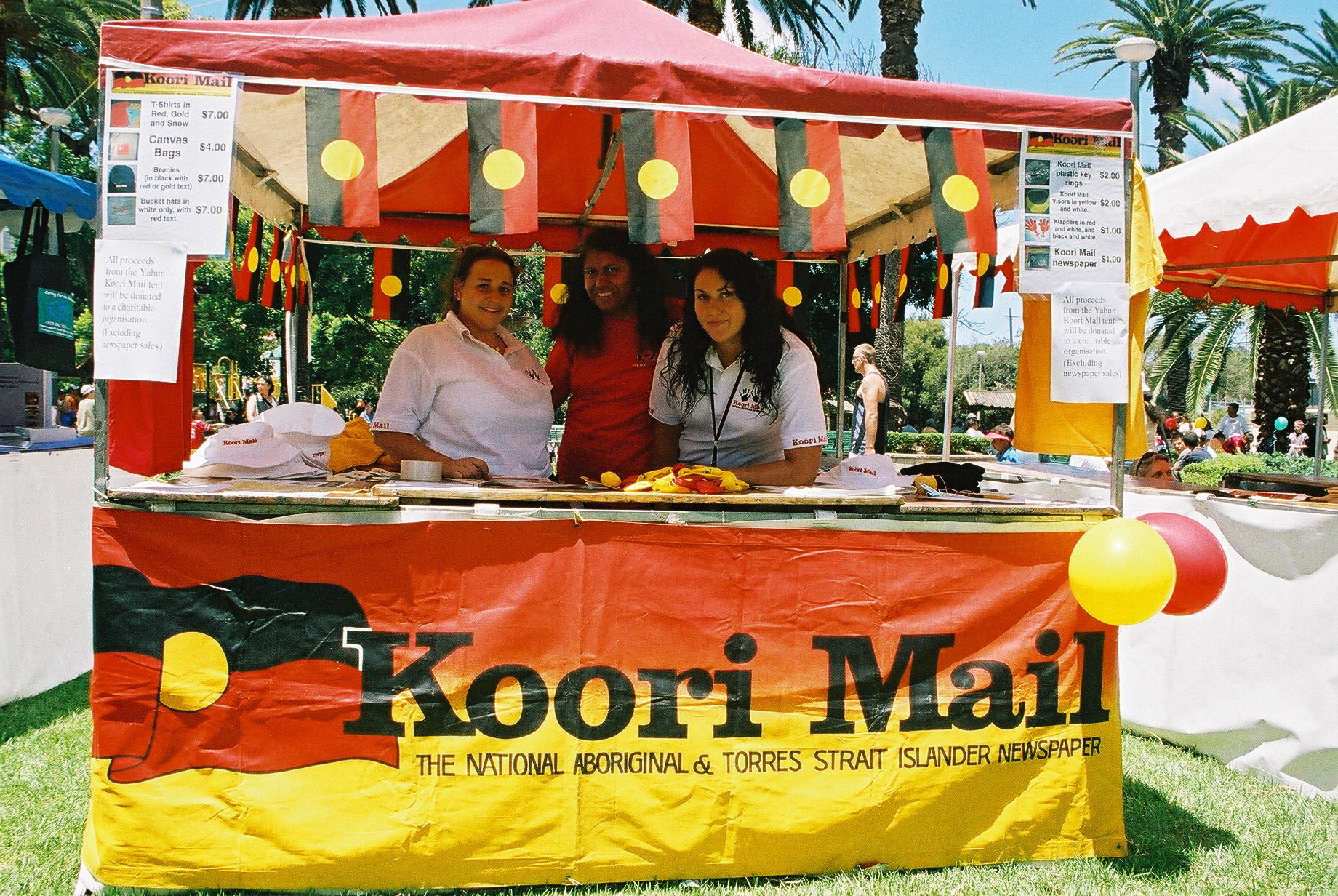
- Koori Mail
- Type: Biweekly
- Owner(s): Bunjum Co-operative; Buyinbin Inc; Kurrachee Co-operative; Bundjalung Tribal Society; Nungera Co-operative
- Editor: Darren Coyne
- Founded: 1991
- Headquarters: Lismore, New South Wales, Australia
- ISSN: 1038-8516
- Website: www.koorimail.com

The Koori Mail is an Australian newspaper written and owned by Indigenous Australians since 1991. It is published fortnightly in printed form and electronic copies are available. Owned by five community-based Aboriginal organisations based in Lismore, in northern New South Wales, its profits are spent on community projects and needs. "Koori" is a demonym for the Aboriginal peoples of parts of New South Wales and Victoria.

== History ==
The term Koori is a demonym for Aboriginal Australians from the approximate region now known as southern New South Wales and Victoria, derived from the Awabakal language.

The Koori Mail was founded in 1991 by Walbunja man Owen Carriage, who moved from the South Coast of NSW to Lismore on request by local people, including Pastor Frank Roberts, father of Rhoda Roberts. Carriage had been involved with the Aboriginal Tent Embassy in Canberra after the Royal Commission into Black Deaths in Custody. There, he and Pastor Frank Roberts thought of the idea of a newspaper devoted to Aboriginal issues, after being disappointed with the mainstream newspapers' coverage of the event. He was inspired by activists such as Gary Foley and Lyall Munro Jnr.

The fledging venture suffered from both lack of funding and a lack of experienced journalists at first, and was assisted by non-Indigenous freelance journalists such as Liz Tynan. The Lismore newspaper The Northern Star then provided printing and editorial assistance to Carriage, and Janine Wilson, a Northern Star journalist, was appointed the first non-Indigenous editor of Koori Mail.

The headline story in the first issue on 23 May 1991, which comprised 24 pages and had a print run of 10,000, was about a recent report into violent racism in Australia and the high levels of abuse suffered by Aboriginal people in police custody.

In 1992, The Northern Star, while seeing the potential of the paper, could not afford to support it financially while it built its readership, and there was a large debt to be paid off. The local Bundjalung Aboriginal corporation was able to obtain an ATSIC loan of A$226,000, and ownership was assumed by a group of local Aboriginal communities representing the Bundjalung nation: the Bundjalung Tribal Society (based at Lismore), Bunjum Co-operative (Cabbage Tree Island), Buyinbin Co-operative (Casino), Kurrachee Cooperative (Coraki), and Nungera Co-operative Maclean). The Bygal Weahunir Holding Company (BWHC), an amalgamation of the five bodies, acquired an 80 percent holding, while 20 percent was retained by The Northern Star. At first it was only circulated only in northern News South Wales and Queensland, but within a few years it had built up a network of Indigenous and non-Indigenous stringers across the country and was distributed nationally.

Janine Wilson was later replaced by another non-Indigenous journalist, Dona Graham, who was subsequently replaced by Aboriginal journalist Todd Condie as editor in 1998. Condie left to work on Land Rights News in 2002.

On 4 May 2011, on the date of the publication of the 500th issue of Koori Mail, the Australian Institute of Aboriginal and Torres Strait Islander Studies (AIATSIS) launched its digital collection of the newspaper, in partnership with the Department of Industry and Science, CAVAL (a consortium of universities) and the State Library of New South Wales.

As of May 2021, as the newspaper celebrated its 30th birthday, Rudi Maxwell was the editor of the newspaper, with the staff numbering a total of 12 people.

=== 2022 floods ===
In March 2022 Lismore was hit by record-breaking flooding, and in the immediate aftermath and for months afterwards, Koori Mail coordinated relief for flood victims. Staff and volunteers coordinated by the paper distributed food (including up to 2,000 free meals per day, served from the adjacent Koori Kitchen), clothes, and other essential items for thousands of victims, as well as supporting them with counselling. All of this came from donations; financial support from the New South Wales Government only came months later, in June.

The Koori Mail team and volunteers received the national NAIDOC Innovation Award, which recognised their "coordination and leadership" after the flood.

== Description ==
Run by Aboriginal and Torres Strait Islander people through five Aboriginal community organisations based in northern New South Wales, the Koori Mail is based in Lismore. The newspaper is published fortnightly and is available by subscription and in newsagents in every Australian state and territory, as well as in PDF form online via the AIATSIS website (where all past issues are also available).

It is a source of news and information on Aboriginal and Torres Strait Islander people, communities and events throughout Australia. It covers general news as well as health, education, employment, culture, the arts, and sport, and has correspondents and contributors in every state and territory.

As of 2021 its circulation is around 10,000, but it is estimated that it is read by ten times that number. According to McNair Ingenuity Research, readership is around 100,000. It is sold at newsagents in all mainland states and territories of Australia, and Tasmania.

All profits are distributed to the community through the five owner organisations and spent on uses such as scholarships for Aboriginal students, housing and mental health programmes. The organisation offers entry-level jobs as well as traineeships based in schools, to help young Indigenous writers to gain experience.

The Lismore office established a studio for broadcasting radio and podcasts, from 2021, initially focusing on Bundjalung issues, but the printed copy is still the most important component.

== Staff ==
As of October 2022, Darren Coyne is acting editor and the total staff number seven people.

Bundjalung and Dunghutti woman Naomi Moran has been general manager since 2016, and holds the role as of October 2022.

As of 2016 Russell Kapeen was chair of the board.

== Online ==
Apart from the full set of issues being available on the AIATSIS website, there is also an index. The Australian Indigenous Index, or INFOKOORI, is an index to Koori Mail, covering from May 1991 to July 2016. Hosted by SLNSW also covers biographical information from various other magazines, including Identity; Our Aim; and Dawn / New Dawn.

== Awards ==
- 2011: Newspaper of the Year award at the PANPA Awards (non-dailies with a circulation of up to 10,000)
- 2022: NAIDOC Innovation Award, which recognising their "coordination and leadership" after the floods

== Notable people ==
Aboriginal journalist Todd Condie graduated from Griffith University with a Bachelor of Humanities majoring in film, media studies and politics. He started at the Koori Mail as a cadet 1992, then worked as journalist and was appointed editor in 1998, taking over from (non-Indigenous) Dona Graham. In 2002, Condie left the Koori Mail to work on Land Rights News in the Northern Territory.

Kirstie Parker, as of May 2021 (since 2017) the Director of Aboriginal Affairs and Reconciliation in the Department of Premier and Cabinet in South Australia, is a former Koori Mail journalist.

Theatre director and arts executive Rhoda Roberts, daughter of co-founder Frank Roberts Jnr, was appointed the cultural lead at Koori Mail late in her life (she died in March 2026).

== See also ==
- Koori Bina, a 1970s monthly published by Black Women's Action
- National Indigenous Times
