= Harry Phillip Hall =

Harry Phillip Hall (1946 - ) is an Australian human rights activist, public servant and Aboriginal community leader. Hall is a Gomeroi and Euahlayi man, born in Walgett, NSW in 1946.

Walgett had a "colour bar", excluding Aboriginal people from some venues including the RSL and segregating them in venues like the cinema and the hospital. Hall was born in a segregated Blacks only labour ward at Walgett District Hospital.

Together with his father, activist Harry Hall, he was one of the supporters of the 1965 Freedom Ride that drew national attention to the living conditions of Aboriginal people and the racism they experienced in New South Wales country towns.

Hall worked in Australian Indigenous affairs, advocating for land rights and supporting justice for Aboriginal and Torres Strait Islander people. He was directly involved in the NSW Annual Aboriginal Rugby League Knockout Carnival (Koori Knockout) sporting events for many years and organised Survival Day concerts.

== Awards ==
- 2025 - NAIDOC Male Elder Award
