= Wiradjuri language =

Traditional language of the Wiradjuri people of Australia

Wiradjuri
- Wiradhuray, Wiradyuray
- Region: New South Wales
- Ethnicity: Wiradjuri, Weraerai, ?Jeithi
- Native speakers: 1,479 (2021)
- Language family: Pama–Nyungan: Wiradhuric; Wiradjuri
- Dialects: Wirraayaraay (Wiraiari) (?); Jeithi (?); Warramunga; Marrinbula; Binjang; Mowgee; Dabee; Kaliyarrpiyalung; Ngarrumayiny

Language codes
- ISO 639-3: wrh
- Glottolog: wira1262
- AIATSIS: D10
- ELP: Wiradjuri
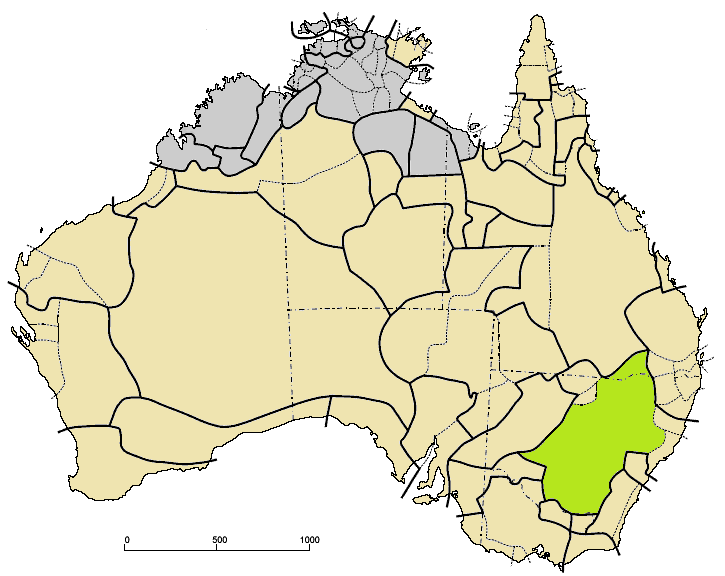
- Wiradhuric languages (green) among other Pama–Nyungan languages (tan)

- Wiradjuri is classified as Critically Endangered by the UNESCO Atlas of the World's Languages in Danger.

Wiradjuri (/wəˈrædʒʊri/; many other spellings, see Wiradjuri) is a Pama–Nyungan language of the Wiradhuric subgroup. It is the traditional language of the Wiradjuri people, an Aboriginal Australian people of New South Wales, Australia. Wiraiari and Jeithi may have been dialects.

A revival is under way, with the language being taught in schools, TAFE college, and at Charles Sturt University.

== Reclamation ==
=== Teaching ===
The Wiradjuri language has been taught in primary schools, secondary schools and at TAFE since before 2012 in the towns of Parkes and Forbes. It is taught at Condobolin. Northern Wiradjuri schools such as Peak Hill, Dubbo, Narromine, Wellington, Gilgandra, Trangie, and Geurie by AECG (Note: Aboriginal Education Consultative Group, a NSW Government insrumentality) language and culture educators. All lessons include both Indigenous and non-Indigenous Australians. As of 2017 the language was also being taught in Young, having a positive impact on the number of pupils self-identifying as Aboriginal.

Charles Sturt University also offers a two-year course in Wiradjuri language, heritage, and culture, focusing on language reclamation. This course, which commenced in 2014, was developed by Wiradjuri Elder, Dr Stan Grant Senior, as part of their Wiradjuri Language and Cultural Heritage Recovery Project.

=== Dictionary ===
The process of reclaiming the language was greatly assisted by the publication in 2005 of A First Wiradjuri Dictionary by elder Stan Grant Senior and academic John Rudder. Rudder described the dictionary: "The Wiradjuri Dictionary has three main sections in just over 400 B5 pages. The first two sections, English to Wiradjuri, and Wiradjuri to English, have about 5,000 entries each. The third sections lists Names of Things grouped in categories such as animals, birds, plants, climate, body parts, colours. In addition to those main sections the dictionary contains an introduction to accurate pronunciation, a basic grammar of the language and a sample range of sentence types." A revised edition, holding over 8,000 words, was published in 2010 and launched in Wagga Wagga, with the launch described by the member for Wagga Wagga to the New South Wales Parliament. A mobile app and web-based version based on the book is also available. A Grammar of Wiradjuri language was published in 2014.

== Phonology ==
=== Consonants ===
	Peripheral		Laminal		Apical	
	Labial	Velar	Dental	Palatal	Alveolar	Retroflex
Plosive	b ⟨b⟩	ɡ ⟨g⟩	d̪ ⟨dh⟩	ɟ ⟨dy⟩	d ⟨d⟩	
Nasal	m ⟨m⟩	ŋ ⟨ng⟩	n̪ ⟨nh⟩	ɲ ⟨ny⟩	n ⟨n⟩	
Lateral					l ⟨l⟩	
Rhotic					r ⟨rr⟩	
Approximant	w ⟨w⟩			j ⟨y⟩		ɻ ⟨r⟩

In most Pama-Nyungan languages, sounds represented by 'k' or 'g' are interchangeable. The same applies to 'b' and 'p' as well as 't' and 'd'.

=== Vowels ===
	Front		Central		Back	
	short	long	short	long	short	long
Close	ɪ ⟨i⟩	iː ⟨ii⟩			ʊ ⟨u⟩	uː~oː ⟨uu⟩
Mid/Open			ə ⟨a⟩	aː ⟨aa⟩		

The phonemes /ə/ and /aː/ tend to be considered as belonging to the same pair (refer to the orthography table below).

== Vocabulary ==
=== "Wagga Wagga" ===
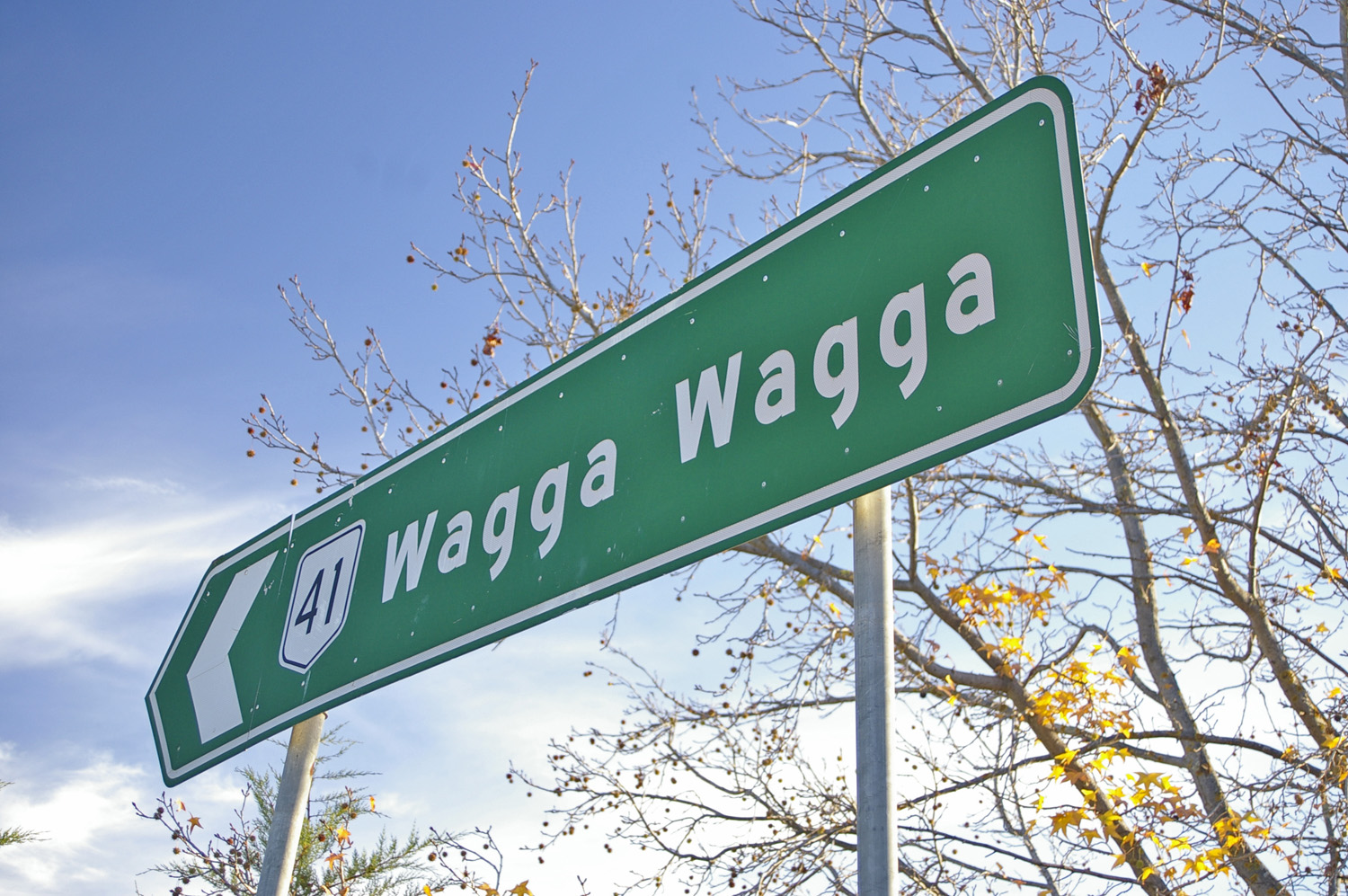
Route 41 Wagga Wagga sign (Mills St)

The Aboriginal inhabitants of the Wagga Wagga region were the Wiradjuri people and the term wagga wagga, with a central open vowel /aː/, means 'dances and celebrations', and has also been translated as 'reeling like a drunken man'.

The Wiradjuri word wagan means 'crow', which can be pluralised by reduplication. Until 2019, it was claimed by the Wagga Wagga council and others that Wagga Wagga translates to "the place of many crows". However, as Uncle Stan Grant Snr. has stated, "Wagga Wagga does sound a bit like Waggon Waggon, but it's not quite the same. If you say "Wagan Wagan," you're saying 'many crows'. And Wagga Wagga means dance celebrations… But the fact is, it's my language, our language, and it's got nothing to do with crows whatsoever.".

=== Ngamadidj ===
The term Ngamadidj ('ghost', or 'white people'), used in the Kuurn Kopan Noot language in Victoria, is also recorded as being used in Wellington, New South Wales by local Wiradjuri people about a missionary there.

=== Animals ===
English	Wiradjuri
animal (in general)	gidyira, balugan
animal (male)	wambi
animal (female)	gunal
baby (chicken or pup)	mangga
bat	ngarradan
bat/bird (in general)	budyaan
bilby	ngundawang, bilbi, balbu, barru
brushtail possum (male)	gidyay
brush-tailed rock-wallaby	wirrang, barrbay
bunyip	waawii
butterfly	budyabudya
cattle	gurruganbalang
cockatiel	guwariyan
common wallaroo	walaruu, yulama
dingo	yugay, warragul, dinggu, dawarang, garingali (female)
dog	mirri
echidna	wandayali, wandhayirra, ganyi, ginaginbaany, guwandiyala, wambiyala
emu	dinawan
frog	gulaangga
horse	yarraman
horse (stallion)	yindaay
kangaroo (eastern grey)	wambuwuny
koala	barrandhang, gurabaan
kookaburra	gugubarra
long-nosed bandicoot	gurawang, guyand, gurang
magpie	garru
owl	ngugug
platypus	biladurang
possum	wilay
red kangaroo (female)	bandhaa
snake	gadi
sugar glider	gindaany
swan	dhundhu
quoll	mabi, babila, mugiiny-mabi
wombat	wambad

=== Family ===
English	Wiradjuri
man	gibir
woman	yinaa
mother	gunhi, ngama, baba
father	babiin, mama
son	wurrumany
sister (older)	mingaan
sister (younger)	minhi
brother (older)	gaagang
brother (younger)	gagamin
girl	migay
boy	birrany
baby	gudha
grandmother	badhiin, gunhinarrung

=== Numbers ===
English	Wiradjuri
one	ngumbaay
two	bula
three	bula ngumbaay
four	bula bula
five	marra (Note: These two words share the same meaning.)
six	marra ngumbaay
seven	marra bula
eight	marra bula ngumbaay
nine	marra bula bula
ten	marra marra

=== Anatomy ===
English	Wiradjuri
body (whole)	garraba
backside	bubul
chest	birring
eye	mil
hand	marra
testicles	buurruu, garra

=== Verbs ===
English	Wiradjuri
to dance	waganha
to dig	wangarra
to laugh	gindanha
to make fire	bangarra
to swim	bambinya
to stay	wibiyanha

=== Other ===
English	Wiradjuri
yes	ngawa
no/not	wiray
home	gunyi
money/stone	walang
left	wayburr
right	bumaldhal, bumalgala
perhaps	gada
boomerang (general term)	balgang, bargan, badhawal
but/however	gulur, ngay

=== Phrases ===
==== Introductions ====
English	Wiradjuri
What's your name?	Widyu-ndhu yuwin ngulung?
My name is James.	Yuwin ngadhi James.
Who's this one?	Ngandhi nginha?
This is mother.	Nginha gunhi.

==== Greetings ====
English	Wiradjuri
Good day!	Yiradhu marang!
Are you well?	Yamandhu marang?
Yes, I'm well.	Ngawa baladhu marang.
That's good.	Marang nganha.

Love

English	Wiradjuri
Love	Ngurrbul
I love you	Nginyugu ngurrbul
You are beautiful	Nghindu nguyaguyamilang

Complex statements

My grandfather was a law man	Moomahahdi booya doray mine
I have done my work. I am finished	Nah-du beeyunggonah gahdonbeeyay baldogoreegidahn
The world does not respect people who have no language	Moonmbinahlah nurembunggah wiray yinduhmahlah wiray myneeyungderay

== Influence on English ==
The following English words come from Wiradjuri:

- kookaburra, a species of kingfisher
- quandong, a species of tree
- quarrion (or quarrien), another name for the cockatiel

== Sources ==
- Günther, James (1892). "Grammar and Vocabulary of the Aboriginal dialect called Wirradhuri". In Fraser, John (ed.). An Australian Language. Sydney: Government printer. pp. 56–120 of appendix.
- Hale, Horatio (1846). "The languages of Australia". Ethnography and philology. Vol VI of Reports of the United States Exploring Expedition, under the command of Charles Wilkes. New York: Lea and Blanchard. pp. 457–531. ISBN 9780665356698.
- Hosking, Dianne; McNicol, Sally (1993). Wiradjuri. Panther Publishing.
- Mathews, R. H. (July–December 1904). "The Wiradyuri and Other Languages of New South Wales". The Journal of the Anthropological Institute of Great Britain and Ireland. 34: 284–305. doi:10.2307/2843103. JSTOR 2843103.
- McNicol, Sally; Hosking, Dianne (1994). "Wiradjuri". In Nick Thieberger, William McGregor (ed.). Macquarie Aboriginal Words. Sydney: Macquarie Library. pp. 79–99.
