= List of Indigenous Australians in politics and public service =

Numerous Aboriginal and Torres Strait Islander people in Australia have been notable for their contributions to politics, including participation in governments, and activism. Others are noted for their public service, generally and in specific areas like law and education. The lists of Indigenous Australians in public service, activism, law, education and humanities on this page, can never be complete and are fluid, but serve as a primer.

== Politics and government ==
By 1962–65 Aboriginal and Torres Strait Islanders were granted universal suffrage. Specifically, the Commonwealth Electoral Act 1962 gave all Aboriginal people the option of enrolling to vote in federal elections, whereas the previous Commonwealth Electoral Act 1949 gave Aboriginal people the right to vote in federal elections only if they were able to vote in their state elections. Even with the 1962 ruling, it was not until the Commonwealth Electoral Amendment Act 1983 that voting became compulsory for Aboriginal people, as it was for other Australians.

=== Vice-regal ===
Sir Douglas Nicholls was the first and so far the only Indigenous Australian Governor of an Australian state (Governor of South Australia, 1976–1977).

=== Politicians ===
There have been 52 Indigenous members of the ten Australian legislatures. Of these, 23 have been elected to the Northern Territory assembly, ten to the Australian Federal Parliament, six to the parliament of Western Australia, five to the parliament of Queensland, two each to the parliaments of Tasmania, Victoria and New South Wales, and one each to the parliament of South Australia and the Australian Capital Territory assembly. Three have served in multiple parliaments.

As of 2023, Indigenous Australian members of the Senate represented 10.5% of the 76 Senate seats, and 1.9% in the House. The total representation is, at 4.8%, proportionally far above the national population of 3.3%.

Of the 52 Indigenous Australians elected to any Australian parliament, 23 have been women.

No-one of acknowledged Aboriginal or Torres Strait Islander ancestry has yet been a member of the Norfolk Island Legislative Assembly. Norfolk Island is a part of Australia, formerly occupied briefly by Polynesian seafarers.

Ernie Bridge was the first Indigenous Australian to become a minister in a government. Neville Bonner was the first Indigenous man to become a member of the Federal Parliament, when he was appointed to fill a casual Senate vacancy in 1971. In 1972 he was the first Indigenous man to (successfully) run for an election. Pat Eatock was the first known Indigenous woman to (unsuccessfully) run for a federal election, in 1972.

Neville Perkins was the first Indigenous Leader of the Opposition in the Northern Territory, as the leader of the Labour Party from 1977–1981. Aden Ridgeway was elected to the Australian Senate in 1998 and served until 2005, and was the only First Nations person serving in Federal Parliament during this time, serving on a number of parliamentary and Senate committees. He was the first Aboriginal person to be selected as deputy leader of the Australian Democrats, and was in this role from April 2001 – October 2002. Ridgeway was the first Indigenous person to use an Indigenous language in Federal Parliament. On 25 August in 1999 in his first speech to the Senate, he stated:

"On this special occasion, I make my presence known as an Aborigine and to this chamber I say, perhaps for the first time: Nyandi baaliga Jaingatti. Nyandi mimiga Gumbayynggir. Nya jawgar yaam Gumbayynggir. Translated, it means: My father is Dhunghutti. My mother is Gumbayynggir. And, therefore, I am Gumbayynggir."

Marion Scrymgour was the first Indigenous woman to become a minister and has to date been the highest ranked Indigenous woman in a government, when she became Deputy Chief Minister of the Northern Territory from 2007 until 2009. Adam Giles was the first Indigenous Australian to lead a government as Chief Minister of the Northern Territory in 2013. Indigenous minister Kyam Maher was appointed Attorney General of South Australia in March 2022.

Pat Dixon was the first Aboriginal woman elected to local government in Australia.

Jacinta Nampijinpa Price was elected Senator for NT in May 2022 and appointed Shadow Minister for Indigenous Australians on 18 April 2023.

=== Party leaders ===
This section only includes those who held party leadership positions outside of a parliament.

Warren Mundine was the first Indigenous Australian to become National President of the Australian Labor Party.

There have been various leaders of the Australia's First Nations Political Party, however no candidate from this party has been successful in an election.

== Public servants ==
Name	Contribution	Refs
Harry Allie	Inaugural Indigenous Elder of the Australian Air Force	
Ian Anderson	AO, Former Deputy Secretary for Indigenous Affairs PM&C	
Pat Anderson	AO, Human rights advocate, Chair – Batchelor Institute of Indigenous Tertiary Education	
Robert Anderson	OAM, Chair of the Aboriginal and Torres Strait Islander Advisory Board 1999–2003	
Ross Andrews	NIAA Local & Regional Co-design Group, and Mayor of Yarrabah Aboriginal Shire Council	
Deborah Booker	Indigenous Elder of the Australian Air Force, and Board of the Institute for Aboriginal Development	
Bridget Brennan	Indigenous Affairs Editor – Australian Broadcasting Corporation	
Jody Broun	CEO – National Indigenous Australians Agency	
Peter Buckskin	PSM FACE, Commonwealth Senior Executive Service, Commissioner to UNESCO, ARC Advisory Council, Chair-NATSIHEC	
Geoff Clark	Led the Aboriginal and Torres Strait Islander Commission (ATSIC)	
Ken Colbung	AM, MBE, Chair of the Australian Institute of Aboriginal and Torres Strait Islander Studies (AIATSIS) 1984–1990	
Edwina Crawford	Director – Aboriginal Services Branch, Dept of Communities and Justice NSW	
Tanya Denning-Orman	Director–Indigenous Content NITV	
Michelle Deshong	Council Member – Australian Institute of Aboriginal and Torres Strait Islander Studies	
Rodney Dillon	Led ATSIC	
Gatjil Djerrkura	OAM, Led ATSIC	
Marcia Ella-Duncan	OAM, NIAA Senior Advisory Group, and ATSIC	
Duane Fraser	Council of Australian Institute of Aboriginal and Torres Strait Islander Studies	
Mick Gooda	Senior Advisory Group Indigenous voice to government, Aboriginal and Torres Strait Islander Social Justice Commissioner	
Steve Gordon	Ombudsman and (ATSIC) commissioner	
John Gorrie	First Aboriginal male awarded a Public Service Medal, for his contribution to public service	
Stan Grant Snr	AM for service to Indigenous education and language	
Jim Hagan	Chair National Aboriginal Conference and UN rep; first Aboriginal person to address the UN and Australian Cabinet	
Ruby Hammond	PSM, Equal opportunity achievement, Customary law and Sovereignty advocate	
Lorraine Hatton	OAM, Indigenous Elder of the Australian Army	
Leonard Hill	COO and Deputy CEO of the Australian Institute of Aboriginal and Torres Strait Islander Studies (AIATSIS)	
Letitia Hope	Deputy Chief Executive Office for Operations and Delivery at NIAA	
Paul House	NIAA Local & Regional Co-design Group, and Ngambri traditional owner Canberra	
Jackie Huggins	AM, FAHA, Key figure in reconciliation as well as literacy	
Steve Larkin	Chair – Aboriginal and Torres Strait Islander Higher Education Advisory Council (ATSIHEAC) 2009–2012, NATSIHEC, NIRAKN, CEO, Batchelor Institute Council	
Catherine Liddle	Served in Northern Territory Education Department, ABC, NITV/SBS	
Jamie Lowe	CEO – National Native Title Council	
Getano Lui Jnr	AM, NIAA Local & Regional Co-design Group, Inaugural Chair Torres Strait Regional Authority	
Shireen Malamoo	ATSIC Commissioner 1991–1993, NSW Parole Board 1994–2003	
Vonda Malone	NIAA Senior Advisory Group, and Mayor of the Torres Shire Council	
Henrietta Marrie	AM, Council of Australian Institute of Aboriginal and Torres Strait Islander Studies	
Tony McAvoy	SC, Acting Part–Time Commissioner of the NSW Land and Environment Court 2011 and 2013, Acting Northern Territory Treaty Commissioner 8 December 2021 to 30 June 2022	
Damien Miller	First Indigenous person appointed to head an Australian overseas mission – appointed Ambassador to Denmark, Norway and Iceland in 2013	
Warren Mundine	Deputy Mayor of Dubbo City, CEO of the New South Wales Native Title Service, and President of the Australian Labor Party 2006–2007	
Roy Mundine	Inaugural Indigenous Elder of the Australian Army	
Big Bill Neidjie	OAM, Eminent Gaagudju speaker and central figure in the foundation of Kakadu National Park	
Donna Odegaard	AM, Indigenous leader – business, trade and economic development, Indigenous media, National Co design group NIAA	
Vicki O'Donnell	OAM, NIAA Local & Regional Co-design Group, and WA Aboriginal Advisory Council	
Lowitja O'Donoghue	AC CBE DSG, Inaugural Chairperson ATSIC	
June Oscar	AO, Commissioner Australian Human Rights Commission	
Kirstie Parker	Director of Aboriginal Affairs and Reconciliation Government of South Australia	
Noel Pearson	Senior Advisory Group Indigenous voice to government	
Charles Perkins	AO – services to aboriginal welfare, named a National Living Treasure (Australia) in 2007	
Alitya Rigney	AO, PSM, pioneering contribution to Aboriginal education	
Lester Rigney	UN rep, Australian Ambassador for Aboriginal Education, SA Departments DEEWR; NCVER; AIATSIS; DPC; DECS, ATSIC Research Advisory Committee, ACARA Curriculum Reference Group, Co Chair Ethics council NCAFP	
Sally Riley	PSM – Head of Scripted Production at the Australian Broadcasting Corporation (ABC)	
Craig Ritchie	CEO of the Australian Institute of Aboriginal and Torres Strait Islander Studies (AIATSIS)	
Benson Saulo	Australian Consul-General to the USA (Houston) & Senior Trade and Investment Commissioner at Austrade	
Murray Saylor	Council of Australian Institute of Aboriginal and Torres Strait Islander Studies	
Marion Scrymgour	NIAA Local and Regional Co-design Group, and CEO of the Northern Land Council	
Jodie Sizer	Chair at Australian Institute of Aboriginal and Torres Strait Islander Studies Council	
Sydney Sparrow	Chair – State Aboriginal Heritage Committee South Australia 2010–2020, Ngarrindjeri Dictionary coauthor	
Sonja Stewart	Served as Deputy Commissioner of the NSW Public Service Commission and Deputy Secretary NSW Department of Premier and Cabinet	
Russell Taylor	AM, Twice Principal at Australian Institute of Aboriginal and Torres Strait Islander Studies, Senior Executive Service APS, Deputy Chair Batchelor Institute Council, 2018 NAIDOC Male Elder of the Year	
Brendan Thomas	CEO – Legal Aid NSW, and Former Deputy Secretary of the NSW Department of Communities and Justice	
Roger Thomas	South Australian Commissioner for Aboriginal Engagement, and NAIDOC Lifetime Achievement Award	
Pat Turner	AM, Senior Advisory Group Indigenous voice to government, CEO of ATSIC 1994–1998	
Ash Walker	Council of Australian Institute of Aboriginal and Torres Strait Islander Studies	
Eric Willmot	AM, Principal of the Australian Institute of Aboriginal Studies 1981–1984	
Galarrwuy Yunupingu	AM, Senior Advisory Group Indigenous voice to government	
Mandawuy Yunupingu	Centenary Medal, Order of Australia, advancement of education and social justice for Indigenous people	

== Activists ==
- Ghillar Michael Anderson
- Faith Bandler
- Mark Bin Bakar
- Daisy Bindi
- Harold Blair
- Gordon Briscoe
- Robert Bropho
- Burnum Burnum
- Kevin Buzzacott
- Joyce Clague
- Paul Coe
- Essie Coffey
- William Cooper
- Marlene Cummins
- Dexter Daniels
- Shaun Davies
- Megan Davis
- Chicka Dixon
- Mick Dodson
- Pat Dodson
- Mollie Dyer
- Gladys Elphick
- Gary Foley
- Pearl Gibbs
- Matilda House
- Jacqui Katona
- Marcia Langton
- Yami Lester
- Vincent Lingiari
- Michael Mansell
- Yvonne Margarula
- Roy Marika
- Wandjuk Marika
- Hyllus Maris
- Lambert McBride
- Bernard Namok, designer of the Torres Strait Islander flag
- John Newfong, journalist
- Oodgeroo Noonuccal
- Jack Patten
- Noel Pearson
- Phillip Waipuldanya Roberts
- Wenten Rubuntja
- Mum (Shirl) Smith
- Harold Thomas, designer of Aboriginal flag
- Margaret Tucker
- Denis Walker
- Neville Williams
- Galarrwuy Yunupingu

== Educators ==
- Ian Anderson, former Pro Vice Chancellor (University of Melbourne)
- MaryAnn Bin-Sallik, Pro Vice Chancellor, Aboriginal and Torres Strait Islander Leadership (University of Western Sydney)
- Larissa Behrendt (University of Technology Sydney)
- Tom Calma, Chancellor (University of Canberra)
- Megan Davis (University of New South Wales)
- Mick Dodson (ANU)
- Gail Garvey (Charles Darwin University)
- Stan Grant, Chair – Australian–Indigenous Belonging (Charles Sturt University)
- Jaquelyne Hughes (Charles Darwin University)
- Jackie Huggins (ANU)
- Rosalie Kunoth-Monks, former chair (Batchelor Institute of Indigenous Tertiary Education)
- Marcia Langton, Associate Provost and Foundation Chair of Australian Indigenous Studies (University of Melbourne)
- Stacy Mader (CSIRO)
- John Maynard (University of Newcastle)
- Raymattja Marika (Charles Darwin University)
- Martin Nakata, Indigenous Education and Strategy (James Cook University)
- Karlie Noon (Sydney Observatory)
- Lewis O'Brien (University of South Australia)
- Bruce Pascoe (University of Melbourne)
- Hetti Perkins (University of Melbourne)
- Lynette Riley (University of Sydney)
- Lynette Russell (Monash University)
- Kim Scott (Curtin University)
- Gracelyn Smallwood (Central Queensland University)
- Jakelin Troy, linguist and anthropologist at ANU
- Margaret Valadian
- Chelsea Watego (Queensland University of Technology)
- Eric Willmot (James Cook University)

== Lawyers and judges ==
- Larissa Behrendt – legal academic
- Bob Bellear – first indigenous judge
- Josephine Cashman – former Crown Prosecutor
- Lincoln Crowley – judge of the Supreme Court of Queensland
- Megan Davis – Constitutional Lawyer, academic
- Mick Dodson – barrister
- Sue Gordon – magistrate
- Terri Janke – Indigenous cultural intellectual property expert
- Linda Lovett – barrister
- Lloyd McDermott – first indigenous lawyer
- Hannah McGlade – human rights advocate, lawyer, and UN rep
- Matthew Myers – judge, ALRC Commissioner, academic
- Pat O'Shane – magistrate

== Humanities ==
- Pat Anderson AO (Co-Chair – Uluru Statement from the Heart)
- Muriel Bamblett (Coalition of Peaks, and Chair – SNAICC)
- Brooke Boney (Ambassador – GO Foundation)
- Linda Burney MP (Patron in Chief – GO Foundation)
- Megan Davis (Co Chair – Uluru Statement from the Heart)
- Blak Douglas (Ambassador – GO Foundation)
- Adam Goodes (Founder and Non-Executive Director – GO Foundation)
- Matilda House (Co-Founder ALS)
- Narelda Jacobs (National Indigenous Advisory Group – Football Australia)
- Mal Meninga (Co–director of Regional Economic Solutions)
- Lowitja O'Donoghue (Patron – Lowitja Institute)
- Michael O'Loughlin (Founder and Deputy Chair – GO Foundation)
- June Oscar AO (Director – Lowitja Institute, and Co Patron – Indigenous Literacy Foundation)
- Rachel Perkins (Boyer Lectures – The End of Silence)
- Dan Sultan (Ambassador – GO Foundation)
- Jared Thomas (Curator ATSI Art and Cultural Material) – South Australian Museum
- Pat Turner (Joint Council Co-Chair – Coalition of Peaks)

== See also ==
- List of Indigenous Australian politicians
- Māori politics
