= Close the Gap =

Australian social justice campaign about Indigenous health inequality

Close the Gap (CTG) is a social justice campaign focused on Indigenous Australians' health, in which peak Aboriginal and Torres Strait Islander and non-Indigenous health bodies, NGOs and human rights organisations work together to achieve health equality in Australia. The Campaign was launched in April 2007. National Close the Gap Day (NCTGD) has been held annually since 2009.

== History ==
The Close the Gap campaign arose in response to Professor Tom Calma’s Social Justice Report (2005), in which he described the social factors underlying the health inequality in Australia, and challenged governments to bring parity within a generation. In Australia, Aboriginal infants die more often than non-Indigenous infants, Aboriginal people's life expectancy is shorter, and they suffer more than double the rate of illness. Although these types of disparities exist in comparable countries such as the US and New Zealand, Australia has the worst figures.

The Steering Committee first met in March 2006. Their campaign was launched in April 2007 by patrons Catherine Freeman OAM and Ian Thorpe OAM. It began as the National Indigenous Health Equality Campaign, being formally introduced as Close the Gap in December 2007. More than 40 Indigenous and non-Indigenous health and human rights organisations collaborated to achieve health equality (measured as life expectancy) for Aboriginal and Torres Strait Islander people by 2030.

In 2007 the Council of Australian Governments (COAG) set measurable targets to track and assess developments in the health and wellbeing of Aboriginal and Torres Strait Islanders. These targets include achieving Aboriginal and Torres Strait Islander health equality within a generation and halving the mortality rate gap for children under five years old within a decade.

In February 2008, his Apology to Australia's Indigenous peoples, Prime Minister Kevin Rudd pledged the government to bridge the gap between Indigenous and Non-Indigenous Australian health, education and living conditions, in a way that respects their rights to self-determination. He also proposed to establish a commission to "close the gap" between Indigenous and non-Indigenous people in "life expectancy, educational achievement and economic opportunity".

On 20 March 2008, about a month Rudd and then Opposition Leader Brendan Nelson, signed the Close the Gap Statement of Intent at the Close the Gap Campaign’s National Indigenous Health Equality Summit. The Statement of Intent committed the government to:

- Develop a comprehensive, long-term plan of action, targeted to need, evidence-based and capable of addressing the existing inequalities in health services, in order to achieve equality of health status and life expectancy between Aboriginal and Torres Strait Islander peoples and non-Indigenous Australians by 2030.
- Ensure the full participation of Aboriginal and Torres Strait Islander peoples and their representative bodies in all aspects of addressing their health needs.

The Statement of Intent became the point of reference for the Close the Gap campaign.

Over the years, a number of prominent Indigenous leaders have co-chaired the campaign, including:

- Jody Broun, also a co-chair of the National Congress of Australia's First Peoples, and Mick Gooda, Aboriginal and Torres Strait Islander Social Justice Commissioner, in 2013;
- Kirstie Parker, who also co-chaired of the National Congress of Australia’s First Peoples, and Mick Gooda, in 2014;
- Jackie Huggins, also co-chair for the National Congress of Australia’s First Peoples, and Pat Turner AM, CEO of the National Aboriginal Community Controlled Health Organisation, in 2017.

== Description ==
As of 2020 the co-chairs of Close the Gap are June Oscar AO, Commissioner of Aboriginal and Torres Strait Islander Social Justice, and Rod Little, who co-chaired the National Congress of Australia's First Peoples for many years.

Member organisations include:

- Australian Healthcare and Hospitals Association
- ANTaR
- Australian College of Midwives
- Australian College of Nursing
- Australian College of Rural and Remote Medicine
- Australian Human Rights Commission (Secretariat)
- Australian Indigenous Doctors' Association
- Australian Medical Association
- Australian Physiotherapy Association
- beyondblue
- Congress of Aboriginal and Torres Strait Islander Nurses and Midwives
- First Peoples Disability Network
- Healing Foundation
- Heart Foundation
- Indigenous Allied Health Australia
- Kidney Health Australia
- Menzies School of Health Research
- Oxfam Australia
- Public Health Association of Australia
- Reconciliation Australia
- Royal Australasian College of Physicians
- Royal Australian College of General Practitioners
- Fred Hollows Foundation
- Lowitja Institute
- Pharmacy Guild of Australia
- Torres Strait Regional Authority

As of March 2020, almost 200,000 Australians had pledged support.

== Publications ==
Close the Gap has produced 11 reports, including a 10-year review in 2018.

== Closing the Gap ==
The Australian government adopted the goals of Close the Gap in 2008, in a strategy known as Closing the Gap, and in 2009 committed to making an annual progress report to Parliament on progress with the Closing the Gap strategy.

In 2020, the Closing the Gap framework and strategy was significantly overhauled, with a "greater focus on partnership between governments and Aboriginal and Torres Strait Islander people".

Each year, the Close the Gap Steering Committee publishes a report detailing the Government's progress in achieving its targets.
