= Caroline Archer =

Australian Aboriginal activist

- Born: 22 February 1922; Cherbourg Aboriginal reserve, Queensland, Australia
- Died: 8 December 1979 (aged 57); Coonabarabran
- Occupations: Activist, telephonist
- Spouse: Frederick Archer
- Parents: Norman Brown (father); Lillian Fogarty (mother)
- Awards: Queen Elizabeth II Silver Jubilee Medal

Caroline Lillian Archer (22 February 1922 – 8 December 1978) was an Aboriginal Australian activist and telephonist.

Archer was born in the Aboriginal reserve in Cherbourg, Queensland to a white father and an Aboriginal mother. Archer grew up under the supervision of the Queensland Department of Native Affairs, experiencing malnutrition as a child resulting in permanent limp and ongoing health problems.

After finishing school, Archer became a domestic servant to a supportive employer at 14. She was permitted exemption from the Acts which regulated Aborigines and restricted the rights of Aboriginal Australians – this freedom was rarely granted.

Archer became Brisbane's first Aboriginal person to operate a trunk line switchboard as a public servant.

In 1951, she married an English-born aircraftsman and photographer; they had a son and two daughters. She opened and ran a gift shop in Surfers Paradise called Jedda, named after the protagonist of the film of the same name, where she sold indigenous artefacts, crafts, and art obtained directly from indigenous sources.

Her activism involved the patenting of Australian Aboriginal culture against cultural exploitation. She later joined the One People of Australia League (OPAL), where she held the position of executive officer (1974), and eventually became state president of the organisation. In 1978, Archer joined the Department of Aboriginal Affairs in Canberra, with her responsibilities including the education of Canberra schoolchildren in indigenous culture.

== Early life ==
Caroline Archer was born at the Aboriginal reserve in Cherbourg, Queensland, the daughter of Norman Brown and her Aboriginal mother Lillian Masso, later Fogarty. Caroline's mother was sent to jail and then was sent with Caroline's family from the Charters Towers region to Cherbourg when she refused to allow its members to be separated and the boys assigned to cattle-stations.

As a child she suffered from malnutrition and her health remained poor as she incurred a childhood accident leaving her with a limp. Archer was raised under the supervision of the Queensland Department of Native Affairs which segregated people of Aboriginal descent on reserves. The Queensland Department of Native Affairs was established in 1939 under the Aboriginals Preservation and Protection Act 1939 and was "responsible for the welfare of Queensland's Aboriginal population who were deemed to be State Wards" (Butterworth, 2014).

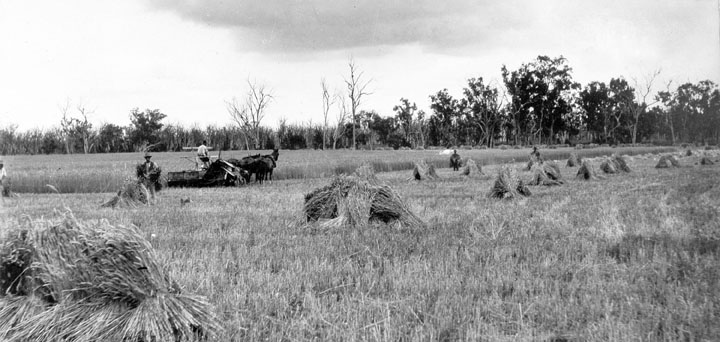
Inglewood, Queensland

Archer was educated at the reserve school to fourth grade, a level considered sufficient for an Aboriginal girl. Archer's school followed the special syllabus for Queensland Aboriginal schools, with emphasis on manual training and content equivalent to fourth grade in the State's primary schools. "In the years prior to the 1967 referendum, many Australians had realised that on the whole there were very poor levels of education existing for Aboriginal and Torres Strait Islander people". At fourteen, Archer was employed in domestic service by the Kay family at Whetstone station near Inglewood, Queensland, where she was paid the equivalent of a white worker's wage not the less amount prescribed for Aboriginal servants as well as encouraged to continue her education.

== Career ==
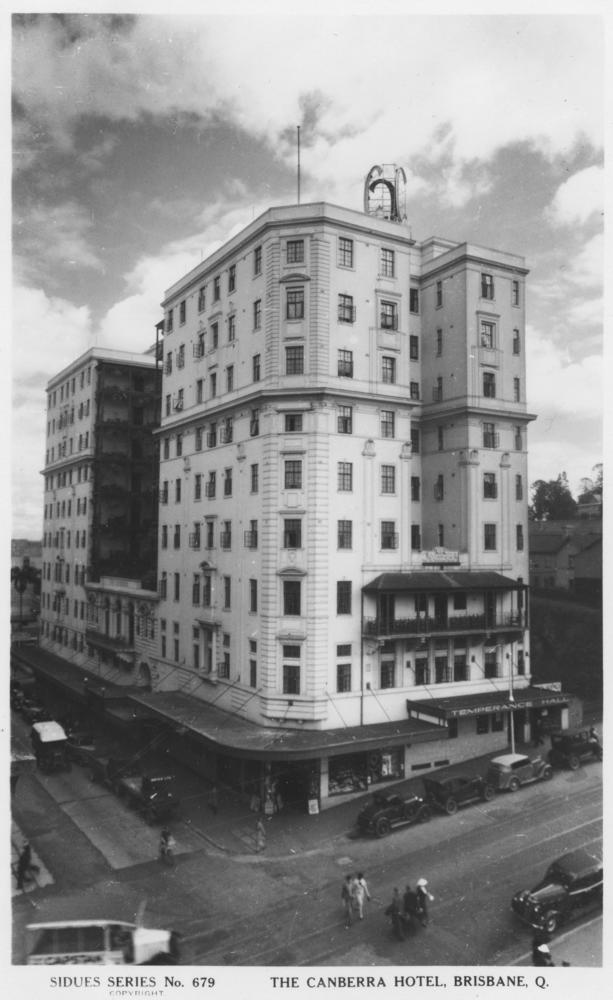
Canberra Hotel, Brisbane, ca. 1939

After working as a domestic servant for the Kay family, Archer moved to Brisbane and worked in a private home. She then worked at the Canberra Hotel from 1935 to 1949 where she learned to operate the telephone switchboard. In 1950, she was employed as a PMG switchboard operator. In Brisbane, Archer was the city's first Aboriginal person to operate a trunkline switchboard as a public servant. By the force of her own efforts, she was able to gain full citizen's rights by obtaining an exemption from the Acts regulating Aborigines; official approval was based on an examination of the applicant's conduct and standard of living.

Archer developed a particular interest in teaching both white Australians and younger Aboriginal people an appreciation for Aboriginal culture. Archer later opened and ran a gift shop in Surfers Paradise, Queensland, called Jedda, named after the protagonist of the 1955 film Jedda by Charles Chauvel, where she sold indigenous artefacts, crafts, and arts obtained directly from indigenous sources. Archer opened and ran this shop in order to provide an incentive for the practice of crafts and a training ground in business skills for young Aborigines as Archer believed in the need to patent Aboriginal arts, crafts, and designs to avoid commercial imitations.

== Activism ==
Archer took an interest in reviving the Miss OPAL Quest and conducted a deportment course for Aboriginal models. The Miss Opal quest had initially been popular, with the winner entering the Warana festival quest, but interest had fallen away. An unsuccessful candidate for the Nation Aboriginal Consultative Committee in 1973, "Archer was consciously 'middle of the road' in her views; she had little regard for radical solutions to racial issues and referred to herself as an Australian first and then an Aborigine.”

Archer's activism involved the patenting of Australian Aboriginal culture against cultural exploitation. Archer joined the One People of Australia League (OPAL) – a multi-racial organization founded "to weld the Coloured and White Citizens of Australia into one People". OPAL was a non-political organisation established in Brisbane in 1961 and ran institutions in Queensland that housed children and provided a support service and social meeting place for Aboriginal people. One People of Australia League aimed to help raise the living and education standards of Indigenous Australians living outside of the missions and reserves. It was run by both European and Indigenous Australians. As state president of OPAL she travelled interstate to federal conferences and to lobby politicians. Archer later became the first Aboriginal executive officer of OPAL in 1974 and eventually became State president of the organisation.

Archer's deep concern for improved race relations led her to work for the Queensland Department of Education and later for the Department of Aboriginal Affairs in 1978, where she worked as an Education Consultant on Aboriginal culture. Archer worked in Canberra where she addressed schools and other groups on aspects of Aboriginal culture. As the Queensland Department of Education allowed her to visit schools, she would ask the children to consider how people who could survive in the bush must have had some way of passing on the knowledge.

== Recognition ==
In August 1977, Archer was awarded the Queen Elizabeth II Silver Jubilee Medal for her contributions to the community.

== Personal life ==
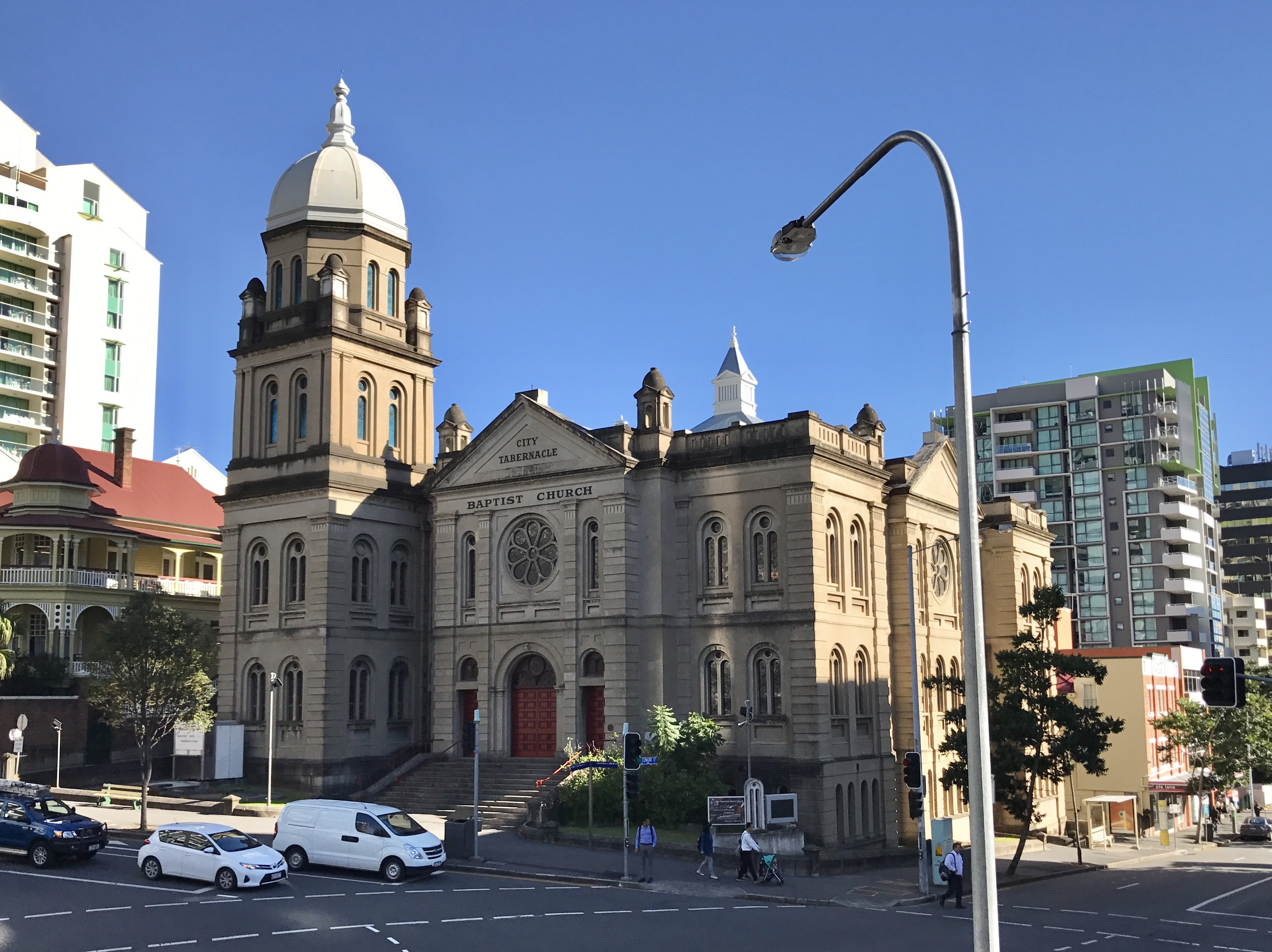
Baptist City Tabernacle, Brisbane, Queensland

On 29 December 1951, at the Baptist City Tabernacle she married Frederick Archer, an English-born aircraftsman and photographer. They had two daughters and a son.

Archer died on 8 December 1978 in Coonabarabran New South Wales, from injuries sustained in a motorcar accident. She was returning to her home in Brisbane for Christmas from Narrabri at the time of the accident with her husband, son, and two daughters who survived the incident. She was cremated.

== See also ==
- Joyce Wilding (1909–1978), English-born activist for indigenous rights in Queensland
- Caroline Tennant-Kelly (1899–1989), English-born activist for indigenous rights and anthropologist, working i.a. in Cherbourg
- Jackie Huggins (born 1956), Bidjara/Pitjara, Birri Gubba and Juru woman, author and Aboriginal rights activist
