= Redfern Park Speech =

1992 speech by Australian Prime Minister Paul Keating

Paul Keating delivering the speech

The Redfern Park Speech, also known as the Redfern speech or Redfern address, was made on 10 December 1992 by then-prime minister of Australia, Paul Keating, at Redfern Park, which is in Redfern, an inner city suburb of Sydney, New South Wales. The speech dealt with the challenges faced by Indigenous Australians; both Aboriginal Australian and Torres Strait Islander peoples. It is remembered as one of the most powerful speeches in Australian history, both for its rhetorical eloquence and for its groundbreaking admission of the negative impact of white settlement in Australia on its Indigenous peoples, culture and society, in the first acknowledgement by the Australian Government of the dispossession of its First Peoples. It has been described as "a defining moment in the nation's reconciliation with its Aboriginal and Torres Strait Islander people".

The spirit and name of Keating's Redfern speech was invoked by the Redfern Statement, a policy statement from a large group of Indigenous bodies issued on 9 June 2016, shortly before the 2016 Australian federal election. Among other things, the statement called for the creation of a new dedicated department to deliver programs for Indigenous advancement.

== Background and description ==
The speech was delivered by Keating on 10 December 1992, just under a year into his term as Prime Minister of Australia, to a crowd of predominantly Indigenous people gathered at Redfern Park, in Redfern, Sydney. It was given to launch the International Year for the World's Indigenous People (1993).

Keating's choice of location was significant; Redfern had been the centre of Aboriginal (or more specifically, Koori) culture and activism in Sydney for decades. The speech came only six months after the Australian High Court's historic Mabo decision, which had overturned as legal fiction the claim of Australia when it was first discovered by Europeans as a terra nullius, recognising native title in Australia. The speech reflected the shift in thinking, and used words reflecting partnership and reconciliation; ultimately it reflected a changing official interpretation of Australia's history.

Keating was the first Australian prime minister to publicly acknowledge to Indigenous Australians that European settlers were responsible for the difficulties Australian Aboriginal communities continued to face: "It was we who did the dispossessing", he said. "We took the traditional lands and smashed the traditional way of life. We brought the diseases and the alcohol." He went on: "We committed the murders. We took the children from their mothers. We practised discrimination and exclusion. It was our ignorance and our prejudice. And our failure to imagine that these things could be done to us".

The speech became known as the "Redfern speech", and is now regarded by many as one of the greatest Australian speeches.

Don Watson, then Keating's principal speechwriter, later claimed authorship of the speech, although Keating has disputed this. Watson wrote about the creation of the speech in his 2002 memoir, Recollections of a Bleeding Heart: A Portrait of Paul Keating PM.

== Legacy ==
Keating's speech has been described as "a defining moment in the nation's reconciliation with its Aboriginal and Torres Strait Islander people", being the first ever public acknowledgement by the Commonwealth Government of the dispossession of the country's First Nations peoples.

In 2007, ABC Radio National listeners voted the speech as their third most unforgettable speech, behind Martin Luther King Jr.'s 1963 speech "I Have a Dream" (number one) and Jesus' Sermon on the Mount (number two).

Keating's speech was the first stepping stone for a later Labor Prime Minister, Kevin Rudd, to offer a formal apology to Indigenous Australians for past government practices and policies, delivered in Canberra in February 2008.

The Redfern Address was added to the National Film and Sound Archive's Sounds of Australia registry in 2010.

In 2019, the Australian electronic musician Paul Mac sampled the speech in the track "Redfern Address (In Memory of Vision)" on his album Mesmerism.

Sol Bellear said in 2017 that he believed the speech "would have to be one of the most brilliant speeches ever, in Australia, if not the southern hemisphere." On the 30th anniversary of the speech in 2022, The Guardian released interviews with Stan Grant, Larissa Behrendt and other Indigenous public and media figures who witnessed the speech on its lasting impact.

=== Redfern Statement ===
Referencing Keating's Redfern Speech, a policy statement from a large group of Indigenous bodies was issued on 9 June 2016, in the run-up to the 2016 Australian election, was dubbed the Redfern Statement. It represented growing calls for Aboriginal and Torres Strait Islander autonomy, and policy informed by grassroots organisations. The manifesto was authored by 18 organisations, including the Lowitja Institute and the Healing Foundation. It was supported by the Close the Gap committee, Amnesty International Australia, the Australian Medical Association, the Law Council of Australia, Reconciliation Australia, Save the Children Australia, the Fred Hollows Foundation, ANTaR and many other large and smaller organisations. The group called for the creation of a new dedicated department to deliver programs for Indigenous advancement.

The Redfern Statement united leading members of the National Congress of Australia’s First Peoples from across key sectors, and had helped to grow an alliance of supporters. In September 2016, coinciding with the start of the 45th Australian Parliament, a gathering of Aboriginal and Torres Strait Islander leaders, including all Aboriginal and Torres Strait Islander MPs and Senators, outside Parliament House, Canberra, highlighted the importance of supporting the Redfern Statement. On 14 February 2017, Dr Jackie Huggins, who chairs the Close the Gap campaign, gave the statement to Prime Minister Malcolm Turnbull, Opposition Leader Bill Shorten, and the leader of the Australian Greens, Richard Di Natale, ahead of the 9th Closing the Gap Report to Parliament.

== See also ==
- Closing the gap
- List of speeches
- National Sorry Day
- Reconciliation Australia
- Minister for Indigenous Australians
