= Rita Huggins =

Australian Indigenous activist

Rita Cynthia Huggins née Holt (10 August 1921 – 27 August 1996) was an Aboriginal Australian activist. She worked with One People of Australia League during the 1960s, and is the subject of a biography, Auntie Rita, co-written with her daughter Jackie Huggins and published in 1994.

== Early life and education ==
Rita Cynthia Holt (later Huggins) was born on 10 August 1921, at Carnarvon Gorge, Queensland, the daughter of Albert and Rose Holt. They were of the Bidjara-Pitjara lands which encompasses part of the Carnarvon National Park. At an early age she and her siblings were separated from their extended family due to the official government policy at the time. Rita, her parents and some of her siblings went to live at Cherbourg Aboriginal Reserve, in Barambah if they had light skin colour, while others were sent to Wooribinda if they had dark skin colour.

She lived with her parents and attended school at Cherbourg from age 8-13, and then was removed to the girls dormitory.

== 1930s-1940s: domestic service ==
In 1934, Huggins was sent into domestic service by the government, working on a property outside Charleville. She worked for the Semple family, who had been in charge at Cherbourg when they moved to Brisbane from 1941. She fell pregnant with her first child in 1942 and her daughter, Marion or Mutoo, returned to live with her parents at Cherbourg, while she continued in service.

In 1947, Rita fell pregnant with her second child, Gloria and after the government granted her an exemption to move, she relocated to Mackay where she lived with friends Lear Barber and Ted Ram Chandra and worked for a doctor's family. Homesick for her family, she returned to Cherbourg in 1950.

== 1950s: marriage to Jack Huggins ==
Rita met soldier John "Jack" Huggins during World War II when she was 18 and working in Brisbane. They married in 1951 and lived in Ayr, where he worked in the post office. They had three children together - Ngaire, Jackie and John. Jack died suddenly in 1958. Huggins moved her family to Brisbane where she took up employment again in addition to some support from Jack Huggins' superannuation fund and war pension.

== 1960s-1980s ==
=== One People of Australia League ===
After Huggins relocated to Brisbane in 1960, she became involved with the One People of Australia League (OPAL) a non-political organisation, which had formed in Brisbane in 1961, to help raise the living and educational standards of Indigenous Australians living outside of the missions and reserves. It was run by both European and Indigenous Australians. OPAL ran a hostel in South Brisbane, which Huggins and her family lived in before their move to a house in Inala. She became involved in the administration of OPAL, in particular the holiday camps, balls and dances as well as the fundraising and public speaking efforts.

She was involved with the lobbying that OPAL took for the 1967 referendum. Much of the administration of OPAL was run from Huggins home, and she became director of OPAL for over 20 years, as they sought funding to establish the OPAL Joyce Wilding home, the Murri School at Acacia Ridge and the wider Indigenous community.

=== Home life and other work ===
She found a place to stay in Inala, but alcoholism and financial hardship forced the family into temporary accommodation from 1969 to 1972. Friends offered her their farm in The Gap in which to live and they moved there between 1972 and 1987.

Huggins took up research work for the University of Queensland in 1973 looking into Aboriginal education in Queensland and the Northern Territory.

Upon her return to Brisbane she found that the younger children, who had been left in the care of their elder sister, Gloria, had all been in a car accident. Gloria was killed in the accident and many of the children seriously injured. Huggins took in Gloria's children in 1976.

== Death and legacy ==
Huggins died on 27 August 1996, in Brisbane, and was celebrated at a funeral of over 1000 people. She was survived by her children and grandchildren.

The story of her life was written with her daughter Jackie Huggins, and Lillian Holt and published in 1994 – Auntie Rita. The book won the Stanner Award. An extract of this book is included in the Anthology of Australian Aboriginal literature.
