= Muriel Langford =

British/Australian missionary and community worker (1913–2003)

Muriel Langford (1913 – 9 January 2003) was a British/Australian missionary and community worker for the Australian Aboriginal community in Queensland.

== Early life ==
Muriel Elsie Webb (later Langford) was born in West Ham, Essex, England, in 1913. After the completion of high school she worked in a factory, in addition to training as a secretary. She attended Derby Road Methodist Church where she met Bernard Langford. They married in Essex in 1936. They were both Conscientious Objectors who struggled with discrimination during World War II. Langford saw an advertisement for hospital managers to volunteer in India and she and Bernard took up this role from 1944 to 1955, whilst rearing their own four children. While there Muriel gained fluency in Hindi, Telugu and French.

== Move to Australia ==
In 1955, the Langfords moved to Australia, where Bernard Langford served as an Anglican minister in Devonport, Tasmania. They moved to Queensland in 1957 and her husband became the Queensland Secretary for the Council of Churches. It was at this time she became aware of the work of Joyce Wilding who was establishing a hostel in Brisbane for Aboriginal people. Langford became involved with the work of QCAATSI in the late 1950s before becoming involved with the establishment of the One People of Australia League (OPAL) in 1961. Langford worked alongside Joyce Wilding, Kathie Cochrane, Oodgeroo Noonuccal, Rita Huggins, Sylvia Cairns and May McBride as they developed programs which provided networks of support for Indigenous families who had moved to Brisbane. OPAL programs included the development of homework classes, holiday camps, housing and job related support. In 1962, Wilding, Langford and Cairns helped to establish a hostel which was named OPAL House in South Brisbane, as a hostel for families who had moved to Brisbane for work but were unable to find housing.

As part of the activism going on for the 1967 referendum, Langford visited editors of newspapers, spoke on television and met with staff of government departments to lobby for greater support of the work of OPAL in breaking down barriers to education and training. In 1970, Langford and Wilding were successful in acquiring a former motel in the Brisbane suburb of Upper Mount Gravatt to provide a home for Aboriginal children. This housing complex was called the Joyce Wilding OPAL Home. Senator Neville Bonner, the then president of OPAL and his wife Heather were married from OPAL House in 1972. She helped lobby for the establishment of the Aboriginal and Islander Independent Community School in 1986.

Langford graduated with a BA from the University of Queensland in 1978, at age 65, in French and Anthropology and worked for the Queensland Canegrowers Council as an editor. She published a book with Malcom Thomis, Rocky point and the Heck Family : 100 years of sugar milling in south-east Queensland (1979). After a number of years of ill health, she died on 9 January 2003. She was survived by her children.

== Memberships ==
Langford was a member of the Religious Society of Friends, also known as the Quakers.
