= Australians for Native Title and Reconciliation =

Australian organisation which advocates for Indigenous rights

ANTAR (formerly Australians for Native Title and Reconciliation) is an independent, national non-government, not-for-profit, community-based organisation founded in 1997 which advocates for the rights of Aboriginal and Torres Strait Islander people in Australia and aims to help overcome inequality and disadvantage. Its staff and membership comprise mainly non-Indigenous people who support Indigenous voices and interests. Since 2023, ANTAR has had a majority First Nations board of directors.

== History ==
ANTaR was founded in 1997. with co-founder Phil Glendinning remaining National President of the organisation for 10 years.

ANTaR was a key supporter and leader in the movement for reconciliation in Australia, which was rooted in the recognition that Indigenous Australians were not being fairly treated in Australia. During the development of the Native Title Act 1993, a number of non-Indigenous organisations and individuals developed a coalition to support Indigenous interests in negotiations about the Act. Following the election of the Howard government, in early 1997 the National Indigenous Working Group on Native Title (NIWG), which consisted of representatives of Aboriginal land councils and equivalent organisations across Australia, called on NGOs around the nation to gauge the level of non-Indigenous support for Australian native title rights. The ANTaR coalition grew out of this.

Somewhat differently to most other such movements, ANTaR has not sought to speak for Indigenous Australians; rather, it aims to support Indigenous voices and interests, seeking direction from Indigenous peoples on issues such as policy and legislation that affects them. When the Howard government was introducing amendments to the Native Title Act, NIWG provided the national view and ANTaR helped to coordinate a response to the amendments. In 1997 and 1998, native title rights became the focus of a national campaign by ANTaR, with a central project called the Sea of Hands. This was a visual display, with an accompanying statement for which citizens' signatures were collected. The focus shifted after Howard's 1998 amendments to the Act, and the Sea of Hands became recognised as a symbol for reconciliation.

In 2014 Andrew Meehan was appointed as national director of ANTaR. In 2017 he said that ANTaR's main priorities were: Aboriginal and Torres Strait Islander health equality, particularly through the Close the Gap campaign; the high levels of incarceration; addressing family violence ("Change the Record" campaign); racism; federal funding for services and programs; proper engagement by government with First Peoples (through the Redfern Statement group); and educating the broader community about reconciliation, through ANTaR's "Sea of Hands" program. Meehan was no longer director as of February 2019.

From January 2019, ANTaR took over the running of the National Close the Gap Day (NCTGD), after Oxfam Australia had run the event on behalf of the CTG coalition for the previous 10 years. Most of the March 2020 NCTGD public events were cancelled owing to the COVID-19 pandemic in Australia, but ANTaR co-hosted the launch of the 2019 Close the Gap report – Our Choices, Our Voices, prepared by the Lowitja Institute, at a community event at Tharawal Aboriginal Corporation in Sydney. June Oscar AO, Aboriginal and Torres Strait Islander Social Justice Commissioner and Rod Little, Co-Chair of the National Congress of Australia's First Peoples, addressed attendees.

With the 2020 upsurge in Black Lives Matter issues and rallies, including rallies across the country in early June, ANTaR was cited by GQ magazine as one of 12 organisations across the country to donate to, to aid the cause of Indigenous justice.

In 2022, after more than 25 years advocating for First Nations rights and justice, Australians for Native Title and Reconciliation rebranded as ANTAR to reflect its broader mission.

At the 2023 Annual General Meeting, ANTAR’s Board became majority First Nations for the first time.

== Description ==
ANTAR is a national network of private individuals, both Indigenous and non-Indigenous, and other organisations, and engages in public campaigns, lobbying and various other forms of advocacy. It has relationships with Aboriginal and Torres Strait Islander leadership who provide feedback and direction. It conducts campaigns on a national as well as grassroots level, with local ANTaR groups. It operates from its headquarters in Surry Hills, New South Wales**.

The organisation's 2020 financial statement showed that about 91% of its total gross income was derived from donations and bequests.

== Governance ==
As of October 2021, Paul Wright was the National Director, and Dr Peter Lewis was chair of the board of eight members.

In March 2024, Blake Alan Cansdale, a proud Anaiwan man, succeeded Paul Wright as National Director, becoming ANTAR’s first Aboriginal National Director.

In November 2024, Des Rogers, a Pertame man, was elected President, replacing Dr Peter Lewis and becoming the organisation’s first Indigenous President.

== See also ==
- Reconciliation in Australia
