= Catherine Liddle =

Australian executive and Indigenous health advocate

- Born: Australia
- Occupations: Executive, journalist, advocate
- Known for: CEO of SNAICC – National Voice for our Children

Catherine Liddle is an Aboriginal Australian executive, journalist, and advocate of Indigenous Australians' health. As of August 2024 she is CEO of SNAICC – National Voice for our Children, and member of the Coalition of Peaks.

== Early life and education ==
Catherine Liddle is of Arrernte and Luritja heritage (from Central Australia).

She has said that "Aunty Pat" (Pat Turner) was the reason that her mother went to university in Adelaide.

== Career ==
Liddle's primary occupation has been as a journalist, but she has occupied many managerial roles. She worked in a number of roles at Imparja Television, the ABC, SBS, and NITV, including executive editor of news and current affairs. She also worked in managerial positions at the NT Department of Education.

In 2019, while NPY Regional Director of Jawun (formerly Jawun Indigenous Corporate Partnerships) in Alice Springs, Liddle acted as interim general manager of Indigenous Community Television for five months. She was appointed CEO of First Nations Media Australia from October 2019. She has also had experience in working with the Coalition of Peaks, which liaises with governments on achieving the targets of the national Closing the Gap strategy. She stood in for Pat Turner, along with Scott Wilson, in leading the Joint Council on Closing the Gap in her absence, as acting lead convenor of the Coalition of Peaks in early 2024.

She was appointed CEO of SNAICC – National Voice for Our Children, the national peak body for Aboriginal and Torres Strait Islander children, commencing 8 February 2021, and is as of August 2024 still in the position. She said upon the appointment:

A particular focus will be the work being carried out as part of the Coalition of Peaks, ensuring we are partners in the decisions taken at all levels of government that directly impact on our children and our futures. If we are to close gaps in disadvantage, consideration of the impact on our children must be front and centre when policies and programs are developed and implemented. We can only do this when First Nations people and organisations are driving the decisions.

== Other activities ==
In 2020, Liddle was one of the senior journalists on the judging panel for the Walkley Awards.

In August 2021, she was appointed to the board of Girls from Oz (G-Oz), which aims "to improve educational and employment outcomes for girls and young women in remote parts of Australia" through delivering performing arts programs to female school students of all ages, and awarding successful applicants travel programs to capital cities, where they are offered further opportunities.

In 2022 Liddle was appointed to the board of the Menzies Foundation.

In April 2023, Liddle was a keynote speaker at the Melbourne School of Population and Global Health's inaugural Gathering the Seeds Symposium in Perth, Western Australia. In May of that year, she participated in an event ahead of the referendum about the Indigenous Voice to Parliament, entitled "Conversations about the Voice", hosted by the Centre for Comparative Constitutional Studies at the Melbourne Law School, along with Monique Ryan, Terry Moran, and former clerk of the Australian Senate Rosemary Laing.

In July 2023, she delivered the Renate Kamener Oration at the University of Melbourne's Ormond College. This event raises funds for the Renate Kamener Indigenous Scholarship at the university. In December 2023, she was a keynote speaker at the 12th OMEP Asia-Pacific Conference at Macquarie University in Sydney. (Note: Organisation Mondiale pour l'Education Prescolaire, or World Organisation for Early Childhood Education.)

She is a member of the Monash University Indigenous Advisory Council, an advisory body to the university on Indigenous matters.

She has been interviewed on radio regarding Indigenous education and childcare.
