= Winanga-Li Aboriginal Child and Family Centre =

Aboriginal child and family centre in New South Wales, Australia

- Abbreviation: Winanga-Li
- Formation: 2013
- Type: Aboriginal child and family centre
- Headquarters: Gunnedah, New South Wales, Australia
- Region served: North-western New South Wales
- Services: Early childhood education, family support, language and cultural programs
- Website: www.winanga-li.org.au

Winanga-Li Aboriginal Child and Family Centre is an Aboriginal child and family centre based in Gunnedah, New South Wales, Australia, on Gamilaraay (Kamilaroi) Country. Officially opened in 2013, it was the first of nine Aboriginal Child and Family Centres established in New South Wales under a Closing the Gap initiative. The centre provides integrated early childhood education and child and family support services, including language and cultural programs for Aboriginal and non-Aboriginal families. Its name is taken from a Gamilaraay expression meaning “hear, listen, know, remember”.

== History ==
Winanga-Li was officially opened in July 2013. The Productivity Commission later described it as an integrated service for the people of Gunnedah and reported that Gunnedah had been selected because of a high proportion of young mothers and relatively low use of early childhood services. The Commission also reported that the centre's service management had passed to a local Aboriginal Board of Management by July 2014.

== Programs and services ==
A 2014 Productivity Commission report described Winanga-Li as an integrated service centre providing care and education for children from newborn to five years old, alongside health and support services for children and families, including support for families of children with disabilities. The same report stated that around 70 per cent of children attending the centre were Indigenous and that most educators were Indigenous, contributing to community engagement and employment outcomes.

Architecture Bulletin wrote that the centre provides early-start diagnosis with access to specialist services, as well as parent education, family support, health programs, cultural programs and referrals. It also reported that the childcare centre was open to the general public while incorporating traditional language and culture. In 2020, ABC News reported that the centre provided child care and early education to Indigenous and non-Indigenous children up to five years old and that 97 per cent of staff came from an Aboriginal background.

== Language revitalisation ==
Winanga-Li has been involved in Gamilaraay language revitalisation through the Yaama Gamilaraay early childhood language project. ANU reported in 2021 that linguists had worked with colleagues at Winanga-Li on Gamilaraay language renewal since 2016 and that the centre was a partner organisation in the Gamilaraay Voices project.

Massey University reported in 2019 that five children's books—the first bilingual early readers in Gamilaraay—were launched in Gunnedah as part of the Yaama Gamilaraay! project, which was funded through the New South Wales Department of Education's Ninganah No More program.

== Architecture and recognition ==
Architecture Bulletin described the Gunnedah centre as part of a New South Wales Government Architect's Office program for Aboriginal Child and Family Centres. It reported that the centre won the year's Blacket Prize and that its plan drew on the Wallaby Trap landscape beneath Porcupine Hill, with a yarning circle and a central community hub linking childcare and family health facilities.

In 2021, the University of Sydney reported that the Winanga-Li project was on exhibition in the Australian Pavilion at the 2021 Venice Architecture Biennale.

== See also ==
- Closing the Gap
- Gamilaraay
- Gunnedah, New South Wales
