= Jack O'Chin =

(1917–1978) Aboriginal community leader and rugby league footballer

Andrew O'Chin, known primarily as Jack O'Chin, (28 August 1917 - 24 August 1978) was an Aboriginal community leader and rugby league football player who spent much of his life in Cherbourg, Queensland.

He was a member of the Cherbourg Community Council for many years and served on numerous Queensland Government committees including the Queensland Citizens’ Committee for the Captain Cook Bicentenary and the Relics Advisory Committee to the Department of Aboriginal and Islander Affairs.

== Early life ==
O'Chin was born a Hughenden, a small town in Queensland, and was the son of an Aboriginal-Chinese father, Charlie O'Chin who worked as a labourer and his mother was Topsy Mitchell, who was also known as 'Katie O'Chin' or 'Daisy King', a Guwa woman. As a small child O'Chin was taken, alnogside his mother, to Barambah Aboriginal Reserve (which later became Cherbourg Aboriginal Settlement) where he was placed in a boys dormitory away from her. She died soon afterwards and with overcrowding in the dormitories O'Chin was moved so as to be cared for his extended family within the reserve. These family members included his aunt Tottie Clements and, later, her mother Zoe Button. He was later fostered by Lizzie Thomas.

At Barambah O'Chin was only able to attend school until year four and on 26 January 1930, at the age of 13, he begun training working at the manual training workshop where he learned carpentry, joinery, and plumbing.

During this period, when still a teenager he began playing both cricket and rugby league. Rugby league was his primary passion and, from the 1930s to the 1950s, he played for The Rovers, a local team and was nicknamed 'magic fingers'. In 1937, was described as ‘the best full-back in the country’.

== Career ==
After completing his training O'Chin primarily worked as a carpenter and remained at Cherborg except for a brief period spent cutting sugar can near Ingham during World War II and another brief period at Woorabinda Aboriginal Settlement.

In 1945 O'Chin began to take a leadership position within his community when he joined the Cherbourg Welfare Association, of which he was a foundation member. As a part of his membership he took an active interest in all part of community life including activities and became the operator of the communities movie projector and performed as an actor and musician in numerous events.

During the 1950s O'Chin also campaigned for the increased recognition and support for Aboriginal arts and artists and, as a part of this, helped establish an artefact industry within the community which included a boomerang factory.

On 26 May 1966 he was elected to the newly established Cherbourg Community Council which he would remain on for the following 12 years as well as being their first chair. In this same period he begun attending the local church, run by the Aborigines Inland Mission, and, amongst other activities, later served as a deacon and preacher.

Between 1966 and 1969 O'Chin was the chair of the consultative committee of Aboriginal councils, which would later become the Queensland Aboriginal Advisory Council. He was also a part of the Queensland Citizens’ Committee for the Captain Cook Bicentenary and the Relics Advisory Committee to the Department of Aboriginal and Islander Affairs.

On 20 January 1978 he was awarded a Imperial Service Medal following his retirement.

== Later life and death ==
O'Chin died on 24 August 1978 at Cherbourg and is buried there.

== Personal life ==
On 10 September 1936 O'Chin married Lorna Loder and they would go on to have five children together. Loder died in 1952 and, that same year, on 22 September 1951, he married Nellie Cobbo and they would have twelve further children together.

It was also widely known that O'Chin had fathered other children that were recognised within the community as his children.

== Legacy ==
The Jack O'Chin Oval, at Cherbourg, is named for him.

In 2011 a boomerang made by O'Chin in the 1930s or 1940s was purchased by the Queensland Museum. This boomerang features the images and names of two Aboriginal sportsmen Frank Fisher and Eddie Gilbert to honour them.
