= Peter Read (historian) =

Australian historian (born 1945

Peter John Read AM FASSA (born 1945) is an Australian historian specialising in the history of Indigenous Australians. Read worked as a teacher and civil servant before co-founding Link-Up. Link-Up was an organisation that reunited Aboriginal families who had undergone forcible separation of children from their families through government intervention. Read coined the term "Stolen Generations" to refer to the children subject to these interventions in a 1981 study. After graduating with a doctorate, Read worked as an academic for the rest of his career, primarily working on Australian Indigenous history. He has also published work on the relationship between non-indigenous Australians and the land. In 2019, Read was made a Member of the Order of Australia for his work on Indigenous history.

== Life and career ==
Read was born in Sydney in 1945. He attended Knox Grammar School before studying at the Australian National University (ANU), University of Toronto and University of Bristol. Read taught in Canberra and London before becoming a curriculum research officer for the Northern Territory Department of Education from 1976 to 1978.

With Coral Edwards, Read founded the organisation Link-Up in 1980. Link-Up reconnected Aboriginal families who had children forcibly separated from them by the government via adoption and state wardship. Read was the first to employ the term "Stolen Generations" to describe these practices in a 1981 study titled "The Stolen Generations: The removal of Aboriginal children in New South Wales 1883 to 1969". Link-Up eventually opened offices in every state. A documentary called Link-Up Diary was filmed by David MacDougall in 1986 and captured the work of Read and Edwards reuniting Aboriginal families. Link-Up's work played an important role in a wider campaign that led to the Bringing Them Home inquiry.

Following the completion of his doctoral studies in 1984, Read worked as an academic at ANU's School of Social Sciences. In 1995, Read, with Jackie Huggins, started the "Seven Years On' project which interviewed the same ten people at seven-year intervals like the UK documentary Seven Up. He has edited the journal Aboriginal History, and from 2005 to 2006, he served as the Deputy Director at the National Centre for Indigenous Studies. He later held the position of Research Professor in the Department of History at the University of Sydney.

== Research and writing ==
Read is known for his work in the field of Australian Indigenous history. Read conducts his work through researching government archives and through the oral accounts of Aboriginal people, a practice he started in 1977. In an interview, he said he always travels with a tape recorder.

In his research, Read initially estimated that 5,625 Aboriginal children were forcibly removed from their families in New South Wales, before revising that figure up to around 10,000 in his book A Rape of the Soul so Profound. Historian Keith Windschuttle has challenged Read's work on the Stolen Generations and his interpretation of government files. Read refuted Windschuttle's reading of the files and historian Stuart Macintyre called Windschuttle's view "absurd".

Read argues that the retelling of history encompasses "central truths" and "smaller truths". Central truths are larger historical facts such as that Aboriginal children were forcibly separated from their families or that Aboriginal people suffered violent dispossession of their lands. Smaller truths, such as Aboriginal interclan violence or compassion shown to Aboriginal people by government officials, supplement and add complexity to the central truth but do not refute it. In 1995, Read felt the central truth of the Stolen Generations had been established and hoped to focus his work on the smaller truths. However, Read contends that it is not feasible to tell small truths when the central truth is perpetually questioned. According to Read, rather than being able to work in new areas that could be more impactful for Indigenous Australians, historians are often forced to rehash established facts.

Starting in 1996 with his book Returning to Nothing, Read began to focus on the way non-indigenous Australians connect to the land.

== Honours ==
In 2003, Read was elected as a Fellow of the Academy of the Social Sciences in Australia. He was a recipient of the Member of the Order of Australia for "significant service to Indigenous history" in the Queen's Birthday 2019 Honours List.

== Publications ==
- A Hundred Years War: The Wiradjuri people and the state (1988)
- Charles Perkins; a biography (1990)
- Long Time, Olden Time: Aboriginal accounts of Northern Territory history, co-author Jay Read (1991)
- Returning to Nothing; The meaning of lost places (1996)
- A Rape of the Soul So Profound; The return of the stolen generations (1999)
- Belonging; Australians, place and Aboriginal ownership (2000)
- Haunted Earth (2003)
- Narrow But Endlessly Deep: The struggle for memorialisation in Chile since the transition to democracy (2016)
- What the Colonists Never Knew: A History of Aboriginal Sydney, co-author Dennis Foley (2020)
- The Life and Work of Ante Dabro, Australian-Croatian Sculptor: The Midnight Sea in the Blood (2023)

Edited by Read

- The Lost Children, editors Coral Edwards and Peter Read (1989)
- What Good Condition? Reflections on an Australian Aboriginal Treaty 1986–2006, editors Peter Read, Gary Meyers and Bob Reece (2006)
- Indigenous Biography and Autobiography, editors Peter Read, Frances Peters-Little and Anna Haebich (2008)
