= Fred Conway (Aboriginal elder) =

Fred Conway OAM
- Born: 17 August 1944 (age 82); Woorabinda, Queensland, Australia
- Occupation: park ranger (retired)
- Known for: helping develop the Aboriginal Seasonal Ranger Program at Carnarvon National Park
- Awards: Queensland Great (2014)

Fred Conway OAM (born 17 August 1944) is an Australian Aboriginal elder and former park ranger in Queensland.

As a Bidjara and Barada elder, Conway is best known for his advocacy for the protection of sacred Aboriginal sites and for extensive conservation work in Carnarvon National Park.

He is also credited with helping develop a program in 2005 called the Aboriginal Seasonal Ranger Program.

== Life and career ==
=== Early life ===
Conway was born on 17 August 1944 in the Aboriginal mission of Woorabinda where he grew up. He has said when he was growing up the 1940s and 1950s, he was naive about his culture as Aboriginal people on missions were not permitted to speak about or practice their culture. However, Conway said by the time he was a teenager, the superintendent would exercise some leniency, allowing the residents to gather bush tucker on weekends and hunt food to feed the community.

He had ambitions to be a carpenter which he believed would have enabled him to build a proper home for his grandparents but an expectation existed where a son would following his father's trade. Therefore, he became a stockman like his father and worked on "Foleyvale Station", the Woorabinda Pastoral Company's cattle property situated on the Mackenzie River, north of Duaringa.

Conway said he didn't enjoy working as a stockman but it helped him develop a respect for the countryside. He worked on a cattle station near Winton before joining the Roy Bell tent boxing troupe travelling throughout Queensland and New South Wales before spending a year in the Mount Penang Boys Home before finally returning home to Woorabinda at the age of 18.

After obtaining work as a police liaison officer, Conway met an Aboriginal relics officer who asked Conway if he'd be interested in such work. Conway took up the opportunity and subsequently worked in Brisbane, Mount Isa, Rockhampton and Injune.

=== Work at Carnarvon National Park ===
In the late 1980s, Conway took up a job as an interpretative ranger for the Queensland Parks and Wildlife Service at the Carnarvon National Park. Throughout his time as a ranger, he advocated for the protection of cultural sites such as the rock art found throughout the park and is credited with helping visitors understand Aboriginal history and culture and the need to respect the park's rock art sites.

While working in Carnarvon, Conway helped establish the Aboriginal Seasonal Ranger Program in 2005 which was designed to enable young Aboriginal people to get back onto country and learn skills and become involved in the management of their land.

=== Retirement ===
Conway retired to Duaringa in April 2014 but under the Nature Conservation Act was named as an honorary protector of Carnarvon National Park.

In 2014, Conway was in discussions with Central Highlands Regional Council about launching a local initiative where he could teach tourists in Emerald about the making of traditional weapons such as nulla nullas and boomerangs while also conducting local walking tours to educate visitors about the ways of Indigenous Australians.

In 2019, he was diagnosed with head and neck cancer. He underwent surgery to remove the cancer and spent eight months in Brisbane receiving radiation treatment. However, the cancer returned in 2021.

Conway is a grandfather of more than 70 grandchildren.

== Awards ==
In 2014, Conway was named as a Queensland Great.

In the 2020 Australia Day Honours, Conway was awarded a Medal of the Order of Australia in recognition of his service to conservation and the environment. He accepted his OAM at Government House in Brisbane on his final day of radiation treatment in July 2020.

After accepting the award, Conway stated: "I cried. I just didn’t think as an indigenous person born in Woorabinda – which at times has been criticised – would be in the position of getting this award. I didn’t put myself out to receive these things, I just went about my duty in life. I’m a person from the country, I love the bush. I’ve enjoyed my life. As I said to the governor-general, this goes not only just to me but also to the people of Woorabinda, not only them but Indigenous people too.”
