= Australian Healthcare and Hospitals Association =

Australian public hospital organisation

The Australian Healthcare and Hospitals Association (AHHA), founded in 1946, is the representative body for the public hospital sector in Australia. It is one of 23 bodies funded from the government's Health Peaks and Advisory Bodies Program.

The Deeble Institute for Health Policy Research is its research arm. Alison Verhoeven is the Chief Executive.

The members of the association are all major health service providers, including state health departments, local hospital networks, public hospitals, community health services, primary health networks, primary healthcare providers, aged care providers, universities, individual health professionals, and academics. The association is considered an independent, national voice for universal high-quality healthcare, benefiting the entire Australian community.

It demanded more effective leadership of the healthcare sector and better-coordinated government reform initiatives in May 2019. In particular it demanded reversal of the “massive” cuts to adult public dental services and fluoridation of the water supply. The association calls for an independent national health authority, which is distinct from the existing state and territory health departments and could tackle entrenched problems and support integrated care.

In June 2019 it denied claims by Scott Morrison that the admission of refugees would disadvantage Australians in their access to hospital care.

It makes an annual award, the Sidney Sax medal, to an individual who has made an outstanding contribution in the field of health services policy, organization, delivery and research.

It publishes a monthly peer-reviewed journal, the Australian Health Review.

In December 2023, the AHHA reviewed the National Health Reform Agreement (NHRA) Mid-term Review Final Report, which covered specific areas like elective surgery wait-lists, Medicare improvements, and support for the National Disability Insurance Scheme (NDIS). AHHA acknowledged the report's recommendations for digital health, alternative funding models, and patient-centric care pathways. These recommendations are part of a broader strategy to advance healthcare in Australia. AHHA recommends that Health Ministers consider these proposals to enhance the national healthcare system.
