= National Congress of Australia's First Peoples =

National body for Indigenous Australians, 2010–2019

- Industry: Policy and advocacy
- Founded: 2010
- Website: https://webarchive.nla.gov.au/awa/20150411171519/http://nationalcongress.com.au/

The National Congress of Australia's First Peoples was the national representative body for Aboriginal and Torres Strait Islander Australians from 2009 to 2019.

== History ==
Planning to establish National Congress was undertaken by a committee established by then Social Justice Commissioner of the Australian Human Rights Commission, Tom Calma. The organisation was announced in November 2009. Its first elected co-chairs were Jody Broun and Les Malezer. Subsequent chairs included Kirstie Parker, Jackie Huggins and Rod Little.

It was registered as a charity in December 2012, but in June 2019 went into voluntary administration.

== Corporate structure ==
National Congress was a public company limited by guarantee. Membership was open to Aboriginal and Torres Strait Islander individuals and organisations. Two important features of National Congress' organisational structure were gender parity, and oversight of elections and day-to-day operations by an ethics council.

National Congress consisted of a Board of 8 directors (four women and four men) of which two (one woman and one man) were elected directly by the members to serve as co-chairs for a term on two years.

There were three membership categories: peak and national organisations which formed Chamber 1; Chamber 2 (i.e. regional, state, territory or other organisations) and Chamber 3 (individual members). Members of each chamber elected 20 female and 20 male delegates, who in turn, elected one female and one male director to sit on the board.

Each year, all of the delegates were invited to attend a two-day National Congress meeting which established broad policy positions. The Board met monthly.

National Congress maintained a secretariat in Redfern, Sydney, headed by a CEO who was responsible for day-to-day operations related to media, membership services, event management, public relations, financial and human resources management, and policy analysis and development services. The first CEO was Lindon Coombes, who was followed by Geoff Scott and Gary Oliver.

The first National Congress meeting of 120 delegates was held in June 2011.

== Operation ==
According to its 2017 submission to the Australian Charities and Not-for-profits Commission:

National Congress of Australia's First Peoples ("National Congress") is the national elected and representative body for Aboriginal and Torres Strait Islander Peoples in Australia. Established in 2010, National Congress has grown from inception to comprise and serve over 180 organisations and almost 9000 individual members. National Congress advocates for self-determination and the implementation of the United Nations Declaration on the Rights of Indigenous peoples. National Congress believes it is essential that Aboriginal and Torres Strait Islander people are central participants in decisions impacting on our lives and communities, and in all areas including our lands, health, education, law, governance and economic empowerment. We promote respect for our cultures and recognition as the core of our national heritage. National Congress has focused its energies on Aboriginal and Torres Strait Islander recognition and status of our rights, including the areas of health, education, land and sea rights, social justice, Constitutional reform and sovereignty. Additionally National Congress has been heavily involved in a wide range of other matters, including political relations, cultural maintenance and development, revitalisation of our languages, treaty discussions, employment and economic empowerment, housing, family violence, children and youth safety, disabilities, governance and leadership. In our role as the voice of Australia's First Peoples and as a product of consultation with our members and communities, National Congress provides expert perspectives on important issues affecting our Peoples. National Congress has been centrally involved in providing context and articulating the importance of: the 1967 referendum 50th Anniversary, Closing the Gap, the Federal Budget, the 'Change the Date' campaign and consultation with various arms of the United Nations amongst others.

== Reception ==
Australian Human Rights Commissioner Mick Gooda welcomed the formation as a milestone moment for Indigenous Australians. Northern Land Council CEO Kim Hill also welcomed the formation of the Congress. Aboriginal activist Noel Pearson criticised the Congress as "a blackfella's wailing wall".

== 2019 closure ==
In 2013 the Australian Government withdrew funding of National Congress. It was forced out of operation in July 2019 after its reserves had been exhausted. At that time the company had about 10,000 members and 180 affiliated community organisations.

Ken Wyatt, then the recently appointed Minister for Indigenous Australians in the Morrison government, made a decision not to revive the organisation.

== See also ==
- Indigenous voice to government
