= Frank Fisher (rugby league) =

Australian rugby league player

Personal information
- Born: 1905 Townsville, Queensland, Australia
- Died: 1980 (aged 74–75)

Playing information
- Position: five-eighth, halfback
Club
Years	Team	Pld	T	G	FG	P
	Barambah
Representative
Years	Team	Pld	T	G	FG	P
1932–36	Wide Bay	2

Frank Fisher (1905–1980) was an Aboriginal Australian professional rugby league footballer. Nicknamed "Big Shot" and "King" Fisher, he has been described as the Wally Lewis of Aboriginal Rugby league players. He was named as a member of the Indigenous Australian Rugby League Team of the Century.

== Family life ==
He was born 1905 in Townsville, Queensland the son of Frank Fisher Sr and his wife Rosie Shilling. His father had served with the 11th Light Horse Regiment but Fisher's attempt to follow in his father's footsteps in 1940 was blocked on racial grounds. He is the paternal grandfather of Australian track athlete and Olympic gold medalist Cathy Freeman.

== Rugby league ==
In the 1930s Fisher was captain of the Barambah rugby league team.

In 1932 and again in 1936 he played at half-back for the Wide Bay representative side against the Great Britain touring teams. The English captain, Jim Brough, was reported as saying that "Fisher was the best country player the Englishmen had encountered." On Brough's recommendation, Fisher was offered a contract to play club rugby league in Salford, England but the Queensland Government refused his application to travel under the Aboriginals Protection and Restriction of Sale of Opium Act 1897 (Qld).

He has been described as "fast, with a distinctive side-step, playing either at fly-half or centre three-quarter."

In 1946 he was still leading the Cherbourg team as captain to victory.

== Cricket ==
Fisher further displayed his athletic ability in cricket. On one occasion, playing for the Cherbourg A Grade side against Goomeri, he struck 105 (retired) in 32 minutes including 11 sixes and 5 fours. His side won by 294 on the first innings on a day when the Cherbourg side was without the usual services of fast bowler Eddie Gilbert. Fisher's feat was reported nationally.

== Honours and awards ==
On 8 June 1996 a bridge over Barambah Creek, Cherbourg and named in his honour was opened.

In 2010 Fisher was named as a member of Australian rugby league's Indigenous Team of the Century.
