= Ian Anderson (social scientist) =

Australian academic and senior public servant

Professor Ian Anderson AO FASSA FAHMS
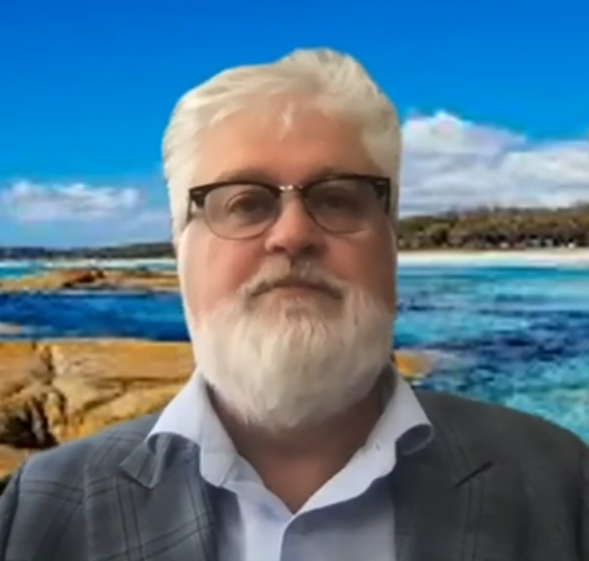
- In an online discussion in 2021
- Born: 1965 (age 60–61); Tasmania

Ian Phillip Anderson (born 1965) is an Australian academic and senior public servant.

== Education ==
Anderson qualified his MB BS at the University of Melbourne, and then obtained his PhD at the La Trobe University.

== Career ==
Anderson rose to be a Pro Vice-Chancellor at the University of Melbourne. He was then seconded to the Department of the Prime Minister and Cabinet. Here Anderson became Deputy Secretary for Indigenous Affairs.

In 1993, Anderson delivered one of the annual series of Australian Broadcasting Corporation Boyer Lectures called "Voices of the Land".

== Personal ==
Ian Anderson born near Devonport, Tasmania in 1965 was the eldest child of Sandra Smith (née Anderson).

== Honours and awards ==
- 2017 Officer of the Order of Australia for "For distinguished service to the Indigenous community, particularly in the areas of health equality, aged care and education, as an academic, researcher and medical practitioner, to policy reform, and as a role model".
- 2018 Elected Fellow of the Academy of the Social Sciences in Australia
- 2018 Elected Fellow of the Australian Academy of Health and Medical Sciences
