= Linda Lovett =

Australian lawyer, barrister

- Occupation: Lawyer
- Known for: First Indigenous woman member of the Bar in Victoria

Linda Lovett is an Australian lawyer and was the first Indigenous woman to become a member of the Bar in Victoria, Australia (11 May 2006). She is a part of the Bunurong tribe of Victoria and the Pyemmairrener tribe of Tasmania.

== Biography ==
For much of Lovett's childhood, her family lived in the family car, travelling from place to place around Victoria to avoid government authorities who, her parents feared, might separate the children from their parents as part of the Stolen Generations.

Lovett completed her legal studies while raising three children as a single mother. In her final years of study, she worked for the Department of Justice. In 2002, Lovett helped to establish the Indigenous Law Students and Lawyers Association. The organisation was later renamed Tarwirri and used as a model for a nationwide organisation.

She became a member of the Bar in Victoria in 2006, the first Indigenous woman and the second Indigenous person to do so. She took a position as a criminal lawyer with Victoria Legal Aid, and worked in the Magistrates’ and Children's courts at Werribee, Sunshine, Bacchus Marsh, Preston and Heidelberg. She also worked with clients of the Mental Health Review Board.
