= Jackie Huggins =

Indigenous Australian historian and writer (born 1956)

Jackie Huggins AM FAHA
- Huggins in 2026

Co-chair of the National Congress of Australia's First Peoples
- In office November 2015 – July 2019 Serving with Rod Little
- Preceded by: Kirstie Parker
- Succeeded by: Office abolished

Co-chair of Reconciliation Australia
- In office 2002–2007 Serving with Fred Chaney (2002–2005) and Mark Leibler (2005–2007)
- Preceded by: Shelley Reys
- Succeeded by: Mick Dodson

Personal details
- Born: Jacqueline Gail Huggins; 19 August 1956 (age 70) Ayr, Queensland, Australia
- Relations: Fred Conway (uncle)
- Parent: Rita Huggins (mother)
- Education: University of Queensland (BA); Flinders University
- Occupation: Author; Aboriginal rights activist; historian
- Awards: Stanner Award for Indigenous Literature (1996); Jim Bettison and Helen James Award (2018)

Jacqueline "Jackie" Gail Huggins (born 19 August 1956) is an Aboriginal Australian historian, author and advocate for Indigenous rights. She was a co-commissioner for the nation-wide inquiry which led to the Bringing Them Home report in Queensland. She served as the co-chair of Reconciliation Australia from 2002 to 2007, and the National Congress of Australia's First Peoples from 2015 to 2019. Huggins has been involved in the Path to Treaty movement in Queensland and serving as the first-ever Australian Broadcasting Corporation Elder-in-Residence since 2025.

Huggins was born in Ayr, Queensland, to Rita Huggins and John Henry "Jack" Huggins. She belongs to the Bidjara and Birri Gubba Juru tribe and moved to Brisbane's Inala after her father's death in 1958. At the age of 15, she dropped out of school to earn money for her family and served as a typist at the Australian Broadcasting Commission and later Commonwealth Department of Aboriginal Affairs. She received her Bachelor of Arts degree in history and anthropology from the University of Queensland (UQ) in 1987, followed by a Diploma of Education and honours from Flinders University.

Throughout the 1990s, Huggins was a freelance author, historian, and consultant. Huggins collaborated with her mother to write Auntie Rita (1994). The pair won the Stanner Award for Indigenous Literature in 1996. Huggins went on to become the deputy director of UQ's Aboriginal and Torres Strait Islander Studies Unit in 1997 after having been a member of the inquiry team for the separation of Aboriginal and Torres Strait Islander children from their families. Later works include Sister Girl (1998) and Jack of Hearts: QX11594 (2022) written by Huggins and her sister, Ngaire Jarro.

Huggins was among the founders of Reconciliation Australia and later co-chaired the body. She was a part of the establishment of the First Nations Australia Writers Network in 2012 and also became its patron. Huggins was chosen co-chair of the National Congress of Australia's First Peoples in 2015, along with Rod Little. She also served as co-chair of the Path to Treaty Eminent Panel of Queensland in 2019 with Michael Lavarch and also co-chair of the Treaty Advancement Committee in 2021 with Mick Gooda. ggins was appointed a Member of the Order of Australia (AM) in 2001 and elected a Fellow of the Australian Academy of the Humanities (FAHA) in 2007.

== Early life and education ==
Jacqueline "Jackie" Gail Huggins was born on 19 August 1956 in Ayr, Queensland. She is the daughter of Rita Cynthia Huggins (née Holt) and John Henry "Jack" Huggins. Her mother came from Bidjara–Pitjara Country in and around Carnarvon Gorge, and had been forcibly taken from her parents in the 1920s to the Barambah Aboriginal Settlement, which was renamed Cherbourg. Her father came from Ayr, on Birri Gubba Juru Country. He fought in the Second World War in the Australian Army and was a prisoner of war on the Burma Railway. After his death in 1958 aged 38, Rita took the family to Inala, Brisbane. In the 1960s Rita became a member of the One People of Australia League and held the position of director for 20 years.

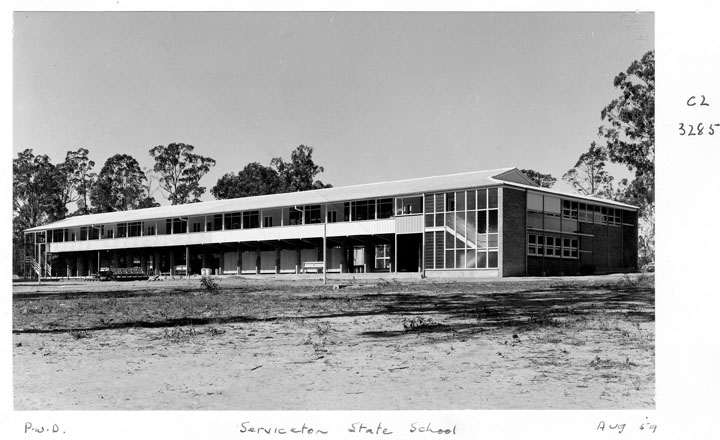
Serviceton State School, which Huggins attended, in August 1959

Huggins was educated at Serviceton State School, where she was school captain, and later attended Inala State High School. The teacher at her primary school, Beryl Roberts, helped her get an interest in furthering her education. According to Huggins, she had to deal with discrimination at school and helped her mother conduct fundraisers during the campaign for the 1967 referendum. Her interest in history is related to the discrimination her mother went through and the lack of recognition given to Aboriginal history at school. She dropped out of school at 15 to help her family.

Between 1972 and 1978, Huggins was employed as a typist at the Australian Broadcasting Commission in Toowong. She then transferred to Canberra to become an employee of the Commonwealth Department of Aboriginal Affairs. Here, Huggins worked with Aboriginal leaders such as Charles Perkins. She served on the National NAIDOC committee between 1979 and 1983. Huggins was appointed as a field officer of the department in Brisbane in 1980.

Huggins enrolled full-time in education at the University of Queensland (UQ) in 1985 when her son was born. She graduated with a Bachelor of Arts (Honours) degree majoring in history and anthropology in 1987. Huggins studied under the supervision of two historians Raymond Evans and Kay Saunders during her time at UQ. Huggins then proceeded to do a Diploma of Education at Flinders University in 1989. In addition to this, she did teaching practice at Ti-Tree in the Northern Territory.

== Career ==
=== Bringing Them Home inquiry (1990–1999) ===
Between 1990 and 1997, Huggins was employed as a freelance writer, historian, and consultant. In 1991, the Australian Institute of Aboriginal and Torres Strait Islander Studies (AIATSIS) awarded Huggins a grant to research and write Auntie Rita, along with her mother. Huggins produced Gundoos Stories in 1993, featuring writing by Aboriginal children from the West End Primary School, wrote Maarkkings, a play for the Contact Youth Theatre and ran writing workshops with Aboriginal women in Inala. She was also employed as a historian at the Brisbane City Council and as an Australian history consultant at Deakin University.

Huggins, along with her mother, published Auntie Rita in 1994. That same year, Huggins was elected to the executive of the Council for Aboriginal Reconciliation and served as a co-convenor of its Documents Committee. In 1995, Huggins served as a writer-in-residence at Charles Sturt University in Albury, co-edited Aboriginal Workers with Ann McGrath and Saunders, and was appointed to the AIATSIS Council, which position she held until 2007. In 1996, Huggins collaborated with historian Peter Read and the National Library of Australia on an oral history project involving emerging Aboriginal leaders.

Between 1996 and 1997, Huggins acted as a co-commissioner in the National Inquiry into the Separation of Aboriginal and Torres Strait Islander Children from Their Families that produced the Bringing Them Home report. She was appointed as the deputy director of UQ's Aboriginal and Torres Strait Islander Studies Unit on 6 August 1997. In 1998, she published the book titled Sister Girl, comprising essays and interviews, and worked as a member of the Queensland Constitutional Review Commission till 1999. She carried out her later research work in the Seven Years On and Bringing Them Home oral history projects conducted by the National Library and the Racism in Schools Project at UQ.

=== Reconciliation and First Nations advocacy (2000–2019) ===
During the Corroboree 2000 event, Huggins participated in the Walk for Reconciliation, held in May 2000, over the Sydney Harbour Bridge. (Note: Huggins wore a yellow suit to a Corroboree 2000 event at the Sydney Opera House on the eve of the Walk for Reconciliation. She later donated the suit to the National Museum of Australia.) In 2001, she was among the founders of Reconciliation Australia and later co-chaired the organisation while chairing the Queensland Domestic Violence Council. From 2002 to 2004, she was the member of the Aboriginal and Torres Strait Islander Commission Review Panel and co-chaired the Queensland prisoner release policy inquiry in 2004. By 2006, she had been a director of the Telstra Foundation and Australian Centre for Indigenous History. In 2008, Huggins co-chaired the Indigenous Australia stream of the Australia 2020 Summit.

Huggins became a member of the working group that set up the First Nations Australia Writers Network in 2012. The group was created following discussions during the 2011 Guwanyi Indigenous Writers Festival, and it was set up in order to provide representation to First Nations authors and storytellers. Huggins then became the patron of the group.

In November 2015, Huggins and Rod Little were elected co-chairs of the National Congress of Australia's First Peoples, which is a national representative organisation for Aboriginal and Torres Strait Islander peoples. As a co-chair of the organisation, Huggins has supported the Uluru Statement from the Heart and the idea of establishing an Indigenous voice to Parliament.

(L–R) Little, Kevin Rudd, Thérèse Rein, Huggins and Gary Oliver after the parliamentary breakfast marking the 10th anniversary of the National Apology at Parliament House, Canberra, in 2018

Huggins participated in the first National Reconciliation Action Plan Conference in 2018 that was jointly organised by the Swinburne University of Technology. In the following year, she delivered the annual Barak–Wonga Oration at the university. As part of her speech, Huggins noted that the lack of knowledge about Aboriginal history and culture within her own education made her become a historian.

=== Path to Treaty and beyond (2019–present) ===
In July 2019, the Government of Queensland appointed Huggins and Michael Lavarch as co-chairs of the Path to Treaty Eminent Panel. Huggins also served as the co-chair of the Treaty Working Group. Both the panel and the working group consulted over 1,700 people from 24 communities within Queensland and made their recommendations in February 2020. According to Huggins, consultations have revealed a high level of support for the inclusion of truth-telling within the process of making the treaty.

Carnarvon Gorge from Boolinda Bluff in 2016

Also in 2020, Huggins participated in the Gathering of the Clans held in Carnarvon Gorge, where Aboriginal people related to this region gathered.

The Queensland government responded to the recommendations in August 2020 by announcing the establishment of a Treaty Advancement Committee. Huggins and Mick Gooda were appointed the co-chairs of the committee in February 2021.

In 2022 Magabala Books released Jack of Hearts: QX11594, the biography of Huggins's father which she wrote alongside her sister, Ngaire Jarro. The sisters made use of family stories and archival material, conducted interviews with the offspring of former prisoners of war, and visited Changi and other locations along the Burma–Thailand Railway. The book provides an overview of their father’s military career and subsequent life in the context of the lives of Aboriginal veterans and their families.

In April 2025, Huggins commenced her position as the first Australian Broadcasting Corporation (ABC) Elder-in-Residence. The role was created by the ABC after its 2024 investigation into the matter of workplace racism at the station, titled Listen Loudly, Act Strongly. Huggins stated that she would mentor, advocate for and support the employees of the broadcaster.

== Awards and honours ==
Huggins received the Stewart Murray Memorial Fellowship from the University of Melbourne in 1992. Auntie Rita, which she co-wrote with her mother, was shortlisted for the Nita Kibble Award in 1995. The two authors shared the Stanner Award for Indigenous Literature for the book in 1996.

Huggins received the Queensland Premier's Millennium Award for Excellence in Indigenous Affairs in 2000. She received the Centenary Medal on 1 January 2001 for promoting reconciliation and was appointed a Member of the Order of Australia (AM) on 11 June 2001 for services to the Indigenous community in reconciliation, social justice, literacy and women's issues. UQ awarded her an honorary doctorate in 2006 and named her Alumnus of the Year in 2007. That year, she was also elected a Fellow of the Australian Academy of the Humanities (FAHA).

In 2018, Huggins received the Jim Bettison and Helen James Award, administered by the Adelaide Film Festival, in recognition of her work as a writer, historian and social justice advocate. The $50,000 award supported her work on a book about Aboriginal war veterans from both world wars.

In August 2019, Swinburne University of Technology appointed Huggins its inaugural Vice-Chancellor's Fellow for Indigenous Leadership. In May 2021, the Australian National University announced her appointment as an honorary professor in its School of History, where she was to advise the Research Centre for Deep History.

In 2022, Huggins received the John Oxley Library Medal from the State Library of Queensland and the Indigenous Justice Award from the Australian and New Zealand Society of Criminology. In 2023, Jack of Hearts: QX11594, which she co-wrote with her sister Ngaire Jarro, was longlisted for the Stella Prize. The judges noted that the sisters' effort to understand their father's life was central to the biography.

Federation University Australia awarded Huggins an honorary doctorate on 16 October 2024. In 2025, she received the inaugural John Moriarty AM Impact Award from Flinders University for her advocacy in reconciliation, social justice and Indigenous rights.

== Personal life ==
Huggins has a son named John Henry Huggins, who was born in 1985. She has talked about the impact of her mother and the advice she received from Lowitja O'Donoghue and Evelyn Scott.

Huggins has talked about visiting Carnarvon Gorge annually. Her uncle, Fred Conway, has served as a ranger in the gorge for 30 years and is a spiritual guide to her. McGrath invited them to be part of Marking Country, a digital project where Indigenous custodians speak about their country through six sites. They have assisted in mapping out the gorge and the rock art, and their presentation was done at a conference held at the Australian National University.

In 2025, Huggins mentioned that she uses around 20 words in the Bidjara language when talking to her family members. In addition, she says that her family has made plans to participate in an effort to learn and spread their language.

Huggins is a close friend of Rhoda Roberts, who has served as the first SBS Elder-in-Residence since 2021.

== Selected bibliography ==
=== Books and edited works ===
- Huggins, Rita; Huggins, Jackie (1994). Auntie Rita. Canberra: Aboriginal Studies Press. ISBN 978-0-85575-248-4.
- McGrath, Ann; Saunders, Kay; Huggins, Jackie, eds. (November 1995). Aboriginal Workers. Labour History. Vol. 69. Australian Society for the Study of Labour History. ISBN 978-0-909944-04-9.
- Huggins, Jackie (1998). Sister Girl: The Writings of Aboriginal Activist and Historian Jackie Huggins. University of Queensland Press. ISBN 978-0-7022-2840-7.
- Huggins, Jackie (2002). Working the Walk: Activating Reconciliation. Frank Archibald Memorial Lecture Series. University of New England. ISBN 978-1-86389-784-6.
- Huggins, Jackie; Jarro, Ngaire (1 April 2022). Jack of Hearts: QX11594. Magabala Books. ISBN 978-1-922613-12-7.
- McGrath, Ann; Huggins, Jackie, eds. (2025). Deep History: Country and Sovereignty. NewSouth Publishing. ISBN 978-1-76117-030-0.

=== Articles and chapters ===
- Huggins, Jackie (1987). "Black Women and Women's Liberation". Hecate. 13 (1): 77–82.
- Huggins, Jackie (1992). "Towards a Biography of Rita Huggins". Australian Feminist Studies. 7 (16): 70–85. doi:10.1080/08164649.1992.9994662.
- Huggins, Jackie (1993). "Always Was Always Will Be". Australian Historical Studies. 25 (100): 459–464. doi:10.1080/10314619308595927.
- Huggins, Jackie (1993). "Pretty Deadly Tidda Business". In Gunew, Sneja; Yeatman, Anna (eds.). Feminism and the Politics of Difference. Allen & Unwin. pp. 107–115.
- Huggins, Jackie (November 1995). "White Aprons, Black Hands: Aboriginal Women Domestic Servants in Queensland". Labour History (69): 188–195. doi:10.2307/27516398. JSTOR 27516398.
- Huggins, Jackie (2004). "Indigenous Women and Leadership: A Personal Reflection". Indigenous Law Bulletin. 6 (1): 5–7.
- Huggins, Jackie (2014). "Foreword". Making the Connection: Essays on Indigenous Digital Excellence. Vivid Publishing. ISBN 978-1-925171-74-7.
