= Coalition of Peaks =

Peak body of Indigenous Australian organisations

The Coalition of Aboriginal and Torres Strait Islander Peak Bodies, usually known as the Coalition of Peaks is an Australian peak body whose members comprise Aboriginal and Torres Strait Islander community-controlled organisations. Its main purpose is to negotiate with the various Australian governments (Commonwealth and state and territory) regarding a national agreement on the Closing the Gap framework. Closing the Gap is a government strategy that aims to reduce disparity between Aboriginal and Torres Strait Islander peoples and non-Indigenous Australians on key health, education, and economic opportunity targets.

It was formed in 2018, driven largely by the National Aboriginal Community Controlled Health Organisation (NACCHO).

== Background and history ==
In 2008, the Council of Australian Governments (COAG) made a commitment to work together to reduce the disparity between outcomes in areas such as life expectancy, health, education, and imprisonment, for non-Indigenous Australians compared with Indigenous Australians. The National Indigenous Reform Agreement (NIRA) included a strategy called "Closing the Gap", which laid out targets in reducing inequalities in these areas. This framework included plans for new programs and services, stronger reporting requirements, and a process by which progress on the targets could be measured. Some Indigenous people were involved in the development of the strategy, but it was mostly done by governments. Progress on achieving the targets was slow, for various reasons which included inadequate community involvement. In 2016, 14 community-controlled peak organisations wrote to Prime Minister Morrison, state premiers, and chief ministers to ask that the Council of Australian Governments (COAG; later National Cabinet) not make further changes to Closing the Gap without Indigenous communities providing support as well as being able to provide input in a formal and ongoing role.

The Coalition of Peaks was formed in 2018, its foundation led by the National Aboriginal Community Controlled Health Organisation (NACCHO). December 2018, COAG recognised the authority of the Coalition of Peaks, The government recognised the organisation in December of that year, and in March 2019 the Partnership Agreement on Closing the Gap, also known as the National Agreement on Closing the Gap, set to remain in place for 10 years, was agreed between the Coalition of Peaks and COAG. It was signed by representatives of the Coalition of Peaks, each state and territory government, and the Australian Local Government Association, represented by the National Federation Reform Council.

In the Albanese government's May 2024 budget, it committed A$151 million to fulfilling Closing the Gap targets, a move welcomed by the Coalition of Peaks. The cost-of-living crisis had severely impacted Indigenous communities.

At the Garma Festival in July 2024, prime minister Anthony Albanese, in the wake of a disappointing Closing the Gap report which showed several targets not being met, focused on economic empowerment of Indigenous people as a key to reducing disadvantage and closing the gap. He said that he would be working closely with the Coalition of Peaks.

In March 2026, Pat Turner announced her retirement from her position as Lead Convenor at Peaks and Donnella Mills, a Torres Strait Islander, was endorsed to take her position until June 2027.

== Description ==
As of 2024 over 80 Aboriginal and Torres Strait Islander community-controlled peak and member organisations across Australia, representing around 800 organisations, are members of the Coalition of Aboriginal and Torres Strait Islander Peak Bodies, or Coalition of Peaks. The members include national, state and territory non-government Aboriginal and Torres Strait Islander peak bodies, and independent statutory authorities responsible for policies, programs, and services related to Closing the Gap. It is the only federal body representing Indigenous Australian that advises the Commonwealth, and its role is limited to the Closing the Gap strategy.

Its stated objectives are:

1. Change the way Australian governments work with Aboriginal and Torres Strait Islander people, organisations, and communities on Closing the Gap through partnerships based on our right to self-determination, shared decision-making, and equal participation.
2. Strengthen and build the Aboriginal and Torres Strait Islander community-controlled sector to provide a greater proportion of services to our people.
3. Pursue the rights of Aboriginal and Torres Strait Islander people, organisations, and communities to have access to all relevant data and information.

== Governance ==
The Coalition of Peaks is an unincorporated body. Its members have governing boards elected by Aboriginal and Torres Strait Islander communities or organisations accountable to Aboriginal and Torres Strait Islander communities, but the Coalition of Peaks has no governing board or office holders. Decisions relating to the organisation's policy, strategy, and governance are made by its members, by consensus.

The Partnership Agreement established a Joint Council on Closing the Gap, comprising representatives of all parties to the agreement. Pat Turner is co-chair of the council. She is also co-convenor of the Coalition of Peaks, along with Catherine Liddle, who has been CEO of SNAICC – National Voice for Our Children (formerly Secretariat of National Aboriginal and Islander Child Care) since February 2021.

== Significant members ==
Significant organisations which are members of the Coalition of Peaks include:

- National Aboriginal Community Controlled Health Organisation (NACCHO)
- SNAICC – National Voice for Our Children
