= Joyce Wilding =

Australian indigenous rights activist and community worker

- Joyce Wilding in Brisbane in 1960

Joyce Wilding MBE (1909 – 1978) was an activist for indigenous rights in Queensland, Australia in the 1950s and 1960s and a community worker.

== Early life ==
Wilding was born Doris Winifred Harman on 3 January 1909 in Southampton, England to Job Henry Harman, a retired soldier, and his Anglo-Indian wife Sarah Florence, née Minty. She married Francis James Wilding in 1932 and migrated to Australia the following year. She changed her first name to Joyce and ran a boarding house in the family home in West End, Brisbane to supplement the family income.

== Activism ==
In 1953, Ian Shevill, the Anglican bishop of North Queensland, appealed for someone in Brisbane to provide accommodation for a young Aboriginal man from Yarrabah Mission, Tennyson Kynuna. He had secured an apprenticeship in Brisbane, but could not secure accommodation due to his race. After taking him in, Wilding was requested by the Queensland Department of Native Affairs to take in two Aboriginal trainee teachers, Phil Stewart and Mick Miller. The remaining 20 white guests in Wilding’s boarding house then moved out, in protest at being required to live with Aboriginal people. Startled by the response of her white guests, Wilding then opened her home to homeless Aboriginal people and the boarding house was soon overcrowded. She received death threats and frequent abuse.

In 1961, Wilding helped to form the One People of Australia League (OPAL), an organisation dedicated to promoting co-operation between Indigenous and non-Indigenous Australians, with a view to assimilation of Aboriginal people into white Australian culture. This goal put the organisation at odds with other Aboriginal rights groups, but it resulted in OPAL securing a great deal of government funding, enabling it to provide housing, education and welfare assistance to disadvantaged Aboriginal people in Queensland. Neville Bonner was president of OPAL from 1968 to 1975.

Wilding continued to provide housing for homeless Aboriginal people in her own home. Over time, thousands of Aboriginal people who had newly arrived in Brisbane found shelter there, including Jackie Huggins, who went on to become a prominent Aboriginal rights activist.

In 1970, OPAL opened the Joyce Wilding Home in Eight Mile Plains, Brisbane, which was a refuge for Aboriginal widows, deserted mothers and children. Wilding became matron of the home the same year. The institution still provides short-term accommodation for Aboriginal women and their children, and is now known as the Opal Joyce Wilding Hostel.

== Community work ==
In 1957, Wilding was a founding member of the St Veronica Welfare Committee, an organisation founded in West End, Brisbane initially to raise money for refugees. She travelled to India and Bangladesh to provide humanitarian aid and founded a relief society to send blankets, clothing and medical equipment to Dr R.R. Doshi’s tuberculosis clinic at Anand, Gujarat.

== Awards ==
Wilding was appointed MBE in the 1964 Queen’s Birthday Honours List for her work as matron of the OPAL Hostel named in her honour.

In 1966, Wilding was made the Quota Club of Brisbane's 'Woman of the Year'.

She was presented with a humanitarian award by the AMORC Grand Lodge in San Jose, California, in 1977.

== Personal life ==
Frank and Joyce Wilding had four children and continued to live in Brisbane for the rest of their lives. Joyce died of cancer on 3 December 1978.
