= Kirstie Parker =

Journalist and indigenous policy activist (born 1967)

- Parker in 2026
- Born: 1967 (age 58–59)
- Occupations: Journalist; Policy administrator; activist
- Writing career
- Notable awards: Centenary Medal (2001, 2003)

Kirstie Parker (born 1967) is a Yuwallarai journalist, policy administrator and Aboriginal Australian activist. From 2013 to 2015 she served as the co-chair of the National Congress of Australia's First Peoples and during her tenure pressed for policies that allowed Aboriginal and Torres Strait Islander Australians to gain the ability for self-determination.

She has served on the board of Reconciliation Australia and other public policy commissions aimed at improving the lives of Indigenous people. She was the third Aboriginal person to serve on the Australian Press Council. In 2018, her unpublished manuscript The Making of Ruby Champion won the David Unaipon Award of the Queensland Literary Awards, which included both publication and prize money.

She has been the Director of Aboriginal Affairs and Reconciliation for the Government of South Australia since 2017.

== Early life ==
Kirstie Parker was born as the third child of four siblings in 1967, the daughter of a Yuwallarai mother and a father originally from London. Her mother, Pam, had one year of formal schooling, but taught herself to read and write by studying Anne of Green Gables. Her father, Roger, was also an avid reader and they encouraged Parker in her writing. She was raised in northern New South Wales, Australia.

== Career ==
At 16, Parker began working as a junior journalist and throughout her career has worked in print media, radio and television. Among the media outlets she has been associated with are ABC Radio, The Tablelander regional paper in Atherton, Queensland and The West Australian newspaper of Perth. In 2006, she became the editor of the Koori Mail, a newspaper written and owned by Indigenous Australians, where she wrote for seven years.

In 2013, Parker was elected to serve a two-year term as co-chair of the National Congress of Australia's First Peoples, along with Les Malezer, a Gubbi Gubbi-Butchulla man from Queensland. During her tenure, a crisis in funding threatened Aboriginal communities across Australia with closure. Parker and Malezer strongly opposed the eviction of Indigenous people from their homelands, citing previous failures in adequately integrating Aboriginal people into new areas in various states and stressing the need for self-determination policies. The duo worked on the panel reviewing the status of recognition for Australia's Indigenous people in 2014. The following year Parker was one of the delegates who met with Prime Minister Tony Abbott and Opposition Leader Bill Shorten. She urged a recognition plan that allowed Aboriginal and Torres Strait Islander people to provide input into the recognition process. When Abbott agreed, a First Peoples National Convention was held. The convention recommended that the Constitution of Australia be amended to grant Aboriginal and Torres Strait Islander people representation in the federal Parliament and the establishment of a commission to supervise negotiations between First Nations and the government.

Parker is an activist and public policy advisor on Indigenous affairs. Some of her work in this area includes working at the Australian Institute of Aboriginal and Torres Strait Islander Studies in Canberra managing media and communications; serving as a director at Tandanya National Aboriginal Cultural Institute in Adelaide; directing public affairs for the Aboriginal and Torres Strait Islander Commission; and serving as media advisor to Robert Tickner, Minister for Aboriginal and Torres Strait Islander Affairs. She has served as a director of Reconciliation Australia and co-chair of the Closing the Gap campaign, an initiative which focuses on health issues of Indigenous Australians. She is a public speaker often discussing policies affecting Indigenous peoples and how the media can be used to empower Aboriginal people.

In 2015, she began working as the CEO of the National Centre of Indigenous Excellence in Redfern, New South Wales. In 2017, she became the third Indigenous person to be appointed to the Australian Press Council. Her role on the adjudication panel was to advise the council on Aboriginal issues. That year, she also joined the Department of Premier and Cabinet in South Australia as the Director of Aboriginal Affairs and Reconciliation, a post she held as of May 2021.

In June 2021 she took up the role of interim CEO of Tandanya National Aboriginal Cultural Institute in Adelaide, until late January 2022.

== Awards and honours ==
Parker has received numerous awards for both her writing and advocacy. In 2001, she received the Australian Government's Centenary Medal for her work with Indigenous communities and women. She received a Centenary Medal for contribution to the Indigenous community and Australian life (2003), and an International Women's Day Award for service to the SA community in 2000. Her journalism was recognised in 2008 with the Print Media Award of the Australian Human Rights Commission for her article "National Apology: commemorative lift out".

In 2012, Parker was recognised for her activism on behalf of Indigenous people with the 100 Women of Influence Awards presented by the Australian Financial Review. She was one of the inaugural women honoured with the Australian Peacewomen Awards of the Women's International League for Peace and Freedom at the organisation's centennial celebrations in 2015.

Parker was a finalist in the 2016 NSW Women of the Year Awards (Aboriginal Woman of the Year category).

In 2018, her unpublished manuscript The Making of Ruby Champion won the David Unaipon Award of the Queensland Literary Awards, which included both publication and prize money.
