= Cherbourg, Queensland =

Cherbourg
- Town
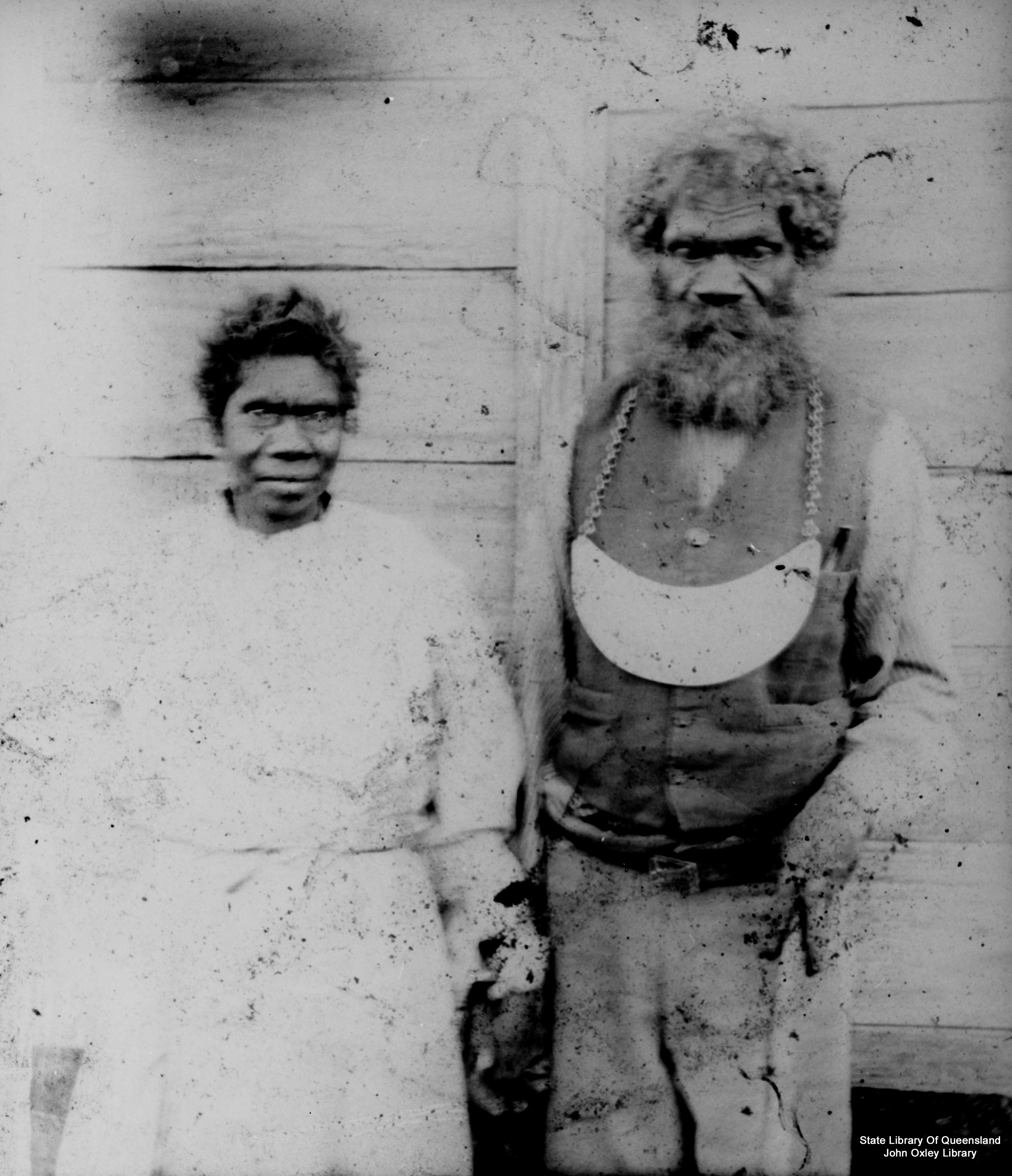
- George of Saxby Downs with his wife at Barambah Aboriginal Settlement, 1909

- Interactive map of Cherbourg
- Coordinates: 26.2920°S 151.9543°E
- Country: Australia
- State: Queensland
- LGA: Aboriginal Shire of Cherbourg
- Location: 6.2 km (3.9 mi) S of Murgon; 68.8 km (42.8 mi) NNE of Kingaroy; 96.7 km (60.1 mi) W of Gympie; 251 km (156 mi) NW of Brisbane
- Established: 1900

Government
  - State electorate: Nanango
  - Federal division: Wide Bay

Area
  - Total: 31.8 km^{2} (12.3 sq mi)
- Elevation: 310 m (1,020 ft)

Population
  - Total: 1,194 (2021 census)
  - Density: 37.55/km^{2} (97.25/sq mi)
- Time zone: UTC+10:00 (AEST)
- Postcode: 4605
Localities around Cherbourg
Ficks Crossing	Murgon	Murgon
Wondai	Cherbourg	Murgon
Wondai	Charlestown	Moffatdale

Cherbourg (/ˈʃɜːrbɜːrɡ/), formerly known as Barambah, Barambah Aboriginal Settlement and Cherbourg Aboriginal Settlement, is a rural town and locality in the Aboriginal Shire of Cherbourg, South Burnett region, Queensland, Australia. The traditional owners of this area are the Wakka Wakka People. In the 2021 census, the locality of Cherbourg had a population of 1,194 people, of whom 1,151 (96.4%) identified as Indigenous Australians.

== Geography ==
Cherbourg is located off the Bunya Highway approximately 250 kilometres (155 mi) north-west of Brisbane and 6 kilometres (3.7 mi) from the town of Murgon. It is situated on Barambah Creek, close to Bjelke-Petersen Dam.

== History ==
Wakka Wakka (Waka Waka, Wocca Wocca, Wakawaka) is an Australian Aboriginal language spoken in the Burnett River catchment. The Wakka Wakka language region includes the landscape within the local government boundaries of the North and South Burnett Regional Council, particularly the towns of Cherbourg, Murgon, Kingaroy, Gayndah, Eidsvold and Mundubbera.

The town was founded as a settlement for Aboriginal people, known as an Aboriginal reserve, under a policy of segregation being pursued by the Government of Queensland under the Aboriginals Protection and Restriction of the Sale of Opium Act 1897. In 1900, the Salvation Army negotiated for the establishment of the Barambah Aboriginal Settlement, which was gazetted over 7,000 acres (2,800 ha) on 23 February 1901. It was sponsored by the Ipswich Aboriginal Protection Society.

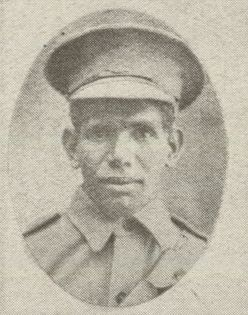
Daniel Cobbo, an Indigenous Soldier of the Australian Light Horse, 1917. Cobbo came from the Barambah Aboriginal Mission.

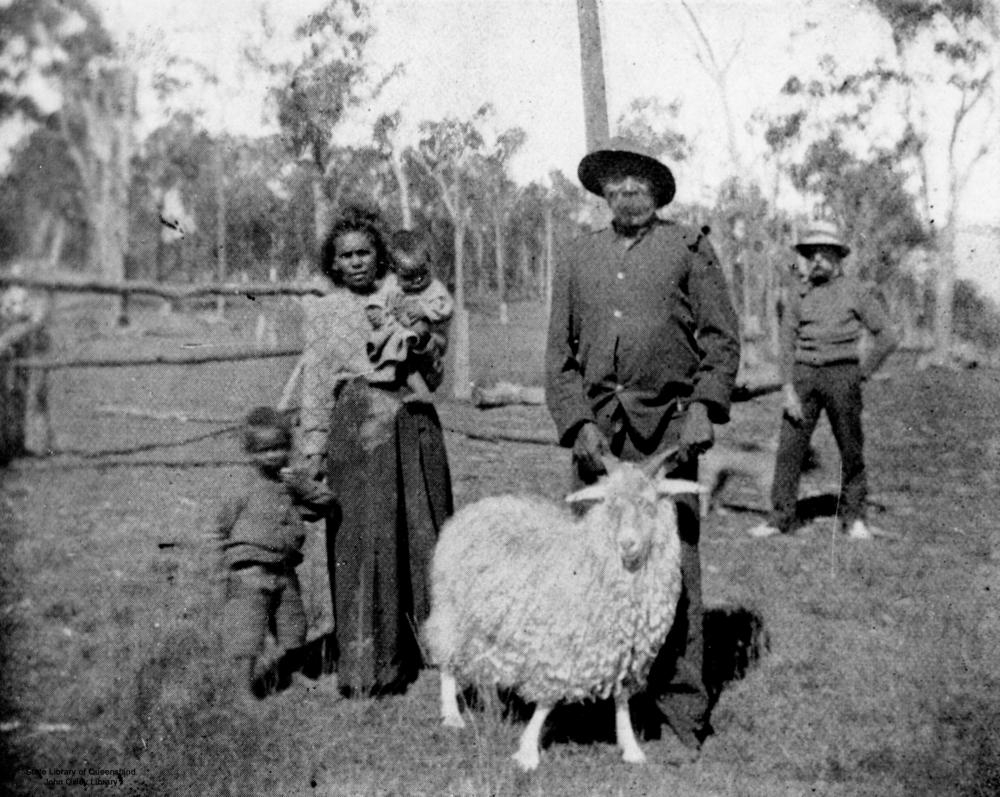
Angora billy goat and goat herd from Barambah Aboriginal Settlement, 1912

It was known as Barambah Aboriginal Settlement from c.1904 to 1932 and then Cherbourg Aboriginal Settlement until 1986. Other names include Barambah Aboriginal Mission, Barambah Aboriginal Reserve, Barambah Mission Reserve and Barambah Mission Station.

The district was renamed Cherbourg on 8 December 1931 to avoid confusion with the mail deliveries to the Barambah pastoral station. The name Cherbourg derives from the parish name, which takes its name from the original 1840s pastoral run name, which is believed to be a corruption of Chirbury, a town in Shropshire, England, the birthplace of pastoralist Richard Jones who leased the pastoral run in the 1850s.

It was initially populated with a few local Aboriginal people, but others from the Esk region and further afield were soon sent to the reserve. Many were forcibly removed from their land and "settled" at Barambah. People from 109 different areas were mixed together and they were not allowed to speak their own languages. The effect of mixing these different groups of people together and forcing them to learn to speak a foreign language (English) has been an almost total loss of their cultural heritage. Many of the languages are considered to be extinct, surviving only in notes and recordings stored at the University of Queensland. The settlement housed a reformatory school and training farm, a home training centre for girls, a hospital, dormitories in which the women and children lived, and churches of various denominations. Training was provided in a variety of agricultural, industrial and domestic fields. People were hired out as cheap labour and at one stage they were not allowed to leave the reserve. In fact, until the referendum in 1967, the Indigenous people at Cherbourg were not even counted in the census.

Barambah Aboriginal School opened in 1904, its name changing to Cherbourg Aboriginal School in 1931–1932. The school was operated by the Department of Native Affairs until the 1960s when it came under the control of Queensland Department of Education and became Cherbourg State School.

The reserve was administered by the Aboriginal Protection Society, Ipswich, until February 1905, when control passed to the Government of Queensland and a Superintendent was appointed, who reported to the Chief Protector of Aborigines. There were approximately 2079 documented removals of Aboriginal people to Barambah between the years of 1905 and 1939.

Cherbourg Provisional School opened in 1932 for the children of the white officials, separate to the school for the Aboriginal children. It closed in 1941.

The Anglican Church of the Holy Spirit was dedicated on 19 February 1939 by the Bishop-Coadjutor. Its closure circa 2018 was approved by Bishop Cameron Venables.

Cherbourg Post Office opened on 15 November 1965 and closed in 1986.

In 1982, Cherbourg was granted a Deed of Grant in Trust (DOGIT), becoming self-managed by its own local authority.

Over the years, the policies towards Aboriginal people changed from protection to assimilation and eventually participation and a measure of self-government with the passage of the Community Services (Aborigines) Act 1984. The Act provided for elected community councils who could make recommendations to the Minister for Community Services on matters relating to the progress, development and wellbeing of the people they represented. On 28 August 1986 a Deed of Grant in Trust was granted to the Cherbourg community, giving this council official status.

The Local Government (Community Government Areas) Act 2004 gave Cherbourg formal legal recognition as a local government.

Alcohol limits were imposed on Cherbourg residents in March 2009 in an attempt to reduce violence. In 2009, then-Mayor Sam Murray claimed the restrictions were not being enforced and the problem was being pushed underground.

In 2022, Fujitsu opened a First Nations Service Centre in Cherbourg. The Service Centre is part of a program to boost the economic development of Queensland First Nations communities through digital skills training and employment opportunities.

=== Truth telling ===
In November 2024, the community held a truth telling event.

== Demographics ==
In the 2006 census, the town of Cherbourg had a population of 1,128 people.

In the 2016 census, the locality of Cherbourg had a population of 1,269 people, of whom 98.7% identified as Indigenous Australians.

In the 2021 census, the locality of Cherbourg had a population of 1,194 people, of whom 1,151 (96.4%) identified as Indigenous Australians.

== Education ==
Cherbourg State School is a government primary (Early Childhood to Year 6) school for boys and girls at 15 Fisher Street (26.2929°S 151.9551°E). In 2018, the school had an enrolment of 130 students with 17 teachers and 40 non-teaching staff (25 full-time equivalent). It includes a special education program. In 2023 the position of Head of Special Education Services was removed by non-Indigenous Principal Mr Boyd McLean and the full-time position of Guidance Officer was reduced to a part-time position. Cherbourg is home to the Nurunderi (meaning taught by Great Spirit) campus of TAFE Queensland South West (26.2951°S 151.9565°E). It offers general courses of study as well as ones specific to Aboriginal and Torres Strait Islanders. All people are welcome to study at this campus.

There is no secondary school in Cherbourg. The nearest government secondary school is Murgon State High School in neighbouring Murgon to the north and Silver Lining Independent School (Secondary) at Ficks Crossing, which adjoins the Cherbourg National Park.

== Amenities ==
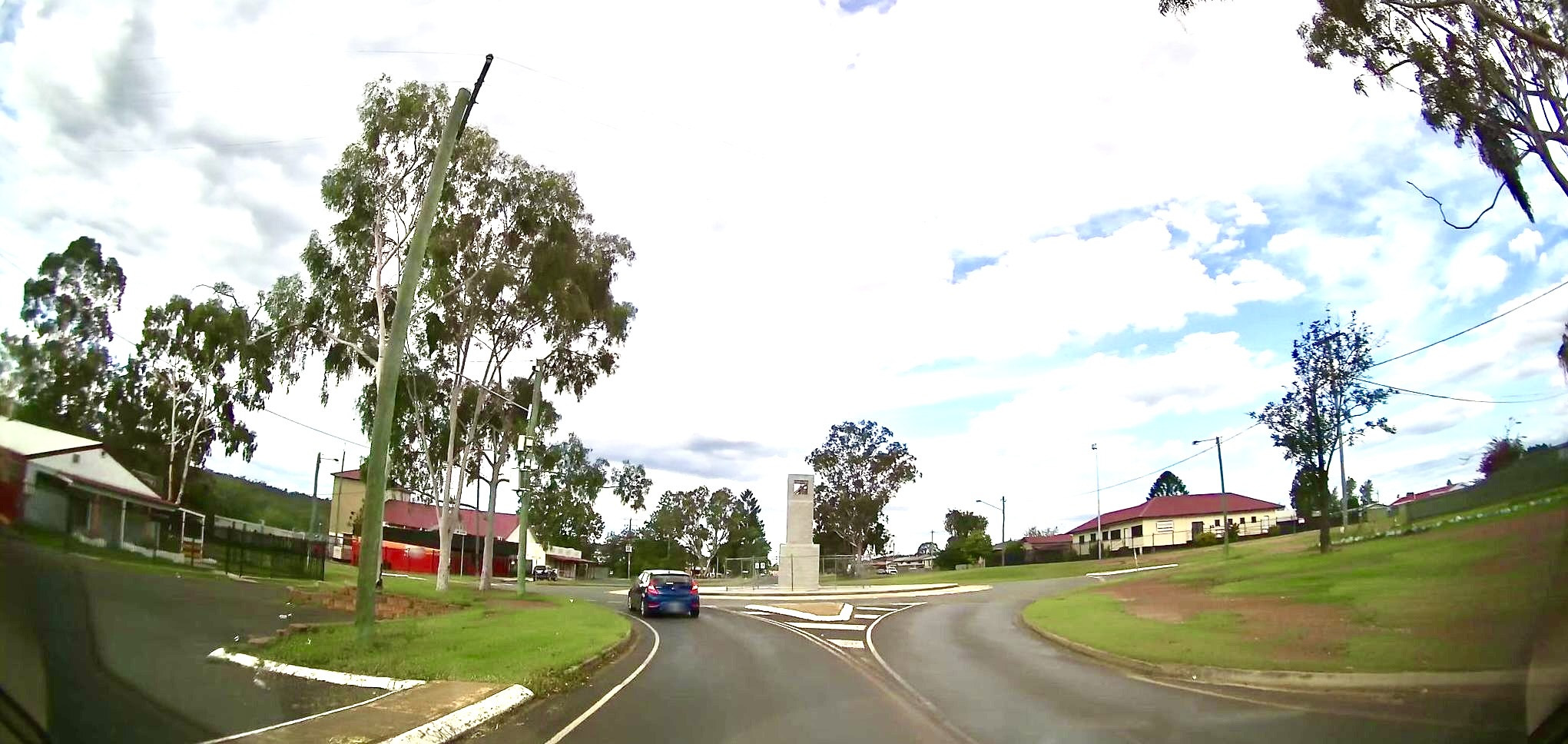
Square in front of the town hall

The Cherbourg Aboriginal Shire Council operates the Winifred Fisher Indigenous Knowledge Centre in the Old Youth Respite Centre, Barambah Road.

== Facilities ==
Other facilities include:

- Cherbourg Police Station (26.2902°S 151.9562°E)
- Cherbourg Fire Station (26.2891°S 151.9567°E)
- Cherbourg SES Facility (26.2878°S 151.9566°E)
- Cherbourg Hospital & Community Health Centre (26.2916°S 151.9569°E) with heliport (26.2912°S 151.9574°E)

== Notable people ==
- Caroline Archer – activist for Aboriginal culture and rights
- Maroochy Barambah – opera singer
- Adrian Blair – Olympic boxer
- Harold Blair – tenor and activist
- Selwyn Cobbo – rugby league player born in Cherbourg
- Marlene Cummins – musician and activist
- Frank Fisher – rugby league player
- Lionel Fogarty – poet and political activist
- Eddie Gilbert – cricket player
- Ruth Hegarty – author
- Albert Henry – cricketer
- Jerry Jerome – boxer
- Jack O'Chin – rugby league player and community leader
- Chris Sandow – rugby league player
- Chris Sarra – Indigenous educator
- Willie Tonga – Australia and Queensland representative rugby league player
- Daniel Alfred Yock – dancer
