= Pat Turner (Aboriginal activist) =

Indigenous Australian activist

- Born: Patricia Ann Turner; 1952 (age 73–74); Alice Springs, Northern Territory, Australia
- Occupations: Civil servant, Indigenous and women's rights activist
- Years active: 1972–present

Patricia Ann Turner AO (born 1952) is a former Australian civil servant, and an advocate for Aboriginal Australian people and women's rights. She worked as a civil administrator for policies which guarantee the right to self-determination for Indigenous people, and became a member of the Order of Australia in 1990 for her service.

== Early life and education ==
Patricia Ann Turner was born in 1952, in Alice Springs, Northern Territory, Australia, to Emma and Alec Turner. Her mother descended of the Gudanji people and her father's family were of Arrernte heritage. The middle child in a family of five siblings, Turner enjoyed reading from a young age. Her father owned his own business, erecting windmills in the area, but was killed in a work-related accident when Turner was 11. In her paternal line, Charles Perkins, was her great-uncle and an influence on her dedication to education and the preservation of Aboriginal laws. Her mother's struggle to receive compensation as a widow and to find permanent employment after her husband's death were important in her development as a feminist.

Turner attended primary schooling in Alice Springs, but continued her schooling at Adelaide Girls High School, boarding in the Church of England Girls' Hostel. Though she missed her immediate family, relatives in the area politicised her, taking her to meetings of the Aboriginal Progress Association. In her junior year, Turner transferred to Nailsworth Girls' Technical High School to learn job skills, and earned her school-leaving certificate. The summer after her graduation, she and other classmates travelled the country working at various posts. In Melbourne during this venture, she applied for a job with the Council of Adult Education, and finished her matriculation.

== Career ==
In 1972, Turner joined the Australian Public Service (APS) and was trained as a community welfare officer for the newly-created Department of Aboriginal Affairs (DAA). The first woman to hold the post in Alice Springs as a welfare officer, Turner worked to build bridges between the Aboriginal community and the government, focusing on programs for at-risk youth and community health and welfare initiatives. In 1976, she enrolled in social work courses at the South Australian Institute of Technology, but became frustrated that the classes approached community challenges with temporary solutions rather than analysing society and suggesting real changes. Joining radical student movements, Turner became involved with the aboriginal rights movement, environmental activism, the trade union movement and the Women's liberation movement. That same year, she was elected as the vice president of the Federal Council for the Advancement of Aborigines and Torres Strait Islanders (FCAATSI), pressing other students to become politically active.

Turner moved to Canberra in 1978 and began working in the Equal Opportunity Branch to assess which jobs within the Public Service Board could be filled by Indigenous people. At the time, the APS recognised only twenty government positions were suited for Aboriginal people, and Turner developed strategies to overcome systemic biases to improve funding and opportunity for Aboriginal Australians. In 1981, Turner became a liaison officer for the Commonwealth Heads of Government Meeting (CHOGM) held in Melbourne, and in 1985 was appointed as director of the Alice Springs office of the DAA. After a year in the post, she was elevated to first assistant secretary of the Economic Development Division of the DAA, where she worked for three years. In 1989, she became Deputy Secretary of DAA. From 1991 to 1992 worked as Deputy Secretary in the Department of the Prime Minister and Cabinet. During this period, she was tasked with overseeing the founding of the Council for Aboriginal Reconciliation and Office of the Status of Women.

In 1994, Turner became the "most senior Indigenous government official in Australia" when she was appointed CEO of the Aboriginal and Torres Strait Islander Commission, making her the first Aboriginal person and the first woman in that position. She served in the post for four years, during which time she completed her master's degree in public administration with the thesis, From paternalism to participation: the role of the Commonwealth in the administration of Aboriginal and Torres Strait Islander affairs policy. After her term, Turner served as the "Monash Chair" of Australian Studies at Georgetown University in Washington D.C. for eighteen months in 1998 and 1999.

Returning to the APS, Turner worked in senior management positions in Centrelink and the Department of Health before retiring from the APS in 2006. From 2006 to 2010, she worked on the development and prepared for the launch of the National Indigenous Television. In 2011, she joined the advisory council of the Australian National Preventative Health Agency, serving until 2016 when she became CEO of the National Aboriginal Community Controlled Health Organisation (NACCHO).

Turner became the lead convenor of the Coalition of Aboriginal and Torres Strait Islander Community-Controlled Peak Organisations (the Coalition of Peaks) in 2019. At its initiative, a historic Partnership Agreement on Closing the Gap was agreed between the Council of Australian Governments (COAG) and the Coalition of Peaks. In 2020 a National Agreement on Closing the Gap was signed by all Australian governments, including 16 targets under the federal government's Closing the Gap strategy and four priority reforms.

In November 2019, it was announced that Turner would be one of 20 members of the Senior Advisory Group to help co-design the Indigenous voice to government set up by Ken Wyatt, the Minister for Indigenous Australians. The Group was co-chaired by Wyatt, Marcia Langton, and Tom Calma.

In March 2026, she announced her retirement as chief convenor of the Coalition of Peaks and CEO of NACCHO.

== Recognition and honours ==
In 1990 Turner honoured as a Member of the Order of Australia (AO) for her dedication to public service.

After the announcement of her retirement, Minister for Indigenous Australians Malarndirri McCarthy and Prime Minister Anthony Albanese paid tribute to her in a media release.

In June 2026 Turner was awarded the highest Australian honour, becoming an Officer of the Order of Australia (AO), for "distinguished service to the Indigenous community through policy development, to governance and leaderships roles, and to improving health outcomes".

At the 2026 National NAIDOC Week Awards in July 2026, Tuner was named NAIDOC Person of the Year, for her "lifelong service".
