= One People of Australia League =

1960s and 70s Aboriginal political group

- Abbreviation: OPAL
- Formation: 1961

The One People of Australia League (often abbreviated OPAL) was an Australian Aboriginal political grouping in the 1960s and the 1970s. In contrast to the more radical and left-wing bodies advocating for indigenous sovereignty at the time, OPAL was for most of its existence overtly assimilationist, advocating for the integration of Aboriginal Australians into mainstream white culture. Its main focus was on welfare and housing and as it received monies from the Queensland government for its programs, the work of OPAL had both equal parts support and criticism for not being independent and operated by non-Indigenous organisers.

== History ==
OPAL was founded by white Australians including Joyce Wilding and Muriel Langford in 1961 in order to facilitate the integration of Aboriginal people in Queensland into a single "multicultural" society. Conservative in outlook from the start, it declined to affiliate itself with the Federal Council for the Advancement of Aborigines and Torres Strait Islanders (FCAATSI), with which it had significant ideological differences. It also had a long standing rivalry with the Queensland Council for the Advancement of Aborigines and Torres Strait Islanders (QCAATSI), which it saw as subversive and communist.

According to a 1969 profile in The Canberra Times, OPAL had a strong focus on Indigenous education, putting on homework classes and night schools to assist Aboriginal schoolchildren, children's art classes, and giving women sewing lessons. The organisation promoted racial integration, putting on concerts in which "European and Aboriginal entertainers perform side by side" and establishing a multiracial beauty pageant, Miss Queensland OPAL. It had a strong presence in Rockhampton, Queensland, where it had established a community hall. Two of the officeholders in Rockhampton were Catholic priests.

In 1972, ALP senator Jim Keeffe described OPAL as a "government front" and accused Queensland's Department of Aboriginal and Island Affairs of interfering in state housing allocations in favour of OPAL members.

== Notable members ==
Neville Bonner was president of OPAL from 1968 to 1974. He was appointed to the Senate in 1971, the first Indigenous Australian to serve in federal parliament. His future Senate colleague Margaret Reynolds was secretary of the Townsville branch of OPAL. She helped established an OPAL-run kindergarten for Aboriginal and Torres Strait Islander children, together with Bobbi Sykes and Eddie Mabo. Reynolds and Sykes were expelled from OPAL in 1967 for their perceived radicalism.

== Housing program ==
In 1962, OPAL purchased a hostel in Russell Street, South Brisbane to provide short term accommodation for homeless Indigenous families, who had moved to Brisbane. It was also a meeting place for Indigenous people. This hostel closed in 1985. In 1970, OPAL purchased a motel in Upper Mount Gravatt, to provide hostel accommodation and offer education and training. This is now known as the OPAL Joyce Wilding hostel.
