= Closing the Gap =

Strategy of Australian governments to improving the lives of Indigenous people

The Closing the Gap framework is a strategy by the Commonwealth and state and territory governments of Australia that aims to reduce disparity between Aboriginal and Torres Strait Islander peoples and non-Indigenous Australians on key health, education and economic opportunity targets. The strategy was launched in 2008 in response to the Close the Gap social justice movement, and revised in 2020 with additional targets and a refreshed strategy.

The Closing the Gap targets relate to life expectancy, child mortality, access to early childhood education, literacy and numeracy at specified school levels, Year 12 attainment, school attendance, and employment outcomes. Annual Closing the Gap reports are presented to federal parliament, providing updates on the agreed targets and related topics. The Closing the Gap Report 2019 reported that of the seven targets, only two – early childhood education and Year 12 attainment – had been met. The remaining targets are not on track to be met within their specified time-frames.

From the adoption of the framework in 2008 until 2018, the federal and state and territory governments worked together via the Council of Australian Governments (COAG) on the framework, with the Department of the Prime Minister and Cabinet producing a report at the end of each year analysing progress on each of its seven targets.

In 2019, the National Indigenous Australians Agency (NIAA) was established and took over reporting and high-level strategy responsibilities. The NIAA works in partnership with the Coalition of Peaks, which represents Aboriginal and Torres Strait Islander organisations, as well as state and territory governments and the Australian Local Government Association, to deliver strategy outcomes.

== History ==
In March 2006, the Steering Committee of the Close the Gap, a social justice campaign focused on Indigenous health, in which "Australia's peak Indigenous and non-Indigenous health bodies, NGOs and human rights organisations are working together to achieve equality in health", first met. Their campaign was launched in April 2007 by patrons Catherine Freeman and Ian Thorpe.

During meetings held in December 2007 and March 2008 the Council of Australian Governments (COAG) adopted six targets to improve the well-being of Indigenous Australians over the next five to twenty years. As part of Prime Minister Kevin Rudd's February 2008 Apology to Indigenous Australians, he pledged the government to bridging the gap between Indigenous and non-Indigenous Australian health, education and living conditions. He also proposed to establish a commission to "close the gap" between Indigenous and non-Indigenous people in "life expectancy, educational achievement and economic opportunity", all in a way that respects their rights to self-determination.

=== 2008–2018 framework ===
The Australian government adopted the goals of the Close the Gap campaign in 2008, in a strategy known as "Closing the Gap". Rudd and Health Minister Nicola Roxon signed the Close the Gap Statement of Intent to close the gap. This document serves two purposes: firstly, as a formal agreement between the Australian government of the day and Aboriginal and Torres Strait Islander peoples; and, secondly, as an embodiment of a human right, a blueprint for achieving health equality. The strategy has been funded by the government to develop a long-term action plan targeted at health services to achieve health equality and life expectancy equality for Aboriginal and Torres Strait Islander people.

=== 2019–2029 framework ===
In the Prime Minister's Foreword to the Closing the Gap Report 2019, Prime Minister Scott Morrison said that while some improvements had been made, including greater retention to Year 12, successive governments had been reporting failure to meet targets. After beginning the process of a Closing the Gap "refresh" two year earlier (after four of the targets were due to expire in 2018), this would be the final report of the framework established in 2008. In December 2018, a coalition of Aboriginal and Torres Strait Islander Australians, the Coalition of Peaks had met with Morrison, and shortly afterwards COAG First Ministers had agreed to a different form of partnership with Indigenous organisations, entailing greater collaboration. In future, there would be a transition to a different phase of Closing the Gap, involving a whole of government approach, with "all governments sharing accountability for progress, and extending this shared accountability to include Aboriginal and Torres Strait Islander people".

A formal partnership between COAG and the Coalition of Aboriginal and Torres Strait Islander Peak Organisations, or Coalition of Peaks, came into effect in March 2019, which included arrangements for a Joint Council on Closing the Gap, enhancing shared decision-making. The Partnership Agreement on Closing the Gap, 2019-2029 was signed by representatives of the Coalition of Peaks, each state and territory government, and the Australian Local Government Association. The Joint Council on Closing the Gap met for the first time on 27 March 2019.

The National Indigenous Australians Agency was established in July 2019, under the Minister for Indigenous Australians, Ken Wyatt, and this agency is now responsible for "lead[ing] and coordinat[ing] the development and implementation of Australia’s Closing the Gap targets in partnership with Indigenous Australians".

== Targets ==
=== 2008 – 2019 ===
During meetings held in December 2007 and March 2008 the Council of Australian Governments (COAG) adopted six targets (later increased to seven) to improve the well-being of Indigenous Australians over the next five to twenty years:

- close the gap in life expectancy by 2031
- halve the gap in child mortality by 2018
- ensure 95 percent of Aboriginal and Torres Strait Islander four-years-olds are enrolled in early childhood education by 2025
- halve the gap in reading, writing and numeracy by 2018
- halve the gap in year 12 attainment by 2020
- halve the gap in employment by 2018.
- close the gap in school attendance by 2018 (this target was added in May 2014)

As of 2019, there have been eleven Closing the Gap Reports presented to Parliament, providing data in areas that previously had none and updates on progress. The Close the Gap campaign has produced 10 reports, including a 10-year review in 2018.

=== 2020 targets ===
The draft targets for 2019 aimed to address multiple areas to improve the lives of Indigenous peoples. These were created by the Council of Australian Governments (COAG) in December 2018, and listed the following areas: families, children and youth; health; education; economic development; housing; justice (including youth justice); land and water ("where Aboriginal and Torres Strait Islander peoples’ land, water and cultural rights are realised"); and cross-system priorities, which "addresses racism, discrimination and social inclusion, healing and trauma, and the promotion of culture and language for Aboriginal and Torres Strait Islander peoples".

==== Justice ====
The new justice targets relate mainly to the levels of incarceration of Indigenous people (in police custody and in the prison system). This matter, along with Aboriginal deaths in custody, was highlighted at the Black Lives Matter rallies around Australia in June 2020. The new Closing The Gap plan proposes that each state and territory would commit to reducing the level of Indigenous youth in detention by 11% to 19%, and to reduce adult imprisonment by 5%. Despite the poor record of achieving targets in past years, Indigenous leaders involved with Closing the Gap believe that the strategies put in place for this round – including implementation plans, accountability and involvement from Aboriginal services – are more likely to bring about the changes needed. Ken Wyatt believes that both law reform and attitudes, such as unconscious bias, are needed, if relationships between police and Indigenous people are to improve.

Western Australia had had some specific issues needing addressing, including systemic discrimination and the matter of jail sentences for unpaid fines. On 17 June 2020 reforms to the legislation relating to the latter was finally passed. Under the new legislation, most fine defaulters will do community service if they fail to pay, with imprisonment a last resort. (Note: Between 1 July 2018 and 30 June 2019, 430 people spent time in custody for unpaid fines.)

==== National agreement: 2020 targets ====
All Australian governments committed to the 16 new targets on 30 July 2020, and signed the National Agreement on Closing the Gap with the Coalition of Peaks, represented by convenor Pat Turner AM. In addition, the new framework for the Closing the Gap strategy, which has bipartisan support, includes far greater Indigenous involvement in leading its implementation and measuring its progress, new accountability mechanisms, and a commitment to address structural racism in government organisations.

The 16 new targets relate to:

1. Close the Gap in life expectancy within a generation, by 2031.
2. By 2031, increase the proportion of Aboriginal and Torres Strait Islander babies with a healthy birthweight to 91 per cent.
3. By 2025, increase the proportion of Aboriginal and Torres Strait Islander children enrolled in Year Before Fulltime Schooling (YBFS) early childhood education to 95 per cent.
4. By 2031, increase the proportion of Aboriginal and Torres Strait Islander children assessed as developmentally on track in all five domains of the Australian Early Development Census (AEDC) to 55 per cent.
5. By 2031, increase the proportion of Aboriginal and Torres Strait Islander people (age 20-24) attaining year 12 or equivalent qualification to 96 per cent.
6. By 2031, increase the proportion of Aboriginal and Torres Strait Islander people aged 25-34 years who have completed a tertiary qualification (Certificate III and above) to 70 per cent.
7. By 2031, increase the proportion of Aboriginal and Torres Strait Islander youth (15–24 years) who are in employment, education or training to 67 per cent.
8. By 2031, increase the proportion of Aboriginal and Torres Strait Islander people aged 25–64 who are employed to 62 per cent
9. By 2031, increase the proportion of Aboriginal and Torres Strait Islander people living in appropriately sized (not overcrowded) housing to 88 per cent.
10. By 2031, reduce the rate of Aboriginal and Torres Strait Islander adults held in incarceration by at least 15 per cent.
11. By 2031, reduce the rate of Aboriginal and Torres Strait Islander young people (10-17 years) in detention by at least 30 per cent.
12. By 2031, reduce the rate of over-representation of Aboriginal and Torres Strait Islander children in out-of-home care by 45 per cent.
13. By 2031, the rate of all forms of family violence and abuse against Aboriginal and Torres Strait Islander women and children is reduced at least by 50%, as progress towards zero.
14. Significant and sustained reduction in suicide of Aboriginal and Torres Strait Islander people towards zero.
15. a) By 2030, a 15 per cent increase in Australia's landmass subject to Aboriginal and Torres Strait Islander people's legal rights or interests.

b) By 2030, a 15 per cent increase in areas covered by Aboriginal and Torres Strait Islander people's legal rights or interests in the sea.

16. By 2031, there is a sustained increase in number and strength of Aboriginal and Torres Strait Islander languages being spoken.

A 17th target was later added:

17: By 2026, Aboriginal and Torres Strait Islander people have equal levels of digital inclusion.

There was no funding as yet allocated to support the agreement. The announcement was on the whole well-received. Shadow minister for Indigenous affairs, Linda Burney, welcomed the targets and involvement of Indigenous representatives, but hoped for more federal funding and also to work towards a target relating to domestic violence.

Megan Davis, Pro Vice-Chancellor Indigenous UNSW, criticised aspects of the agreement, in particular the notion that the involvement of the Coalition of Peaks provides a "voice" and thus represents self-determination. She points out that these bodies are contracted service providers, relying on government funds to run their organisations. She says "Unlike the Uluru dialogues that invited communities to imagine and design their futures using the platform of constitutional change, the Coalition of Peaks closing-the-gap process is about refreshing a flawed policy".

=== 2021 implementation plan and funding ===
In August 2021 Prime Minister Scott Morrison announced a new implementation plan worth A$1 billion towards meeting the targets in health, education, justice, and employment by 2031. The funding includes $378 million for a compensation and healing fund for Stolen Generations survivors from the Northern Territory, Australian Capital Territory and Jervis Bay Territory, as well as an injection of funds into repairing and building new health clinics; alcohol and drug rehabilitation programs; job creation; various justice measures; and remote boarding schools.

=== 2023 implementation plan ===
The second implementation plan was published by the Coalition of Peaks under the "National Agreement", covering the period February 2023–January 2024.

== Progress ==
=== 2008–2020 ===
As of 2019, there had been eleven Closing the Gap Reports presented to Parliament, providing data in areas that previously had none and updates on progress.

In 2018, the government's ten-year progress report against the key areas of the framework indicated that only three of the target areas were likely to be met, with ongoing concerns in areas such as education and school attendance, and health.

The 10-year review (Close The Gap - 10 Year Review) published by the Close the Gap campaign in 2018, assessing the progress of the Closing the Gap strategy, included major findings as follows:

*the Close the Gap Statement of Intent (and close the gap approach) has to date only been partially and incoherently implemented via the Closing the Gap Strategy...

- Closing the Gap Strategy – a 25-year program – was effectively abandoned after five-years and so cannot be said to have been anything but partially implemented in itself. This is because the ‘architecture’ to support the Closing the Gap Strategy (national approach, national leadership, funding agreements) had unraveled by 2014-2015...
- a refreshed Closing the Gap Strategy requires a reset which re-builds the requisite ‘architecture’ (national approach, national leadership, outcome-orientated funding agreements). National priorities like addressing Aboriginal and Torres Strait Islander health inequality have not gone away, are getting worse, and more than ever require a national response...
- a refreshed Closing the Gap Strategy must be founded on implementing the existing Close the Gap Statement of Intent commitments... refreshed Closing the Gap Strategy must focus on delivering equality of opportunity in relation to health goods and services, especially primary health care, according to need and in relation to health infrastructure (an adequate and capable health workforce, housing, food, water). This should be in addition to the focus on maternal and infant health, chronic disease and other health needs. The social determinants of health inequality (income, education, racism) must be addressed...
- there is a ‘funding myth’ about Aboriginal and Torres Strait Islander health – indeed in many Indigenous Affairs areas – that must be confronted as it impedes progress. That is the idea of dedicated health expenditure being a waste of taxpayer funds... Aboriginal and Torres Strait Islander population have, on average, 2.3 times the disease burden of non-Indigenous people. Yet on a per person basis, Australian government health expenditure was $1.38 per Aboriginal and Torres Strait Islander person for every $1.00 spent per non-Indigenous person in 2013-14...

The Closing the Gap Report 2019 reported that of the seven targets, only two – early childhood education and Year 12 attainment – had been met. Aims to halve the gap in child mortality by 2018, close the gap on school attendance by 2018, close the gap in life expectancy by 2031, halve the gap in literacy and numeracy by 2018 and halve the gap in unemployment by 2018 were not on track.

The Closing the Gap Report 2020 shows little progress on any of the targets, with still only two of the seven targets having been met (four having expired in 2018). The Prime Minister's foreword says that the final results of the evidence of the previous twelve years are not had been hoped for, but that there were stories and successes worth celebrating, and some progress on almost every measure, including the key areas of health and education. Morrison wrote that "the new framework is based on true partnership...".

=== Measuring the new strategy ===
Starting in July 2021, a new report entitled Closing the Gap Annual Data Compilation Report is published annually by the Productivity Commission. However, as there was no data available for 10 of the 17 socio-economic targets of the 2020 Agreement since their baseline year, and for other reasons relating to data quality, it is not yet possible to assess progress properly. However, targets on healthy birth weight, attendance at early childhood education, and reducing the number of teenagers in the youth justice system are on track.

== Focus areas ==
=== Health ===
Aboriginal and Torres Strait Islander peoples have a significantly lower life expectancy and higher burden of disease than non-Indigenous Australians. In 2020, Indigenous Australians expected to live 7.8 years for females, and 8.6 years for males, less than the non-Indigenous population. Both social and institutional determinants of health have been targets of improvement, with a lack of access to primary and tertiary health services, lower standards of infrastructure, and poor access to quality, fit-for-purpose housing, nutrition and water supply in Indigenous communities. Greater socioeconomic disadvantage as a result also predisposes Indigenous Australians to behavioural risk factors, such as alcohol abuse due to a lack of mental health services, and environmental risks such as poor nutrition due to relative remoteness and inaccessibility of some communities.

Major contributing factors to Indigenous Australians' lower life expectancy and poorer health outcomes originate from the effects of colonisation, and institutional and interpersonal racism from organisations and practitioners. Between one third and one half of the life expectancy gap may be explained by differences in the social determinants of health. They affect the health of people and can also influence how a person interacts with health and other services. For example, Aboriginal and Torres Strait Islander adults are less likely to smoke if they have completed Year 12, are employed and if they have higher incomes. Additionally, higher levels of education are associated with healthier lifestyle choices and improved health literacy.

=== Education ===
Closing the Gap has focused on improving education for Indigenous people, with some success. Attainment of Year 12 or equivalent for ages 20–24 has increased from 47.4% in 2006 to 65.3% in 2016. This has led to more Indigenous people undertaking higher or vocational education courses. According to the Closing the Gap report, Indigenous students in higher education award courses more than doubled in number over the decade from 2006 (9,329) to 2017 (19,237).

However, most of the Closing the Gap targets for education are not on track. In general, the gaps have improved (such as in NAPLAN results) or not devolved (school attendance rate remaining stable for several years) have not met targets. Remoteness seems to be a factor; students in isolated or remote communities do not perform or attend as well as students in urban areas. The Closing the Gap Report 2019 reported that of the seven targets, only two – early childhood education and Year 12 attainment – had been met. Only Year 9 numeracy was on track in all states and territories, with variations among them.

=== Employment ===
The target to halve the gap in employment by 2018 is not on track; the gap has actually widened. The overall rate of employment for Indigenous Australians had risen by at least 4%, and that in remote areas by about 11% between 2006 and 2016.

== See also ==
- Closing the Gaps – a similar New Zealand policy
- Health care in Australia
- Indigenous Australians and crime
- New World syndrome, diseases brought on by changes in diet and lifestyle
- Reconciliation in Australia, government policy since 1991
