= Klugman =

Klugman is a surname. Notable people with the surname include:

- Adam Klugman (born 1963), media strategist and campaign consultant
- Brian Klugman (born 1975), American actor
- Dick Klugman (1924–2011), Austrian-born Australian politician
- Hannah Klugman (born 2009), British tennis player
- Jack Klugman (1922-2012), American stage, film and television actor
- Jeni Klugman, female development economist
- Kristine Klugman, Australian academic
- Patrick Klugman (born 1977), French attorney and politician

== See also ==
- Jaklin Klugman (1977–1996), American Thoroughbred racehorse
- Klugmann
- Kligman
