= Electoral results for the Division of Prospect =

Australian division election results

This is a list of electoral results for the Division of Prospect (an Australian Electoral Division in the state of New South Wales) from the electorate's creation in 1969 until its abolition in 2010.

== Members ==
Member	Party	Term
Dick Klugman	Labor	1969–1990
Janice Crosio	Labor	1990–2004
Chris Bowen	Labor	2004–2010

== Election results ==
=== Elections in the 2000s ===
==== 2007 ====
2007 Australian federal election: Prospect
Party	Candidate	Votes	%	±%
Labor	Chris Bowen	46,135	58.18	+9.11
Liberal	Lily Arthur	24,705	31.15	−7.16
Greens	Lizza Gebilagin	3,618	4.56	−0.61
Family First	Carolyn Lever	2,655	3.35	+3.27
Christian Democrats	Jason Callander	2,187	2.76	−0.55
Total formal votes		79,300	92.27	+1.68
Informal votes		6,648	7.73	−1.68
Turnout		85,948	94.84	+0.90
Two-party-preferred result
Labor	Chris Bowen	50,327	63.46	+7.06
Liberal	Lily Arthur	28,973	36.54	−7.06
Labor hold		Swing	+7.06	

==== 2004 ====
2004 Australian federal election: Prospect
Party	Candidate	Votes	%	±%
Labor	Chris Bowen	37,802	50.07	−5.29
Liberal	Robert Jacobucci	28,828	38.19	+10.54
Greens	Kelly Marks	4,009	5.31	+0.73
Christian Democrats	Manny Poularas	2,285	3.03	+0.47
One Nation	John Abromas	1,438	1.90	−2.60
Democrats	Lily Arthur	1,131	1.50	−0.79
Total formal votes		75,493	90.76	−0.25
Informal votes		7,906	9.24	+0.25
Turnout		83,183	95.03	−0.26
Two-party-preferred result
Labor	Chris Bowen	43,119	57.12	−5.69
Liberal	Robert Jacobucci	32,374	42.88	+5.69
Labor hold		Swing	−5.69	

==== 2001 ====
2001 Australian federal election: Prospect
Party	Candidate	Votes	%	±%
Labor	Janice Crosio	41,596	55.36	−1.23
Liberal	Gareth Perkins	20,776	27.65	+1.98
Greens	Rebecca Filipczyk	3,439	4.58	+3.07
One Nation	John Hutchinson	3,380	4.50	−3.19
Christian Democrats	Lewis Haroon	1,927	2.56	+2.31
Democrats	Thomas Peacock	1,723	2.29	−2.60
AAFI	Garry Oates	1,274	1.70	+1.70
Unity	Kek Tai	1,027	1.37	−1.43
Total formal votes		75,142	91.05	−2.64
Informal votes		7,388	8.95	+2.64
Turnout		82,530	95.60	
Two-party-preferred result
Labor	Janice Crosio	47,197	62.81	−3.96
Liberal	Gareth Perkins	27,945	37.19	+3.96
Labor hold		Swing	−3.96	

=== Elections in the 1990s ===
==== 1998 ====
1998 Australian federal election: Prospect
Party	Candidate	Votes	%	±%
Labor	Janice Crosio	41,310	59.54	+2.86
Liberal	Nahid Aziz	15,965	23.01	−8.97
One Nation	John Hutchinson	5,199	7.49	+7.49
Democrats	Manny Poularas	3,405	4.91	−5.11
Unity	Somchai Tongsumrith	2,199	3.17	+3.17
Greens	Chris Harris	1,074	1.55	+1.55
Natural Law	Linda Cogger	235	0.34	−0.99
Total formal votes		69,387	93.52	−0.71
Informal votes		4,806	6.48	+0.71
Turnout		74,193	95.08	−1.19
Two-party-preferred result
Labor	Janice Crosio	48,371	69.71	+5.81
Liberal	Nahid Aziz	21,016	30.29	−5.81
Labor hold		Swing	+5.81	

==== 1996 ====
1996 Australian federal election: Prospect
Party	Candidate	Votes	%	±%
Labor	Janice Crosio	39,318	56.68	−8.69
Liberal	Ron Cameron	22,182	31.97	+5.86
Democrats	Manny Poularas	6,951	10.02	+5.50
Natural Law	Linda Cogger	922	1.33	+0.74
Total formal votes		69,373	94.23	−0.15
Informal votes		4,248	5.77	+0.15
Turnout		73,621	96.28	+0.14
Two-party-preferred result
Labor	Janice Crosio	44,236	63.91	−5.13
Liberal	Ron Cameron	24,984	36.09	+5.13
Labor hold		Swing	−5.13	

==== 1993 ====
1993 Australian federal election: Prospect
Party	Candidate	Votes	%	±%
Labor	Janice Crosio	44,039	65.37	+9.78
Liberal	Paul Newton	17,593	26.11	−4.09
Democrats	Dick Pike	3,044	4.52	−5.02
Independent	Norman Byleveld	777	1.15	+1.15
	Sue Bull	763	1.13	+1.13
Independent	Alan Byers	757	1.12	+1.12
Natural Law	Reg Paling	397	0.59	+0.59
Total formal votes		67,370	94.38	+0.32
Informal votes		4,015	5.62	−0.32
Turnout		71,385	96.14	
Two-party-preferred result
Labor	Janice Crosio	46,451	69.04	+5.59
Liberal	Paul Newton	20,834	30.96	−5.59
Labor hold		Swing	+5.59	

==== 1990 ====
1990 Australian federal election: Prospect
Party	Candidate	Votes	%	±%
Labor	Janice Crosio	37,866	56.0	+3.8
Liberal	Paul Newton	20,058	29.7	+1.5
Democrats	Kate Wright	6,639	9.8	+4.8
Australian Gruen	Jenny Zanella	1,455	2.2	+2.2
Democratic Socialist	Dick Nichols	920	1.4	+1.4
Independent	Nick Beams	648	1.0	+1.0
Total formal votes		67,586	94.0	
Informal votes		4,352	6.0	
Turnout		71,938	94.7	
Two-party-preferred result
Labor	Janice Crosio	43,157	64.0	+0.0
Liberal	Paul Newton	24,282	36.0	+0.0
Labor hold		Swing	+0.0	

=== Elections in the 1980s ===
==== 1987 ====
1987 Australian federal election: Prospect
Party	Candidate	Votes	%	±%
Labor	Dick Klugman	33,367	52.2	−13.8
Liberal	Robert Ingram	18,018	28.2	+0.6
Independent	Sam Barone	9,354	14.6	+14.6
Democrats	William Utterson	3,194	5.0	−0.1
Total formal votes		63,933	92.9	
Informal votes		5,645	8.1	
Turnout		69,578	93.4	
Two-party-preferred result
Labor	Dick Klugman	40,861	63.9	−5.4
Liberal	Robert Ingram	23,038	36.1	+5.4
Labor hold		Swing	−5.4	

==== 1984 ====
1984 Australian federal election: Prospect
Party	Candidate	Votes	%	±%
Labor	Dick Klugman	38,475	66.0	+0.9
Liberal	Adrian Burke	16,085	27.6	−4.5
Democrats	Robert Neesam	2,987	5.1	+5.1
Socialist Workers	Dick Nichols	791	1.4	−0.4
Total formal votes		58,338	89.4	
Informal votes		6,932	10.6	
Turnout		65,270	92.8	
Two-party-preferred result
Labor	Dick Klugman	40,474	69.4	+2.2
Liberal	Adrian Burke	17,841	30.6	−2.2
Labor hold		Swing	+2.2	

==== 1983 ====
1983 Australian federal election: Prospect
Party	Candidate	Votes	%	±%
Labor	Dick Klugman	46,793	63.1	+5.2
Liberal	Alan Byers	25,315	34.1	−2.5
Socialist Workers	Richard Nichols	1,320	1.8	+1.8
Independent	Eric Viitala	714	1.0	−0.4
Total formal votes		74,142	96.1	
Informal votes		3,047	3.9	
Turnout		77,189	93.9	
Two-party-preferred result
Labor	Dick Klugman		65.2	+4.0
Liberal	Alan Byers		34.8	−4.0
Labor hold		Swing	+4.0	

==== 1980 ====
1980 Australian federal election: Prospect
Party	Candidate	Votes	%	±%
Labor	Dick Klugman	39,419	57.9	+3.3
Liberal	Alan Byers	24,967	36.6	+3.3
Democrats	Robert Goodere	3,751	5.5	−6.1
Total formal votes		68,137	95.5	
Informal votes		3,227	4.5	
Turnout		71,364	93.3	
Two-party-preferred result
Labor	Dick Klugman		61.2	+1.3
Liberal	Alan Byers		38.8	−1.3
Labor hold		Swing	+1.3	

=== Elections in the 1970s ===
==== 1977 ====
1977 Australian federal election: Prospect
Party	Candidate	Votes	%	±%
Labor	Dick Klugman	34,933	54.6	−5.4
Liberal	Alan Byers	21,591	33.8	−4.3
Democrats	Laurence Bourke	7,421	11.6	+11.6
Total formal votes		63,945	95.9	
Informal votes		2,731	4.1	
Turnout		66,676	94.1	
Two-party-preferred result
Labor	Dick Klugman		59.9	−1.2
Liberal	Alan Byers		40.1	+1.2
Labor hold		Swing	−1.2	

==== 1975 ====
1975 Australian federal election: Prospect
Party	Candidate	Votes	%	±%
Labor	Dick Klugman	38,487	57.0	−10.4
Liberal	Donald MacDonald	27,695	41.1	+11.1
Australia	Geoffrey Thomas	1,284	1.9	−0.7
Total formal votes		67,466	97.1	
Informal votes		1,983	2.9	
Turnout		69,449	94.9	
Two-party-preferred result
Labor	Dick Klugman		58.1	−10.9
Liberal	Donald MacDonald		41.9	+10.9
Labor hold		Swing	−10.9	

==== 1974 ====
1974 Australian federal election: Prospect
Party	Candidate	Votes	%	±%
Labor	Dick Klugman	44,082	67.4	+2.5
Liberal	Donald MacDonald	19,591	30.0	+1.1
Australia	Geoffrey Thomas	1,693	2.6	+2.6
Total formal votes		65,366	97.7	
Informal votes		1,513	2.3	
Turnout		66,879	95.4	
Two-party-preferred result
Labor	Dick Klugman		69.0	+3.1
Liberal	Donald MacDonald		31.0	−3.1
Labor hold		Swing	+3.1	

==== 1972 ====
1972 Australian federal election: Prospect
Party	Candidate	Votes	%	±%
Labor	Dick Klugman	37,242	64.9	+7.9
Liberal	Stanislaus Kelly	16,577	28.9	−4.9
Democratic Labor	William Dunbar	3,523	6.1	−3.1
Total formal votes		57,342	97.0	
Informal votes		1,766	3.0	
Turnout		59,108	95.6	
Two-party-preferred result
Labor	Dick Klugman		65.9	+7.3
Liberal	Stanislaus Kelly		34.1	−7.3
Labor hold		Swing	+7.3	

=== Elections in the 1960s ===
==== 1969 ====
1969 Australian federal election: Prospect
Party	Candidate	Votes	%	±%
Labor	Dick Klugman	28,155	57.0	+6.2
Liberal	Stanislaus Kelly	16,687	33.8	−6.2
Democratic Labor	John Ferguson	4,517	9.2	+3.9
Total formal votes		49,359	96.6	
Informal votes		1,758	3.4	
Turnout		51,117	94.3	
Two-party-preferred result
Labor	Dick Klugman		58.6	+5.3
Liberal	Stanislaus Kelly		41.4	−5.3
Labor notional hold		Swing	+5.3	
