= Kligman =

Kligman is a surname of Jewish origin.

Notable people with the surname include:

- Albert Kligman (1916–2010), American dermatologist
- Marc Kligman (born 1970), American sports agent
- Mark Kligman (born 1962), American music school Chair
- Paul Kligman (1923–1985), Canadian actor
- Ruth Kligman (1930–2010), American abstract artist

== See also ==
- Klugman
