= List of University of Canberra people =

This is an incomplete list of University of Canberra people, including notable alumni and staff.

== Alumni ==
=== Business ===
- Betty Kitchener, founder of mental health first aid training and CEO of Mental Health First Aid International
- Deborah Schofield, director of the Centre for Economic Impacts of Genomic Medicine, Macquarie University
- Vivek Wadhwa, technology entrepreneur and academic

=== Government ===
- Simon Corbell, Labor member of the Australian Capital Territory Legislative Assembly and former Attorney-General and senior Minister
- Kelly Hoare, former member of the Australian House of Representatives
- Virginia Judge, former Member for Strathfield and former NSW Minister for Fair Trading, Citizenship and Minister Assisting The Premier on the Arts
- Ben Small, former Liberal Senator for Western Australia
- Ursula Stephens, former Senator for New South Wales and former Parliamentary Secretary for Social Inclusion and the Voluntary Sector
- Dr Lotay Tshering, former Prime Minister of Bhutan
- Steve Whan, Member for Monaro and NSW Minister for Skills and TAFE
- Kristy McBain, member of the Australian House of Representatives and minister in the Albanese government
- Rosalie Woodruff, epidemiologist and leader of the Tasmanian Greens
- Natasha Fyles, former Chief Minister of the Northern Territory
- Nichole Overall, Member for Monaro in the New South Wales Legislative Council in 2022

=== Humanities ===
- Matt Worley, rugby player
- Wil Anderson, comedian
- Adam Boland, producer Sunrise, Weekend Sunrise and The Morning Show – Channel Seven.
- Genesis Owusu, singer and four-time ARIA Music Awards winner
- Justin Heazlewood, aka The Bedroom Philosopher, comedian/folk singer
- Cate Kennedy, author
- Garth Nix, author
- Jonathan Uptin, weekend presenter of Nine News Queensland
- David Vernon, writer
- JG Montgomery, author

=== Law ===
- Shane Drumgold SC, lawyer, former Director of Public Prosecutions (ACT)

=== Pageantry ===
- Hannah Arnold, beauty pageant titleholder crowned Binibining Pilipinas International 2021

=== Sport ===
- Ben Alexander, Australian rugby union player, former Captain of The University of Canberra Brumbies
- Maitlan Brown, Australia, Melbourne Renegades and NSW Breakers cricketer
- Nathan Deakes, Olympic athlete and medallist, World Champion and World record holder in the 50 km Walk
- Scott Fava, Western Force rugby union player
- George Gregan, former captain, Australian national rugby union team
- Joshua Katz (born 1997), Olympic judoka
- Lee Lai Shan, Olympics gold medalist in windsurfing
- Petria Thomas, Olympic swimmer and multiple gold medal winner
- Alan Tongue, Canberra Raiders rugby league player

== Honorary appointments ==
=== Emeritus professors ===
- Ann Harding, economist and inaugural director of the university's National Centre for Social and Economic Modelling. The Ann Harding Conference Centre is named in her honour
- Patrick Dunleavy, political scientist and ANZSOG Institute for Governance Centenary Chair

=== Doctoral fellows ===
- Michelle Grattan, journalist and chief political correspondent of The Conversation
- Elizabeth Grant, anthropologist, criminologist, and academic in Indigenous architecture and human rights
- Donald Horne, journalist, author, public intellectual, and chancellor
- Karen Middleton, journalist

== Staff ==
- Tom Calma, human rights advocate and second Indigenous Australian university chancellor
- Kim Rubenstein, legal scholar and co-director of the 50/50 by 2030 Foundation
- Frank Bongiorno, historian and director of the Vice-Chancellor's Centre for Public Ideas

== Administration ==
=== Chancellors ===
Order	Chancellor	Academic qualifications	Term start	Term end	Notes
1	Dr Doug Waterhouse, CMG AO ForMemRS	BSc, MSc, DSc (Sydney)	1990	1992	
2	Donald Horne, AO		1992	1995	
3	Wendy McCarthy, AO	BA, DipEd (New England)	1996	2005	
4	Ingrid Moses	DiplSozWirt (FAU), MA (UQ), GDipTerEd (DDIAE), PhD (UQ)	2006	2010	
5	Dr John McKay, AO	BA (Canberra)	2011	2013	
6	Dr Tom Calma, AO, FAA, FAHA, FASSA	AssocDipCommDev (SAIT), AssocDipSocWork (SAIT)	2014	2023	
7	Lisa Paul, AO, PSM	BA (Hons) (ANU)	2024	incumbent	

=== Vice-Chancellors ===
Order	Vice-Chancellor	Academic qualifications	Term start	Term end	Notes
1	Dr Roger Scott	BA (Tasmania)	1989	1990	
2	Don Aitkin, AO	MA (New England), PhD (ANU)	1991	2002	
3	Dr Roger Dean	PhD (Cambridge)	2002	2007	
4	Dr Stephen Parker, AO	LL.B (Newcastle-upon-Tyne), PhD (Wales)	2007	2016	
5	Dr Deep Saini	PhD (Adelaide)	2016	2020	
6	Dr Paddy Nixon	B.Sc. (Liverpool), PhD (Sheffeld), MA (Dublin)	2020	2023	
interim	Dr Lucy Johnston	BA (Hons) (UO), MA (UO), PhD (University of Bristol)	2023	2024	
interim	Dr Stephen Parker, AO	LL.B (Newcastle-upon-Tyne), PhD (Wales)	2024	2025	
7	Hon. Bill Shorten	BA, LLB (Monash), MBA (MBS)	2025		
