= 2019 Australian Labor Party leadership election =

- 30 May 2019
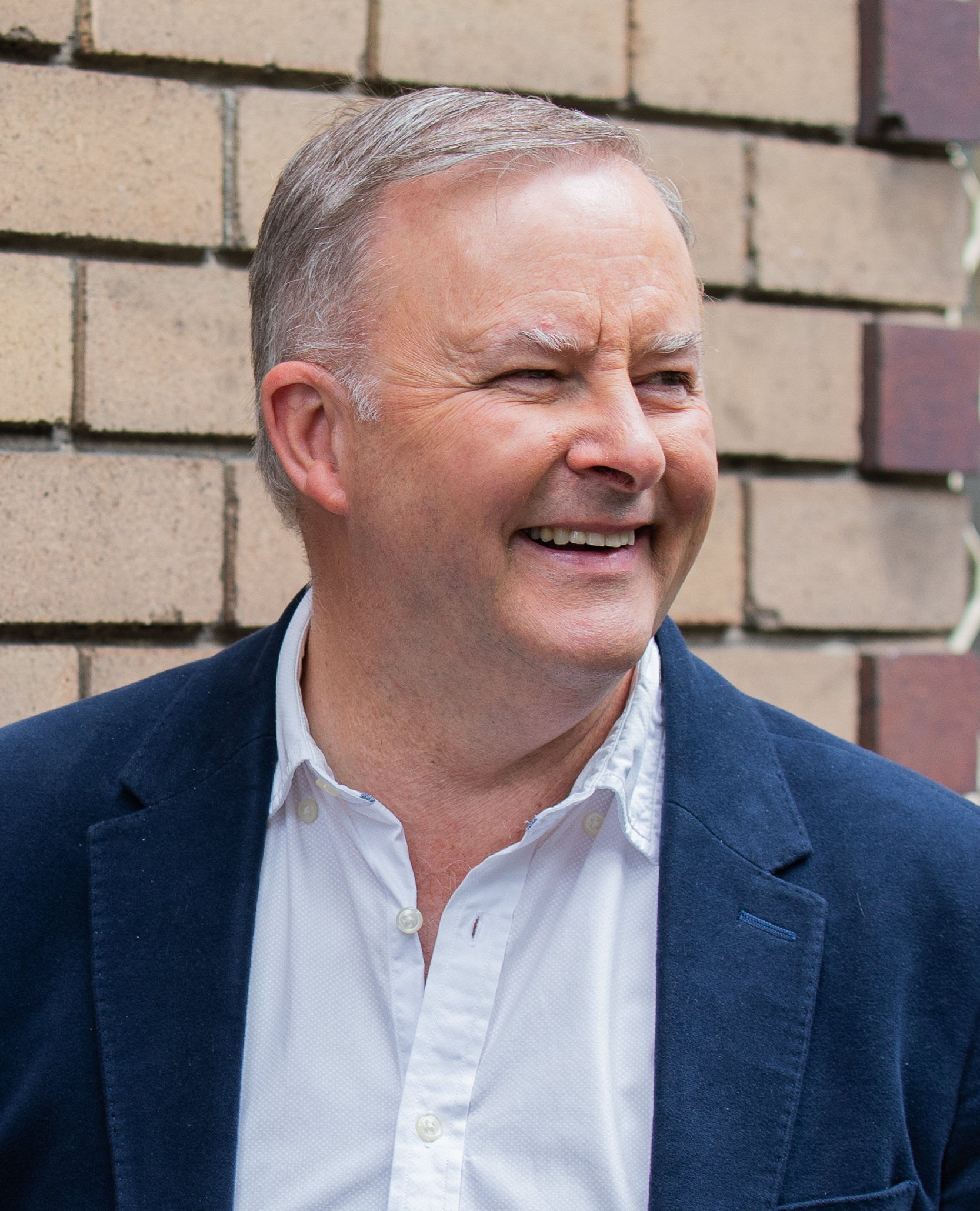
| Candidate | Anthony Albanese |
| Result | Unopposed |
| Seat | Grayndler (NSW) |
| Faction | Left |
Leader before election
Bill Shorten
Elected Leader
Anthony Albanese

A leadership election was held in May 2019 to determine the successor to Bill Shorten as leader of the Australian Labor Party and Leader of the Opposition. Shorten announced his pending resignation on 18 May, following Labor's surprise defeat in the 2019 federal election. The leadership was confirmed unopposed; Anthony Albanese was elected as Leader, with Richard Marles elected Deputy Leader.

The day after the general election, Albanese, a member of the party's left-faction, announced his candidacy for the leadership. He had run for the role in the party's previous leadership election in 2013 but was defeated by Bill Shorten. On 21 May Chris Bowen announced he would also contest the ballot; however the next day he announced his withdrawal, citing lack of support among the party membership. Several other Labor MPs such as Tanya Plibersek and Jim Chalmers considered nominating for the leadership, but decided not to stand. Albanese was the only person to have declared his candidacy at the time when nominations closed on 27 May 2019. Consequently, he was formally appointed to the role when the Labor Party caucus met later on 30 May; at which point Shorten's leadership expired and Albanese's term commenced.

== Process ==
Under party rules implemented by then-Prime Minister Kevin Rudd after the June 2013 leadership spill, candidates had one week after the formal declaration to nominate themselves for the election. In cases where the election is held as a result of vacancy, candidates were required to receive the support of 20% of the federal Labor caucus to be eligible for nomination. If two or more candidates are successfully nominated, ballot papers are issued to party members who have two weeks to return them, at which point Labor MPs and Senators cast their votes for the position. According to the party's rules the two voting blocs are weighted equally, with the parliamentary caucus and the party members each representing 50%.

As Albanese was the only candidate to have declared when nominations closed at 10:00am on Monday, 27 May, he was formally elected to the leadership alongside deputy leader Richard Marles later that week when the party caucus met to confirm the new Shadow Ministry. Victorian MP Clare O'Neil considered running for the deputy leadership in competition with Marles, though later announced she would not run for the position.

== Candidates ==
=== Declared ===
| Name | Positions | Faction | Announced |
|---|---|---|---|
| Anthony Albanese | Shadow Minister for Infrastructure, Transport, Cities and Regional Development (2016–2022); Shadow Minister for Tourism (2013–2022); Deputy Prime Minister (2013); MP for Grayndler, NSW (1996–present) | Left | 19 May 2019 |

=== Withdrew ===
| Name | Positions | Faction | Announced | Withdrew |
|---|---|---|---|---|
| Chris Bowen | Interim leader (2013); Shadow Treasurer (2013–2019); Treasurer (2013); MP for Prospect, NSW (2004–2010) MP for McMahon, NSW (2010–present) | Right | 21 May 2019 | 22 May 2019 |

=== Declined ===
- Tony Burke, Manager of Opposition Business in the House (2013–2022) (endorsed Albanese)
- Jim Chalmers, Shadow Minister for Finance (2016–2019) (endorsed Albanese)
- Joel Fitzgibbon, Shadow Minister for Agriculture (2013–2022) (endorsed Albanese)
- Richard Marles, Shadow Minister for Defence (2016–2022) (elected Deputy Leader)
- Tanya Plibersek, Deputy Leader of the Opposition (2013–2019)
- Penny Wong, Leader of the Opposition in the Senate (2013–2022) (endorsed Albanese)

== See also ==
- 2019 Australian federal election
