= Bill Shorten =

Australian former politician (born 1967)

The Honourable Bill Shorten
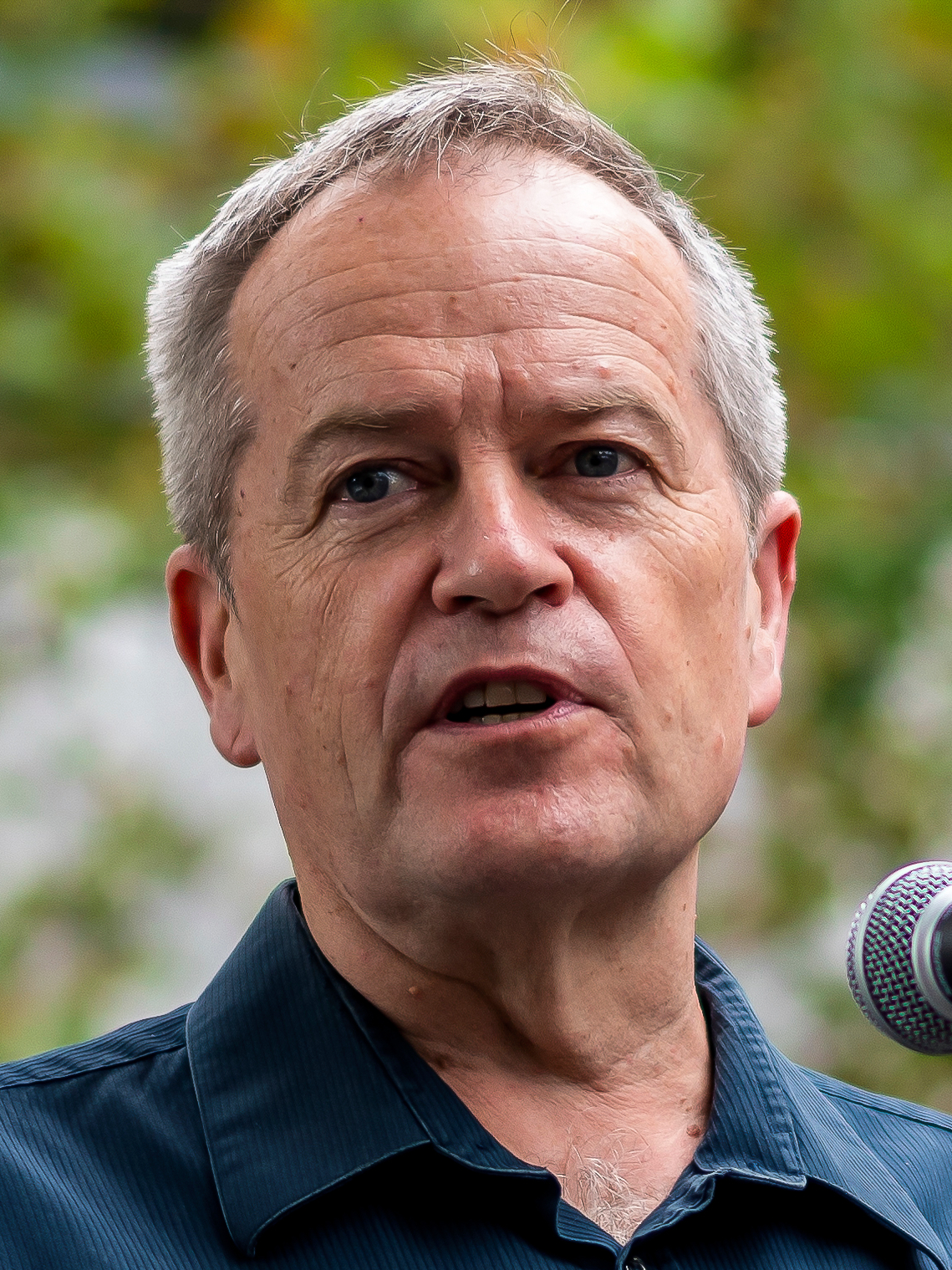
- Shorten in 2021

Vice-Chancellor of the University of Canberra
- Incumbent
- Assumed office 14 February 2025
- Chancellor: Lisa Paul
- Preceded by: Stephen Parker

Leader of the Opposition
- In office 13 October 2013 – 30 May 2019
- Prime Minister: Tony Abbott; Malcolm Turnbull; Scott Morrison
- Deputy: Tanya Plibersek
- Preceded by: Chris Bowen
- Succeeded by: Anthony Albanese

20th Leader of the Labor Party
- In office 13 October 2013 – 30 May 2019
- Deputy: Tanya Plibersek
- Preceded by: Kevin Rudd (Note: Chris Bowen acted from 13 September 2013 to 13 October 2013.)
- Succeeded by: Anthony Albanese
Ministerial roles
Minister for the National Disability Insurance Scheme
In office 1 June 2022 – 20 January 2025
Prime Minister	Anthony Albanese
Preceded by	Linda Reynolds
Succeeded by	Amanda Rishworth
Minister for Government Services
In office 1 June 2022 – 20 January 2025
Prime Minister	Anthony Albanese
Preceded by	Linda Reynolds
Succeeded by	Katy Gallagher
Minister for Workplace Relations
In office 14 December 2011 – 18 September 2013
Prime Minister	Julia Gillard; Kevin Rudd
Preceded by	Chris Evans
Succeeded by	Eric Abetz (as Minister for Employment)
Minister for Education
In office 1 July 2013 – 18 September 2013
Prime Minister	Kevin Rudd
Preceded by	Peter Garrett
Succeeded by	Christopher Pyne
Minister for Financial Services and Superannuation
In office 14 September 2010 – 1 July 2013
Prime Minister	Julia Gillard; Kevin Rudd
Preceded by	Chris Bowen
Succeeded by	David Bradbury
Minister for Employment
In office 14 December 2011 – 1 July 2013
Prime Minister	Julia Gillard; Kevin Rudd
Preceded by	Chris Evans
Succeeded by	Brendan O'Connor
Assistant Treasurer of Australia
In office 14 September 2010 – 14 December 2011
Prime Minister	Julia Gillard
Preceded by	Nick Sherry
Succeeded by	Mark Arbib

Member of the Australian Parliament for Maribyrnong
- In office 24 November 2007 – 20 January 2025
- Preceded by: Bob Sercombe
- Succeeded by: Jo Briskey

Personal details
- Born: William Richard Shorten; 12 May 1967 (age 59) Fitzroy, Victoria, Australia
- Party: Labor
- Spouses: Debbie Beale (m. 2000; div. 2008) Chloe Bryce (m. 2009)
- Children: 1
- Relatives: Michael Bryce (father-in-law); Quentin Strachan (mother-in-law)
- Education: Monash University (BA, LLB); University of Melbourne (MBA)
- Occupation: Politician
- Profession: Trade unionist
- Website: www.billshorten.com.au

Military service
- Allegiance: Australia
- Branch/service: Australian Army Reserve
- Years of service: 1985–1986
- Bill Shorten's voice Shorten addressing the Lowy Institute; 30 October 2018

William Richard Shorten (born 12 May 1967) is an Australian former politician and trade unionist who served as the leader of the Opposition and the leader of the Labor Party from 2013 to 2019, and served as a cabinet minister in the Gillard, Rudd and Albanese governments.

Born in Melbourne, Shorten studied law at Monash University. He worked in politics and in law before becoming an organiser with the Australian Workers' Union (AWU) in 1994. He was elected state secretary of the Victorian Branch of the AWU in 1998 before becoming AWU national secretary in 2001. In this role, Shorten played a prominent role as a negotiator following the Beaconsfield Mine collapse in 2006, which first brought him to national prominence.

Shorten was elected to the House of Representatives at the 2007 federal election, winning the seat of Maribyrnong, before being immediately appointed a Parliamentary Secretary. Following the 2010 election, he was promoted to the cabinet, serving first as Assistant Treasurer, then as Minister for Financial Services and Superannuation and Minister for Workplace Relations in Julia Gillard's government. After Kevin Rudd replaced Gillard as prime minister in June 2013, Shorten was briefly Minister for Education until the Labor Party's defeat at the 2013 election. During his time as a minister, Shorten was instrumental in the creation of the National Disability Insurance Scheme (NDIS).

After Rudd retired from politics, Shorten won a leadership election in October 2013 against Anthony Albanese, and became leader of the Labor Party. He led Labor to a narrow loss at the 2016 election and then led Labor to an unexpected defeat at the 2019 election, after which he announced his resignation as leader, with Albanese being elected unopposed to replace him. Following Labor's victory at the 2022 election, Shorten was appointed as the Minister for Government Services and for the NDIS. Shorten is a senior figure within the Labor Right. He is considered a moderate member of the Labor Party.

Shorten retired from politics in January 2025 in order to take up an appointment as vice-chancellor of the University of Canberra from February 2025.

== Early life ==
=== Birth and family background ===
Shorten was born on 12 May 1967 at St Vincent's Hospital, Melbourne, the son of Ann Rosemary (née McGrath) and William Robert Shorten. He has a twin brother, Robert. According to a statement given during the 2017–18 dual citizenship scandal, Shorten held British citizenship by descent until 2006, when he renounced it in order to run for parliament.

Shorten's mother was a university academic and lawyer who completed a doctorate at Monash University and ended her career there as a senior lecturer in education. She completed a law degree later in life and practised as a barrister for six years. She was originally from Ballarat, descended from "a long line of Irish Australians" who arrived during the Victorian gold rush. Shorten's father was a marine engineer born in Tyneside, England. After settling in Australia he worked as a manager at the Duke and Orr Dry Docks on Melbourne's Yarra River, where he was frequently in contact with union leaders. Shorten's parents divorced in 1988 and his father remarried a few years later. He subsequently became estranged from his father, who died in 2000.

=== Childhood ===
Shorten grew up in Melbourne's south-east, living in Hughesdale. (Note: Sources agree that Shorten's childhood home was located on Neerim Road, but differ as to whether it was in Murrumbeena or Hughesdale. Shorten's own book clarified this as Hughesdale.) He attended St Mary's Catholic Primary School in Malvern East. He and his brother were offered scholarships to De La Salle College, but their mother instead chose to send them to Xavier College, Kew. They began attending Kostka Hall, the college's junior campus, in 1977. Shorten was chosen for the state debating team in 1984, his final year at the school. He excelled at fencing and was the state under-15 champion in the sabre division.

=== University ===
In 1985, Shorten began studying at Monash University and also joined the Australian Army Reserve as a private, a position he held until 1987. During his first years at university, he briefly worked in a butcher shop. Also active in student politics, both in the university's ALP Club and in Young Labor, he helped establish Network, a Labor Right-aligned faction of Young Labor; in 1986 it "took control of Young Labor from the Left for the first time". He volunteered in Senator Gareth Evans' office around this time as well. After the 1988 Victorian state election, Shorten was employed as a youth affairs adviser to Neil Pope, a Victorian government minister. He took a gap year in 1990, travelling overseas for the first time and backpacking through Central Europe. He was subsequently involved in Network's abortive attempt to take over the state branch of the Australian Theatrical and Amusement Employees' Association.

=== Labour movement ===
After graduating, Shorten worked for twenty months as a lawyer for Maurice Blackburn Cashman. In 1994, he began his union career as a trainee organiser under the ACTU's Organising Works program at the Australian Workers' Union (AWU), before being elected Victorian state secretary in 1998. His time as secretary was marked by a reform of the union's structures.

Shorten was elected as the AWU's national secretary in 2001 and was re-elected in 2005. He resigned as Victorian state secretary of the AWU in August 2007. He was an active member of the Labor Party and was a member of the party's national executive until 2011, as well as the administrative committee of the Victorian branch. He was also director of the Superannuation Trust of Australia (now Australian Super) and the Victorian Funds Management Corporation. From December 2005 until May 2008 he was the Victorian state president of the Labor Party. He was also a member of the Australian Council of Trade Unions executive. Until early 2006, he was a board member of GetUp.org.au.

During his time as AWU national secretary, Shorten was the interim chief executive of the Australian Netball Players Association (ANPA), following an alliance between the AWU and ANPA in 2005. Shorten also served on the advisory board of the Australian Cricketers' Association.

== Political career ==
=== Entry into politics ===
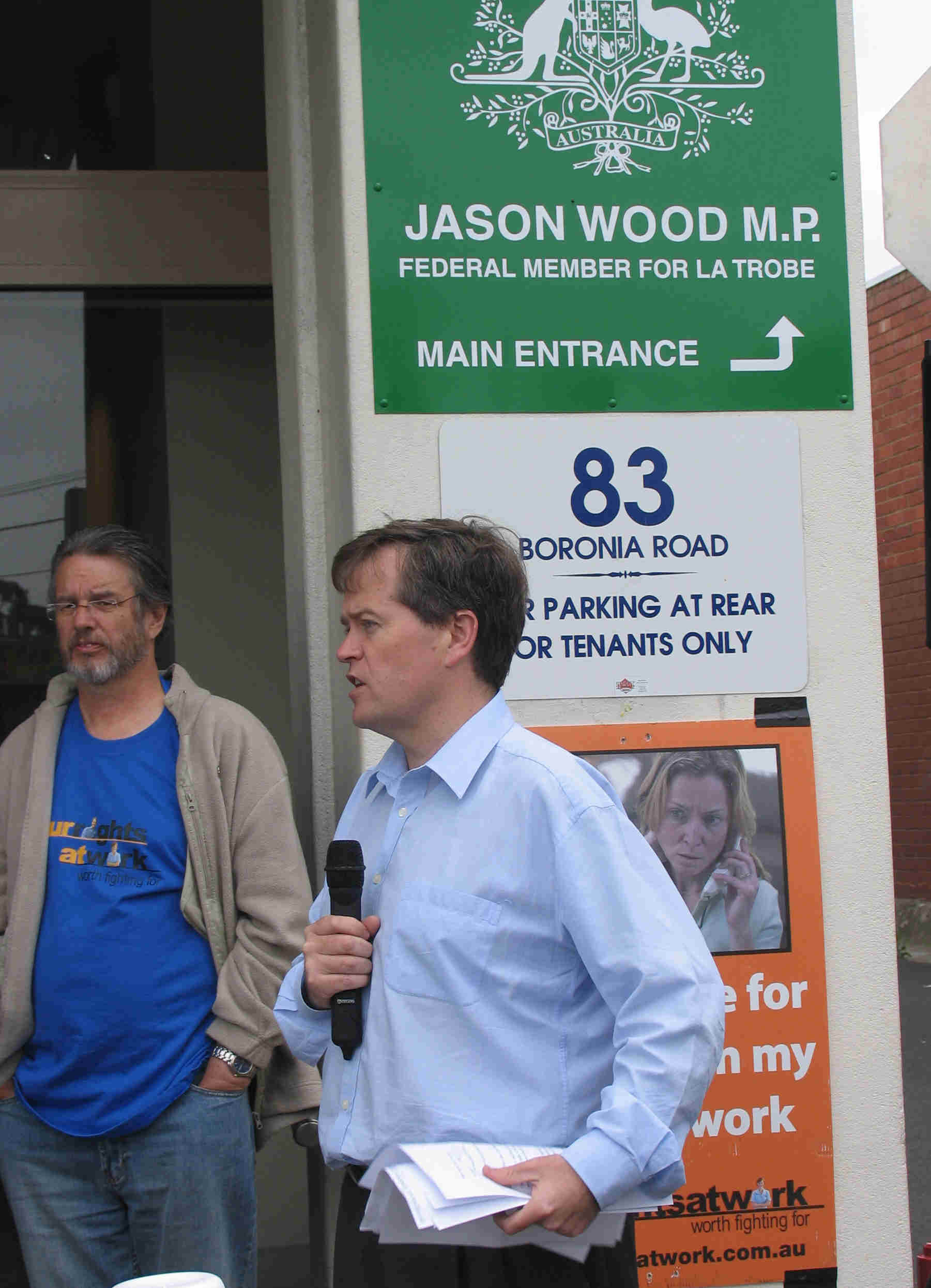
Shorten speaking at an anti-WorkChoices rally in 2006

Prior to the 1996 federal election, aged 28, Shorten contested Labor preselection for the Division of Maribyrnong. He was defeated by Bob Sercombe, who went on to retain the seat for Labor at the election. In February 1998, Shorten won preselection for the safe Labor seat of Melton at the 1999 state election. He was not a resident of the electorate, located on the rural–urban fringe to Melbourne's north-west. He subsequently resigned as a candidate in order to become state secretary of the AWU.

In 2005, Shorten announced that he would again seek preselection for the Division of Maribyrnong, challenging Sercombe (who was now a member of the Beazley shadow ministry). Justifying his challenge to an incumbent Labor MP, Shorten said, "...we haven't won a federal election since 1993. When your footy team loses four consecutive grand finals, you renew the team."

On 28 February 2006, Sercombe announced that he was withdrawing his candidacy for re-selection, a few days before the vote of local members in which Shorten was expected to poll very strongly. As a result, Shorten was selected unopposed to contest the seat. Later in 2006, during the Beaconsfield Mine collapse, Shorten, as National Secretary of the AWU, played a role as a negotiator and commentator on developments in the immediate aftermath and the ensuing rescue operations. The mine rescue operations drew mass national media coverage, and raised Shorten's political profile ahead of the 2007 election.

=== First Rudd government ===
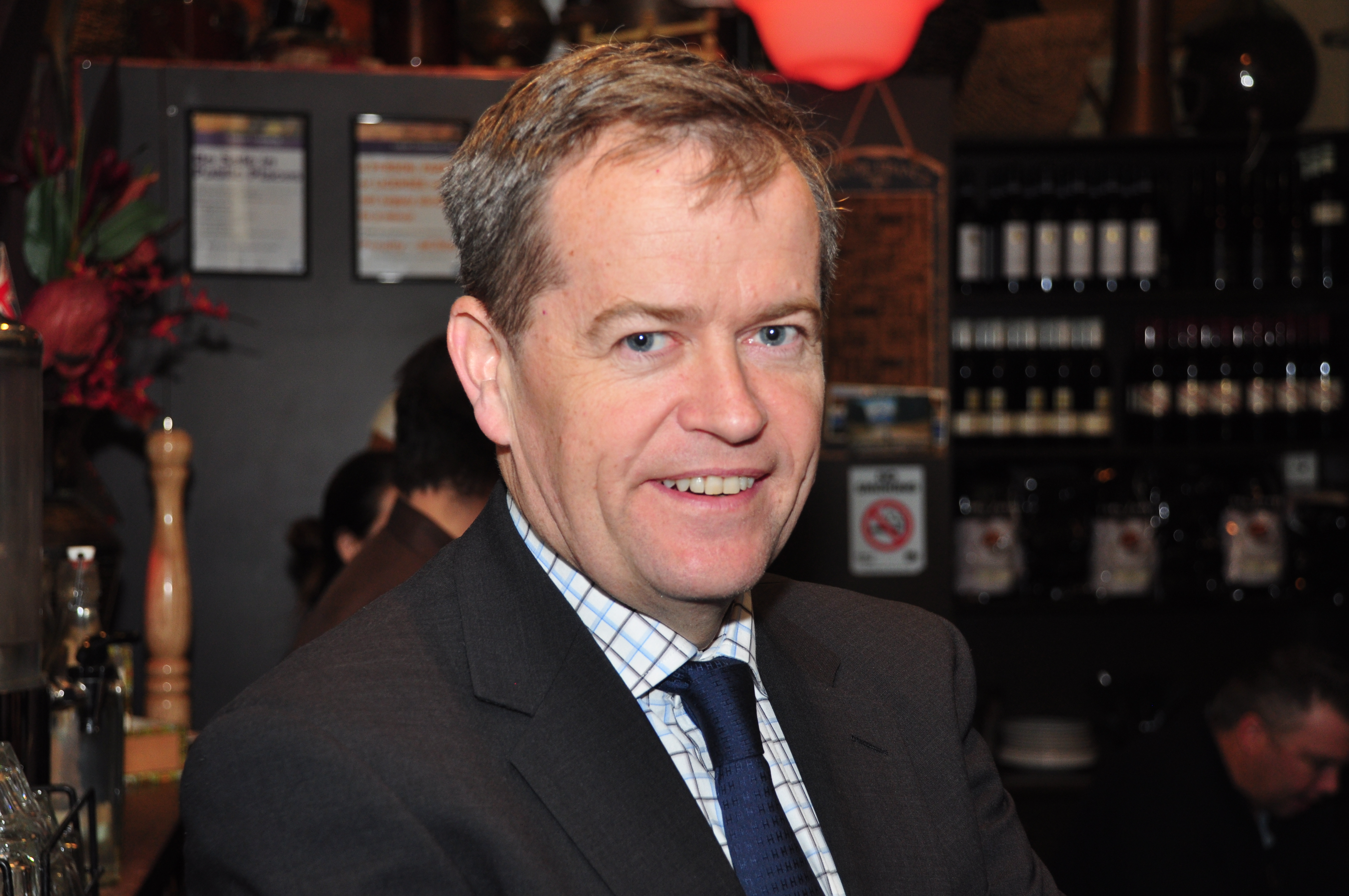
Shorten in August 2010.

At the 2007 federal election, Shorten was elected to the House of Representatives as the Labor MP for Maribyrnong. It was speculated that with his high public profile and general popularity within the Labor Party, he might immediately be given a front-bench portfolio; however, when asked about the possibility, new Prime Minister Kevin Rudd said that he believed parliamentary experience was essential when designating front-bench portfolios. Instead, Rudd announced that Shorten would become Parliamentary Secretary for Disabilities and Children's Services. As Parliamentary Secretary, Shorten pushed hard for the National Disability Insurance Scheme, something which was later to become a key policy of the Labor government.

=== Leadership spills ===
Shorten would later become one of the main factional leaders involved in the replacement of Kevin Rudd as Prime Minister and Leader of the Labor Party with Julia Gillard in the 2010 leadership challenge.

Following the 2010 federal election, there was speculation that Shorten might seek to oust Prime Minister Julia Gillard from her position within the year; former Labor Prime Minister Bob Hawke and former Labor Opposition Leader Kim Beazley had both previously endorsed Shorten as a potential future Labor Leader. Shorten denied this speculation, and was promoted to the Cabinet as Minister for Financial Services and Superannuation. In 2011, he was also given the position of Minister for Workplace Relations.

Following a period of persistent leadership tensions, Shorten announced immediately before a June 2013 leadership ballot took place that he would back Rudd against Gillard, and would resign from the Cabinet should she win. Rudd subsequently won the ballot and became Prime Minister for a second time, appointing Shorten as Minister for Education, with particular responsibility for implementing the Gonski school funding reforms.

==== Election as leader ====
Following the defeat of the Labor government at the 2013 federal election, Kevin Rudd announced that he would stand down as Leader of the Labor Party. Shorten subsequently announced his candidacy to be his successor, in a contest with Anthony Albanese that would be the first time party members would be eligible to vote. Shorten subsequently gained 63.9% of the party caucus vote and 40.8% of the rank-and-file members' vote, which when weighted equally gave Shorten a 52.02% victory over Albanese.

=== Leader of the Opposition ===
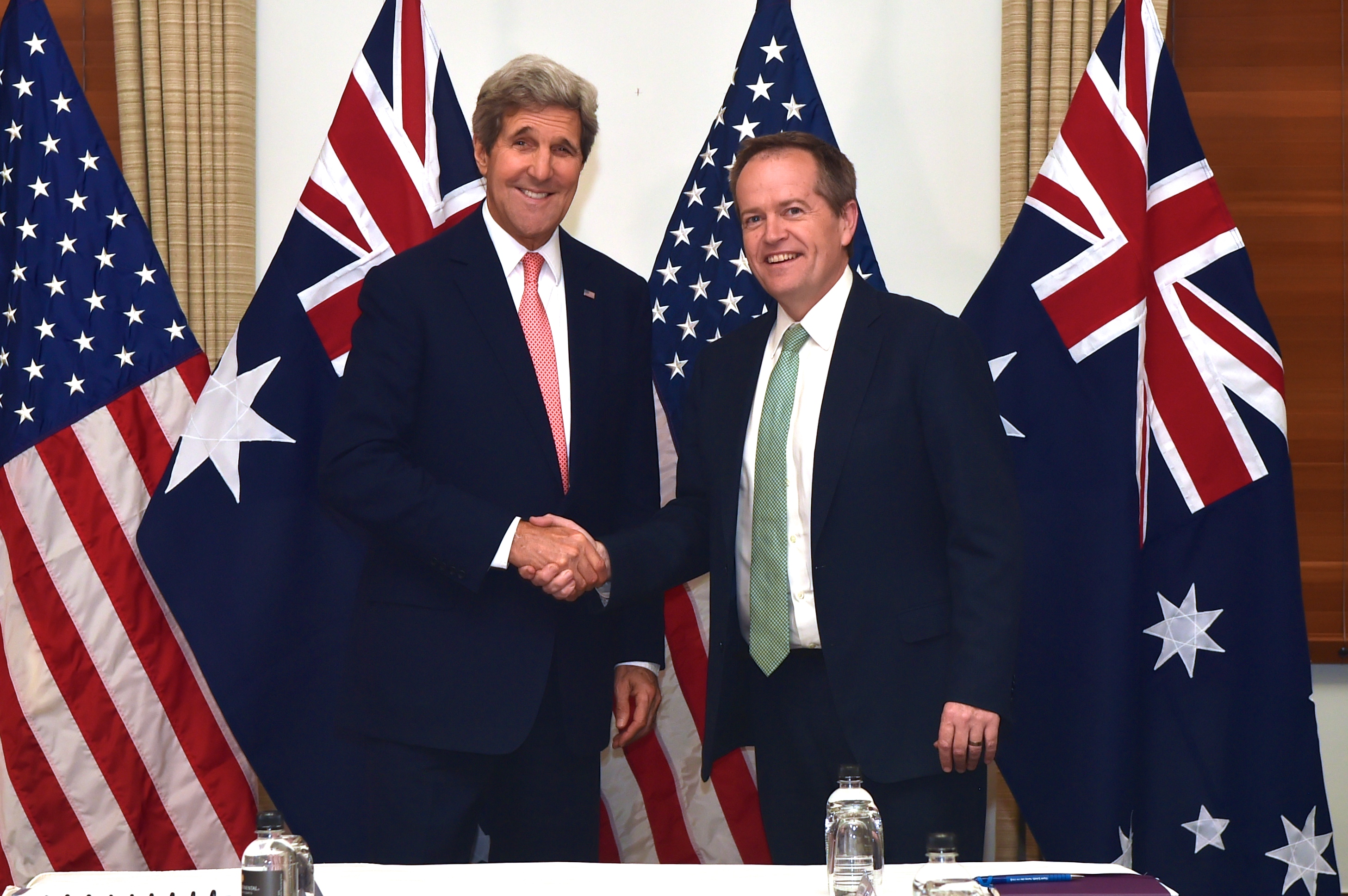
Shorten (right) meeting with United States Secretary of State John Kerry, in 2014

==== First term as leader ====
His first speech acknowledged the role of women in his election success. He distanced himself from Tony Abbott's social conservatism, saying "I reject the assumption that merit is more located in the brains of men than women" and highlighting the proportion of women in Labor's leadership, with Tanya Plibersek as Deputy Leader and Penny Wong as Senate Opposition Leader.

Shorten had been consistently polling better than Abbott and Labor better than the Abbott Coalition government from the July 2014 Australian federal budget until the September 2015 Liberal leadership ballot when Malcolm Turnbull succeeded Abbott as Prime Minister. Turnbull's honeymoon polling soared above Shorten with the Turnbull Coalition government taking the lead over Labor. Brendan Nelson holds the record for lowest Newspoll "Better Prime Minister" rating of 7% (29 February-2 March 2008). Three leaders including Shorten hold the combined second-lowest rating of 14% – Simon Crean (28–30 November 2003), Malcolm Turnbull (27–29 November 2009) and Shorten (4–6 December 2015). The December 2015 Newspoll saw a continued 53-47 two-party vote to the government, however Turnbull's personal ratings were significantly lessened, with personal approval down eight to 52% and personal disapproval up eight to 30%. Some media outlets opined Turnbull's honeymoon to be over.

In early 2015, leading up to Australia Day, Shorten called for a new push for Australia to become a republic. Former ARM chair Malcolm Turnbull said upon his appointment as Prime Minister in September of the same year he would not pursue "his dream" of Australia becoming a republic until after the end of the Queen's reign, instead focusing his efforts toward the economy. In July 2017, Shorten revealed that should the Labor Party be elected to government at the 2019 federal election, they would legislate for a compulsory plebiscite on the issue. Should that plebiscite be supported by a majority of Australians, a referendum would be held, asking the public for their support for a specific model of government.

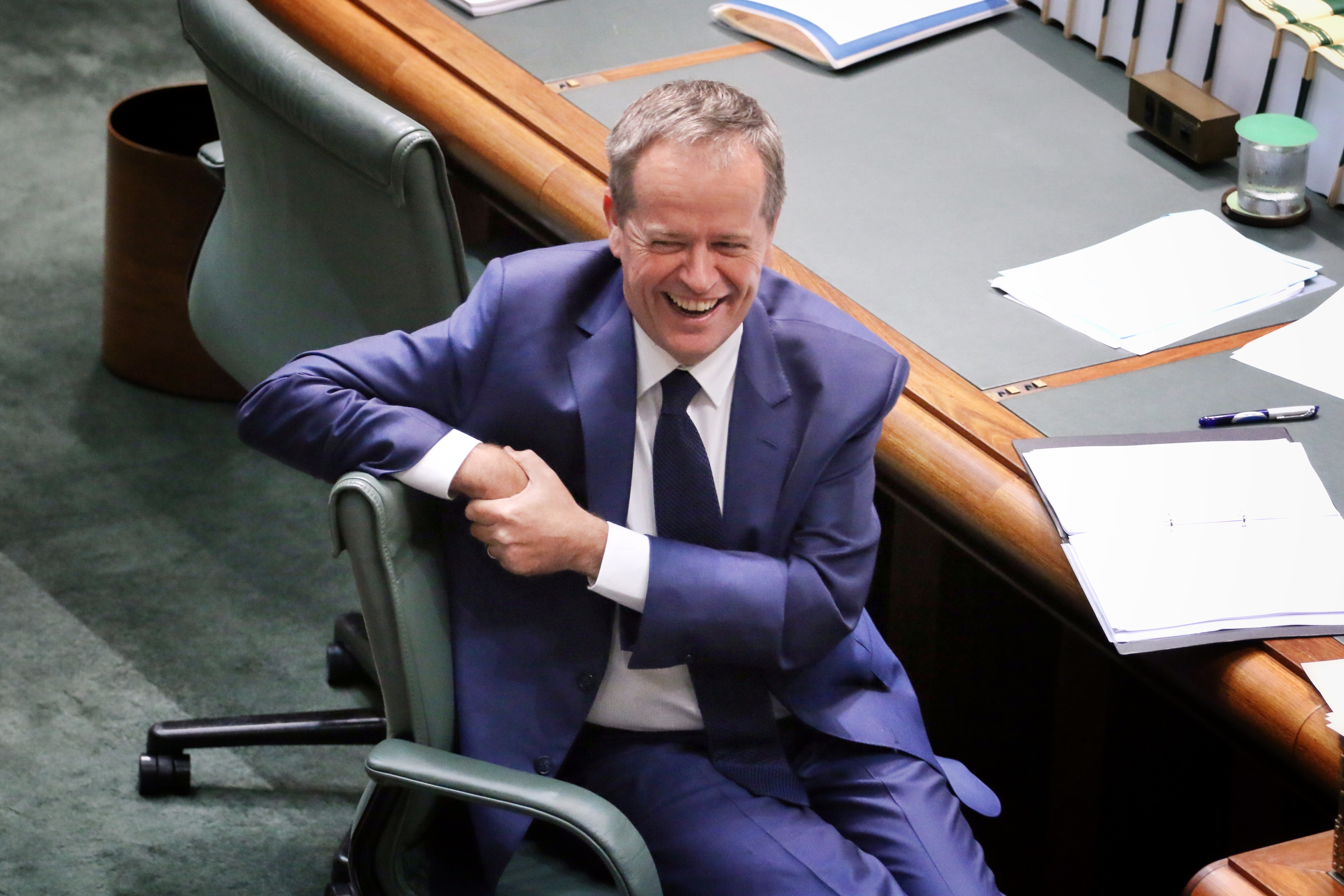
Shorten in Parliament in 2016

In 2015, Shorten said that the voting age should be lowered to 16. In February 2016, Shorten called Cory Bernardi a "homophobe". In March 2016, Shorten committed that the party would oppose any effort to extend discrimination law exemptions to allow people who object to same-sex marriage to deny goods and services to same-sex couples.

==== 2016 federal election ====
In 2016, Shorten led Labor to gain 14 seats at the federal election when Malcolm Turnbull and the Liberal-National Coalition retained majority government by a single seat. The result was the closest since the 1961 federal election.

==== 2019 federal election ====
Shorten led Labor into the Australian federal election in 2019. Labor had led most polls for the better part of two years, and every major opinion poll projected a Labor victory.

However, a number of factors, including third-party preferences in Queensland, allowed the Coalition–then led by Scott Morrison–to a surprise election victory, and regain its parliamentary majority. Shorten conceded defeat on election night and subsequently announced he would step down as the leader of the Labor Party. In a post-election review commissioned by the Labor Party in November 2019, the loss was partially attributed to Shorten's personal unpopularity. A separate study by the Australian National University found Shorten to be the least popular Labor leader since modern polling began, with his popularity representing "a historic low for any major party leader in recent times".

=== Post-leadership ===
Shorten announced his resignation as Leader of the Labor Party on 18 May 2019, following Labor's defeat in the 2019 election. Anthony Albanese succeeded him as leader on 30 May, with Richard Marles as his deputy.

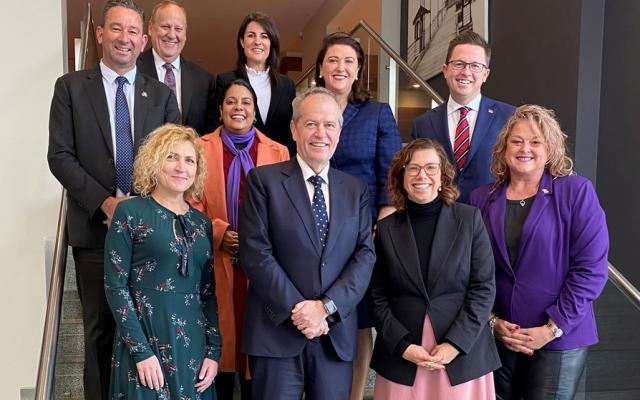
Shorten (front row, centre) attending a Commonwealth meeting in June 2022

After Albanese assumed the leadership, Shorten was appointed as part of the shadow cabinet, as shadow minister for the National Disability Insurance Scheme (NDIS) and for Government Services.

==== Albanese government ====
Following Labor's victory at the 2022 federal election, Shorten was sworn in as the Minister for the NDIS and Government Services on 1 June. In November 2022, Shorten vowed to crack down on NDIS "rorts", with the scheme having become rife with fraud. In August 2024, Shorten introduced legislation designed to cap the growth of the NDIS and bring in sweeping powers to investigate fraud, which Parliament passed with bipartisan support. Shorten led the Albanese government's response to the Royal Commission into the Robodebt Scheme, including by moving a motion of apology to the victims of the illegal scheme in August 2023. He also repeatedly lobbied for the names of the people who had been referred to other agencies for criminal or civil penalties to be made public, having been kept anonymous in the commission's final report.

On 5 September 2024, Shorten announced his retirement from politics prior to the 2025 federal election. On that date, Shorten also announced his appointment as Vice-Chancellor of the University of Canberra, commencing in February 2025. Shorten resigned from Parliament on 20 January 2025.

== Post-political career ==
Shorten was conferred as the University of Canberra's vice chancellor on 14 February 2025. Bill Shorten was conferred the academic award of Professor of Practice at the University of Canberra on 1 December 2025.

== Personal life ==
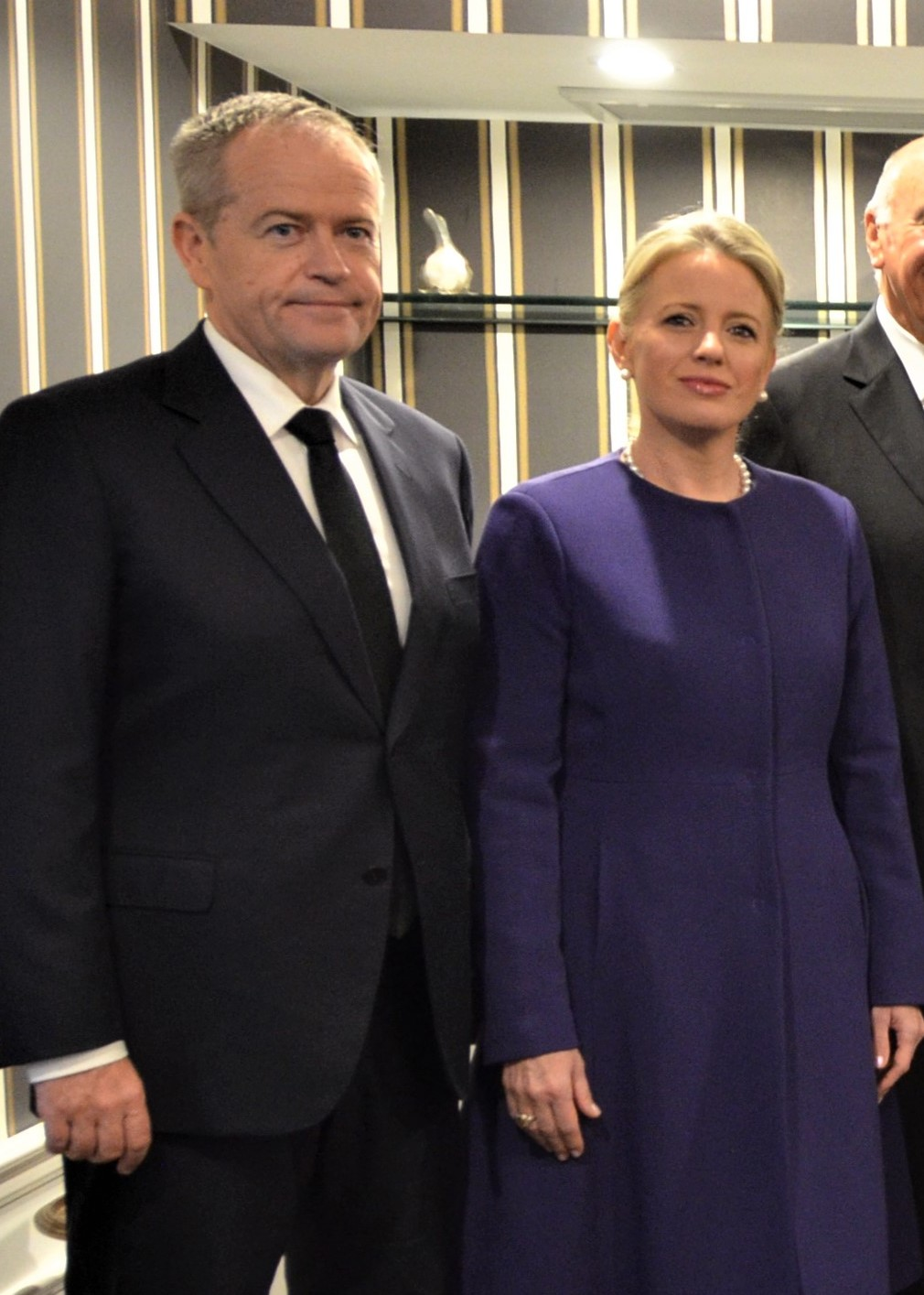
Bill and Chloe Shorten in March 2019

In March 2000, Shorten married Debbie Beale, daughter of businessman and former Liberal MP Julian Beale. They divorced in 2008. In 2009, Shorten married Chloe Bryce, daughter of then Governor-General Quentin Bryce. The Shortens live in Moonee Ponds, Victoria with their daughter, as well as Chloe Shorten's other two children from her previous marriage to Brisbane architect Roger Parkin, who shares their parental responsibility.

Shorten was raised Catholic, but converted to Anglicanism before his second marriage – as well as it being his wife's religion, he "had come to disagree with the [Catholic] Church on a number of issues".

In 2014, Shorten publicly identified himself as the senior ALP figure at the centre of a 2013 allegation of rape, said to have occurred in 1986. Shorten strongly denied the allegations in a statement, which was made after Victoria Police were advised from the Office of Public Prosecutions that there was no reasonable prospect of conviction.

== See also ==
- Shadow Ministry of Bill Shorten

== Notes ==
Trade union offices
Preceded by Terry Muscat	National Secretary of the Australian Workers' Union; 2001–2007	Succeeded by Paul Howes
Parliament of Australia
Preceded by Bob Sercombe	Member for Maribyrnong; 2007–2025	Succeeded by Jo Briskey
Political offices
New office	Parliamentary Secretary for Disabilities and Children's Services; 2007–2010	Succeeded by Jan McLucas as Parliamentary Secretary for Disabilities and Carers
New office	Parliamentary Secretary for Victorian Bushfire Reconstruction; 2009–2010	Office abolished
Preceded by Nick Sherry	Assistant Treasurer of Australia; 2010–2011	Succeeded by Mark Arbib
Preceded by Chris Bowen as Minister for Financial Services, Superannuation and Corporate Law	Minister for Financial Services and Superannuation; 2010–2013	Succeeded by David Bradbury as Minister Assisting for Financial Services and Superannuation
Preceded by Chris Evans as Minister for Tertiary Education, Skills, Jobs and Workplace Relations	Minister for Employment and Workplace Relations; 2011–2013	Succeeded by Brendan O'Connor as Minister for Employment
Preceded by Chris Evans as Minister for Tertiary Education, Skills, Jobs and Workplace Relations	Minister for Employment and Workplace Relations; 2011–2013	Succeeded by Himself as Minister for Workplace Relations
Preceded by Himself as Minister for Employment and Workplace Relations	Minister for Workplace Relations; 2013	Succeeded by Kelly O'Dwyer as Minister for Jobs and Industrial Relations
Preceded by Peter Garrett as Minister for School Education, Early Childhood and Youth	Minister for Education; 2013	Succeeded by Christopher Pyne
Preceded by Chris Bowen as Acting Leader of the Opposition of Australia	Leader of the Opposition of Australia; 2013–2019	Succeeded by Anthony Albanese
Preceded by Shane Neumann as Shadow Minister for Indigenous Affairs	Shadow Minister for Indigenous Affairs and Aboriginal and Torres Strait Islanders; 2016–2019	Succeeded by Linda Burney as Shadow Minister for Indigenous Australians
Preceded by Carol Brown as Shadow Minister for Disability and Carers	Shadow Minister for the National Disability Insurance Scheme; 2019–2022	Succeeded by Michael Sukkar
Preceded by Ed Husic as Shadow Minister for Human Services	Shadow Minister for Government Services; 2019–2022	Succeeded by Paul Fletcher as Shadow Minister for Government Services and the Digital Economy
Preceded by Linda Reynolds	Minister for the National Disability Insurance Scheme; 2022–2025	Succeeded by Amanda Rishworth
Preceded by Linda Reynolds	Minister for Government Services; 2022–2025	Succeeded by Katy Gallagher
Party political offices
Preceded by Chris Bowen as Acting Leader of the Australian Labor Party	Leader of the Australian Labor Party; 2013–2019	Succeeded by Anthony Albanese
Academic offices
Preceded by Stephen Parker as Interim Vice-Chancellor of the University of Canberra	Vice-Chancellor of the University of Canberra; 2025–present	Incumbent
