= Tom Calma =

Aboriginal Australian academic and human rights advocate (born 1953)

Tom Calma AO FAA FASSA FAHA
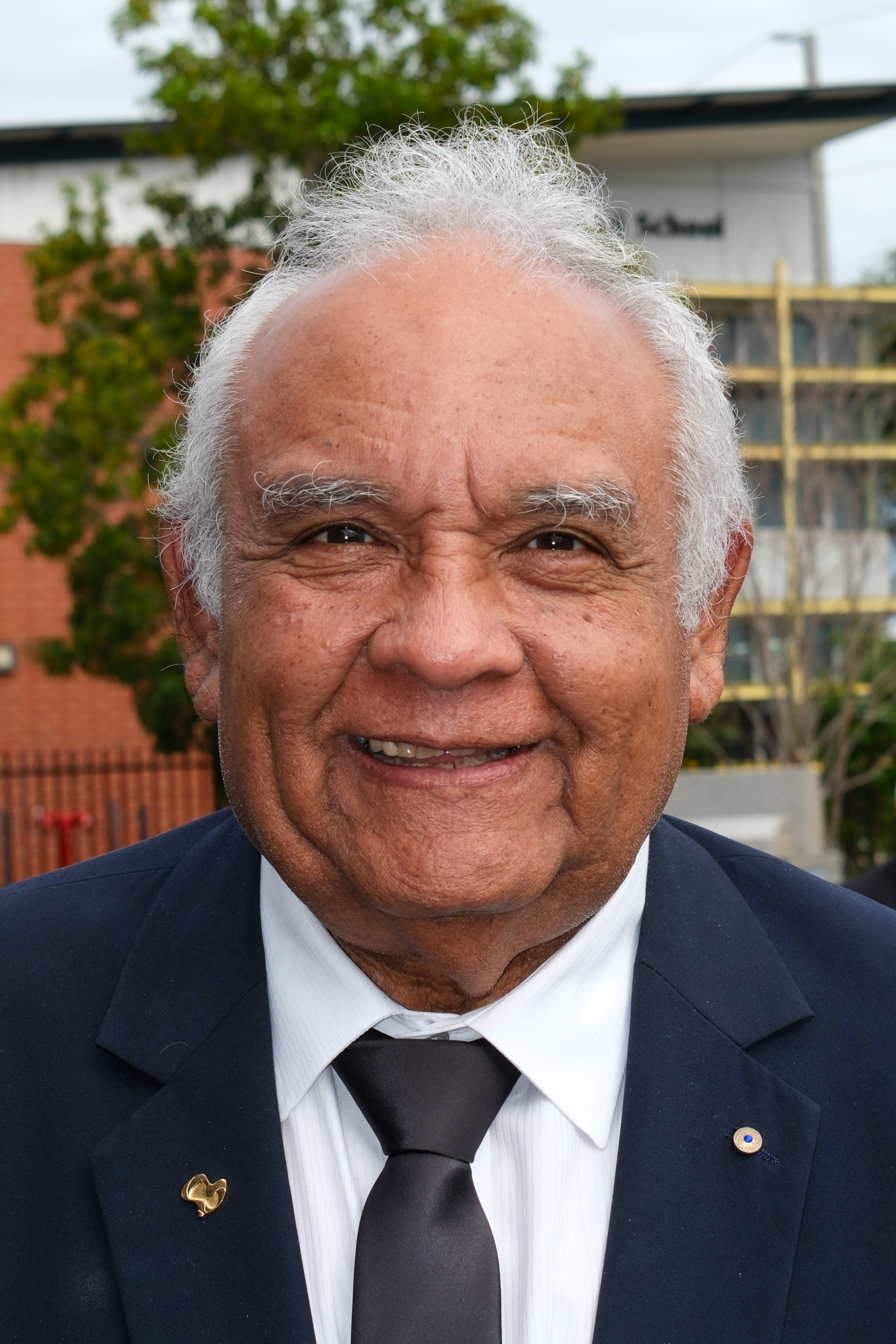
- Calma in 2026

6th Chancellor of the University of Canberra
- In office 1 January 2014 – 31 December 2023
- Preceded by: John Mackay
- Succeeded by: Lisa Paul

Aboriginal and Torres Strait Islander Social Justice Commissioner
- In office 2004–2009
- Preceded by: William Jonas
- Succeeded by: Mick Gooda

Race Discrimination Commissioner
- In office 2004–2009
- Preceded by: William Jonas
- Succeeded by: Graeme Innes

Personal details
- Born: Thomas Edwin Calma; 1953 (age 72–73) Adelaide River, Northern Territory, Australia
- Spouse: Heather Calma
- Children: 3
- Education: South Australian Institute of Technology
- Profession: Social worker; public servant

Thomas Edwin Calma (born 1953) is an Aboriginal Australian academic and human rights advocate who served as the Aboriginal and Torres Strait Islander Social Justice Commissioner and Race Discrimination Commissioner from 2004 to 2009. He was the sixth chancellor of the University of Canberra from 2014 to 2023 and became the second Aboriginal or Torres Strait Islander person to serve as chancellor of an Australian university. Calma was designated as 2013 Australian Capital Territory Australian of the Year and 2023 Senior Australian of the Year.

Born in 1953 in Adelaide River in the Northern Territory, Calma had parents with ancestry from the Iwaidja and Kungarakany peoples. They also had Filipino and Dutch ancestors. He grew up in Darwin, where he was exposed to the strength of family and culture, difficult experiences of poverty, and an understanding of the consequences of dispossession and the Stolen Generation. Having completed his high school education in 1971, Calma relocated to Adelaide and attended the South Australian Institute of Technology, specialising in the areas of community development and social work.

Calma began his career in the Indigenous education and advocacy sphere, having worked on setting up the Aboriginal Task Force at the Darwin Community College in 1980. Later he was appointed as one of the first Indigenous academics who gained tenure in Australia. He also had a career in the Australian Public Service and worked as a diplomat for Australia in India and Vietnam. He was appointed Aboriginal and Torres Strait Islander Social Justice Commissioner and Race Discrimination Commissioner at the Australian Human Rights Commission in 2004. While working at the commission, he became a member of the development team of the Close the Gap campaign, called for action on family violence among Indigenous population, reacted to the apology made by the Australian government to the Stolen Generations in 2008, and helped to create new Indigenous representation structures.

Calma became the national coordinator of the Tackling Indigenous Smoking campaign, co-chair of Reconciliation Australia, chair of Ninti One and an adjunct academic at the Australian National University. He was the first Aboriginal or Torres Strait Islander person to be selected as the Chancellor of the University of Canberra, serving from 2014 until 2023. During this time, he chaired the process of the Indigenous Voice federal advisory body with Marcia Langton, and participated in national debates on constitutional recognition and Voice to Parliament.

== Early life and education ==
Calma was born in 1953 at Adelaide River, near Darwin, to Tom Calma Senior and Ada Calma. Through his parents, he is connected to both regions of the Northern Territory, with his father belonging to the Iwaidja people of the Cobourg Peninsula and his mother being of Kungarakany descent from the Adelaide River region. His family heritage also includes Filipino ancestry through his paternal grandfather and Dutch ancestry through his maternal grandfather, both of whom married Aboriginal women. Calma's father began his career as a truck driver before later becoming a senior public service official within the federal government. His family experienced the effects of dispossession and policies associated with the Stolen Generations, contributing to a strong awareness during his childhood of the impacts of forced removal on Aboriginal families. Raised alongside his three sisters, Calma moved with his family to Darwin when he was three years old.

Growing up in Darwin, Calma spent much of his childhood fishing, hunting, and gathering food with his family, experiences shaped in part by the financial difficulties faced by his parents, who often struggled to make ends meet. He later described his upbringing as being strongly influenced by family relationships, Aboriginal culture, and a close connection to Country shaped his identity and values. Calma later discovered after his father's death that his parents had concealed many of their financial hardships from their children despite periods of significant economic strain. He also identified several turning points in his early life, including the realisation that few Indigenous students from his community completed secondary school or entered university, as well as the impact of Cyclone Tracy, which devastated Darwin in 1974.

Calma was compelled to enrol in college after graduating from high school in 1971. Encouraged by discussions at a community meeting in Darwin, Calma decided to pursue higher education and relocated to Adelaide, where he studied community development and social work at the South Australian Institute of Technology. He later noted that the program created an educational atmosphere conducive to Indigenous learners while expanding his national vision.

== Career ==
=== Early career (1980–2003) ===
The limited availability of secondary education opportunities in the Northern Territory prompted Calma to begin advocating for Indigenous education and social advancement. Following lobbying efforts by Calma and his colleagues, the Aboriginal Task Force was established at the Darwin Community College in 1980 to expand educational opportunities for Aboriginal students. That same year, Calma joined the college as a lecturer in the program before being appointed coordinator in 1981 and later worked as the head of the department which conducted the program. During this period, he became the first Indigenous Australian to gain tenure from a post-secondary institution in the Northern Territory as well as one of the first Indigenous academics in Australia to do so. Under his leadership, the Aboriginal Task Force expanded rapidly from a single class of 25 students to five full-time classes enrolling more than 300 Aboriginal and Torres Strait Islander students by 1986.

In 1986, Calma returned to the Australian public service as director of the Aboriginal Employment and Training Branch within the Department of Education, Employment, Training and Youth Affairs in Darwin. After relocating to Canberra, he served as Executive Officer to the department secretary, where he coordinated and conducted a nationwide review of Aboriginal Education Units. Over the following years, Calma held a range of senior government positions with both national and international responsibilities. Between 1995 and 2002, he worked as an Australian diplomat in India and Vietnam, representing Australian interests in the education and training sectors. By 2003, he had become involved in reconciliation initiatives with the Prime Minister and was appointed Senior Adviser on Indigenous Affairs to Philip Ruddock, then Federal Minister for Immigration, Multicultural and Indigenous Affairs. Calma later served in a variety of policy development and program implementation roles, including as manager of the Community Development and Education Branch of Aboriginal and Torres Strait Islander Services.

=== Australian Human Rights Commission (2004–2010) ===
On 12 July 2004, Calma succeeded William Jonas as Aboriginal and Torres Strait Islander Social Justice Commissioner and National Race Discrimination Commissioner at the Australian Human Rights Commission (AHRC), positions established following the Royal Commission into Aboriginal Deaths in Custody to promote human rights and equality. He also served as national patron of the Wakakirri festival and as a White Ribbon Ambassador from 2005 to 2007. In his 2005 Social Justice Report, Calma had recommended that Australian governments needed to make a commitment for equality in terms of health status and life expectancy between indigenous people and other Australians within 25 years, which was a factor in the formulation of the Close the Gap initiative. The second report published by him in 2006 highlighted that family violence in indigenous communities was a matter of serious human rights abuse which required appropriate response from all stakeholders. In March 2007, Calma released the Voices of Australia education resource designed for secondary school students to explain Australian history of race relations, population diversity, and the functions of the AHRC. The Close the Gap initiative was publicly launched in April with support from patrons including Ian Thorpe and Cathy Freeman, while the Council of Australian Governments subsequently established measurable targets to improve Aboriginal and Torres Strait Islander health outcomes, including reducing child mortality and achieving life expectancy equality within a generation.

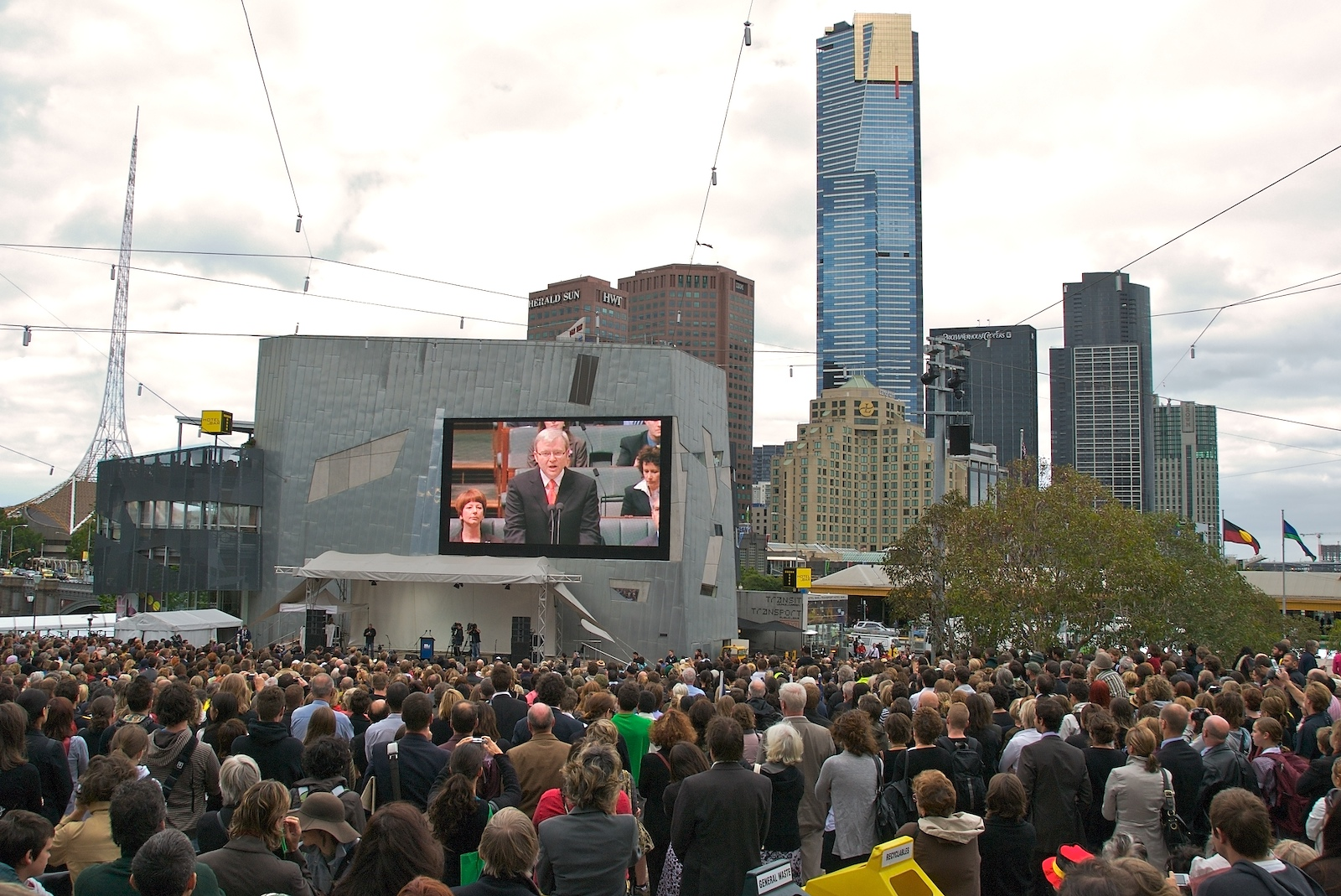
Rudd's formal apology to the Stolen Generations broadcast on screen at Federation Square, Melbourne

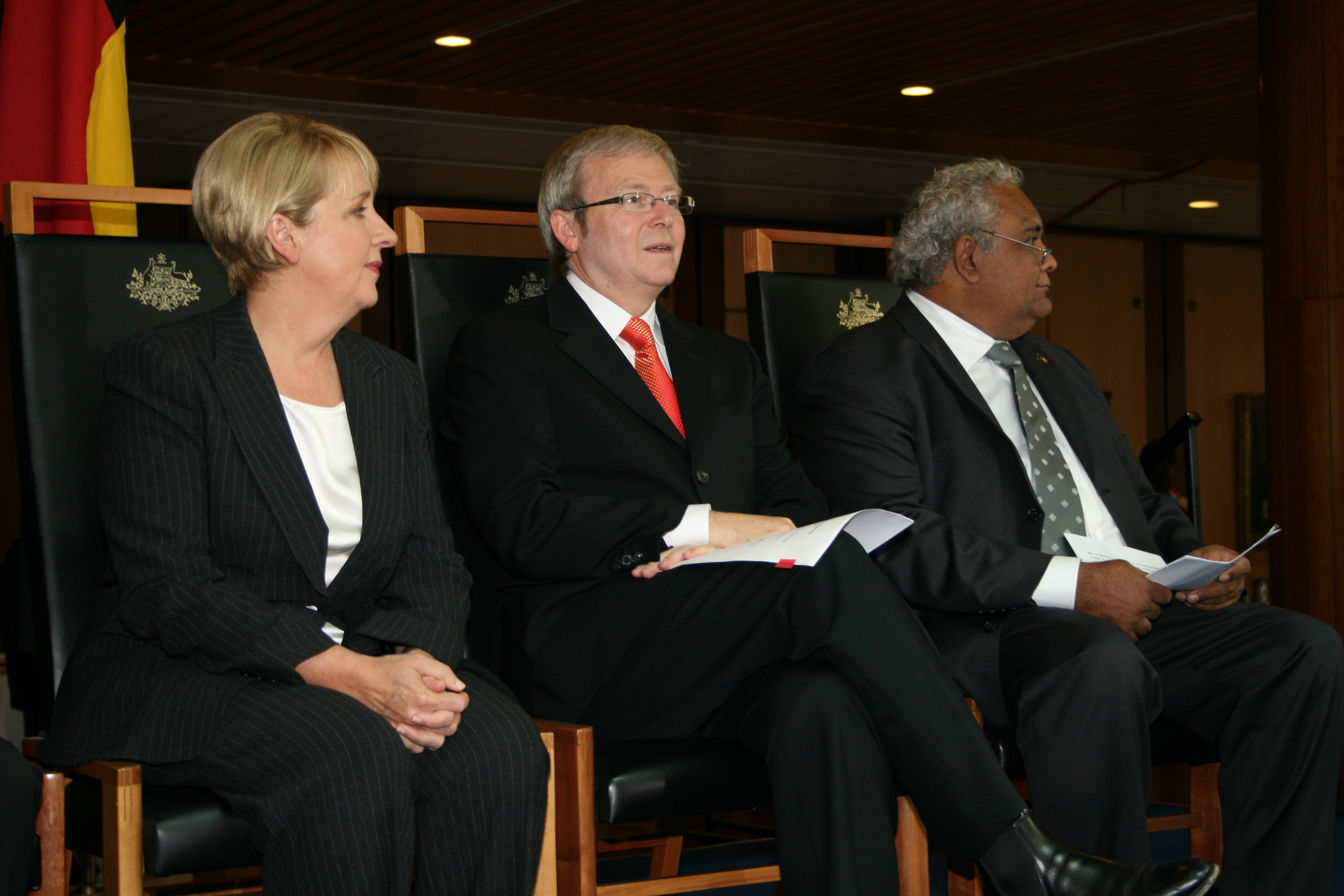
Macklin, Rudd and Calma at Parliament House following the formal apology to Indigenous Australians

On 13 February 2008, Calma delivered a formal response to the national Apology to the Stolen Generations, issued by Prime Minister Kevin Rudd in the Australian Parliament on behalf of the Australian government. In his address, Calma recounted the experience of his great-grandmother's removal, drawing on a historical government document dated 1899 to challenge claims that Aboriginal children were voluntarily released by their families, and emphasised truth-telling as a process of healing and reconciliation in addressing the colonisation of Australia. The apology itself formally acknowledged that Aboriginal and Torres Strait Islander children had been forcibly removed under successive laws and policies, resulting in profound loss, grief, and intergenerational harm.

Earlier in 2008, Calma advocated for the creation of a commission to address disparities in life expectancy, education, and economic opportunity between Indigenous and non-Indigenous Australians. On 20 March, Rudd and Opposition Leader Brendan Nelson signed the Close the Gap Statement of Intent, which committed Australian governments to achieving health equality for Indigenous Australians by 2030 through coordinated, evidence-based national strategies and improved Indigenous participation in policy development, building on recommendations made in Calma's 2005 Social Justice Report. On 21 October, he joined the University of Canberra Council. On 17 December, Calma was appointed to oversee the development of a new Indigenous advisory body to the Australian government, and later that month, he was appointed by Jenny Macklin to chair an Independent Steering Committee tasked with consulting communities and designing models for a national Indigenous representative organisation, work that ultimately informed the 2009 establishment of the National Congress of Australia's First Peoples.

Since 2009, Calma has worked with the Australian Literacy and Numeracy Foundation in early years language and literacy. In that same year, he delivered the Mabo Oration and also acted on behalf of the Stolen Generations in the parliamentary response to the national apology. The adoption of the United Nations Declaration on the Rights of Indigenous Peoples was regarded as a highly contested international document, with its legality and effectiveness debated in both Australia and New Zealand, although Calma described it as a "watershed moment" in Indigenous affairs. With his 2009 Social Justice Report, he has been a core advocate for justice reinvestment in Australia. Following his departure from the public sector later that year he described this phase of his career as a "pseudo retirement." His successor as Social Justice Commissioner was Mick Gooda, while the National Race Discrimination Commissioner role was filled by Graeme Innes.

== Later career ==
=== Reconciliation Australia (2010–2012) ===
Until leaving his position as commissioner, Calma maintained that racism in Australia existed at both social and institutional levels, and called for stronger protections against racial discrimination. He argued that aspects of government policy, including elements of welfare reform and the Northern Territory Intervention, constituted direct or indirect racial discrimination, particularly where the Racial Discrimination Act had been suspended. As part of the Closing the Gap initiative, Calma also served as national coordinator for the Tackling Indigenous Smoking program from its commencement in March 2010.

Calma delivered the Chalmers Oration in August 2010. Calma succeeded Mick Dodson, who retired in 2011, to become the co-chairman of Reconciliation Australia. Calma publicly criticised the threats made against Prime Minister Julia Gillard and Opposition Leader Tony Abbott during their visits to the Aboriginal Tent Embassy in January 2012, saying that it threatened the process of reconciliation and constitutional recognition of Aborigines. By March 2012, he had been appointed chair of Ninti One Limited, the parent organisation of the Cooperative Research Centre for Remote Economic Participation, and in May 2012 he was appointed Adjunct Associate Professor at the Australian National University National Centre for Indigenous Studies.

=== Chancellor of the University of Canberra (2014–2023) ===
On 1 January 2012, Calma was appointed Deputy Chancellor of the University of Canberra, before becoming Chancellor on 1 January 2014. His appointment made him the second Aboriginal or Torres Strait Islander person to serve as chancellor of an Australian university. During his official address after assuming office on 20 February 2014, Calma emphasised the role of education in addressing inequality and poverty, called for greater collaboration among universities in Indigenous health and reconciliation, and advocated for increased participation of Indigenous students in higher education. Calma proceeded to become a professor at the medical faculty of the University of Sydney as of 1 January 2015, taking the role as chair and patron of the Poche Indigenous Health Network. He took up the post of the first-ever chair of the Atlantic Fellows for Social Equity in October 2016, and on 10 February 2017, he was granted an extension to his chancellorship of the University of Canberra for another three years. As of 2018, he had also taken up the post of patron of the Media Centre for Education Research Australia.

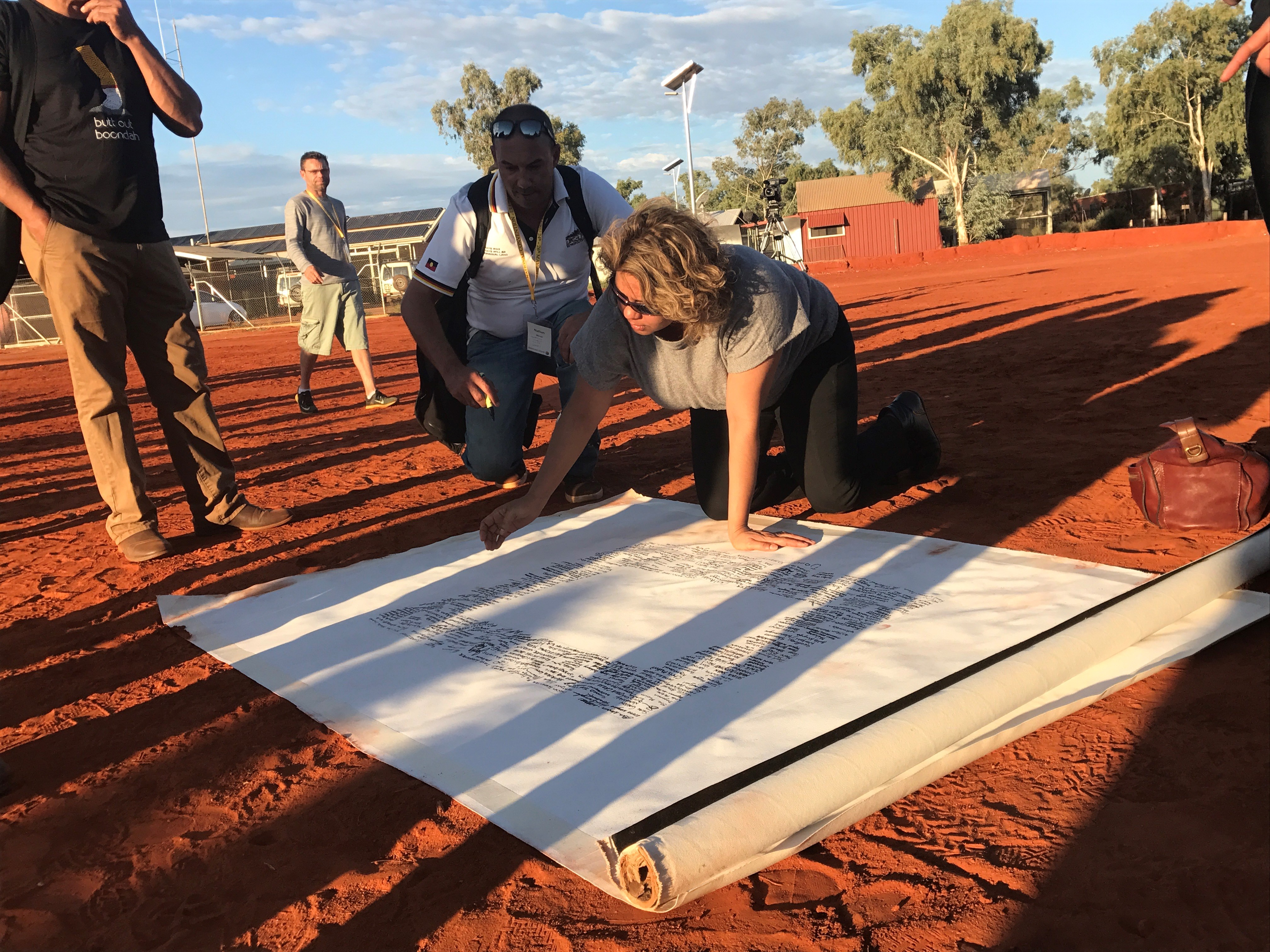
Signing of the Uluru Statement from the Heart in Central Australia, 29 May 2017

Calma and Marcia Langton were named as joint chairs of the Indigenous Voice co-design process led by the Ken Wyatt on 30 October 2019. The co-design process was intended to formulate recommendations for Indigenous representation at the local, regional, and national levels. In addition, Calma served as the co-chair of the senior advisory group for the Indigenous Voice co-design process and he resigned from his position at Reconciliation Australia in order to take up the role. Calma had previously participated in indigenous recognition proposals from both main political parties' governments, and he maintained that constitutional protection was required for the Indigenous Voice in light of the previous abolition of the Aboriginal and Torres Strait Islander Commission (ATSIC). Although the co-design process resulted in recommendations for indigenous representation, the controversy arose when the Morrison government refused to recognise the Indigenous Voice constitutionally according to the Uluru Statement from the Heart. Calma contended that although there was no obligation for the government to adopt its advice, an advisory body would bring these concerns to parliament.

During National Reconciliation Week on 2 June 2020, Calma was named patron of the Winston Churchill Trust. On 7 July 2020, he discussed the early COVID-19 response among Aboriginal and Torres Strait Islander communities in an interview with National Indigenous Television, noting low infection rates attributed to strong community-led health measures and heightened vigilance in protecting elders and remote populations, as well as highlighting tobacco and e-cigarette use as key contributors to poor Indigenous health outcomes. In subsequent roles, he was appointed to the Australian Medical Research Advisory Board in September 2021 and led the University of Canberra's Stretch Reconciliation Action Plan (2021–2024), and in 2022 delivered the Ralph Slatyer Address for Science and Society calling for greater inclusion of Indigenous knowledge and leadership in science and innovation. In December 2022, he and Langton defended the Voice co-design report against criticism, emphasising its basis in extensive consultations and parliamentary engagement.

In January 2023, Prime Minister Anthony Albanese stated that a legislated Indigenous Voice to Parliament remained a possible alternative should the proposed constitutional referendum fail, amid criticism from Opposition Leader Peter Dutton regarding the level of detail provided about the proposal, which was based on the Calma–Langton co-design framework. On 11 April, Julian Leeser resigned from the Liberal frontbench to campaign in support of the Voice, a move commended by Calma, who also continued to advocate for the co-design report's advisory model, including a 24-member representative Voice linked to local and regional bodies and the implementation of the Uluru Statement from the Heart. In October 2023, Calma participated in a welcoming ceremony at the White House for Prime Minister Albanese, where he referenced a conversation with U.S. President Joe Biden regarding their earlier meeting in 2016 and discussed strengthening relationships between Indigenous Australian and Native American enterprises. On 31 December, Calma concluded his term as Chancellor of the University of Canberra, and was succeeded by Lisa Paul.

=== Australian Tertiary Education Commission (2024–present) ===
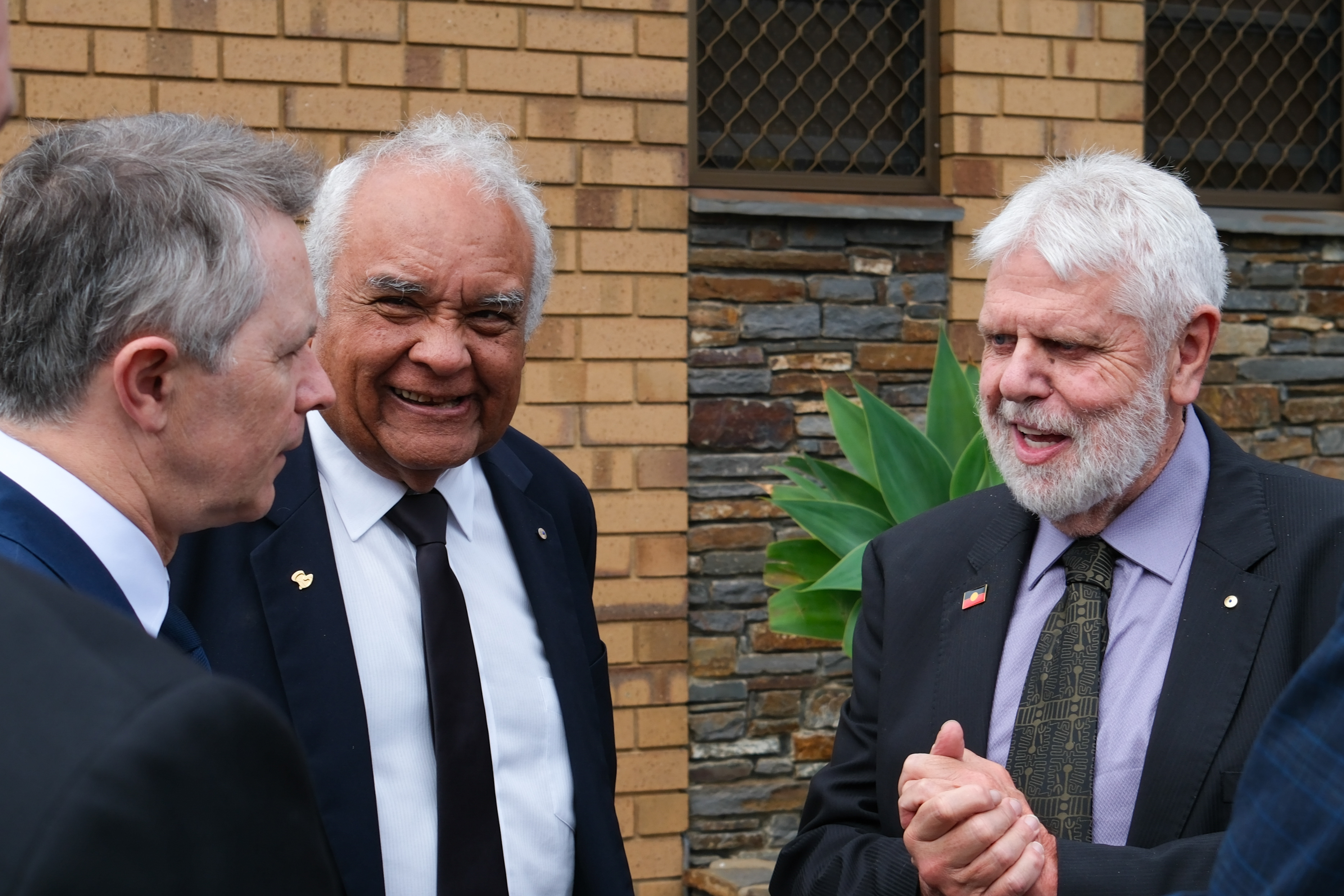
Jason Clare, Calma and Mark Rose at the state funeral of Peter Buckskin in Newton, South Australia, on 12 June 2026

Calma became a member of the Australian Tertiary Education Commission (ATEC) Accord Implementation Advisory Committee in 2024, and received an appointment to the senate of the University of Sydney as a ministerial appointee, while also receiving honours, such as the 2024 Lowitja O'Donoghue Oration and the 2025 Deakin University Indigenous Oration, before becoming Acting First Nations Commissioner of the interim ATEC in January 2026 and participating in the selection process of the new Chancellor of the Australian National University in May 2026.

== Honours and awards ==
Calma has been honoured in 2007 by being named the "Most Influential Indigenous Person in Australia" according to The Bulletin and in 2008 for his contribution in Indigenous affairs he won the GQ Man of Inspiration award. In 2010 he was included in the list of the "50 Most Influential People in medicine in Australia" by the Australian Doctor magazine. On 20 May 2010, Calma received an honorary Doctor of Letters degree from Charles Darwin University in recognition of many years of dedicated public service including contributions to education, training and employment in Indigenous communities. On 15 February 2011 he received an honorary Doctor of Science from Curtin University for his leadership in Indigenous health reform. In 2012 he was appointed an Officer of the Order of Australia in honour of his distinguished service to the Indigenous community especially for his contributions to human rights, social justice and government policy reform as well as cross-cultural awareness. In 2013, he was named Australian Capital Territory (ACT) Australian of the Year in recognition of his lifelong commitment to improving outcomes for Aboriginal and Torres Strait Islander peoples.

On 16 April 2014, Calma was awarded a Doctor of the University degree by Flinders University in recognition of his work, advocacy, and leadership in Indigenous health reform. In 2014, the Tom Calma Award was established to recognise individuals, both Aboriginal and non-Aboriginal, who demonstrate sustained commitment to equity, integrity, and the right to health, particularly in relation to tobacco control and public health. In November 2014, Calma received the Indigenous Allied Health Australia (IAHA) Lifetime Achievement Award for his lifelong contribution to improving the lives of Aboriginal and Torres Strait Islander peoples, and in 2017 he was appointed inaugural patron of IAHA.

In October 2015, Calma was one of four recipients of the University of South Australia Alumni Awards in acknowledgment of his dedication to society. He was awarded the Sidney Sax Public Health Medal from the Public Health Association of Australia in November 2015 for his efforts toward the advancement of public health protection and promotion, especially with respect to community awareness and healthcare delivery equity. The awarding of the Martin Luther King Jr Memorial Flag Award occurred on 1 July 2016 on the 240th anniversary of the independence of the United States. In May 2017, Calma became one of only three Indigenous Australians, alongside Lowitja O'Donoghue and Galarrwuy Yunupingu, to be honored with Australia Post "Indigenous Leaders" Legends Commemorative Stamps in the celebrations of the 50th anniversary of the 1967 referendum. He received recognition when he was honoured inducted in the ACT Honour Walk in 2018. On 26 May 2022, he was elected as Fellow of the Australian Academy of Science, being the first Aboriginal fellow, and on 9 November, he was elected a Fellow of the Academy of the Social Sciences in Australia. On 25 January 2023, he was awarded Senior Australian of the Year, and in November 2023, he was elected Honorary Fellow of the Australian Academy of the Humanities.

On 11 February 2024, Calma was conferred with the position of Professor Emeritus at the University of Canberra. A formal portrait of Calma was revealed on 9 May by artist Vincent Fantauzzo at the University of Canberra as a way of acknowledging the more than a decade of his chancellorship as well as his role in advancing higher education and reconciliation. In recognition of his contribution to building a more inclusive Australia, Calma was granted an honorary Doctor of Letters at the University of Sydney on 24 May. On 21 September, he was conferred with the 2024 ACT Chief Minister's Rotary Peace Prize in acknowledgment of his contribution to peace at the local, national, and international level. Later in the same month, Calma was bestowed with an honorary doctorate from the University of Canberra on the occasion of the first ever graduation ceremony of its health faculty.

== Personal life ==
Calma met his future wife, Heather, while studying in Adelaide. As of 2023, the couple have been married for 45 years and have three children. In 2017, Calma underwent double knee replacement surgery. He is also the owner of a Holden HG, which he spent a decade restoring.

Academic offices
Preceded by John McKay	Chancellor of the University of Canberra; 2014—2023	Succeeded by Lisa Paul
