= Klugmann =

Klugmann is a German surname. Notable people with the surname include:

- Adolf Klügmann (1837–1880), German classical archaeologist and numismatist
- James Klugmann, (1912–1977), British Communist writer
- Joe Klugmann (1895-1951), professional baseball player

== See also ==
- Klugman
