= Mark Kligman =

Professor of Jewish Music

Mark L. Kligman (born 1962) is the Mickey Katz Chair Professor of Jewish Music at the Herb Alpert School of Music, University of California, Los Angeles, a Chair position which was endowed by Katz's family in 2014. and also a published author of 5 books, the highest of which is in 150 libraries. He is also a board member of the Association for Jewish Studies and is the editor of the association's journal, Musica Judaica. He also authored a chapter in The Oxford Handbook of Religion and the Arts.

== Education and early career ==
He received his both Master of Arts and Ph.D. from New York University. After these degrees, he started as a professor at the Hebrew Union College-Jewish Institute of Religion.
