= Marc Kligman =

American lawyer (born 1970)

- Born: Marc Jeffrey Kligman; 1970 (age 55–56); Philadelphia, Pennsylvania, US
- Education: A&S, International Relations and Hispanic and Italian Studies, Johns Hopkins University, 1992; J.D., Tulane University Law School, 1995
- Occupations: Sports agent, criminal lawyer
- Years active: 1995—present
- Spouse: Leah
- Children: 3

Marc Jeffrey Kligman (born 1970) is an American sports agent and criminal lawyer. After working in the San Diego County public defender's office from 1995 to 1998, he founded Total Sports Care Management and began representing players in Minor League and Major League Baseball and NCAA Division I coaches. He is noted for being a practicing Orthodox Jew.

== Early life and education ==
Marc Kligman was born in 1970 in Philadelphia, Pennsylvania and grew up in Stamford, Connecticut. His father, a former United States Army Ranger in Korea, is an international commodities trader. He attended a Jewish day school through sixth grade, although his family wasn't religiously observant.

Kligman played football, basketball, and baseball in high school, earning 10 varsity letters. He played varsity baseball at Johns Hopkins University, from which he graduated in 1992 with an A&S degree in International Relations and Hispanic and Italian Studies. He earned his J.D. at Tulane University Law School in 1995.

== Career ==
Kligman worked for over three years as a criminal trial lawyer in the San Diego County public defender's office, handling 35 criminal jury trials. He started his own criminal defense firm in 1999.

In 1998 he founded Total Sports Care Management and began acquiring clients in his free time. Deciding to combine his affinities for law and sports, in 2000 he was certified by the Major League Baseball Players Association as a sports agent. His services include contract negotiations and player marketing. His clients are players at both the Minor League and Major League level, and NCAA Division I coaches. His Major League clients have included Carlos Ruiz (Philadelphia Phillies), Justin Bour (Philadelphia Phillies), Rob Scahill (Colorado Rockies), and Chris Heston (San Francisco Giants).

Kligman serves as a guest arbiter in the annual National Baseball Arbitration Competition hosted by the Tulane Sports Law Society.

== Other activities ==
After relocating from San Diego to Las Vegas in 2013, Kligman established two independent baseball club teams for 10-year-old and 12-year-old boys, which his two sons joined. Kligman both administers and coaches the teams.

== Personal life ==
During his time at law school, Kligman was introduced to the Chabad community at Tulane University and became interested in Orthodox Jewish observance. He began observing Shabbat and keeping kosher after moving to San Diego, eventually wearing a kippah full-time. He was a baal korei (Torah reader) for the Chabad of University City, taught a weekly Torah class, and founded a "Monday Lunch and Learn" at a local kosher restaurant.

Being Shomer Shabbat, he does not answer calls on Shabbat or attend baseball games on Shabbat and Jewish holidays. This has precluded his attendance at some of the Major League debuts of his clients, including Philadelphia Phillies catcher Carlos Ruiz, who made his debut on a Friday night in May 2006, and Mike Zagurski, who played his first game with the Phillies on Shavuot 2007. Kligman believes that some of his clients who are devoted Christians "feel comfortable with a man of religious values". When the Winter Meetings occur during the Hanukkah holiday, he organizes candle lighting for Jewish attendees.

Kligman and his wife Leah, also an attorney, have two sons and one daughter. In 2017 Kligman hosted many of his clients and other MLB players for his son's Bar Mitzvah at The D Casino Hotel.

Kligman has a first-degree black belt in taekwondo and a Practitioner 4 rank in Krav Maga.

Kligman’s son Elie, an Orthodox Jewish catcher, was selected by the Washington Nationals in the 20th round of the 2021 Major League Baseball draft. A profile described Marc Kligman counselling his son about maintaining Shabbat observance despite possible effects on scholarship and playing opportunities; Elie said that he would not play on the Sabbath.
