= Kristine Klugman =

Australian academic

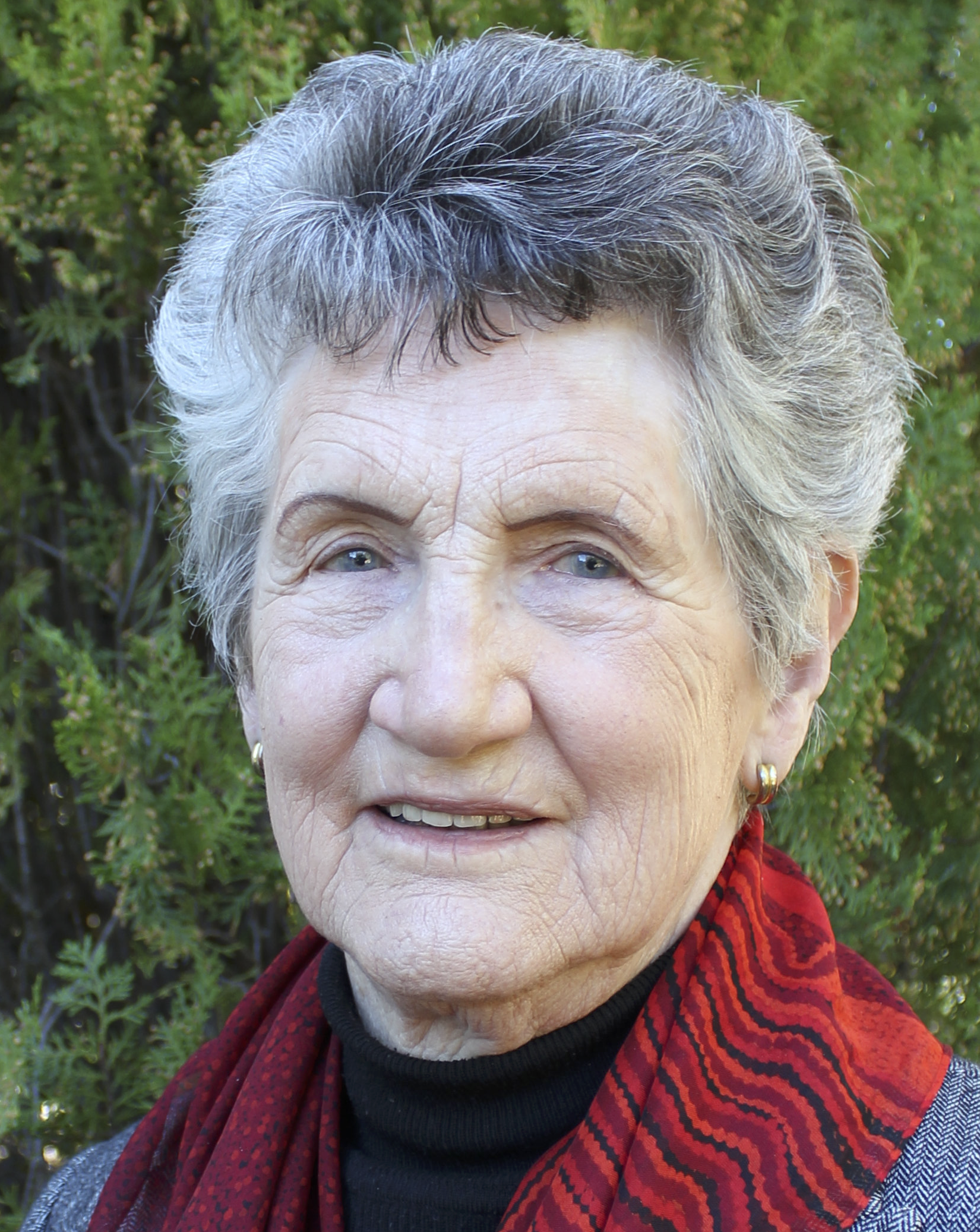
- Klugman in 2007

Kristine Kay Klugman (nee Barnard) is an Australian author, academic and the co-founder of Civil Liberties Australia. Prior to her role as inaugural President of Civil Liberties Australia, she had a career in research, politics and public service, including serving as the first female President of the Trust of the Australian Museum (1984-1988). She was also the first female board member of the Board of Fire Commissioners of NSW in 1982 (then the NSW Fire Brigade, now Fire and Rescue New South Wales), she was later appointed the first full-time deputy president in the organisation's then-100-year history.

== Early life ==
Klugman was born 18 June 1941 in Newcastle, New South Wales before moving to Hobart, Tasmania as a child. She was educated at The Friends' School, Hobart, where her mother was school librarian. She graduated as a nurse from Royal Hobart Hospital and for a year joined a Quaker humanitarian mission to Hong Kong island before returning to complete a midwifery qualification at Crown Street Women's Hospital in Sydney.

She married Richard Klugman ('Dick Klugman'), a general practitioner medico and for 20 years a Member of the House of Representatives for Prospect, with whom she had three children: Jeni Klugman, Julie and Kathy in the 1960s. While her children were young she studied at Macquarie University for her first two degrees where she and John Faulkner (later Senator for NSW 1989-2015 ) founded the university's Labor Club.

Klugman stood unsuccessfully for the NSW state seat of Northcott in 1978.

She joined the Trust of The Australian Museum as a member in 1978 and became its first-ever female president (1984-1988). She also served on the then-NSW Legal Aid Commission and worked as a researcher for the NSW Bureau of Crime Statistics and Research.

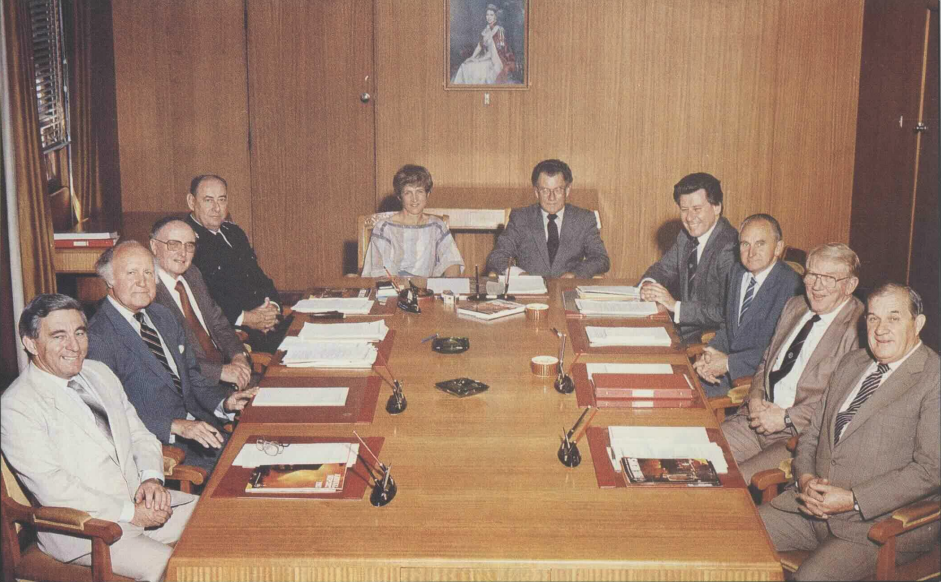
Klugman with the Board of the Fire Commissioners of NSW, 1984

Appointed as the first female board member of the Board of Fire Commissioners of NSW in 1982 (then the NSW Fire Brigade, now Fire and Rescue New South Wales), she was later appointed the first full-time deputy president in the organisation's then-100-year history. There she fought successfully to introduce promotion by merit rather than seniority and better education options for firefighters. To prove women could meet the requirements, Kris (then aged in her 40s) undertook the full range of physical assessments then required to become a (male) firefighter. Passing the test, she convinced the board to introduce the option for females in NSW to become full-time firefighters. She also served on the NSW bushfire and rescue coordinating committees.

In 1987 she received a medal in the Order of Australia ('OAM') for service to education and to social welfare of the community.

Klugman helped to secure the site and building for the Penrith Museum of Fire in NSW and served on the interim committee of the Australian National Maritime Museum from 1988 to 1991.

Following a period of time as a researcher at the Victorian State Government-run CIRCIT communications and IT think-tank, she moved to a rural property near Canberra to raise and train Arab horses and undertake a PhD in Political Communication at the Australian National University. For Rotary, she long-time partner Bill Rowlings OAM mounted an exhibition at the National Museum of Australia and venues in Sydney, Brisbane and Perth on the worldwide polio eradication campaign.

== Establishment of Civil Liberties Australia ==
In 2003, Klugman and Bill Rowlings co-founded Civil Liberties Australia, a national freedoms and rights body headquartered in Canberra. Civil Liberties Australia has since established strong sub-groups in Western Australia, the Northern Territory and Tasmania, where traditional liberties groups had folded.

Klugman served as inaugural President of Civil Liberties Australia from 2003 until 2021. Together, she and Rowlings co-authored an online history, The History of Civil Liberties in Australia. She remains on the Board of Civil Liberties Australia.

In 2015, Klugman and Bill Rowlings were awarded the Australian Lawyers Alliance (ALA) National Civil Justice Award.
