= Jeni Klugman =

Jeni Klugman is a development economist. She is managing director of the Institute for Women, Peace and Security at Georgetown University and a fellow at the Kennedy School of Government's Women in Public Policy Program at Harvard University. She was formerly Director of Gender and Development at the World Bank Group, where she served as lead spokesperson on gender equality issues and was responsible for developing strategic directions to support the institution's gender and development priorities. She also serves or has served on several advisory boards, including the World Economic Forum's advisory board on Sustainability and Competitiveness, and those related to the work of the Council on Foreign Relations, Plan International, International Civil Society Network, UNDP 2013 World Report on Democratic Governance, and a European Union research program on GDP and beyond. Prior to taking up this position in August 2011, Klugman was the director and lead author of three global Human Development Reports published by the United Nations Development Programme: Overcoming Barriers: Human Mobility and Development (2009); The Real Wealth of Nations: Pathways to Human Development (2010); and Sustainability and Equity: a Better Future for All (2011). From 1992 to 2008, she held various positions at the World Bank, focusing in particular on poverty, inequality, and human development in low-income countries in Africa, Europe, and Asia. Klugman has published a number of books, papers and reports on topics ranging from poverty reduction strategies and labor markets to conflict, health reform, education, and decentralization. She holds a Ph.D. in economics from the Australian National University, as well as postgraduate degrees in Law and Development Economics from Oxford University, where she was a Rhodes Scholar Jeni is the daughter of former Labor MP, Richard Klugman ('Dick Klugman'), and civil libertarian Kristine Klugman.
