= Stephen Parker (legal scholar) =

British legal scholar

Stephen John Parker AO is a legal academic and practitioner who was Vice-Chancellor of the University of Canberra 2007-2016. He was made an Officer in the Order of Australia in 2014 for services to tertiary education.

== Education ==
Professor Parker was born in the north of England. He graduated from the University of Newcastle-upon-Tyne with a Bachelor of Laws. He went on to obtain a PhD from the University of Wales.

== Law ==
He practised law in the UK before moving to Australia in 1988.

Professor Parker is a Barrister and Solicitor of the Supreme Court of the Australian Capital Territory, Barrister-at-Law of the Supreme Court of Queensland and Solicitor of the Supreme Court of England and Wales.

== Academic life ==
He first worked as an academic at University College, Cardiff.

Between 1988 and 1994, he was Senior Lecturer and Reader in law at the Australian National University. He was then Professor of Law at Griffith University.

In 1999, he was appointed Dean of Monash University Law School, a position he held until 2003. He then became Deputy Vice-Chancellor of Monash University.

He was appointed Vice-Chancellor of the University of Canberra in 2007 and was profiled on ABC Radio due to his opposition in 2014-15 to proposals to deregulate higher education fees in Australia. In September 2015, Parker announced that he would retire from the University of Canberra in July 2016, having served nine years (two terms) in the position. He briefly returned to the role as Interim Vice-Chancellor in September 2024, but resigned after less than three months, claiming he had lost confidence in the University Council.

He is currently an Honorary Professorial Fellow at the Melbourne Centre for the Study of Higher Education, University of Melbourne.

== Podcast and Publications ==
With Emeritus Professor Stephen Bottomley, he co-hosts a podcast series, Law in Context, designed as a critical introduction to law for the general public and intending student.

His books include the first and second editions of Law in Context, Informal Marriage, Cohabitation and the Law 1750-1989, Courts and the Public, the first and second editions of Australian Family Law in Context, Negotiating By The Light of the Law, three editions of Cohabitees, and Cohabitants.

He has written numerous articles and chapters on higher education, legal philosophy, contract law, family law, judges and lawyers, including "Rebuilding a sustainable and fair tertiary education system for Australia", "Rights and Utility in Anglo-Australian Family Law", "Rule Following, Rule Scepticism and Indeterminacy in Law", and "Judicial Independence" in The Australian Federal Judicial System.
