= Dick Klugman =

Australian politician

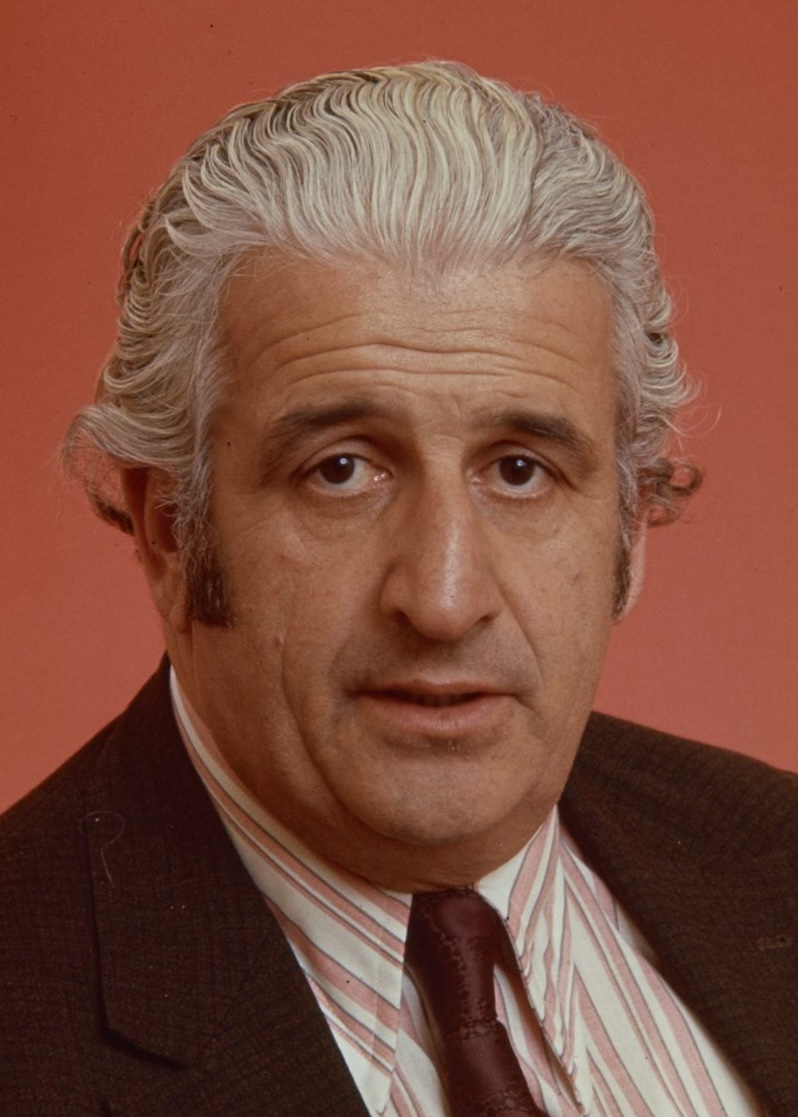
- Klugman in 1974

Member of the Australian Parliament for Prospect
- In office 25 October 1969 – 19 February 1990
- Preceded by: New seat
- Succeeded by: Janice Crosio

Personal details
- Born: 13 January 1924 Vienna, Austria
- Died: 21 February 2011 (aged 87) Sydney
- Party: Australian Labor Party
- Spouse(s): Kristine Klugman, Margaret Healy
- Children: 4, incl. Jeni Klugman
- Education: University of Sydney
- Occupation: Doctor, politician

Richard Emanuel Klugman (18 January 1924 – 21 February 2011) was an Australian doctor, activist and politician. He was a member of the Australian Labor Party (ALP) and served in the House of Representatives from 1969 to 1990, representing the New South Wales seat of Prospect.

== Early life ==
Klugman was born in Vienna on 18 January 1924, the son of Ella and Bernard Klugman, Polish-born Italian nationals. His father was a Jewish businessman and the family left Austria in 1938 to escape antisemitism. He attended Hurlstone Agricultural High School and the University of Sydney, where he studied science and medicine. He worked part-time as a builder's labourer and clerk while at university. He was the president of the Sydney University Labor Club and the Australian Student Labor Federation.

In 1947 he was charged with using indecent language, assaulting a policeman, and resisting arrest in relation with a demonstration outside the Dutch consulate during the Indonesian War of Independence. He pleaded not guilty and alleged that he was a victim of police brutality.

After graduating, Klugman practised as a doctor in the Sydney suburbs of Guildford and Villawood. He was an honorary officer at Liverpool Hospital, Parramatta Hospital and Royal North Shore Hospital.

In 1963 he was co-founder together with Ken Buckley and Jack Sweeney QC of the NSW Council for Civil Liberties.

== Politics and activism ==
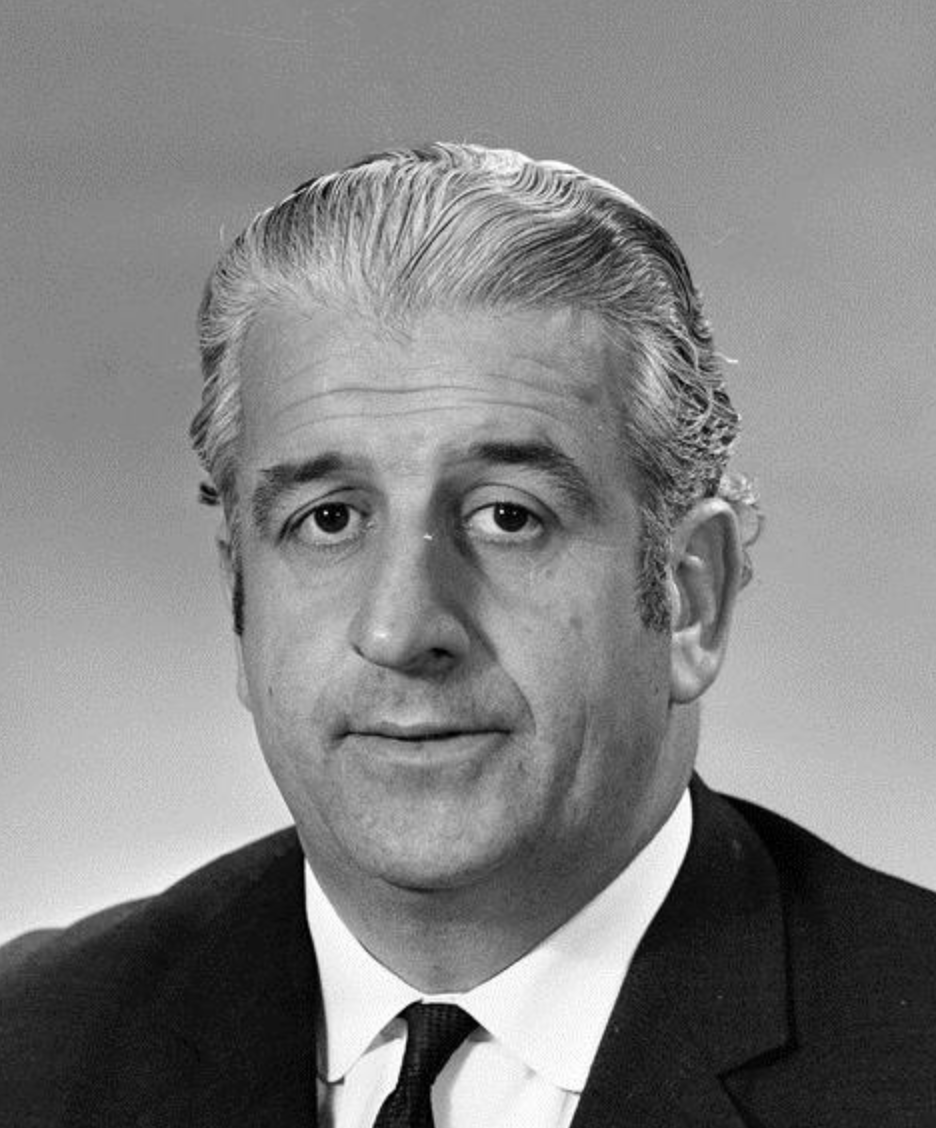
Klugman in 1970

In 1969, Klugman was elected to the Australian House of Representatives as the Labor member for the new seat of Prospect, a western-Sydney constituency. Klugman held the seat of Prospect until his retirement in 1990. He was the first refugee to become a federal member. In his first speech to Parliament, among other issues, he commented on the legalisation of cannabis and the removal of laws against homosexuality, abortion, censorship and prostitution.

During his time as a Member of Parliament he did not hold any ministerial offices, commenting in 1989 that "I wouldn’t make a good Minister" because of his willingness to play the "devil's advocate." He established the world's first Parliamentary Amnesty Group and was a delegate to the United Nations General Assembly in 1973. He was one of four federal parliamentarians who left the House of Representatives in 1976 before a vote to express condolences for the recently deceased Chairman Mao. Klugman was the Chair of the Joint Select Committee on Video Material, convened in 1984 and beginning work in 1985 after New South Wales, Victoria, South Australia, Western Australia and Queensland banned the sale and showing of X-rated videos.

After retirement, Klugman was a member of the Australian National University council for 20 years. His papers are held at the National Library of Australia.

== Personal life ==
Klugman married Karin Joseph in 1953, with whom he had one daughter. He remarried in 1964 to Kristine Barnard, with whom he had another three daughters. Their daughter Jeni was the first female Rhodes Scholar from New South Wales. His third marriage was to Margaret Healy.

Klugman died in Sydney on 21 February 2011.

Parliament of Australia
Preceded by new seat	Member for Prospect; 1969–1990	Succeeded by Janice Crosio
