= Division of Prospect =

Former Australian federal electoral division

Prospect Australian House of Representatives Division
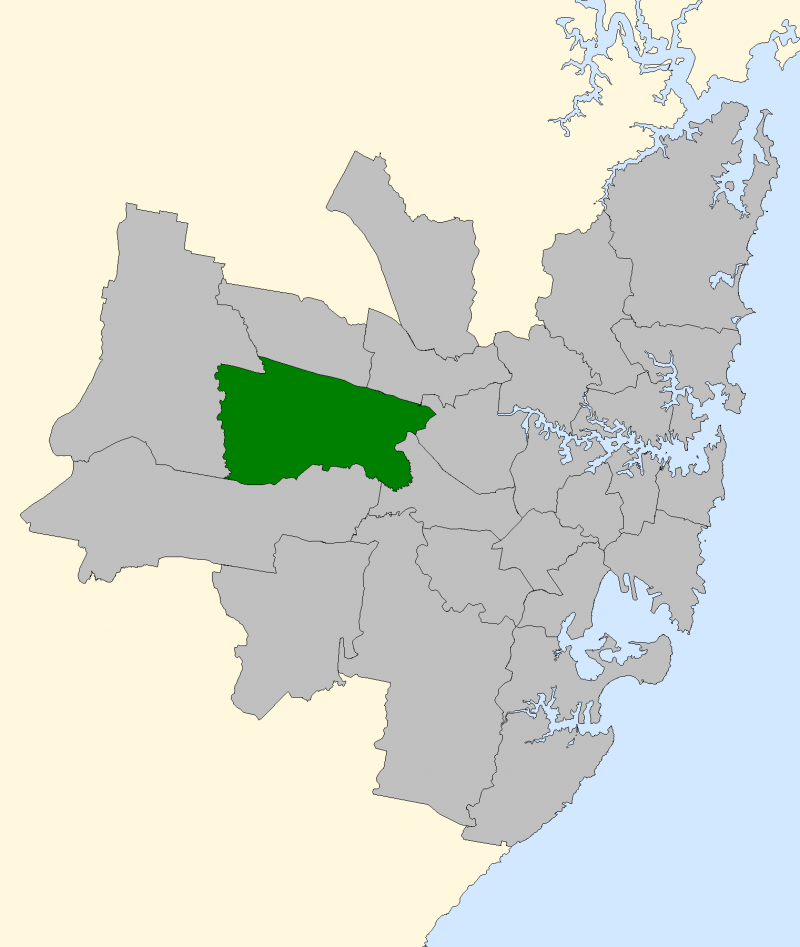
- Division of Prospect (green) in New South Wales
- Created: 1969
- Abolished: 2010
- Namesake: Prospect Reservoir
- Electors: 90,624
- Area: 164 km^{2} (63.3 sq mi)
- Demographic: Outer metropolitan

The Division of Prospect was an Australian Electoral Division in the state of New South Wales from 1969 to 2010. It was located in the western suburbs of Sydney, and included the suburbs of Fairfield, Smithfield, Kemps Creek, St Clair, Horsley Park and those parts of the suburb of Prospect south of the Great Western Highway which were the least populous parts of the suburb. The Prospect Reservoir was located within the Division, from which it took its name.

The origins of the Division date back to the redistribution of 21 November 1968, and was first contested at the 1969 Federal election. The seat was a safe Labor seat for its entire existence.

Following the 2009 redistribution of New South Wales, the division was renamed McMahon to honour former prime minister Sir William McMahon. McMahon was first contested at the 2010 federal election.

== Members ==
Image	Member	Party	Term	Notes
	Dick Klugman (1924–2011)	Labor	25 October 1969 – 19 February 1990	Retired
	Janice Crosio (1939–)	Labor	24 March 1990 – 31 August 2004	Previously held the New South Wales Legislative Assembly seat of Smithfield. Retired
	Chris Bowen (1973–)	Labor	9 October 2004 – 21 August 2010	Served as minister under Rudd and Gillard. Transferred to the Division of McMahon after Prospect was abolished in 2010
