= National Sorry Day =

Annual Australian event on 26 May

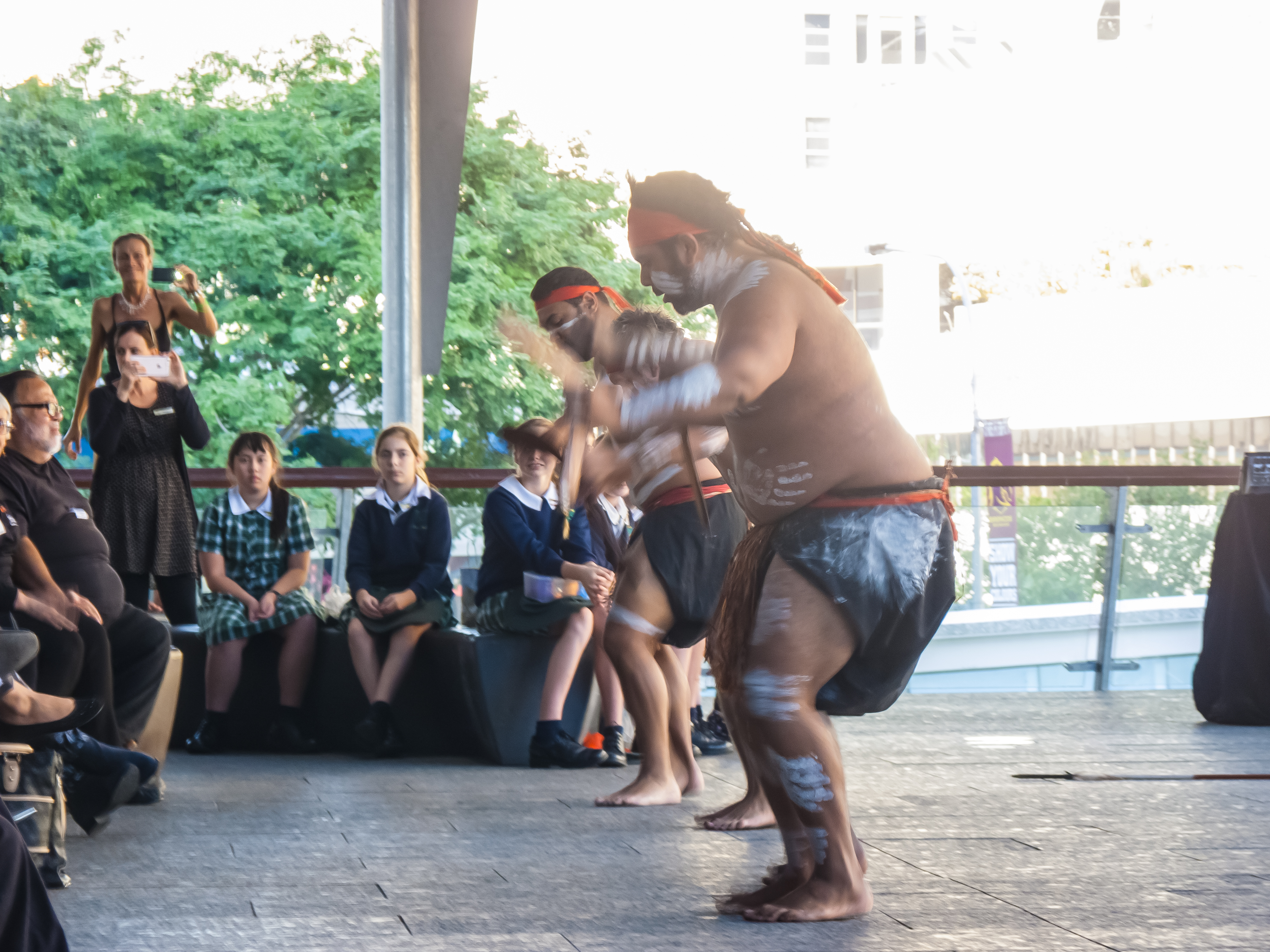
- 2016 National Sorry Day event in Brisbane
- Also called: National Day of Healing
- Observed by: Australia
- Type: Cultural
- Significance: Commemoration of the Stolen Generations
- Date: 26 May
- Next time: 26 May 2027
- Frequency: Annually
- First time: 26 May 1998

National Sorry Day, officially the National Day of Healing, is an event held annually in Australia on 26 May commemorating the Stolen Generations. It is part of the ongoing efforts towards reconciliation between Indigenous and non-Indigenous Australians.

The first National Sorry Day was held on the first anniversary of the 1997 Bringing Them Home report. It examined the government practices and policies which led to the Stolen Generations and recommended support and reparations to the Indigenous population. In 2008, Prime Minister Kevin Rudd issued a formal apology for the mistreatment of Indigenous Australians on behalf of the federal government. National Sorry Day has also inspired many public acts of solidarity and support for reconciliation.

Protests have also been held on Sorry Day, with protestors arguing that Indigenous children have continued to be forcibly relocated under the child protection system and government systems have failed to adequately support them. Although there have been efforts implemented by state governments, a national reparation scheme has not been established.

== History ==
National Sorry Day is an annual event in Australia on 26 May. It commemorates the Stolen Generations — the Aboriginal Australian and Torres Strait Islander children who were forcibly separated from their families in an attempt to assimilate them into white Australian culture during the 20th century.

=== "Bringing Them Home" and history of government reparations ===
The first National Sorry Day was held on 26 May 1998 by a coalition of Australian community groups. Among others, "Uncle Bob" Randall and his daughter Dorothea performed at the commemoration, which marked one year after the 1997 Bringing Them Home report was tabled in Australian Parliament. The report was the result of an inquiry into the government policies and practices which caused the Stolen Generations. Among its fifty-four recommendations were that funding be allocated for Indigenous healing services and that reparations should be made in the form of formal apologies.

Prime Minister John Howard refused to issue an apology and said that he did not believe genocide was committed against Indigenous Australians. In 1999, he passed a Motion of Reconciliation expressing "deep and sincere regret that indigenous Australians suffered injustices under the practices of past generations", but his administration argued that "it was not responsible for the actions of past governments and that admissions of wrongdoing could open the door to compensation suits." His successor Kevin Rudd issued a formal apology in February 2008 on behalf of the federal government, becoming the first Prime Minister to do so in an official capacity.

However, many of the report's recommendations have not or only been partially implemented. Sorry Day protestors also argue that routine removal of children from Indigenous families continues under the auspices of child welfare, as Indigenous children are overrepresented in the child protection system and out-of-home care. The number of Indigenous children in out-of-home care rose from 9,070 in 2008 to about 18,900 in 2022. A national reparation scheme has not been established, although there has been monetary compensation in various states and territories. Writing for The Conversation, professor Bronwyn Carlson noted that many members of the Stolen Generations have died before being able to be compensated, and compensation is unable to be forwarded to their families. ABC News reported in 2023 that Indigenous Australians have faced abuse from the non-Indigenous community around the time of Sorry Day, questioning why they should apologise.

In 2005, the National Sorry Day Committee renamed the day the National Day of Healing, with the motion tabled in Parliament by Senator Aden Ridgeway. In his words: "the day will focus on the healing needed throughout Australian society if we are to achieve reconciliation".

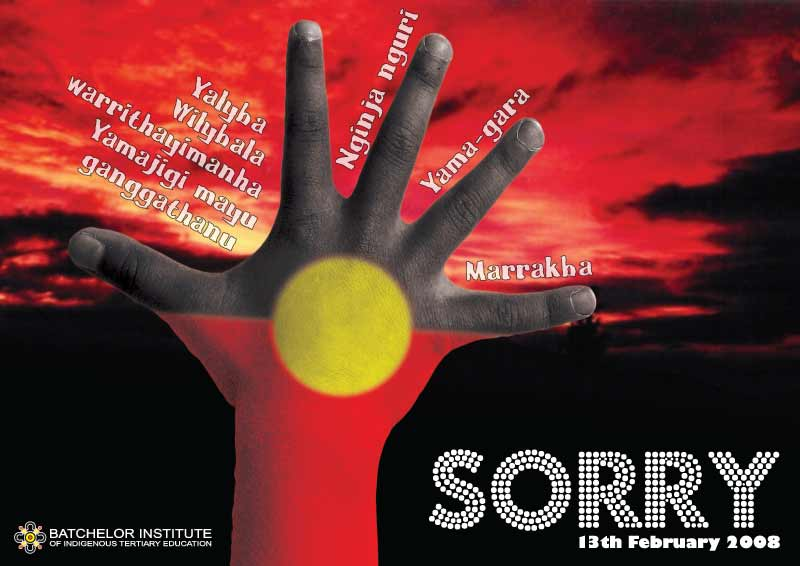
A commemorative poster from 2008

=== Public reconciliation acts ===
The Bringing Them Home report has inspired many public acts of reconciliation. On 28 May 2000, more than 250,000 people, both Indigenous and non-Indigenous Australians, participated in a walk across Sydney Harbour Bridge organised by the Council for Aboriginal Reconciliation to protest the lack of a government apology to Indigenous people, show solidarity and to raise public awareness. Members of the public also had a plane write "sorry" above the bridge the same day.

The Uluru Statement from the Heart was released on Sorry Day in 2017.

== In media ==
Authors Anne Coombs and Susan Varga described their attendance at a Sorry Day in Broome, Western Australia in 1999, a town with a large proportion of Indigenous Australians:

In the afternoon we went to a ceremony on the site of the former Catholic orphanage. Chairs were arranged in a semicircle on a scrappy piece of open ground. When everyone was assembled – there were maybe a hundred and fifty people – the dull religious music that had been playing changed to Archie Roach's 'Taking the Children Away' (..) As the music played, a few Aboriginal women in the audience wept.

== See also ==
- Day of Mourning (Australia), 26 January 1938
- Harmony Day
- Mabo Day
- NAIDOC Week
- National Reconciliation Week
- Reconciliation Australia
- Reconciliation in Australia
- 1967 Australian referendum (Aboriginals)

=== Other countries ===
- I Apologize campaign, a grassroots initiative in Turkey
- Native American Day
- National Day for Truth and Reconciliation, Canada
