= Tanya Hosch =

Australian social activist

Tanya Hosch AM
- Occupations: Social activist and business executive

Tanya Hosch AM is a Torres Strait Islander social activist and business executive. She has held leadership roles in sport, the arts, social justice and public policy. She was joint campaign manager of the "Recognise" campaign run by Reconciliation Australia from 2012 to 2016. At her appointment as social inclusion manager to the Australian Football League (AFL) in June 2016, she became the first Indigenous Australian person and the second woman appointed to an executive position in the AFL.

== Early life and education ==
Hosch's biological mother, a white woman, was of Welsh origin, while her biological father is a Torres Strait Islander man. She was adopted by a white Australian woman and an Aboriginal Australian man after her parents' 16-year-old eldest child was killed in a car accident. The fact that she was adopted was never hidden from her, and her adoptive home was a loving, caring and stable one, although money was tight and her parents worked very hard.

She experienced racism at school, which affected her confidence. She completed secondary school at Enfield High School, in Adelaide's northern suburbs.

She did not expect to go to university, thinking that was for clever people, starting work at the Women's Information Switchboard (Note: Women's Information Switchboard (WIS), later Women's Information Service, was then a mainly volunteer-run service opened in 1978 by SA premier Don Dunstan, then in the Institute Building on the corner of North Terrace and Kintore Avenue.) instead. Being a feminist organisation, colleagues encouraged her to attend university, which she did and loved, studying social work part-time.

== Career ==
Hosch was led into advocacy for Indigenous Australians when she was working in the public sector and was placed at the Australian Human Rights Commission in Sydney soon after the publication of the Bringing Them Home report on Aboriginal children stolen from their families in 1997. Later that year she attended the Reconciliation Convention, where Pat Dodson delivered an address which proved a turning point for her.

Hosch held advocacy and consulting high-level public sector roles, including at the Council for Aboriginal Reconciliation. (Note: The predecessor of Reconciliation Australia.) She connected with Larissa Behrendt in Canberra, and became friends with Jason Glanville. She was instrumental in the creation of the National Congress of Australia's First Peoples, and a foundation director of the Australian Indigenous Leadership Centre and the Australian Indigenous Governance Institute.

=== 2012–2016: "Recognise" campaign ===
From 2012 Hosch was joint campaign director (with Tim Gartrell) of the "Recognise" campaign run by Reconciliation Australia. The campaign followed the recommendations of the Expert Panel on Recognising Aboriginal and Torres Strait Islander Peoples in the Constitution. Hosch was also the public face of the campaign, after addressing the National Press Club in February 2013. In May 2013, her team toured Australia aiming to inform and involve people in the bid to get Indigenous people recognised in the Australian Constitution. This included public advocacy, building support and partnerships behind the scenes, and consulting Aboriginal people in remote areas. Beginning in Melbourne and finishing at Nhulunbuy in the Northern Territory, the trail was inspired by the "Long Walk" from Melbourne to Canberra undertaken in 2004 by AFL footballer Michael Long. On 13 February 2013, Hosch addressed the National Press Club. The title of her address, delivered with Jason Glanville, was "Recognition: Why It's Right".

The campaign was highly successful, raising awareness of the issue from around 30% to 70%, winding up in 2017.

=== 2016: AFL social inclusion manager ===
Hosch was named the general manager of inclusion and social policy at the AFL in June 2016, beating Nova Peris to the role. She became the second female executive at the AFL, and the first Indigenous person in such a role.

Her term started on 29 August 2016, and as of April 2023 she remains social inclusion manager.

Hosch advocated for the creation of a statue of Nicky Winmar (the first of an Indigenous player, erected at Perth Stadium in 2019), and helped to bring about an apology by AFL for Adam Goodes, after they had handled his 2015 crowd abuse badly.

== Other roles ==
Hosch has served as chair of Price Waterhouse Coopers Indigenous Consulting, and served on the board of Bangarra Dance Theatre. She has been a director of the Indigenous Land Corporation, the Australian Leadership Centre, the Australian Centre for Social Innovation, the Australian Indigenous Governance Institute, and the Australian Red Cross Society.

She was appointed to the Review Panel for the Act of Recognition in 2013 to provide a report to the Minister for Aboriginal Affairs. The final report of the panel was published in September 2014.

Hosch was one of 16 members of the Referendum Council, which was appointed by the prime minister Malcolm Turnbull and leader of the opposition Bill Shorten on 7 December 2015 "to talk to Australians about changing our Constitution to recognise Aboriginal and Torres Strait Islander peoples". The Council handed down its final report on 30 June 2017.

As of April 2023 she is a member of Chief Executive Women and the NAB Indigenous Advisory Group, as well as a board member of Circus Oz. She joined the board of the Coaxial Foundation in 2024.

== Recognition ==
- 2013: Named in the South Australian Women's Honour Roll.
- 2012, 2013, and 2015: Recognised in the list of "100 Women of Influence" Awards run by Westpac and the Australian Financial Review.
- 2014: Nominated in the Human Rights category of Daily Life Women of the Year.
- 2015: Named in the Australian Women's Weekly Power List of Australia's 50 most powerful women.
- 2021: Listed as 6th in "the top 10 most culturally powerful people in Australia" by the Australian Financial Review.
- 2021: South Australian of the Year.
- November 2022: The Sydney Morning Herald's Sunday Life listed Hosch as one of 25 trailblazers: "women reshaping Australia".
- 2026 Australia Day Honours: Member of the Order of Australia for "significant service to the community through social policy, and as an advocate for diversity and inclusion"

== Personal life ==
Hosch has a daughter.

== Oral history ==
Hosch has been interviewed twice for the Seven Years On - continuing life histories of Aboriginal leaders project, once in 2002, and again in 2017. These recordings can be found at the National Library of Australia.
