= Jason Glanville =

Wiradjuri Indigenous community leader in central New South Wales, Australia

- Born: Australia
- Occupation: Indigenous rights advocate
- Employer(s): National Centre of Indigenous Excellence, Reconciliation Australia
- Known for: Indigenous Australian community leader
- Title: Chief Executive Officer (CEO) of National Centre of Indigenous Excellence

Jason Glanville is a member of the Wiradjuri people of central New South Wales, Australia, and a leader in the Indigenous community.

== Career ==
Glanville has held senior positions in a number of organisations dedicated to Aboriginal and Torres Strait Islander peoples. He has also worked for the Commonwealth Government and Queensland State Government.

=== Reconciliation Australia ===
Prior to 2009 Jason Glanville was appointed the Director of Policy and Strategy for Reconciliation Australia. He was mentored by Mick Dodson. In 2009, Paul O'Callaghan was chosen over Jason Glanville as the chief executive officer of Reconciliation Australia. Following the announcement, fellow staff members at Reconciliation Australia as well as Indigenous activists across the country reacted in "shock and disbelief".

In 2010, Glanville was named as one of Sydney's 100 Most Influential People, and in 2011 he was named as one of Boss Magazine's True Leaders of 2011.

=== National Centre of Indigenous Excellence ===
As of 2012 Glanville was the chief executive officer of the National Centre of Indigenous Excellence, a "not-for-profit social enterprise that aims to build capability and create opportunities with and for Aboriginal and Torres Strait Islander peoples across Australia". His "big picture" for the centre was to have it change Redfern from "a place notorious for chronic unemployment, lawlessness, drugs and alcohol into a centre for learning and culture". As of October 2021 he is no longer in that role.

=== National Press Club address ===
On 13 February 2013, Glanville addressed the National Press Club. The title of his address, delivered with Tanya Hosch, was "Recognition: Why It's Right." On the same day, a photograph of Glanville and Hosch, with Indigenous leader Patrick Dodson, was published on the front page of The Australian newspaper.

== Other roles ==
As of 2012 Glanville was also a co-director of the Ngiya Institute for Indigenous Policy, Law and Practice, a Trustee of the Australian Museum and a board member of the Australian Indigenous Leadership Centre.
