= Reconciliation in Australia =

Movement to improve relations between Indigenous and non-Indigenous Australians

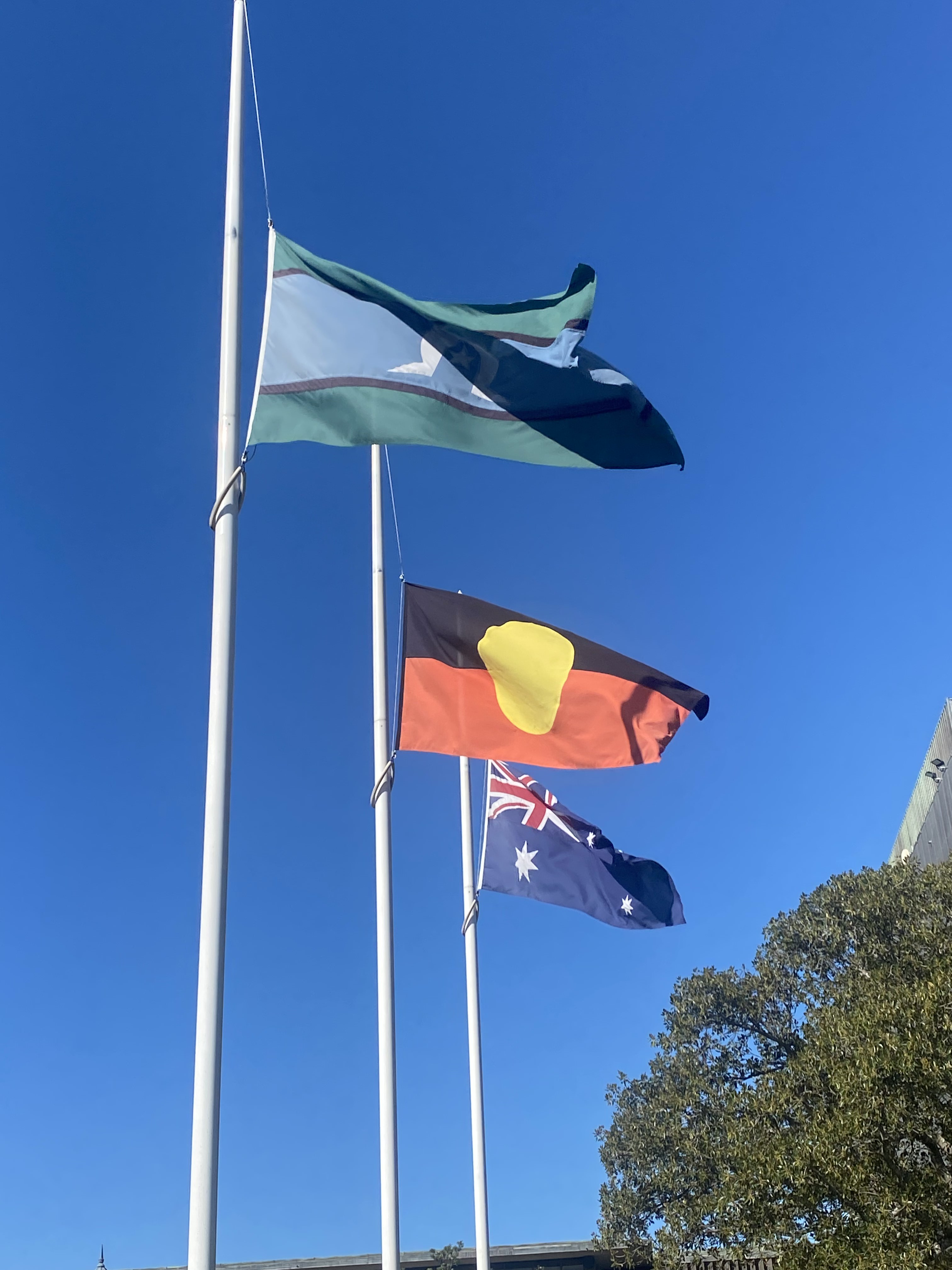
The Torres Strait Islander, Aboriginal and Australian national flags

Reconciliation in Australia is a process which officially began in 1991, focused on the improvement of relations between the Aboriginal and Torres Strait Islander peoples of Australia and the rest of the population. The Council for Aboriginal Reconciliation (CAR), created by the government for a term of ten years, laid the foundations for the process, and created the peak body for implementation of reconciliation as a government policy, Reconciliation Australia, in 2001.

== Background ==
=== Guugu Yimithirr and James Cook ===
The first act of reconciliation between Indigenous Australians and non-Indigenous people followed Lieutenant James Cook's 1770 landing at the site of modern Cooktown. Cook and his crew had developed a friendly relationship with the local people, recording more than 130 words of their language. However, after the crew refused to share 12 green turtles which they had caught, thus violating local customs, the locals became angry. A Guugu Yimithirr elder stepped in, presenting Cook with a broken-tipped spear as a peace offering, thus preventing an escalation which could have ended in bloodshed. The event has been re-enacted every year since 1959 with the support and participation of many of the local Guugu Yimithirr people.

=== Modern day ===
The term first entered the language of politics after the election of Bob Hawke as Prime Minister of Australia in 1983. In opposition before his election, his election campaign had focused on a "national reconciliation, national recovery and national reconstruction", under the slogan "Bringing Australia Together". His speech launching Labor's campaign explained what the concept might mean for Australia:

Another area of unresolved conflict involves the Aboriginal people of this country – the first Australians. As a group, they continue to experience the worst health, housing, employment, education, and the greatest poverty and despair. While this situation persists, we can never truly bring this country together.
Central to this question is the issue of land rights. A Labor government will not hesitate to use, where necessary, the constitutional powers of the Commonwealth to provide for Aboriginal people to own the land which has for years been set aside for them.

Hawke's time in office brought a policy shift around Indigenous Australian self-determination and Indigenous land rights in Australia.

The final report of the Royal Commission into Aboriginal Deaths in Custody was published in April 1991, with one of its recommendations the initiation of a process of reconciliation between Aboriginal and non-Aboriginal Australians. At the time, there was some criticism of the term and concept as a "politically soft option", a replacement for pursuing more concrete aims for justice for Indigenous peoples, such as land rights and a treaty. Another criticism was that the term implies that there was once a state of peaceful co-existence between settlers and Indigenous peoples which would be restored by re-conciliation.

== The concept ==
The concept of reconciliation includes both practical and symbolic features. It involves recognising and acknowledging that Indigenous peoples are the traditional owners of the whole of Australia, and that past injustices that have led to present-day consequences for Indigenous peoples, as well as increasing understanding by non-Indigenous people of Aboriginal peoples' cultures and attachment to country and working to reduce racism in Australia. Practical matters include improving health, education and employment prospects for Aboriginal and Torres Strait Islander people.

== 1991–2001: Council for Aboriginal Reconciliation ==
However, there was general support for the move towards reconciliation, and the Council for Aboriginal Reconciliation Act 1991 was passed on 2 September 1991, to establish the Council for Aboriginal Reconciliation (CAR), for a limited lifespan of 10 years. The establishment of the council was an acknowledgement of past policies which had done harm to Aboriginal peoples, and its purpose was to guide the process of reconciliation in the nation over the coming decade, which would end with the celebration of centenary since the Federation of Australia. Its terms including addressing Aboriginal disadvantage in three key areas: employment, health and economic development, and CAR soon identified eight issues which were essential to the process of reconciliation:

- Understanding country
- Improving relationships
- Valuing cultures
- Sharing history
- Addressing disadvantage
- Custody levels of Indigenous people
- Aboriginal people controlling their own destiny
- Formal documentation of the process

Pat Dodson was the first chair of CAR. Several external events influenced the three terms of CAR during its decade of existence. The Mabo case, followed by the Wik decision (1996) led to pastoralists feeling threatened by the possible granting of native title over their land, and lobbied the by then more receptive Howard government to amend the Native Title Act 1993. The resulting "Wik amendments", along with a huge reduction in funding to ATSIC, damaged cross-party agreement on reconciliation.

CAR followed a "hearts and minds" awareness strategy during its existence, seeking to gain press coverage across all levels of media. It staged large events such as the Australian Reconciliation Convention in 1997, which was broadcast live on television, ran cross-cultural workshops for journalists, and produced social science research on community attitudes towards reconciliation. Its quarterly publication Walking Together and material such as badges and stickers were given to schools and local governments. It soon became a "people's movement" with hundreds of local community reconciliation groups founded across the country. Coordinators known as Australians for Reconciliation (AFR), appointed by CAR, promoted initiatives to help the movement. CAR members sought meetings with leaders, and conducted three major public consultation events and hundreds of meetings, evoking over 3,000 response forms from individuals.

In 1995, the Aboriginal and Torres Strait Islander flags were recognised.

In 1997, the Australian Reconciliation Conference was held in Melbourne.

In 1999, federal parliament passed a Motion of Reconciliation, as negotiated by Senator Aden Ridgeway and then prime minister John Howard, but it fell short of an apology and opinions on its effectiveness were divided.

=== Corroboree 2000 ===
"Corroboree 2000" was a two-day event at the Sydney Opera House held in CAR's final year of existence, taking place from 27 to 28 May 2000. On the first day, a meeting of dozens of Indigenous and non-Indigenous leaders at the Sydney Opera House was again broadcast live on TV, and was covered by around 500 media outlets. One issue loomed large: that of an apology by the Australian Government to its Indigenous peoples, and in particular the Stolen Generations, after the 1997 Bringing Them Home report had mapped the extent of and ongoing results of the government policy of assimilation in the past, which had included removing Indigenous children from their parents.

The Australian Declaration Towards Reconciliation and the Roadmap to Reconciliation were presented to the state premiers, the Governor-General of Australia, Sir William Deane, and Prime Minister John Howard. Many members of the audience turned their backs on Howard after he said that it was not the responsibility of the present generation to apologise for past practices. The two documents laid out four strategies, relating to economic independence for Indigenous peoples; overcoming disadvantage; the recognition of rights; and continuing the reconciliation process. A reconciliation canvas was created containing the handprints of all of the participating leaders, a highly symbolic act in Aboriginal traditions.

=== Walk for Reconciliation ===
As part of Corroboree 2000, on 28 May 2000 over 250,000 people walked across the Sydney Harbour Bridge in solidarity, on the Walk for Reconciliation (AKA Reconciliation Walk or Bridge Walk), streaming across the bridge from the northern to the southern end for nearly six hours. The event took place as part of Reconciliation Week, and had been planned since 1995. Among the Indigenous walkers were Faith Bandler and Bonita Mabo, widow of land rights campaigner Eddie Mabo, and many members of the Stolen Generations. It was the largest political demonstration in Australian history. An aeroplane wrote "Sorry" in the sky. A memorial plaque was erected at the southern end of Sydney Harbour Bridge in 2004 to commemorate the occasion.

Similar events took place around the country on the same day and in subsequent months. The Brisbane walk across the William Jolly Bridge a week later attracted around 60,000 people, while 55,000 people crossed the Torrens River on the King William Street Bridge in Adelaide, and in Hobart they crossed the Tasman Bridge. At the end of the year, the Melbourne event drew 300,000 and in Perth huge crowds crossed the Swan River Causeway.

Although the walks were organised by Aboriginal people, they were attended by Australians representing all sectors of society and ethnicities. The huge attendances showed that there was increasing public awareness of the need for reconciliation and for a national apology.

=== CAR's final report ===
At the close of CAR's decade of existence, after noting that the biggest obstacles to reconciliation were entrenched disadvantage, discrimination and racism, it published a report containing six recommendations, relating to:

- Improved service delivery by governments;
- Support of the reconciliation by all levels of government;
- Constitutional change to acknowledge Aboriginal and Torres Strait Islander peoples as the First Peoples of Australia, and to prohibit discrimination;
- The continuation of the process of reconciliation, supported by an ongoing body called Reconciliation Australia; and
- Negotiations for a treaties or agreements (two recommendations).

== Growth of public support ==
Australians for Native Title and Reconciliation (ANTaR), a mostly non-Indigenous organisation, was founded in 1997. With support from Australian Artists Against Racism, the "Sea of Hands" was created on the lawns in front of Parliament House, Canberra: 50,000 hands, symbolising support for Indigenous Australians against the Wik amendments.

Social research showed that public support for the process of reconciliation had risen from 48% to 75–80% of the population over the decade of CAR's existence, although attitudes remained mixed on other issues, and among Indigenous people there was some scepticism that reconciliation could be of any practical value to improving their lives.

== Government response ==
Within a few years of the dissolution of CAR, the federal government was criticised for undermining the process of reconciliation by removing support structures and aiming to turn public support against reconciliation. It ignored the more controversial recommendations, such as Constitutional recognition of Indigenous Australians, recognition of Indigenous rights, and setting up structured negotiating processes, instead focusing on the practical aspects, as seen in its Closing the Gap policy framework, which commenced in 2008.

== Reconciliation Australia ==
The peak body to oversee the continuing process of reconciliation, Reconciliation Australia, was established by CAR in January 2001. It remains active, although operates without the statutory framework and resources enjoyed by CAR. It is an independent NGO, mostly funded by the federal government through the National Indigenous Australians Agency, with a large contribution from the BHP Foundation. Other funding comes from other corporate sponsors, private donors, and investments. Reconciliation Australia's vision of the concept of reconciliation is based on "five inter-related dimensions,: race relations, equality and equity, unity, institutional integrity and historical acceptance".

== National Reconciliation Week ==
Major religious communities in Australia commenced the practice of a Week of Prayer for Reconciliation in 1993, which proved very successful. In 1996 this grew into National Reconciliation Week (NRW), which provides a focus on reconciliation activities across the country. The Week occurs each year between two highly symbolic dates: 27 May, the anniversary of the 1967 referendum, and 3 June (Mabo Day), the date that the Mabo decision was made in the High Court of Australia.

National Sorry Day, on 26 May, remembers the anniversary of the day that the Bringing Them Home report was tabled in Parliament.

The first Reconciliation Day as a public holiday was held in the Australian Capital Territory on 28 May 2018.

== 21st century ==
The reconciliation process had struggled to be accepted into political discourse. The dual target of rights and practical measures were a message aimed not only at governments but also the corporate sector and all kinds of institutions, as well as ordinary members of the public. The interpretation of the concept no longer warrants to be debated, and its usefulness in making real improvements to the lives of Aboriginal and Torres Strait Islander people historically reviewed.

=== Timeline ===
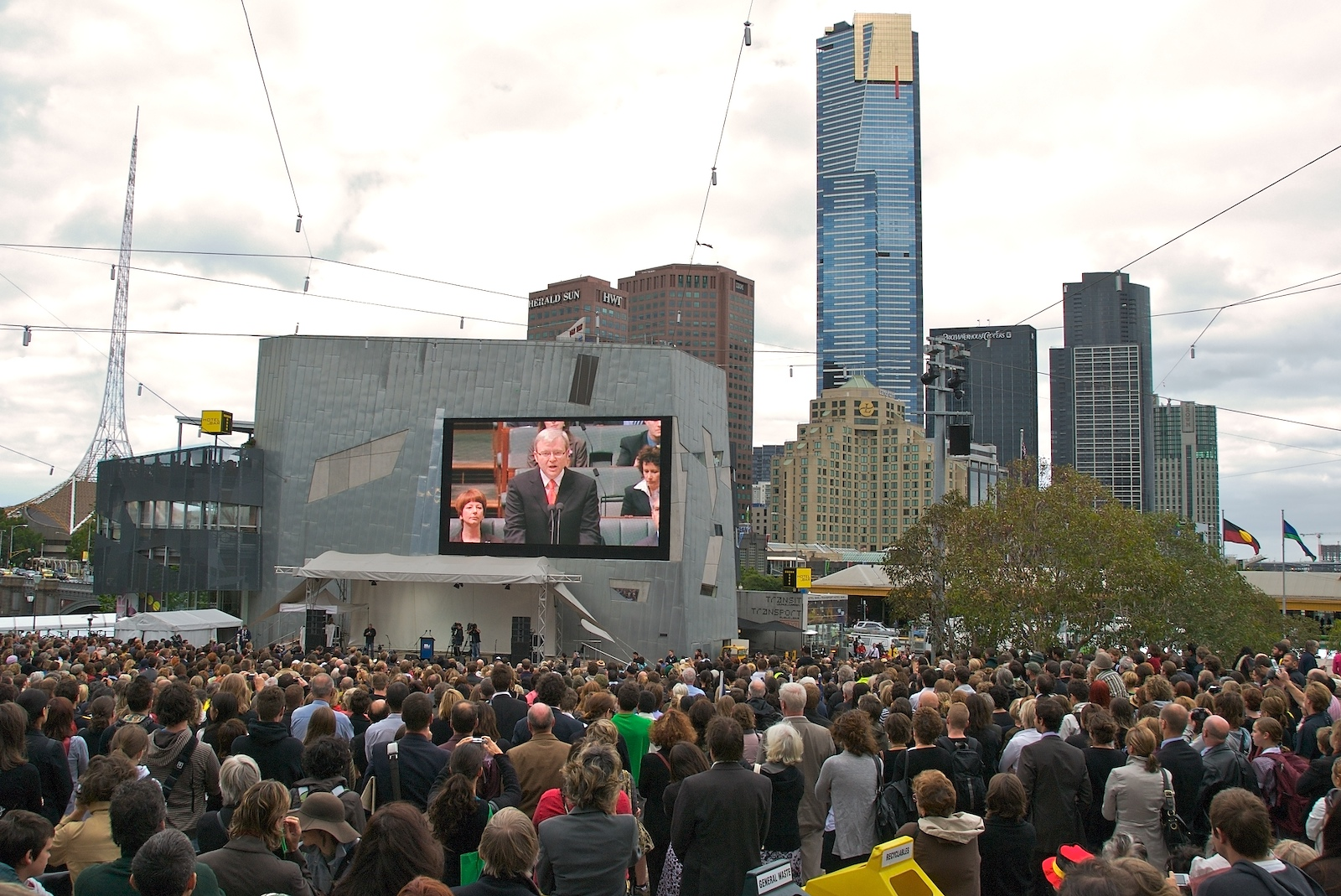
Kevin Rudd on screen in Federation Square, Melbourne, apologising to the stolen generations

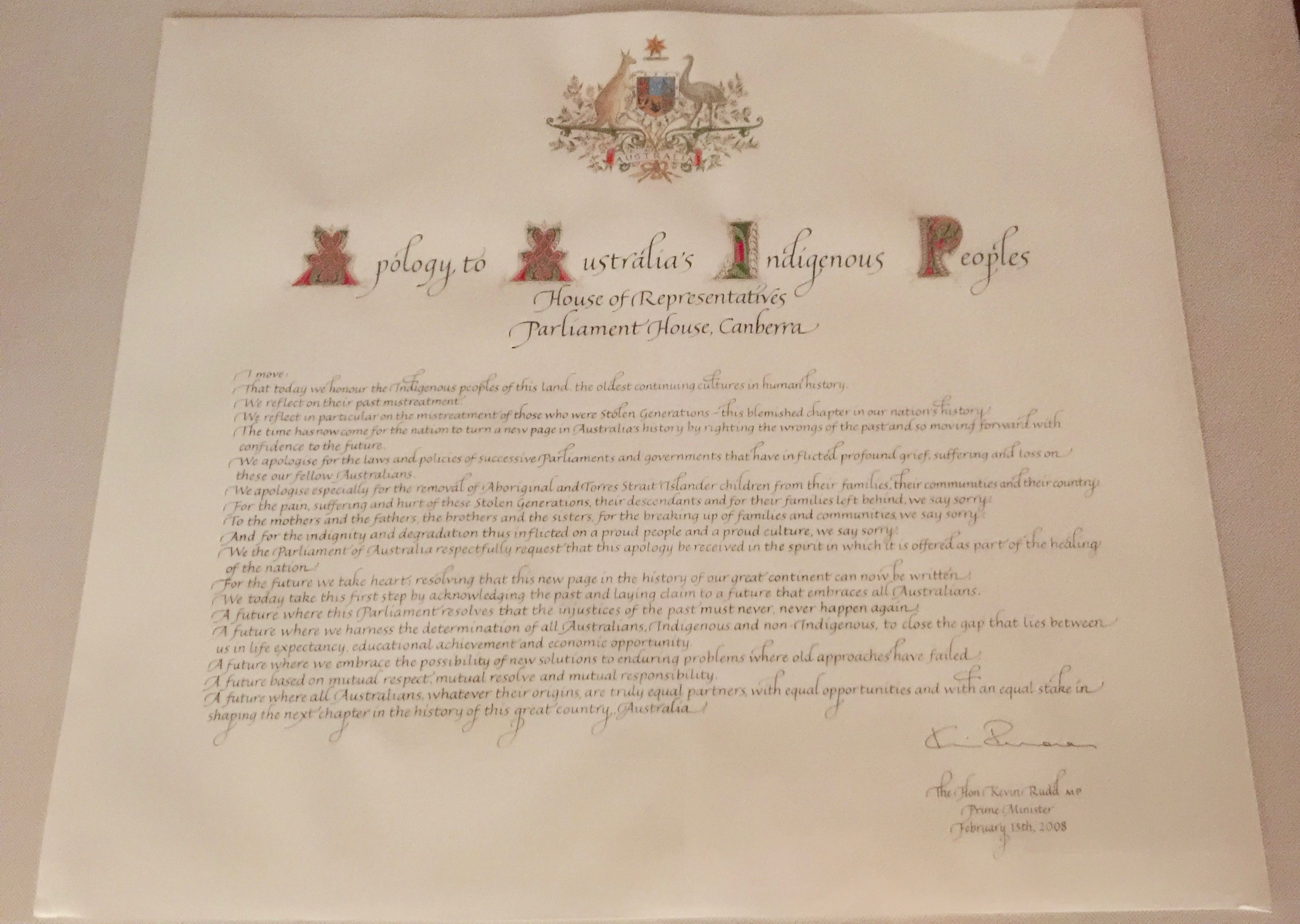
Copy of the apology speech, Parliament House, Canberra

Significant moments and initiatives have included:

- 2001: Reconciliation Australia established
- 2004: A memorial to commemorate the Stolen Generations is created by the federal government at Reconciliation Place in Canberra
- 2007: Northern Territory National Emergency Response ("The Intervention") in the Northern Territory
- 2008: The National Apology made by Prime Minister Kevin Rudd on behalf of the Australian Government to its Indigenous peoples
- 2008: Closing the Gap government strategy and funding commitment begins
- 2009: Australia recognises the United Nations Declaration on the Rights of Indigenous Peoples (passed in 2007) for the first time
- 2010: Ken Wyatt becomes the first Aboriginal person in the Australian House of Representatives
- 2010: National Congress of Australia's First Peoples is established
- 2012: Campaign for constitutional recognition officially begins
- 2013: Aboriginal and Torres Strait Islander Peoples Recognition Act 2013 is passed, recognising Australia's Indigenous peoples as the original owners of the nation
- 2015: Referendum Council established
- 2016: The governments of South Australia, Victoria and the Northern Territory announce that they will begin discussions of treaty
- 2017: Uluru Statement from the Heart, a unified statement issued after the National Constitutional Convention at Uluru, calling for an Indigenous voice to parliament; rejected by the Turnbull government
- 2018: Advancing the Treaty Process with Aboriginal Victorians Act 2018 (VIC) – the first piece of legislation relating to treaty
- 2020: Black Lives Matter protests in Australia: marches across the nation
- 2020: After destroying two ancient and significant sites at Juukan Gorge, mining company Rio Tinto is suspended from the Reconciliation Action Plan community
- 2022: Newly elected Prime Minister Anthony Albanese promises to progress the Uluru Statement. This includes holding a referendum to amend the Australian Constitution to recognise Indigenous Australians via the creation of the Indigenous Voice To Parliament.
- 2023: The referendum for a Voice to Parliament is rejected both nationally and by a majority in every state. Its failure was seen as a major setback for reconciliation and viewed by some as the death of Reconciliation altogether. Despite the referendum's failure, the Federal government has stated it remains committed to Reconciliation. A report following the referendum concluded that the results had emboldened racism towards Indigenous Australians.
- 2023: South Australia became the first jurisdiction in Australia to establish a First Nations Voice to Parliament with the passing of the First Nations Voice Act 2023.
- 2025: The Statewide Treaty Act 2025 was passed by the Victorian Parliament in October 2025 and was signed and granted royal assent on 13 November 2025. This is the first treaty between a government and First Peoples in Australia and makes the First Peoples' Assembly of Victoria a permanent voice body.

== See also ==
- Reconciliation education
