= National Reconciliation Week =

Australian observance of Indigenous cultures

- Date: 27 May to 3 June
- Frequency: Annual
- Country: Australia
- Organiser: Reconciliation Australia

National Reconciliation Week (NRW) is intended to celebrate Indigenous history and culture in Australia and foster reconciliation discussion and activities. It started as the Week of Prayer for Reconciliation in 1993, developing into National Reconciliation Week in 1996.

It is held from 27 May to 3 June each year. These dates mark the anniversary of the 1967 referendum (27 May) and the date in 1992 that the Mabo decision was made in the High Court of Australia (3 June, Mabo Day).

== History and background ==
In 1991, the Australian Parliament unanimously created the Council for Aboriginal Reconciliation (CAR) with funding until 2001.

In 1993, major religious groups in Australia established the Week of Prayer for Reconciliation. In 1996, the CAR expanded this into the first National Reconciliation Week.

In 2000, an estimated 250,000 people walked across the Sydney Harbour Bridge, and in Brisbane, the People’s Walk for Reconciliation attracted an estimated 70,000 people.

In 2001, Reconciliation Australia was established to replace the CAR, including its organisation of National Reconciliation Week.

== Description ==
National Reconciliation Week is intended to celebrate the history and culture of Aboriginal and Torres Strait Islander people in Australia, and foster reconciliation discussion and activities.

The day before the start of the week, 26 May, is National Sorry Day, first held in Sydney in 1998 and now commemorated annually to honour the Stolen Generations.

The theme of NRW 2025 is "Bridging Now to Next" reflecting the continuing connection between past, present, and future.

== Reconciliation Day ==
Reconciliation Day
- Observed by: Australian Capital Territory
- Date: First Monday after or on 27 May
- Frequency: Annual

Reconciliation Day is a public holiday in the Australian Capital Territory marking the start of National Reconciliation Week. It is held on the first Monday after or on 27 May, the anniversary of the 1967 referendum. It was held for the first time on 28 May 2018.

== See also ==
- NAIDOC Week, held annually in the same week as International Day of the World's Indigenous Peoples.
- Reconciliation in Australia
