= Reconciliation education =

Comparison of ones nature

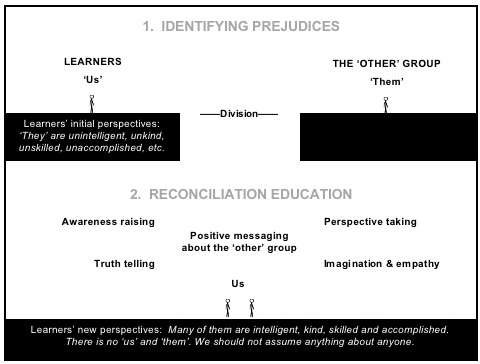
Figure 1: Reconciliation Education provides opportunity for participants to challenge prejudices and adopt more positive intergroup attitudes

Reconciliation education is a teaching-learning framework for improving participants' attitudes toward other groups of people, developed in Australia by Adam Heaton.

== Background ==
The term reconciliation relates to race relations in this context, as used in various countries around the world, including Australia.

Reconciliation education was developed by Adam Paul Heaton based on findings from his 2014 PhD study. The study found that as Australian Grade 8 students engaged in a positive discourse about Aboriginal Australians, they developed more positive attitudes toward the other group.

== Description ==
The educational framework is aimed at improving attitudes and relationships among different groups of people. The other group may possess characteristics diverse from participants' own, such as a different ethnicity, religion or political affiliation. Participants engage in awareness-raising, truth-telling, perspective-taking, imagination and empathy as they consider a positive discourse designed to counter negative and prejudiced attitudes toward the group (see Figure 1).

Points of commonality exist with allophilia and reconciliation.

== See also ==
- Reconciliation in Australia
