= Motion of Reconciliation =

Australian Parliament motion addressing historic indigenous maltreatment

The Motion of Reconciliation was a motion to the Australian Parliament introduced and passed on 26 August 1999. Drafted by Prime Minister John Howard in consultation with Aboriginal Senator Aden Ridgeway, it dedicated the Parliament to the "cause of reconciliation" and recognised historic maltreatment of Indigenous Australians as the "most blemished chapter" in Australian history. While falling short of an apology, the motion included a statement of regret for past injustices suffered by Indigenous Australians.

== Background ==
The Labor government under Bob Hawke had created the Council for Aboriginal Reconciliation (CAR) in 1991, a body which was charged with creating a strategy for all levels of government for reconciliation between Australia's Indigenous peoples and the rest of the population.

Movement towards a motion of reconciliation gained impetus with the commissioning of the Bringing Them Home report by the Labor government of Paul Keating in 1995 and tabled in parliament in 1997, which recommended that an official apology be offered by the Australian Government for past government welfare policies which the report said had separated children from parents on racial grounds and came at severe personal cost to those involved, a group it termed the "Stolen Generations".

Democrat Senator Aden Ridgeway, the only Aboriginal federal parliamentarian, said four weeks before the motion that the Coalition government under John Howard was moving towards supporting a motion on the theme of an apology to the Stolen Generations in Federal Parliament, and that there was no need for them to fear compensation claims.

In response to requests for a national apology, John Herron, then Minister for Aboriginal Affairs, had responded by saying: "the government does not support an official national apology. Such an apology could imply that present generations are in some way responsible and accountable for the actions of earlier generations; actions that were sanctioned by the laws of the time and that were believed to be in the best interests of the children concerned".

Howard's position was that there was nothing for which the current generation of Australians had nothing to say sorry for, and that an apology would acknowledge inter-generational guilt, with the wrongs of the past being judged by contemporary standards, so would not agree to including the word in the motion.

== The motion ==
On the afternoon of Thursday, 26 August 1999, Prime Minister John Howard rose to deliver the Motion as follows:

I move: That this House:

- (a) reaffirms its wholehearted commitment to the cause of reconciliation between indigenous and non-indigenous Australians as an important national priority for Australians;
- (b) recognising the achievements of the Australian nation commits to work together to strengthen the bonds that unite us, to respect and appreciate our differences and to build a fair and prosperous future in which we can all share;
- (c) reaffirms the central importance of practical measures leading to practical results that address the profound economic and social disadvantage which continues to be experienced by many indigenous Australians;
- (d) recognises the importance of understanding the shared history of indigenous and non-indigenous Australians and the need to acknowledge openly the wrongs and injustices of Australia's past;
- (e) acknowledges that the mistreatment of many indigenous Australians over a significant period represents the most blemished chapter in our international history;
- (f) expresses its deep and sincere regret that indigenous Australians suffered injustices under the practices of past generations, and for the hurt and trauma that many indigenous people continue to feel as a consequence of those practices; and
- (g) believes that we, having achieved so much as a nation, can now move forward together for the benefit of all Australians.

Response of the Opposition

After the motion was proposed by Senator Robert Hill, Senator John Faulkner proposed an amendment on behalf of the Labor Party, stating that the Parliament: "unreservedly apologises to Indigenous Australians for the injustice they have suffered, and for the hurt and trauma that many Indigenous people continue to suffer as a consequence of that injustice; and calls for the establishment of appropriate processes to provide justice and restitution to members of the Stolen Generation through consultation, conciliation and negotiation rather than requiring Indigenous Australians to engage in adversarial litigation in which they are forced to relive the pain and trauma of their past suffering". However, the amendment was not passed.

== Reaction ==
Although contemporaneously reported in international media as an "apology", the refusal to include the word "sorry" in the Parliamentary Motion of Reconciliation became a subject of considerable debate and controversy in Australia. The opposition Labor Party, Kim Beazley, said that Aboriginal children were still being removed during the lifetimes of many Australians still alive, and that Parliament needed to declare that it was sorry. Several Aboriginal leaders were highly dissatisfied with the wording of the statement.

Ridgeway later defended the motion in an interview, saying that Labor should have come on board with the discussions. He said that the vote on the motion by Parliament was an historic moment, which marked a new era in the relationship between the government and Aboriginal leaders; however, Aboriginal leaders in the community were not all supportive of the motion. Evelyn Scott, chair of the CAR, thought that the motion "in effect amounts to an apology", and was therefore very significant. Mick Dodson, co-author of the Bringing Them Home report, said that the motion did not honour the memories of "those who were the subject of those awful assimilation policies". His brother, Pat Dodson, former chair of CAR, and nine leaders of Aboriginal Land Councils in northern Australia, jointly condemned the motion.

== 2008: National Apology ==
The Government of Kevin Rudd gave a "National Apology" on 13 February 2008, without proposing a compensation or restitution process. The motion passed through Parliament with the bi-partisan support of the Liberal-National Party Opposition.
