= Reconciliation Australia =

Australian not-for-profit organisation promoting reconciliation with First Peoples

- Predecessor: Council for Aboriginal Reconciliation
- Formation: January 2001; 25 years ago
- Type: Non-government not-for-profit organisation
- Purpose: The national expert body on reconciliation in Australia; with a vision to wake to a reconciled, just and equitable Australia
- Headquarters: Old Parliament House
- Location: Parkes, Australian Capital Territory
- Region served: Australia
- Co-Chairs: Professor Tom Calma AO; Melinda Cilento
- CEO: Karen Mundine
- Revenue: ▼$10.9 million (2016)
- Website: reconciliation.org.au

Reconciliation Australia is a non-government, not-for-profit foundation established in January 2001 to promote a continuing national focus for reconciliation between Indigenous (i.e. Aboriginal and Torres Strait Islander people) and non-Indigenous Australians. It was established by the Council for Aboriginal Reconciliation, which was established to create a framework for furthering a government policy of reconciliation in Australia.

Among other functions, Reconciliation Australia organises National Reconciliation Week each year. The Australian Reconciliation Network comprises reconciliation organisations in the six states of Australia.

The organisation has ceased strategic planning as of September 2017.

== History ==
The Royal Commission into Aboriginal Deaths in Custody, which published its final report in April 1991, had recommended the initiation of a process of reconciliation between Aboriginal and non-Aboriginal Australians. On 2 September 1991, the Australian Parliament voted unanimously to establish the Council for Aboriginal Reconciliation (CAR) and a formal reconciliation process. Parliament had noted that there had been no formal process of reconciliation and that it was "most desirable that there be such a reconciliation" by the year 2001, marking the centenary of Federation. The Council for Aboriginal Reconciliation was established by Parliament, by the Council for Aboriginal Reconciliation Act 1991, to be disbanded after 10 years.

The CAR's vision statement aimed for "A united Australia which respects this land of ours; values the Aboriginal and Torres Strait Islander heritage; and provides justice and equity for all". Patrick Dodson was the first Chair of CAR.

Reconciliation Australia was established by the CAR in January 2001. The Hon Fred Chaney AO was one of the founding co-chairs, and served for nearly 15 years on the Board until his retirement in November 2014. Jackie Huggins was a co-chair for some time.

=== "Recognise" campaign ===
In 2012, Reconciliation Australia established the "Recognise" campaign, following recommendations of the Expert Panel on Recognising Aboriginal and Torres Strait Islander Peoples in the Constitution, which was presented to the federal government under Julia Gillard in January 2012. The Recognise campaign focused specifically on raising awareness among all Australians of the need to change the Constitution, ahead of a referendum. In this it was successful: awareness of the issue rose from 30% to over 75% of the population.

Tanya Hosch was deputy director and also the public face of the campaign, after addressing the National Press Club in February 2013. In May 2013, her team toured Australia aiming to inform and involve people in the bid to get Indigenous people recognised in the constitution. This included public advocacy, building support and partnerships behind the scenes, and consulting Aboriginal people in remote areas. Beginning in Melbourne and finishing at Nhulunbuy in the Northern Territory, the trail was inspired by the "Long Walk" from Melbourne to Canberra undertaken in 2004 by AFL footballer Michael Long.

The campaign ended in 2017, when the federal government ceased to fund it, by which time it had attracted the support of more than 318,000 people, and more than 160 community and corporate partner organisations.

== Governance, funding and description ==
Reconciliation Australia is funded from corporate and government partnerships as well as tax-deductible donations from individual Australians. The organisation works with business, government and individual Australians to bring about change, identifying and promoting examples of reconciliation in action. Reconciliation Australia also independently monitors Australia's progress towards reconciliation.

A significant amount of funding for Reconciliation Australia comes from the BHP Foundation, the philanthropic branch of the mining giant BHP Group Limited.

== Key people ==
=== Board ===
As of July 2021, board members of Reconciliation Australia were:

- Tom Calma (co-chair)
- Melinda Cilento (co-chair), independent director of Woodside Petroleum
- Kenny Bedford, lives on and represents the remote island of Darnley Island on the Torres Strait Regional Authority
- Bill Lawson, retired engineer and advocate for reconciliation, founder of the Beacon Foundation
- Kirstie Parker, a Yuwallarai person in NSW, and co-chair of the National Congress of Australia's First Peoples
- Joy Thomas, served as an adviser and chief of staff to Ministers in the Howard government
- Sharon Davis, Bardi and Kija person, chief executive officer at the National Aboriginal and Torres Strait Islander Corporation and co-founder of Goorlil Consulting
- Doug Ferguson, partner with KPMG

=== Executive ===
- Karen Mundine, chief executive officer, Bundjalung person with many years of experience in community engagement, public advocacy, and communications

== Recognition and awards ==
In 2019, Reconciliation Australia was the recipient of the UN Day Honour award, which recognises "individuals or organisations in Australia that have made a significant contribution to the aims and objectives of the UN, for example in promoting peace, respect for human rights, equal opportunities, social justice and environmental sustainability".

== National Reconciliation Week ==
National Reconciliation Week was organised each year by Reconciliation Australia.

== Reconciliation Action Plans ==
In 2006 Prime Minister John Howard and Professor Mick Dodson launched the Reconciliation Action Plan (RAP) program, which was to be administered by Reconciliation Australia. The initial focus was aimed at closing the gap in life expectancy between Aboriginal and Torres Strait Islander peoples and the rest of the Australian population, and took in all sectors, ages, demographics and areas across the nation, but over the following decade it evolved into a "more holistic approach to empower and support positive outcomes for Aboriginal and Torres Strait Islander people". The RAP program had been trademarked, and was administered by Reconciliation Australia, which worked collaboratively with organisations of all kinds to develop their RAPs optimistically to progress 'reconciliation' in the workplace.

RAPs consisted of practical and structured plans for action within a workplace, based on relationships, respect and opportunities. They help people in the workplace to understand important issues relating to Indigenous Australians, and further meaningful engagement among groups. They also aim to increase equality in the workplace, and help to create sustainable employment opportunities. Four types of RAPS are available, depending on the how it best suits the organisation, known as Reflect, Innovate, Stretch and Elevate. The program helps to drive change within the organisation as well as providing further opportunities to collaborate with the RAP networks such as Reconciliation Industry Network Groups.

An example of what may be in an organisation's RAP was to develop a procurement strategy that aimed to source goods and services from certified Indigenous businesses, through Supply Nation.

The RAP program grew from eight organisations in 2006 to over 900 fully endorsed RAP programs by 2017. A 2013 survey which included more than 350 Australian organisations that then had a RAP found that 71% of workers in these organisations trusted each other, compared with 13% in the wider population. Around 77% of the RAP-organisation employees pride in Indigenous cultures, compared to 51% of the wider population. Co-chair Tom Calma said that said RAPs were changing workplace culture and attitudes, and were providing a basis for significant economic and social improvements.

As examples of large corporations with RAPs, KPMG put its first one into place in 2017 and is as of 2021 working off its second one, on the "Elevate" model; while BORAL adopted their first plan in 2019, on the "Innovate" model. Griffith University in Queensland adopted its first RAP in 2010.

== Australian Reconciliation Network ==
The Australian Reconciliation Network included the following independently-run organisations, which organised activities and provided information:

- New South Wales – Reconciliation NSW (formerly NSW Reconciliation Council)
- Queensland – Reconciliation Queensland
- South Australia – Reconciliation SA
- Tasmania – Reconciliation Tasmania
- Victoria – Reconciliation Victoria
- Western Australia – Reconciliation WA

== See also ==
- National Sorry Day
