= Indigenous Land and Sea Corporation =

Australian government statutory authority

Statutory authority overview
- Formed: 1 June 1995; 31 years ago
- Jurisdiction: Australia
- Headquarters: Adelaide, South Australia
- Employees: 274 (as at 30 June 2015)
- Annual budget: A$118 million (2015)
- Minister responsible: Malarndirri McCarthy, Minister for Indigenous Australians
- Statutory authority executives: Joe Morrison, CEO; Tricia Stroud, Chief Operating Officer
- Parent department: Department of the Prime Minister and Cabinet
- Child agencies: Voyages Indigenous Tourism Australia; National Indigenous Pastoral Enterprises; National Centre of Indigenous Excellence
- Key documents: Land Fund and Indigenous Land Corporation (ATSIC Amendment) Act 1995 (Cth); Aboriginal and Torres Strait Islander Act 2005 (Cth) s 191
- Website: www.ilsc.gov.au

The Indigenous Land and Sea Corporation (ILSC) is an Australian federal government statutory authority with national responsibilities to assist Aboriginal and Torres Strait Islander people to acquire land and to manage assets to achieve cultural, social, environmental and economic benefits for Indigenous peoples and future generations. It was established as the Indigenous Land Corporation (ILC) following the enactment of the Native Title Act 1993.

The Corporation owns several subsidiary businesses, including Voyages Indigenous Tourism Australia, National Indigenous Pastoral Enterprises (NIPE), and the National Centre of Indigenous Excellence.

== History ==
The Indigenous Land Corporation was established under the Land Fund and Indigenous Land Corporation (ATSIC Amendment) Act 1995. in 1993–4, following the passing of the Native Title Act 1993.

In 2008 the ILC rolled out its Training to Employment (T2E) program, which was renamed "Our Land Our Jobs" in 2015.

In 2015 Tricia Button became the first Aboriginal woman to be Deputy CEO of the organisation; later known as Tricia Stroud, she was Chief Operating Officer as of 2021.

On 1 February 2019 the name of the Indigenous Land Corporation was changed to Indigenous Land and Sea Corporation, with its remit extended to cover waters as well as land. In that year it created the Agribusiness Investment Program, to provide funding for Indigenous agricultural enterprises.

== Governance ==
The ILSC has a seven-member board, appointed by the Minister for Indigenous Affairs. The Chairperson and at least four other members of the Board must be Indigenous. The ILSC Board makes all policy and land acquisition decisions. The ILC was formed following the Mabo decision, which first recognised native title in Australia and the prior ownership of land by Indigenous people, rejecting the doctrine of terra nullius.

As of October 2021, Joe Morrison is CEO and Tricia Stroud is Chief Operating Officer.

== Funding and legislation ==
The ILSC was established pursuant to the Land Fund and Indigenous Land Corporation (ATSIC Amendment) Act 1995. that allocated an indexed sum of A$121 million from the Australian Government to the ILC over a period of ten years to 30 June 2004. Since June 2004, the ILSC has been self-sufficient. In the preceding ten years, one third of allocations could be allotted towards funding ongoing activities.

The ILSC is now regulated by the Aboriginal and Torres Strait Islander Act 2005.

== Subsidiaries ==
The ILSC has acquired a number of assets, some of which are run as stand-alone subsidiary businesses, including Voyages Indigenous Tourism Australia (known as Voyages), National Indigenous Pastoral Enterprises (NIPE), and the National Centre of Indigenous Excellence (NCIE).

=== NCIE ===
The NCIE was established in 2006 and is located in Redfern in Sydney. It was partly in response to the 2004 Redfern riots, with the intention of improving the long-term well-being of the Redfern community. It was created on the site of the Redfern Public School after it was acquired by the ILSC.

As of 2012, Jason Glanville was the Chief Executive Officer of NCIE. In 2015, Kirstie Parker was appointed CEO. As of October 2021 Darren Hammond was CEO. It offers sports, fitness, conferences and community classes which include educational support for Aboriginal and Torres Strait Islander people. The centre is also home to several diversion and youth programs which are run in collaboration with local police. In mid-2022 there were around 50 employees, mostly Indigenous. Other users of the gym and sporting facilities include NRL players from the Rabbitohs, the governor-general, and members of the air force. The centre provides after-school care, programs for jobseekers, a variety of classes in health and cultural topics, and swimming lessons for all ages.

In early August 2022 it was announced that the NCIE would be closed from 8 August 2022, after the ILSC and new owners of the site since 30 June, the New South Wales Aboriginal Land Council (NSWALC), could not agree on ongoing support for the centre. However, after staff and community members had protested for five days, Linda Burney, the federal Minister for Indigenous Australians, and Environment Minister Tanya Plibersek intervened.Burney said that the centre must stay open, and that the ILSC and NSWALC had a week to come to an agreement. Although the centre had accumulated a large debt, but the first social return on investment (SROI) report found that NCIE created three times the value for members of the community, dollar for dollar.

=== Voyages ===
Following its 2010 acquisition by the ILC, Voyages established the National Indigenous Training Academy at Yulara, Northern Territory (Ayers Rock Resort) to provide young Indigenous people with accredited training in hospitality, and the resort significantly increased its level of Indigenous staff from 1 per cent of the workforce at time of acquisition to approximately 32 per cent of the workforce in 2015.

=== NIPE ===
The National Indigenous Pastoral Enterprises was established in 2014, and a year later became a fully-functioning subsidiary, with 246 Aboriginal employees, which was about 72 per cent of the workforce.

== See also ==
- Aboriginal Australians
- Aboriginal land rights in Australia
- List of laws concerning Indigenous Australians
- Native title legislation in Australia
