= Mick Dodson =

Aboriginal Australian barrister, academic and Indigenous rights advocate

Mick Dodson AM FASSA
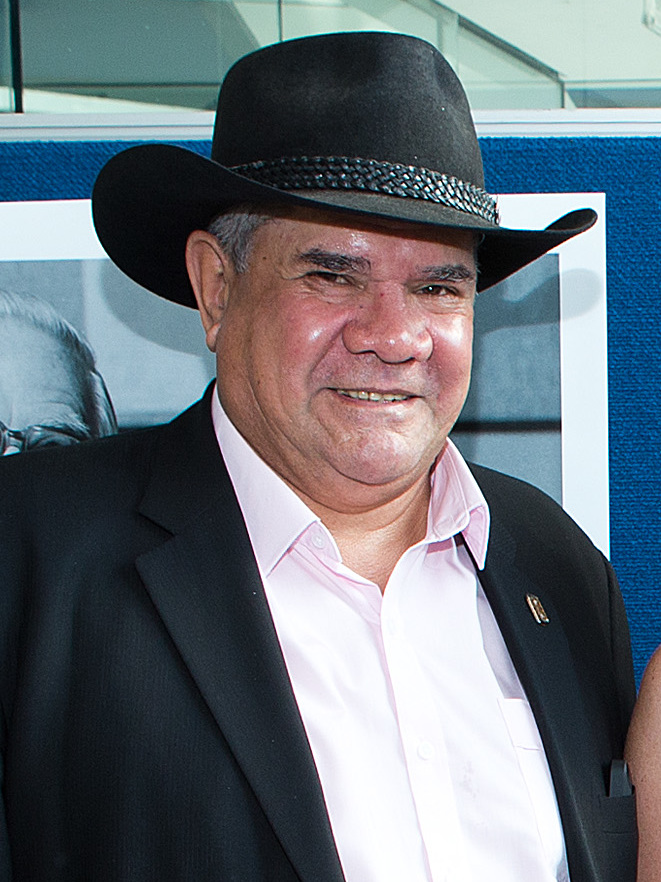
- Dodson in 2014
- Born: Michael James Dodson; Katherine, Northern Territory, Australia
- Education: Monivae College; Monash University
- Occupations: Barrister; academic
- Known for: First Indigenous person to graduate from law in Australia; Prominent member of the Yawuru peoples in the Broome area of the southern Kimberley region of Western Australia; Member of the United Nations Permanent Forum on Indigenous Issues
- Title: Co-chair of Reconciliation Australia
- Term: 2006–2011
- Predecessor: Jackie Huggins
- Successor: Tom Calma
- Relatives: Pat Dodson (brother)

Michael James Dodson AM, FASSA is an Aboriginal Australian barrister and academic. He was Australia's first Aboriginal and Torres Strait Islander Social Justice Commissioner with the Human Rights and Equal Opportunity Commission. His brother is Pat Dodson, also a noted Aboriginal leader and from 2016 to 2024 a senator in the Federal Parliament, representing Western Australia.

== Early life and education ==
Michael James Dodson was born in Katherine, Northern Territory, Australia. He is a member of the Yawuru people in the Broome area of the southern Kimberley region of Western Australia.

Following his parents' death, he boarded at Monivae College, Hamilton, Victoria. He graduated with degrees in jurisprudence and law from Monash University in 1974, as the first Indigenous person to graduate from law in Australia.

== Career ==
Following graduation, Dodson worked as a solicitor for the Victorian Aboriginal Legal Service from 1976 until around 1980. He was admitted to the Victorian Bar in 1981, and commenced work as a barrister.

In 1988, he was appointed as Counsel assisting the Royal Commission into Aboriginal Deaths in Custody, remaining in that role until 1990.

Dodson was also a commissioner of the Bringing Them Home report (1997) in which he and Ronald Wilson took primary responsibility for conducting the hearings of the inquiry and was a key author of the report. They took 585 stories and testimonies from Aboriginal and Torres Strait Islander people about their experiences of separation, institutionalisation and abuse suffered and Dodson sought for those affected to receive both an apology and compensation from the government. A 1997 speech by Dodson, after the release of the report, 'We all bear the cost if the apology is not paid' in which he demanded an Apology to Australia's Indigenous peoples (which ultimately took place in 2007) is included within the Anthology of Australian Aboriginal Literature (2008) signalling its significance.

He has worked extensively as a legal adviser in native title and human rights.

=== Academia ===
Dodson has lectured as a visiting academic at the University of Arizona and Harvard University. He was Professor of Law at the Australian National University and director of its National Centre for Indigenous Studies until his retirement in March 2018.

== Other roles and activities ==
Dodson has been active in politics of Australian government, justice, and crime prevention. He has been a prominent advocate of land rights and other issues affecting Indigenous Australians.

His efforts for the rights of indigenous people around the world in 2005 made him a member of United Nations Permanent Forum on Indigenous Issues.

In 2015, he was the Chief Investigator for the Serving Our Country: a history of Aboriginal and Torres Strait Islander people in the defence of Australia project, an Australian Research Council-funded research project based at The Australian National University.

In 2021, it was alleged that Dodson verbally abused a woman at an NTFL game. The incident was investigated by the NT Government but the outcome was not disclosed.

On 10 October 2023, Dodson was one of 25 Australians of the Year who signed an open letter supporting the Yes vote in the Indigenous Voice referendum, initiated by psychiatrist Patrick McGorry.

== Honours ==
- Australian Living Treasure, 1997
- Distinguished Alumni Award, Monash University, 1998
- Member of the Order of Australia (AM), 2003
- Member of the Order of Indonesia (PM), awarded on New Year's Day 2003
- Australian of the Year
- Chairperson of the Australian Institute of Aboriginal and Torres Strait Islander Studies
- Fellow, Academy of the Social Sciences in Australia, 2009

== Honorary doctorates ==
- Honorary Doctor of Letters, University of Technology Sydney, 1998
- Honorary Doctor of Laws, University of New South Wales, 1999
- Honorary Doctorate, University of Canberra, 2010
