= Apology to Australia's Indigenous peoples =

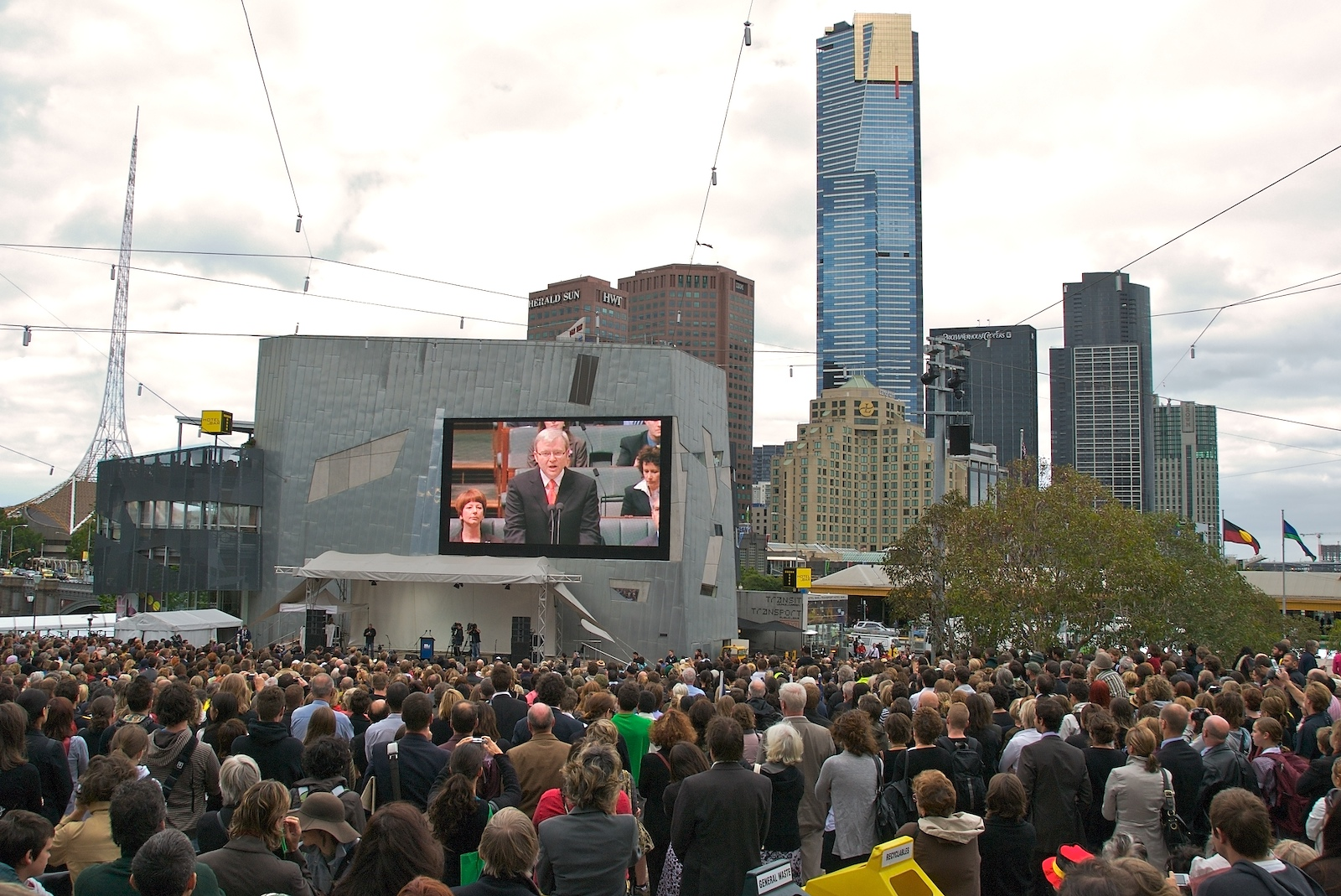
Kevin Rudd (on a big screen in Federation Square, Melbourne) apologising to the Stolen Generations

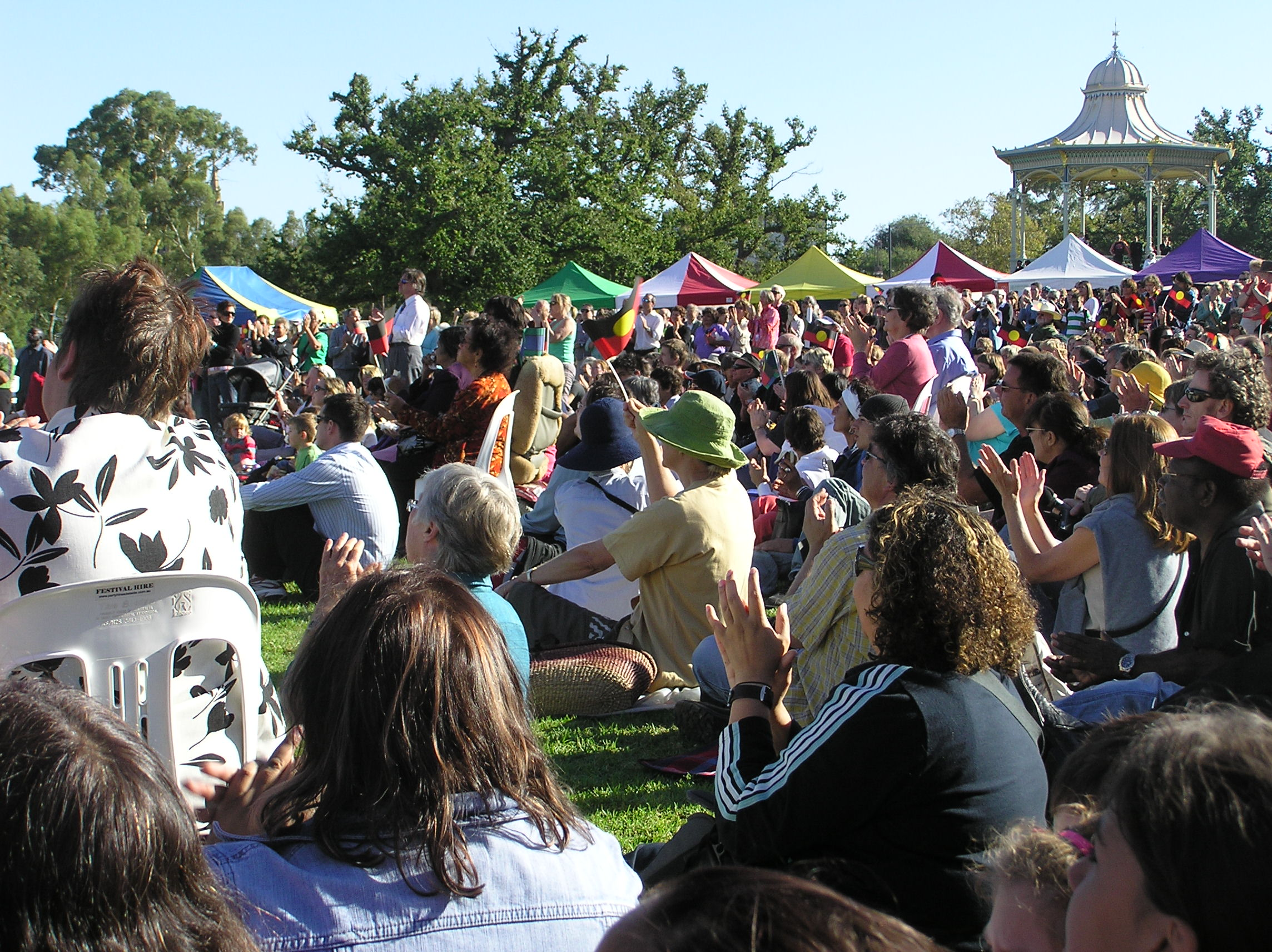
Crowds viewing a public broadcast of the federal parliament's apology in Elder Park, Adelaide

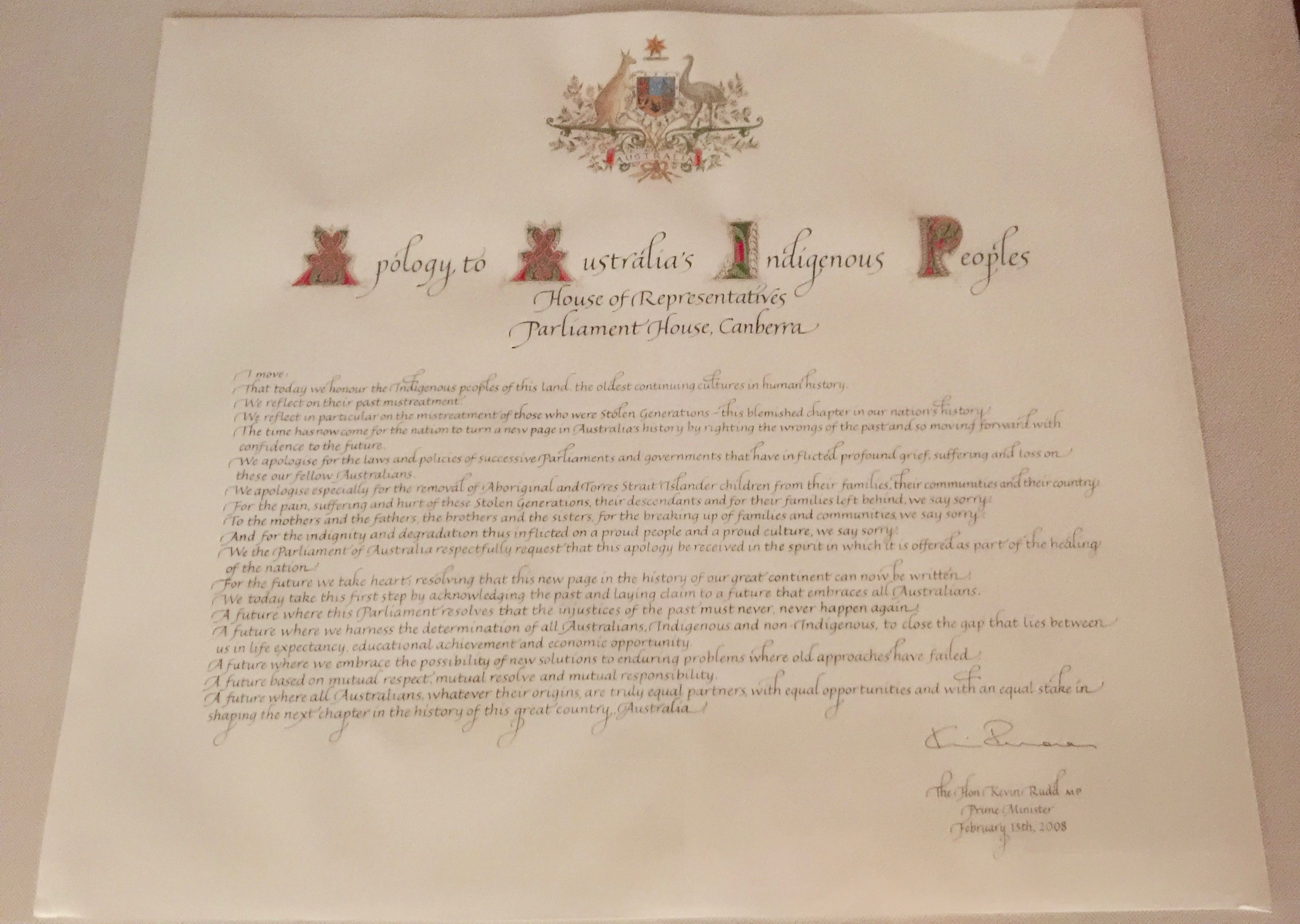
Copy of the apology speech, Parliament House, Canberra

On 13 February 2008, the Parliament of Australia issued a formal apology to Indigenous Australians for forced removals of Australian Indigenous children (often referred to as the Stolen Generations) from their families by Australian federal and state government agencies. The apology was delivered by Prime Minister Kevin Rudd, and is also referred to as the National Apology, or simply The Apology.

== Background ==
=== Howard government ===
The Bringing Them Home (1997) report commissioned by the Keating Labor Government recommended an official apology be offered by the Australian Government for past government welfare policies which had separated children from their parents on racial grounds. Keating's Liberal successor John Howard received the report, but eschewed use of the term "sorry", believing a Parliamentary "apology" would imply "intergenerational guilt". He instead moved to draft a Parliamentary "Motion of Reconciliation", in consultation with Democrat Senator Aden Ridgeway, the only Aboriginal person then sitting in the federal parliament.

On 26 August 1999, Howard moved the Motion of Reconciliation expressing "deep and sincere regret that indigenous Australians suffered injustices under the practices of past generations, and for the hurt and trauma that many indigenous people continue to feel as a consequence of those practices" and dedicating Parliament to the "cause of reconciliation" for historic mistreatment of Indigenous Australians as the "most blemished chapter" in Australian history.

From the outset, the Labor opposition, led by Kim Beazley, argued the need for an "apology". Following Howard's Motion of Reconciliation, Beazley moved to replace the motion of regret with an unreserved apology, but was unsuccessful. The Liberal-National Howard government maintained its opposition to an "apology" for the remainder of its term in office (1996-2007).

=== Rudd government ===
After the 2007 election of the Rudd government, Labor Prime Minister Kevin Rudd announced on 11 December 2007 that the government would make an apology to Indigenous Australians, the wording of which would be decided in consultation with Aboriginal leaders.

The Liberal Party opposition was split on the issue. Its leader, Brendan Nelson, initially said that an apology would risk encouraging a "culture of guilt" in Australia. However, support for an apology was expressed by other senior Liberals, such as Malcolm Turnbull, Peter Costello, Bill Heffernan, and former Liberal Prime Minister Malcolm Fraser. Former Liberal minister Judi Moylan said: "I think as a nation we owe an apology. We shouldn't be thinking about it as an individual apology — it's an apology that is coming from the nation state because it was governments that did these things". Nelson later said that he supported the government apology. Following a party meeting, the Liberal Party as a whole expressed its support for an apology, and it achieved bipartisan consensus. Nelson stated, "I, on behalf of the Coalition, of the alternative government of Australia, are [sic] providing in-principle support for the offer of an apology to the forcibly removed generations of Aboriginal children".

Lyn Austin, chairwoman of Stolen Generations Victoria, expressed why she believed an apology was necessary, recounting her experiences as a stolen child:

I thought I was being taken just for a few days. I can recall seeing my mother standing on the side of the road with her head in her hands, crying, and me in the black FJ Holden wondering why she was so upset. A few hundred words can't fix this all but it's an important start and it's a beginning[...] I see myself as that little girl, crying myself to sleep at night, crying and wishing I could go home to my family. Everything's gone, the loss of your culture, the loss of your family, all these things have a big impact.

== Details ==
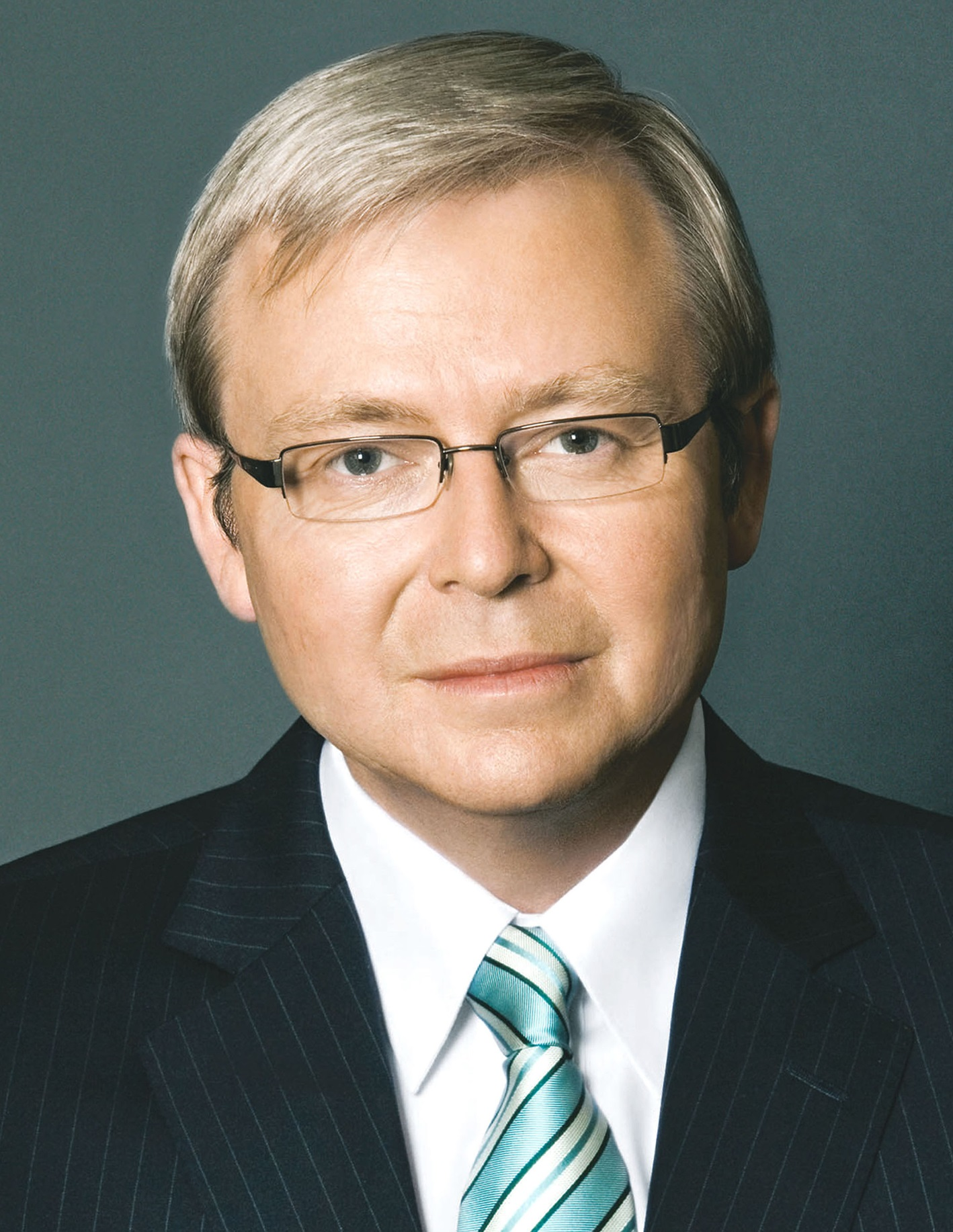
Prime Minister Kevin Rudd offered the apology on behalf of the nation.

On 13 February 2008, Rudd presented the apology to Indigenous Australians as a motion to be voted on by the house. It has since been referred to as the National Apology, or simply The Apology.

The apology read as follows:

I move:

That today we honour the Indigenous peoples of this land, the oldest continuing cultures in human history.
We reflect on their past mistreatment.
We reflect in particular on the mistreatment of those who were Stolen Generations—this blemished chapter in our nation's history.
The time has now come for the nation to turn a new page in Australia's history by righting the wrongs of the past and so moving forward with confidence to the future.
We apologise for the laws and policies of successive Parliaments and governments that have inflicted profound grief, suffering and loss on these our fellow Australians.
We apologise especially for the removal of Aboriginal and Torres Strait Islander children from their families, their communities and their country.
For the pain, suffering, and hurt of these Stolen Generations, their descendants and for their families left behind, we say sorry.
To the mothers and the fathers, the brothers and the sisters, for the breaking up of families and communities, we say sorry.
And for the indignity and degradation thus inflicted on a proud people and a proud culture, we say sorry.
We the Parliament of Australia respectfully request that this apology be received in the spirit in which it is offered as part of the healing of the nation.
For the future we take heart; resolving that this new page in the history of our great continent can now be written.
We today take this first step by acknowledging the past and laying claim to a future that embraces all Australians.
A future where this Parliament resolves that the injustices of the past must never, never happen again.
A future where we harness the determination of all Australians, Indigenous and non-Indigenous, to close the gap that lies between us in life expectancy, educational achievement, and economic opportunity.
A future where we embrace the possibility of new solutions to enduring problems where old approaches have failed.
A future based on mutual respect, mutual resolve and mutual responsibility.

A future where all Australians, whatever their origins, are truly equal partners, with equal opportunities and with an equal stake in shaping the next chapter in the history of this great country, Australia.

— Kevin Rudd, Prime Minister of Australia, 13 February 2008, at a sitting of the Parliament of Australia.

The text of the apology did not refer to compensation to Aboriginal people as a whole, nor to members of the Stolen Generations specifically. Rudd followed the apology with a 20-minute speech to the house about the need for this action.

== Opposition leader's reply ==
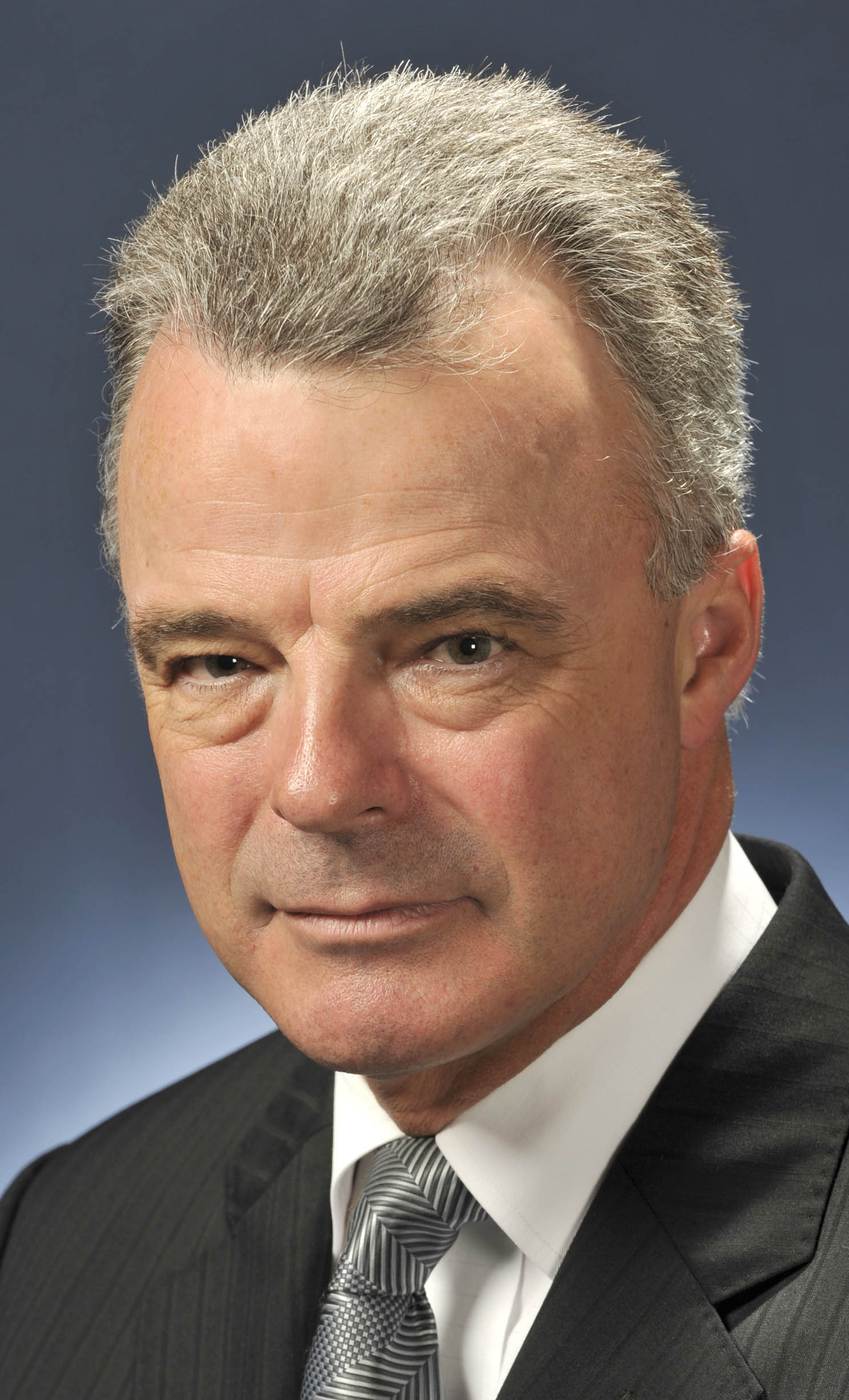
Opposition Leader Brendan Nelson offered bipartisan support for the apology.

Liberal Opposition Leader Brendan Nelson rose to offer bipartisan support for the apology:

In rising to speak strongly in support of this motion I recognise the Ngunnawal, first peoples of this Canberra land. Today our nation crosses a threshold. We formally offer an apology. We say sorry to those Aboriginal people forcibly removed from their families through the first seven decades of the 20th century. In doing so, we reach from within ourselves to our past, those whose lives connect us to it, and in deep understanding of its importance to our future. We will be at our best today and every day if we pause to place ourselves in the shoes of others, imbued with the imaginative capacity to see this issue through their eyes with decency and respect.

— Brendon Nelson, Parliamentary Hansard, 13 Feb 2008

Nelson's speech also expressed empathy for how the often "good intentions" of the public servants who carried out the removal of children had led to unintended consequences.

It is reasonably argued that removal from squalor led to better lives: children fed, housed and educated for an adult world which they could not have imagined. However, from my life as a family doctor and knowing the impact of my own father's removal from his unmarried, teenage mother, I know that not knowing who you are is the source of deep, scarring sorrows, the real meaning of which can be known only to those who have endured it [...] Our generation does not own these actions, nor should it feel guilt for what was done in many, but certainly not all, cases with the best of intentions. But in saying we are sorry, and deeply so, we remind ourselves that each generation lives in ignorance of the long-term consequences of its decisions and actions. Even when motivated by inherent humanity and decency to reach out to the dispossessed in extreme adversity, our actions can have unintended outcomes. As such, many decent Australians are hurt by accusations of theft in relation to their good intentions.

— Brendon Nelson, Parliamentary Hansard, 13 Feb 2008

His speech also referred to the "under-policing" of child welfare in Aboriginal communities, as well as a host of social ills blighting the lives of Aboriginal people.

The Alice Springs Crown Prosecutor Nanette Rogers with great courage revealed to the nation in 2006 the case of a four-year-old girl drowned while being raped by a teenager who had been sniffing petrol. She told us of the two children – one a baby – sexually assaulted by two men while their mothers were off drinking alcohol. Another baby was stabbed by a man trying to kill her mother.

After the ceremony, the House of Representatives unanimously adopted the proposed apology motion. Six members of Nelson's opposition caucus—Don Randall, Sophie Mirabella, Dennis Jensen, Wilson Tuckey, Luke Simpkins, and Alby Schultz—left the House in protest at the apology. Peter Dutton was the only Opposition front bencher to abstain from the apology. Dutton apologised for boycotting the apology in 2023, after becoming opposition leader.

=== Reaction ===
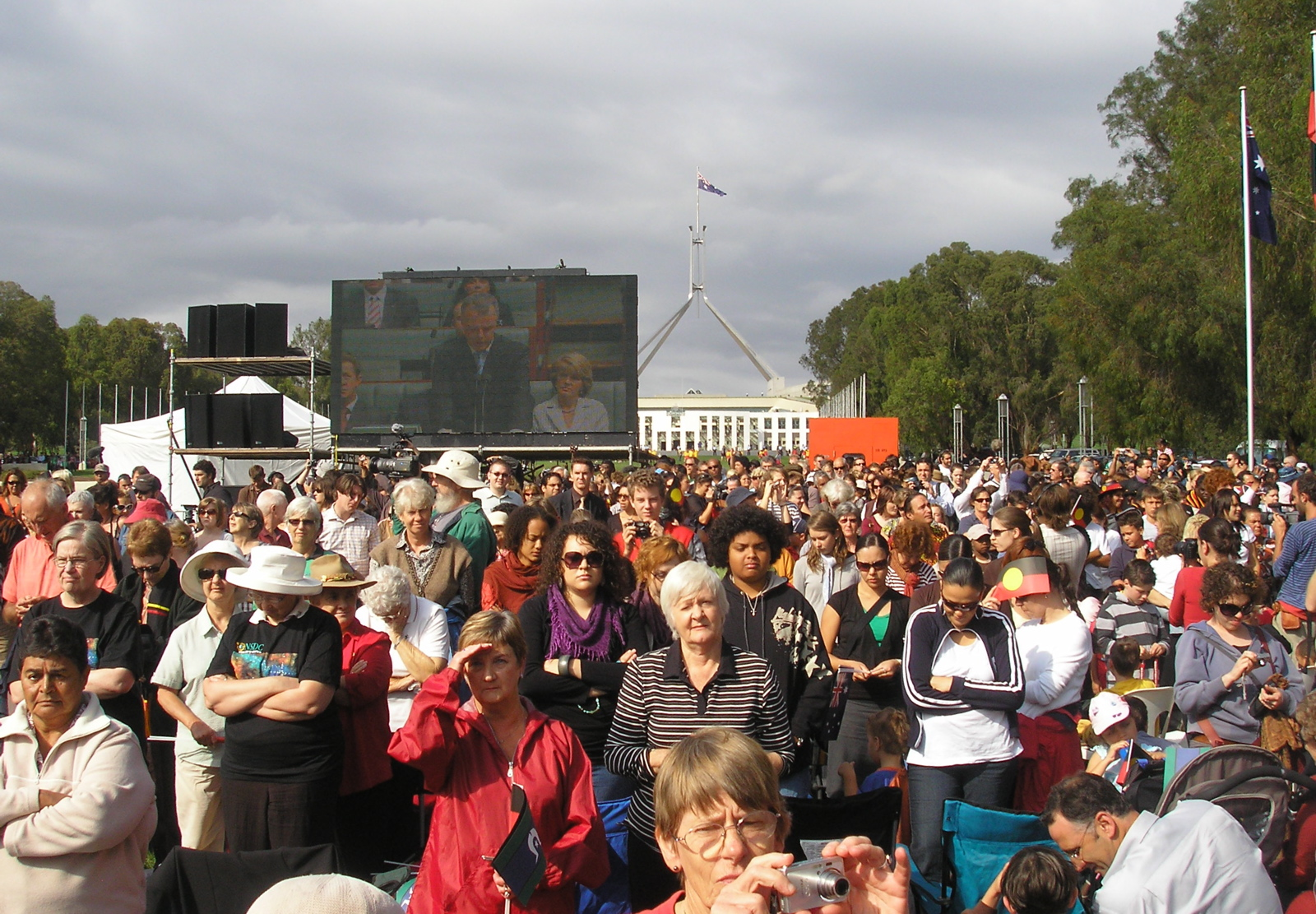
A crowd in Canberra turn their backs part way through Brendan Nelson's apology reply.

The conclusion of Nelson's speech was met with applause from Members and the public gallery and further bipartisan scenes as the Prime Minister and Leader of the Opposition met with representatives of Australia's Indigenous peoples in the distinguished visitors gallery. Former prime ministers Gough Whitlam, Malcolm Fraser and Paul Keating all expressed appreciation for Nelson's role. Whitlam called the speech "very good" and Keating said Nelson "picked up the spirit of the day".

However, outside the chamber, reactions were less bipartisan and Nelson's speech received mixed reactions and some criticism. In the Great Hall of Parliament, members of the audience (including Kevin Rudd's Press Secretary and Media Advisor) began a slow clap and turned their backs during Nelson's speech (Rudd later instructed his advisors to apologise to Nelson). In Melbourne's Federation Square, Labor's Barry Jones joined others in turning their backs. In Perth, people booed and jeered until the screen was switched off. There were similar reactions and walk-outs in Sydney and elsewhere. Academic Lowitja O'Donoghue objected to Nelson's discussion of domestic violence and paedophilia, and said "I think Brendan Nelson actually spoilt it today", and Olympian (and future Labor Senator) Nova Peris also expressed disappointment.

== Reception and response ==
The government's apology and his speech were widely applauded among both Indigenous Australians and the non-indigenous general public. A Newspoll released the week after the apology found 69% of the country supported it. However, the poll also found that only 30% of the population supported government compensation to the victims. This represented a significant shift in public opinion since 2000, with one poll finding 57% of Australians against an apology.

Tom Calma, Aboriginal and Torres Strait Islander Social Justice Commissioner of the Australian Human Rights and Equal Opportunity Commission, gave a speech formally responding to the government's apology. Calma thanked the Parliament for acknowledging and paying respects to the Stolen Generations, stating that "By acknowledging and paying respect, Parliament has now laid the foundations for healing to take place and for a reconciled Australia in which everyone belongs". However, Calma did note that there were many recommendations in the Bringing Them Home report that (as of 2009) had not yet been implemented.

Professor Alice MacLachlan has criticized this apology of the Australian government as it has apologised for a specific policy, "avoiding the broader question of apologizing for a much longer history of genocidal appropriation and displacement".

== Senate consideration ==
Later that day, the Senate considered a motion for an identical apology. The Leader of the Greens, Senator Bob Brown, attempted to amend the motion to have it include words committing parliament to offering compensation to those who suffered loss under past indigenous policies, but was opposed by all the other parties. The original motion was passed unanimously.

== Anniversary events ==
In 2009, an annual anniversary event was established by Stolen Generations survivor Michael McLeod, to acknowledge the significance of Rudd's apology as well as ongoing challenges faced by survivors of the removals. As of 2026 McLeod continues to organise the event each year.

On the 18th anniversary of the Apology in February 2026, a gathering for survivors of the Stolen Generations was attended by 130 people. Prime Minister Anthony Albanese addressed the attendees, mentioning the ongoing legacy of the Apology, as well as the need to understand the past. Minister for Indigenous Australians Malarndirri McCarthy announced funding of $87 million over four years to support survivors, to help with tracing and reunifying families; improving understanding of survivors' trauma in health and aged care services; and to improve access to survivors' records and redress.

== In film ==
Eualeyai/Kamillaroi writer and academic Larissa Behrendt (along with Michaela Perske as writer and producer) made the documentary film After the Apology, which had its world première on 9 October 2017 at the Adelaide Film Festival. The film focuses on a group of grandmothers (Grandmothers Against Removals) taking on the system over the increase in Indigenous child removal in the years following the apology. It won Best Direction of a Documentary Feature Film from the Australian Directors Guild in 2018 and was nominated in three categories in the 2018 AACTA Awards.

== See also ==
- National Sorry Day
- Reconciliation in Australia
- Redfern Park speech
