= Mabo Day =

Anniversary of significant Indigenous land rights court decision in Australia

Mabo Day is a commemorative day that occurs annually on 3 June. It is an official holiday in the Torres Shire, and occurs during National Reconciliation Week in Australia.

The date is the anniversary of the Mabo v Queensland (No 2) decision by the High Court of Australia, which recognised the pre-colonial land interests of Aboriginal and Torres Strait Islander peoples within Australia's common law. It commemorates Eddie Koiki Mabo (c. 29 June 1936–21 January 1992), a Torres Strait Islander man whose campaign for Indigenous land rights in Australia led to the court's decision, which overturned the legal fiction of terra nullius that had characterised Australian law with regard to land and title since the voyage of James Cook in 1770.

In 2002, on the tenth anniversary of the High Court decision, Mabo's widow, Bonita Mabo, called for a national public holiday on 3 June. On the eleventh anniversary, in 2003, the Aboriginal and Torres Strait Islander Commission (ATSIC) launched a petition to make 3 June an Australian Public Holiday. Eddie Mabo Jnr, for the Mabo family, said:

We believe that a public holiday would be fitting to honour and recognise the contribution to the High Court decision of not only my father and his co-plaintiffs, James Rice, Father Dave Passi, Sam Passi and Celuia Salee, but also to acknowledge all Indigenous Australians who have empowered and inspired each other.

To date we have not had a public holiday that acknowledges Indigenous people and which recognises our contribution, achievements and survival in Australia.

A public holiday would be a celebration all Australians can share in with pride – a celebration of truth that unites Indigenous and non-Indigenous Australians and a celebration of justice that overturned the legal myth of terra nullius - Mabo symbolises truth and justice and is a cornerstone of Reconciliation.

In 2010 a campaign was launched to make it a national holiday in Australia.
