= Bringing Them Home =

1997 Australian government report on the forced separation of indigenous families

- Cover of the Bringing Them Home report
- Also known as: Stolen Generation
- Outcome: Bringing Them Home report (1997): Parliamentary apologies from: Qld (26 May 1999); WA (27 May 1997); SA (28 May 1997); ACT (17 June 1997); NSW (18 June 1997); Tas (13 August 1997); Vic (17 September 1997); NT (24 October 2001); Australia (13 February 2008); Australian Government Motion of Reconciliation (26 August 1999)
- Inquiries: National Inquiry into the Separation of Aboriginal and Torres Strait Islander Children from Their Families
- Commissioners: Sir Ronald Wilson; Mick Dodson
- Inquiry period: 11 May 1995 – 26 May 1997

Bringing Them Home is the informal name of the 1997 Australian government document officially titled The Report of the National Inquiry into the Separation of Aboriginal and Torres Strait Islander Children from Their Families. The report marked a pivotal moment in the controversy that has come to be known as the Stolen Generations.

The inquiry was established by the federal Attorney-General, Michael Lavarch, on 11 May 1995, in response to efforts made by key Indigenous agencies and communities concerned that the general public's ignorance of the history of forcible removal was hindering the recognition of the needs of its victims and their families and the provision of services. The 680-page report was tabled in Federal Parliament on 26 May 1997.

== Background ==
Aboriginal organisations pushed for a national inquiry as early as 1990. The Secretariat of National Aboriginal and Islander Child Care (SNAICC) resolved at its national conference in 1992 to demand a national inquiry. Other state Aboriginal organisations were also active during this period.

In 1992 then Prime Minister Paul Keating made his famous Redfern Park Speech in Redfern, Sydney, in which for the first time, acknowledgement was made that children were taken away from their mothers.

In 1994, the Aboriginal Legal Service of Western Australia began soliciting statements from Aboriginal people who had been removed from their families as children or who were parents of removed children. The service interviewed over 600 people during this time and produced a report titled Telling our Story.

== Commissioners ==
The inquiry was primarily conducted by Sir Ronald Wilson, President of the Human Rights and Equal Opportunity Commission, and Mick Dodson, the Aboriginal and Torres Strait Islander Social Justice Commissioner.

Indigenous women, appointed as co-commissioners, provided support to the people who gave evidence in each region the inquiry visited. The co-commissioners were: Annette Peardon, Marjorie Thorpe, Maryanne Bin Salik, Sadie Canning, Olive Knight, Kathy Mills, Anne Louis, Laurel Williams, Jackie Huggins, Josephine Ptero-David and Marcia Langton. The co-commissioners also assisted in the development of the report and its recommendations.

The inquiry also appointed an Indigenous Advisory Council made up of members from all the major regions of Australia. Members of the council were: Annette Peardon, Brian Butler, Yami Lester, Irene Stainton, Floyd Chermside, Barbara Cummings, Grant Dradge, Carol Kendall, Lola McNaughton, Isabel Coe, Peter Rotimah, Nigel D'Souza, Maureen Abbott, Margaret Ah Kee, Bill Lowah, Matilda House, and Jim Wright.

== Hearings and submissions ==
The inquiry undertook an extensive programme of hearings in every capital city and in many regional and smaller centres.

New South Wales	Redfern, Campbelltown, Nowra, Sydney, Grafton, Dubbo, Broken Hill and Wilcannia.
Australian Capital Territory	Canberra.
Victoria	Melbourne, Lake Tyers, Bairnsdale, Morwell, Ballarat, Geelong, Framlingham, Portland, Mildura, Swan Hill and Echuca.
Queensland	Brisbane, Rockhampton, Palm Island, Townsville, Cairns and Thursday Island.
South Australia	Mount Gambier, Port Augusta and Berri.
Western Australia	Perth, Halls Creek, Broome, Bunbury, and Katanning.
Northern Territory	Darwin and Alice Springs.
Tasmania	Hobart, Flinders Island, Cape Barren Island, Wybalenna, Launceston and Burnie.

The first hearings took place on 4 December 1995 on Flinders Island with the last round of hearings ending on 3 October 1996 in Sydney.

During the course of the inquiry 777 submissions were received, which included 535 Indigenous individual and group submissions, 49 church submissions and 7 government submissions.

500 of the submissions were made confidentially.

== Report summary ==
Two reports were produced:

- Formal, 700-page report Bringing them Home and subtitled Report of the National Inquiry into the Separation of Aboriginal and Torres Strait Islander Children from Their Families
- Less formal and shorter community guide called Bringing them Home—Community Guide and subtitled "A guide to the findings and recommendations of the National Inquiry into the separation of Aboriginal and Torres Strait Islander children from their families".

The Community Guide summarised the report's conclusions that "indigenous families and communities have endured gross violations of their human rights. These violations continue to affect indigenous people's daily lives. They were an act of genocide, aimed at wiping out indigenous families, communities, and cultures, vital to the precious and inalienable heritage of Australia".

== Recommendations ==
The report made many recommendations, including that:

- Funding be made available to Indigenous agencies to allow Indigenous people affected by the forcible removal policies to record their history
- Reparations be made to people forcibly removed from their families, and that the van Boven principles guide reparation measures
- Australian Parliaments offer official apologies and acknowledge the responsibility of their predecessors for the laws, policies, and practices of forcible removal

== Government apologies ==
Formal apologies have been tabled and passed by the Commonwealth Government, as well as the state parliaments of Victoria, South Australia, New South Wales, and Tasmania and the territory parliament of the Northern Territory. It may be that all states have done this because Senator Aden Ridgeway was quoted in 1999 as saying that "every State Parliament has passed an apology". Former Prime Minister John Howard issued a statement of regret but resolutely refused to issue a formal apology. He has been quoted many times as refusing to take a black armband view of history. Former prime minister Kevin Rudd, who succeeded Mr. Howard, tabled a formal apology on 13 February 2008, which was passed unanimously.

=== Federal ===
==== Motion of Reconciliation ====
Bringing Them Home recommended an official apology be offered by the Australian Government for past government welfare policies which had separated children from parents on racial grounds. The Howard government moved in response to draft a Motion of Reconciliation to be delivered by the Australian Parliament. Prime Minister John Howard drafted the wording in consultation with Democrat Senator Aden Ridgeway, the only Aboriginal person then sitting in the federal parliament.

On Thursday 26 August 1999, John Howard, moved the Motion of Reconciliation, which expressed "deep and sincere regret that indigenous Australians suffered injustices under the practices of past generations, and for the hurt and trauma that many indigenous people continue to feel as a consequence of those practices". It dedicated the Parliament to the "cause of reconciliation" and recognised the historic mistreatment of Indigenous Australians as the "most blemished chapter" in Australian history. The opposition leader Kim Beazley moved to replace Howard's motion of regret with an unreserved apology, but was unsuccessful.

==== The National Apology ====
On 11 December 2007, the newly elected government of Prime Minister Kevin Rudd announced that an official apology would be made to Indigenous Australians. The wording of the apology would be decided in consultation with Indigenous leaders. On 13 February 2008, at 9:00am (AEDT), Rudd tabled the following apology as the first order of business at the opening of Australia's Parliament in 2008; it was passed unanimously by the members of the lower house at 9:57 a.m.:

I move that:

Today we honour the Indigenous peoples of this land, the oldest continuing cultures in human history.
We reflect on their past mistreatment.
We reflect in particular on the mistreatment of those who were Stolen Generations—this blemished chapter in our national history.
The time has now come for the nation to turn a new page; a new page in Australia’s history by righting the wrongs of the past and so moving forward with confidence to the future.
We apologise for the laws and policies of successive Parliaments and governments, that have inflicted profound grief, suffering and loss on these our fellow Australians.
We apologise especially for the removal of Aboriginal and Torres Strait Islander children from their families, their communities and their country.
For the pain, suffering, and hurt of these Stolen Generations, their descendants and for their families left behind, we say sorry.
To the mothers and the fathers, the brothers and the sisters, for the breaking up of families and communities, we say sorry.
And for the indignity and degradation thus inflicted on a proud people and a proud culture, we say sorry.
We the Parliament of Australia respectfully request that this apology be received in the spirit in which it is offered as part of the healing of the nation.
For the future we take heart; resolving that this new page in the history of our great continent can now be written.
We today take this first step by acknowledging the past and laying claim to a future that embraces all Australians.
A future where this Parliament resolves that the injustices of the past must never, never happen again.
A future where we harness the determination of all Australians, Indigenous and non-Indigenous, to close the gap that lies between us in life expectancy, educational achievement, and economic opportunity.
A future where we embrace the possibility of new solutions to enduring problems where old approaches have failed.
A future based on mutual respect, mutual resolve and mutual responsibility.

A future where all Australians, whatever their origins, are truly equal partners, with equal opportunities and with an equal stake in shaping the next chapter in the history of this great country, Australia.

— Kevin Rudd, Prime Minister of Australia, 13 February 2008, at a sitting of the Parliament of Australia.

=== Western Australia ===
On 27 May 1997, the Western Australian Premier, Richard Court, issued a parliamentary statement using the words: "It is appropriate that this House show respect for Aboriginal families that have been forcibly separated as a consequence of government policy in the past, by observing a period of silence". Members stood for one minute silence. The next day the leader of the Western Australian opposition moved: "that this House apologises to the Aboriginal people on behalf of all Western Australians for the past policies under which Aboriginal children were removed from their families and expresses deep regret at the hurt and distress that this caused".

=== South Australia ===
On 28 May 1997, the Minister for Aboriginal Affairs, Dean Brown, issued a parliamentary apology on behalf of the people of South Australia, saying that the "South Australian Parliament expresses its deep and sincere regret at the forced separation of some Aboriginal children from their families and homes which occurred prior to 1964, apologises to these Aboriginal people for these past actions and reaffirms its support for reconciliation between all Australians".

=== Australian Capital Territory ===
On 17 June 1997, the Chief Minister of the Australian Capital Territory, Kate Carnell, moved a motion in the Territory Assembly that included the words: "that this Assembly apologises to the Ngunnawal people and other Aboriginal and Torres Strait Islanders in the ACT for the hurt and distress inflicted upon any people as a result of the separation of Aboriginal and Torres Strait Islander children from their families".

=== New South Wales ===
On 18 June 1997, Bob Carr, Premier of New South Wales, issued an apology on behalf of the people of NSW that included the words: "apologises unreservedly to the Aboriginal people of Australia for the systematic separation of generations of Aboriginal children from their parents, families, and communities".

=== Tasmania ===
On 13 August 1997, the Tasmanian Premier, Tony Rundle, moved a parliamentary motion that included the words: "That this Parliament, on behalf of all Tasmanians, expresses its deep and sincere regrets at the hurt and distress caused by past policies under which Aboriginal children were removed from their families and homes, apologises to the Aboriginal people for those past actions and reaffirms its support for reconciliation between all Australians".

=== Victoria ===
On 17 September 1997, the Premier of Victoria, Jeff Kennett, moved a parliamentary motion that included the words: "That this House apologises to the Aboriginal people on behalf of all Victorians for the past policies under which Aboriginal children were removed from their families and expresses deep regret at the hurt and distress this has caused and reaffirms its support for reconciliation between all Australians".

=== Queensland ===
On 26 May 1999, the Queensland Premier, Peter Beattie, issued a parliamentary statement that included the following words: "This house recognises the critical importance to Indigenous Australians and the wider community of a continuing reconciliation process, based on an understanding of, and frank apologies for, what has gone wrong in the past and total commitment to equal respect in the future."

=== Northern Territory ===
On 24 October 2001, the Northern Territory Chief Minister, Clare Martin, moved that the Northern Territory legislative assembly "apologises to Territorians who were removed from their families under the authority of the Commonwealth Aboriginals Ordinance and placed in institutional or foster care" and "calls upon the Commonwealth government to make a formal and specific apology to all those persons removed pursuant to the Aboriginals Ordinance, acknowledging that the Commonwealth failed in discharging its moral obligations towards them".

== Criticisms ==
The Howard government rejected some elements of the findings of the National Inquiry into the Separation of Aboriginal and Torres Strait Islander Children from Their Families, notably the recommendation for an "apology". John Herron, then Minister for Aboriginal Affairs, said: "the government does not support an official national apology. Such an apology could imply that present generations are in some way responsible and accountable for the actions of earlier generations; actions that were sanctioned by the laws of the time and that were believed to be in the best interests of the children concerned". Prime Minister John Howard believed that the term "apology" would suggest inter-generational guilt, and therefore left out the word "sorry" from his Motion of Reconciliation.

Other criticisms centred on the evidentiary standards applied. The Inquiry had sought to provide an opportunity to discover the experiences of people removed from their families. It was anticipated that given the trauma witnesses had experienced that they would be at risk of further trauma if they were to be cross examined on their testimony and their evidence challenged. Acting on this judgment the report, Bringing them Home, was written on the evidence presented. Among a number of criticisms of the report, also reflected in the arguments of those arguing the impact of the events described were exaggerated or minimising or denying their occurrence this "failure" to "prove the evidence" was considered critical, a number of other criticisms were made, chief among the critics were John Herron and Ron Brunton.

A number of responses, some critical, responded to the points raised by Herron and Brunton. Many of these arguments continue into the present around the formal apology to the Stolen Generations of 13 February 2008.
