= Cummeragunja walk-off =

1939 protest by Aboriginal Australians

- Date: 4 February 1939
- Location: Cummeragunja Station
- Participants: Jack Patten; Bill Onus; Eric Onus; William Cooper

The Cummeragunja walk-off was a 1939 protest by Aboriginal Australians at the Cummeragunja Station, an Aboriginal reserve in southern New South Wales. Approximately 100 residents of the station walked off in protest of their poor living conditions and mistreatment by the white station manager, as well as the perceived indifference of the Aborigines Protection Board and the state government. The protest was led by Aboriginal activist Jack Patten.

== Background ==
The Cummeragunja Mission was mostly home to Yorta Yorta people who had been relocated in the late 19th century from the Maloga Mission. In January 1935, according to W.B. Payne, a Church of Christ missionary, Christian churches were indifferent and neglecting Aboriginal people at the mission, "While thousands of pounds were being raised for missions in foreign countries the aborigines in Australia were regarded as outcasts". Over the years, the New South Wales government had tightened its control on the operation of the mission. By late 1938 people had become unhappy with the management of the mission, living conditions and restrictions on their movement.

The appointment of Arthur McQuiggan as manager of Cummeragunja precipitated a deterioration in relations between the Aboriginal residents and authorities. McQuiggan had previously been accused of beating boys at the Kinchela Aboriginal Boys' Home and accepted a transfer rather than be dismissed from his post. He and his wife, who assumed the role of matron, were "patronising and authoritarian", angering residents by failing to address poor sanitary conditions and by bringing a respected female elder before a local court where she was charged and convicted of a petty offence. William Cooper of the Australian Aborigines' League (AAL) visited the station in early 1938 and was "appalled by the conditions he saw", making complaints to the New South Wales state government and Premier Bertram Stevens.

In October 1938, the residents of Cummeragunja petitioned the Aborigines Protection Board to dismiss the McQuiggans, setting out a list of grievances. They were supported by Cooper and the AAL which called for an independent inquiry into the board's actions. However, the board refused to receive the petition and returned the document to McQuiggan, who publicly displayed it and invited signatories to remove their names. His actions were widely seen as an insult and raised fears of retaliation.

In November 1938, Jack Patten visited Cummeragunja as part of a tour of Aboriginal communities in New South Wales. In the same year he had established The Australian Abo Call as the first newspaper catering to Aboriginal people. At Cummeragunja, where his brother George and other family members lived, Patten addressed a meeting of residents but was met with a police presence. He subsequently reported to Sydney newspapers a number of issues at the reserve, including that multiple children had died of malnutrition, that "mental and physical cruelty" were being inflicted by white officials, and that the Aborigines Protection Board was allowed Aboriginal people to use only 14 acres (5.7 ha) of the reserve, which totaled over 2,900 acres (1,200 ha).

== Protest ==
On 1 February 1939, Patten returned to the station and addressed a meeting of residents at the station hall. At the meeting he outlined the new legislation the state government was intending to introduce, described conditions on other supervised reserves, claimed children were going to be removed, and alleged the station would become a closed compound under the Board's new policy.

Several residents left Cummeragunja immediately following Patten's speech. He telegrammed the state government that residents were leaving, which he attributed to intimidation, starvation and victimisation, and demanded an immediate inquiry. Patten addressed a further impromptu meeting two days later, after which he and his brother were arrested and charged with "enticing Aborigines to leave a reserve". The walk-off was in contravention of rules set by the Board.

Patten's arrested spurred a further walk-off of residents, who collected their belongings and began leaving in groups, many of which crossed the Murray River into Victorian jurisdiction and set up camp on the riverbanks near Barmah. The number of residents who left is uncertain but was likely around 100, although contemporary sources reported figures between 60 and 300 people. Activist Bill Onus put off his potential career as a budding actor to return from Melbourne to his place of birth for the walk-off.

== Media coverage ==
While the walk-off received widespread coverage in mainstream newspapers, it was "heavily influenced by contemporary racism and so was profoundly unsympathetic". The board produced a narrative that residents had "panicked or been misled by agitators", which was repeated without further analysis.

A number of participants in the walk-off were interviewed by journalists and reported various motivations. Shadrach James stated that his people "had for years lived in a hand to mouth fashion, often in a semi-starved condition", while another resident reported that the infant death rate at the reserve had been substantial. Other common complaints were the cruelty of the McQuiggans, the loss of land promised by the board (including land which Aboriginal people had cleared for farming that had been leased to white farmers), and the threat of child removals.

== Legacy ==
Many of the people who left the mission in February 1939 settled in northern Victoria in towns such as Barmah, Echuca and Shepparton.

The walk-off was one of the first mass protests by Indigenous Australians, and had significant impact on events that followed later, such the 1967 referendum.

The third episode of the 1981 miniseries, Women of the Sun, is a fictional story based on the walk-off.

In October 2010, the opera Pecan Summer, based on the walk-off, opened in Mooroopna, near Shepparton. Deborah Cheetham – whose uncle Jimmy Little was born at Cummeragunja Mission – wrote, composed and performed in this production by the Short Black Opera Company.

In 2020, Ross Morgan, a Yorta Yorta man, designed the Collingwood Football Club's Indigenous guernsey which was worn against North Melbourne in round 13 as part of the Australian Football League's Sir Doug Nicholls round tradition. According to Morgan, the walk-off is still strongly remembered by those who were involved and their descendants.
