= NAIDOC Week =

Observance week for Australian Indigenous peoples

- Dates: First full week in July each year
- Location: Australia
- Years active: 1975–present
- Website: naidoc.org.au

NAIDOC Week (/ˈneɪdɒk/ NAY-dok) is an Australian observance lasting from the first Sunday in July until the following Sunday, (5th of July- 12th of July) The acronym NAIDOC stands for National Aborigines and Islanders Day Observance Committee. (Note: According the NAIDOC website, whilst the committee recognises the word "aborigines" is a "defunct and inaccurate term", the term is retained "due to [its] historic use by our Elders in establishing this week of commemoration in 1938". However, the committee is popularly known as the National Aboriginal and Islander Day Observance Committee.) NAIDOC Week has its roots in the 1938 Day of Mourning, becoming a week-long event in 1975.

NAIDOC Week celebrates the history, culture, and achievements of Aboriginal and Torres Strait Islander peoples in Australia. The week is observed not just by Indigenous Australian communities but also by government agencies, schools, local councils, and workplaces.

In 1984, NADOC (the forerunner of NAIDOC) requested that National Aborigines Day be made a national public holiday to help celebrate and recognise the rich cultural history of Aboriginal and Torres Strait Islander peoples in Australia. There is no national public holiday in NAIDOC Week, but there have been calls by some Indigenous leaders to create one.

== History of the observance ==
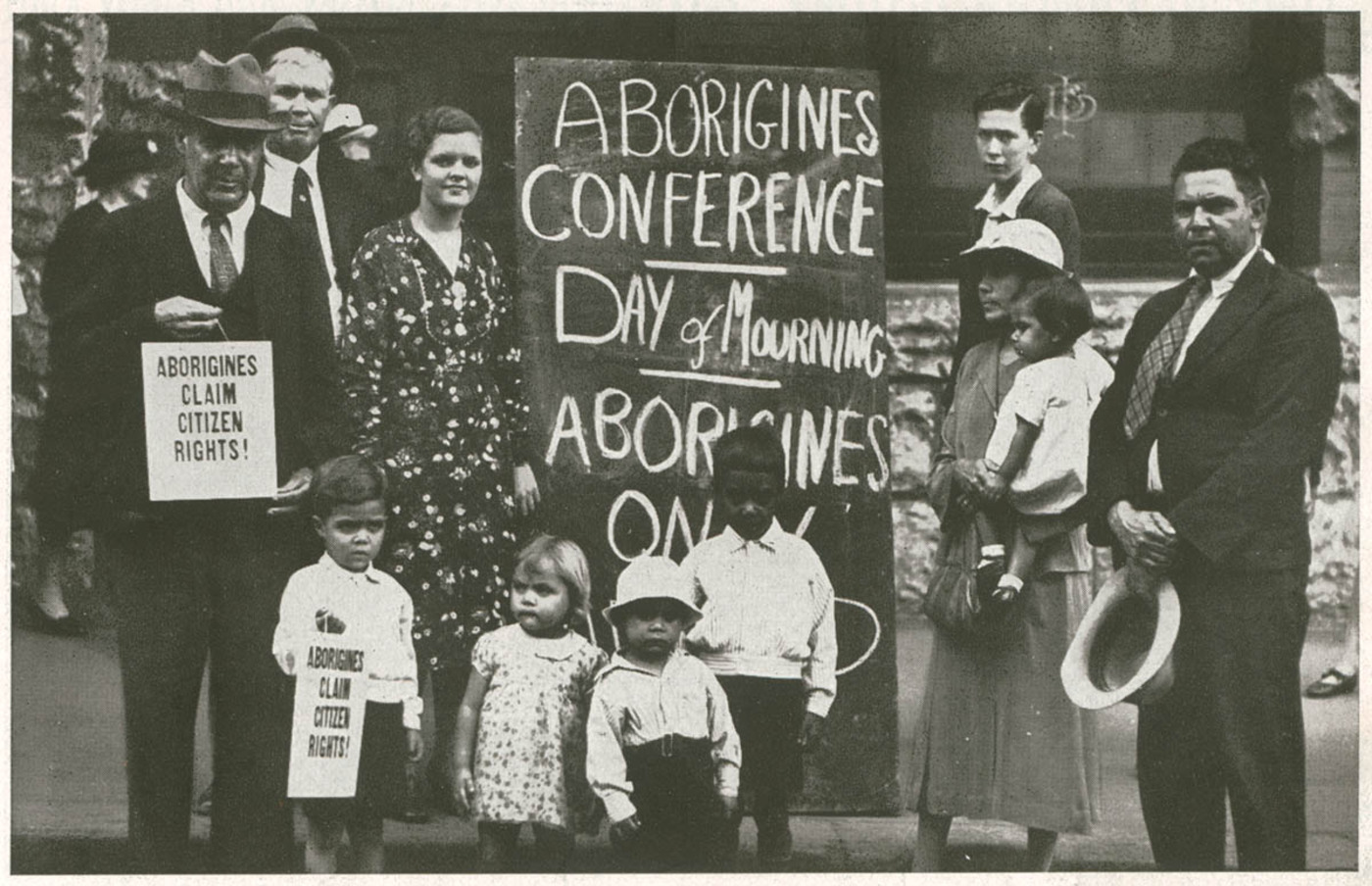
First Nations Protest, "Day of Mourning", 1938

=== Day of Mourning (1938) ===
The idea behind NAIDOC goes back to a letter written by William Cooper that was aimed at Aboriginal communities and at churches. It was written on behalf of the Australian Aborigines Progressive Association, an umbrella group for a number of Aboriginal justice movements, and endorsed by around 100 Aboriginal delegates.

The association gathered together a wide circle of Indigenous leaders including Douglas Nicholls, William Ferguson, Jack Patten and Margaret Tucker. In 1937 they organised the Day of Mourning. This day was called to:

to call the attention to the present deplorable condition of all aborigines, of whatever stage of culture, after 150 years of British rule. It is expected that such action will create such sympathy on the part of the whites that full justice and recompense will follow.

The organisers requested that all Christian denominations would observe the day and that:

sermons be preached on this day dealing with the aboriginal people and their need of the gospel and response to it and we ask that special prayer be invoked for all missionary and other effort for the uplift of the dark people.

The Day was discussed in newspapers, with David Unaipon arguing against it, stating that the "most effective way of helping the natives is not by weeping and bemoaning the past, but by acting in the level present" and that instead the day should be celebrated with "a national programme, by which all the privileges of the dominant race ... be given to the blacks". Subsequently, members of the Australian Aborigines Progressive Association met with then prime minister Joseph Lyons to argue for representation in the federal parliament by a non-voting member to represent Aboriginal people.

The message to the churches was eventually heeded, with Anglican Archbishop of Brisbane William Wand commending the proposal in 1940 and the day was nationally observed by at least 1946.

=== NAIDOC day of remembrance (1957) ===
By 1957, the leaders of the movement decided to change the date from January to July. The National Aborigines Day Observance Committee (NADOC) and the first Sunday in July became a day of remembrance and celebration for Aboriginal people and heritage.

=== NAIDOC Week (1991) ===
In 1991 NADOC became NAIDOC (National Aborigines and Islanders Day Observance Committee), to recognise Torres Strait Islanders and to describe a whole week of recognition, rather than one day.

The committee's acronym has since become the name of the week itself.

=== COVID-19 impact ===
In 2020, NAIDOC Week was disrupted by the COVID-19 pandemic in Australia, and postponed from July to 8−15 November 2020. However the national NAIDOC Awards, due to take place in Mparntwe / Alice Springs, were cancelled owing to continuing uncertainties. The 2021 National NAIDOC Awards ceremony was scheduled for 3 July 2021, but again cancelled. An event was then planned for 3 July at the Sydney Opera House. However, by July Sydney was in COVID-19 lockdown, and the Sydney ceremony was postponed. Due to the continuing pandemic, NAIDOC Week 2021 was also postponed; events for it in the Northern Territory were rescheduled to start on 11 July, but some events were cancelled.

== NAIDOC Week activities ==
NAIDOC activities are held across Australia, activities include cultural and educational activities in schools and workplaces and public displays.

NAIDOC Week activities might include listening to Indigenous Australian music, reading dream time stories, visiting Indigenous Australian websites on the Internet, organising an art competition and watching programmes on both Australian television (and their streaming services) related to the week.

Television stations such as the ABC and SBS structure programming across the week to celebrate events, actors and more on their various channels (as well as their streaming services).

Major celebratory events take place in Australia's major cities as well as in larger rural Aboriginal and Torres Strait Islander communities, including Alice Springs, Hermannsburg, Shepparton and Mildura.

=== National NAIDOC Awards ===
The National NAIDOC Awards Ceremony and Ball, celebrating the end of NAIDOC Week festivities is held in a different host city each year. The Ball features Indigenous food and live bands.

=== NAIDOC Poster Competition ===
The first NAIDOC poster was created in 1972 to promote "Aborigines Day". The protest nature of the poster continued until 1977 with titles like "Self Determination" and "Chains or Chance" publicising political change and a day of remembrance.

=== National NAIDOC themes and host cities ===
- 1972: "Advance Australia Where?"
- 1973: "It's Time For Mutual Understanding"
- 1974: "Self-Determination"
- 1975: "Justice for Urban Aboriginal Children"
- 1976: "Trucanini Last of her People Born 18?? . Died 1876. Buried 1976. Received Her Land Rights at Last"
- 1977: "Chains or Change"
- 1978: "Cultural Revival is Survival"
- 1979: "1979 International Year of the Child. What About Our Kids!"
- 1980: "Treat Us to a Treaty on Land Rights"
- 1981: "Sacred Sites Aboriginal Rights-Other Australians Have Their Rites"
- 1982: "Race For Life For a Race"
- 1983: "Let's Talk—We Have Something to Say"
- 1984: "Take a Journey of Discovery – To the Land My Mother" (Adelaide)
- 1985: "Understanding: It Takes the Two of Us" (Melbourne)
- 1986: "Peace—Not For You—Not For Me But For All" (Adelaide)
- 1987: "White Australia Has a Black History" (Perth)
- 1988: "Recognise and Share the Survival of the Oldest Culture in the World" (Brisbane)
- 1989: "The Party is Over—Let's Be Together as an Aboriginal Nation" (Darwin)
- 1990: "New Decade——Don’t Destroy, Learn and Enjoy Our Cultural Heritage" (Tasmania)
- 1991: "Community is Unity—Our Future Depends on Us" (Sydney)
- 1992: "Maintain the Dreaming—Our Culture is Our Heritage" (Canberra)
- 1993: "Aboriginal Nations—Owners of the Land Since Time Began—Community is Unity" (Darwin)
- 1994: "Families Are the Basis of Our Existence—Maintain the Link" (Melbourne)
- 1995: "Justice Not Tolerance" (Perth)
- 1996: "Survive—Revive—Come Alive" (Adelaide)
- 1997: "Gurindji, Mabo, Wik-Three Strikes for Justice-Celebrating the 1967 Referendum" (Brisbane)
- 1998: "Bringing Them Home" (Broome)
- 1999: "Respect" (Alice Springs)
- 2000: "Building Pride in Our Communities" (Townsville)
- 2001: "Treaty—Let's Get it Right" (Melbourne)
- 2002: "Recognition, Rights and Reform" (Sydney)
- 2003: "Our Children Our Future" (Hobart)
- 2004: "Self-determination-Our Community—Our Future—Our Responsibility" (Perth)
- 2005: "Our Future Begins with Solidarity" (Adelaide)
- 2006: "Respect the Past-Believe in the Future" (Cairns)
- 2007: "50 Years: Looking Forward, Looking Blak" (Darwin)
- 2008: "Advance Australia Fair?" (Canberra)
- 2009: "Honouring Our Elders, Nurturing Our Youth" (Brisbane)
- 2010: "Unsung Heroes – Closing the Gap by Leading Their Way" (Melbourne)
- 2011: "Change: the next step is ours" (Sydney)
- 2012: "Spirit of the Tent Embassy: 40 years on" (Hobart)
- 2013: "We value the vision: Yirrkala Bark Petitions 1963" (Perth)
- 2014: "Serving Country: Centenary & Beyond" (Gold Coast)
- 2015: "We all Stand on Sacred Ground: Learn, Respect and Celebrate" (Adelaide)
- 2016: "Songlines: The living narrative of our nation" (Darwin)
- 2017: "Our languages matter" (Cairns)
- 2018: "Because of her, we can!" (Sydney)
- 2019: "Voice Treaty Truth" (Melbourne)
- 2020: "Always Was, Always Will Be"
- 2021: "Heal Country, heal our nation"
- 2022: "Get Up! Stand Up! Show Up!"
- 2023: "For Our Elders"
- 2024: "Keep the Fire Burning! Blak, Loud & Proud"
- 2025: "The Next Generation: Strength, Vision & Legacy" (Perth)
- 2026: "50 Deadly Years"

=== Football ===
In Western Australia, an Australian rules football match between Claremont and South Fremantle in the West Australian Football League has been played during NAIDOC week since 2007, with the winner being awarded the Jimmy Melbourne Cup, in honour of the first Indigenous Australian player to play senior football in a major Australian football league.

== See also ==
- National Reconciliation Week
- National Sorry Day
