= Thomas Shadrach James =

- Born: Thomas Shadrach Peersahib; September 1, 1859; Moka, Mauritius
- Died: January 9, 1946 (aged 86); Shepparton, Australia
- Resting place: Cummeragunja Reserve
- Spouse: Ada Cooper
- Children: Miriam, Priscilla, Shadrach Livingstone James, Rebecca, Garfield, Ivy, Carey

Thomas Shadrach James (1 September 1859 – 9 January 1946), born Thomas Shadrach Peersahib, was a Methodist lay preacher, linguist and herbalist. However, it was as a teacher, first at Maloga Aboriginal Mission and later at Cummeragunja Reserve, that he is remembered in history. Through this role, he equipped and influenced generations of Aboriginal Australian activists, including Margaret Tucker, Pastor Doug Nicholls, George Patten, Jack Patten, William Cooper and Bill Onus.

== Early life ==
James was born in Mauritius in 1859. On his birth certificate, James is recorded as being Thomas Shadrach Peersahib. His father was denoted as James Peersahib (in other documents, this name is Peersaib). And his mother was Esther née Thomas. The couple were both Tamil, of Indian descent living in Mauritius. His father James had been raised a Muslim in Madras and had moved to Mauritius to work as an interpreter to Magistrate Edward Henry Martindale at Wilhelms Plaines. However, following some years of hardship at Black River had asked a local missionary to become a Christian and later became a catechist in the Anglican church.

As a young man, James lived in Port Louis and was educated at the local school. Even as a teenager, he achieved local stature as an educator of other boys. However, in his later teens he was traumatised, first by the death of his younger brother Samson (in 1875), then the death of his mother shortly afterwards, and by the quick remarriage of his father to Luckheea, which he saw as insensitive. With these misgivings, he decided to make a journey to Australia and began using James as his surname, presumably to honour his father, though he would never see him again. James was fluent in Tamil, French, English and probably, later, Yorta Yorta.

His interest in medicine and preaching may have come from his mother's family back in Ceylon. His maternal uncle Manuel as well as his cousins Gamiel and William "Nesam" Paranesam were all deacons of the Anglican Church. So too was his cousin Abishegam Thomas, who was also a medical doctor. Abishegam's family remember that, even as a young teen, "Shadrach was a really brilliant student; he was not only brilliant, his English was perfect and he did very good work".

== Career ==
James arrived in Tasmania in 1879, applying for a teaching job on 23 August, and may have taught there for sometime. He probably then moved to Melbourne to begin studying medicine, but he developed typhus, with subsequent shakes making a future in surgery impossible. With that setback, he found himself greatly attracted to the work of mission - after meeting a great number of Aboriginal evangelists and singers at Brighton in Melbourne on 3 January 1881.

The group of 25 Aboriginal Australian men and women had travelled down from the Maloga Mission, and James was introduced to the founder of the mission, Daniel Matthews, by a mutual friend, shipping entrepreneur Charles Crosby. It is recorded that James believed, “God spoke to me that day!”. In the memory of Daniel's son, John Kerr Matthews, "the result was that Mr James offered to assist in the mission work without remuneration". The missionary accepted his offer.

James became permanent assistant to Daniel Matthews when the Maloga School received its recognition as a State School on 1 August 1881, and from then on he received a government salary. Then, when Matthews formally resigned as official teacher at Maloga in August 1883, the department installed "The gentle Indian schoolteacher, Thomas James, who was much liked by his pupils...". In 1883 he was appointed Head Teacher of the school.

When the residents of Maloga left the mission to settle at Cummeragunja in 1888, James relocated his school at the reserve. While at Cummeragunja, he worked as a translator of the Yorta Yorta language. He continued to preach and evangelise, not just at Cummeragunja (where he was the Sunday School teacher), but out of town too, to Aboriginal people and to white farmers, in places like Nathalia and Picola. He would also take Aboriginal people to Sunday school, in order to "assist in preaching the Gospel of Salvation to the settlers on the Victorian side of the Murray".

During his career, he had many struggles with authorities, including some mission managers, such as Mr Harris; as well as, at times, the Department of Education and the NSW Board for the Protection of Aborigines (known as APB). His preaching caused concern, as it apparently caused discontent. One sermon, on 7 February 1909, was interpreted as inciting unrest about the removal of the Aboriginal farm blocks. Mrs Harris, the manager's wife, wrote that James was being "disloyal to the APB who were trying to bring about friendly relations between the blacks and whites". The APB blamed him for unrest at Cummeragunja, and the Board and managers began speaking openly about their fears that he was giving the people ideas – enabling them to write petitions and complain. The APB tried to sack him twice; however, this was not easily achieved, as he led a very successful teaching team, with marks for children, both black and white, being above average for the state. The 1908 departmental report found that the Cummeragunja school had “earnest, capable and enthusiastic teachers. They are thoroughly in sympathy with the whole of the coloured parents and children and their influence is a good one”.

== Later life ==
In 1922 James retired from teaching, having been removed as head teacher. He had hoped that his son, who was his teaching assistant, would be appointed as his replacement. However the New South Wales Government decided to appoint someone else.

From there James moved to North Fitzroy, and worked as a herbalist and masseur, specialising in treatment of arthritis.It is recorded that James published a book on Aboriginal culture called Heritage in Stone; however, no copy can currently be found.

== Death and legacy ==
James died in January 1946 in Shepparton and was buried at Cummeragunja.

Over the course of his four decades of teaching James taught many Aboriginal people who later rose to prominence, including Douglas Nicholls (his nephew), William Cooper (his brother-in-law) and Bill Onus. Essentially, the men and women became who went on to be the founders of the Australian Aborigines' League in Melbourne had all came from the "scholar’s hut" of James. He taught them reading and writing (according to a letter he wrote to Chief Inspector Thomas Pearson on 28 August 1891); however it seems he also gave these leaders rhetorical skills, an understanding of government and rights.

== Family ==
In 1885 James married Ada Bethel Cooper, who had been one of the older students at his school when he first attended. Records in the mission journal described it as a "red letter day":

"A great deal of trouble was taken in preparation for this important occasion. Houses and all the surroundings were exceptionally tidy. Visitors came, and our people were all smiles. One of the most important unions that ever took place at the mission was to be celebrated. Mr James, the teacher, was to be marreid to Miss Ada Cooper, one of our earliest half-caste Mission girls, and who has been a pupil of her affianced for several years. At 3p.m. the ceremony began. Blacks—disaffected and friendly—came from far and near. Al[l] differences were buried in the stern realities of the hour. The old meetinghouse was crammed to its fullest capacity. the service was a grave and solemn one, and conducted grandly by the visiting clergyman. Ada looked well in her pretty dress and bridal veil, with wreath of pretty white flowers."

Ada was a Yorta Yorta woman, whose mother, Kitty, was one of the elders of the community. The couple had eight children, including Shadrach Livingstone James, who later became an Aboriginal activist and noted public speaker.

The playwright Andrea James is the great-granddaughter of Thomas Shadrach James, granddaughter of his eldest son Shadrach.
