= Shadrach Livingstone James =

Australian activist (1890–1956)

- Born: 15 May 1890; Cummeragunja Reserve, Australia
- Died: 7 August 1956 (aged 66); Geelong, Australia
- Resting place: Mooroopna
- Parent(s): Thomas Shadrach James; Ada Bethel Cooper
- Relatives: Douglas Nicholls (cousin); William Cooper (brother-in-law)

Shadrach Livingstone James (15 May 1890 – 7 August 1956) was a teacher, unionist and Aboriginal Australian activist.

== Early life and education ==
James was born in 1890, the eldest son of Thomas Shadrach James and Ada Bethel Cooper at the Cummeragunja Aboriginal Reserve in New South Wales. His father was a Mauritian-born teacher and his mother a member of the Yorta Yorta people.

In 1909, James married Maggie Campbell in Echuca. The couple had seven children, three sons and four daughters.

James was educated in the mission school run by his father and eventually became qualified as a teaching assistant. After worked with his father it was assumed that he would be appointed his successor as head teacher; however, the New South Wales government declined to appoint him to the position.

== Working life ==
In 1928, James and his family moved to Mooroopna where he worked for Ardmona Fruit Products Co-operative. He was elected as secretary of the local branch of the Food Preservers' Union and was for a time vice-president of the Goulburn district council.

== Activism ==
Between 1928(or 1933?) and 1955 was honorary secretary of the Australian Aborigines' League, which he helped to establish in Melbourne in 1933, along with his brother-in-law William Cooper and others. (Note: ADB calls it the Aboriginal Progressive Association of Victoria, but the SBS interview with his granddaughter confirms that they were referring to the same organisation. There is a discrepancy with the dates though.) In this role he was active in lobbying government to improve living conditions for Aboriginal people.

James faced bureaucratic opposition due to his mixed-race heritage.

== Death and legacy ==
James died in 1956 of a heart attack in Geelong and was buried in Mooroopna Cemetery.

The playwright Andrea James is his granddaughter.
