= Anna Euphemia Morgan =

Aboriginal leader (1874–1935)

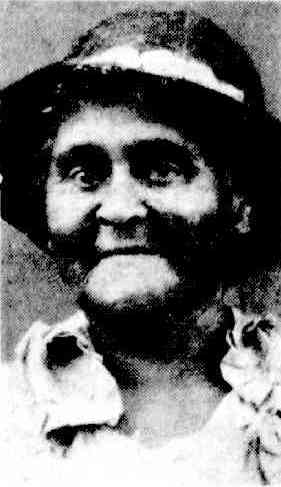
- Born: October 7, 1874
- Died: August 1, 1935 (aged 60)
- Occupation: indigenous rights activist

Anna Euphemia Morgan (7 October 1874 – 1 August 1935) was an Australian Aboriginal activist.

== Life and work ==
Anna Morgan was born in 1874 at the Ebenezer mission station in northwest Victoria to Nathan Bowden and his wife Margaret. In 1859 the mission station was founded by the Protestant Moravian Church as one of eight missions in Australia.

In 1885 Morgan was working as a domestic servant in the Wimmera region. Around 1894 she moved to New South Wales, near Cummeragunja Station, where she worked as a servant. In 1899 she married the worker Caleb Morgan (c. 1874-1943), with whom she had three children.

In 1888 the residents of Cummeragunja were allotted agricultural blocks for self-sufficiency, and her husband received 12 ha of land. In 1907 the Aboriginal Protection Board in New South Wales rescinded the land tenure agreement so that all profits went to the board. Her husband protested this new order and was expelled from Cummeragunja. She left immediately with the family, leaving many of their belongings behind. When they returned to collect them a few months later, her husband was charged and tied up for a fortnight. The family then moved to Wagga Wagga, where Caleb Morgan worked as a farmhand. In 1927 they returned to Victoria, first to Swan Hill and then to Coldstream, a few miles from Coranderrk Aboriginal Reservation.

In 1930, the Morgans applied for support, which was turned down because they were considered half-castes. She then applied for a Commonwealth pension but was unsuccessful due to her classification as Aboriginal.

After this experience, she became involved in a campaign for Aboriginal equality. She published an article in Labor Call in September 1934, where she told the story of a life constrained by government regulations and articulated calls for justice and equality. In a series on the Melbourne radio station, she shared stories passed down from her grandmother. She was able to use her public profile to draw attention to her political messages.

She joined the Australian Aborigines' League and visited the Minister for the Interior in 1935 as part of a delegation requesting Aboriginal education. She also spoke at the International Committee on Women's Day meeting that same month.

Anna Morgan died in Coldstream on 1 August 1935 at 60 from an acute kidney infection and was buried in Melbourne Cemetery.
