= Andrea James (playwright) =

Australian playwright

- Born: Sydney, New South Wales, Australia
- Occupation: Playwright

Andrea James is an Aboriginal Australian playwright and theatre director, best known for her plays Yanagai Yanagai and Sunshine Super Girl, the latter about tennis star Evonne Goolagong Cawley.

== Early life and education ==
Andrea James is a Yorta Yorta/Gunaikurnai woman, who also has Polish and Tamil heritage. She is the great-granddaughter of Thomas Shadrach James and granddaughter of Shadrach Livingstone James.

She graduated from the Victorian College of the Arts.

== Career ==
James has produced plays for Carriageworks, Blacktown Arts Centre, Urban Theatre Projects, La Mama Theatre and Ilbijerri, among others. Her works have been staged throughout Australia as well as in the United Kingdom, Paris and New York City.

She worked as Aboriginal arts development officer at Blacktown Arts Centre, before being appointed as Artistic Director of Melbourne Workers Theatre in 2001, occupying this role until 2008. It was here that she wrote and produced Yangali Yangali.

James' play Sunshine Super Girl, about Wiradjuri champion tennis player Evonne Goolagong Cawley, has been produced by Performing Lines. It premiered in Griffith, New South Wales in October 2020 (its Melbourne Theatre Company debut having been postponed owing to the COVID-19 pandemic in Victoria), subsequently being performed at the Sydney Festival in January 2021. The play is commencing a tour starting at the Darwin Festival in August 2022.

In 2021 James was appointed as an associate artist at the Griffin Theatre Company in Sydney, where she is producing Melissa Bubnic's Ghosting the Party which opened at the Stables Theatre, Sydney in May, until 18 June 2022.

A rock 'n' roll theatre show titled Big Name, No Blanket, written by James and performed by Ilbijerri Theatre, premiered at the Sydney Festival in January 2024. James was assisted by Sammy Tjapanangka Butcher as story and cultural consultant, and the show was co-directed by Rachael Maza and Anyupa Butcher (Sammy's daughter). The show, which was also performed at several other major festivals, celebrates the journey and impact of the Warumpi Band, In October 2024 a slightly scaled-down version of the show undertook a tour of 16 prisons.

In 2025, James was appointed Artistic Director and co-CEO of ILBIJERRI Theatre Company, following the departure of Rachael Maza.

== Recognition and awards ==
- Recipient of an Arts NSW Aboriginal Arts Fellowship
- 2013: Recipient ACCELERATE, a program run jointly by the Australia Council and British Council for Aboriginal Art Leaders
- Writer-in-residence at Melbourne Theatre Company
- 2022: Mona Brand Award for Women Stage and Screen Writers, for her body of work
- 2026: Shortlisted for the Victorian Premier's Prize for Drama for The Black Woman of Gippsland
- 2026: Winner of the Nick Enright Prize for Playwriting, NSW Premier's Literary Awards for The Black Woman of Gippsland

== Works ==
- Yangali Yangali
- Coranderrk: We Will Show the Country (2016) (co-writer, with Giordano Nanni
- Blacktown Angels for Home Country
- Bukal
- Winyanboga Yurringa
- Bright World
- Home Country
- The Torch
- Winyanboga Yurringa
- Dogged (co-writer, with Cath Ryan)
- The Black Woman of Gippsland
