= Margaret Tucker =

Aboriginal Australian activist and writer

Margaret Tucker MBE
- Born: Margaret Lilardia Tucker; 28 March 1904; Warangesda Aboriginal Mission, New South Wales, Australia
- Died: 23 August 1996 (aged 92)
- Occupations: Writer; Indigenous rights activist

Margaret Lilardia Tucker MBE (28 March 1904 – 23 August 1996) was an Aboriginal Australian activist and writer who was among the first Aboriginal authors to publish an autobiography If Everyone Cared, in 1977; a new edition of this work was published in 2024.

== Early life ==
Margaret Tucker was born at Warrangesda Mission near Narrandera to William Clements, a Wiradjuri man, and Theresa Clements, née Middleton, a member of the Yorta Yorta Nation. She spent her childhood at Cummeragunja Aboriginal Reserve.

In 1917 aged 13, she was forcibly removed to the Cootamundra Domestic Training Home for Aboriginal Girls, where she was badly treated. After two years of training in white domestic practices, in 1919 she was sent to work for a white family in Sydney, where she was abused. The Aborigines Protection Board intervened and she was given another placement from which she ran away. In 1925 the Board released her and she moved to Melbourne.

== Activism ==
In the 1930s Tucker began campaigning for Indigenous rights with William Cooper, Bill Onus and Douglas Nicholls and in 1932 was one of the founding members of the Australian Aborigines' League. During this time she married and gave birth to a daughter, Mollie. In 1938, Tucker represented the League during the Day of Mourning protest, which was held on the 150th anniversary of British colonisation of Australia. She was also part of the delegation that met with Prime Minister Joseph Lyons to discuss the demands of the Aborigines Progressive Association, who had organised the protest. At first influenced by the Communist Party of Australia, she gravitated later towards the conservative Moral Re-Armament movement. This deepened with an eight-month stay at Mackinac Island. In the 1960s she founded the United Council of Aboriginal and Islander Women and in 1964 she was the first Indigenous appointee to the Victorian Aborigines Welfare Board.

Tucker was awarded the MBE in 1968, recognising her welfare services to Aboriginal Australians.

== Autobiography ==
Her 1977 autobiography If Everyone Cared was one of the first books to bring to light the mistreatment of her people.

When originally published significant alterations were made to the text to cater to non-Indigenous readers who had limited knowledge of Aboriginal culture and, in doing so, Tucker's tone and content were altered. To address this her memoir was republished in 2024 as If Everyone Cared Enough: her voice reclaimed and this version draws directly from the handwritten manuscript which is held at the National Library of Australia.

== Awards ==
Margaret Tucker was inducted in the Victorian Women's Honour Roll, one of the first to receive the honour, in 2001.
