= Jimmy Melbourne =

Personal information
- Full name: James Edward Melbourne
- Born: c. 1876; York, Western Australia
- Died: 13 December 1937; South Melbourne, Victoria

Playing career^{1}
Years	Club	Games (Goals)
1900–1901	West Perth	22 (5)
1902	South Fremantle	4
1903–1904	Subiaco	
- ^{1} Playing statistics correct to the end of 1904.

James Edward Melbourne (c. 1876 – 13 December 1937) was the first Indigenous Australian to play senior Australian rules football in the Western Australian Football Association.

Melbourne was orphaned at the age of four and spent his formative years in a Middle Swan orphanage before being put into the care of various businessmen in York. As a teenager, he was an accomplished jockey and spent time in prison for petty crimes (including stealing, cashing a cheque, passing counterfeit coins, and escaping from a lock-up).

Melbourne played his first game for West Perth against East Fremantle in the Western Australian Football Association on 2 June 1900 and was a member of their 1901 premiership side. He then moved to South Fremantle in 1902, playing four games, and then went to play for Subiaco in 1903 and 1904. In 1907, Melbourne played in the Collie Football Association, and then in the Bunbury Football Association until 1908. He was also a boxer and professional runner. In the later stages of his life he moved to Melbourne, Victoria, and joined the Australian Imperial Force at the outbreak of World War I.

On 13 December 1937, Melbourne was murdered at his home in South Melbourne, Victoria. At this time he is recorded as being married or living with Mary Edith Melbourne, a former war nurse. His landlord was convicted of Melbourne's manslaughter and sentenced to five years in prison. Melbourne is buried at Springvale Botanical Cemetery in Melbourne.

Since 2007, Melbourne's name has been perpetuated with the Jimmy Melbourne Cup being awarded to the winners of a game played between South Fremantle and Claremont during National Aboriginal Islander Day Observance Committee Week (known as NAIDOC Week). These are the two WAFL clubs that have featured the most Aboriginal players.
