= Australian Aborigines' League =

Aboriginal Australian activist organisation founded by William Cooper in 1933

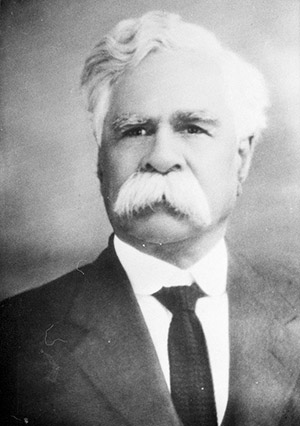
William Cooper was a founder of the AAL

The Australian Aborigines' League was established in Melbourne, Australia, in 1933 by William Cooper and others, including Margaret Tucker, Eric Onus, Anna and Caleb Morgan, and Shadrach James (son of Thomas Shadrach James and brother-in-law of Cooper). Cooper was secretary of the League.

In a letter to the editor of The West Australian, Cooper wrote "The plea of our league is a fair deal for the dark race". The League campaigned for the repeal of discriminatory legislation and for programs to "uplift the aboriginal race".

An early initiative by the League was to petition King George V in 1933 for Indigenous Australians to be represented in the Australian Parliament, among other requests. 1,814 signatures were collected on the petition, although it was reported that Cooper believed many Aboriginal people living on missions and reserves were too afraid to add their signature.

In 1938 it joined the New South Wales-based Aborigines Progressive Association in staging a Day of Mourning on Australia Day (26 January) in Sydney to draw attention to the treatment of Aborigines and to demand full citizenship and equal rights. Mr. W. Ferguson, organising secretary of the Aborigines' Progressive Association of New South Wales, said of the planned national day of mourning: "The aborigines do not want protection... We have been protected for 150 years, and look what has become of us. Scientists have studied us and written books about us as though we were some strange curiosities, but they have not prevented us from contracting tuberculosis and other diseases, which have wiped us out in thousands". In 1939 the League also supported the mass walk-off at Cummeragunja Reserve, an Aboriginal reserve.

On 6 December 1938, following the pogrom known as Kristallnacht in Germany, a delegation of League members, led by Cooper, went to the German consulate in Melbourne with a petition protesting against the "cruel persecution of the Jewish people by the Nazi government of Germany". This was one of the first protests against the Nazis' actions in the world.

The League was less active after Cooper's death in 1941 but was revived after the Second World War by Douglas Nicholls and by Eric and Bill Onus. In the 1960s it became the Victorian branch of the Aborigines Advancement League.

== See also ==
- Aborigines Advancement League, Victoria
- Aborigines Progressive Association, New South Wales
- Aborigines' Advancement League of South Australia
- Day of Mourning (Australia)
- Voting rights of Aboriginal and Torres Strait Islander peoples
