= Day of Mourning (Australia) =

1938 day of protest by Indigenous Australians against British invasion 150 years earlier

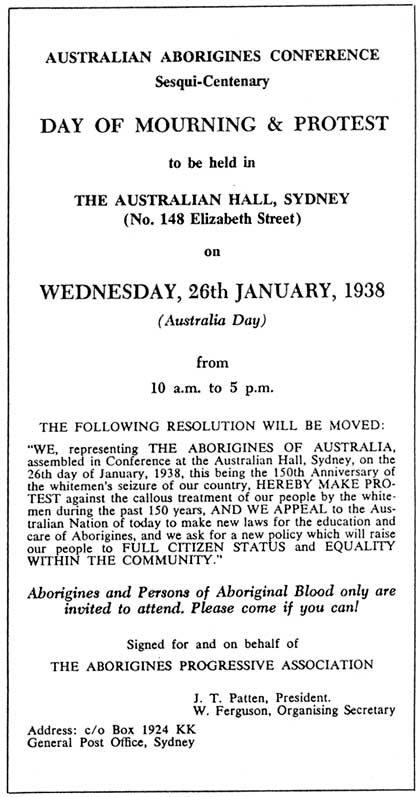
Proclamation of the Day of Mourning.

The Day of Mourning was a protest held by Aboriginal Australians on 26 January 1938, the 150th anniversary of the arrival of the First Fleet and the British colonisation of Australia. It was held to draw attention to the poor treatment of Aboriginal people and entrenched racial discrimination. The protest purposefully coincided with Australia Day celebrations, with protests with similar aims continuing to be held on 26 January under the names Invasion Day or Survival Day.

The Day of Mourning was organised by the Sydney-based Aborigines Progressive Association (APA), led by Jack Patten and William Ferguson, and was supported by William Cooper's Melbourne-based Australian Aborigines' League (AAL). Patten and Ferguson had published a series of policy demands earlier in the month. The protest on 26 January included a march through the streets of Sydney, beginning at Sydney Town Hall and ending at the Australian Hall. The attendees subsequently held a conference on Indigenous rights and unanimously passed a resolution condemning the "callous treatment of our people by the white man" and calling for "new laws for the education and care of Aborigines" and "a new policy which will raise our people to full citizen status and equality within the community".

Following the Day of Mourning, leading participants met with Prime Minister Joseph Lyons and Interior Minister John McEwen and pressed for further action in line with Patten and Ferguson's policy agenda. Their lobbying played a key role in the development of the New Deal for Aborigines, announced by McEwen later in 1938, which set out a pathway to full citizenship rights for Indigenous people contingent on cultural assimilation. The New Deal was welcomed by the APA but its implementation stalled and its recommendations took decades to achieve. The Day of Mourning also contributed to a surge in Indigenous activism, including the publication of the short-lived Australian Abo Call as the first national newspaper for Aboriginal Australians. The APA ultimately split into rival factions later in 1938 but the Day of Mourning participants continued to play a significant role in rights activism.

== Background ==
The Day of Mourning protest was organised by the Aborigines Progressive Association (APA), based in New South Wales and led by its founders Jack Patten and William Ferguson. The protest leaders also had support from the Australian Aborigines' League (AAL), based in Victoria and led by William Cooper. In 1888, the centenary of the arrival of the First Fleet, Aboriginal leaders had simply boycotted the Australia Day celebrations. However, this had been ignored by the media.

These groups had also sent petitions to the Australian and the British governments, in the early 1930s, for the recognition of Aboriginal civil rights (including Aboriginal representation in the Parliament of Australia), but they had been ignored or dismissed without serious attention, and each had refused to pass the petitions on to King George V.

As a result, a more proactive event was planned for the sesquicentenary, which the media and governments could not ignore. This was despite the recent experience of the New South Wales Police engaging in general intimidation of public meetings of such political organisations.

In early January 1938, a statement titled "Citizen Rights for Aborigines" was published by Patten and Ferguson in William Miles' nationalist magazine The Publicist. It was likely edited by writer P. R. Stephensen, who was honorary secretary of the Aboriginal Citizenship Committee, an organisation for non-Aboriginal supporters of the APA. Advertising and print materials for the conference were printed by The Publicist's printer, Stafford Printery, with their manifesto circulated to newspapers. Stephensen also interviewed Patten and Ferguson on his weekly radio programme. In the lead-up to the conference the APA also secured the support of prominent author Mary Gilmore.

== Conference and protest ==
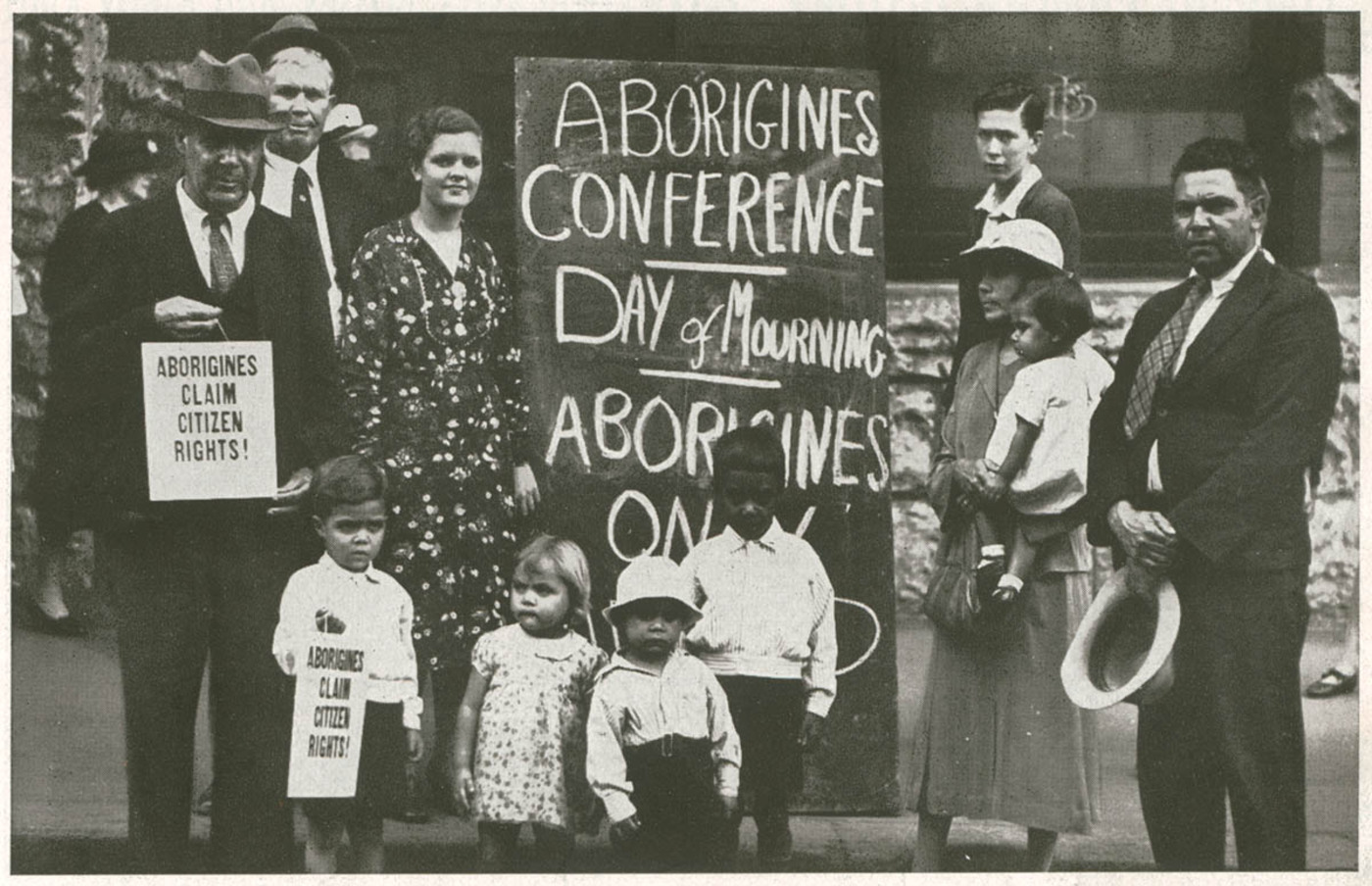
A blackboard displayed outside Australian Hall proclaims, "Day of Mourning", 1938

The day began with a march through the streets of Sydney, which was attended by both Aboriginal people and non-Indigenous supporters. The march began at the Sydney Town Hall and concluded at the major event on the day, the Day of Mourning Congress, a political meeting for Aboriginal people only. It attracted many major Aboriginal leaders, including Pearl Gibbs and Margaret Tucker.

The protesters had originally intended to hold the Congress in the Sydney Town Hall, but they were refused access, and instead held it at the nearby Australian Hall in Elizabeth Street. They were not allowed in through the front door and were told they could only enter through the rear door.

Congress was open to all Aboriginal people, and about 100 people attended, making it "the first national meeting of Aboriginal people for citizenship rights". The APA and AAL distributed a manifesto at the meeting, Aborigines Claim Citizens' Rights, produced by Patten and APA secretary William Ferguson. The manifesto opened with a declaration that "This festival of 150 years' so-called 'progress' in Australia commemorates also 150 years of misery and degradation imposed on the original native inhabitants by white invaders of this country."

Speeches at the conference were made by Patten, Ferguson, Gibbs and Tom Foster. Patten called for "ordinary rights and full equality with other Australians", also denouncing white supremacy and the "slavery under which our people live in the outback districts". Ferguson spoke against the differing legal treatment of Indigenous people based on blood quantum and the idea that citizenship status should depend on the degree of Aboriginal blood. Both Patten and Ferguson called for the abolition of the Aborigines' Protection Board in New South Wales, although Patten disagreed with Cooper's call to give Aboriginal people a reserved seat in the House of Representatives.

Ferguson also raised the issue of land rights, requesting "the right to own land that our fathers and mothers owned from time immemorial". He called for the government to make land grants to Indigenous people and establish agricultural education schemes, contrasting the lack of government assistance for Aboriginal people with the extensive assisted passage and settlement schemes available to white immigrants. He concluded that "all Aboriginal legislation today is intended to drive our people into the Aboriginal reserves, where there is no future for them, nothing but disheartenment"

=== Resolution ===
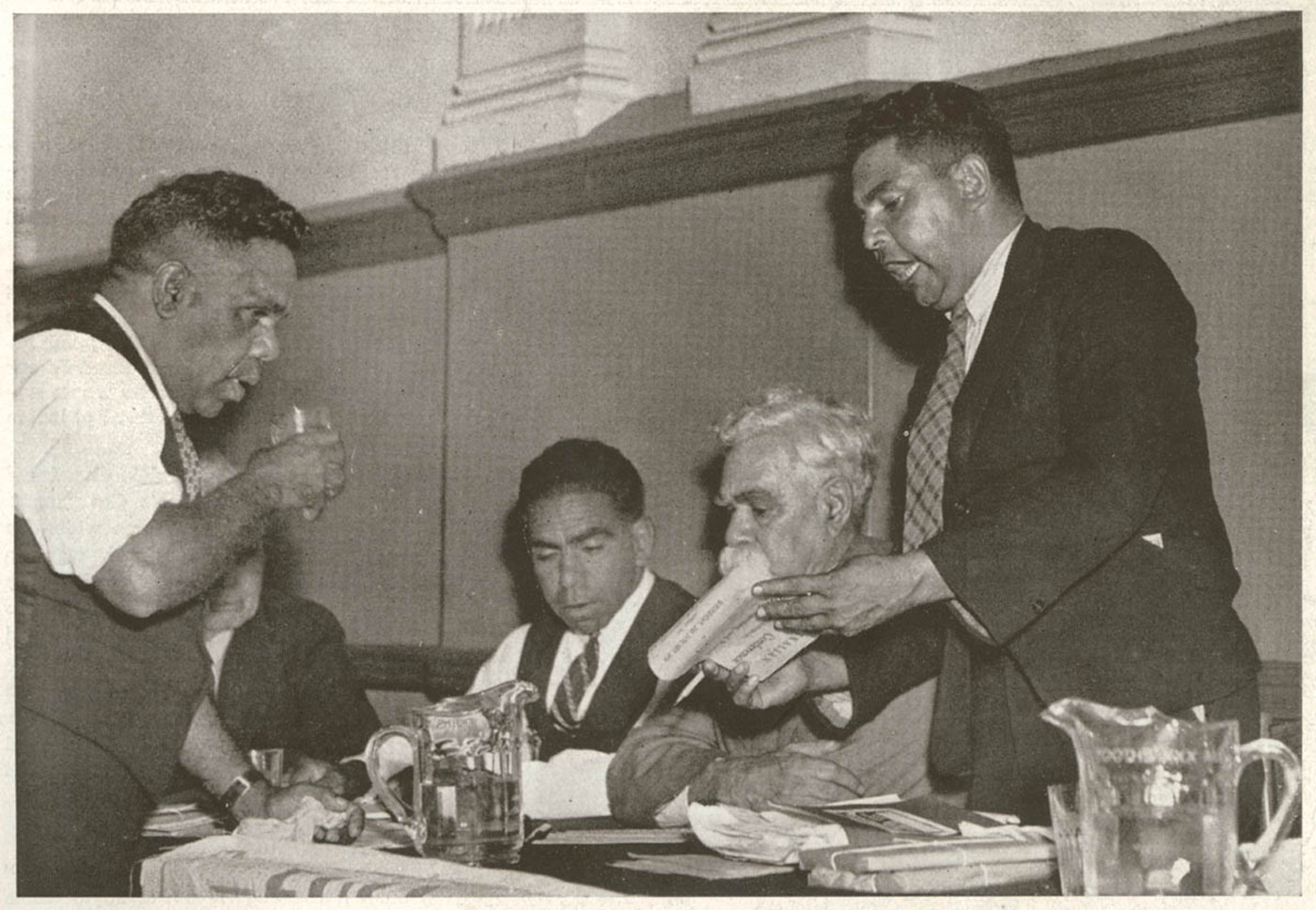
Patten (right) moving the resolution of protest, next to Cooper (seated)

At the Congress, the following resolution was passed unanimously:

WE, representing THE ABORIGINES OF AUSTRALIA, assembled in Conference at the Australian Hall, Sydney, on the 26th day of January, 1938, this being the 150th anniversary of the whitemen's seizure of our country, HEREBY MAKE PROTEST against the callous treatment of our people by the white men in the past 150 years, AND WE APPEAL to the Australian Nation to make new laws for the education and care of Aborigines, and for a new policy which will raise our people to FULL CITIZEN STATUS and EQUALITY WITHIN THE COMMUNITY.

=== Reaction to official celebrations ===
In order to celebrate Australia Day in 1938, the government of New South Wales had planned to reenact the arrival of the First Fleet in Port Jackson. However, all the Aboriginal political organisations in Sydney refused to participate. In response, the Government removed a group of Aboriginal men from an Aboriginal reserve in the west of the state and brought them to Sydney. The men were kept overnight in the stables at the police barracks in Redfern. On Australia Day, they were taken to a beach at Farm Cove, where they were told to run up the beach, to convey the impression that they were fleeing in fear from the First Fleet.

The reenactments attracted heavy criticism from the Day of Mourning protesters, who were not allowed to visit the men from the reserve when they were staying at Redfern. However, the Sydney media focused more on the fact that convicts had been excised from the reenactment.

== Outcomes and legacy ==
A 1987 review of the Day of Mourning by Aboriginal writers Jack Horner and Marcia Langton concluded that it was "a powerful symbol, but [...] brought about little change".

=== Deputations ===
On 31 January 1938, twenty of the conference delegates – including Patten, Ferguson, Gibbs and Foster – met in Sydney with Prime Minister Joseph Lyons, his wife Enid, and federal interior minister John McEwen, who was responsible for Aboriginal policy in the Northern Territory. Patten put forward a ten-point policy statement, which included a federal takeover of Indigenous affairs from state governments, the establishment of a standalone Department of Aboriginal Affairs, the appointment of an advisory board with Indigenous members, and full rights of citizenship and racial equality for all Indigenous people. He also lobbied for the federal government to make urgent grants to the states to be used for the basic needs of Indigenous people. In response, Lyons noted that section 51(xxvi) of the constitution would need to be amended to bring the changes about and McEwen promised to convene a conference of state ministers to discuss the matter.

An APA delegation also met with George Gollan, a minister without portfolio in the New South Wales state government who had an interest in Indigenous policy. Gollan advised New South Wales premier Bertram Stevens that the Board for the Protection of Aborigines should be reorganised along the lines envisaged by the APA. Stevens initially accepted Gollan's recommendations, but changed his mind after consultation with anthropologists.

=== Effect on government policy ===
In February 1938, following the meeting in Sydney, McEwen secured the approval of federal cabinet to develop an official government policy on Aboriginal affairs in the Northern Territory. He announced the New Deal for Aborigines in December 1938, a landmark policy statement (released as a white paper in February 1939) which provided a pathway to full citizenship rights for Indigenous people consequent on a process of cultural assimilation. The white paper stated that the "final objective" of government policy on Aboriginal people:

[...] should be the raising of their status so as to entitle them by right and by qualification to the ordinary rights of citizenship and enable them and help them to share with us the opportunities that are available in their own native land.

The announcement of the New Deal was "enthusiastically received" by the AAL and APA, although it did not cover all points of Patten's policy statement. Initially steps towards its implementation included the creation of a Native Affairs branch within the Department of the Interior, based in Darwin, and the abolition of the post of Chief Protector of Aborigines in the Northern Territory. However, its implementation soon stalled as a result of government changes and the outbreak of World War II.

=== Effect on indigenous activism ===
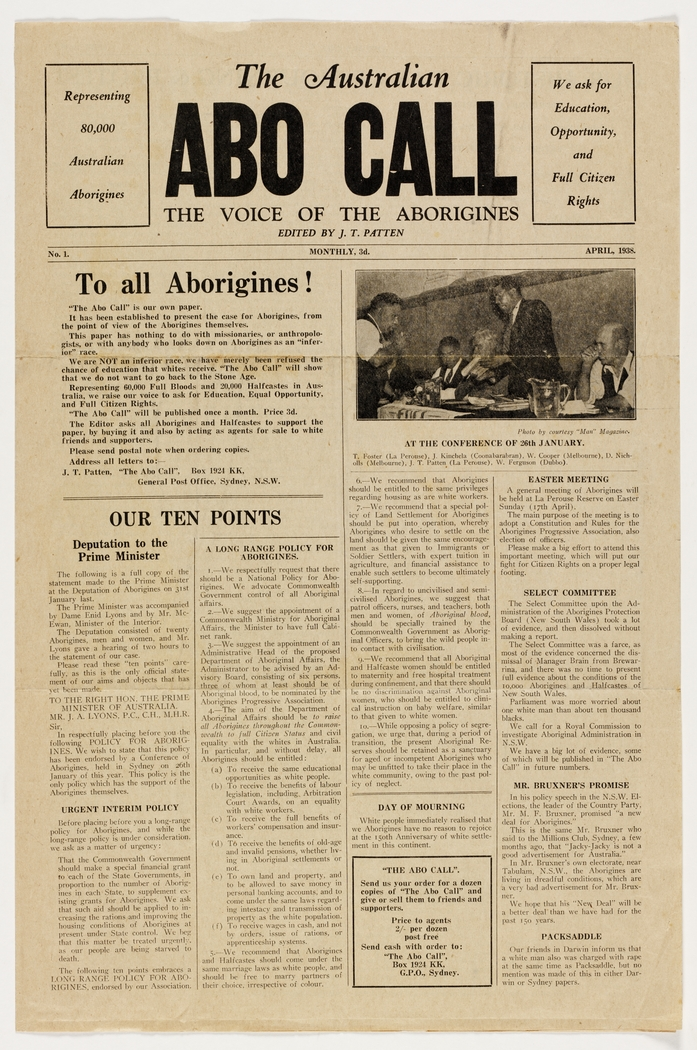
Front page of the first edition of The Australian Abo Call

In April 1938, The Australian Abo Call was launched as a national newspaper for Aboriginal readers, with Patten as editor continuing to publicise the issues and policy agenda raised at the Day of Mourning. The newspaper "proclaimed itself 'the voice of the Aborigines' and continued to demand for rights and equality for Aboriginal people". It reported on "the poor living conditions faced by many Aboriginal people and attempted to dispel the notion of peaceful European colonisation". The Abo Call was ultimately short-lived and ceased publication in September 1938.

The unity between Aboriginal rights groups and their leaders displayed at the Day of Mourning was relatively short-lived, with an internal split developing in the APA between followers of Ferguson and Patten. A meeting of the APA in April 1938 to discuss a new constitution ended in "a shouting match" between Ferguson and Patten, and their factions subsequently held rival annual meetings and developed separate policy statements. The APA notionally remained active until 1944 and an organisation of the same name was established in the early 1960s by Bert Groves and Pearl Gibbs, intended as a revival of the first APA. The AAL also continued into the 1960s under the leadership of Doug Nicholls and Bill Onus, following Cooper's death in 1941.

=== Commemorations ===
In March 1966, the APA organised a Day of Mourning protest, for which Isobelle Mary Ferguson, daughter of Bill Ferguson, was the social convenor.

In 1998, a reenactment of the original Day of Mourning was held to commemorate the 60th anniversary of the protest. About 400 protesters marched in silence along the original route of the march. Descendants of the original protesters read their speeches, and the ten main grievances in the Congress' manifesto were re-affirmed. The reenactment was accompanied by a campaign to protect the Australian Hall, the location of the 1938 Congress. The Government of New South Wales had placed a conservation order on it, but exceptions to the order allowed everything but the façade to be demolished. The building is now permanently protected.

In recent years, National Sorry Day on 26 May, and counter-protests held on 26 January (Australia Day), such as Invasion Day and Survival Day, have been more prominently commemorated in Australia.

== See also ==
- National Sorry Day
