= Cummeragunja Reserve =

Former Australian Aboriginal reserve in New South Wales, Australia

Coordinates: 36.0279°S 144.9574°E

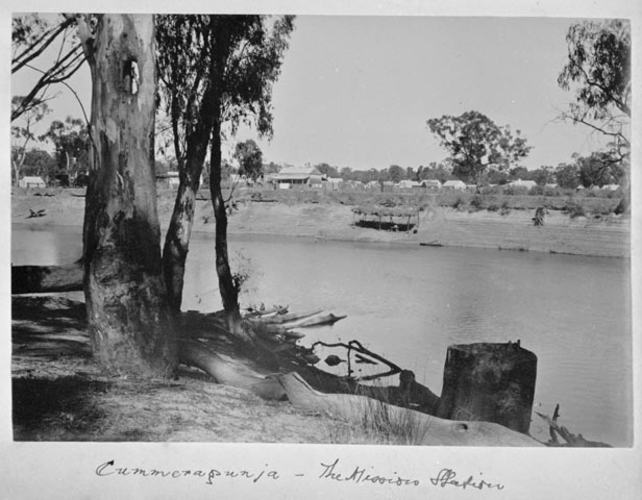
Cummeragunja reserve viewed from across the Murray, 1893

Cummeragunja Reserve or Cummeragunja Station, alternatively spelt Coomeroogunja, Coomeragunja, Cumeroogunga and Cummerguja, was a settlement on the New South Wales side of the Murray River, on the Victorian border near Barmah. It was also called Cumeroogunga Mission, although it was not run by missionaries. The people were mostly Yorta Yorta.

It was established between 1882 and 1888 when dissatisfied residents of Maloga Mission moved 5 miles (8.0 km) upriver to escape the authoritarian discipline there under its founder, Daniel Matthews. The mission buildings were re-built on the new site, and the teacher, Thomas Shadrach James, moved too, but Matthews stayed on at Maloga. The new station became a thriving community by the turn of the century, but over time its status changed as the New South Wales Government assumed varying degrees of control. Records list it as a group of four Aboriginal reserves spanning the years 1883 to 1964, but its status changed over this period, with differing levels of control by the government. It is known for being the site of a protest known as the Cummeragunja walk-off in 1939, with residents leaving the reserve to cross the river in protest at poor conditions and treatment.

In March 1984 the newly created Yorta Yorta Land Council took possession of the land. Many Aboriginal families still live on Cummeragunja.

== Name ==
The name of the settlement referred to today as Cummeragunja has been recorded as Cumeroogunya and other variations such as Coomeragunja, Cumeroogunga and Cummerguja.

== History ==
Records show the Cumeroogunya Aboriginal reserve in the Parish of Bama, County of Cadell on a total of 2,600 acres (1,100 ha), consisting of four reserves: the main one existed from 9 April 1883 to 24 December 1964, while three smaller ones have starting dates in 1893, 1899 and 1900.

=== Establishment ===
Most of the people who lived on the Cummeragunja Reserve were Yorta Yorta people. The original residents moved there from Maloga Mission, 4 miles (6.4 km) away, where they had grown tired of the strict religious lifestyle and the authoritarian style of its founder, Daniel Matthews.

In April 1881, 42 of the Yorta Yorta men living at the Maloga Mission wrote a petition to the Governor of New South Wales, Augustus Loftus, requesting land. Daniel Matthews took the petition to Sydney on their behalf and it was published in the Sydney Morning Herald on 2 July 1881 and the Daily Telegraph on 5 July 1881, the same day that it was presented to the governor.

In July 1887, the Governor of New South Wales, Lord Carrington, visited Moama, where he was presented with a petition by Maloga residents requesting Queen Victoria grant the community land. The petition was signed by Robert Cooper, Samson Barber, Aaron Atkinson, Hughy Anderson, John Cooper, Edgar Atkinson, Whyman McLean, John Atkinson (his mark), William Cooper, George Middleton, Edward Joachim (his mark). An article in the Riverine Herald tells of the petition, presented to a Mr Burns, "when here some months ago with Lord Carrington". It prints a response from the Minister of Lands acceding to the request that "part of the reserve [would] be subdivided into suitable areas for settlement of individual aborigines", dated 20 March 1888.

A property of 1,800 acres (7.3 km^{2}) was acquired from the government of the Colony of New South Wales, and the entire village was moved from Maloga in 1888, with the name Coomerugunja given to it by a superintendent appointed by the New South Wales Aborigines Protection Association.

Matthews' connection with the Aborigines Protection Association ceased in April 1888, when the residents moved. According to his wife Janet, he continued to be "engaged in work on behalf of the blacks"; the couple stayed on at Maloga Mission, doing their "particular work", and were looking to establish a new mission at Bribie Island after the residents had left (which never came to pass).

Thomas Shadrach James continued as teacher at the new location, and was praised as a dedicated teacher by Matthews' son, John Kerr Matthews, and was said to have taught his Aboriginal students well, many of whom went on to be activists.

The "Cumeroogunga Mission Church, removed from Mologa" was reported to have reopened for worship on Easter Monday in 1889. At Cummeragunja Station, they established a farm with the aim of communal self-sufficiency. In the early years, the residents of Cummeragunja shaped most of the land into a productive farm, producing wheat, wool and dairy products,

The NSW Aborigines Protection Association administered the station from its beginnings until 1892 (subsidised by the government), when their funds ran dry and management was handed over to the government's Board for the Protection of Aborigines.

=== 20th century ===
In 1907 the blocks were revoked and later leased out to white farmers.

The Aborigines Protection Act 1909 gave the government greater control, and in 1915, after the local farmers' committee was abolished and amendments to the Act gave the New South Wales Board for the Protection of Aborigines even wider powers, the Board took greater control of Cummeragunja and its residents. Residents were subjected to confining and restrictive conditions, and the managers of the Reserve had the power to remove residents for misconduct, to in order to make them earn their living elsewhere. All the funds raised from the farm went to the Board, which "rewarded" workers by doling out inadequate and unhealthy rations. The 1915 Amendments had given the Board powers to remove children from their families, which they did. The girls were often placed in domestic service, or the Cootamundra Girls' Home for training as domestic servants, in particular the "half-caste" children.

The Board took all profits earned by the Station, and the community was neglected. Poor sanitation, inadequate housing and lack of clean water led to illness such as from tuberculosis and whooping cough, which especially affected the elderly and young, leading to deaths. By the 1930s conditions had drastically deteriorated. Residents were confined to the station and many of their relatives were forced away. Decent rations and supplies were lacking and residents were forced to share blankets and live in rag huts. Station manager, Arthur McQuiggan, bullied and punished residents if they complained.

In May 1938, anthropologists Joseph Birdsell and Norman Tindale visited Cummeragunja. The then teacher, Thomas Austin, considered himself an expert on Aboriginal people, who had already passed on his ideas to Sydney anthropologist A.P. Elkin. Although they were not given the right to halt the study, members of the community, who were aware of their rights and aired their grievances, were listened to by Tindale and Birdsell. Years later, Tindale would use some of the issues at Cummeragunja to support his theory that while mixed-race Aboriginal people ("half-castes") could be assimilated successfully, the reserve system was not successful in this aim, citing the unrest at Cummeragunja in his report. The scientists' visit did have one positive outcome: they created an archive of photographs and accounts which are valued by descendants of Cummeragunja residents.

==== 1939 Cummeragunja walk-off ====
After some residents sent a telegram to former resident and activist Jack Patten and he was arrested when trying to address them, on 6 February 1939, about 170 residents walked off the mission in protest at their treatment, settling across the river, to relocate in Victoria, in camps on the riverbanks. Margaret Tucker MBE and Geraldine Briggs AO were among the most prominent protesters.

This protest became known as the Cummeragunja walk-off, and was the first mass strike of Indigenous people in Australia, and was to inspire later movements and protests.

Many of the participants in the walk-off settled in northern Victoria, including Barmah, Echuca, Mooroopna and Shepparton.

==== Land taken after WWII ====
Following World War II, the Government handed parcels of land at Cummeragunja and other Aboriginal reserves over to white Australian returned servicemen under the Soldier Settlement Scheme. Indigenous returned servicemen were not eligible for the scheme, so even those from Cummeragunja who had served in the war were not rewarded in this way.

==== 1953: Station closure ====
In 1953, Cummeragunja's status as a station was ended, and it was reduced to the status of Aboriginal reserve. Only a few residents remained, but they persisted in claiming the right to begin farming again. Cummeragunga Pty Ltd was registered in 1965.

In 1956, ahead of the visit of Queen Elizabeth II for the 1956 Melbourne Olympics, the remaining families were moved to 10 especially built houses at an area known as Rumbalara. The Rumbalara Aboriginal Co-operative was established in 1980, and runs health services for the community. There is also a Rumbalara Football Netball Club. and on 13 August 2008 thousands of people gathered so the government can apologise for the stolen generation.

=== 1984: Handover ===
On 9 March 1984 ownership of the land was passed to the newly created Yorta Yorta Local Aboriginal Land Council.

== Application for heritage listing ==
As of 2025 Heritage NSW is in discussions with the council about potential nomination for listing on the New South Wales State Heritage Register. The schoolhouse and cemetery are of particular interest.

== Current governance ==
Many Aboriginal families still live on Cummeragunja; around 100 people, including 20 children, as of 2025. Ancestral connections determine residency rights in the village. There are 23 houses, but six are abandoned and in need of repair.

As of 2025, Cummeragunja is owned and managed by the independent body Cummeragunja Local Aboriginal Land Council (CLALC) under the umbrella organisation of the NSW Aboriginal Land Council. CLALC receives an annual grant of around $161,000 from NSW Aboriginal Land Council, from the fund established under the state's Aboriginal Land Rights Act 1983. Homes are owned by CLALC and rented out to the residents. According to respected Yorta Yorta elder Colin Walker, housing and infrastructure has not been properly maintained in Cummeragunja, so many residents have stopped paying rent. Members of the CLALC say that there is simply not enough money to pay for all of the repairs needed.

== Notable people from Cummeragunja ==
- Jack Charles, actor and co-founder of Australia's first Indigenous theatre group, Nindethana, in Melbourne
- Lynch Cooper, sprinter, winner of the Stawell Gift
- William Cooper, founder of the Australian Aborigines League
- Jimmy Little, musician, singer, songwriter and guitarist
- Sir Douglas Nicholls, leading Australian rules footballer, Churches of Christ pastor, and Governor of South Australia
- Gladys Nicholls, activist, wife of Douglas
- Hyllus Maris, writer and activist
- Bill Onus, political activist, entrepreneur, and actor/performer
- Jack Patten, founder of the Aborigines Progressive Association and organiser of the 1938 Day of Mourning in NSW
- The Sapphires, singing group on which the international film The Sapphires (film) and Australian play The Sapphires (play) was based
- Margaret Tucker, co-founder of the Australian Aborigines' League and author of If Everyone Cared (1977), one of the first autobiographies to deal with the experience of the Stolen Generations
- Margaret Wirrpanda, niece of Margaret Tucker, activist

== See also ==
- List of Aboriginal missions in New South Wales
- 1901 - Eaglehawk FC & Cummeragunga FC team photos
