= Urban Theatre Projects =

Australian theatre company

Urban Theatre Projects (Utp)
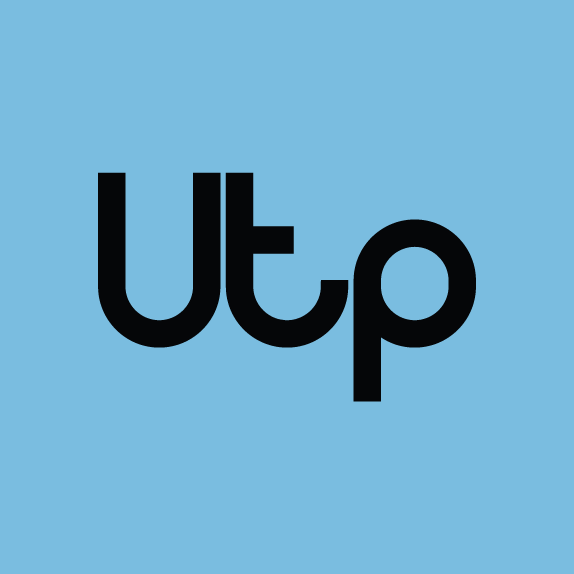
- Utp's current logo (2020)
- Formerly: Cartwheel Theatre (1979); The Really Interesting Gypsies (1980); Death Defying Theatre (1981)
- Industry: Art; theatre; performance art
- Founded: 1979
- Founders: Paul Brown; Alice Spizzo; Christine Sammers; Kim Spinks
- Headquarters: 5 Olympic Parade, Bankstown NSW 2200, Bankstown, New South Wales, Australia
- Key people: Dr Jessica Olivieri (CEO/Artistic Director), Dr Robert Lang (Chair)
- Services: Artistic Theatre Production
- Website: utp.org.au

Urban Theatre Projects (Utp), previously known as Death Defying Theatre (DDT), is a theatre company based in Bankstown Sydney, Australia.

== Early history ==
=== 1979–1989 ===
The organisation started as a street theatre company in 1979 by graduates of the University of New South Wales. The project was founded by Paul Brown, Alice Spizzo, Christine Sammers, and Kim Spinks. Initially, their office was located in the Village Church Centre (VCC) in the Paddington area of the Eastern Suburbs. The company mostly rehearsed outdoors in the nearby Centennial Park. In the late 1980s, the group was based in the Bondi Pavilion. In 1991, the group moved from Eastern Sydney to the Auburn area of Western Sydney, and in 1997, the group changed its name to Urban Theatre Projects.

The group initially emphasized political theatre. The group was instrumental in moderating what constituted theatre practice in Australia in the 1980s. As a way of reaching a new constituency in its early years, a collective of young performance-makers made work on the streets, later shifting to art in working life processes, placing artists in working sites such as mining towns (Coal Town, 1984) and factories (Behind the Seams, 1988).

=== 1990–2000 ===
In the early 1990s the company moved to Western Sydney, where communities became the performers as well as an essential part of the devising process, such as Café Hakawati (1991), a collaboration with Arabic-speaking communities at the time of the first Gulf War. Utp began creating site-specific intimate spectacles, intersecting community cultural development and contemporary performance practice. Under the artistic direction of Fiona Winning and John Baylis, notable works included Hip Hopera (1995), Trackwork (1997), Speed St (1999) and Asylum (2001).

== Current ==
Under Alicia Talbot's Artistic Directorship (2001–2012) the Company premiered 4 large-scale works as part of The Sydney Festival; Back Home (2006), The Last Highway (2008), The Fence (2010) and most recently Buried City (2012), a co-production with Sydney Festival and Belvoir Street Theatre.

Since 2014, Artistic director Rosie Dennis significantly increased the company's program, expanding to digital platforms (producing the company's first film Bre & Back), and shifting to a curatorial model while maintaining an artist-led culture and branding work. Her works as Director include: Home Country (Sydney Festival 2017), Simple Infinity (2016), One Day for Peace (2015), My Radio Heart (2014) and Life As We Know It (2013), while her work as Curator includes BANKSTOWN:LIVE (Sydney Festival 2015), One Day for Peace (2016), Blak Box (2018), Talk Show (2018) and RIGHT HERE. RIGHT NOW. (2018).

== Members ==
Paul Brown, one of the group's co-founders, later went on to become a professor of earth sciences at the University of New South Wales.

Julia Cotton, the former Head of Movement Studies at the National Institute of Dramatic Art (NIDA), worked on productions for the group.

Dr Robert Lang, a member of the Fellow of Australian Institute of Company Directors, current chair person for Utp.
