= Abo Call =

First Aboriginal-focused publication in Australia

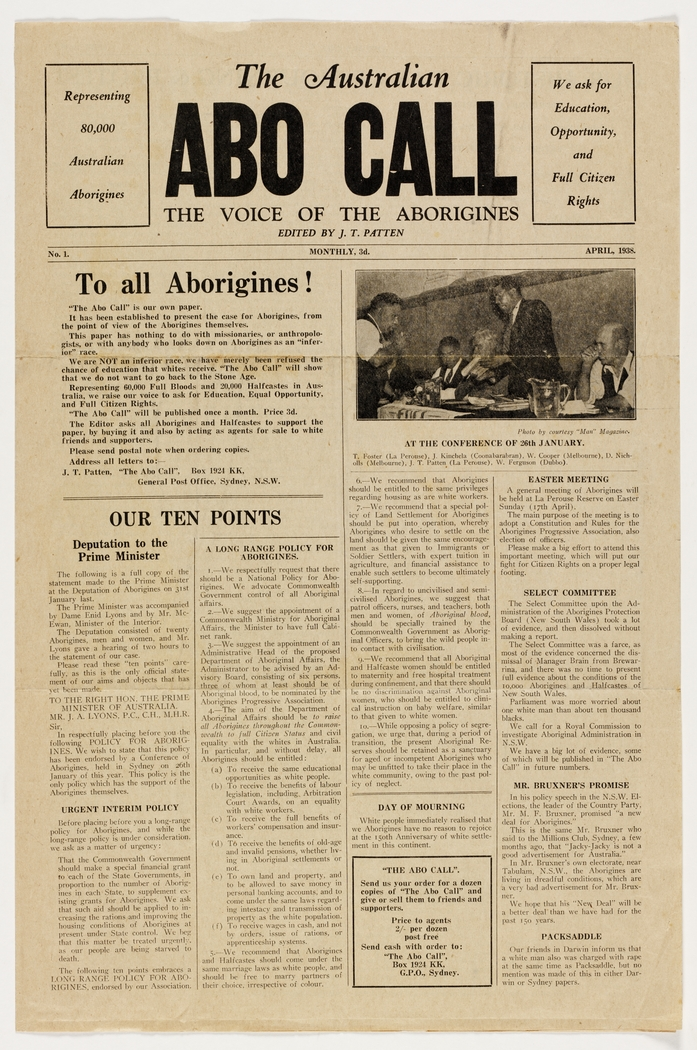
Front page of The Australian Abo Call April 1938

The Australian Abo Call, also known simply as Abo Call, was the first Aboriginal-focused publication printed in Australia, with all issues published in 1938.

== History ==
There was a total of six issues of The Australian Abo Call, all published between April and September 1938. It was the first publication in Australia focused solely on Aboriginal issues and politics.

The paper was written and edited by John (Jack) Patten, who co-founded of the Aborigines Progressive Association (APA) in 1937, and featured news gathered by Patten on his travels through eastern Australia, as well as from correspondents nationwide. The newspaper's tagline was "The Voice of the Aborigines".

Stephensen was known as a writer and publisher, and was honorary secretary of the Aboriginal Citizenship Committee, a support group of the APA, but was also known for turning to pro-Fascist, anti-Semitic, and anti-Communist views in his magazine The Publicist which he founded in 1936.

Abo Call closed down after six months of publication, due to lack of funds.

== Archives ==
Abo Call is available online through Trove, a service hosted at the National Library of Australia which allows access to historic Australian periodicals and newspapers.

The State Library of New South Wales holds the six issues that were published, among Percy Reginald Stephensen's papers.

== Legacy ==
Marcia Langton later wrote that she and the other founders of the monthly paper Koori Bina at Black Women's Action in 1976 had been inspired by Abo Call.

== See also ==
- List of newspapers in Australia
