= Douglas Nicholls =

Governor of South Australia (1976–77)

Sir Douglas Nicholls KCVO OBE
- Douglas Nicholas, c.1975

28th Governor of South Australia
- In office 1 December 1976 – 30 April 1977
- Monarch: Elizabeth II
- Premier: Don Dunstan
- Preceded by: Sir Mark Oliphant
- Succeeded by: Sir Keith Seaman

Personal details
- Born: Douglas Ralph Nicholls; 9 December 1906 Cummeragunja Reserve, New South Wales, Australia
- Died: 4 June 1988 (aged 81) Mooroopna, Victoria, Australia
- Spouse: Gladys Nicholls (m. 1942; died 1981)
- Profession: Pastor, footballer, activist

Sir Douglas Ralph Nicholls KCVO OBE (9 December 1906 – 4 June 1988) was a prominent Aboriginal Australian from the Yorta Yorta people who served as the 28th governor of South Australia from 1976 to 1977. He was a professional athlete, pastor of the Churches of Christ and church planter, ceremonial officer and a pioneer of Australian reconciliation.

Nicholls was the first Aboriginal Australian to be knighted when he was appointed Knight Bachelor in 1972 (he was subsequently appointed a Knight Commander of the Royal Victorian Order in 1977). He was also the first—and as of 2026 the only—Indigenous Australian to be appointed to vice-regal office, serving as Governor of South Australia from 1 December 1976 until his resignation on 30 April 1977 due to poor health.

== Early life ==
Nicholls was born on 9 December 1906 on the Cummeragunja Reserve in New South Wales. He was the youngest of five children born to Herbert Nicholls and Florence Atkinson. His maternal grandfather was Aaron Atkinson, who was the half-brother of William Cooper.

Schooling at Nicholls's mission was provided to Grade 3 standard and strict religious principles were emphasised. When he was eight, he saw his 16-year-old sister Hilda forcibly taken from his family by the police and taken to the Cootamundra Domestic Training Home for Aboriginal Girls where she was trained to become a domestic servant.

At 13 Nicholls worked with his uncle as a tar boy and general hand on sheep stations, and he lived with the shearers. He worked hard and had a cheerful disposition. This annoyed one of the shearers so much that he challenged Nicholls to a fight, with the loser to hand over one week's pay (30 shillings – $3). After six rounds, the shearer who challenged him conceded defeat.

== Sporting career ==
Football career

Personal information
- Original team: Tongala
- Height: 157 cm (5 ft 2 in)
- Weight: 65 kg (143 lb)

Playing career
Years	Club	Games (Goals)
1927–1931	Northcote	
1932–1937	Fitzroy	54 (2)
1937–1938	Northcote	

Representative team honours
Years	Team	Games (Goals)
1935	Victoria	4 (0)

Coaching career
Years	Club	Games (W–L–D)
1947	Northcote	20 (4–16–0)

Career highlights
- VFA premiership player: 1929

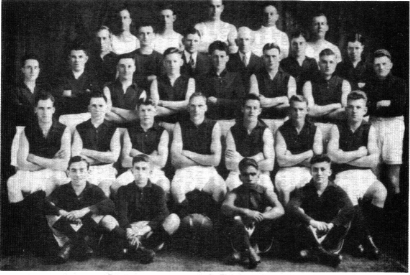
Northcote Football Club's 1929 premiership side; Doug Nicholls second from right, front row

Nicholls played Australian rules football. After playing in the Goulburn Valley for Tongala, Nicholls tried out for VFL clubs North Melbourne and Carlton before the 1927 season. He played some seconds matches for Carlton but did not play a senior game.

Nicholls subsequently joined the Northcote Football Club in the VFA, and became a regular in the Northcote team by 1929. He made his name as an energetic and speedy wingman, capable of spectacular feats, and came to be regarded as the best wingman in the VFA at the time. At 5 ft 2 in (157 cm), he was one of the shortest players in the game. He was a member of Northcote's 1929 premiership team, and finished third in the Recorder Cup voting in 1931, his final season with Northcote.

In 1932, Nicholls joined the Fitzroy Football Club in the VFL and, in 1935, he was the first Aboriginal player to be selected to play for the Victorian interstate team, ultimately playing four interstate games. He played a total of six seasons for Fitzroy, before returning to Northcote in 1938. Knee injuries forced him to retire in 1939. He returned to Northcote as non-playing coach in 1947. Nicholls won Fitzroy's Reserves best and fairest award in 1937.

During his career, particularly in the early years, Nicholls was subjected to on-field taunts or ostracised by his team-mates due to his colour. Nevertheless, he became a popular player among spectators; and, upon joining Fitzroy, when he was initially sitting by himself in the change rooms, due to ostracism, he was befriended by Haydn Bunton, Sr., who ensured he was made welcome in the team.

Like his close relative Lynch Cooper, Nicholls was also a very capable sprinter. He competed in professional races around Victoria during the athletics season and. in 1928, he won both the Nyah and Warracknabeal Gifts. Following that, organisers paid him an appearance fee, board and expenses to enter races. He was the inaugural chairman of the National Aboriginal Sports Foundation.

Playing football provided employment during the winter. To earn a living during the rest of the year, he boxed with Jimmy Sharman's Boxing Troupe, a travelling sideshow in which Sharman offered his fighters for challenge against all comers.

During World War II, Nicholls, an adept boomerang thrower, taught the skill to members of the United States military, with a photograph depicting that in the Australian War Memorial archives. He also organised and captained Aboriginal teams in football matches used for patriotic fund-raising games during the war, many of which were played against Northcote.

== Road to the 1967 referendum ==
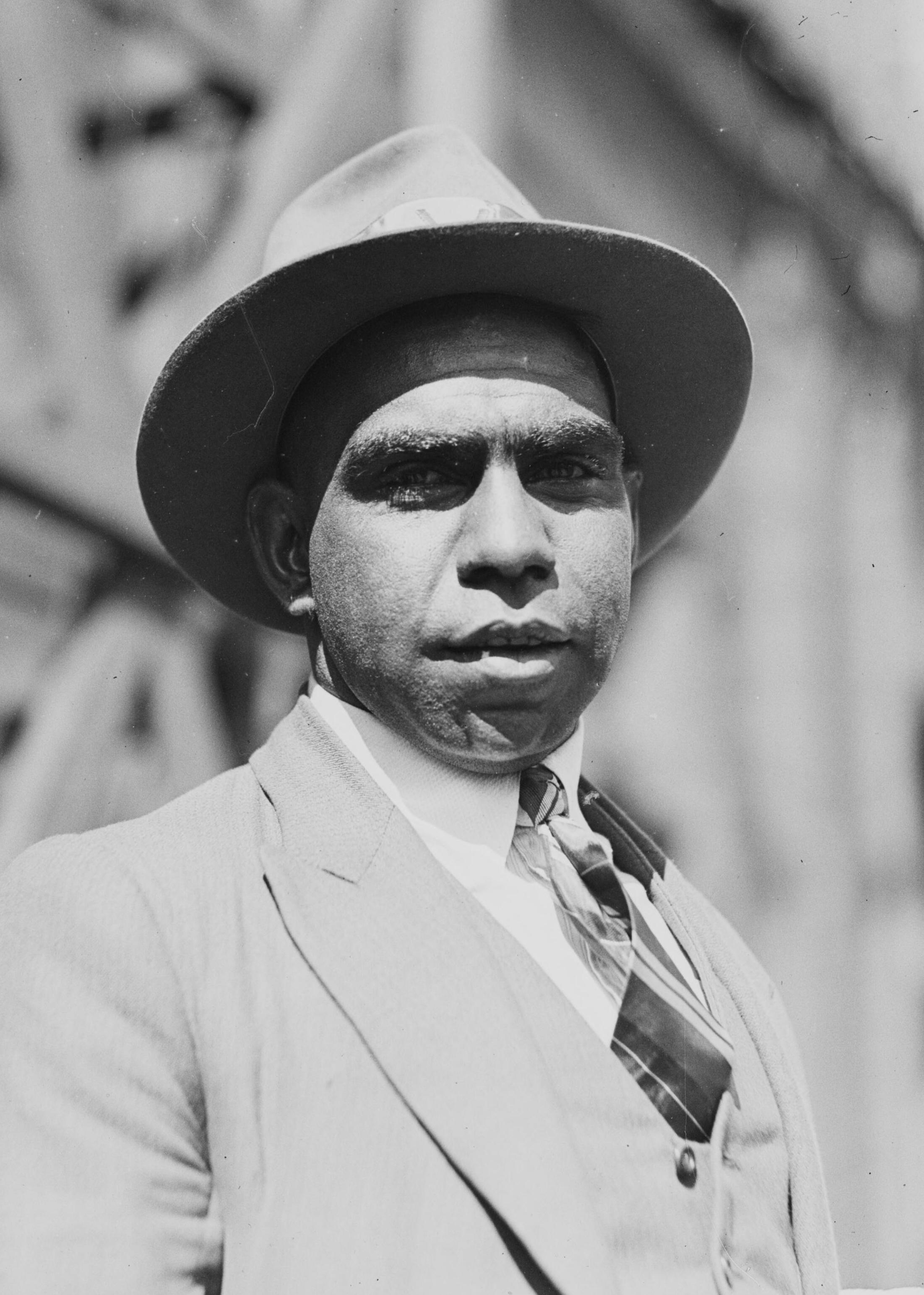
Nicholls in 1931

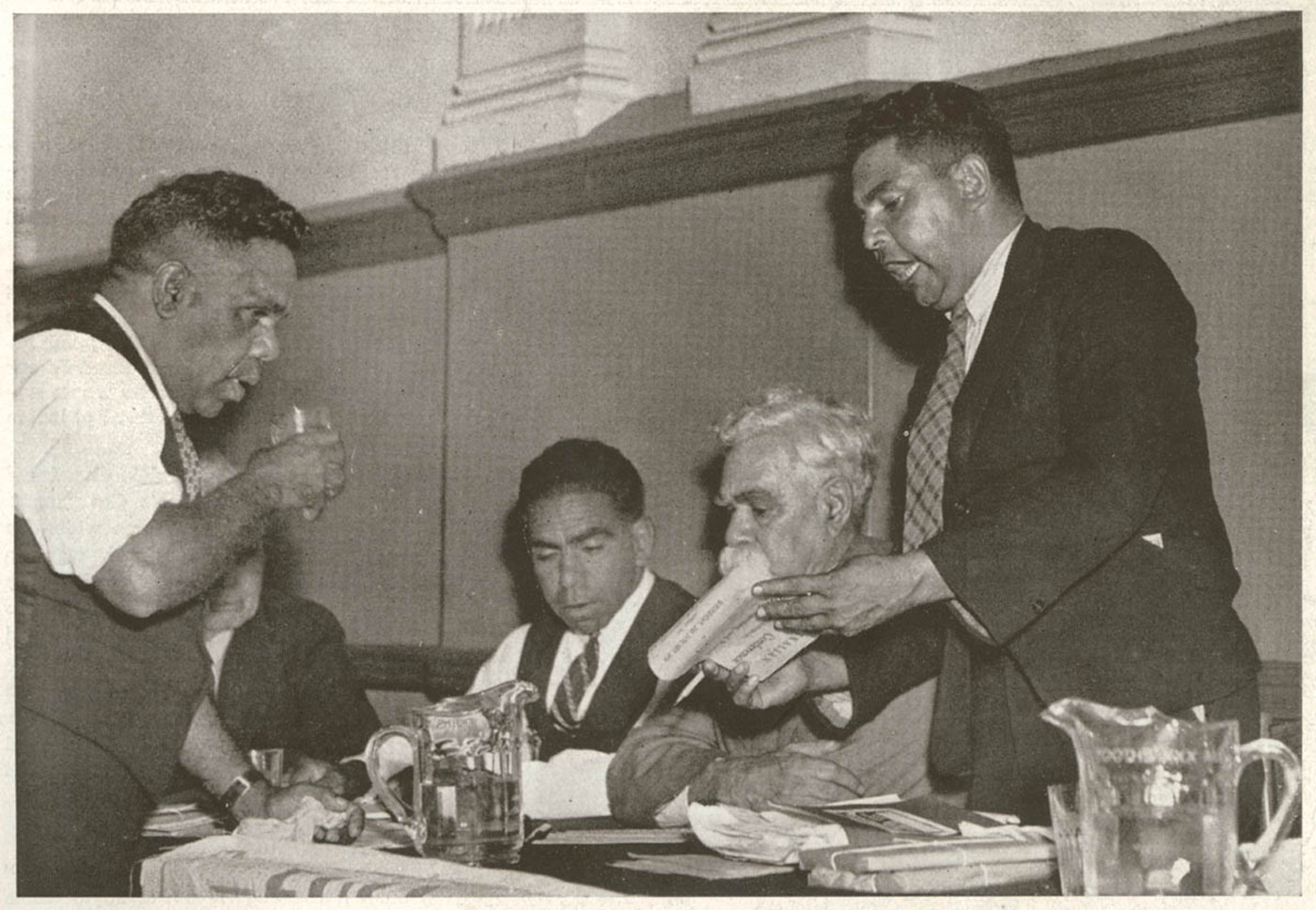
Tom Foster, Jack Kinchela (obscured), Nicholls, William Cooper and Jack Patten reading the resolution of the Aborigines Progressive Association at the All Australian Aboriginal Conference and Day of Mourning at Australian Hall, Sydney, on 26 January 1938

William Cooper, an uncle to Nicholls, mentored him in leadership, eventually placing him as the secretary of the Australian Aborigines' League. It was a founding principle of the League that Aboriginal Affairs was made a Federal matter, which would require a change in the Constitution of Australia, which could only be effected by a referendum. As early as February 1935 Cooper, Nicholls and others were lobbying Members of Parliament, such as Thomas Paterson, the Commonwealth minister for the interior on this issue. It gained national attention when Nicholls, leveraging his profile as a nationally famous athlete, participated in the Day of Mourning protest for Aborigines held in Sydney on 26 January 1938, where Indigenous leaders from across the country made the demand to change the Constitution. The proposed resolution was:

WE, representing THE ABORIGINES OF AUSTRALIA, assembled in conference at the Australian Hall, Sydney, on the 26th day of January, 1938, this being the 150th Anniversary of the Whiteman's seizure of our country, HEREBY MAKE PROTEST against the callous treatment of our people by the whitemen during the past 150 years, AND WE APPEAL to the Australian nation of today to make new laws for the education and care of Aborigines, we ask for a new policy which will raise our people TO FULL CITIZEN STATUS and EQUALITY WITHIN THE COMMUNITY.

Doug Nicholls rose to support the resolution on behalf of the Victorian Aborigines League that day, saying:

On behalf of Victorian Aborigines I want to say that we support this resolution in every way. The public does not realise what our people have suffered for 150 years. Aboriginal girls have been sent to Aboriginal Reserves and have not been given any opportunity to improve themselves. Their treatment has been disgusting. The white people have done nothing for us whatever. Put on Reserves, with no proper education, how can Aborigines take their place as equals with whites? Now is our chance to have things altered. We must fight our very hardest in this cause. After 150 years our people are still bossed and influenced by white people. I know that we could proudly hold our own with others if given the chance. Do not let us forget, also, those of our own people who are still in a primitive state. It is for them that we should try to do something. We should all work in co-operation for the progress of Aborigines throughout the Commonwealth.

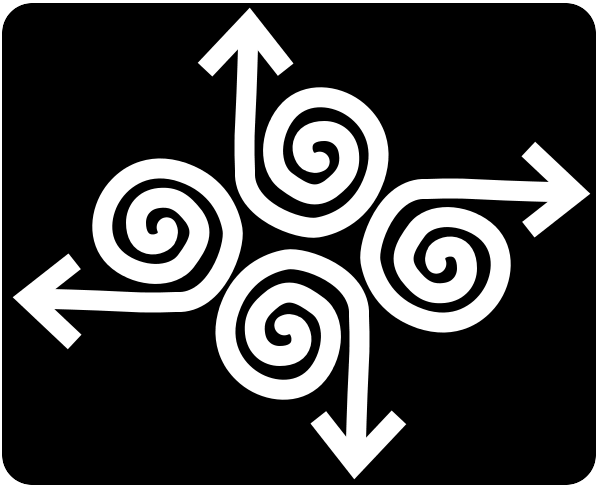
Nicholls was one of the founders of the Federal Council for the Advancement of Aborigines and Torres Strait Islanders (FCAATSI)

The movement took 30 years to coalesce and achieve anything like its stated goal, but it soon made its focus the Constitution of Australia which, in its original form, prevented the Commonwealth from making any law that would benefit the Aboriginal people. In 1949, a letter written by Nicholls prompted a Labor MP, Kim Beazley Sr., to write to the prime minister, Ben Chifley, asking him to explore how the Constitution could be amended. In 1957, Jessie Street approached Nicholls about bringing in the Victorian Aborigines Advancement League to form a federal council to campaign for Aboriginal affairs to become a federal matter – this would become the Federal Council for the Advancement of Aborigines and Torres Strait Islanders (FCAATSI). Its early work involved drafting and collecting petitions, from suburbs and town centres from across the country. By 1962, they had achieved 100,000 signatures with the stated goal of 250,000 signatures. The movement supporting a change to the constitution, which removed the block on the federal government making laws regarding Aboriginal people, soon became known as the "yes" campaign.

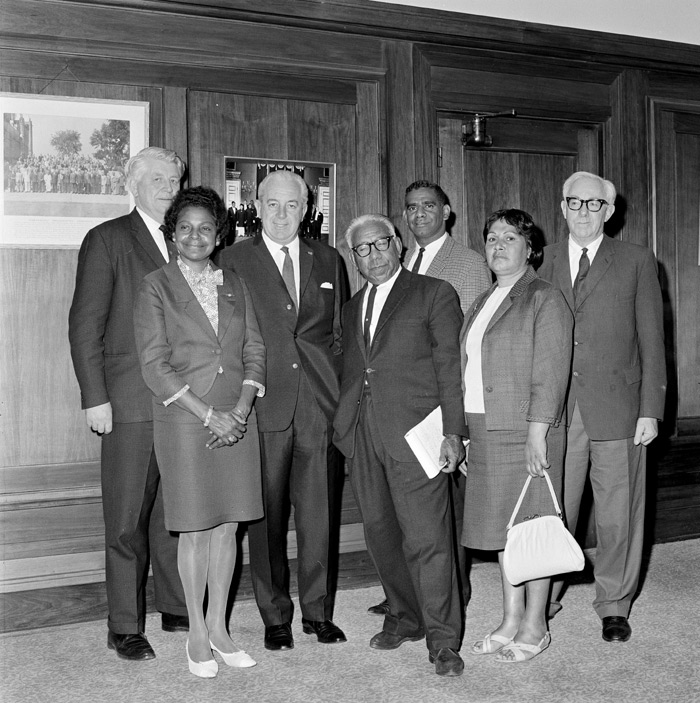
Nicholls in a meeting with Prime Minister Harold Holt, three months before the 1967 referendum. With him are (l-r): MP Gordon Bryant, Faith Bandler, Holt, Nicholls, Burnum Burnum, Winnie Branson and Bill Wentworth

Winnie Branson, who became the first South Australian state secretary of FCAATSI in 1967, along with Nicholls and other FCAATSI members Faith Bandler and Burnum Burnum, met with Prime Minister Harold Holt and MPs Gordon Bryant and William Wentworth in Canberra in February 1967 to advocate for the cause.

FCAATSI would later become the central lobby group who were able to interface with the Federal Government. During this time Nicholls was known to have met and negotiated with prime ministers Robert Menzies and Harold Holt. However, creating the political momentum involved substantial grass roots action. Nicholls' daughter, Pam, recalls her father winning support from white Australians at football games:

“With his friend Alick Jackomos, they used to have a card table and go and sit outside the football giving out papers, giving speeches, beckoning people to come sign the petitions for the ‘yes’ vote."

Nicholls interacted with the media frequently. Drawing on his abilities as a preacher, he was able to deliver pithy, persuasive messages which were effective in winning over the Australian public. One common line of argument he made was for the "Yes" vote was:

“I think it’s a matter of democratic right. And we will form a part of the British commonwealth of nations and there should be no legislation setup to discriminate us.

The 1967 Australian referendum was an emphatic success for Nicholls and the FCAATSI leadership, with an average of 90% of Australians supporting the change they had asked for. Following the successful outcome of the referendum, Pastor Doug argued that much more than a legal change had been made, rather, it was:

… evidence that Australians recognise Aborigines are part of the nation.

== Community work and Christian ministry ==
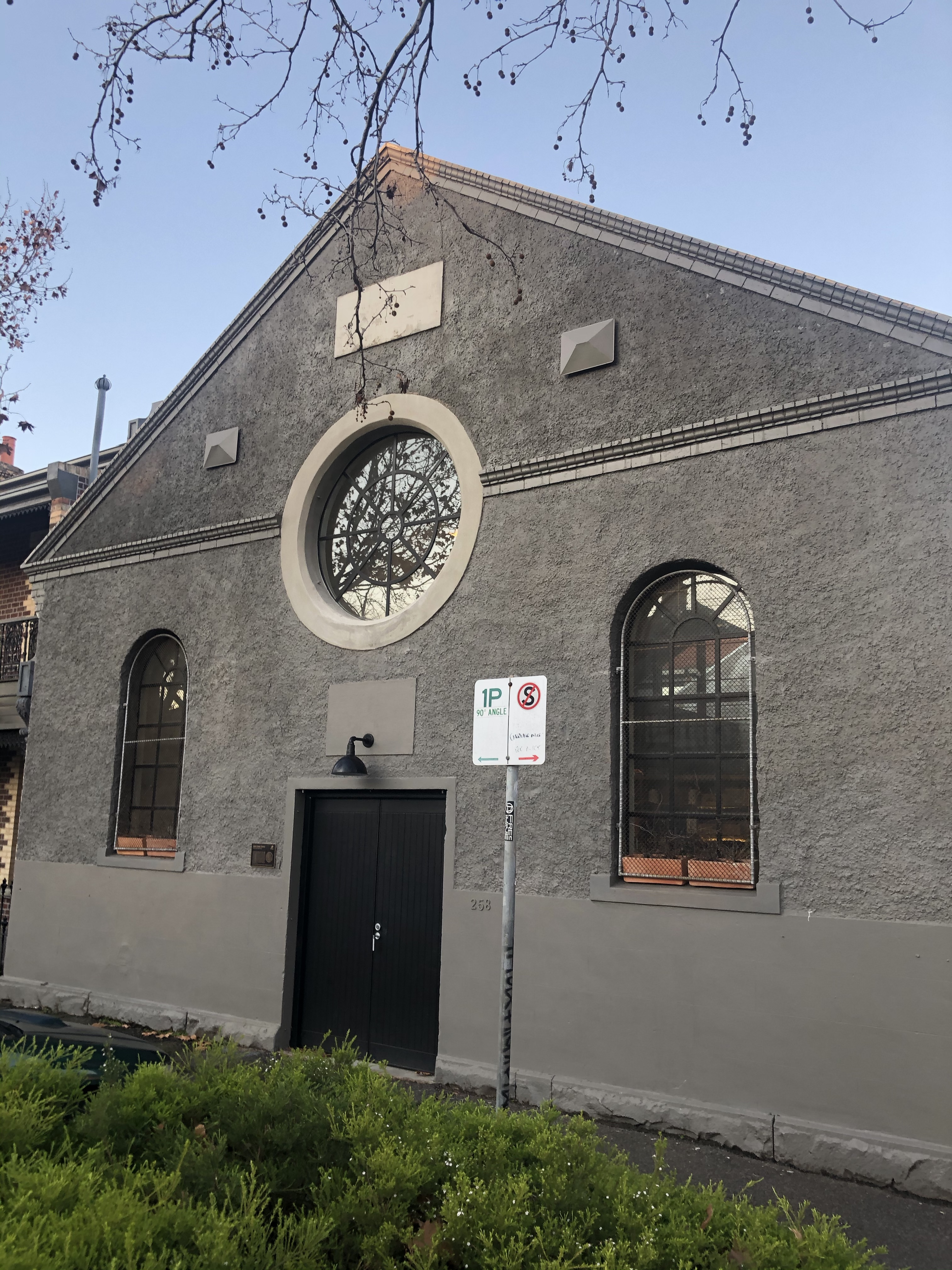
The heritage listed former Aboriginal Church of Christ in Gore St, Fitzroy established by Nicholls in the 1940s

Nicholls was a minister and social worker with Aboriginal people. Following his mother's death he took a renewed interest in Christianity and was baptised at Northcote Church of Christ (now Northern Community Church of Christ) in 1935. He officiated at church and hymn services as a lay preacher at the Gore Street Mission Centre in Fitzroy.

In 1941 Nicholls received his call-up notice and he joined the 29th Battalion but, in 1942, at the request of the Fitzroy police, he was released from his unit to work as a social worker in the Fitzroy Aboriginal community. He cared for those trapped in alcohol abuse, gambling, and other social problems, and those who were in trouble with the police. Indigenous people gathered to him and eventually the group was so large that he became the pastor of the first Aboriginal Church of Christ in Australia. Nicholls was ordained as a minister in 1945, and conducted his ministry from the chapel in Gore St, Fitzroy.

In a letter to the editor, in 1953, it was noted that Opposition Leader, H. V. Evatt, had asked the Prime Minister Robert Menzies, on 26 February, in Federal Parliament, 'for an invitation to be extended to Capt. Reg Saunders or some other outstanding representative of the aborigines' to be included in the official Australian contingent to the coronation of Elizabeth II. The author suggested Nicholls, as an ordained minister, and for his community work in the areas of Fitzroy and Mooroopna.

In March 1957, Nicholls was a foundational member of the Aborigines Advancement League as a field officer, and in July 1957, he resigned from his job with the Northcote Football Ground to become a full time field officer. He edited their magazine, Smoke Signals, and helped draw Aboriginal issues to the attention of Government officials and the general public. He pleaded for dignity for Aboriginal people as human beings. Support for the AAL grew rapidly.

Nicholls helped set up hostels for Aboriginal children, holiday homes for Aboriginal people at Queenscliff and was a founding member and Victorian Secretary of the Federal Council for the Advancement of Aborigines and Torres Strait Islanders (FCAATSI). In response to protests in the 1950s and 60s for an independent, Aboriginal-run farming cooperative at Lake Tyers Mission he campaigned on their behalf, but when the board moved to close Lake Tyers, Nichols resigned his position in protest.

Nicholls was an active Freemason.

== Governor of South Australia ==
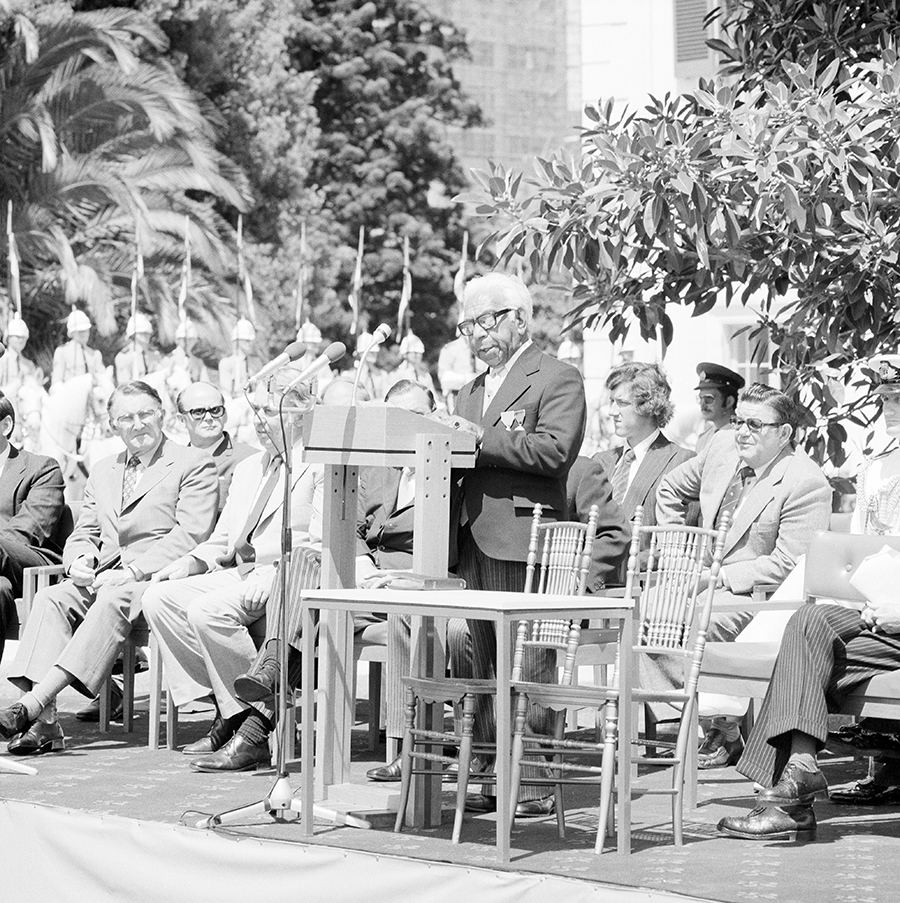
Pastor Sir Douglas Nicholls is sworn in as Governor of South Australia, in front of Premier Don Dunstan and other dignitaries 1977

Nicholls became Governor of South Australia on 1 December 1976, after being announced on 25 May on the nomination of Premier Don Dunstan. He was the first non-white person to serve as the governor of an Australian state, and is the only Aboriginal person to have held viceregal office. Because of his race, his nomination proved controversial and attracted more attention than most viceregal appointments. A poll by ABC's This Day Tonight found that 70 percent of respondents opposed Nicholls becoming governor. The Canberra Times expressed concern that members of his family might set up camp on the grounds of Government House. However, Adelaide's main daily newspaper The Advertiser was more positive, welcoming the news "without reservation". News of the appointment was leaked in May 1976, after which he agreed to appear on A Current Affair. Nicholls took exception to a question directed at his wife, calling the interviewer a racist and requiring him to leave his house. GTV-9 aired the footage without his permission, and subsequently apologised for doing so.

Nicholls' predecessor as governor, nuclear physicist Mark Oliphant, confidentially wrote to the state government expressing concerns about the appointment. He said there were "grave dangers" involved, as "there is something inherent in the personality of the Aborigine which makes it difficult for him to adapt fully to the ways of the white man".

On 25 January 1977, Nicholls suffered a stroke and was admitted to the cardiac ward at Royal Adelaide Hospital. He had a history of high blood pressure and had suffered a mild heart attack some years earlier. He was not discharged until three weeks later, with Lieutenant-Governor Walter Crocker serving as Administrator of the Government in his place. Nicholls attended only one further official engagement after his stroke, hosting Queen Elizabeth II at Government House on 20 March. She subsequently awarded him a second knighthood, Knight Commander of the Royal Victorian Order (KCVO). Nicholls' retirement due to ill health was announced on 22 April, with effect from 30 April. He held office for only 150 days, making him the shortest-serving governor in South Australian history and the only governor to serve for less than a year.

== Family ==
In December 1942 Nicholls married Gladys Nicholls, the widow of his brother, Howard Nicholls (1904–1942); Howard (who had married Gladys in 1927) had died in April 1942 as a result of injuries sustained in a car accident. Gladys already had three children. Douglas Nicholls and Gladys were married for 39 years and raised their combined six children: two sons, Bevan and Ralph, and four daughters, Beryl, Nora, Lilian and Pamela. Lady Nicholls died in 1981.

Nicholls' great-grandson Nathan Lovett-Murray also played Australian rules football in the AFL, playing 145 games for Essendon. His great-great-grandson Ryda Luke was also selected by Fremantle as a Category B rookie in 2025

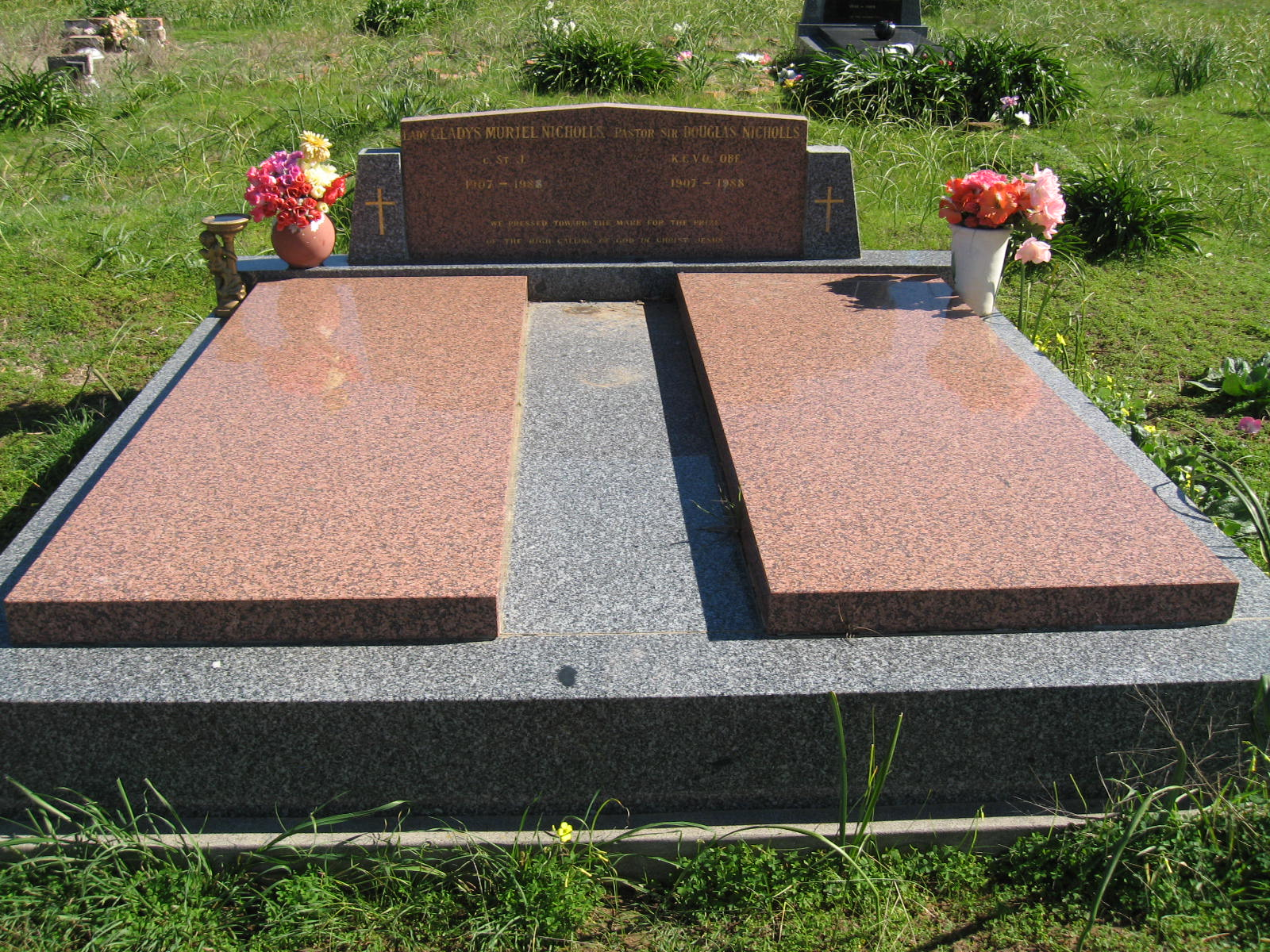
Grave of Douglas and Gladys Nicholls, Cummeragunja Cemetery

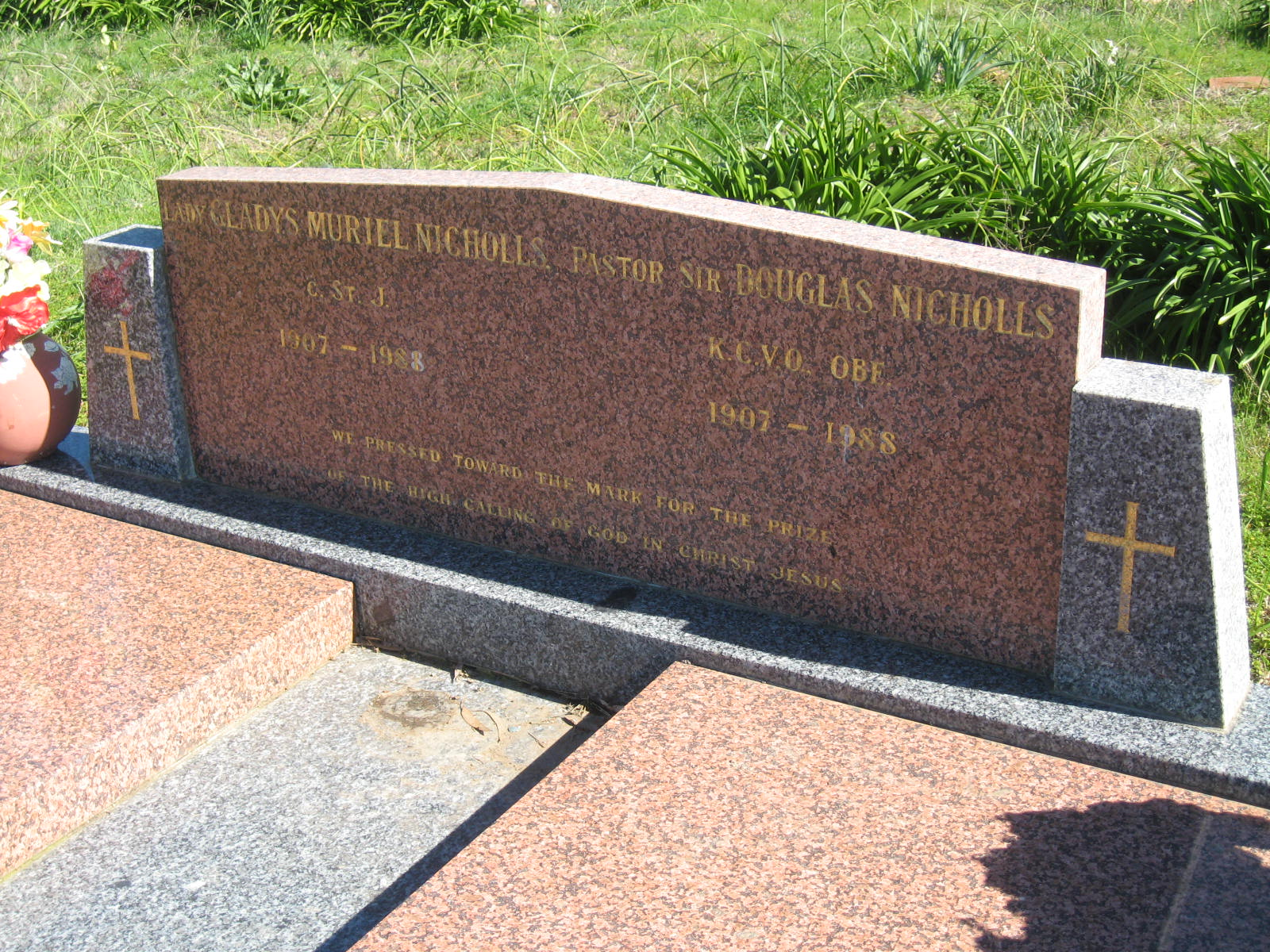
Headstone

== Recognition and legacy ==
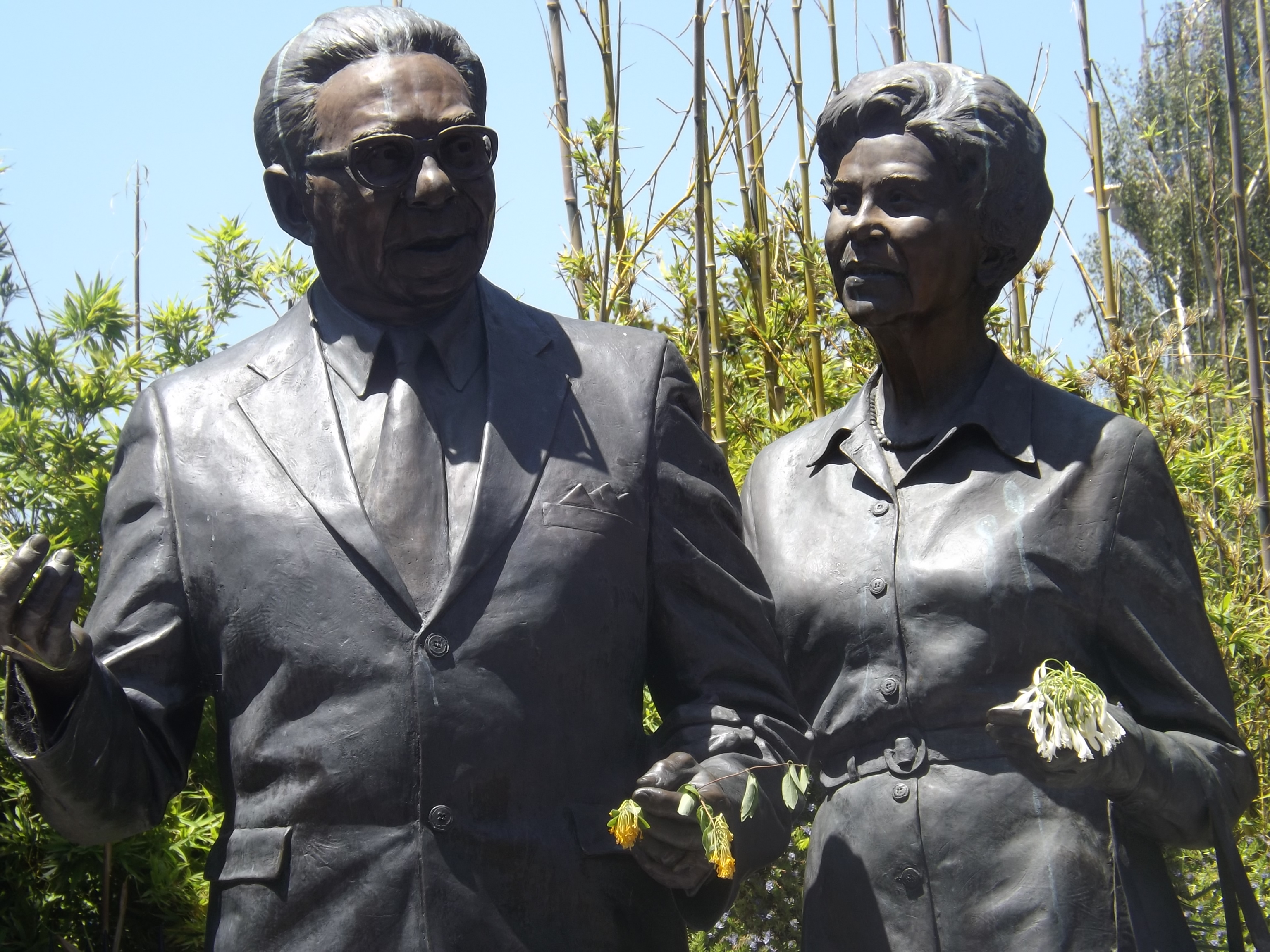
Statue in Parliament Gardens, East Melbourne, Victoria

- 1957 – appointed a Member of the Order of the British Empire (MBE)
- 1962 – chosen by the Father's Day Council of Australia as Victoria's Father of the Year for "outstanding leadership in youth and welfare work and for the inspired example he set the community in his unfailing efforts to further the cause of the Australian Aborigine".
- 1968 – promoted to Officer of the Order of the British Empire (OBE)
- 1970 – among Victorians invited guests to greet Queen Elizabeth II on her visit to Australia
- 1972 – first Aboriginal to be knighted when he was appointed Knight Bachelor; he and his wife Gladys travelled to London to receive that honour.
- 1973 – appointed King of Moomba
- 1976 – appointed the 28th Governor of South Australia, the first Aboriginal person appointed to vice-regal office
- 1977 – appointed a Knight Commander of the Royal Victorian Order (KCVO)
- 1980s - the Sir Douglas Nicholls Sporting Complex in Thornbury named after him
- 1991 – the Canberra suburb of Nicholls named after him
- 2001 – a new chapel in Preston of the Northern Community Church of Christ, the church in which he was baptised, named after him
- 2002 – Establishment of the Pastor Sir Douglas Nicholls Fellowship for Indigenous Leadership, renamed Fellowship for Indigenous Leadership in 2007
- 2006 – to commemorate the centenary of his birth, a statue of Nicholls, one-and-a-half times life size, was approved for the Parliament Gardens, beside the Parliament of Victoria; it was officially opened in December 2007 and was the first memorial statue in Melbourne dedicated to Aboriginal leaders.
- 2008 - a 1963 letter Nicholls wrote to the Editor of The Age was included in Anthology of Australian Aboriginal literature (2008)
- 2011 – inducted to Victorian Aboriginal Honour Roll
- 2016 – The AFL renamed its Indigenous round the Sir Doug Nicholls Round in his honour, and continues to do so. Each year, all 18 teams wear specially-commissioned artworks by Indigenous artists on their guernseys.
- 2017 – Xavier College in Gawler Belt, South Australia, named their gymnasium in honour of Sir Doug Nicholls.
- 2018 – The federal electoral division of Murray is renamed Nicholls in honour of Sir Doug and Lady Nicholls.
- 2018 – a Google Doodle was created to celebrate his 112th birthday.
- 2022 – portrait on an Australia Post stamp, released on 7 July 2022, on the anniversary of Nicholl's first knighting, and also during NAIDOC Week; the eventual result of a request from Bev Murray, grandchild of Nicholls, and created in collaboration with Nicholls' daughter Aunty Pam Pederson

== Death ==
Nicholls died on 4 June 1988 at Mooroopna. A state funeral was held for him and he was buried in the cemetery at Cummeragunja.

== See also ==
- List of Indigenous Australian historical figures

== Sources ==
- Clark, M. (1972), Pastor Doug, Lansdowne Press, Melbourne. ISBN 0-7018-0017-8

Government offices
Preceded by Sir Mark Oliphant	Governor of South Australia; 1976–1977	Succeeded by Sir Keith Seaman
