= Jack Patten =

Aboriginal Australian activist

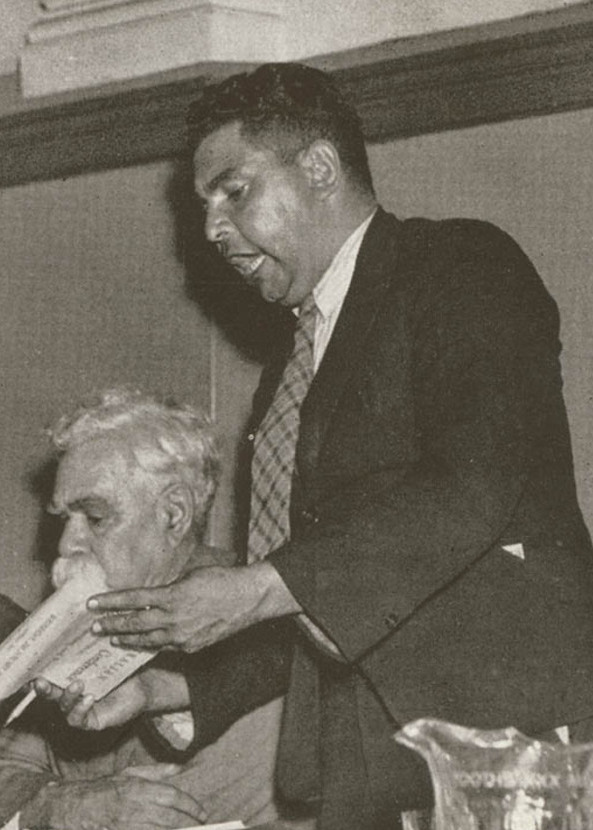
- Patten (standing) with William Cooper at the Day of Mourning in 1938
- Born: John Thomas Patten; 27 March 1905; Cummeragunja Aboriginal Reserve, New South Wales
- Died: 12 October 1957 (aged 52); Melbourne, Victoria, Australia
- Resting place: Fawkner, Victoria

John Thomas Patten (27 March 1905 – 12 October 1957) was an Aboriginal Australian civil rights activist and journalist. He was a co-founder of the Aborigines Progressive Association and led some of the first organised Aboriginal protests, including the Day of Mourning in 1938 and the Cummeragunja walk-off of 1939. He was also the founding editor of the short-lived Australian Abo Call, the first newspaper specifically for Aboriginal Australians.

== Early life ==
Patten was born on 26 March 1905 in Moama, New South Wales. He was the son of Christina Mary (née Middleton) and John James Patten.

Patten was raised on the Cummeragunja Reserve, an Aboriginal reserve in New South Wales. He was educated at public schools in Tumbarumba and West Wyalong, and attended high school at West Wyalong. Following high school, Patten was unsuccessful in joining the Navy and worked for the Sydney Municipal Council. To make ends meet he occasionally worked as a boxer. While boxing at Casino in 1931, Patten married Selina Avery.

== Aboriginal rights movement ==
By about 1930 Patten had moved to the Aboriginal community at Salt Pan Creek on the outskirts of Sydney. During the 1930s he became an experienced organiser and public speaker, speaking regularly on Aboriginal rights at the Domain on Sunday afternoons, along with other Aboriginal activists such as Pearl Gibbs and Tom Foster.

In 1937, Patten co-founded the Aborigines Progressive Association with William Ferguson. As President of the APA Patten organised the 1938 Day of Mourning protest, and led an APA delegation to meet with Joseph Lyons, the Prime Minister. The delegation presented Lyons with Patten and Ferguson's manifesto Aborigines Claim Citizenship Rights, which included Patten's 10-point plan for citizenship rights for Aboriginal people.

=== Publishing ===
In April 1938, Patten established a short-lived monthly newspaper, The Australian Abo Call, the first such Aboriginal-focused publication of its kind. The newspaper "laid the groundwork for political action and linked Aboriginal people together, giving them a common sense of themselves that was unprecedented". Due to the Depression however, it folded in September 1938 after six issues due to a shortage of funds.

=== Cummeragunja walk-off ===
On 4 February 1939 Patten visited Cummeragunja at the request of his father, John Patten Snr, who was a resident on the station. Patten addressed a large gathering of the station's residents in relation to the deteriorating conditions and the intimidation to which the residents were being subjected to under the government appointed manager, Arthur McQuiggan. Patten raised the subject of New South Wales government plans for the removal of Aboriginal children and gave clarity to the station's residents regarding their rights. Patten convinced a majority of the station's residents to leave Cummeragunja, in an event which would come to be known as the Cummeragunja walk-off. Patten was then arrested for "inciting Aborigines".

== Military service and later life ==
Patten enlisted as a private in the Australian Imperial Force in December 1939. He was sent overseas with the 6th Division in February 1940 and saw active service in the Middle East. He was discharged in April 1942 after received shrapnel wounds in the knee. He subsequently joined the Civil Constructional Corps and worked for a period in Tennant Creek, Northern Territory. After the war's end he moved to Melbourne, where he supplemented his war pension with clerical jobs.

Patten died in hospital in October 1957 after being involved in a motor vehicle accident in Fitzroy in Melbourne.
