= William Cooper (Aboriginal Australian) =

Political Activist and Leader

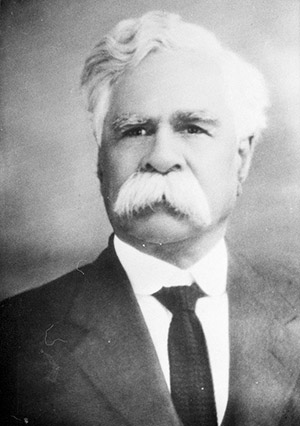

Secretary of the Australian Aborigines' League
- In office September 1933 – February 1941
- Succeeded by: Douglas Nicholls

Personal details
- Born: 18 December 1860 Moira, Colony of Victoria, British Empire
- Died: 29 March 1941 (aged 80) Mooroopna, Victoria, Australia
- Spouse(s): Annie Clarendon, Agnes Hamilton, Sarah MacRae
- Profession: Shearer; Fishmonger; Activist

William Cooper (18 December 1860 or 1861 – 29 March 1941) was an Aboriginal Australian political activist and community leader. He was the first to lead a national movement recognised by the Australian Government.

== Early life ==
William Cooper was born in Yorta Yorta territory around the intersection of the Murray and Goulburn Rivers in Victoria, Australia on 18 December 1860 or 1861. His family was a small remnant of what Cooper recalled as a large tribal group, "As a lad I can remember 500 men of my tribe, the Moiras, gathered on one occasion. Now my family is the only relic of the tribe." From there Cooper appears to have been forced by necessity to work for a variety of pastoral employers, even as a child.

On 4 August 1874, William Cooper, along with his mother Kitty, his brother Bobby, and other relatives, arrived at Maloga, an Aboriginal mission on the Murray run by Daniel and Janet Matthews. Three days later, Matthews was struck by William's quick progress in literacy, and noted the following in his diary:

6 Aug. Maloga. The boy, Billy Cooper, shows great aptitude for learning. He has acquired a knowledge of the Alphabet, capital and small letters, in three days and then taught Bobby – capitals only – in one day.

From there, Cooper's education on the mission was sporadic; there was no requirement for Cooper to attend any school, and he moved to and from the mission freely. In an interview Cooper gave when he was 76, he said he had just seven months' regular schooling.

Instead of school, Cooper said he spent much of his childhood into his teens working in the household of Sir John O'Shanassy, a pastoralist, Victorian Member of Parliament and one-time Premier of Victoria who owned several stations, including the Moira run (on Cooper's own mother's country). Through these pastoral networks, he travelled much of Australia as a teenager, even seeing "the remains of the Burke and Wills Expedition at Cooper’s Creek" in the remote Lake Eyre basin.

However, Cooper kept a connection with the missionary Daniel Matthews and, in his 20s, he returned to Maloga, which appears to represent very happy years. In a letter he wrote towards the end of his life to the missionary's youngest daughter, Alma, he recalled Daniel and Janet and the Maloga community in very warm terms:

I often cast my mind back to them, and the dear old place, and at times it brings tears in my eyes when thinking of the glorious hours, days and months, we spent together; the beautiful singing, the picnics, the games. — Your father’s voice still rings in my ears: We never ever had singing like we did at Maloga.

It was at this time that Cooper took a stronger interest in the message of the Bible. In his early 20s, following a church service in January, 1884, Cooper approached Daniel Matthews and said "I must give my heart to God…." He was the last of his brothers and sisters to become a Christian.

The faith community seems to have nourished Cooper for a life of activism. "Matthews' evangelical work provided Cooper and other Yorta Yorta with powerful way of understanding and protesting against their plight, and so helped equip them to fight for equality." Some academics, such as Bain Attwood, have argued that the Jewish scriptures were particularly influential for Cooper, as it gave a "predictive view of history that promised salvation for the Yorta Yorta, just as the Bible, especially the Book of Exodus, had promised to the persecuted and suffering Israelites."

From 1881, Cooper was educated by Thomas Shadrach James, a polymath Tamil from Mauritius, who had moved to Maloga to become the resident teacher. Cooper read widely, learning of the indigenous rights movements in North America and New Zealand.

For most of his adult life, Cooper lived and worked in missions such as Maloga and Warangesda. He also found work as a "shearer, drover, horse-breaker and general rural labourer in Queensland, South Australia, New South Wales and Victoria."

== Campaign for Aboriginal rights ==
Cooper's campaign for Aboriginal rights, especially land rights, began with the Maloga Petition in 1887. He was one of eleven signatories to the petition, which was addressed to the Governor of New South Wales. The petition Cooper supported held that local Aboriginal people

...should be granted sections of land not less than 100 acres per family in fee simple or else at a small nominal rental annually with the option of purchase at such prices as shall be deemed reasonable for them under the circumstances, always bearing in mind that the Aborigines were the former occupiers of the land. Such a provision would enable them to earn their own livelihood ...

In his 70s, when he discovered he was ineligible for the pension if he remained on an Aboriginal reserve, Cooper moved to Footscray in western Melbourne in 1933. Here he found his calling as an activist, organiser, and letter-writer. At first this was in an individual capacity, but by 1935 Cooper had helped establish the Australian Aborigines' League. As its secretary, Cooper circulated a petition seeking direct representation in parliament, enfranchisement, and land rights, on the basis that all Aboriginal people and Torres Strait Islanders were British subjects. He made up his mind to petition King George V. Over several years, he and his team collected 1814 signatures, despite active obstruction from the national and state governments He appears to have been helped in his cause by some missionaries, such as Rev E. R. B. Gribble in 1933. The text of the distributed petition, which was also published in The Herald (Melbourne) on 15 September 1933, was as follows:

Whereas it was not only a moral duty, but also a strict injunction included in the commission issued to those who came to people Australia that the original occupants and we, their heirs and successors, should be adequately cared for; and whereas the terms of the commission have not been adhered to, in that (a) our lands have been expropriated by your Majesty's Government in the Commonwealth, (b) legal status is denied to us by your Majesty's Government in the Commonwealth; and whereas all petitions made in our behalf to your Majesty's Government in the Commonwealth have failed: your petitioners therefore humbly pray that your Majesty will intervene in our behalf and through the instrument of your Majesty's Government in the Commonwealth grant to our people representation in the Federal Parliament, either in the person of one of our own blood or by a white man known to have studied our needs and to be in sympathy with our race.

The petition was received by the Commonwealth Government in August 1937. However, by February 1938, it was clear that the Cabinet led by Joseph Lyons had decided that it should not be submitted to King George VI.

Cooper was also effective in securing face-to-face meetings with governments. In 1935 he was part of the first aboriginal deputation to a Commonwealth minister and in 1938, the first deputation to the Prime Minister. The government of the day rejected his requests, or, perhaps more accurately, ignored them. By the late 1930s his activities were actively monitored. In December 1937, Cooper received a visit from a detective acting on behalf of the Commonwealth Investigation Branch.

Seeing the failure of using democratic means, Cooper's Australian Aborigines' League joined forces with Jack Patten and William Ferguson from the Aborigines Progressive Association to shame white Australia. They arranged a Day of Mourning to commemorate the sesquicentenary of colonisation, on Australia Day, 1938. The event, which was watched by journalists and police, was held in Australian Hall in Elizabeth Street, Sydney, and was the first combined interstate protest by Aboriginal Australians. He said:

Now is our chance to have things altered. We must fight our very hardest in this cause. I know we could proudly hold our own with others if given the chance. We should all work in cooperation for the progress of Aborigines throughout the Commonwealth.

Cooper retired in November 1940 to reside with his wife at Barmah, near Echuca, Victoria; having been made an honorary life member and president of the Australian Aborigines League. Cooper continued protesting the injustice of the Australian treatment of its Indigenous people until his death at Mooroopna Base Hospital on 29 March 1941. His funeral was held at the church in Cummeragunja, the service conducted by his nephew Edward Atkinson, and he was buried at the nearby mission cemetery.

== Family ==
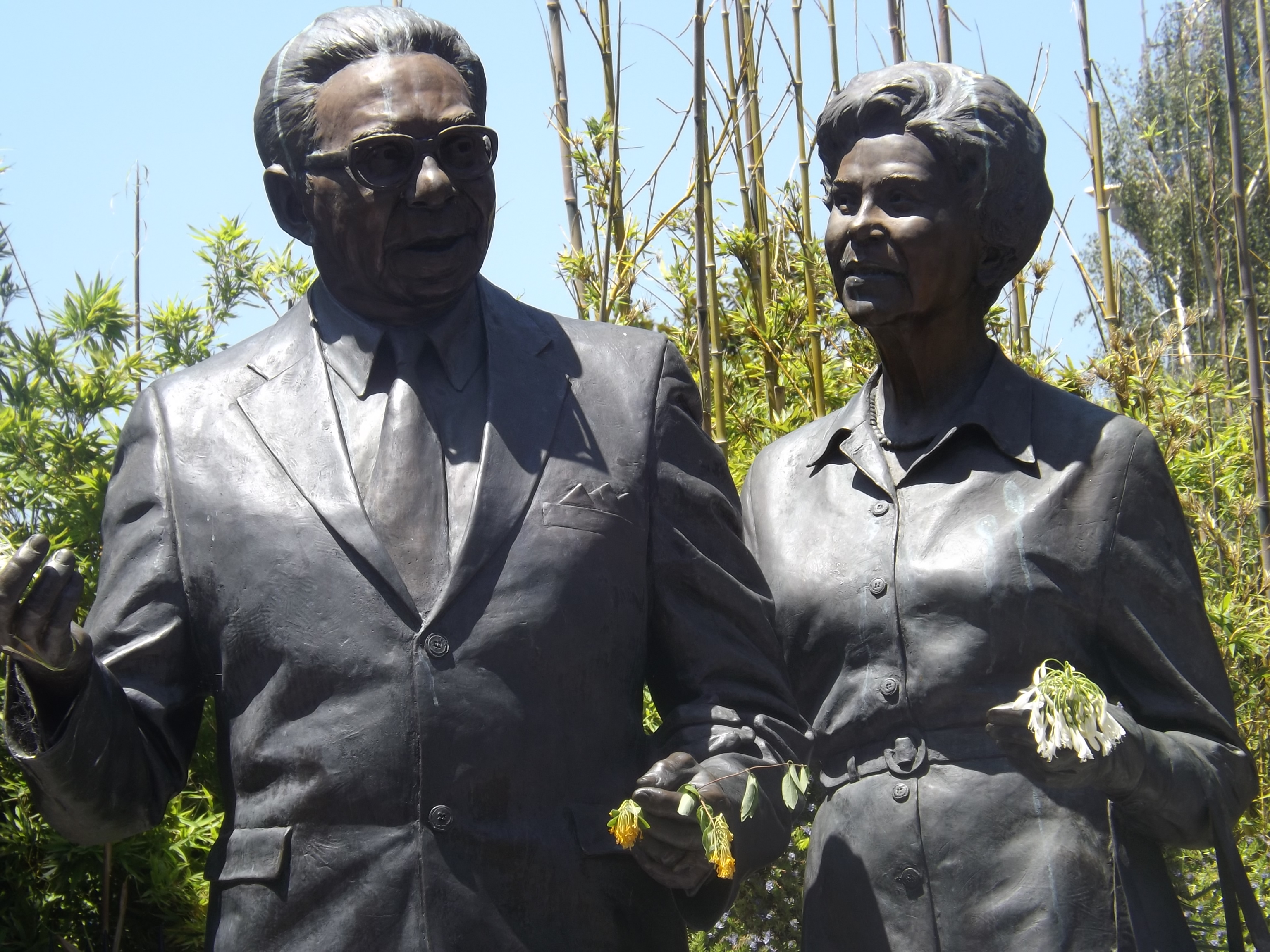
Statue of Sir Douglas Nicholls, who was mentored by his uncle, William Cooper, and his wife Lady Gladys, in Parliament Gardens, Victoria

William was born to Kitty Cooper, who identified as a Wollithica woman and spoke Yorta Yorta; and to James Cooper, a white labourer. His early years were spent in and around Moira Station.

Cooper married Annie Clarendon Murri on 17 June 1884 at the Maloga schoolhouse, the mission report stating that "The schoolhouse was filled with Blacks and visitors, and all looked charming and delighted, not less so the bride and bridegroom." She died in 1889, as did the first of their children, Bartlett; fortunately, their daughter Emma survived.

Four years after, Cooper married Agnes Hamilton, who had grown up at the Coranderrk Mission. Six children were born to them, Daniel, Amy, Gillison, Jessie, Sarah and Lynch. Cooper's experience of loss continued, with Agnes dying in 1910.

Daniel, who was named for his father's mentor, Daniel Matthews, served with the 24th Australian Infantry Battalion and was killed in action at the Battle of the Menin Road Ridge in Belgium, in late 1917. His loss devastated Cooper. When war loomed again, Cooper argued that his people should not fight until they had "something to fight for".

Amy Charles became the matron of the first Aboriginal hostel established in Melbourne in 1959. Lynch Cooper enjoyed a career as an athlete, winning the 1928 Stawell Gift and in 1929 the world professional sprint championship competition.

At age 65, William married Sarah Nelson, née McCrae, of Wahgunyah and Coranderrk. She supported him in his most prolific years as a community leader, helping to raise his many grandchildren, though they had no children together.

Cooper had many prominent relatives in his wider family, including his protégé, the church planter and Governor of South Australia, Pastor Sir Doug Nicholls, and the educator Thomas Shadrach James.

== Protest against Kristallnacht ==
The "cruel persecution of the Jewish people by the Nazi government of Germany" was an issue for the Australian Aboriginal League. In a 1997 essay, historian Gary Foley argued that it was "probable that the ironies of the deputation’s visit to the German Consulate were part of the group’s strategy to draw attention to the similarities between what was happening in Germany and how Aboriginal people were being dealt with in Australia."

Cooper has been widely associated with the AAL's petition, although there is no evidence that he was present when the league attempted to hand over the petition. According to Monash University professor of history Bain Attwood, "it is quite likely that he was not, as his health had declined considerably by this time". The German Consulate did not accept the petition, but Alf Turner, Cooper's grandson, presented the consulate with a replica letter 79 years later.

The protest has been referred to as "the only private protest against the Germans following Kristallnacht." However, this characterisation has been disputed by historian Hilary L. Rubinstein as a "falsehood" and "not accurate". Rubinstein states there were in fact several other protests against Kristallnacht in Australia, which are "unremembered and unremarked by the Australian Jewish community today" compared with Cooper's actions. Rubenstein also states that accolades for Cooper's protest have been pushed by "leftist inverse racism" but this subjective view does not take into consideration the disenfranchisement of Indigenous Australians who at the time were not even able to vote, making this protest even more impressive.

In 2018 members of the Victorian Jewish community organised a walk on 6 December "in remembrance and appreciation of William Cooper and to reciprocate the march that he led on the German Consulate in Melbourne on the 6th December 1938."

== Legacy ==
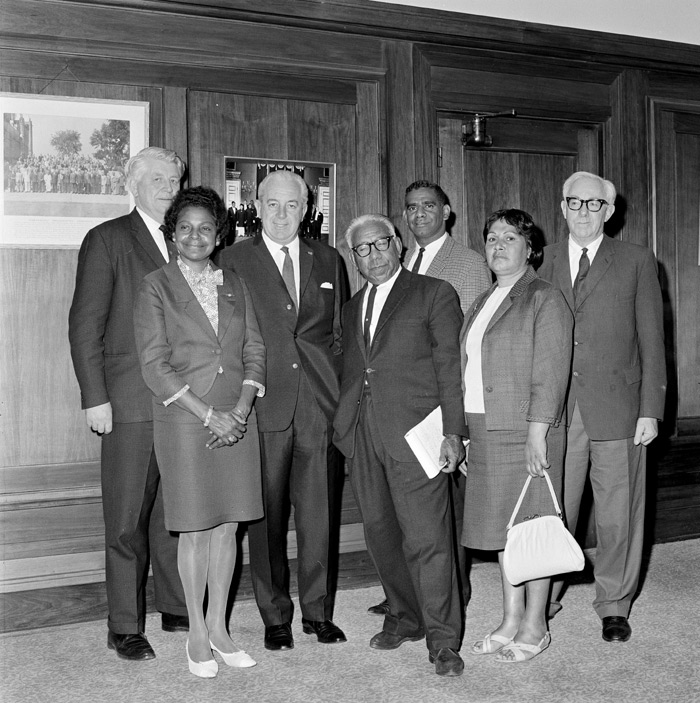
Cooper's goal to see Aboriginal affairs made a Commonwealth responsibility was not achieved until 1967, thanks in part to his protege, Douglas Nicholls (centre).

The commemoration of NAIDOC Week – seen here at Gosnells Football Club in July 2019 – have their origins in a national day of prayer, initiated by Cooper.

In his own lifetime, Cooper achieved few of the goals he had set for himself. The one exception was the creation of Aborigines Sunday, which was observed in Churches across Australia from 1940. It is still commemorated today as NAIDOC Week. However, many of his initiatives have gained recognition long after his death.

His influence extended to the next generation of Aboriginal activists through his nephew and protégé Douglas Nicholls, a founding member of Federal Council for the Advancement of Aborigines and Torres Strait Islanders, whose greatest achievement was successfully lobbying to change racist elements of the Australian Constitution via plebiscite. This campaign was a complete success, resulting in the 1967 Australian referendum, in which 90.77% of Australians voted to support the inclusion of Aboriginal Australians in census counts and to enable the federal government to make laws relating to Indigenous Australians.

The Maloga Petition which Cooper had signed and supported in his early years resulted in the Government allocating 1,800 acres (730 ha) of land upstream from Maloga for Aboriginal use, which became known as Cummeragunja. It is still an Aboriginal community today under the stewardship of a local land council.

Cooper's life and work are the subject of a book entitled Blood from a Stone – William Cooper and the Australian Aborigines League, written by Andrew Markus and published by Allen & Unwin in 1988.

=== 21st century recognition ===
In recent years, Cooper's legacy has been appreciated by the Jewish community. In 2002, a plaque was unveiled at the Jewish Holocaust Centre in Melbourne in honour of "the Aboriginal people for their actions protesting against the persecution of Jews by the Nazi Government of Germany in 1938". The story of the protest is featured in the Jewish Holocaust Centre's permanent museum.

On 20 May 2010 the new footbridge at Footscray railway station was named for William Cooper.

On 5 October 2010, a court complex named the William Cooper Justice Centre was opened in Melbourne.

In December 2010, there were three commemorative events:

- Cooper's great-grandson, Kevin Russell re-enacted the walk from Cooper's home, meeting up with Cooper's grandson Uncle Boydie at Federation Square.
- Cooper was honoured in Israel by the creation of an academic chair in his honour to support resistance and research of World Holocaust Studies. A professorship attached to this Academic Chair is valued at $1,000,000. The Yad VaShem Holocaust museum in Israel named the Chair of Resistance Studies at its research arm in Cooper's honour, and a plaque attesting to this is mounted at the museum.
- A Tribute was held at Yad Vashem World Holocaust Memorial, with the family as invited guests. The Australian/Israel Leadership Forum hosted an associated Gala Dinner to be attended by Kevin Rudd, Julie Bishop and another 17 Ministers including the Prime Minister of Israel, Benjamin Netanyahu.

In 2012, Cooper was inducted into the Victorian Aboriginal Honour Roll in recognition of his role as a mobilizing force in the early struggle for Indigenous rights.

In 2012 Cooper's grandson, Uncle Alf (Boydie) Turner, led a re-enactment of the march by Cooper and his friends. The German consul-general in Melbourne finally accepted a copy of Cooper's protest letter. Also a cantata is being composed to commemorate both "William Cooper’s courage and the 1938 pogrom".

The William Cooper Cup is an annual trophy awarded to the winner of an Australian rules football match between the Aboriginal All-Stars and Victoria Police at Whitten Oval in Footscray.

In June 2018, the Australian Electoral Commission renamed the federal Division of Batman to Division of Cooper in Cooper's honour.

In 2019, Perth's Jewish Community Centre announced plans to redevelop their centre and also construct a Holocaust education centre. Among their plans are a permanent memorial to Cooper. The centre, JHub Maccabi Community Centre, is now mostly complete as of 2024.

== See also ==
- List of Indigenous Australian historical figures

== Sources ==
- Attwood, B. (2021) William Cooper; an Aboriginal life story, Miegunyah Press, Melbourne
- Attwood, B. & Markus, A. (2004) Thinking Black: William Cooper and the Australian Aborigines' League, Aboriginal Studies Press: Canberra.
- Cato, N. (1993) Mister Maloga, University of Queensland Press, St. Lucia, Queensland.
