= Nauwalabila I =

Ancient rock shelter in the Northern Territory of Australia

Nauwalabila I (formerly known as the Lindner Site), is a sandstone rock shelter located in Deaf Adder Gorge in the Northern Territory of Australia. Along with Madjedbebe, this site is one of the oldest in terms of human settlement in Australia, with its estimated age being greater than 50,000 years. Nowadays, this site can be found in Kakadu National Park, a UNESCO World Heritage site that is partially owned by the collective Aboriginal population of Arnhem Land.

== Archaeological findings ==
Similar to the discovery of the Madjedbebe site, Nauwalabila I was first made known in the early 1970's, through the Alligator Rivers Environmental Fact Finding Study, before being initially excavated in 1972-73 by Johan Kamminga and Harry Allen. The site was excavated more thoroughly by Rhys Jones (archaeologist) and Ian Johnson in 1981. It was then that Jones and Johnson were able to uncover over 30,000 stone artifacts from the site, which spanned 3.0 m in depth. The upper 2.5 m of the deposit consisted of distinct stratigraphic layers of sand, while the lower to basal portion contained rubble and compacted sand. Charcoal samples from this excavation were also collected for radiocarbon dating.

In 1989, Bert Roberts conducted another excavation on the original deposit, this time, collecting samples for optically stimulated luminescence (OSL) dating. These samples were closely compared to similar stratigraphic layers from the Madjedbebe site, where such samples were dated by thermoluminescence (TL) methods. Eventually, samples from Nauwalabila I also underwent TL dating methods. Since then, the site has not undergone any more excavations, but subsequent research have made use of the original samples.

== Site dating dispute ==
Given its close proximity to Madjedbebe, which was dated to be 50,000-65,000 years old, Nauwalabila I was anticipated to be a similar age. Earlier research suggests this to be the case, where OSL dates from Nauwalabila I were in agreement with TL dates from Madjedbebe, providing an age range of 53,000-60,000 years. These dates were further corroborated by more specific TL dates from Nauwalabila I samples, resulting in a date bracket of 53,400 +/- 5,400 to 60,300 +/- 6,700 BP. Overall, the broad age of 50,000-60,000 BP has been generally accepted, but skepticism over the integrity of the Nauwalabila I samples has persisted.

Dating the upper layers of the deposit was achievable via TL, OSL, and radiocarbon, where there was strong agreement between the dates proposed by each technique. For depositional layers below 1.5 m, however, dating has been more difficult and beyond the range of reliable radiocarbon dating. Analyses below this depth have since been the subject of question, as most do not correlate with the TL dates for the Nauwalabila I samples mentioned above. Instead, these analyses were rejected likely due to vertical displacement of both sediments and artifacts. Based on these findings, it has been suggested that Nauwalabila I is no older than 40,000 BP.

There is an outstanding debate that bioturbation, especially by termites, is responsible for the displacement of sediment layers and artifacts at both Nauwalabila I and Madjedbebe. Smith et al. (2020) developed a criterion to diagnose the impacts of bioturbation caused termite stone layers and ultimately determined that termite activity did not have a significant impact on the stratigraphy of Nauwalabila I. More recently, Williams et al. (2021) disputed this conclusion and claimed that Smith et al.'s diagnostic criteria was insufficient. Williams et al. claimed that previously retrieved OSL and radiocarbon dates supports a post-depositional, downward displacement of sediments and artifacts, meaning that the site is unlikely to 65,000 years old.

== Stone tools ==
The 1981 excavation by Jones and Johnson yielded over 30,000 artifacts, primarily made of chert, quartz, and quartzite flakes. For the majority of the lower layers, quartz dominated as the primary material of any unmodified flakes, but there was a brief period, dating 3,000-19,000 BP, where chert was more prominent than quartz. At the basal layer, tools likely to be scraper edges were uncovered and dated to 19,000-25,000 BP. Additionally, axe fragments were uncovered throughout the deposit, dating back to 30,000 BP. Other tools found in this deposit include quartzite lauwk blades (1,000 BP) and hafted stone chisels (4,000 BP).

== Rock art ==
At both Madjedbebe and Nauwalabila I, ground hematite and thus, ochre fragments, have been uncovered in nearly every layer of these deposits. Specifically, these pigment concentrations are observed in peaks throughout the deposit, occurring every two thousand years since 6,000 BP, with the first peak dating back to 12,000-13,000 BP. This date estimate may also potentially apply to dynamic figure rock art found nearby. Such Pleistocene-Holocene rock art often featured handprints, macropods, reptiles, humans, and axes.

== See also ==
- History of Indigenous Australians
