= History of Indigenous Australians =

Overview of Indigenous Australian history

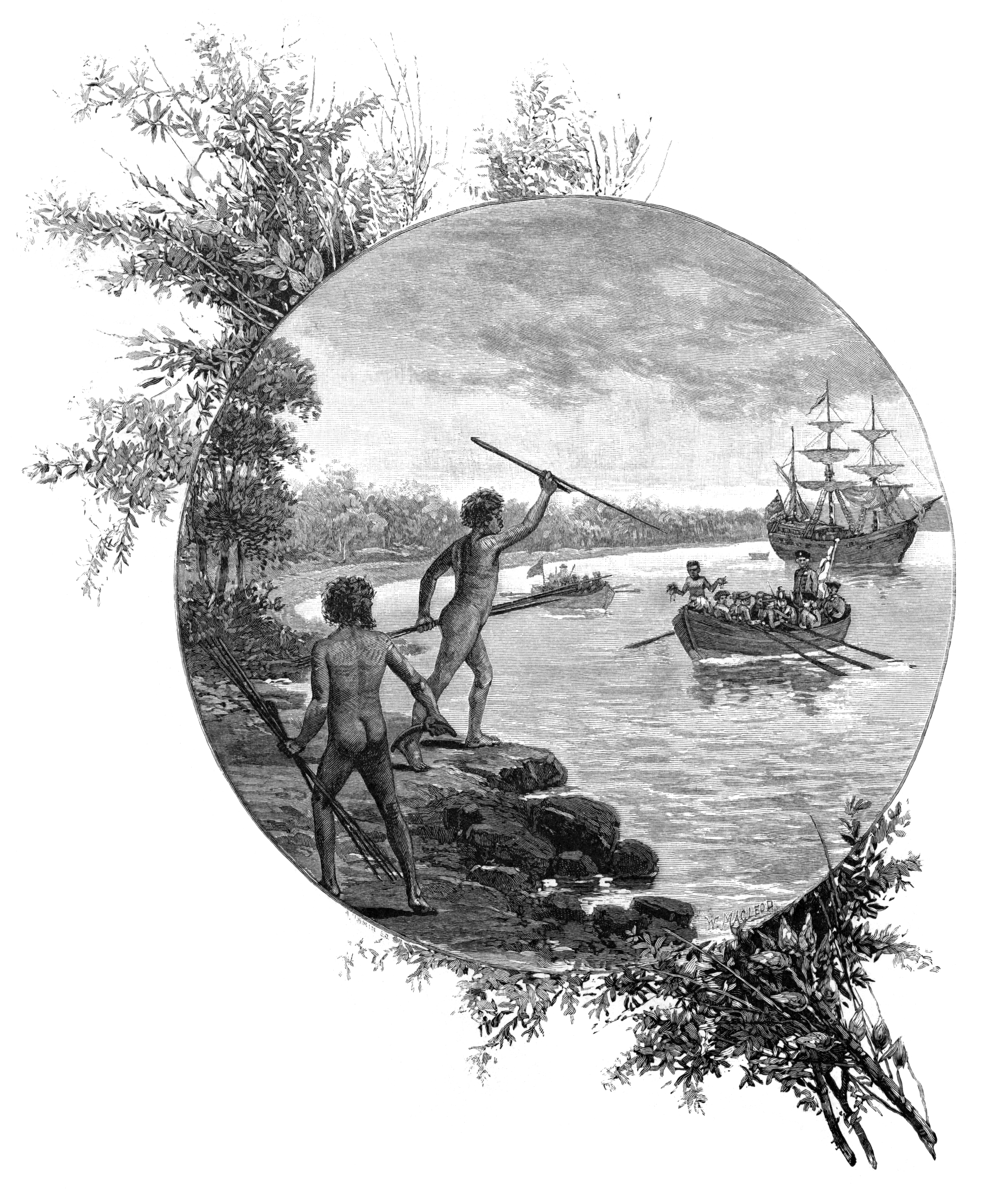
An engraving from the late 19th century depicting Gweagal men confronting a British landing party in 1770

The history of Indigenous Australians began 50,000 to 65,000 years ago when humans first populated the Australian continent. This article covers the history of Aboriginal Australian and Torres Strait Islander peoples, two broadly defined groups which each include other sub-groups defined by language and culture. Human habitation of the Australian continent began with the migration of the ancestors of today's Aboriginal Australians by land bridges and short sea crossings from what is now Southeast Asia. The Aboriginal people spread throughout the continent, adapting to diverse environments and climate change to develop one of the oldest continuous cultures on Earth.

At the time of first European contact, the Aboriginal population exceeded two million. They were primarily complex hunter-gatherers with diverse economies and societies. There were about 600 tribes or nations and 250 languages with various dialects. Certain groups engaged in fire-stick farming and fish farming, and built semi-permanent shelters. The extent to which some groups engaged in agriculture is controversial.

The Torres Strait Islander people permanently settled their islands at least 2,500 years ago. Culturally and linguistically distinct from mainland Aboriginal peoples, they were seafarers and obtained their livelihood from seasonal horticulture and the resources of their reefs and seas. Agriculture also developed on some islands. Villages had appeared in their areas by the 14th century.

The British Empire established a penal colony at Botany Bay in 1788. In the 150 years that followed, 90% of Indigenous Australians died due to introduced diseases and violent conflict with the colonists. From the 1930s, the Indigenous population began to recover and Indigenous communities founded organisations to advocate for their rights. From the 1960s, Indigenous people won the right to vote in federal and state elections, and some won the return of parts of their traditional lands. In 1992, the High Court of Australia, in the Mabo Case, found that Indigenous native title rights existed in common law. By 2021, Indigenous Australians had exclusive or shared title to about 54% of the Australian land mass.

From 1971 to 2006, Indigenous employment, median incomes, home ownership, education and life expectancy all improved, although they remained well below the level for those who were not indigenous. Since 2008, successive Australian governments have launched policies aimed at reducing Indigenous disadvantage in education, employment, literacy and child mortality. However, by 2023 Indigenous people still experienced entrenched inequality. In October 2023, the Australian people, in a referendum, voted against a constitutional amendment to establish an Indigenous advisory body to government.

== Migration ==
The ancient continents of Sundaland and Sahul

=== Human habitation of the continent ===
It is believed that early human migration to Australia was achieved when it formed a part of the Sahul continent, connected to the island of New Guinea via a land bridge. This would have nevertheless required crossing the sea at the so-called Wallace Line. It is also possible that people came by island-hopping via an island chain between Sulawesi and New Guinea, reaching North Western Australia via Timor.

A 2021 study which mapped likely migration routes suggests that the populating of the Sahul took 5,000–6,000 years to reach Tasmania (then part of the continent), with a rate of one kilometre per year, after making landfall in the Kimberley region of Western Australia around 60,000 years ago. The total human population could have been as high as 6.4 million, with 3 million in the area of modern Australia. The modelling suggests that the path of population movement may have followed two main routes down from contemporary New Guinea, with the so-called "southern route" going into Kimberley, Pilbara and Arnhem Land, and then to the Great Sandy Desert before moving towards the centre in Lake Eyre and further on to the southeast of the continent. It also leads through another path to the southwestern parts, such as Margaret River and the Nullarbor Plain. The "northern route" meanwhile crosses over the current location of the Torres Strait and then divides into one path connecting to Arnhem Land and another leading down the East Coast.

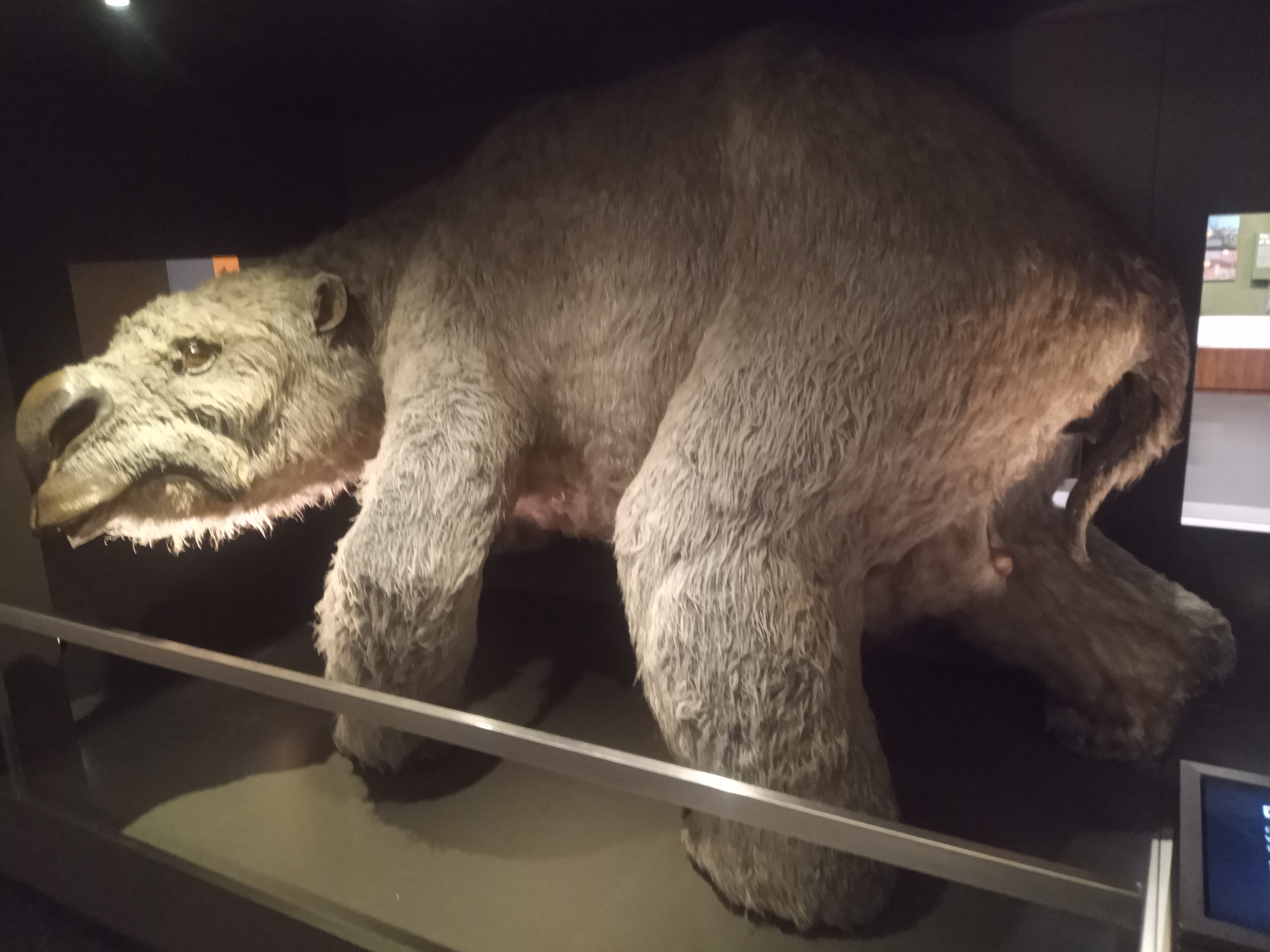
A museum model of Diprotodon, a hippopotamus-sized marsupial and member of the Australian megafauna encountered by the first Indigenous Australian settlers.

Madjedbebe, in the north of the continent, is possibly the oldest known site showing the presence of humans in Australia, with one study dating it to 65,000 ± 6,000 years ago and at least by 50,000 years ago. The rock shelters at Madjedbebe (about 50 kilometres (31 mi) inland from the present coast) and at Nauwalabila I (70 kilometres (43 mi) further south) show possible evidence of ochre used by artists 60,000 years ago. However, a 2020 study found that first human occupation at these sites might have been more recent.

From the north, the population spread into a range of very different environments. Devil's Lair in the extreme south-west of the continent was occupied around 47,000 BP (before present) and Tasmania by 39,000 BP.

Near Penrith, stone tools have been found in Cranebrook Terraces gravel sediments having dates of 45,000 to 50,000 years BP. A 2018 study using archaeobotany dated evidence of human habitation at Karnatukul (Serpent's Glen) in the Carnarvon Range in the Little Sandy Desert in WA at around 50,000 years, which was 20,000 earlier than previously believed. The integration of human genomic evidence from various parts of the world also supports a date of about 50,000 years ago for the arrival of Aboriginal people in the continent.

The oldest human remains found are at Lake Mungo in New South Wales, which have been dated to around 41,000 years ago. The site suggests one of the world's oldest known cremations, indicating early evidence for religious ritual among humans.

Humans reached Tasmania approximately 40,000 years ago by migrating across a land bridge from the mainland that existed during the last glacial maximum. After the seas rose about 12,000 years ago and covered the land bridge, the inhabitants there were isolated from the mainland until the arrival of European settlers.

Short-statured Aboriginal people inhabited the rainforests of North Queensland, of which the best known group is probably the Tjapukai of the Cairns area.

Genomic studies suggest that the peopling of Australia happened between 43,000 and 60,000 years ago. DNA studies have suggested that the ancestors of Aboriginal Australians belonged to the southern route dispersal following the "out of Africa" exit, which expanded into the South and Southeast Asia region and subsequently diverged rapidly into the ancestors of Ancient Ancestral South Indians (AASI), Andamanese, East Asians, other Australasians, such as Papuans.

=== Indian migration theory ===
A number of changes in Indigenous culture about 4,000 years ago have led some scholars to theorise that a second wave of immigration was responsible. These changes include the introduction of the dingo, the spread of the Pama-Nyungan language family over most of the mainland, and new stone tool technology using smaller tools. The Pama-Nyungan language family, probably originated between 5,000 and 3,000 BP, expanded during the Middle Holocene period. A 2013 study based on large-scale genotyping, indicated that Aboriginal Australians, the indigenous peoples of New Guinea and the Mamanwa of the Philippines were closely related, having diverged from a common origin approximately 36,000 years ago. The same study suggested that Aboriginal genomes consist of up to 11% Indian DNA, indicating a substantial gene flow between Indian populations and northern Australia occurred around 4,000 years ago. However, a 2016 study using advanced gene sequencing technology showed no Indian DNA and that Aboriginal people diverged from other Sahul peoples 47,000 to 53,000 years ago. The authors concluded that Aboriginal Australians were probably the source for the technological and linguistic changes 4,000 years ago. The consensus of scholars is that before the arrival of the British there was probably only one wave of immigration to Australia at least 50,000 years ago.

== History to 1770 ==
=== Geography and cultural adaptation ===
The shoreline of Tasmania and Victoria about 14,000 years ago, as sea levels were rising, showing some of the human archaeological sites

When the north-west of Australia was first occupied, the region consisted of open tropical forests and woodlands. After around 10,000 years of stable climatic conditions, by which time the Aboriginal people had settled the entire continent, temperatures began cooling leading to an ice age. By the glacial maximum, 25,000 to 15,000 years ago, the sea level had dropped to around 140 metres below its present level. Australia was connected to New Guinea and the Kimberley region of Western Australia was separated from Southeast Asia (Wallacea) by a strait only approximately 90 km wide. Rainfall was 40% to 50% lower than modern levels, depending on region. The Kimberley, including the adjacent exposed continental Sahul Shelf, was covered by vast grasslands dominated by flowering plants of the family Poaceae, with woodlands and semi-arid scrub covering the shelf joining New Guinea to Australia.

Tasmania was covered primarily by cold steppe and alpine grasslands, with snow pines at lower altitudes. There may have been a significant reduction in Australian Aboriginal populations during this time, with scattered "refugia" where vegetation and Aboriginal populations were able to survive. Corridors between these refugia seem to be routes by which people kept in contact. With the end of the ice age, strong rains returned, until around 5,500 years ago, when the wet season cycle in the north ended, bringing with it a megadrought that lasted 1,500 years. The return of reliable rains around 4,000 years BP gave Australia its current climate.

Following the Ice Age, Aboriginal people around the coast, from Arnhem Land, the Kimberley and the southwest of Western Australia, all tell stories of former territories that were drowned beneath the sea with the rising coastlines. It was this event that isolated the Tasmanian Aboriginal people on their island, and probably led to the extinction of Aboriginal cultures on the Bass Strait Islands and Kangaroo Island in South Australia. In the interior, the end of the Ice Age may have led to the recolonisation of the desert and semi-desert areas by Aboriginal people of the Northern Territory. This in part may have been responsible for the spread of languages of the Pama–Nyungan language family and secondarily responsible for the spread of male initiation rites involving circumcision. There has been a long history of contact between Papuan peoples of the Western Province, Torres Strait Islanders and the Aboriginal people in Cape York.

Aboriginal people developed technologies to better exploit diverse environments. Fibre and nets for use in watercraft and fishing developed before 40,000 BP. More complex tools, such as edge-ground axes hafted to wooden handles, appeared by 35,000 BP. Elaborate trade networks also developed. Ochre was transported 250 kilometres from the Barrier Range to Lake Mungo 40,000 years ago. Shells (for decorative beads) were transported 500 kilometres by 30,000 BP. More extensive trade networks developed in later times.

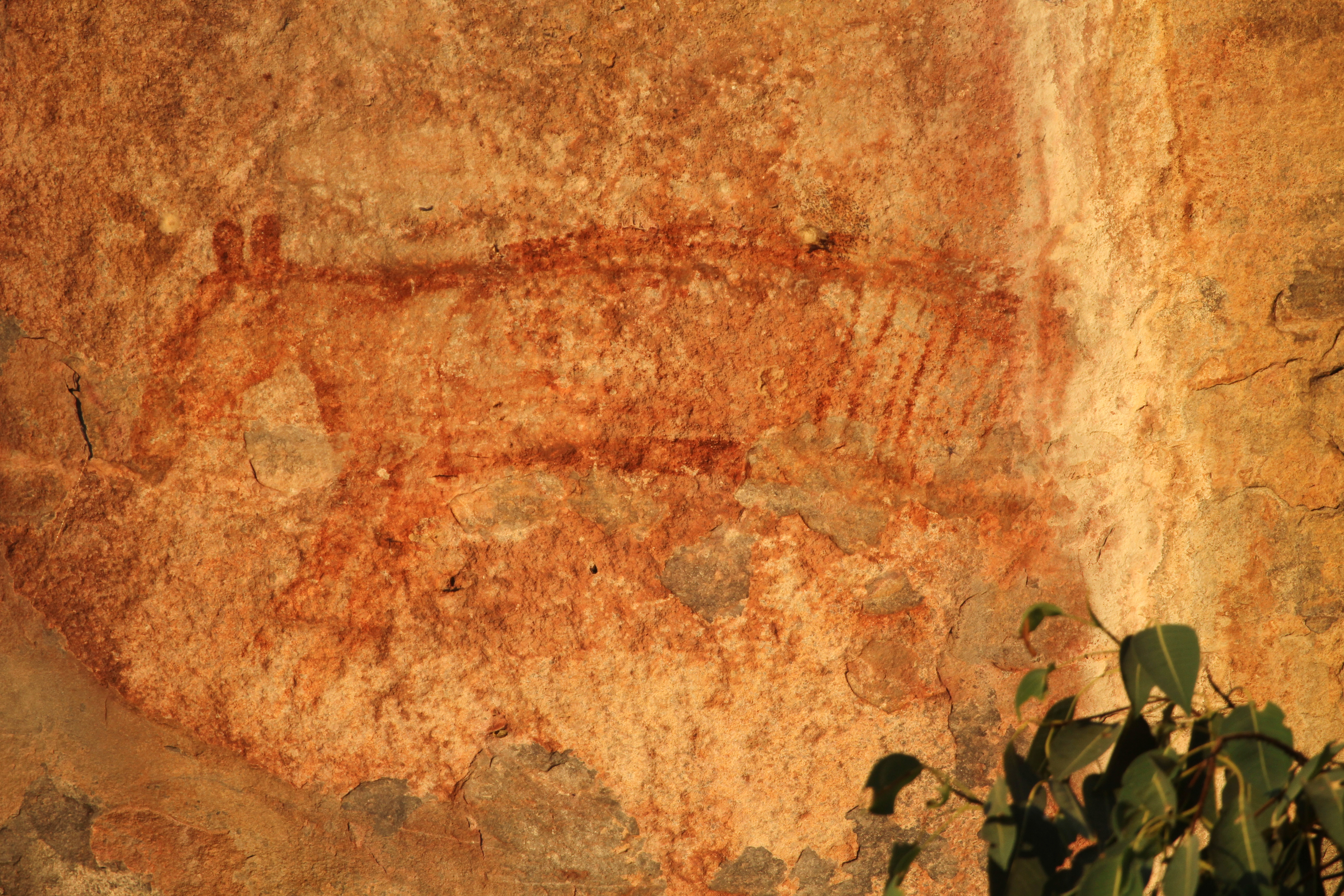
Aboriginal rock art depicting a thylacine on the Ubirr rock formation, Northern Territory

The warming climate was associated with new technologies. Small back-bladed stone tools appeared 15–19 thousand years ago. Wooden javelins and boomerangs have been found dating from 10,000 years ago. Stone points for spears have been found dating from 5–7 thousand years ago. Spear throwers were probably developed more recently than 6,500 years ago.

Sea levels stabilised at around their current level about 6,500 years ago. Warmer weather, wetter conditions and the new coastlines led to significant changes in Aboriginal social and economic organisation. New coastal societies emerged around tidal reefs, estuaries and flooded river valleys, and coastal islands were incorporated into local economies. There was a proliferation of stone tool, plant processing and landscape modification technologies. Elaborate fish and eel traps involving channels up to three kilometres long were in use in western Victoria from about 6,500 years ago. Semi-permanent collections of wooden huts on mounds also appeared in western Victoria, associated with a more systematic exploitation of new food sources in the wetlands.

Aboriginal Tasmanians were isolated from the mainland from about 14,000 years ago. As a result, they only possessed one quarter of the tools and equipment of the adjacent mainland and were without hafted axes, grinding technology, stone tipped weapons, spear throwers and the boomerang. By 3,700 BP they had ceased to eat fish and use bone tools. Coastal Tasmanians switched from fish to abalone and crayfish and more Tasmanians moved to the interior. The Tasmanians built watercraft from reeds and bark and journeyed up to 10 kilometres offshore to visit islands and hunt for seals and muttonbirds.

Oral history demonstrates "the continuity of culture of Indigenous Australians" for at least 10,000 years. This is shown by correlation of oral history stories with verifiable incidents including known changes in sea levels and their associated large changes in location of ocean shorelines; oral records of megafauna; and comets.

Around 4,000 years ago the first phase of occupation of the Torres Strait Islands began. By 2,500 years ago more of the islands were occupied and a distinctive Torres Strait Island maritime culture emerged. Agriculture also developed on some islands and by 700 years ago villages appeared.

=== Ecology ===
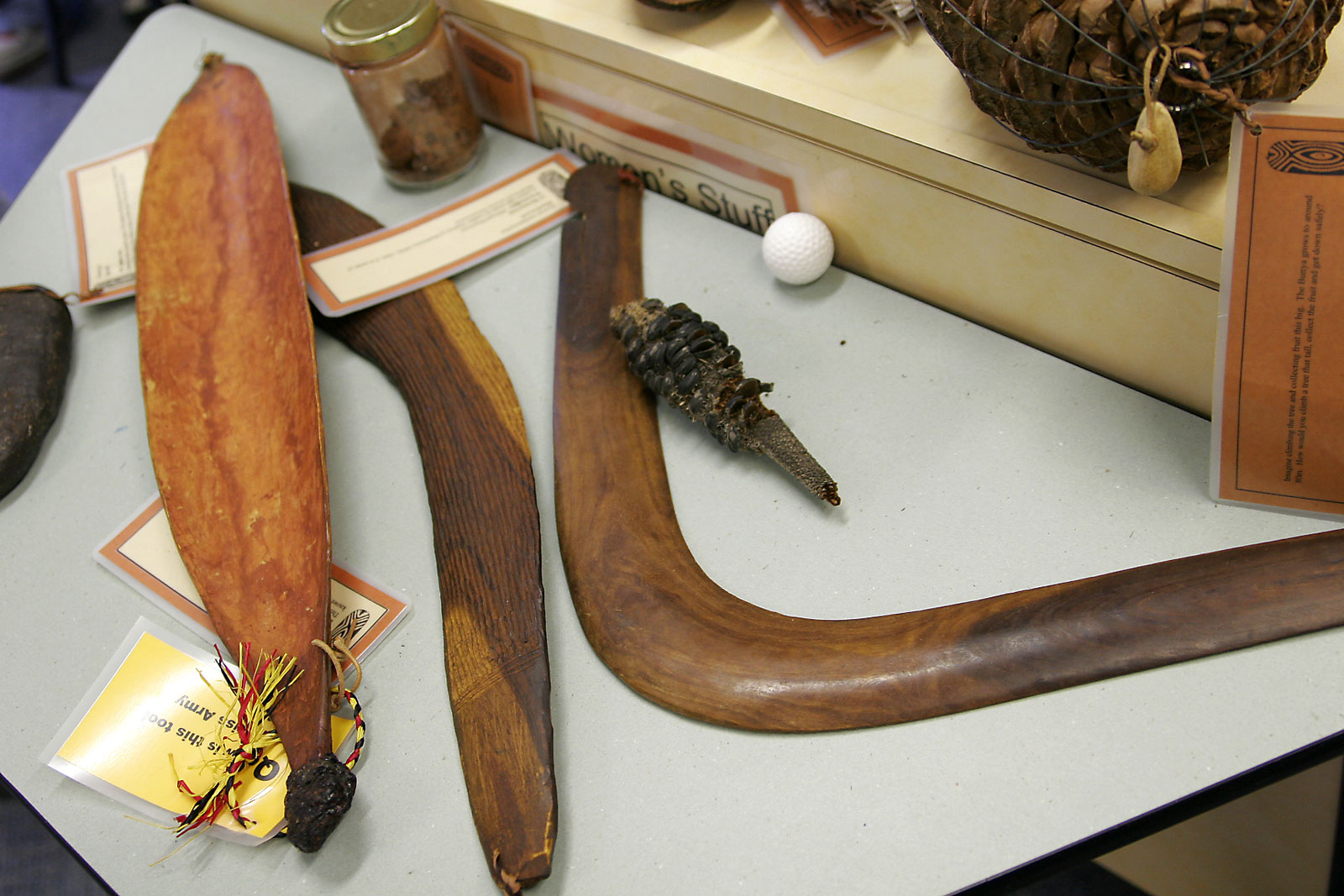
These implements were used only by men. At left, a spear-thrower (called woomera in the Eora language), and two examples of boomerangs. Boomerangs could be used for hunting (most were non-returning), or purely for music and ceremony.

The introduction of the dingo, possibly as early as 3500 BCE, showed that contact with South East Asian peoples continued, as the closest genetic connection to the dingo seems to be the wild dogs of Thailand. This contact was not just one-way, as the presence of kangaroo ticks on these dogs demonstrates. Dingoes began and evolved in Asia. The earliest known dingo-like fossils are from Ban Chiang in north-east Thailand (dated at 5500 years BP) and from north Vietnam (5000 years BP). According to skull morphology, these fossils occupy a place between Asian wolves (prime candidates were the pale footed (or Indian) wolf Canis lupus pallipes and the Arabian wolf Canis lupus arabs) and modern dingoes in Australia and Thailand.

The spread of the population also altered the environment. There is evidence of the deliberate use of fire to shape the Australian environment 46,000 years ago. In many parts of Australia, firestick farming was used to clear vegetation to make travel easier, drive animals into ambushes, and create open grasslands rich in animal and vegetable food sources. More than 60 species of animals, including Australian megafauna, became extinct by 10,000 BP. Researchers have variously attributed these extinctions to human hunting and firing practices, climate change or a combination of these factors.

=== Food ===
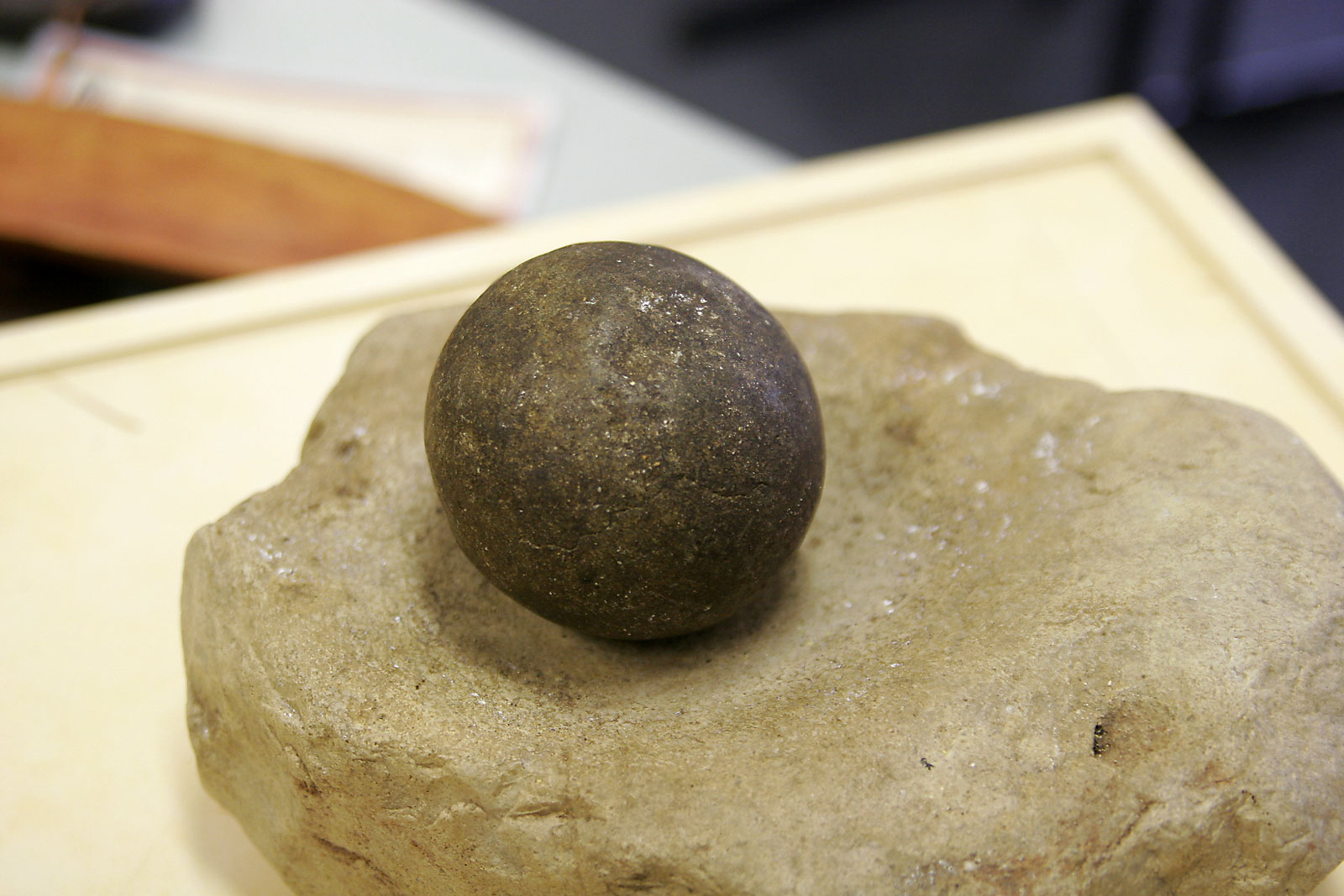
Aboriginal grinding stones—a pestle and mortar—vital in making flours for bush bread. Aboriginal women were experts at making bread from a variety of seasonal grains and nuts.

Aboriginal Australians were limited to the range of foods occurring naturally in their area, but they knew exactly when, where and how to find everything edible. Anthropologists and nutrition experts who have studied the tribal diet in Arnhem Land found it to be well-balanced, with most of the nutrients modern dietitians recommend. But food was not obtained without effort. In some areas both men and women had to spend from half to two-thirds of each day hunting or foraging for food. Each day, the women of the group went into successive parts of one countryside with wooden digging sticks and plaited dilly bags or wooden coolamons. Larger animals and birds, such as kangaroos and emus, were speared or disabled with a thrown club, boomerang, or stone. Many Indigenous hunting devices were used to get within striking distance of prey. The men were excellent trackers and stalkers, approaching their prey running where there was cover, or "freezing" and crawling when in the open. They were careful to stay downwind and sometimes covered themselves with mud to disguise their smell.

Fish were sometimes taken by hand by stirring up the muddy bottom of a pool until they rose to the surface, or by placing the crushed leaves of poisonous plants in the water to stupefy them. Fish spears, nets, wicker or stone traps were also used in different areas. Lines with hooks made from bone, shell, wood or spines were used along the north and east coasts. Dugong, turtle and large fish were harpooned, the harpooner launching himself bodily from the canoe to give added weight to the thrust. Both Torres Strait Island populations and mainland Aboriginal peoples were predominantly hunter & gatherers, who relied on wild foods. However, banana cultivation is now thought to have been practiced amongst Torres Strait Islanders. Aboriginal Australians along the coast and rivers were also expert fishermen. Some Aboriginal and Torres Strait Islander people relied on the dingo as a companion animal, using it to assist with hunting and for warmth on cold nights.

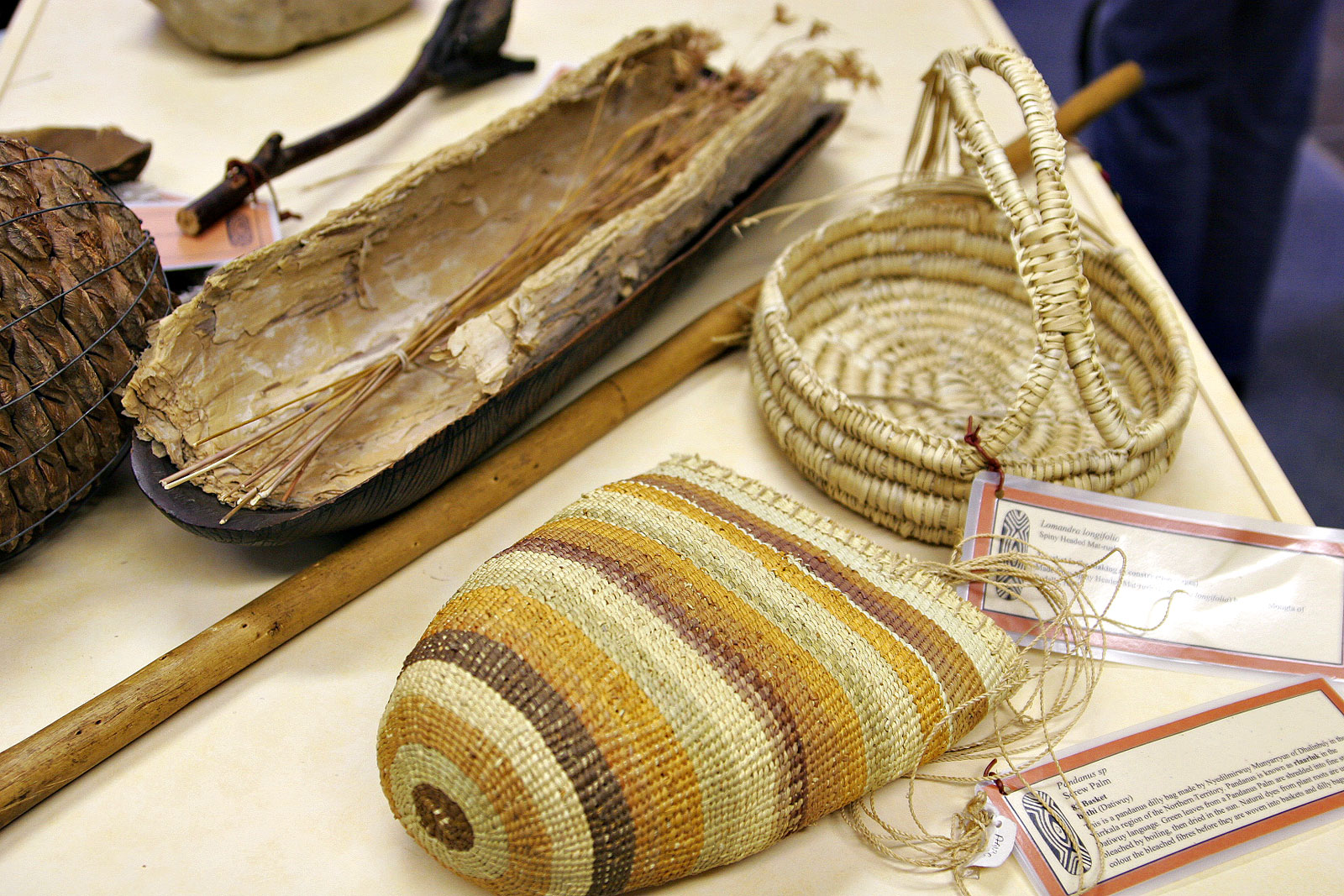
Aboriginal women's implements, including a coolamon lined with paperbark and a digging stick. This woven basket style is from Northern Australia. Baskets were used for collecting fruits, corms, seeds and even water – some baskets were woven so tightly as to be watertight.

In present-day Victoria, there were two separate communities who farmed eels in complex and extensive irrigated pond systems; one on the Murray River in the state's north, the other in the south-west near Hamilton in the territory of the Djab Wurrung, which traded with other groups from as far away as the Melbourne area (see Gunditjmara). A primary tool used in hunting is the spear, launched by a woomera or spear-thrower in some locales. Boomerangs were also used by some mainland Indigenous Australians. The non-returnable boomerang (known more correctly as a Throwing Stick), more powerful than the returning kind, could be used to injure or even kill a kangaroo.

In mainland Australia no animal other than the dingo was domesticated, however domestic pigs and cassowaries were utilised by Torres Strait Islanders. The typical Aboriginal diet included a wide variety of foods, including introduced pigs, kangaroo, emu, wombats, goanna, snakes, birds, and many insects such as honey ants, bogong moths and witchetty grubs. Many varieties of plant foods such as taro, coconuts, nuts, fruits and berries were also eaten.

=== Culture ===
Torres Strait Islanders were culturally and linguistically distinct from mainland Aboriginal peoples. They were seafarers and obtained their livelihood from seasonal horticulture and the resources of their reefs and seas. Villages and agriculture also developed on some islands.

Aboriginal cultures were diverse. The earliest Aboriginal rock art consists of hand-prints, hand-stencils, and engravings of circles, tracks, lines and cupules, and has been dated to 35,000 years ago. Around 20,000 year ago Aboriginal artists were depicting humans and animals. However, the dating is contentious and some researchers believe that known examples of Aboriginal rock art are possibly more recent.

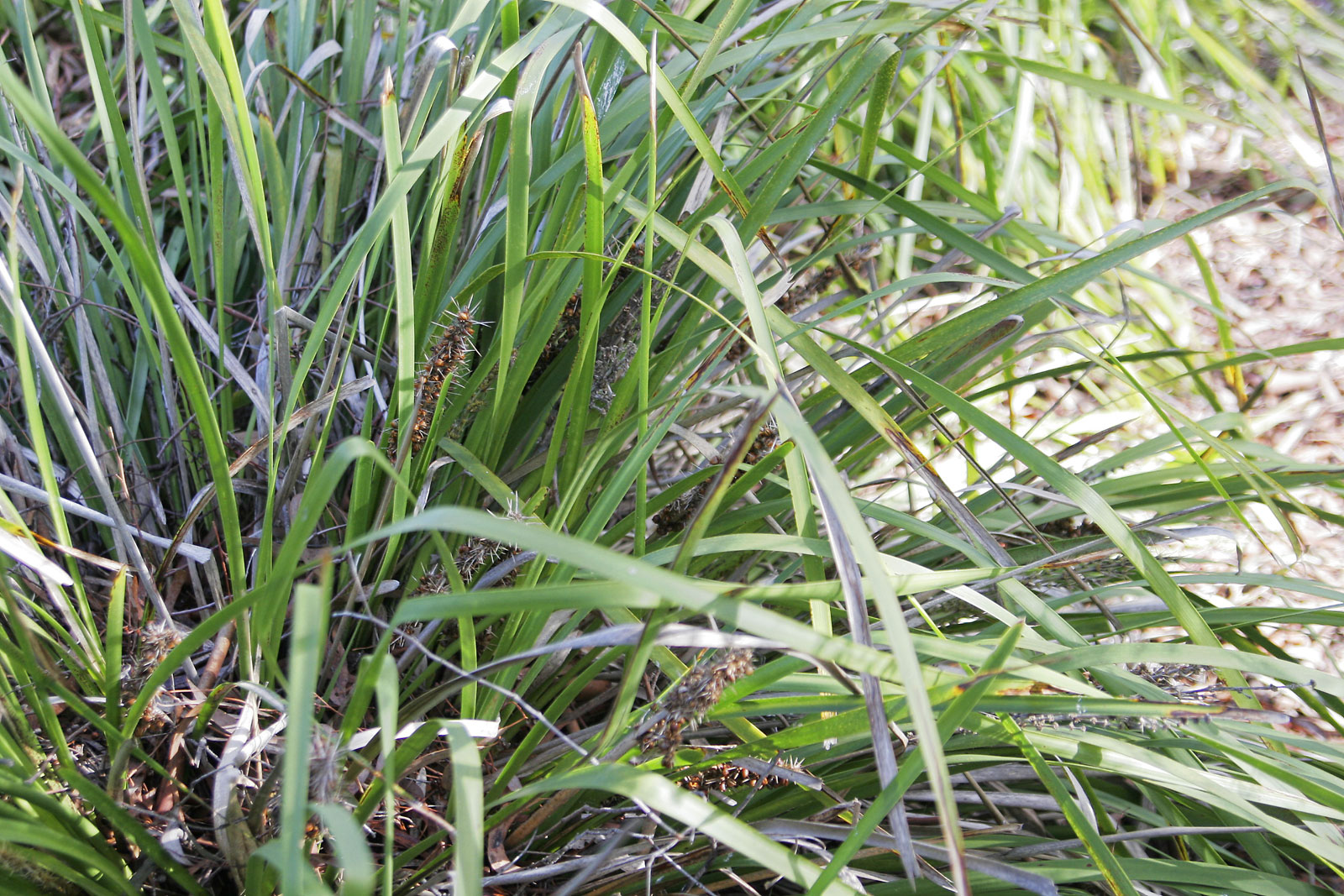
Lomandra, a plant used by Aboriginal Australians for weaving

Some innovations were imported to the mainland from neighbouring cultures. The dingo was introduced about 4,000 years ago. Shell fish hooks appeared in Australia about 1,200 years ago and were probably introduced from the Torres Strait or by Polynesian seafarers. From the mid-1660s fishing vessels from Indonesia regularly visited the north coast of Australia in search of trepang (sea cucumber). Trade and social relationships developed which were reflected in Aboriginal art, ceremonies and oral traditions. Aboriginal people adopted dugout canoes and metal harpoon heads from the Indonesians which allowed them to better hunt dugong and turtle off the coast and nearby islands.

Despite these interactions with neighbouring cultures, the basic structure of Aboriginal society was unchanged. Family groups were joined in bands and clans averaging about 25 people, each with a defined territory for foraging. Clans were attached to tribes or nations, associated with particular languages and country. At the time of European contact there were about 600 tribes or nations and 250 distinct languages with various dialects.

Aboriginal society was egalitarian with no formal government or chiefs. Authority rested with elders who held extensive ritual knowledge gained over many years. Group decisions were generally made through the consensus of elders. The traditional economy was cooperative, with males generally hunting large game while females gathered local staples such as small animals, shellfish, vegetables, fruits, seeds and nuts. Food was shared within groups and exchanged across groups.

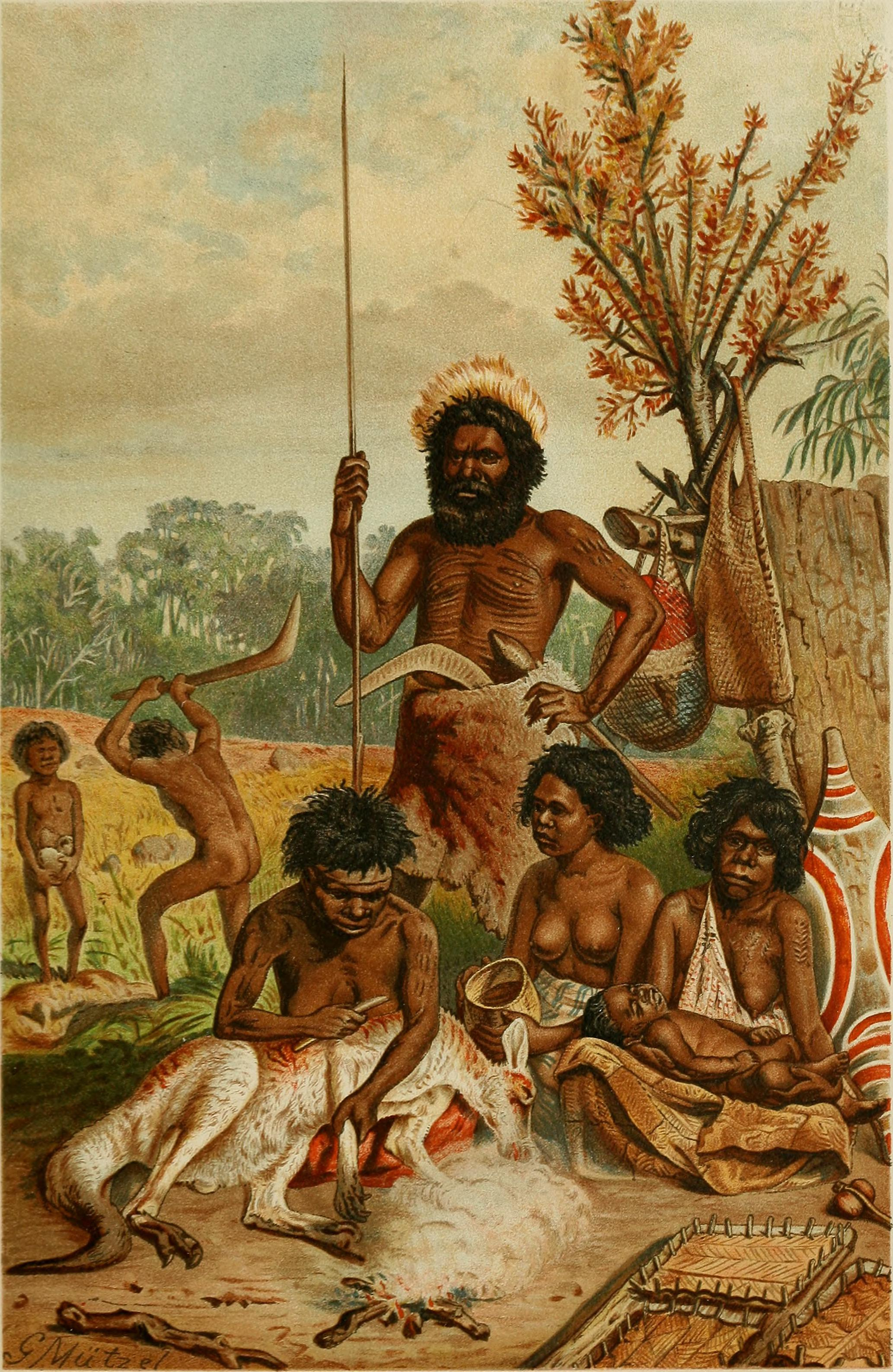
A late 19th-century engraving depicting Indigenous Australians with traditional weapons

Aboriginal groups were semi-nomadic, generally ranging over a specific territory defined by natural features. Members of a group would enter the territory of another group through rights established by marriage and kinship or by invitation for specific purposes such as ceremonies and sharing abundant seasonal foods. As all natural features of the land were created by ancestral beings, a group's particular country provided physical and spiritual nourishment.

According to Australian Aboriginal mythology and the animist framework developed in Aboriginal Australia, the Dreaming is a sacred era in which ancestral totemic spirit beings formed The Creation. The Dreaming established the laws and structures of society and the ceremonies performed to ensure continuity of life and land.

The extent to which some Aboriginal societies were agricultural is controversial. In the Lake Condah region of western Victoria the inhabitants built elaborate eel and fish traps and hundreds gathered in semi-permanent stone and bark huts during the eel season. However, these groups still moved across their territory several times a year to exploit other seasonal food sources. In semi-arid areas, millet was harvested, stacked and threshed and the seeds stored for later use. In tropical areas the tops of yams were replanted. Flood argues that such practices are better classified as resource management than agriculture and that Aboriginal societies did not develop the systematic cultivation of crops or permanent villages such as existed in the Torres Strait Islands. Elizabeth Williams has called the inhabitants of the more settled regions of the Murray valley "complex hunter gatherers".

In many Aboriginal communities a complex kinship structure developed and most groups were divided into two inter-marrying halves called moieties. Polygamy was common, although many marriages were monogamous. To enable men and women to find suitable partners, many groups would come together for annual gatherings (commonly known as corroborees) at which goods were traded, news exchanged, and marriages arranged amid appropriate ceremonies. This practice both reinforced clan relationships and prevented inbreeding in a society based on small semi-nomadic groups.

Male initiation usually occurred at puberty and the rites often included penile subincision, depilation or tooth avulsion. Female initiation often involved purification through smoke or bathing, and sometimes scarification or the removal of finger joints.

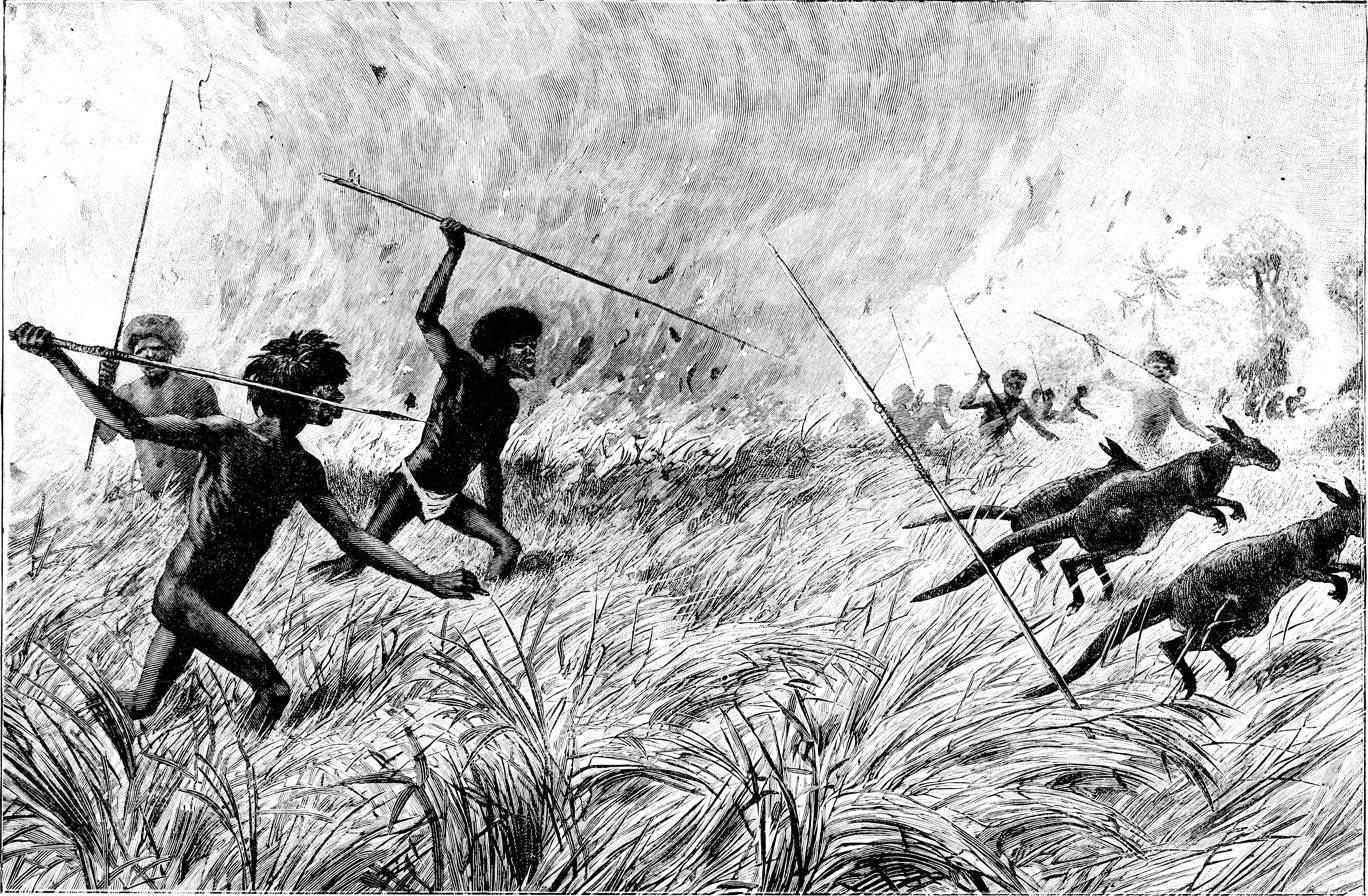
Historical illustration of Indigenous Australians hunting kangaroos with spears

Abortion and infanticide were widely practised as a means of birth control or dealing with deformities, injuries or illness which might impair the functioning of the group.

Some Aboriginal and Torres Strait Islander groups also practised ritual cannibalism in rare circumstances.

Skeletal evidence from regions like the Murray–Darling Basin shows that physical conflict occurred in pre-colonial Aboriginal societies for over 10,000 years and became more common in the last few thousand years. However, most of these injuries came from non-fatal fighting, such as domestic conflict and formal duels to settle disputes, rather than deadly warfare or revenge killings.

=== Health ===
The health of pre-colonial Aboriginal Australians varied between regions. Desert nomads generally had the best health, while those of the central Murray region were the least healthy due to their diet and high population density. Life expectancy has been estimated at about 40 years, which was similar to that of 18th century Europeans. Analysis of the prehistoric burial population at Roonka Flat on the lower Murray River found relatively low survival into older age, with only 5.8% of individuals estimated to have lived beyond 50 years of age and 26% dying between the ages of 31 and 50.

== 1770–1850s: impact of British colonisation ==
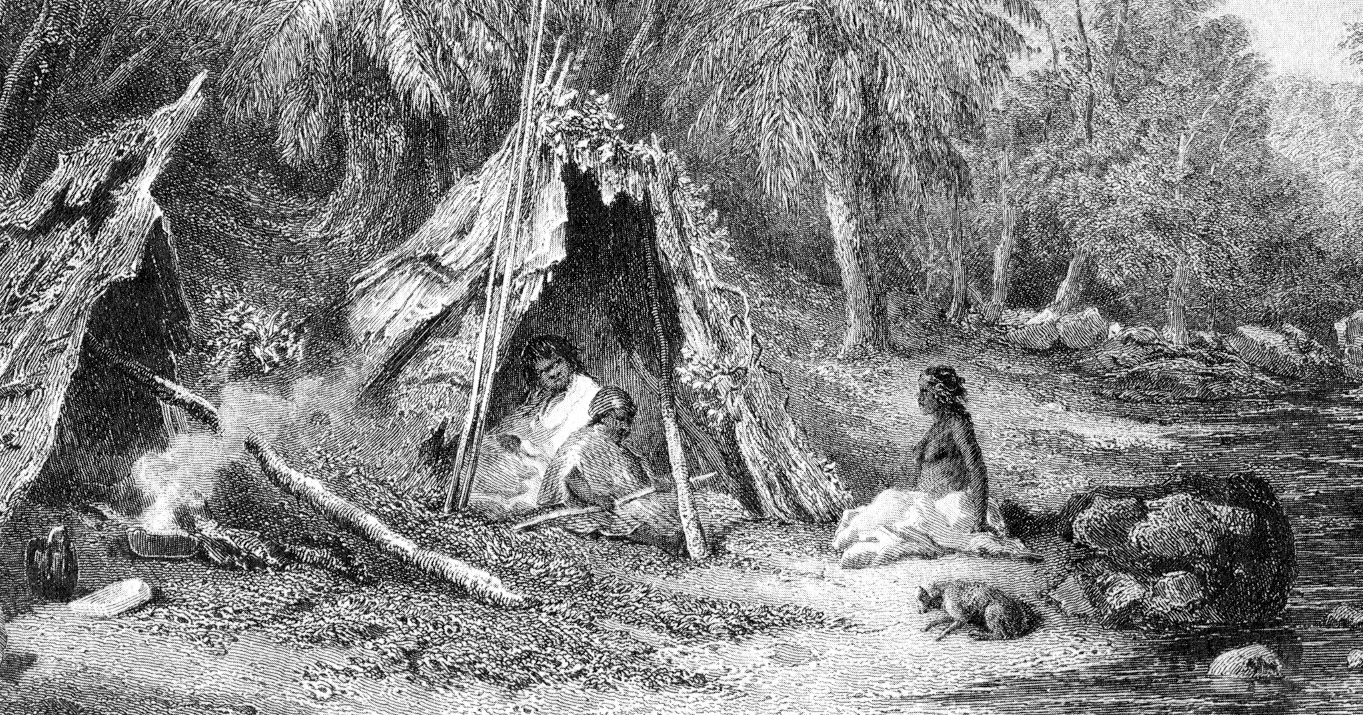
A 19th-century engraving of an Aboriginal Australian encampment, showing the indigenous lifestyle in the cooler parts of Australia at the time of European settlement

The first contact between British explorers and Indigenous Australians came in 1770, when Lieutenant James Cook explored the east coast of Australia. Cook's orders were to look for "a Continent or Land of great extent" and "with the Consent of the Natives to take possession of Convenient situations in the Country in the name of the King". On 29 April, Cook made landfall at a beach now known as Silver Beach on Botany Bay (Kamay Botany Bay National Park). Two Gweagal men of the Dharawal / Eora nation opposed their landing and in the confrontation one of them was shot and wounded.

Cook and his crew stayed at Botany Bay for a week, but his attempts to establish relations with the locals were unsuccessful. Cook then sailed north and, in June, the Guugu Yimidhirr people encountered Cook's party at the mouth of the Endeavour River in what is now Cooktown. Relations were mainly peaceable, although following a dispute over green turtles Cook ordered shots to be fired and one local was lightly wounded. Cook then sailed further north to Possession Island where he claimed the coast he had explored for Britain. Contrary to his instructions, he had not gained the consent of the local inhabitants.

British colonisation of Australia began at Port Jackson in 1788 with the arrival of Governor Arthur Phillip and the First Fleet. The Governor was instructed to "open an intercourse with the natives, and to conciliate their affections, enjoining all our subjects to live in amity and kindness with them" The immediate reaction of the Eora to the arrival of the British was at first surprise and then aggression. Following this the Eora generally avoided the British for the next two years. They were offended by the British entering their lands and taking advantage of their resources without asking permission, as was customary in Aboriginal society. Some contacts did however occur, with both the Eora and the Tharawal at Botany Bay, including exchanges of gifts. Out of the 17 encounters during the first month, only two involved the Eora entering British settlements. After a year, Phillip decided to capture Indigenous people to teach them English and make them intermediaries, resulting in the kidnappings of Arabanoo and Bennelong, with Phillip getting speared by the latter's companion. Bennelong would eventually travel to England with Phillip and Yemmerrawanne in 1793. A Kuringgai man Bungaree also made voyages with Europeans. Following the lethal spearing of a hunter, possibly by Pemulwuy, Phillip ordered 10 men in Botany Bay to be captured and beheaded. None were however found.

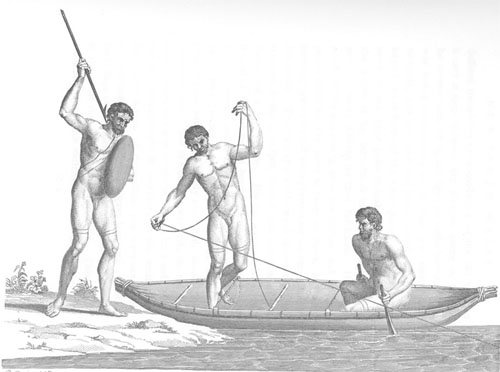
The Natives of Botany Bay by R. Cleveley (1789)

The first apparent consequence of British settlement appeared in April 1789 when a disease, which was probably smallpox, struck the Aboriginal peoples about Port Jackson. Before the epidemic, the First Fleet had equalled the population of the Eora; after it the settler population was equal to all Indigenous people on the Cumberland Plain; and by 1820, their population of 30,000 was as much of the entire Indigenous populace of New South Wales. A generation after colonisation, the Eora, Dharug and Kuringgai had been greatly reduced and were mainly living in the outskirts of European society, though some Indigenous people did continue to live in the coastal regions around Sydney further on, as well as around Georges River and Botany Bay. Further inland, Indigenous peoples were warned of the British invasion after the Cumberland Plain had been taken by 1815, and this information preceded them by hundreds of kilometres. However, by the second generation of contact, many groups in south-eastern Australia were gone. The greatest cause of death was disease, followed by settler and inter-Indigenous killings. This population loss was further exacerbated by an extremely low birth rate. An estimated decline of 80 percent in the population meant that traditional kinship systems and ceremonial obligations became hard to maintain and family and social relations were torn. The survivors came to live on the fringes of European society, living in tents and shacks around towns and riverbanks in poor health.

Aboriginal Tasmanians first came to contact with Europeans when the Baudin expedition to Australia arrived at Adventure Bay in 1802. The French explorers were more friendly to the Indigenous than the British further north. Already earlier, in 1800, European whalers had been to the Bass Strait islands, where they had used kidnapped aboriginal women. The local Indigenous also sold women to the sailors. Later the descendants of these women would be the last survivors of Tasmanian Indigenous people.

=== Assimilation ===
The assimilation policy was first started by Governor Macquarie, who established in 1814 the Native Institution in Blacktown "to effect the Civilization of the Aborigines of New South Wales, and to render their Habits more domesticated and industrious" by enrolling children in a residential school. By 1817, 17 were enrolled, one of whom, a girl called Maria, won the first prize in a school exam ahead of European children in 1819. The institution was however closed soon after following Macquarie's replacement for spending. Macquerie also had attempted to settle 16 Kuringgai at George's Head with land, pre-fabricated huts and other supplies, but the families had soon sold the farms and left.

Christian missions were also started at Lake Macquarie in 1827, at Wellington Valley in 1832, and in Port Phillip and Moreton Bay around 1840. These involved learning Indigenous languages, with the Gospel of Luke translated into Awabakal in 1831 by a missionary and Biraban, as well as offering food and sanctuary on the frontier. However, when supplies ran out, the Indigenous would often leave for pastoral stations in search of work. Some missionaries would take children without consent to be taught in dormitories.

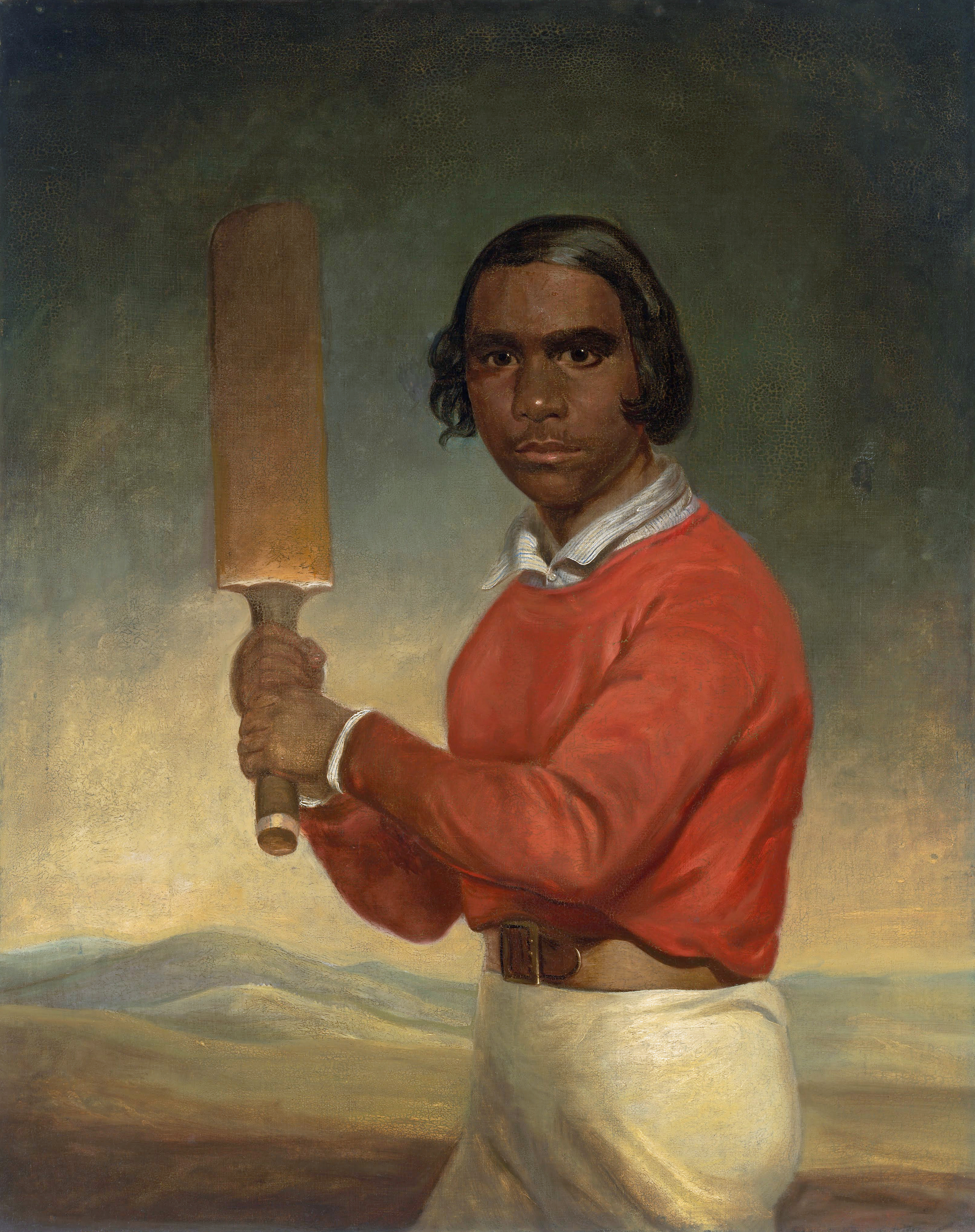
This portrait of a young Indigenous boy was commissioned by a member of a Christian mission station to show the achievements of the mission at "civilising" the Indigenous population.

The government had started blanket distribution in the 1830s, but ended this in 1844 as a cost-saving measure. It also created Indigenous paramilitary units, called the Australian native police, with these being establish in Port Phillip in 1842, New South Wales in 1848, and in Queensland 1859. Exceptional among these, the Port Phillip force had police powers over white people as well. The forces killed hundreds of (or in the case of Queensland, up to a thousand) Indigenous people.

In 1833, a committee of the British House of Commons, led by Fowell Buxton, demanded better treatment of the Indigenous, referring to them as 'original owners', leading the British government in 1838 to create the office of the Protector of Aborigines. However, this effort ended by 1857. Nevertheless, the humanitarian effort did produce the Waste Land Act 1848, which gave indigenous people certain rights and reserves on the land.

There was also some assimilation of Europeans into Indigenous cultures. Living with Indigenous people was William Buckley, an escaped convict, who was with the Wautharong people near Melbourne for thirty-two years, before being found in 1835. James Morrill was an English sailor aboard the vessel Peruvian which became shipwrecked off the coast of north-eastern Australia in 1846, was taken in by a local clan of Aboriginal Australians. He adopted their language and customs and lived as a member of their society for 17 years. Indigenous peoples also adopted the European dog widely.

=== Conflict ===
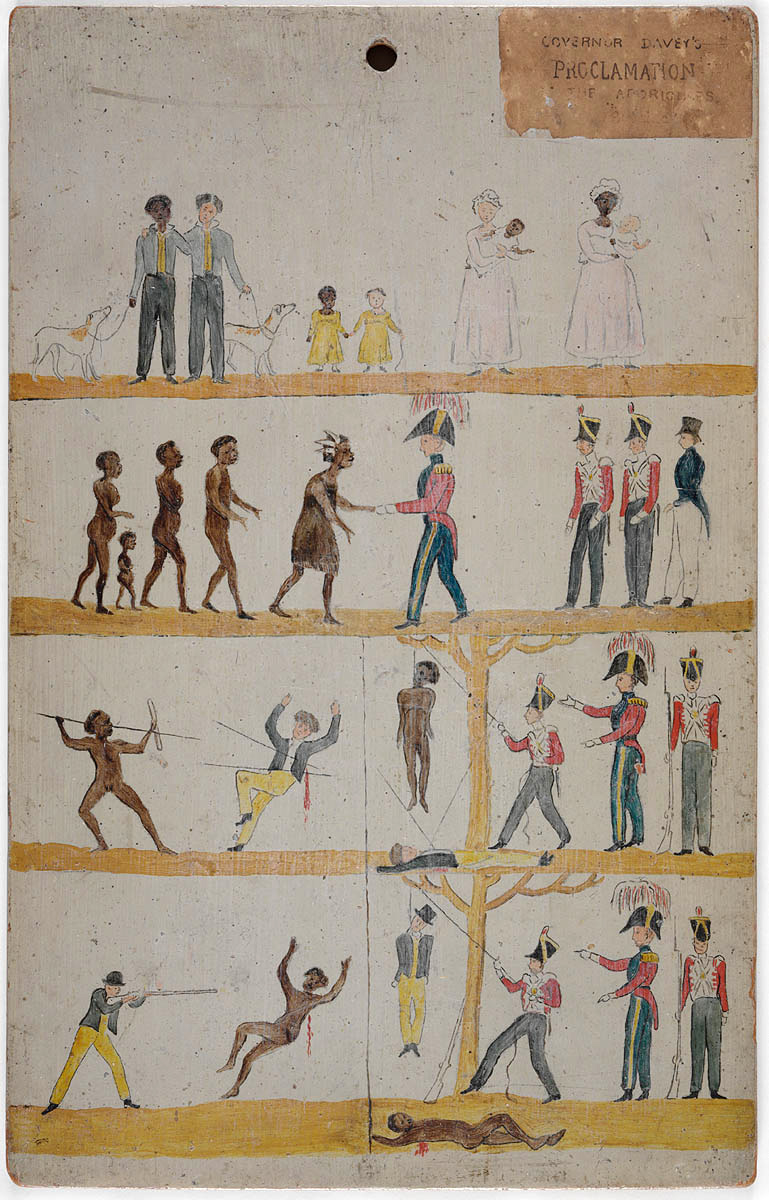
Governor Davey's proclamation of protection for the Indigenous in Van Diemen's Land, 1816

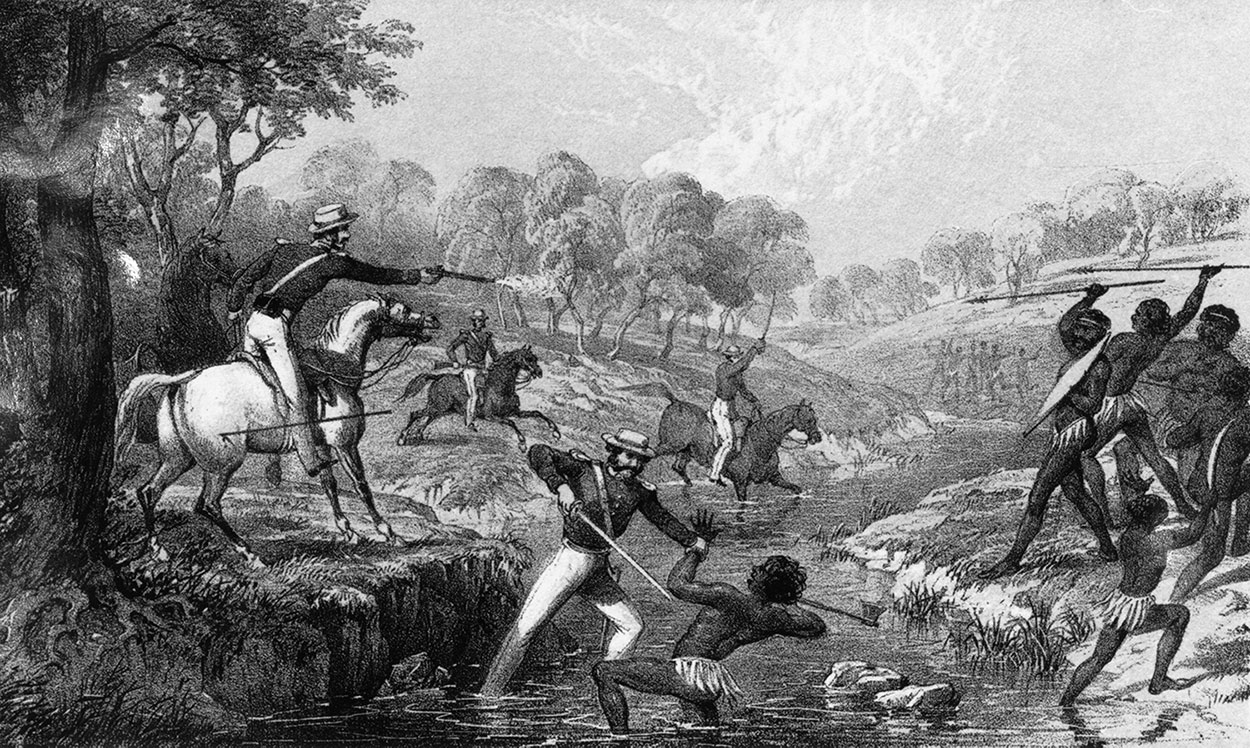
New South Wales Mounted Police killing Aboriginal warriors during the Waterloo Creek massacre, 1838

The British settlement was initially planned to be a self-sufficient penal colony based on agriculture. Karskens argues that conflict broke out between the settlers and the traditional owners of the land because of the settlers' assumptions about the superiority of British civilisation and their entitlement to land which they had "improved" through building and cultivation.

Broome argues that the British claims of exclusive possession to land and other property was irreconcilable with Aboriginal concepts of communal ownership of land and its food resources. Flood points out that conflict between British law and Aboriginal customary law was also a source of conflict; for example, Aboriginal groups considered they had a right to hunt all animals on their traditional land whereas British settlers considered the killing of their livestock as poaching. Conflict also arose from cross-cultural misunderstandings and from reprisals for previous actions such as the kidnapping of Aboriginal men, women and children. Reprisal attacks and collective punishments were perpetrated by colonists and Aboriginal groups alike. Sustained Aboriginal attacks on settlers, the burning of crops and the mass killing of livestock were more obviously acts of resistance to the loss of traditional land and food resources.

On the mainland, prolonged conflict followed the frontier of European settlement. Broome estimates the total death toll from settler-Aboriginal conflict between 1788 and 1928 as 1,700 settlers and 17–20,000 Aboriginal people. Reynolds has suggested a higher "guesstimate" of 3,000 settlers and up to 30,000 Aboriginals killed. A project team at the University of Newcastle, Australia, has reached a preliminary estimate of 8,270 Aboriginal deaths in frontier massacres from 1788 to 1930.

Some Indigenous people also allied with the colonists against other Indigenous people. Colonisation accelerated fighting between Indigenous groups by causing them to leave their traditional lands as well as by causing deaths by disease which were attributed to enemy sorcery. Indigenous gun ownership was banned in New South Wales in 1840, but this was overturned by the British government as inequality before the law.

In 1790, an Aboriginal leader Pemulwuy in Sydney resisted the Europeans, waging a guerrilla-style warfare on the settlers in a series of wars known as the Hawkesbury and Nepean Wars, which spanned 26 years, from 1790 to 1816. After his death in 1802, his son Tedbury continued the campaign until 1810. The campaign led to the banning of Aboriginal groups of more than six and forbid them from carrying weapons closer to two kilometers from settlements. Beyond the Cumberland Plain, violence erupted first at Bathurst against the Wiradjuri, with martial law declared in 1822 and the 40th Regiment responding. This became known as the Bathurst War.

In Van Diemen's Land, conflict arrived in 1824 after major expansion of settler and sheep numbers, with Indigenous warriors responding by killing 24 Europeans by 1826. In 1828, martial law was declared and bounty parties of settlers took vengeance. On the Indigenous side, Musquito led the Oyster Bay tribe against the settlers. Tarenorerer was another leader. The Black War, fought largely as a guerrilla war by both sides, claimed the lives of 600 to 900 Aboriginal people and more than 200 European colonists, nearly annihilating the island's indigenous population. The near-destruction of the Aboriginal Tasmanians, and the frequent incidence of mass killings, has sparked debate among historians over whether the Black War should be defined as an act of genocide.

In Swan River Colony, conflict occurred near Perth, with the government offering the use of the armoury for the settlers. A punitive party was led against the Pindjarup in 1834.

=== Diseases ===
Deadly infectious diseases like smallpox, influenza and tuberculosis were always major causes of Aboriginal deaths. Smallpox alone killed more than 50% of the Aboriginal population. Other diseases included dysentery, scarlet fever, typhus, measles, whooping cough and influenza. Sexually transmitted infections were also introduced by colonialism. Health decline was also caused by increasing use of flour and sugar instead of more diverse traditional diets, resulting in malnutrition. Alcohol was also first introduced by colonialism, leading to alcoholism.

In April 1789, a major outbreak of smallpox killed large numbers of Indigenous Australians between Hawkesbury River, Broken Bay, and Port Hacking. Based on information recorded in the journals of some members of the First Fleet, it has been surmised that the Aboriginal peoples of the Sydney region had never encountered the disease before and lacked immunity to it. Unable to understand or counter the sickness, they often fled, leaving the sick with some food and water to fend for themselves. As the clans fled, the epidemic spread further along the coast and into the hinterland. This had a disastrous effect on Aboriginal society; with many of the productive hunters and gatherers dead, those who survived the initial outbreak began to starve.

Some have suggested that Makasar fishermen accidentally brought smallpox to Australia's north and the virus travelled south. However, given that the spread of the disease depends on high population densities, and the fact that those who succumbed were soon incapable of walking, such an outbreak was unlikely to have spread across the desert trade routes. A more likely source of the disease was the "variolas matter" Surgeon John White brought with him on the First Fleet, although it is unknown how this may have been spread. It has also been speculated that the vials were either accidentally or intentionally released as a "biological weapon". In 2014, writing in Journal of Australian Studies, Christopher Warren concluded that British marines were most likely to have spread smallpox, possibly without informing Governor Phillip, but conceded in his conclusion that "today's evidence only provides for a balancing of probabilities and this is all that can be attempted."

=== Economy and environment ===
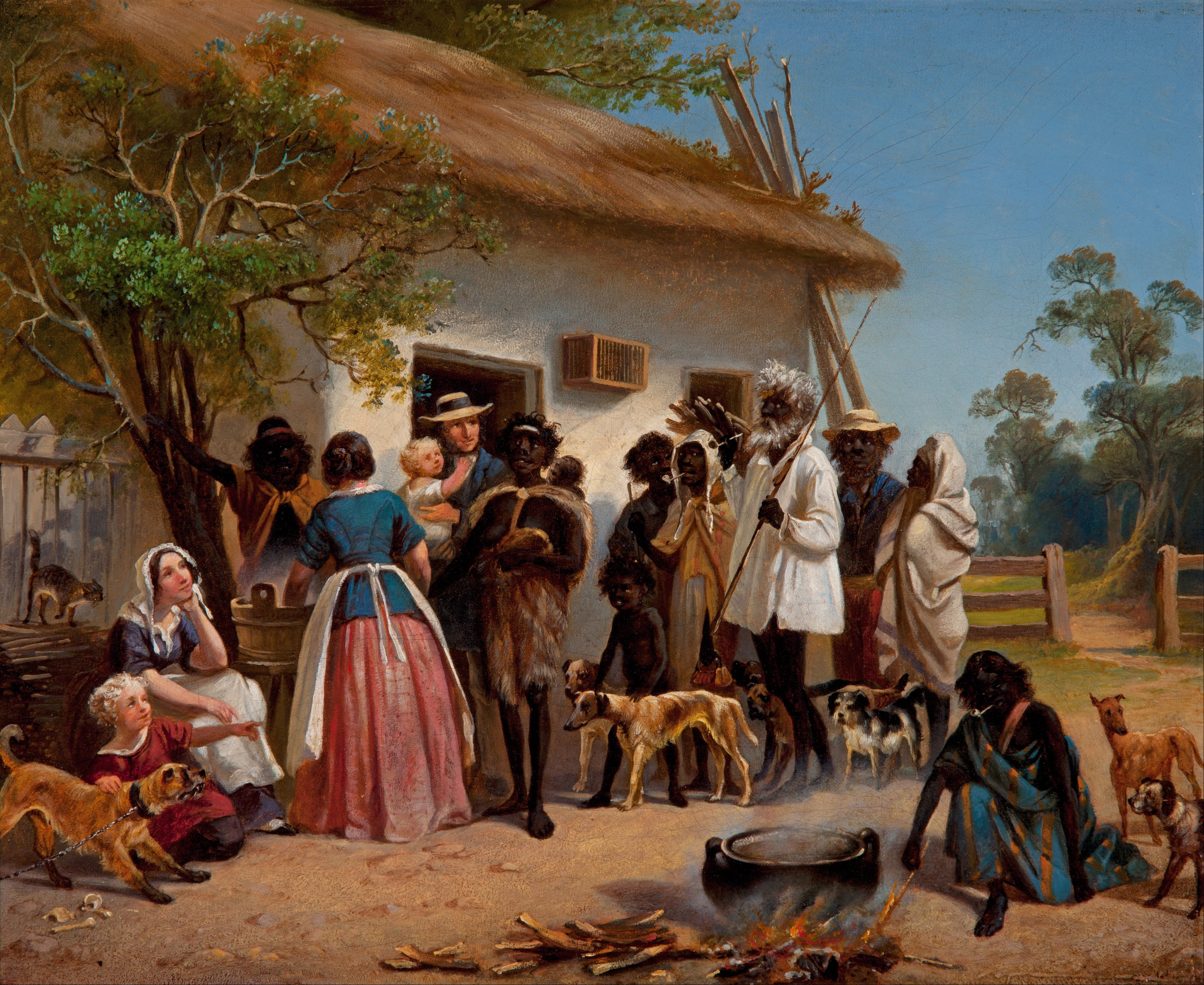
Alexander Schramm's A Scene in South Australia (1850) depicts European settlers with Aboriginals

In 1822, the British government reduced duties on Australian wool, leading to an expansion of sheep numbers, followed by increased immigration. The sheep flourished in the arid western plains. The settlers created an ecological revolution, as their cattle ate away local grasses and trampled waterholes, with precious food staples like murnong diminished, and with new weeds spreading. Meat sources like kangaroo and the Australian brushturkey were replaced by cattle. In response, Indigenous peoples would appropriate settler resources, such as taking sheep and raising their own flocks. New economic products also disrupted traditional lifestyles, as for example in the case of the steel axe, which replaced the traditional stone one, resulting in a loss of authority to the older men who traditionally had access to them. The new axes would be given to younger people by settlers and missionaries in exchange for work, also diminishing old trading networks.

Following the loss of lands, Indigenous people 'came in' to pastoral station, missions and towns, often forced by lack of food. Tobacco, tea and sugar were also important in attracting Indigenous people to settlers. After some handouts, work was demanded by the settlers in return for rations, leading to Indigenous employment in cutting timber, herding and shearing sheep, and in stock work. They were also working as fishermen, water carriers, domestic servants, boatmen and whalers. However, European work ethic was not part of their culture, as working beyond the amount necessary for future benefits was seen as not important. Their pay was also unequal to that of settlers, being mostly rations or less than half the wage. Women had previously been the main providers in Indigenous families, but their roles were diminished as men became the main recipients of wages and rations, while women could at most find European-style domestic work or prostitution, leading some to live with European men who had access to resources.

== 1850s–1940s: northern expansion ==
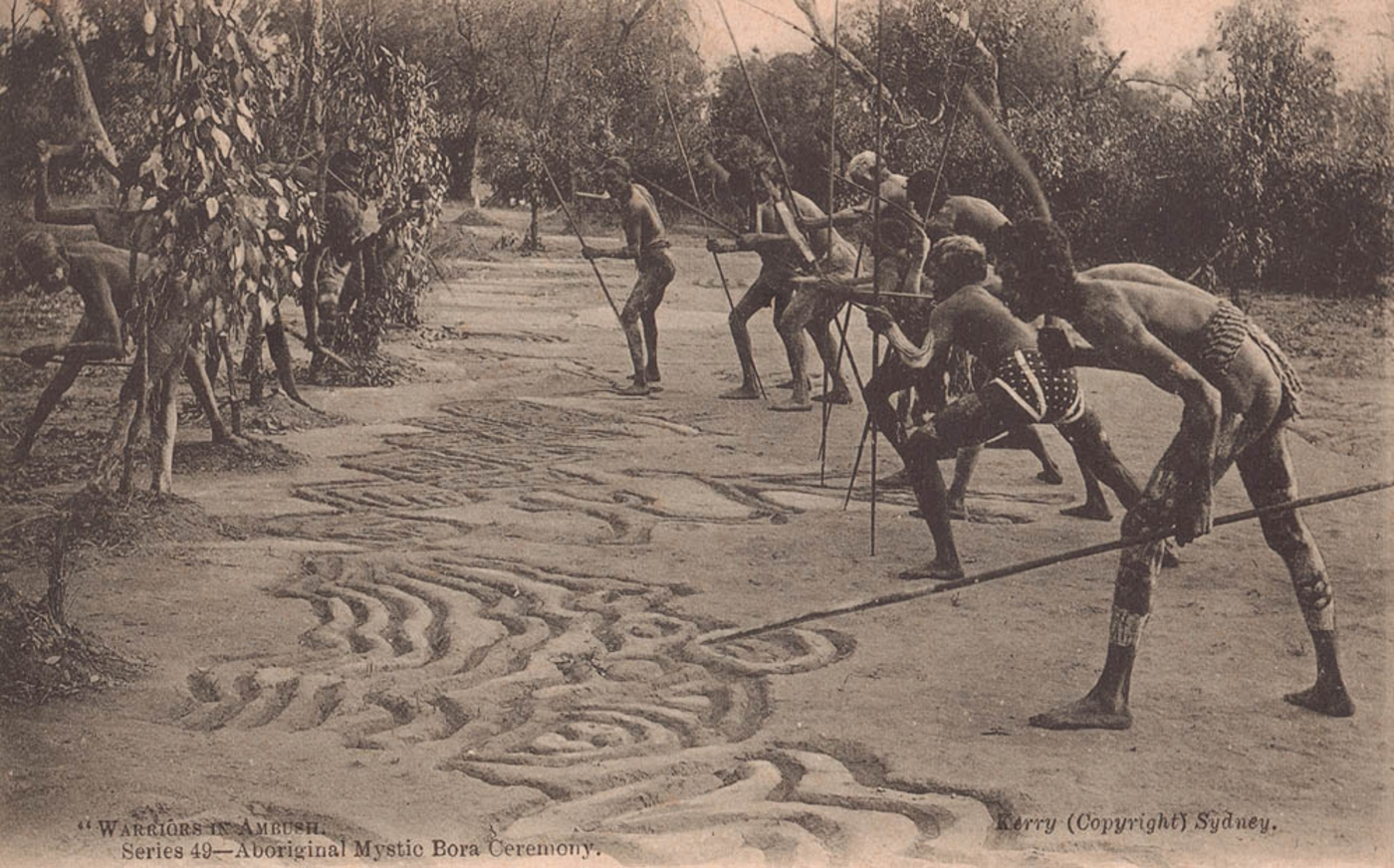
Aboriginal Bora ceremony (early 20th century)

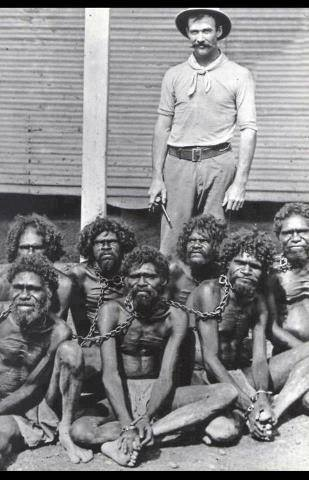
Aboriginal men in chains at Wyndham prison, c.1901.

By 1850, southern Australia had been settled by the new immigrants and their descendants, except for the Great Victoria Desert, Nullarbor Plain, Simpson Desert, and Channel Country. European explorers had started to venture into these areas, as well as the Top End and Cape York Peninsula. By 1862 they had crossed the continent and entered Kimberley and Pilbara, while consolidating colonial claims in the process. Indigenous reaction to them ranged from assistance to hostility. Any new lands were claimed, mapped and opened to pastoralists, with North Queensland settled in the 1860s, Central Australia and the Northern Territory in the 1870s, Kimberley in the 1880s, and the Wunaamin Miliwundi Ranges after 1900. This again led to violent confrontation with the Indigenous peoples. However, because of the dryness and remoteness of the new frontier, settlement and economic development were slower. The European population therefore remained small and consequently more fearful, with few police protecting the Indigenous population. It is estimated that in North Queensland 15 percent of the first wave of pastoralists were killed in Indigenous attacks, while 10 times more of the other side met the same fate. In the Gulf Country, over 400 violent Indigenous deaths were recorded 1872 to 1903.

In the earlier settled southern parts of Australia, an estimated 20,000 Indigenous individuals (10 percent of the total at the beginning of colonisation), remained by the 1920s, with half being of mixed ancestry. There were about 7,000 in New South Wales, 5,000 in southern Queensland, 2,500 in south-west Western Australia, 1,000 in southern South Australia, 500 in Victoria, and under 200 in Tasmania (mostly on Cape Barren Island). One fifth lived in reserves, while most of the rest were in camps around country towns, with small numbers owning farms or living in towns or capital cities. In the country as a whole, there were about 60,000 Indigenous people in 1930.

Foreign pearlers moved into the Torres Strait Islands from 1868 bringing exotic diseases which halved the Indigenous population. In 1871, the London Missionary Society began operating in the islands and most Torres Strait Islanders converted to Christianity which they considered compatible with their beliefs. Queensland annexed the islands in 1879.

The Defence Act 1903 only allowed those of "European origin or descent" to enlist in military service. However, in 1914 around 800 Aboriginal people answered the call to arms to fight in World War I. As the war continued, these restrictions were relaxed as more recruits were needed. Many enlisted by claiming they were Māori or Indian. During World War II, after the threat of Japanese invasion of Australia, Indigenous enlistment was accepted. Up to 3000 individuals of mixed descent served in the military, including Reg Saunders, the first indigenous officer. The Torres Strait Light Infantry Battalion, Northern Territory Special Reconnaissance Unit, and the Snake Bay Patrol were also established. Another 3000 civilians worked in labour corps.

=== Employment, wagelessness and resistance ===
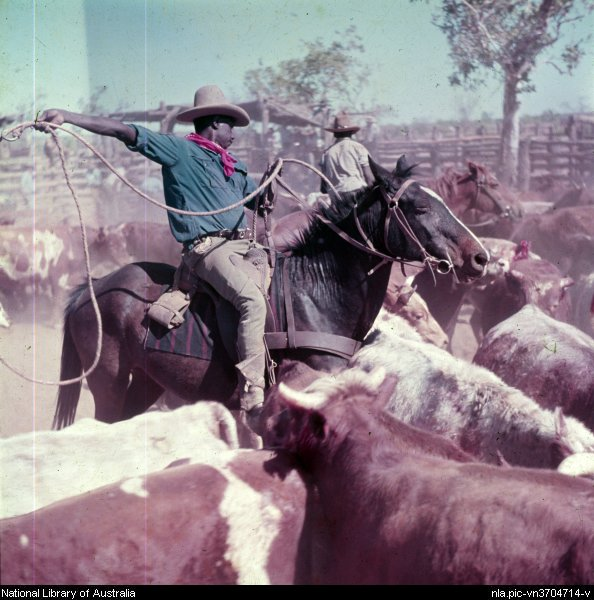
Indigenous Australian stockman at Victoria River Downs Station

Nevertheless, Indigenous workers in the north were able to find jobs better than in south since there was no cheap convict labour available, though they were not paid in wages and were abused. There was a widely held belief that white people could not work in Northern Australia. Pearl hunting employed Aboriginal and Torres Strait Islander workers, though many were coerced into it. By the 1880s, the introduction of diving suits had reduced Indigenous workers to deckhands. Otherwise Indigenous people congregated at settlements such as Broome (servicing luggers) or Darwin (where 20 percent of the Northern Territory's Indigenous workers were employed). However, in Darwin the Indigenous workers were kept locked up at night. Most of the Indigenous workers in North Queensland, the Northern Territory, and the Kimberley were employed by the cattle industry. Wage payment varied by state. In Queensland, wages were paid from 1901 onwards, being set at a third of white wages in 1911, two-thirds in 1918, and equal in 1930. However, some of the wages were deposited on trust accounts, from which they could be stolen. In the Northern Territory, there was no requirement to pay a wage. Overall, up to the Second World War about half of the Indigenous stockmen received wages, and if so, they were well below the white level. There was also physical abuse of the workers, sometimes by the police.

On 4 February 1939, Jack Patten led a strike at Cummeragunja Station in New South Wales. The people of Cummeragunja were protesting their harsh treatment under what was a draconian system. A once successful farming enterprise was taken from their control, and residents were forced to subsist on meagre rations. Approximately 200 people left their homes, taking part in the Cummeragunja walk-off, and the majority crossed the border into Victoria, never to return home. Following the rising threat from the Empire of Japan, the Australian Army came to the north in the early 1940s, bringing new people and ideas while employing Indigenous workers in defence projects. They were paid a wage and mixed with the regular troops. This led the Northern Territory administration to investigate and recommend paying wages, though it was never enforced. Following meetings held in 1942, Indigenous groups in Pilbara decided to go on strike, which they did after the end of the war in the 1946 Pilbara strike. In 1949, they won a wage double the size of their original demand, and were encouraged to start their own co-operative based on the mining they had been doing while on strike. Along with the war, this event also helped reduce the abuse of Indigenous workers.

=== Racism and the early civil rights movement ===
As scientific racism developed from Darwinism (with Charles Darwin himself having claimed after visiting New South Wales that the death of "the Aboriginal" was a consequence of natural selection), the popular view of Indigenous Australians started to see them as inferior. Indigenous Australians were considered in the global scientific community as the world's most primitive humans, leading to trade of human remains and relics. This was especially true of Indigenous Tasmanians, with 120 books and articles written by scholars around the world by the late 19th century. Some Indigenous people were also toured and exhibited around the world as spectacles. However, in the 1930s, physical anthropology was taken over by cultural anthropology, which focused cultural difference over inferiority. Alfred Radcliffe-Brown, the father of modern social anthropology, published his Social Organization of Australian Tribes in 1931.

By 1900 most white Australians held racist views of the Indigenous peoples, and the Constitution of Australia of that year did not count them alongside other Australians in the census. Racist treatment was also encoded in special Acts governing Indigenous peoples separately from the rest of society. Racism also manifested itself in everyday discrimination, which was termed the "colour bar or the caste barrier". This affected life in most settled parts of Australia, though not that much in the capital cities. For example, from the 1890s to 1949, the New South Wales government removed Indigenous children from state schools if non-Indigenous parents objected to their presence, placing them instead to reserve schools with worse education. The same policy was in place in Western Australia, as well, where only one percent of Indigenous children attended state schools. Indigenous residents of New South Wales were also not permitted to buy or drink alcohol. These kinds of restrictions did not apply in Victoria, with a smaller Indigenous population and an assimilationist policy. Furthermore, Indigenous people were often excluded from organisations, businesses, and sports or recreational facilities, such as pools. Employment and housing was difficult to find for them.

Women's groups, such as the Australian Federation of Women Voters and the National Council of Women of Australia, became advocates for Indigenous issues in the 1920s. The first Indigenous political organisation was the Australian Aboriginal Progressive Association, established in 1924, with 11 branches and more than 500 Indigenous members in a year. It had been partly inspired by Marcus Garvey. In 1926, the Native Union in Western Australia was founded. White advocate groups emerged in the 1930s. Other Indigenous organisations included the Euralian Association set up in 1934, the Australian Aborigines' League in 1934, and the Aborigines Progressive Association in 1937. The latter marked Invasion Day on the 150th anniversary of the First Fleet's landing.

=== Reserves and protection boards ===
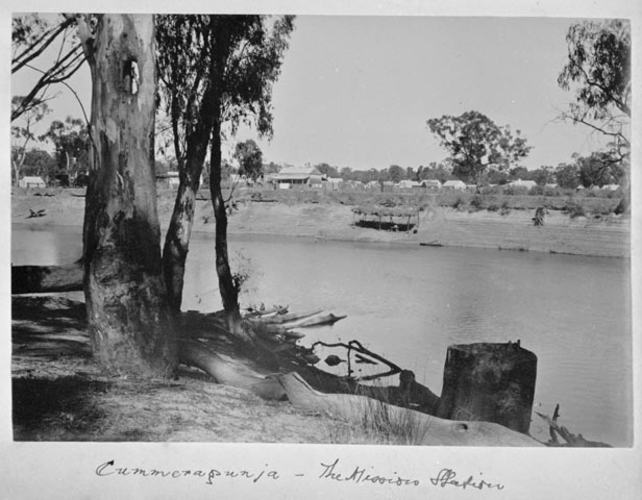
Cummeragunja Aboriginal Mission Station in 1893

The only known treaty between Indigenous and European Australians was Batman's Treaty, signed by Billibellary. His son, Simon Wonga, and other Kulin nation leaders requested land in 1859 for cultivation, and were granted 1820 hectares in the Acheron River by the Victorian government. In 1860, the same government established Aboriginal reserves in Coranderrk, Framlingham, Lake Condah, Ebenezer, Ramahyuck, as well as Lake Tyers. Corranderrk was notably successful, becoming practically self-sufficient and winning the first prize for their hops at the Melbourne International Exhibition. Nevertheless, the inhabitants were refused to be given individual land titles or be paid wages. In South Australia, Raukkan and Poonindie were also set up as communities for Indigenous peoples. In New South Wales, such communities included Maloga, Brungle, Warangesda, and Cummeragunja.

However, the reserve system also gave authorities power over Indigenous people, with the Aboriginal Protection Board exercising control over work and wages, adult movement, and child removal in Victoria from 1869 onwards. With the Aboriginal Protection Act 1886, the Victorian government started removing those with partial European ancestry from the reserves, with the claimed aim to "merge the half-caste population into the general community", which was also followed in New South Wales with the Aborigines Protection Act 1909. This had deleterious consequences for the viability of the communities, leading to their decline. The Queensland Aboriginals Protection and Restriction of the Sale of Opium Act 1897 became a model for Indigenous legislation in Western Australia (1905), South Australia (1911), and the Northern Territory (1911), which gave the authorities power over anyone deemed "Aboriginal" in regards to placing them or their children in reserves, denying voting rights or the ability to buy alcohol, as well as prohibiting interracial sexual relations (requiring a ministerial permission for interracial marriage).

The reserves were subsequently mostly reduced, closed and sold off by the 1920s. Meanwhile, the Protection Boards became more powerful in 1915 in New South Wales after new legislation gave them the power to remove children of mixed ancestry without parental or court approval. Later research shows that the authorities aimed to reunite white families without doing so for Indigenous ones. Overall Indigenous communities in south-eastern Australia became increasingly under government control, with a dependence on weekly rations instead of agricultural work. The 1897 Queensland Act and its subsequent amendments gave reserve superintendents the right to search people and their dwellings or belongings, to confiscate their property and read their mail, as well as to expel them to other reserves, among other powers. The inhabitants had to work 32 hours a week without pay, and were subject to verbal abuse, while their traditions were prohibited.

== 1940s–present: political activism and equality ==
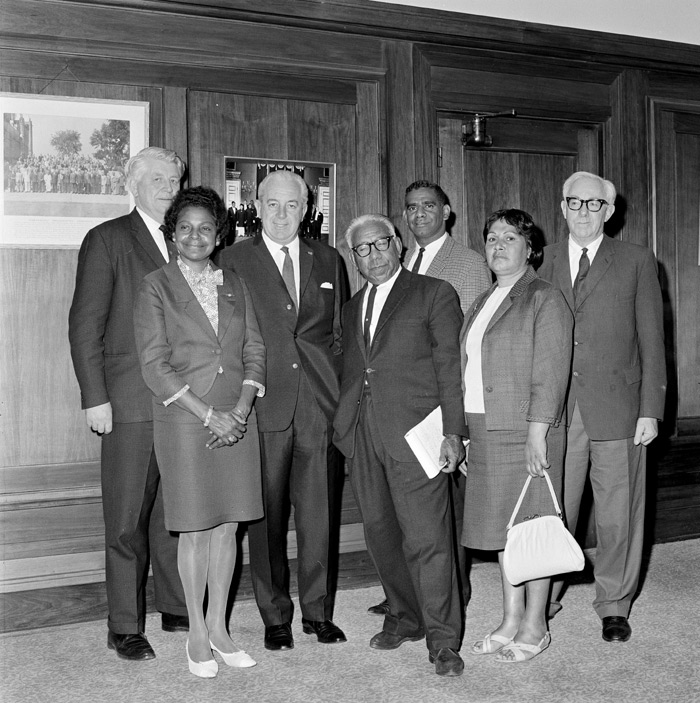
Prime Minister Harold Holt with Aboriginal rights campaigners ahead of the 1967 Referendum.

World War II led to improvements and new opportunities in Indigenous lives through employment in the services and war time industries. After the war, full employment continued, with 96 percent of New South Wales' Indigenous population being employed in 1948. The Commonwealth Child Endowment, as well as the Invalid and Old Age Pensions, were expanded to Indigenous people outside of reserves during the war, though full inclusiveness only followed by 1966. The 1940s also saw individuals given the ability to apply for freedom from Aboriginal Acts, though onerous conditions kept the numbers relatively low. The Nationality and Citizenship Act of 1948 also gave citizenship to any Indigenous people born in Australia. In 1949, the right to vote in federal elections was extended to Indigenous Australians who had served in the armed forces, or were enrolled to vote in state elections.

The postwar era also saw the increased removal of children under assimilationist policies, with between 10 and 33 percent of Aboriginal children being removed from their families between 1910 and 1970. The number may have been more than 70,000 across 70 years. By 1961, the Aboriginal population had risen to 106,000. This went hand-in-hand with urbanization, with the population in capital cities increasing by the 1960s with 12,000 in Sydney, 5000 in Brisbane and 2000 in Melbourne.

In 1962, the Federal Council for the Advancement of Aborigines and Torres Strait Islanders started advocating for wage equality, successfully pressuring the Australian Council of Trade Unions to join the cause. As a result, in 1965 the Australian Industrial Relations Commission declared that there should be no discrimination in Australian industrial relations law. However, after this pastoralists began to mechanise their operations with fencing and helicopters, as well as starting to employ white Australians. By 1971, Indigenous labour had reduced by 30 percent in some places. Unemployment rose massively during the rest of the decade, with Indigenous people being pushed off pastoral properties and gathering in northern towns such as Katherine, Tennant Creek, Halls Creek, Fitzroy Crossing, Broome and Derby.

Indigenous people generally had very poor economic opportunities, with 81 percent of workers being unskilled, 18 percent semi-skilled, and just 1 percent skilled in New South Wales in the mid-'60s. Health differences to the general population were massive, with many times worse infant mortality rates and child health, especially in the Northern Territory. Issues of malnutrition, poverty and poor sanitation led to health effects on children potentially affecting school success. The lack of skills in New South Wales was accompanied with only 4 percent having finished secondary or apprentice training. Heavy drinking was also widespread.

Notable Indigenous individuals during the post-war era included activist Douglas Nicholls, artist Albert Namatjira, opera singer Harold Blair, and actor Robert Tudawali. Many Indigenous people were also successful in sports, with 30 national and 5 commonwealth boxing champions by 1980. In 1968, boxer Lionel Rose, the first Aboriginal Australian athlete to win a world championship was proclaimed Australian of the Year and thronged by 250,000 adoring fans on the streets of Melbourne. That same year, artist Albert Namatjira (1902–1959) was honoured with a postage stamp. Namatjira's Hermannsburg School art movement had emerged in the 1940s and 50s to great acclaim, foreshadowing a growing respect and fascination with Aboriginal art in the later 20th century, however his exemption from Northern Territory race laws in the 1950s had only served to highlight ongoing discrimination. In the 1970s Rose became a recording artist and had two hits, following from the success of singer-songwriter Jimmy Little, whose 1963 Gospel song "Royal Telephone" had been the first No.1 hit by an Aboriginal artist. Women's Tennis World No. 1 Evonne Goolagong Cawley won 11 grand slams in the 1970s and was Australian of the Year in 1971.

In 1984, a group of Pintupi people who were living a traditional hunter-gatherer desert-dwelling life were tracked down in the Gibson Desert in Western Australia and brought into a settlement. They were believed to have been the last uncontacted tribe in Australia. However, two years later in 1986 another group, the 7-person Richter family, were located in the Great Victoria Desert in south-western Australia.

=== Activism ===
In the 1950s, new political activism for Indigenous rights emerged with 'advancement leagues', which were biracial coalitions. These included the Aboriginal-Australian Fellowship in Sydney and the Victorian Aborigines Advancement League. Similar leagues existed in Perth and Brisbane. A national federation for them was established in 1958 in the form of the Federal Council for the Advancement of Aborigines and Torres Strait Islanders. Conflict over white and Indigenous power within the organisations led to their decline by the 1970s.

Following the Sharpeville massacre, racial issues became a bigger part of student politics, with an educational assistance program called ABSCHOL established by the National Union of Students. In 1965, Charles Perkins organised the Freedom Ride with University of Sydney students, inspired by the American Freedom Riders. The reaction by locals was often violent.

=== Parliamentary representation and equality before the law ===
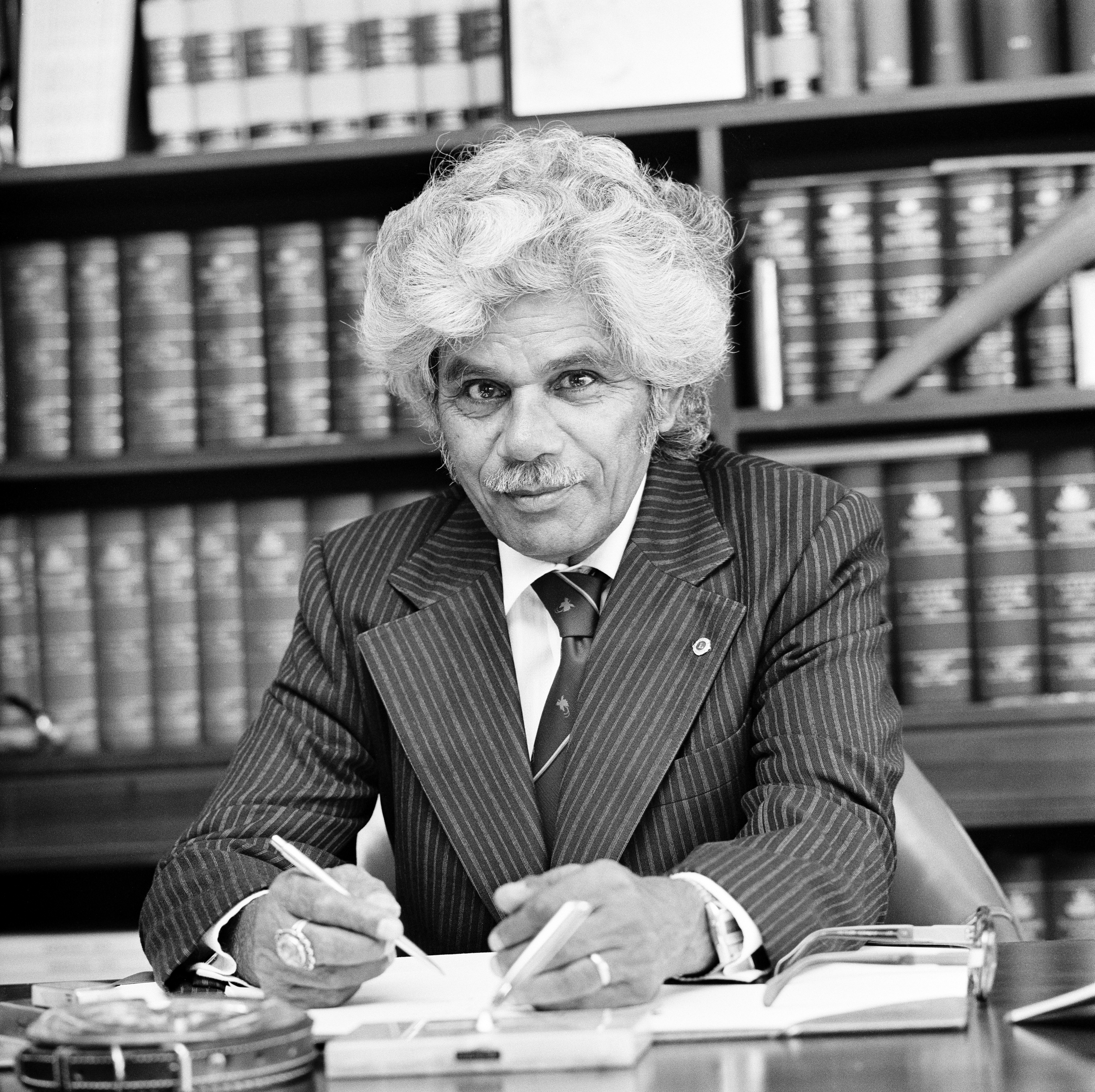
Liberal Senator Neville Bonner, the first federal parliamentarian to identify as Aboriginal, joined the Senate in 1971

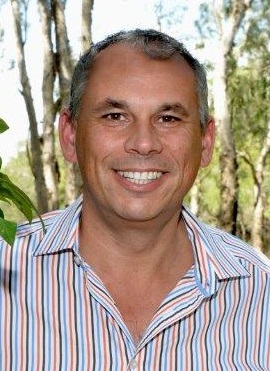
Country Liberal Adam Giles became the first Indigenous Australian to head a state or territory government when he became Chief Minister of the Northern Territory in 2016.

In 1961, at the Native Welfare Conference, a meeting of federal and state ministers responsible for Aboriginal welfare, agreed on a policy of assimilation. The measures included the removal of discriminatory legislation and restrictive practices, welfare measures, education and training to assist the involvement of Aboriginal people in the economy, and the education of non-Indigenous Australians about Aboriginal culture and history.

The Menzies Government's 1962 Commonwealth Electoral Act confirmed the right to vote in Commonwealth elections in Australia. Previously, the law had allowed state governments to determine federal voting rights, and thus Aboriginal people in QLD and WA were still being deprived of the right to vote. The first federal election in which all Aboriginal Australians could vote was held in November 1963. The right to vote in state elections was granted in Western Australia in 1962 and Queensland was the last state to do so in 1965.

Aboriginal people had served in Australian parliaments since colonial times without publicly identifying as such, but from the 1970s, a new generation of Aboriginal representation in Parliament began to assert its presence. Neville Bonner was appointed Liberal Senator for QLD in 1971, becoming the first federal Parliamentarian to identify as Aboriginal. Eric Deeral (QLD) and Hyacinth Tungutalum (NT) followed at a state and territory level in 1974. In 1976, Sir Doug Nicholls was appointed Governor of South Australia, the first indigenous Australian to hold vice-regal office. From these beginnings, by the 2020s, Aboriginal representation in the Federal Parliament had exceeded the proportion of Aboriginal people in the general population, and Australia had its first Aboriginal leader of a state or territory in 2016, when the Country Liberal Party's Adam Giles became Chief Minister of the Northern Territory.

The Holt Government's landmark 1967 Referendum received overwhelming public support for the transfer of responsibility for Aboriginal Affairs to the Federal Government, and the removal of discriminatory provisions regarding the national census from the Australian Constitution. The vote passed with a 90% majority, the largest affirmative vote in the history of Australia's referendums. Following the transfer to federal responsibility, the Office of Aboriginal Affairs was established by the Holt government in 1967. In 1972, the OAA was transformed into a separate government department by the Whitlam government, replacing the preceding Department of the Environment, Aborigines and the Arts created by the McMahon government.

=== Land rights ===
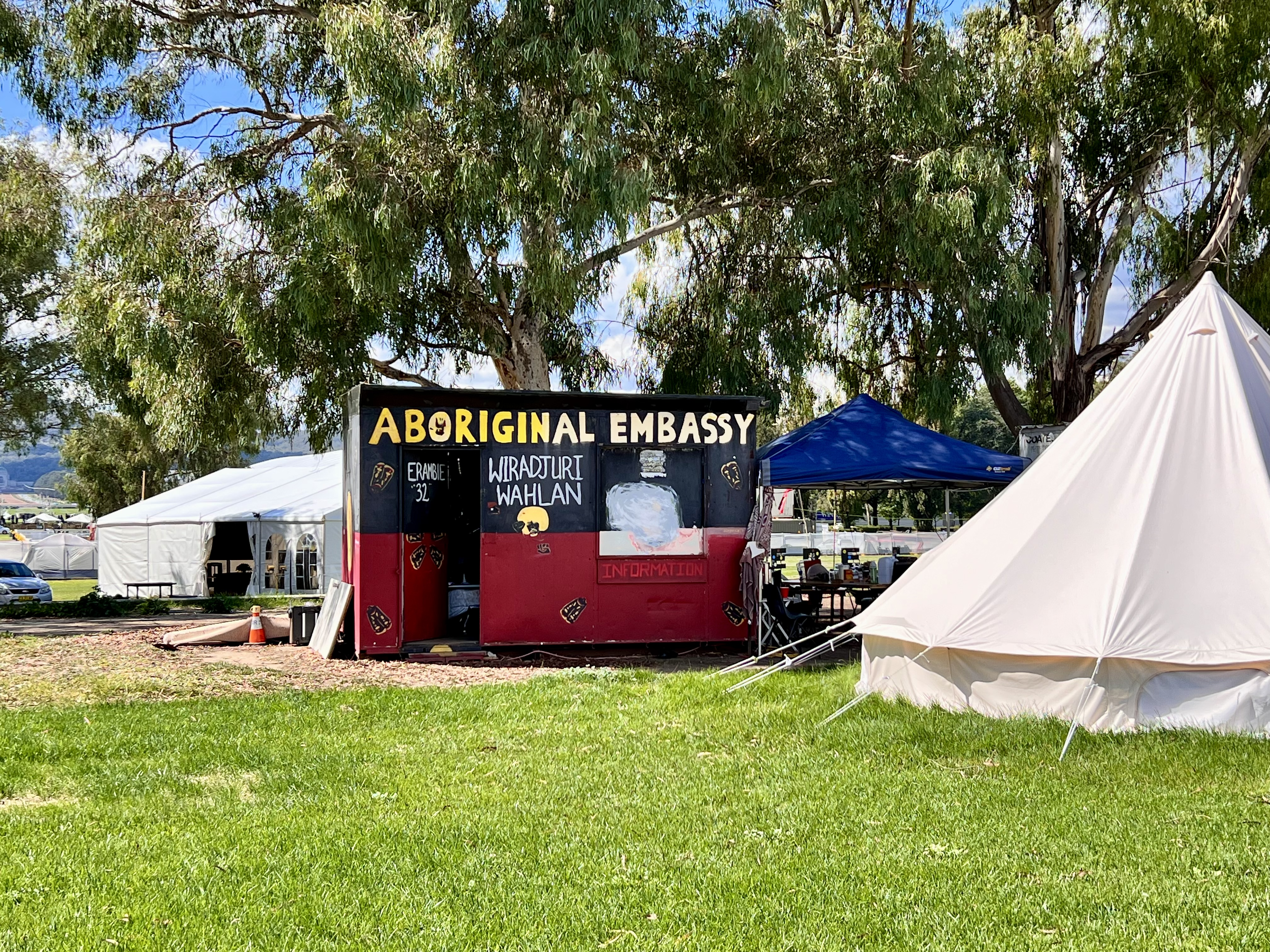
Aboriginal Tent Embassy in Canberra, the longest continuous protest for indigenous land rights in the world

The modern land rights movement started with the 1963 Yolngu Bark Petition, when Yolngu people from the remote settlement of Yirrkala, in north-east Arnhem Land, petitioned the federal government to have their land and rights given back. The 1966 Wave Hill Walk-Off, or Gurundji Strike, started with a protest about working conditions, but grew into a lands right issue, with the people claiming rights to the land which was then a cattle station owned by a large British company, Vesteys. The strike lasted for eight years.

The Aboriginal Lands Trust Act 1966 (SA) established the South Australian Aboriginal Lands Trust (ALT). This was the first major recognition of Aboriginal land rights by any Australian government. It allowed for parcels of Aboriginal land previously held by the SA Government, to be handed to the Aboriginal Lands Trust of SA under the Act. The Trust was governed by a Board composed solely of Aboriginal people.

In 1971, Justice Richard Blackburn of the Supreme Court of the Northern Territory ruled against the Yolngu in Milirrpum v Nabalco Pty Ltd (the "Gove land rights case") under the principle of terra nullius, when they sought native title rights over the Gove Peninsula. However, Justice Blackburn did acknowledge the claimants' ritual and economic use of the land and that they had an established "subtle and highly elaborate" system of laws (Madayin). In this way, this was the first significant legal case for Aboriginal land rights in Australia.

In the wake of Milirrpum, the Aboriginal Land Rights Commission (also known as the "Woodward Royal Commission") was established in the Northern Territory in 1973. This royal commission, chaired by Justice Woodward, made a number of recommendations in favour of recognising Aboriginal Land Rights. Taking up many of these recommendations, the Whitlam government introduced an Aboriginal Land Rights Bill to Parliament; however, this lapsed upon the dismissal of the government in 1975. The succeeding conservative government, led by Malcolm Fraser, reintroduced a Bill, though not of the same content, and it was signed by the Governor-General of Australia on 16 December 1976.

The Aboriginal Land Rights Act 1976 established the basis upon which Aboriginal people in the Northern Territory could claim rights to land based on traditional occupation. The statute, the first of the Aboriginal land rights acts, was significant in that it allowed a claim of title if claimants could provide evidence of their traditional association with land. Four Land Councils were established in the Northern Territory under this law.

The Land Rights Act only applied to the Northern Territory, but Aboriginal communities could also acquire land through various state land rights acts or other legislation. By the early 1980s Aboriginal communities had gained title to about 30 per cent of Northern Territory land and 20 per cent of South Australian land. In 1982, the Queensland government granted Aboriginal reserve land to its occupiers but the grants gave limited rights and was revocable at any time. Only a small proportion of land in other states had been transferred to traditional owners. In 1985, the Hawke government handed over Uluru (Ayers Rock) to traditional owners with a lease back to the Commonwealth. In 1987, the West Australian government granted Aboriginal reserve land (amounting to 7 per cent of the state's land) to traditional owners on 50 year and 99 year leases. Key issues for Indigenous communities with recognised land rights included security of title, the protection of culturally significant sites, and the right to veto, or to be adequately compensated for, mining and development on their land. Compensation for previous dispossession of land was an unresolved issue.

In 1992, the High Court of Australia handed down its decision in the Mabo Case, holding that Indigenous native title survived reception of English law and continued to exist unless extinguished by conflicting law or interests in land. The Keating government passed a Native Title Act in 1993 to regulate native title claims and established a Native Title Tribunal to hear those claims. In the subsequent Wik decision of 1996, the High Court found that a pastoral lease did not necessarily extinguish native title. In response, the Howard government amended the Native Title Act to provide better protection for pastoralists and others with an interest in land. By March 2019 the Native Titles Tribunal had determined that 375 Indigenous communities had established native title over 39 per cent of the Australian continent, with one third under exclusive title.

=== Self-determination ===
The Australian Aboriginal flag was designed in 1971 by Harold Thomas, an Aboriginal artist who is descended from the Luritja people of Central Australia. In 1972, the Aboriginal Tent Embassy was established on the steps of Old Parliament House in Canberra, the Australian capital, to demand sovereignty for the Aboriginal Australian peoples. Demands of the Tent Embassy have included land rights and mineral rights to Aboriginal lands, legal and political control of the Northern Territory, and compensation for land stolen.

The National Aboriginal Consultative Committee (NACC) was the first elected body representing Indigenous Australians on the national level, having been established by the Whitlam government in 1972. It was composed of 36 representatives elected by Aboriginal people in 36 regions of Australia. In 1983, the elections reached a turnout of approximately 78 percent. Following a review in 1976, the NACC was abolished by the new Fraser government in 1977. To replace it, the National Aboriginal Conference (NAC) was founded.

Following the election of the Hawke government in 1983, two reports were commissioned into a replacement of the NAC. The O'Donoghue report argued that the NAC did not effectively represent its constituents or advocate specific policies. The Coombs report made the case for an organisation with representation of regions and existing indigenous organisations. To respond to these recommendations, the Aboriginal and Torres Strait Islander Commission was founded in 1989.

The Outstation movement emerged in the 1970s and continued through the 1980s which saw the creation of very small, remote settlements of Aboriginal people who relocated themselves from the towns and settlements where they had been settled by the government's policy of assimilation. It was "a move towards reclaiming autonomy and self-sufficiency". Outstations were created by Aboriginal people who sought autonomy and could be seen as a sign of remote Aboriginal Australians' attempt at self-determination.

=== 1990 to present ===
In 1992, the Australian High Court handed down its decision in the Mabo Case, declaring the previous legal concept of terra nullius to be invalid and recognising the pre-colonial land interests of First Nations people within Australia's common law. The Prime Minister Paul Keating praised the decision, saying it "establishes a fundamental truth, and lays the basis for justice". Native title doctrine was eventually codified in statute by the Keating government in the Native Title Act 1993. This recognition enabled further litigation for Indigenous land rights in Australia. By 2021, Indigenous Australians had exclusive or shared title to about 54% of the Australian land mass.

In 1998, as the result of the 1997 Bringing Them Home report on the forced removal of Indigenous children from their families, a National Sorry Day was instituted, to acknowledge the wrong that had been done to Indigenous families. Many politicians, from both sides of the house, participated, with the notable exception of the Prime Minister, John Howard, stating that he "did not subscribe to the black armband view of history". In 2008, Prime Minister Kevin Rudd made a formal apology for the Stolen Generations.

In 1999 a referendum was held to change the Australian Constitution to include a preamble that, amongst other topics, recognised the occupation of Australia by Indigenous Australians prior to British settlement. This referendum was defeated, though the recognition of Indigenous Australians in the preamble was not a major issue in the referendum discussion, and the preamble question attracted minor attention compared to the question of becoming a republic.

In 2004, the Australian Government abolished The Aboriginal and Torres Strait Islander Commission (ATSIC), which had been Australia's top Indigenous organisation. The Commonwealth cited corruption and, in particular, made allegations concerning the misuse of public funds by ATSIC's chairman, Geoff Clark, as the principal reason. Indigenous specific programmes have been mainstreamed, that is, reintegrated and transferred to departments and agencies serving the general population. The Office of Indigenous Policy Coordination was established within the then Department of Immigration and Multicultural and Indigenous Affairs, and now with the Department of Families, Community Services and Indigenous Affairs to co-ordinate a "whole of government" effort. Funding was withdrawn from remote homelands (outstations).

From 1971 to 2006, Indigenous employment, median incomes, home ownership, education and life expectancy all improved, although they remained well below the level for those who were not indigenous. In 2008, the Council of Australian Governments created targets for "closing the gap" in inequality in a number of key areas of education, employment, literacy and child mortality. By 2020, the outcomes for Indigenous Australians improved in most of these areas. However, the gap widened for child mortality and school attendance, and targets for closing the inequality gap were not met for employment and child literacy and numeracy. Targets for closing the gap in early childhood education and Year 12 school attainment were on track.

In 2020, all Australian governments committed to a new "National Agreement on Closing the Gap" between Indigenous and non-Indigenous Australians in their life outcomes. However, by 2023 Indigenous people still experienced entrenched inequality.

In October 2023, the Australian population voted "no" to alter the Australian Constitution that would recognise Indigenous Australians in the document through prescribing a body called the Aboriginal and Torres Strait Islander Voice that "may make representations to the Parliament and the Executive Government of the Commonwealth on matters relating to Aboriginal and Torres Strait Islander peoples".

== See also ==
- Aboriginal Australian identity
- Aboriginal History (journal)
- Aboriginal history of Western Australia
- Aboriginal reserve
- Aboriginal land rights in Australia
- Aboriginal South Australians
- Aboriginal Tasmanians
- Aboriginal Victorians
- Australian archaeology
- Australian genocide debate
- Bringing them home report (1997)
- Dark Emu: Black Seeds: Agriculture or Accident? (2014 book)
- Farmers or Hunter-Gatherers? The Dark Emu Debate (2021 book)
- Genocide of Indigenous Australians
- Genocide of indigenous peoples#Australia
- History of Indigenous Australian self-determination
- History wars
- List of Aboriginal missions in New South Wales
- List of Indigenous Australian firsts
- List of massacres of Indigenous Australians
- Native title in Australia
- Stolen Generations
- Tasmania#Removal of Aborigines

== Sources ==
- Blainey, Geoffrey (2020). Captain Cook's Epic Voyage: the Strange Quest for a Missing Continent. Melbourne and Sydney: Viking. ISBN 978-1-76089-509-9.
- Flood, Josephine (2019). The Original Australians: The Story of the Aboriginal People (2nd ed.). Crows Nest, NSW: Allen & Unwin. ISBN 978-1-76052-707-5.
- Macintyre, Stuart (2020). A Concise History of Australia (5th ed.). Port Melbourne: Cambridge University Press. ISBN 978-1-108-72848-5.
- Veth, Peter; O'Connor, Sue (2013). "The past 50,000 years: an archaeological view". In Bashford, Alison; MacIntyre, Stuart (eds.). The Cambridge History of Australia, Volume 1, Indigenous and Colonial Australia. Cambridge: Cambridge University Press. ISBN 978-1-107-01153-3.
