= Wangal =

Ethnic group of indigenous Australians

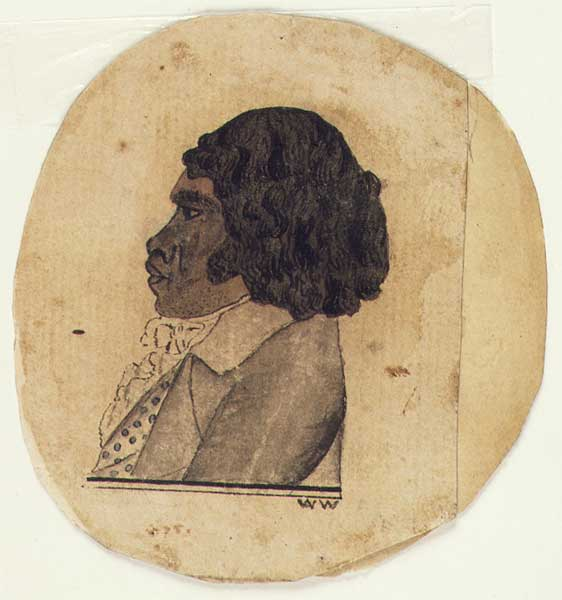
Wangal tribesman, warrior, and diplomat, Bennelong, first captured in November 1789 at the behest of New South Wales Governor Arthur Phillip

The Wangal people (/ˈwɒŋɡəl/; also known as Wanngal or Won-gal) are a clan of the Dharug Aboriginal people whose heirs are custodians of the lands and waters of what is now the Inner West of Sydney, New South Wales, centred around the Municipality of Strathfield, Municipality of Burwood, City of Canada Bay and former Ashfield Council (now part of Inner West Council) and extending west into the City of Parramatta.

== History ==
Archaeological evidence of human occupation alongside the Parramatta River has been dated back 20,000 years, and is likely to date back much further (people have been dated as being present elsewhere in Australia more than 60,000 years ago – see Australian Aboriginal Prehistoric Sites).

Sydney's geomorphology 20,000 years ago was very different from what it is today. In the middle of the last ice age, the Sydney coast was approximately 15 km to the east and what is now Port Jackson (Sydney Harbour) was freshwater creeks and rivers. Wangal predecessors would have been living in the now-submerged coastal area.

As sea levels rose to their present levels, peoples living on the coast would have been forced inland. By 1788, the Wangal people were well established there as a fishing people.

The Wangal people were among the first to encounter British settlers in 1788. While the British governor Arthur Phillip sought to establish good relationships with the local people and even befriended Bennelong, a prominent Wangal person, the differences between the groups led to tensions with both sides killing and injuring members of the other.

In April 1789, just over a year after the establishment of the British settlement, smallpox broke out. There is speculation as to whether the disease was released deliberately or not but in any case the result was catastrophic.

== Country ==
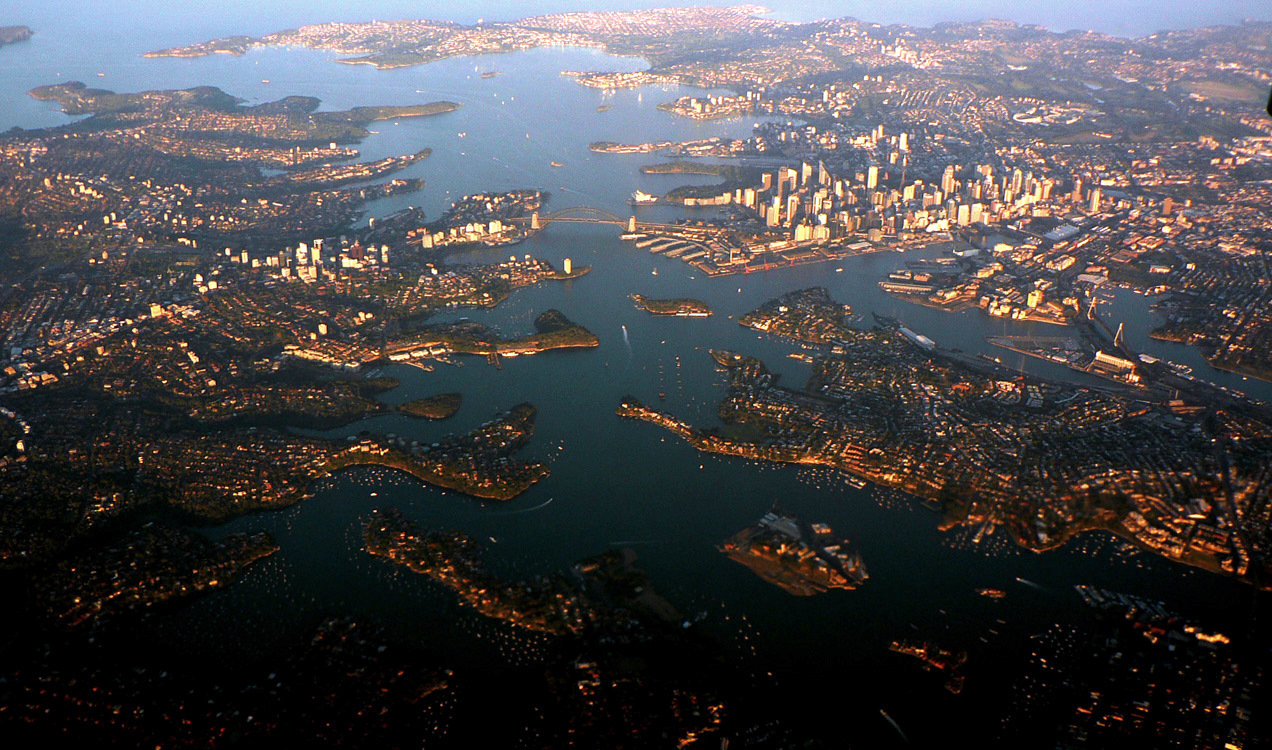
Wangal people's country, Wanne, extends along the south side of Sydney Harbour, from Iron Cove to Rose Hill

The name these people gave to their country was documented by NSW Governor Arthur Phillip in 1790 as Wann and by his successor John Hunter as Wanne. Their country has been described as extending:

...along the south side of the harbour from Long Cove (Iron Cove) to Rose Hill, which the local inhabitants called Parramatta.

Wangal country is mostly located in the area known today as the "Inner West" of Sydney, centred around the council areas of the Municipality of Strathfield, Municipality of Burwood, City of Canada Bay and former Ashfield Council (now part of Inner West Council). In the east, Wangal country extends further into the former Leichhardt Council, where it meets Cadigal land. In the west, Wangal country extends further to the western shore of Homebush Bay, including Sydney Olympic Park in the City of Parramatta. Here, Wangal country meets Burramattagal country.

== Language ==
The Wangal people are part of the Darug (a.k.a. Dharuk) language speaking group of the Dharug nation, who contributed to contemporary Australian English words like dingo, woomera, wallaby, wombat, and waratah.

The Wangal people and their Dharug neighbours, the Cadigal people, were heavily impacted by early British settlement, many dying from smallpox or being pushed from their lands by the early settlers, and ceasing to be acknowledged and known as a viable, functioning social group within twenty years or so of 1788.

The Dharug language has since been reconstructed from the many notes made of it by the original colonists, although there has been no known oral language tradition continuing over the last one hundred years.

== See also ==
- Darug
- Strathfield, New South Wales § History
- Leichhardt, New South Wales § Aboriginal anthropology
- Five Dock, New South Wales § Indigenous heritage

== Sources ==
- "Aboriginal History". Strathfield Council. Archived from the original on 7 February 2012.
- "Aboriginal History of the Inner West". Inner West Council.
- "Aboriginal People of Coastal Sydney". Australian Museum. 2002. Archived from the original on 27 September 2005.
- "Cadigal Wangal: Bush Tucker". Marrickville Council. Archived from the original on 26 June 2007.
- "Cadigal Wangal: Smallpox Epidemic". Marrickville Council. Archived from the original on 2 September 2007.
- "Cadigal Wangal: The Ice Age". Marrickville Council. Archived from the original on 30 August 2007.
- "History and Heritage". Burwood Council.
- "Reconciliation Statement – Leichhardt". Inner West Council.
- "Sydney Olympic Park – Indigenous History". Sydney Olympic Park.
- Thieberger, N.; McGregor, W. (1994). "Sydney language". Macquarie Aboriginal words: Maquarie Aboriginal words: a dictionary of words from Australian Aboriginal and Torres Strait Islander languages. Sydney: Macquarie Library. ISBN 978-094975779-1 – via Internet Archive.
- Turbet, Peter (1989). The Aborigines of the Sydney District Before 1788. Kenthurst: Kangaroo Press. ISBN 978-086417222-8.
- "Wangal People: Fact Sheet" (PDF). City of Canada Bay Council.
