= Australian Aboriginal prehistoric sites =

This is a list of Australian Aboriginal prehistoric sites.

Key:

- BGS = Below ground surface
- C14 = Radiocarbon date
- char. = charcoal
- OSL = Optical stimulated thermoluminescence
- AA = Australian Archaeology

| Locality | Reference | Lab no. | Age yrs BP | Type of date | Type of site |
New South Wales
| Cuddie Springs | | | | | Open site |
Northern Territory
| Malakunanja II | Roberts et al. Nature 1990 | KTL 162 | 61,000^{+9,000}_{−13,000} | OSL | Lowest artefact at 260 cm BGS |
| Malakunanja II | | KTL 158 | 52,000^{+7,000}_{−11,000} | OSL | Artefacts at 250 cm BGS |
| Malakunanja II | | KTL 164 | 45,000^{+6,000}_{−9,000} | OSL | Artefacts at 230 cm BGS |
| Malakunanja II | | SUA 256 | 18,040±300 | C14 char. | Associated with ochre and grindstone |
| Nawalabila I | Roberts et al. AA 1993 | Ox-od K169 | 60,300±6700 | OSL | Artefacts at 285–302 cm BGS |
| Nawalabila I | | Ox-od K170 | 58,300±5800 | OSL | Base of rubble auger hole |
| Nawalabila I | | Ox-od K168 | 53,400±5400 | OSL | Artefacts at 228–240 cm BGS |
| Nawalabila I | | Ox-od K166 | 30,000±2400 | OSL | Artefacts at 170–175 cm BGS |
| Nawalabila I | | SUA 237 | 19,975±264 | C14 char. | Lowest C14 date |
| Nawalabila I | | Ox-od K172 | 13,500±900 | OSL | Artefacts at 104–110 cm BGS |
| Nawalabila I | | Ox-od K171 | 2,900±600 | OSL | Artefacts at 1–6 cm BGS |
| Malanganger | Roberts et al. Nature 1990 | KTL 126 | 32,000±7,000 | OSL | Lowest artefacts at 200 BGS |
| Malangangerr | C.White 1967, 1971 | ANU 77B; GaK 629; GaK 628 | 22,900±1000; 22,700±700; 19,600±550 | C14 char. | earliest ground edge axes |
| Nawamoyn | C.White 1967,1971 | ANU 51 | 21,450±380 | C14 char. | Ground edge axes |
| Puritjarra | M.A.Smith Nature 1987 | Beta 19901 | 21,950±270 | C14 char. | Artefacts below this estimated to be 30,000 BP |
South Australia
| Warratyi | doi:10.1038/nature20125 | | | | |
Tasmania
| Kutikina "spirit" | | | 15–20,000 | | Rock shelter |
| Nunamira "sleeping place" | | | 30,420±690 | | Rock shelter, 60 cm BGS |
| ORS 7 | | | 30,840±480 | | Rock shelter, 60 cm BGS |
| Bone Cave | | | 13,700-35,000 | | Rock shelter |
Western Australia
| Rottnest Island | Charles Dortch, The West Australian 23 June 2003 | ANU & James Cook Uni | 70,000^{+10,000}_{−20,000} | U/Th C14 | flint tool embedded in Tamala limestone (Aminozone C) |
| Upper Swan Bridge | Pearce and Barbetti AO 1981 | SUA 1500; SUA 1665 | 39,500^{+2,300}_{−1,800} 37,100^{+1,600}_{−1,300} | C14 char. | Campsite Occupation 88–96 cm BGS Occupation 75–80 cm BGS |
| Mandu Mandu Creek RS | Morse AO 1988; Antiquity 1993; Bowdler 1992 | Wk 1513; Wk 1576; SUA 3454 | 34,299±1050; 30,000±850; 25,200±250 | C14 baler shell C14 nodule | Shell necklace Early occupation |
| Devil's Lair | Dortch 1984 | SUA 585/6 | 32,800±830 | C14 char. | Pooled age |
