= Johan Kamminga =

Australian archaeologist

Johan (Jo) Kamminga is an archaeologist based in Canberra, Australia. He has played a prominent role in the formation of the practice of Australian archaeology and in particular the Academic discipline.

He completed his Doctor of Philosophy at the University of Sydney in 1978, but is best known for his work with John Mulvaney in producing the 1999 revision of the Prehistory of Australia. and has been described as ...the longest practicing consultant archaeologist in Australia.

The main field of his research is in ancient technology such as stone flaking techniques, in which he has also contributed to improvements in the understanding of use-wear analysis of stone tools through replicative experiments which has been described as groundbreaking research in the area of use wear and residue analysis of stone tools. For example, he prepared the research design in the 1980s, which was later used in Daniel Davenport's 2003 work on rattan processing by Cagayan Valley Negrito hunter gatherers in the Philippines.

Kamminga contributed to the establishment of the great antiquity of Aboriginal occupation in Australia, when stone tools he had excavated in Kakadu National Park in 1973, were dated nearly a decade later by Rhys Jones to more than 30,000 years old at a time when it was assumed aboriginal people had only been in the continent for a few thousand years. Kamminga is also credited with the discovery of the Malakunanja site and excavations at Nauwalabila where possibly the oldest dates for Aboriginal occupation have been found in Australia.

He directed the archaeological survey of the Alligator River in Arnhem Land in the 1970s in part contributing to the declaration of the area as part of Kakadu National Park, and undertook research projects at La Trobe University Sydney University and the Australian National University in the 1980s. Kamminga has been involved in some contentious areas in the field of archaeology, such as taking up the issue of perceived bias in the appointments of academics to positions in Prehistory departments in Australian Universities, in particular the favouring of Cambridge University graduates. He has also taken up the cause of protection of Aboriginal sites against development.

Kamminga is also consultant to the erotic garden and tea house created by Kattai Kamminga in Chiang Mai, Thailand.

== Publications ==
- Kamminga, J., 1978. Journey into the microcosms. Ph.D. thesis, University of Sydney, Sydney.
- Kamminga, Johan. 1979, 'The nature of use – polish and abrasive smoothing on stone tools'. in Hayden, B.D. Lithic use-wear analysis, New York; Academic Press
- Kamminga, J., 1980. Analysing stone tools: review of experimental determination of stone tool use. Science 210: 58–59. doi:10.1126/science.210.4465.58
- Kamminga, J., 1982. Over the Edge. St Lucia (Qld): Anthropo- logical Museum, University of Queensland. Occasional Papers in Anthropology 12
- Kamminga, J., Brian Cotterell, 1990, Mechanics of pre-industrial technology : an introduction to the mechanics of ancient and traditional material culture – 1st pbk. ed. Cambridge, England; Melbourne : Cambridge University Press
- Mulvaney, John & Johan Kamminga, 1999, Prehistory of Australia, Allen & Unwin, St Leonards, NSW, revised edition
