= Madjedbebe =

Ancient rock shelter in the Northern Territory of Australia

- Madjedbebe
- Malakunanja II
- Location within Northern Territory Location within Australia
- 12°30′S 132°53′E
- Type: Rock shelter site
- Periods: Pleistocene
- Cultures: Aboriginal Australians
- Location: Arnhem Land
- Region: Northern Territory

Site notes
- Excavation dates: 1973, 1989, 2012, 2015
- Archaeologists: Chris Clarkson Johan Kamminga, Rhys Jones, Mike Smith
- Management: Mirrar traditional owners of lands
- Public access: No

Madjedbebe (formerly known as Malakunanja II) is a sandstone rock shelter in Arnhem Land, in the Northern Territory of Australia, possibly the oldest site of human habitation in Australia. It is located about 50 kilometres (31 mi) from the coast. It is part of the lands traditionally inhabited by the Mirarr, an Aboriginal Australian clan of the Gaagudju people, of the Gunwinyguan language group.

Madjedbebe is located within the former Jabiluka Mineral Leasehold, surrounded by the World Heritage-listed Kakadu National Park. The mineral lease expired in August 2024, after the Australian federal government refused a renewal application from the mine's operators. The government plans to formally absorb the site into Kakadu National Park.

== Archaeological findings ==
Madjedbebe is the oldest known site showing the presence of humans in Australia. Archaeological excavations conducted by Clarkson et al. (2017) yielded evidence to suggest that Madjedbebe was first occupied by humans possibly by 65,000 ± 6,000 years ago and at least by 50,000 years ago. While the age of 50,000 years ago has been widely accepted since the 1990s, this latter estimate (of ca. 65,000 years ago) has, as of 2017, been questioned by some experts.

More than 100,000 artefacts have been excavated (including >10,000 artefacts from the lowest dense occupation layer termed 'Phase 2'), including flaked stone artefacts, ground stone axe heads, grinding stones, animal bones, shellfish remains, ground ochre, charcoal, seeds and human burials. Some of these were buried more than 2.5 metres below the surface. Archaeobotanical investigations have demonstrated the exploitation of plant foods, including seeds, tubers and pandanus nuts. Fuel wood was also sourced from local eucalyptus and monsoon vine thicket forests.

== History of archaeological research ==
The Madjedbebe site was first documented by researchers in the 1970s as part of the Alligator Rivers Environmental Fact Finding Study (of course, Mirarr people had always known about the existence of the site). In 1973 archaeologist Johan Kamminga carried out a small-scale test pit excavation to a depth of nearly 2.5 m below surface, which provided the first evidence that the site contained a Pleistocene-aged occupation history. The uppermost 60 cm of the site was rich shell midden, with abundant shells, faunal remains, stone artefacts and human remains. Below this the site was very sandy and contained mostly stone artefacts.

In 1988 the site was re-visited by archaeologists Rhys Jones and Christopher Chippindale, along with geochronologist Richard 'Bert' Roberts. At this time they augered a single core at the site in order to trial the then new technique of thermoluminescence dating at the site. The following year, Jones and Roberts returned to the site with archaeologist Mike Smith and excavated another test-pit adjacent to that of Kamminga. The thermoluminescence age estimates they obtained suggested the site was about 50,000 years old. These ages were queried at the time (and later) on various grounds by numerous researchers, but Roberts et al. responded to the queries re-affirming their confidence in the dates.

In 2012 and 2015 a team of researchers, led by Christopher Clarkson and working in partnership with Gundjeihmi Aboriginal Corporation, re-excavated the site to try and dispel the questions about the antiquity of the site. Recent results published by Clarkson and his team have led to a series of responses, again with some questioning the integrity of the site stratigraphy and validity of the ages of human occupation, however Clarkson's team has stood by the dates.

In 2020, a study came out suggesting that the 65,000 year date may be the result of disturbance of the site by termites.

== Rock art ==
Although it is best known as Australia's oldest archaeological site, Madjedbebe also includes an extensive assemblage of rock art motifs on the walls. In 2012 a research team from the Australian National University systematically documented the rock art at the site, under the auspices of the Mirarr Gunwarddebim Project. The team recorded more than 1000 motifs at the site. As many of the images are faded, and many overlap, this is the minimum number of motifs the site that can be seen today; presumably in the past there were many more present that no longer survive.

The Madjedbebe motifs are mostly paintings (created using wet paint), but there are also some stencils (where a negative image is created by spraying wet paint around the outside of an object held up against the wall), drawings (created by dragging a piece of dry ochre or charcoal across the wall) and beeswax figures (created by applying small, rolled up pieces of beeswax to the wall surface). A variety of different coloured pigments have been used to create the art at Madjedbebe. These are mostly ochres (red, yellow and orange), but many are also white clay (kaolinite) and some black charcoal.

The Madjedbebe motifs include many human-like figures ('anthropomorphs'), geometric designs, hand stencils, fish (including catfish, barramundi, freshwater long-tom, mullet and saratoga), fibre objects, and objects from the 'European-contact period'. The latter include firearms, European people (wearing clothing, hats and standing in a characteristic 'hands on hip' manner), pipes, knives and ships.

There are no absolute ages for any of the rock art motifs at Madjedbebe. Instead, the art has been dated using relative techniques. This suggests that the majority of the art presented today was created in the last 1500 years, though some motifs may be several thousand years old. It is highly likely that the tradition of painting in the site is far older than this, with older paintings having faded away or been painted over.

Of relevance here are the fragments of ochre recovered from the lowest occupation levels during the 2012 and 2015 excavations at Madjedbebe, some of which have ground facets. These are a tantalising suggestion that even at this early time people were engaging in some form of artistic pursuit, whether that was painting motifs on the walls of the shelter, or decorating objects or themselves with the ground ochre.
