= Bomaderry Aboriginal Children's Home =

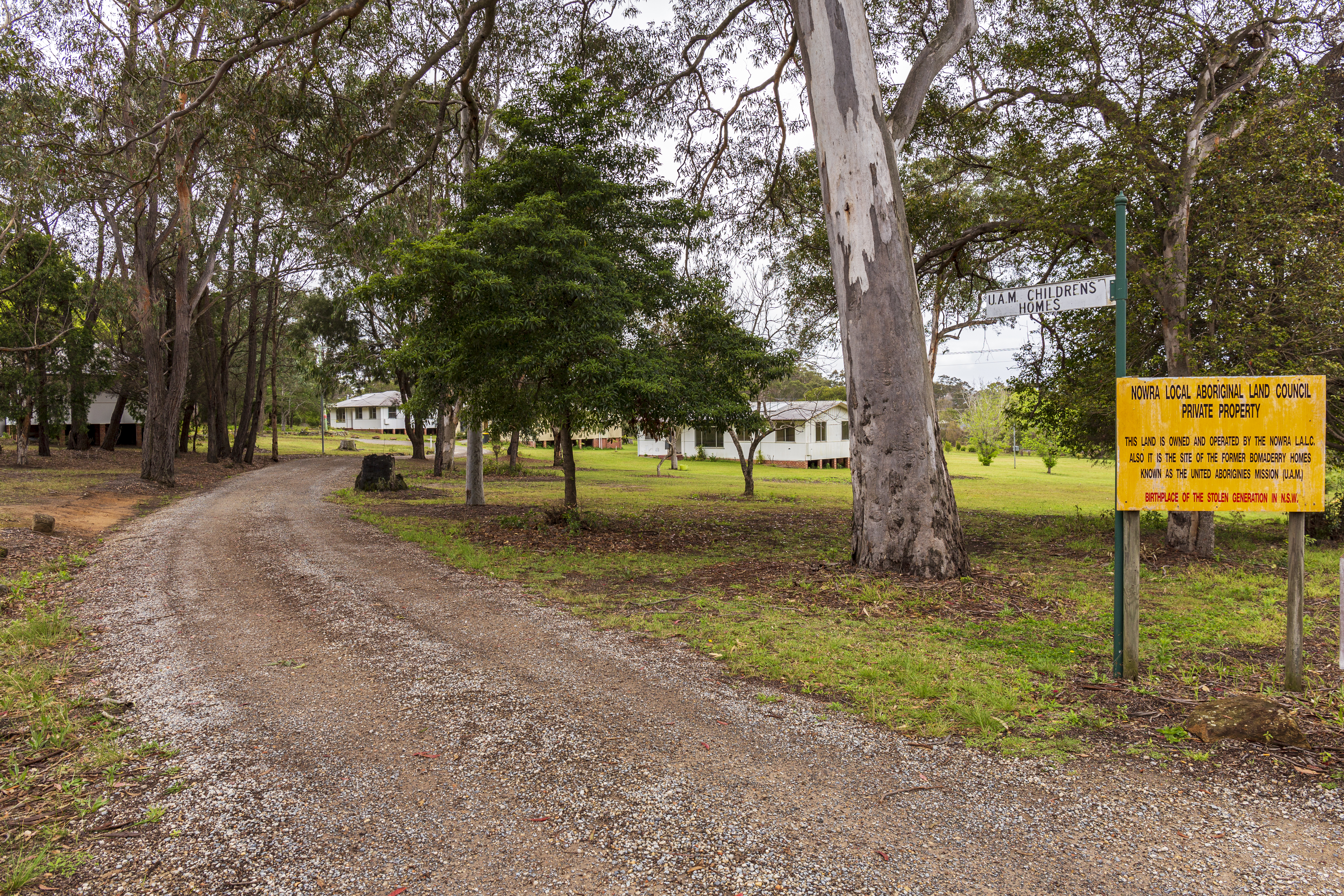

- Location within New South Wales Location within Australia
- 34.8554°S 150.6008°E
- Location: 59 Beinda Street, Bomaderry, City of Shoalhaven, New South Wales, Australia

History
- Built: 1908–1988

Site notes
- Architect: United Aborigines Mission
- Owner: Nowra Local Aboriginal Land Council

New South Wales Heritage Register
- Official name: Bomaderry Aboriginal Children's Home; Bomaderry Children's Home (Former); Bomaderry Babies Home; United Aborigines Mission Home
- Type: state heritage (built)
- Designated: 17 February 2012
- Reference no.: 1874
- Type: Historic site
- Category: Aboriginal

Bomaderry Aboriginal Children's Home is a heritage-listed former Institutional home for Aboriginal children and now Nowra Local Aboriginal Land Council offices at 59 Beinda Street, Bomaderry, in the South Coast region of New South Wales, Australia. It was designed by United Aborigines Mission and built from 1908. It was also known as Bomaderry Children's Home; Bomaderry Babies Home; and United Aborigines Mission Home. The property is owned by Nowra Local Aboriginal Land Council. It was added to the New South Wales State Heritage Register on 17 February 2012.

== History ==
=== Background ===
Historically Aboriginal children were separated from their families from the earliest days of the colony. Governor Macquarie established the first Native Institution in Parramatta as early as 1814 and in 1823 another Native Institution was started in Blacktown. Both these institutions were considered failures, one reason being that once parents realised their children wouldn't be allowed to come home, they wouldn't give them up to the institutions. The Government of New South Wales also subsidised missionary activity among the Aboriginal people, including that of the London Missionary Society in the 1820s and 1830s. On the frontier of Wellington Valley the Reverend Watson gained a reputation for stealing Aboriginal children and as a consequence the Wiradjuri hid their children from the white men.

With the spread of settlers and their livestock came conflict and dispossession. The first bill for the Protection of Aborigines was drafted in 1838 after the Myall Creek massacre. Thus began a systemic government approach to the regulation and control of the lives of Aboriginal people that got tighter and tighter until the 1967 referendum finally brought significant change.

Until 1881 Aboriginal people were under the jurisdiction of the Colonial Secretary, Police and the Lands Department. In 1880, a private body known as the New South Wales Aborigines Protection Association was formed, and following agitation by this body, the Government appointed a Protector of Aborigines, Mr. George Thornton MLC (State Records). The Board for the Protection of Aborigines was subsequently created in 1883. "The objectives of the Board were to provide asylum for the aged and sick, who are dependent on others for help and support; but also, and of at least equal importance to train and teach the young, to fit them to take their places amongst the rest of the community." This objective became the basis of future child removal policy: that the supposed inferiority of the Aboriginal people would only be dealt with by removing the children and educating them in white ways.

In Darlington Point Reverend Gribble established Warangesda Aboriginal Mission in 1880 and established a separate girls' dormitory. The dormitory followed the institutional model of its time, and taught housekeeping skills to the girls to prepare them for respectable employment in menial duties on nearby stations. It also housed them separately in a building which included a dining room and kitchen as well as the dormitory room. Girls were brought in from many places and kept under supervision of dormitory matrons as well as Mrs. Gribble or the wives of later managers. This became a model for the later Government run Aboriginal Children's Training Homes, the Cootamundra Domestic Training Home for Aboriginal Girls at Cootamundra and the Kinchela Aboriginal Boys' Training Home at Kinchela.

Frustrated by the lack of legislative power to control the education and lives of Aboriginal children the Aboriginal Protection Board successfully lobbied for a new act which was introduced in 1909 (Aborigines Protection Act 1909). The Board's Annual Reports of 1909 and 1911, show the emphasis on training of Aboriginal children. The Board felt limited by the Act because it only gave them direct control over children over 14 who could be apprenticed. To remove younger children they had to apply to the magistrate under the Neglected Children and Juvenile Offenders Act 1905. The Board was of the opinion that the children would only become good and proper members of "industrial society" if they were completely removed and not allowed to return. The underlying assumption was that Aboriginal people lacked the intellect to undertake anything but menial tasks. This later translated into the limits on the types of training provided; girls training for domestic service and the boys for labouring.

The Aborigines Protection Act was amended in 1915 and again in 1918 giving the Board the right "to assume full control and custody of the child of any aborigine, if after due inquiry it is satisfied that such a course is in the interest of the moral or physical welfare of such child. The Board may remove such child to such control and care as it thinks best." (Aborigines Protection Amending Act, 1915, 4. 13A.) A court hearing was no longer necessary. If the parents wanted to appeal it was up to them to go to the court.

The depression and drought years of the 1920s and 1930s were particularly difficult for Aboriginal people. Conditions in the reserves remaining from the soldier settlement land redistribution, were poor, often overcrowded, and it was easy for the government to prove neglect and remove Aboriginal children. In 1937, in response to public pressure from academic and missionary groups sympathetic to Aboriginal people, a meeting was convened of State and Commonwealth Aboriginal authorities. The result was an official assimilation policy formed on the premise that "full-blood" Aborigines would be soon extinct and the "half-caste" should be absorbed into society. Meanwhile, the Aboriginal people were organising to become a force of resistance. The Sesquicentenary was marked by a National Day of Mourning and a call for the abolition of the Protection Board.

The Aborigines Protection Board was finally abolished and replaced by the Aborigines Welfare Board in 1940. Aboriginal children were then subject to the Child Welfare Act 1939 which required a magistrate's hearing and the child had to be proven neglected or uncontrollable. Aboriginal children continued to be sent to Cootamundra, Bomaderry and Kinchela, some went to Mittagong or Boystown. There were no specific homes for uncontrollable Aboriginal children so these were sent to State corrective institutions such as Mt Penang or Parramatta Girls. The education of Aboriginal children had generally been one of segregation until, in 1940, the Department of Education officially took on the role.

In the 1960s the work of British psychiatrist John Bowlby on "attachment theory", began to influence the institutional care of children in Australia. That an infant needs to develop a relationship with at least one primary caregiver for social and emotional development to occur normally: rather than only being treated with affection as a reward (Cupboard Love) which was the prevailing theory of the 1940s. Fostering then became the preferred option and a more common occurrence. In accordance with the assimilation policy which was still prevalent, Aboriginal children were fostered with non-Aboriginal parents. In the case of Bomaderry the property was redesigned.

In May 1967, a referendum changed the Australian constitution bringing positive changes for the Aboriginal people. One resultant change was the abolition of the Aborigines Welfare Board in 1969.

=== Bomaderry Aboriginal Children's Home History ===
In June 1884 the Native Christian Endeavour Society was formed in La Perouse. In 1899 it became known as the New South Wales Aboriginal Mission then in 1907 it became the Australian Aboriginal Mission. Finally the organisation became known as the United Aborigines Mission (UAM), an organisation whose central task was to teach the Gospel to Australian Aboriginal people. UAM established children's homes, schools, hospitals, and community stores around Australia, as well as undertaking transport and language work.

In 1907, a baby girl came into the care of two missionaries and in 1908 an Aboriginal woman died leaving behind 6 orphaned children; together these 7 children became the first residents of the Bomaderry Aboriginal Children's Home established by UAM in 1908. The Home opened in 1908 in a three bedroom cottage on 3 1/4 acres of land next to the Shoalhaven River. It is often referred to as the "first children's home" as it predates the others established under the 1909 Act and was established as a home for orphaned and neglected children. As more children arrived, the cottage was enlarged and another cottage was built on an adjoining block of land. By 1913 there were 17 children from 3 1/2 years to 12 years. A newspaper report of the time stated that "quite a number (of children) have been drafted out to comfortable houses". The cottages were located in bushland and there was a walking track to the river. In 1914 a building was moved from Roseby Park to the Home to become the boys' dormitory. By 1916 there were three cottages and twenty nine children in the home, with ages ranging from two to sixteen years. A third parcel of land was donated to the home by Mark Morton. Likewise furniture, clothing and food came from donations from the community.

Under the 1909 Aborigines Protection Act children were removed from their families if they were found to be neglected. The Act was originally intended to enable the training of Aboriginal children and was therefore aimed at older children. The Act was amended in 1915 to allow younger children to be taken and to give the Board more power to act without parental consent. An article in the Sydney Morning Herald in 1921 reported in the words of an official from the Aborigines Protection Board "that the principal work of the Board was the rescuing from the Reserves of all children who had reached the age of 14 years, and the taking of children from parents whose neglect warranted the board's intervention." Children removed by the Board who were old enough for training were taken to the Board's own institutions such as Cootamundra Girl's Training Home or Kinchela Boy's Training Home. If the children were taken very young, or as babies, they were first taken to Bomaderry Children's Home. UAM supported the activities of the Aborigines Protection Board by providing a home for these young Aboriginal children. In 1922 there were 45 children at the home with the two eldest being apprenticed by the mission. On the site were three buildings with a fourth under construction. The number of the children at the home must have fluctuated around the upper 30s as in 1924 there were 36 children. The children at the Bomaderry Aboriginal Children's Home were housed in dormitory cottages up until the 1960s. There was a separate cottage for kitchen and dining and for the sisters' accommodation.

By 1964, the dormitory cottages were in poor condition and had to be removed. On the weekend of 14 July 1964 volunteers commenced building the first of five new cottages to replace the dormitories. Many local businesses donated or subsidised the cost of materials; much of the furniture was donated by a company in Sydney (Hipkin). In direct response to the "attachment theory" of childcare, which was prevalent at the time when new buildings were needed, the design of the new dwellings at the Bomaderry Aboriginal Children's Home became focused on a single "family" unit. Each cottage would have a parent figure or parent couple who would be in charge of a group of up to 9 children, some of whom were siblings. Each cottage had four bedrooms, a bathroom, kitchen, laundry and lounge and were self-sufficient in terms of cooking and cleaning.

Today the Bomaderry Aboriginal Children's Home has enormous significance for the people sent there as children. It is a place associated with deep emotional ties, there are feelings of both hurt and affection for the place. People associated with the Bomaderry Aboriginal Children's Home include Harry Penrith (Burnum Burnum), of Woiworung and Yorta Yorta heritage, who was born at Wallaga Lake on the south coast of New South Wales. He was taken from his family and placed in the United Aboriginals Mission Home at Bomaderry and later transferred to the Kinchela Boys Training Home.

== Description ==
The property is a corner block comprising three lots. It slopes gently towards Brinawarr Street with a frontage of 183 metres to Brinawarr Street and 159 metres to Beinda Street. The existing vehicular access to the site is from Beinda Street however the original entrance was from the other frontage. The original fence is still partially evident along Brinawarr Street. The site has areas of exposed rock and some large trees. Two large gums survive in the centre of the site which can be seen in the earlier photos of the site. Dense vegetation still exists along the northern boundary.

In an open area between the surviving houses and Brinawarr Street the remains of the original cottage dormitories can be seen in pathways and remains of footings. These cottages had termite infestation and were demolished and burnt over a period from 1964 to 1972.

There are five existing houses on the property dating from the 2nd phase of the United Aborigines Mission occupancy period from 1964 to 1988. These are constructed of fibro/ asbestos sheet with aluminium framed windows and corrugated metal roofs. One house is currently used as an office by the Nowra Local Aboriginal Land Council, and an original cottage from the 1st phase (1908 to 1964) that was moved on the site to its present location during the 2nd UAM phase. It has some features including many original windows and doors but has been opened up internally for office use.

Two smaller weatherboard buildings were originally used as wood sheds are located between the houses. There are two large and one smaller colorbond sheds which have been erected since 1996 at the northern end of the site.

=== Condition ===
The dormitory buildings from the 1908–1964 period have been demolished, but the interconnecting paths and some footings are still evident. The area should be treated as an archaeological zone.

The five surviving 1964–1973 "contemporary cottages" were reported to be in good condition as at 25 March 2011. The interior of the matrons cottage appears to be highly intact and includes evidence of the use by children, such as labelling shelves in a wardrobe. The interior of the Land Council house has been modified and the interiors of the other three were not inspected.

The post 1960 buildings are very intact. The pre 1960 buildings have been demolished but their footings can be seen in the grass.

=== Modifications and dates ===
- 1964–1972: Demolition of original dormitory cottages and construction of five new houses.
- 1964: the house "Ebenezer" was constructed.
- 1968: the house "Maranatha" was constructed.
- 1970: the house "Bethel" was constructed and it was occupied by the Matron Kennedy and children.
- 1972: the house "Bethesda" was constructed and it was occupied by a couple and their own son, and three teenage boys.
- 1973: the house "Salem" which was the converted Sisters cottage was occupied by a couple and their daughter and children of the home.
- 1988: the children's home closed.

== Notable residents ==
- Joy Williams (1942–2006), writer and activist

== See also ==
- "Won't Stop" a 2024 single by 3% filmed on site.
