= Isabel Reid =

Aboriginal Australian advocate and community worker

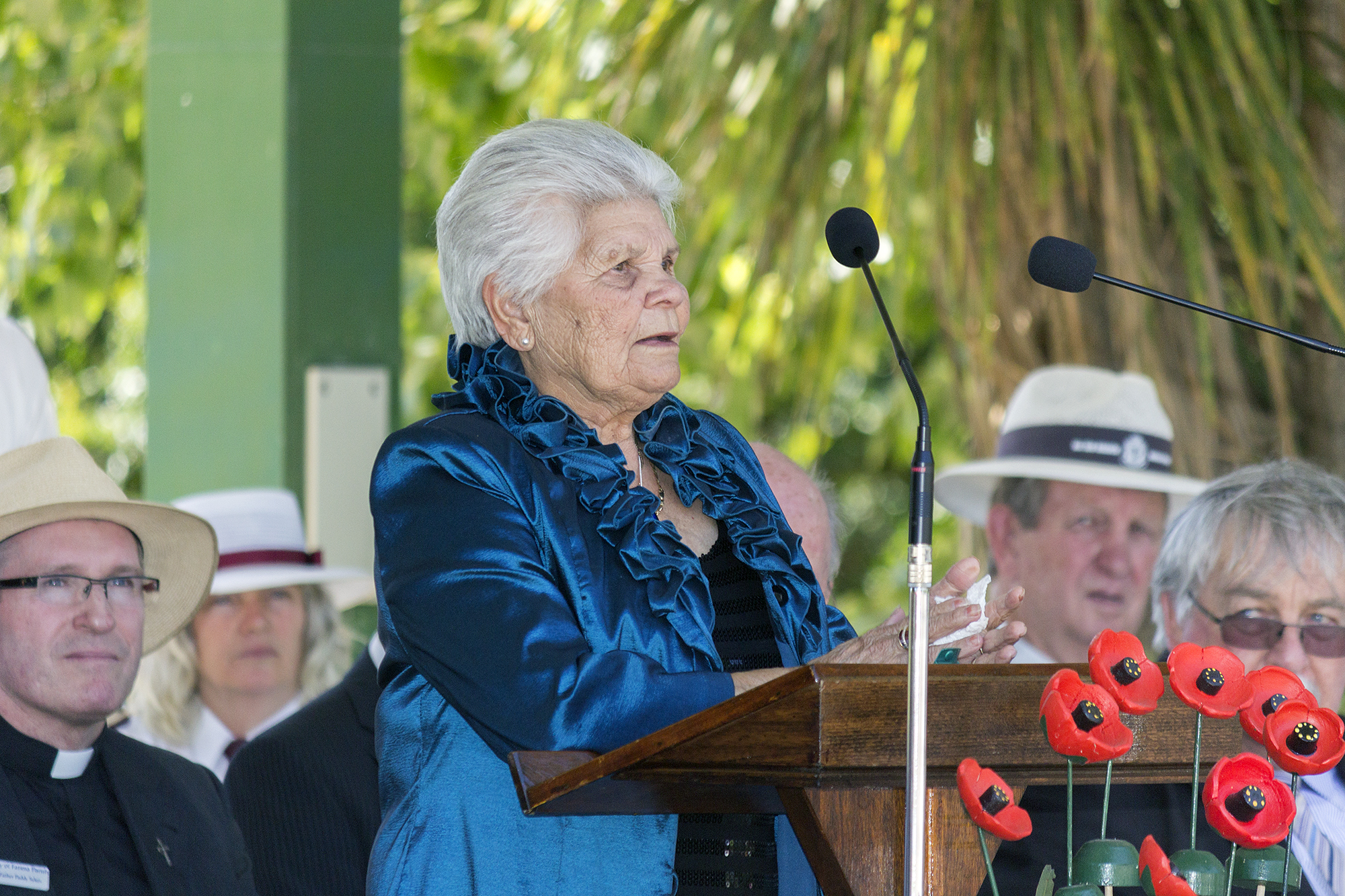
- Aunty Isabel Reid giving the Welcome to Country at the centenary of the Kangaroo March launch, December 2013
- Born: Isabel Hampton; 1932 (age 93–94)
- Occupations: Community worker, educator, Indigenous advocate
- Known for: Advocacy for the Stolen Generations; former resident of the Cootamundra Domestic Training Home for Aboriginal Girls

Isabel Reid (Note: Sometimes misspelt "Isobel".) (née Hampton; born 1932), known in her later years as Aunty Isabel, is an Aboriginal Australian advocate for the Stolen Generations and other issues. She is a former resident of the Cootamundra Domestic Training Home for Aboriginal Girls.

== Early life and education ==
Isabel Reid was born Isabel Hampton in 1932 in Quambone, New South Wales, the daughter of Alfred James Hampton and Florence Margaret Hickey, who was from Brungle Mission. She is of Wiradjuri descent. She was taken along with her brother Jack and sister Betty as they were walking home from school one day, with their parents being told nothing of what had happened. They were taken to the local police station, where they were kept for a couple of days before being put on a train to Sydney. The girls were sent to Cootamundra Domestic Training Home for Aboriginal Girls, and Jack was sent to Kinchela Boys' Home, and she never saw her brother again. Some of her other siblings were Dawn, Margaret Florence, and Sam.

Aged 16, Reid was taken in by a local GP and his wife, and started working with him. She later said, "They built a little unit on the back of their place and I stayed with them until I was 18. I told him everything".

She then went to TAFE to acquire literacy skills.

== Work and advocacy ==
Reid did volunteer work and was employed at the Riverina Juvenile Justice Centre.

Reid worked at Wagga Wagga Public School, a primary school in Wagga Wagga, teaching Indigenous children to read and write. Reading aloud to them improved her skills.

She later became a respected elder of the Wiradjuri people, and advocate for the Stolen Generations and other Indigenous issues. In February 2000, she co-founded the Wagga Wagga Aboriginal Elders Group, later becoming president (2002). Along with Edna Andrew, Penny Everaardt, Joyce Hampton, and Sandy Warren, Reid shared her story in the group's 68-page publication Making Waves for a New Dreaming in 2001.

Reid appeared in the 2014 historical television series, First Contact.

She was appointed one of the inaugural directors of the Coota Girls Aboriginal Corporation in 2013, and was an inaugural member and chairwoman of the Stolen Generations Advisory Committee in 2016. Her leadership and work were instrumental to the New South Wales Government offering a reparation package of $74 million to those forcibly removed under the Aborigines Protection Act 1909, until 1969.

Reid provided services to Indigenous students at Charles Sturt University in Wagga Wagga, including "cultural support and healing". She also performed the Welcome to Country at many university functions. She also contributed to the Healing Foundation, and was consulted or provided submissions for public inquiries at all levels of government.

Reid led a Black Lives Matter rally in 2020 in her home town of Wagga Wagga.

Aged 88 in 2021, she became the oldest living survivor of those forcibly removed under the Aborigines Protection Act 1909 (NSW). She has said that she is not bitter about the past, as her life has been a "bed of roses".

In 2022, Reid contributed to a collection of personal stories, by Wiradjuri Elders, titled Growing up Wiradjuri, edited by Anita Heiss, along with Stan Grant Snr and others.

In June 2023, Reid told her personal story as part of the launch of a new mental health campaign by Murrumbidgee Primary Health Network, in which she emphasised the importance of connection to culture and community.

== Recognition ==
On 13 December 2019, Reid was bestowed with the Order of the Companion of Charles Sturt University, "for her outstanding contribution to Charles Sturt and the broader community". The citation added that she was also commended "more generally as a Wiradjuri Elder and her firm belief that education is a powerful key to achieving reconciliation between Indigenous and non-Indigenous Australians".

In December 2020, she the mayor of Wagga Wagga held a mayoral reception in her honour, for her work in the community. Morning tea was provided for Reid along with her family and friends.

In 2021, she was the NSW State Recipient of Senior Australian of the Year.

Minister for Indigenous Australians, Ken Wyatt, paid homage to Aunty Isabel Reid on 13 February 2021, the 13th anniversary of Kevin Rudd's Apology to the Stolen Generations.

== Personal life ==
Reid married John Robert Reid, a shearer, and they moved to Wagga Wagga in 1970. They had eight children; one daughter died in 1993. They lived in self-constructed homes or tents, but had a happy home life and their children were well-fed.

== Publications ==
- Contributing author, Making Waves for a New Dreaming (2001)
- Contributing author, Growing up Wiradjuri (2022), ed. Anita Heiss
