= Joyce Williams =

Joyce Williams may refer to:

- Joyce Jacobs (1922–2013), sometimes credited as Joyce Williams
- Joy Williams (Australian writer) (1942–2006), also known as Joyce Williams
- Joyce Williams (actress), Playboy Bunny who portrays a character in Pretty Maids All in a Row
- Joyce Williams (tennis), Scottish tennis player
- Joyce D. Williams, actress who portrays Sarah Brown in Meet the Browns
