= Joy Williams (Australian writer) =

Aboriginal Australian writer

Joy Williams, born Eileen Williams and also known as Joyce Riley Williams, Joy Williams Wiradjuri, and Janaka Wiradjuri (13 September 1942 – 22 September 2006) was an Aboriginal Australian author of poetry and Indigenous rights activist.

== Biography ==
Joy Williams was born Eileen Williams at the Crown Street Women's Hospital in Sydney on 3 September 1942. Shortly after her birth Joy was taken from her mother by the Aboriginal Welfare Board and sent to the Bomaderry Aboriginal Children's Home. At the age of six she was sent to the Lutanda Children's Home run by the Plymouth Brethren, first at Wentworth Falls and later to Pennant Hills, Sydney. Williams was sent to Lutanda, where she was the only Indigenous resident, rather than the Cootamundra Domestic Training Home for Aboriginal Girls because of her fair skin.

Williams went to Hornsby Girls' High School and then at the insistence of the Brethren was sent to the Nurses' Home at Parramatta District Hospital at sixteen to become a nurses' aide. She was later sent to the North Ryde Psychiatric ward and while on weekend leave she became pregnant with her first child, a daughter. Being heavily sedated, Williams was forced to sign adoption papers.

In the 1970s Williams received her birth certificate and eventually met her mother. She enrolled in a Bachelor of Arts, English/History at Wollongong University and was the Regional Representative of the Aboriginal Consultative Group. Williams was actively involved with the Aboriginal Community Centre and the Royal Commission into Aboriginal Deaths in Custody. Her interest was in Black Literature and hoped that one day this would be taught at all levels throughout the education system. Williams was the first Aboriginal compensation test case against the NSW State Government for negligence by the Aboriginal Welfare Board who were responsible for her removal from her mother and the abuse she endured from the Homes she was sent to. She lost her case in the Supreme Court in August 1999. In 2000 Joy went to the New South Wales Court of Appeal; her case was heard by Chief Justice Spigelman, Justice Shellar and Justice Heydon and lost that also. On 22 June 2001 the High Court rejected an application for further leave to appeal.

Williams died on 22 September 2006 in Primbee, New South Wales.

== Writing ==
- Blackberry's Child. Sydney, New South Wales : Breakout Press, 1991.
