= Aborigines Act 1969 =

Defunct Australian statute

Parliament of New South Wales
- Long title: An Act to make provisions with respect to matters concerning Aborigines; to repeal the Aboriginal Protection Act, 1909, and certain other Acts; to amend the Attachment of Wages Limitation Act, 1957; and for purposes connected therewith.
- Citation: Act No. 7, 1969
- Royal assent: 20 March 1969

Repeals
- Aborigines Protection Act 1909

Repealed by
- Aboriginal Land Rights Act 1983
- Status: Repealed

The Aborigines Act 1969 was an Act of the Parliament of New South Wales that repealed the Aborigines Protection Act 1909, and alongside other regulations relating to Aboriginals in New South Wales.

In 1983, the Act was repealed by the Aboriginal Land Rights Act 1983. The originating bill was introduced to Parliament following approval of the second question of the 1967 Australian referendum.

== The Act ==
It abolished the Aborigines Welfare Board, included Aboriginal children under the same welfare legislation as non-Aboriginal children, amended the Attachment of Wages Limitation Act 1957 and made other provisions for Aboriginal people in the state of New South Wales.

The legislative changes introduced by the Act reflected the changing attitudes to Aboriginal people and the passage of the 1967 Australian referendum. The new Act established Aboriginal Welfare Services in the NSW Department of Child Welfare and Social Welfare; a Directorate of Aboriginal Welfare and the Aborigines Advisory Council.

=== Repeal ===
The Act was further amended in 1973 before its repeal in 1983 by the Aboriginal Land Rights Act 1983.

== See also ==
- Aborigines Protection Act 1909
- Aboriginal Land Rights Act 1983
- List of Aboriginal Reserves in New South Wales
