= Kinchela Aboriginal Boys' Training Home =

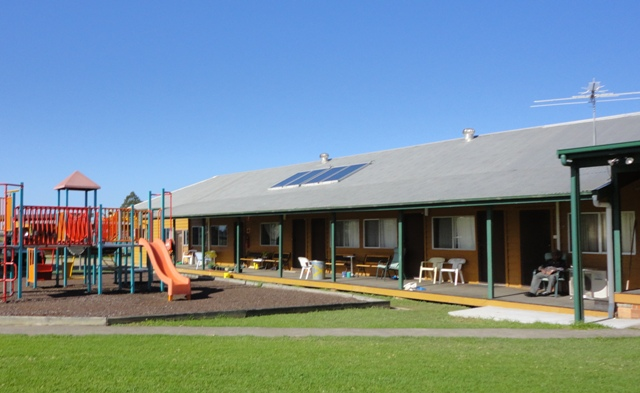
- Former school (from the east)

- Location within New South Wales Location within Australia
- 30.9765°S 152.9819°E
- Location: 2054 South West Rocks Road, Kinchela, Kempsey Shire, New South Wales, Australia

History
- Built: 1924–1970

Site notes
- Owner: Kempsey Local Aboriginal Land Council

New South Wales Heritage Register
- Official name: Kinchela Aboriginal Boys' Training Home; Kinchela Boys' Home; Aboriginal Mission School; The Mission;
- Type: state heritage (built)
- Designated: 17 February 2012
- Reference no.: 1875
- Type: Historic site
- Category: Aboriginal

Kinchela Aboriginal Boys' Training Home, also known as Kinchela Boys' Home and the Aboriginal Mission School, is a heritage-listed former Aboriginal Boys' Training Home at 2054 South West Rocks Road, Kinchela, Kempsey Shire, New South Wales, Australia. It was built from 1924 to 1970.

It was added to the New South Wales State Heritage Register on 17 February 2012. Today the property is owned by Kempsey Local Aboriginal Land Council. The site was also recognised in 2022 by the World Monuments Watch.

== Background ==
Aboriginal children were separated from their families from the earliest days of the colony. Governor Lachlan Macquarie established the first Native Institution in Parramatta as early as 1814 and, in 1823, another "native institution" was started in Blacktown (Blacktown Native Institution Site). Both those institutions were considered failures, one reason being that once parents realised their children wouldn't be allowed to come home, they wouldn't give them up. In the 1820s and 1830s, the Government of New South Wales also subsidised Christian missionary activity among the Aboriginal people, including that of the London Missionary Society. On the European settlement frontier of Wellington Valley, the Reverend Watson gained a reputation for stealing Aboriginal children and, as a consequence, the Wiradjuri hid their children from white men.

The spread of European settlers and their livestock resulted in conflict with the indigenous population, and their dispossession. The first bill for the protection of Aborigines was drafted by the New South Wales government in 1838, following the Myall Creek massacre in June of that year. Thus began a systemic government approach to the regulation and control of the lives of Aboriginal people that became ever tighter, until the success of the 1967 constitutional referendum brought significant change.

Before 1881, Aboriginal people in New South Wales were under the jurisdiction of the Colonial Secretary, police and the Lands Department. In 1880, a private body known as the New South Wales Aborigines Protection Association was formed and, following agitation by that body, the government of the colony of New South Wales appointed a Protector of Aborigines, George Thornton MLC. The Board for the Protection of Aborigines was subsequently created in 1883. "The objectives of the Board were to provide asylum for the aged and sick, who are dependent on others for help and support; but also, and of at least equal importance to train and teach the young, to fit them to take their places amongst the rest of the community". That objective became the basis of the future child removal policy, arising from he belief that the "inferiority" of Aborigines would only be dealt with by removing the children and educating them in a European setting.

In Darlington Point, Reverend Gribble established the Warangesda Aboriginal Mission in 1880 and, in 1883, set up a separate girls' dormitory. The girls were housed separately, in a building which included a dining room and kitchen, as well as the dormitory. Girls were brought in from many areas and were trained to be domestic servants. When Warangesda Mission became an Aboriginal Station in 1884, the Aboriginal Protection Board continued to send Aboriginal girls to the Warangesda girls' dormitory. It was the Warangesda Mission/Station girls' dormitory which became the model or prototype for the later Aboriginal Children's Training Homes at Cootamundra (Cootamundra Domestic Training Home for Aboriginal Girls) and Kinchela.

Frustrated by the lack of legislative power to control the education and lives of Aboriginal children, the Aborigines Protection Board successfully lobbied for a new act. In 1909, the Aborigines Protection Act 1909 was passed. The Board's Annual Reports of 1909 and 1911 show the emphasis on training of Aboriginal children. The Board felt limited by the Act because it only gave them direct control over children over 14 who could be apprenticed. To remove younger children they had to apply to a magistrate under the Neglected Children and Juvenile Offenders Act 1905. The Board was of the opinion that the children would only become good and proper members of "industrial society" if they were completely removed from their families and not allowed to return. The underlying assumption, as ever, was that Aboriginal people lacked the intellect to undertake anything but menial tasks. That later translated into the limits on the types of training provided: girls being trained for domestic service and the boys for labouring.

The Aborigines Protection Act was amended in 1915 and again in 1918, giving the Board the right "to assume full control and custody of the child of any aborigine, if after due inquiry it is satisfied that such a course is in the interest of the moral or physical welfare of such child. The Board may remove such child to such control and care as it thinks best." A court hearing was no longer necessary and, if parents wanted to challenge the seizure of their children, it was up to them to go to court.

The Depression and drought years of the 1920s and 1930s were particularly difficult for Aboriginal people. Conditions on the Aboriginal reserves which remained after the redistribution of land to soldier settlers, were poor and often overcrowded, so it was easy for the government to prove neglect and remove Aboriginal children. In 1937, in response to public pressure from academic and missionary groups sympathetic to Aboriginal people, a meeting of State and Commonwealth Aboriginal authorities was convened. The result was an official assimilation policy formed on the premise that "full-blood" Aborigines would be soon extinct and the "half-castes" should be absorbed into society. Meanwhile, Aboriginal people were organising to become a force of resistance. The sesquicentenary of the European colonisation of New South Wales in 1938 was marked by a National Day of Mourning and a call for the abolition of the Protection Board.

In 1940, the Aborigines Protection Board was abolished and replaced by the Aborigines Welfare Board. Aboriginal children then became subject to the Child Welfare Act 1939. Before an Aboriginal child could be removed from its family, there had to be a hearing before a magistrate, and the child had to be proven to be neglected or uncontrollable. Nevertheless, Aboriginal children continued to be sent to Cootamundra, Bomaderry and Kinchela, and some went to Mittagong or Boystown. There were no specific homes for uncontrollable Aboriginal children so they were sent to State corrective institutions such as Mt Penang or Parramatta Girls Home. The education of Aboriginal children had generally been one of segregation until, in 1940, the Department of Education officially took on the role.

In the 1960s, the work on "attachment theory" by British psychiatrist John Bowlby, began to influence the institutional care of children in Australia. It held that, for social and emotional development to occur normally, an infant needed to develop a relationship with at least one primary caregiver, rather than only being treated with affection as a reward ("cupboard love"), which was the prevailing theory. Fostering then became the preferred option and a more common occurrence. In accordance with the assimilation policy which was still in force, Aboriginal children were fostered with non-Aboriginal parents.

In May 1967, a referendum which changed the Australian constitution brought positive changes for the Aboriginal people. Responsibility for Aboriginal affairs passed from state governments to the Australian government. One resultant change was the abolition of the NSW Aborigines Welfare Board in 1969. After that, non-Aboriginal girls were admitted to Cootamundra Girls Home.

== Operation as a boys' home ==
The Board for the Protection of Aborigines gazetted the Kinchela Aboriginal Reserve on 23 April 1883. Kinchela (originally known as Arakoon) was gazetted as a village in 1885 or 1886. Dormitories were added to the Aboriginal Reserve in 1924 to accommodate the daughters of Aboriginal parents who lived too far from a school and boys who were transferred from Singleton Aboriginal Boys' Home.

The Kinchela village became a centre of shipping for produce and cattle on ocean-going steamers. Three sugar mills operated in the vicinity and the hamlet was the centre of a large maize growing area. Cheese making was an important industry and the village had a bakery and butchery, two churches, two schools, a post office and a hall.(4) Aboriginal people were excluded from the activities of the village and the local community successfully petitioned in the 1940s to prevent the Aboriginal boys from the home from attending the local school.

The precursor to Kinchela, Singleton Boys' Home, was established by the Board for the Protection of Aborigines in December 1918 on the grounds of a former mission. By the end of 1918 there were 46 boys accommodated there. The home was intended to accommodate the boys removed from their families under the Aborigines Protection (Amendment) Act until they were old enough to be sent out to work. The boys were to receive training whilst in the home so they could be gainfully employed in manual or agricultural work when they turned 15 years of age. They remained wards of the state until they were 18 and their income was held in trust by the Board. By 1923 eight boys had been placed in apprenticeships. By the end of 1923 the Board decided to dispose of the Singleton Home on the ground that the premises were unsuitable. The school on the grounds was officially closed on 15 January 1924 and the boys remaining at the home were transferred to Kinchela Aboriginal Boys' Training Home.

Established in 1924, the Kinchela Aboriginal Boys' Training Home had the same function as the Singleton Home. Under the Aborigines Protection Act boys between the ages of 5 and 15 were removed from their families if in the opinion of the Board (or those enacting its laws, the police or reserve managers) it was "in the interest of the moral or physical welfare" of the child. These boys were sent directly to Kinchela or if they had been taken at a younger age they were sent to Bomaderry Children's Home until they were old enough to be transferred to Kinchela. Once the boys were removed from their families and communities they became officially wards of the state until they were 18 years old.

From the 1920s until the 1940s the Kinchela Home was known as an extremely harsh and cruel environment. After this time the home is said to have improved; however, oral history shows that conditions were still appalling. When describing the difference between the Bomaderry Home and Kinchela, one former resident felt that whilst there were difficulties with Bomaderry they were too young to comprehend the impact of the separation from their families until much later. He felt that the United Aborigines Missionaries tried to provide a loving caring environment whereas Kinchela was an institution. He described the manager at the time, in 1935, as "dictatorial and aggressive". The staff were untrained and did not make the same efforts to provide a homely environment. The boys were referred to by number rather than name. Cases of beatings and sexual abuse are well documented. The cruelty was investigated in the 1940s and some staff were dismissed. The policy of segregation from the rest of society became more relaxed and boys were permitted to engage in activities outside the home.

The original dormitories constructed in 1924 were large "tin sheds"; these were replaced in 1935. The policy of assimilation was strictly enforced and anything connecting the boys to their Aboriginal culture was prohibited. The use of Aboriginal languages was banned in the home. The boys could go to the annual Kempsey show but they were prohibited from speaking with other Aboriginal people.

The first Aboriginal school in the area (Pelican Island Aboriginal Provisional School) was established in 1892 but only functioned for a year. In 1919 another school called the Pelican Island Provisional School was established, apparently on the Aboriginal reserve, and in July 1928 it was renamed the Kinchela Aboriginal Provisional School, becoming an integral part of the Kinchela Boys' Home. It operated until 1941 when the school was closed and re-opened as Kinchela Aboriginal Public School, which offered basic elementary education at a primary school level.

According to former "Home Boys", the Provisional School was staffed by the manager of the Home or other staff members and on some occasions an elder boy. None of these were trained teachers and as a consequence the standard of education until 1941 was extremely poor. The boys were not permitted to attend the local Kinchela School. When Kinchela School was asked by the local school inspectors to accept the boys from the Home the parents of the white children voted thirty three votes to one against the proposal. The Kinchela community voted again in the 1960s permitting Aboriginal students to attend the Kinchela School. A new school was built in 1941 (Kinchela Aboriginal Public School) and for the first time trained teachers were employed. Boys were also permitted to attend the high school in Kempsey after this time. The Kinchela Aboriginal Public School operated until 1962. The original Admissions Register, Punishment Books and Visitors Book for the Kinchela Aboriginal School can be found in the NSW State Archives. After the closure of the school the boys attended West Kempsey Primary School.

Kinchela Boys Home was 16 mi (26 km) from Kempsey on 32 acres (13 ha) of land alongside the Macleay River. In 1952 the home was described in Dawn magazine (published by the Aborigines Welfare Board) as having lawns, gardens, swimming pool and a playground. Around 29 acres (12 ha) of the land was given over to a large vegetable garden and a dairy herd of 33 head and four horses. Weekly church services were held at the home together with Sunday school. The boys also participated in local sports activities during the 1950s, gaining a reputation in swimming, football, boxing and surf lifesaving.

The location of the home on the river flats next to the Macleay River caused flooding problems on numerous occasions (as recorded in Dawn magazine in 1954 and 1956). After 1959 whenever the Home flooded the boys would be relocated to the Aboriginal Reserve at South West Rocks in the former South West Rocks Public School buildings. They would also use this place as a base for their South West Rocks sporting events and school holidays. Dawn magazine of December 1954 described the Home: "buildings of a simple design and comprise dormitories, dining room, recreation room, kitchen, ablution block and the usual out buildings and school." The same article notes some boys were given the privilege of attending the local picture theatre in Kempsey. If they attended with a white friend they could sit in the general area, while other Aboriginal people had to sit in a segregated area of the theatre.

== Closure ==
Increasing Aboriginal activism together with the positive results of the 1967 Referendum which changed the Australian Constitution to include Aboriginal people, finally led to the abolition of the Aborigines Welfare Board and changes to the way Aboriginal children were removed and segregated. The Kinchela Aboriginal Boys' Training Home was closed in 1970. After closure of the Home the Aboriginal community lobbied to keep it for the control and use of the Aboriginal community. The Minister for Child and Social Welfare determined the site would be sold and advertised it to be auctioned on 5 May 1972. Thanks to the advocacy of strong Aboriginal voices, such as Mary Duroux, the government overturned its decision and the former home was passed into Aboriginal ownership.

The former Kinchela Aboriginal Boys' Training Home now belongs to the Kempsey Local Aboriginal Land Council. The Land Council leased it to Benelong's Haven, a drug and alcohol rehabilitation centre for Aboriginal people, for 41 years from 1976 to 2017. The organisation renovated the site, which had been described as "derelict" when they moved in. It went into liquidation and ceased operations on 5 December 2017. A future use for the site has not been determined.

The former Kinchela Aboriginal Boys' Training Home is a place which is connected to very difficult memories. In 2002 a Kinchela Boys' Home Reunion was held at the site. Former residents describe the loneliness, fear, physical hardship and abuse they suffered at the home. They describe how their lives have been irreparably damaged as a result. At the time of the reunion their experiences were recorded in the local paper: "Jail was not as hard as that place. I can't remember a day I wasn't caned." One man described being made to walk on his knees for five hours whilst holding a metal bar above his head. "All the boys were made to line up and every one, about 60, had to bash me as I walked down the line. If they didn't, they were made to follow behind me and be bashed themselves." The Deputy Premier of New South Wales and Minister for Aboriginal Affairs used the occasion to formally apologise to the former Home Boys and congratulated them on their courage in returning.

== Description of the site ==
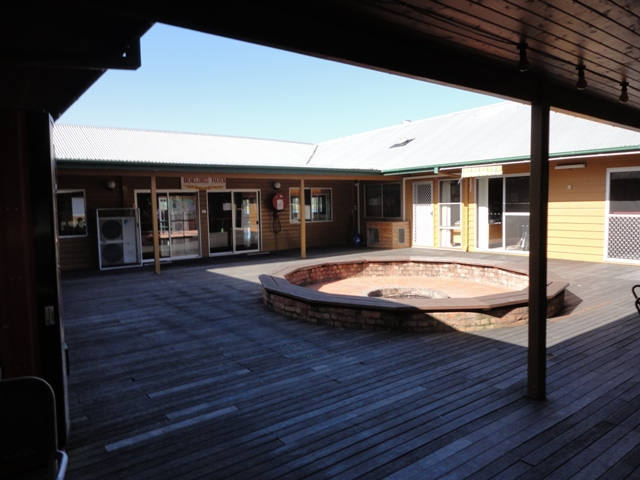
Former courtyard with former big boys dorm in centre and former recreation hall on right

The former Kinchela Aboriginal Boys' Training Home is located on two parcels of land separated by a parcel of freehold land, 16 miles from Kempsey. The smaller parcel of 2 acres 3 rods and 38 perches fronts South West Rocks Road alongside the Macleay River. This parcel corresponds with Aboriginal Reserve AR174 gazetted 23/4/1883. This parcel contains all the buildings used for dormitories, staff accommodation, recreation, dining and the school as well as ancillary building such as the wood store. The other parcel is accessed via an unformed lane on the northern boundary called Herborn Street. The second parcel of 29 acres 2 rods and 20 perches was farming land with milking sheds and a chook shed located in the north western corner. The north western corner of this lot also contains significant trees including a large Ficus and a group of Bunya Pines.

The property is low lying and floods frequently, i.e. almost on an annual basis. At the time of inspection in June 2011 the farm lot was under water and the property had recently been cut off for 6 days.

The original dormitories constructed in 1924 were large "tin sheds"; these were replaced in 1935. The new school constructed at this time was a long rectangular building clad in fibro with a hipped corrugated steel roof. At the eastern end of the building was the "all weather shed" where boys would go for recreation in wet weather. This open room has since been enclosed.

The main home building was designed in a U-shape with its open end facing the road. The recreation hall/ gymnasium and dining rooms were located in the southern wing. The big boys dormitory was located in the centre and the small boys dormitory was located in the northern wing. The centre of the U was used for assembly and the boys would march from here around to the separate school building that was located on the northern side of the main building. Kitchens and stores were located behind the main building. All of these building have since been adapted for use by Benelong Haven.

There was a laundry building on the southern boundary but this has been demolished. There was also a managers' residence at the front on the southern boundary that has been demolished. Out the front was also an orchard and was generally a "no go" area for the boys.

There are two intact staff residences at the northern end of the property facing the road. Between these buildings and the school were the football field and the swimming pool. Along the eastern boundary of the front lot were a number of ancillary buildings housing the milk separator, stores and a wood shed which doubled as a punishment room.

Benelong Haven took over the use of the property in 1976, several years after the Home was closed. The former home buildings were then renovated in 1988. The buildings were re-clad, reroofed and refurbished. A verandah was constructed interconnecting the complex of main buildings so that it could function during floods, fit outs were made for offices and accommodation and three new houses were built next to the former football field. The swimming pool has been filled in and the managers house has been demolished.

The buildings were reported to be in good condition as at 7 July 2011. The property is reasonably intact. The layout had been retained, but some buildings had been re-clad and adapted to other uses.

== Heritage listing and historical significance ==
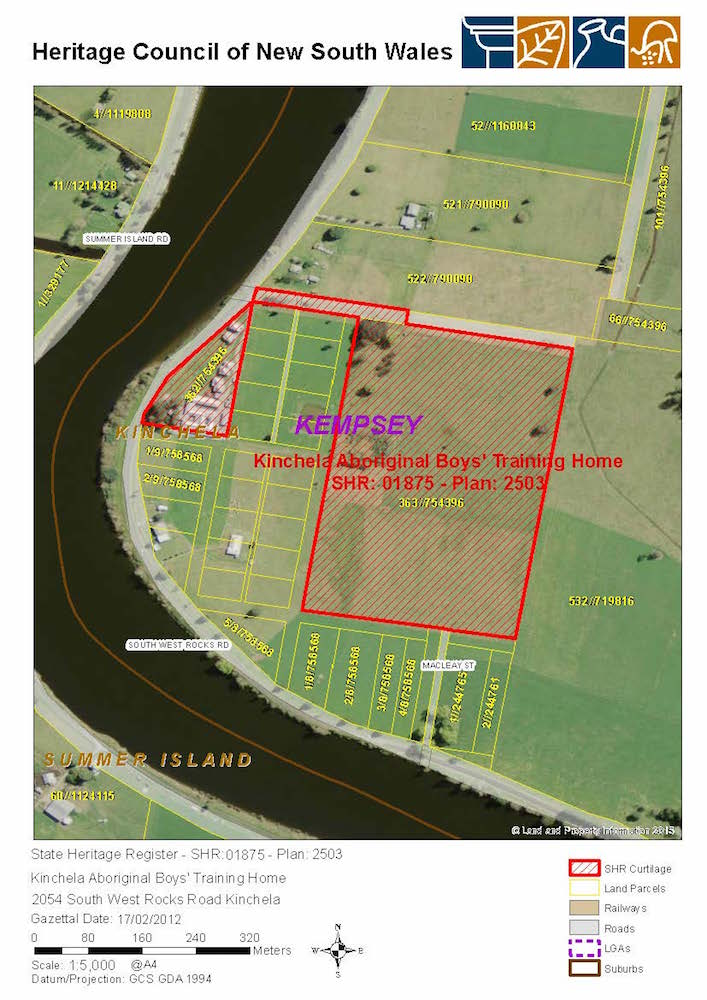
Heritage boundaries

The policies and practices of the New South Wales Government described below are historic and are not current policies and practices.

The former Kinchela Aboriginal Boys' Training Home provides tangible evidence of the historic Government policy and practice of taking Aboriginal children away from their families and communities, severing all ties with their culture in order to assimilate them into white Australian society. Placement of Aboriginal boys in an institution that has become notoriously known as a place where cruelty, abuse and deprivation were an everyday occurrence, has caused ongoing health problems and cultural dislocation for the former residents and associated problems within the Aboriginal community. The place is associated with commemoration and healing of these individuals and communities and is a means to reconnect to the past.

The former Kinchela Aboriginal Boys' Training Home provides historical evidence of the Government policy of assimilation that was based on Social Darwinism or the premise that "full blood" Aborigines would die out and the "mixed race" Aboriginals would soon have their Aboriginality bred out. The former Kinchela Aboriginal Boys' Training Home is evidence of the plan to train Aboriginal boys to become agricultural labourers demonstrating the prevalent ideology of the early and mid twentieth century that Aboriginal people were inferior in intelligence and only fit to become the servants of the rest of society.

The Boys' Home provides an example of the historical practice of Aboriginal wards of the State being denied their Aboriginality and cultural heritage. This was the subject of a National Inquiry into the Separation of Aboriginal and Torres Strait Islander Children from their Families in 1997 (Commission of Inquiry). The nation was made aware of how widespread the practice of removal was, which affected every Aboriginal community but was outside the consciousness of mainstream Australians. The Kinchela Aboriginal Boys' Training Home provides contemporary Australia with physical evidence as a means to comprehend the pain and suffering inflicted by past assimilation practices.

The former Home is a rare example of an Aboriginal Boys' Home in NSW and has the potential to provide insight into the accommodation and training of Aboriginal wards of the State in the first half of the twentieth century.

Kinchela Aboriginal Boys' Training Home was listed on the New South Wales State Heritage Register on 17 February 2012 having satisfied the following criteria.

The place is important in demonstrating the course, or pattern, of cultural or natural history in New South Wales.

The former Kinchela Aboriginal Boys' Training Home provides tangible evidence of the social theory and subsequent Government policy which controlled the lives of Aboriginal people throughout the 20th century. The belief that Aboriginal people were a "child" race and had to be protected for their own good, carried over from the 19th century and was enshrined as Government policy through the Aborigines Protection Board, which later became the Aborigines Welfare Board. The Boys' Home is a direct example of how the Board's policies were implemented and the government acted as a paternalistic force in Aboriginal lives. The Boys' Home provides physical evidence of the Government policy of assimilation as a means to empty the Aboriginal Reserves and force Aboriginal people to live like the rest of society. The training of children and removal from their families and culture was to provide them with the skills necessary, albeit as the servants to the rest of society. The Boys' Home as a training facility emphasised labouring and agricultural careers demonstrating the entrenched social theory of the 19th and greater part of the 20th centuries that Aboriginal people were inferior in intelligence and only capable of manual tasks. The employment of a former resident as a manager in the two years before the home closed, demonstrates the beginning of changing attitudes at the time of the Constitutional referendum concerning Aboriginal rights in 1967. The home provides historical evidence of the ethnocentric attitudes of mainstream Australian society which denied Aboriginal culture a place in that society until the 1967 Referendum. It demonstrates the implementation of Social Darwinism as Government policy which believed that "full blood Aborigines" would become extinct and the rest of the "half caste " population would be assimilated or absorbed into white society.

The place has a strong or special association with a person, or group of persons, of importance of cultural or natural history of New South Wales's history.

The former Kinchela Aboriginal Boys' Training Home is directly associated with the Aborigines Protection Board and the Aborigines Welfare Board. The Home is associated with Cootamundra Aboriginal Girls' Training Home to which many of the sisters of the boys sent to Kinchela, were sent. The Home is also associated with Bomaderry Children's Home where babies and young children were sent before being transferred to Kinchela Aboriginal Boys' Training Home. The Home provides an example of the historical practice of Aboriginal wards of the State being denied their Aboriginality and cultural heritage which was the subject of a National Inquiry into the Separation of Aboriginal and Torres Strait Islander Children from the Families in 1997 (Commission of Inquiry). The Home is associated with prominent individual Burnam Burnam ( Harry Penrith 1936-1997). The Home is also associated with Link-Up an organisation formed to unite former residents and families of children's homes. The Home is associated with the National Apology to the Stolen Generations in Federal Parliament in 2008 by Prime Minister Kevin Rudd. The property has association with Benelong Aboriginal Drug and Alcohol Rehabilitation Hostel which occupies the property today.

The place has a strong or special association with a particular community or cultural group in New South Wales for social, cultural or spiritual reasons.

The Kinchela Aboriginal Boys' Training Home has strong social significance for former residents and for the families and communities from whom the boys were taken. The place is associated with stories of deep personal grief and social and cultural dislocation and has also been demonstrated to be associated with ongoing heath issues for some past residents. The Home buildings provide a tangible link to the past for former residents. Memories associated with the place whether painful or not, are revisited when former residents visit the former home. Some former residents speak of the healing process experienced when returning whilst others don't ever want to return. Kinchela Aboriginal Boys' Training Home provides contemporary Australia with evidence of the practice of removing Aboriginal children from their families. This practice affected the lives of every Aboriginal Australian but was largely outside the consciousness of mainstream Australians until the 1997 Commission of Inquiry. The Home provides verification of past assimilation practices and the potential for greater understanding and compassion towards those who suffered as a result. The home provides evidence of the ongoing public debate which polarised the Australian community with the publication of the findings of the Commission of Inquiry in 1997. There was considerable debate, particularly over whether there should be a public apology to the "stolen generations". In 2008 the Prime Minister issued a public apology. The assimilation policies and removal of children have created ongoing issues for contemporary Aboriginal communities which have to deal with the cultural divergence that is the result of some Aboriginal people being raised in non-Aboriginal families or institutions.

The place has potential to yield information that will contribute to an understanding of the cultural or natural history of New South Wales.

The former Kinchela Aboriginal Boys' Training Home buildings provide evidence of the conditions experienced in the children's homes from 1924 until the 1970s. The original buildings together with descriptions of their former use, provide an insight into the domestic routine and the life of the home and methods used in raising Aboriginal wards of the State. Many of the oral histories of former residents describe the routine at the Home. The use of the former Home buildings reflects the early 20th century practice of placing Wards of the State in dormitories, divided by age.

The place possesses uncommon, rare or endangered aspects of the cultural or natural history of New South Wales.

The Kinchela Aboriginal Boys' Training Home is the only surviving Aboriginal boys' training home in NSW. It was the longest surviving Aboriginal training facility for boys. The place has rarity as the only surviving built evidence of the assimilation policies which dictated that Aboriginal boys be institutionalised and trained as labourers in NSW.

The place is important in demonstrating the principal characteristics of a class of cultural or natural places/environments in New South Wales.

The former Home is representative of the systemic historic government practice of assimilation of Aboriginal people during the 20th century.

=== International significance ===
The site was recognised in 2022 by the World Monuments Watch.

== See also ==
- Cootamundra Domestic Training Home for Aboriginal Girls
