= Lola Edwards =

Australian Aboriginal activist

Lola Edwards (aka Lola McNaughton, 1946–2011) was a founding member of Link-up (NSW) and a strong advocate for Aboriginal and Torres Strait Islander people who were forcibly removed from their families, later dubbed the Stolen Generations.

== Early life ==
Lola Edwards was born in 1946 was a member of the Stolen Generations and grew up in Tingha, NSW. Her mother was a Ngarabal woman and father was a Kamilaroi man. Her father was what Aboriginal people would call an "old bush lawyer" and would regularly be an advocate for Aboriginal people in court. Edwards and her family always believed this was the reason they were taken.

When she was four years old, in 1951, Lola was taken away with her older and younger sisters and her brother Gordon from her family by the Aboriginal Welfare board. They were picked up and taken to the train at Inverell to Sydney, her brother Gordon was separated at Central Railway Station, then Lola and her sisters were put on the train to Cootamundra. Edwards didn't see her mother until many years after and never met her father as he died before she was released.

== Cootamundra Girls Home ==
Edwards spent 11 years at the Cootamundra Domestic Training Home for Aboriginal Girls in NSW, where she was taken after being removed from her family. This institution opened from 1912 and closed in 1969. Girls there were trained to be domestic servants; Edwards was trained to be telephonists and then worked at the home, while others did typing courses.

Edwards did not go back to visit the home until 1980, 31 years after she was placed there. In an interview in 2008, Edwards recalled that another girl at the home used to talk to herself at night in bed and told Edwards she was trying to remember her language under the blankets. Edwards also said that she believed she and the other girls at the home where being raised "to think white and act white and keep herself clean, scrub her skin, take the black off her skin".

== Work ==
When Edwards was 16 years old, she was placed out to work in the township of Junee, where looked after a baby and a little boy. The couple she worked for owned a local taxi service and Edwards would clean the house, do the washing, do the cooking and man the taxi base.

Years later she married Bill Edwards, and moved to San Francisco, United States. While she was living in San Francisco she got a phone call from her sister asking if she wanted to come down and meet her mother. The reunification with her mother made Edwards decide to move back to Australia and find out more about her family and lost culture.

Edwards' sister started Link-Up with Dr Peter Read and Edwards became very passionate about the organisation. When Edwards started her work with Link-Up, she was required to go down and do the searches for people who asked them to, for their files at the state records. Edwards was then asked to be a member of the Indigenous Advisory Council for the National Inquiry into the Separation of Aboriginal and Torres Strait Islander Children from Their Families, led by former Human Rights Commissioner and Commission President, Sir Ronald Wilson, and former Aboriginal and Torres Strait Islander Social Justice Commissioner, Mick Dodson. Edwards played a critical role in ensuring the stories of the Stolen Generations were heard. The Commission's 1997 report Bringing Them Home was the result of this Inquiry. Her contribution to this Inquiry, along with her lifetime of advocacy, has contributed to ensuring that this part of Australia's history is acknowledged and known by all Australians.

== Achievements and recognition ==
Edwards won the Tony Fitzgerald Memorial Award at the annual Australian Human Rights Commission's Human Rights Awards in Sydney on 9 December 2011. The award recognises individuals with a proven track record in promoting and advancing human rights in the Australian community on a not-for-profit basis. Bill Pritchard, her husband, who accepted the award, said: “This is a true acknowledgement of Lola’s lifetime passion of seeking social justice for Aboriginal people and especially for those members of the Stolen Generations who continue to be disadvantaged.” In 1995–96, together with the late Carol Kendall, Lola was appointed to the specialist team for Link-up (NSW) which travelled extensively throughout NSW conducting 30 preparatory forums to assist Aboriginal and Torres Strait Islander people, including members of the Stolen Generations, to give evidence to the Australian Human Rights Commission's Inquiry into the Separation of Aboriginal People from Their Families. Lola was also the inaugural chairperson of the National Sorry Day Committee.
