= Bomaderry =

Suburb in Australia

- Suburb
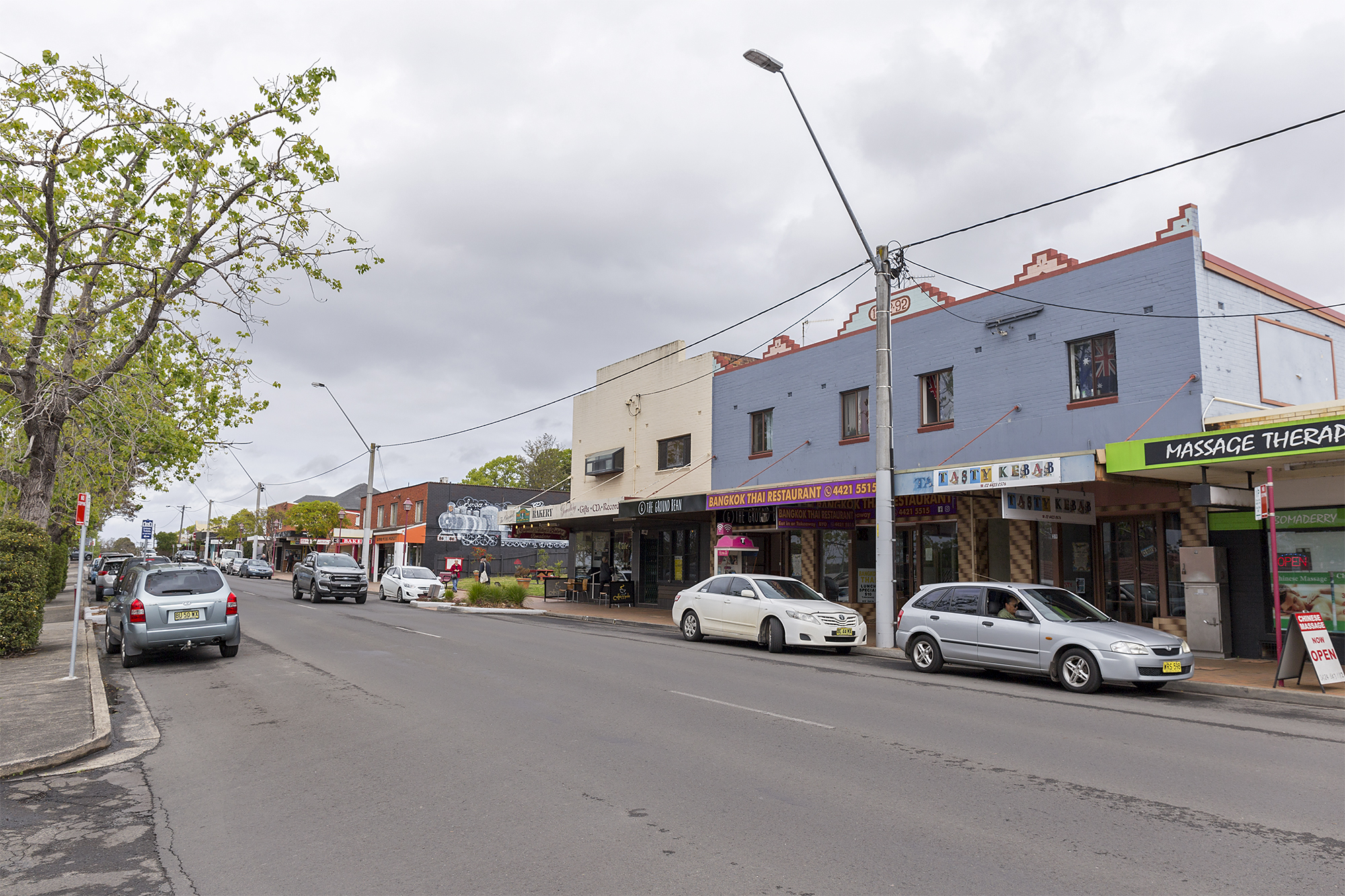
- Meroo Street in Bomaderry

- Coordinates: 34.848°S 150.605°E
- Country: Australia
- State: New South Wales
- City: Shoalhaven
- LGA: City of Shoalhaven
- Location: 154 km (96 mi) S of Sydney CBD; 15 km (9.3 mi) SW of Berry; 14 km (8.7 mi) W of Shoalhaven Heads; 6 km (3.7 mi) N of Nowra
- Established: 1892

Government
  - State electorate: Kiama
  - Federal division: Gilmore
- Elevation: 12 m (39 ft)
- Postcode: 2541
Suburbs around Bomaderry
Cambewarra	Meroo Meadow	Meroo Meadow
North Nowra	Bomaderry	Bolong
North Nowra	Nowra	Terara

Bomaderry is a suburb in the City of Shoalhaven local government area in New South Wales, Australia. At the 2021 census, it had a population of 6,738 people. It is on the north shore of the Shoalhaven River, across the river from Nowra, the major town of the City of Shoalhaven, of which Bomaderry is locally regarded as being a suburb of the city.

== History ==
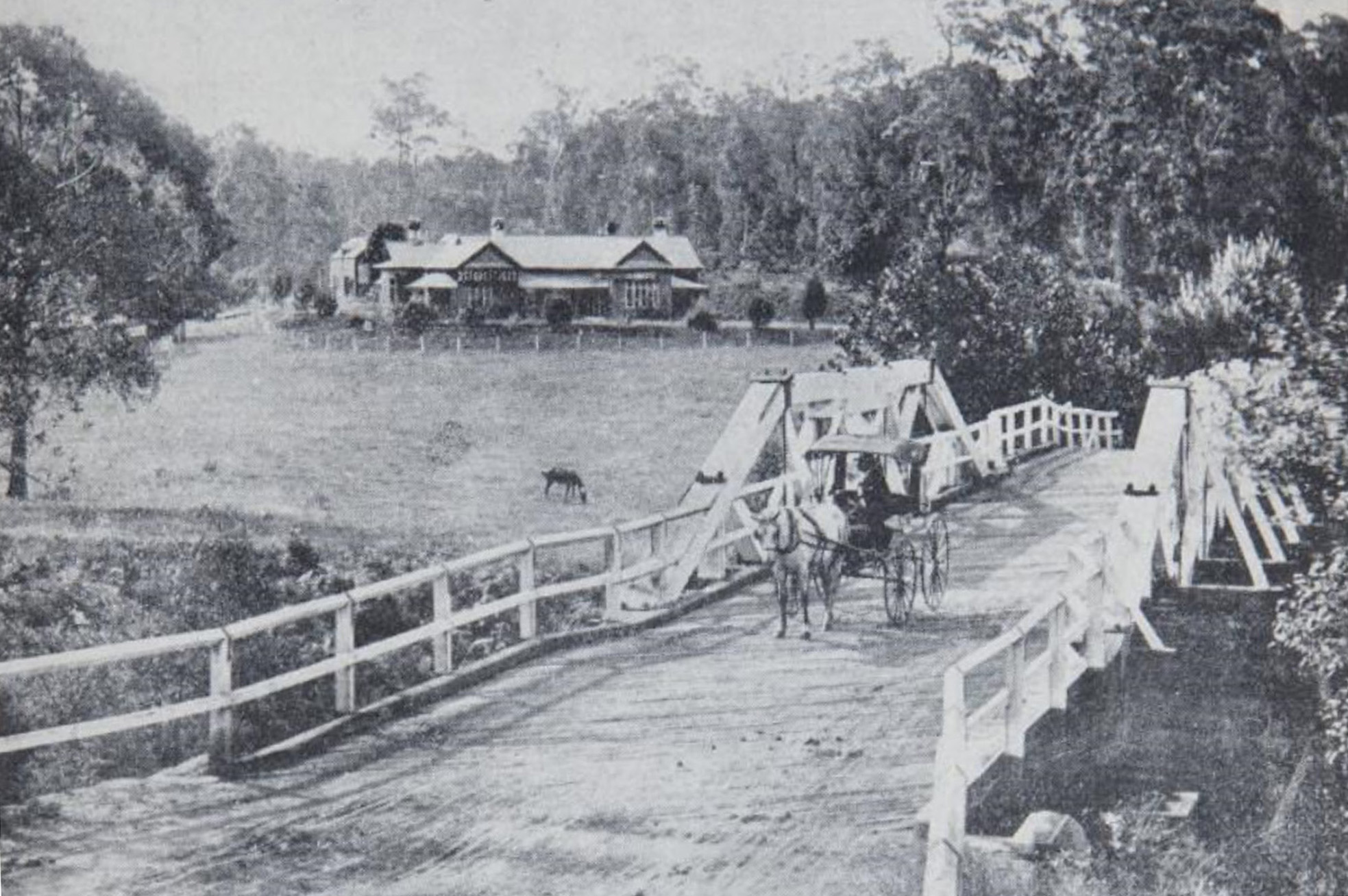
Lynburn, Bomaderry 1903

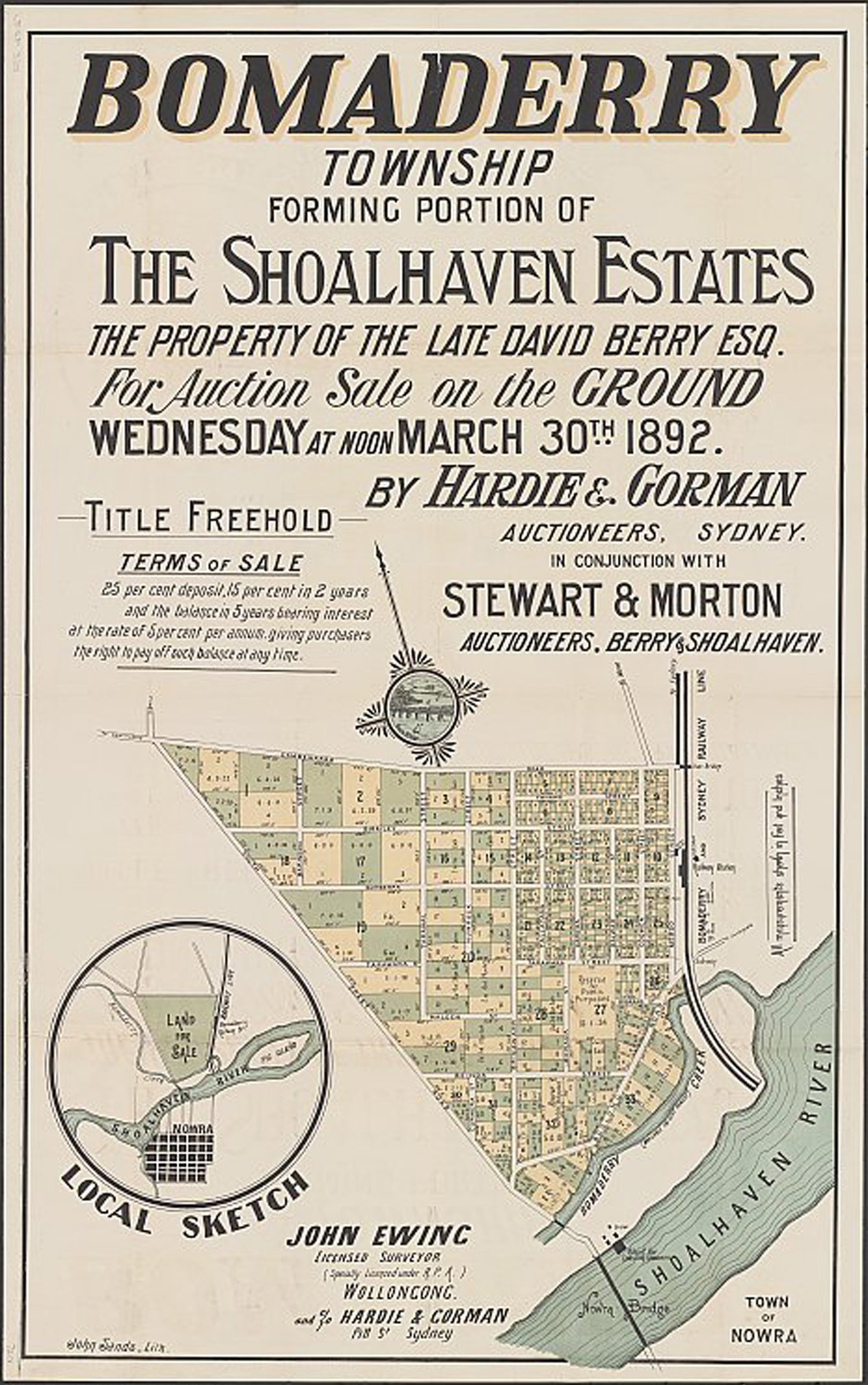
Subdivision map of Bomaderry 1892

Bomaderry township was opened in 1882. It was previously part of the Shoalhaven Estate owned by David Berry whose brother Alexander Berry had built a road to the area in 1858. When David died in 1889 the estate was sold in portions. The subdivision plans for Bomaderry are shown. In 1893 the railway was extended to Bomaderry and the town began to grow from this time.

One of the first houses in Bomaderry was Lynburn which still exists today. It was built in 1895 by the architect Howard Joseland for Jane Morton, the widow of Henry Gordon Morton, the manager of the Shoalhaven Estate. A photo shortly after its construction is shown. The road over the bridge in the photo is now the Princes Highway where it crosses Bomaderry Creek.

After the town opened in 1892 several factories moved into the area. Messrs Denham Bros. built a bacon and ham factory in about 1900. A milk condensery opened in 1901 which was originally located near the railway station but later moved to the bank of the Shoalhaven River close to Bolong Road. In 1912, the Nowra Co-op Dairy Company established a milk Depot at Bomaderry and this was a major boost to the local economy for many years.

== Heritage listings ==
Bomaderry has 2 heritage-listed sites, including:

- 59 Beinda Street: Bomaderry Aboriginal Children's Home
- Illawarra railway: Bomaderry railway station

== Transport ==
Its railway station is the terminus of the South Coast railway line, which is part of the Sydney Trains intercity network. Bomaderry has public bus services both within the suburb and to neighbouring areas. These were significantly expanded in 2020, with 45 new routes announced.

== Education ==
Bomaderry High School is one of the major high schools in the Shoalhaven, holding places in state debating, public speaking, sporting and dance eisteddfod. Nowra Anglican College is a K–12 school located in Bomaderry. Bomaderry Public School is the main primary school in the area with over 400 students.

== Population ==
According to the 2021 census, there were 6,738 people in Bomaderry.

- The median age of people in Bomaderry was 45 years.
- Children aged 0–14 years made up 16.6% of the population.
- People aged 65 years and over made up 26.8% of the population.
- Aboriginal and Torres Strait Islander people made up 8.5% of the population.
- 79.7% of people were born in Australia. The next most common country of birth was England at 3.9%, followed by New Zealand at 1.1%, the Philippines at 1.1%, India at 0.7%, and Scotland at 0.4%.
- 87.8% of people spoke only English at home, the next most common language spoken at home include Tagalog at 0.5%, Spanish at 0.4%, Nepali at 0.4%, Auslan at 0.2%, and Vietnamese at 0.2%.
- The most common responses for religion were No Religion at 40.5%, Anglican at 18.0%, Catholic at 17.0%, and the Uniting Church at 3.1%.
