= Kinchela, New South Wales =

Coordinates: 30°59′37″S 152°59′30″E

Kinchela is a village in the Mid North Coast region of New South Wales, Australia, The village is named after Kinchela Creek, which in turn may have been named after John Kinchela, Attorney General of New South Wales in 1831. The Kinchela Aboriginal Reserve was gazetted in 1883, Kinchela was gazetted as a village in 1885 or 1886, and in 1892 an Aboriginal school was established at Pelican Island, near Kinchela.

== Kinchela Boys Home ==
Kinchela Boys Home was established by the Aboriginal Protection Board in 1924 and absorbed the Aboriginal school. The home was intended for Aboriginal children who were stolen from their families as part of the process of 'assimilating' them into white Australian society. The victims of this process eventually became known as the Stolen Generation. Kinchela Boys Home housed between 400 and 600 boys between 1924 and its closure in 1970. Bringing Them Home, the report of the National Inquiry into the Separation of Aboriginal and Torres Strait Islander Children from their Families, documents the brutal punishment and sexual abuse suffered by these boys.

In 1980, Kinchela Boys Home was converted into a drug and alcohol rehabilitation centre ('Bennelong’s Haven') for the local Aboriginal community, a number of whom were former Kinchela boys.

In 2012, Kinchela Boys Home was given the highest level of heritage protection available in New South Wales.

One of a pair of gates that originally formed the front gates of Kinchela Boys Home is now in the collection of the National Museum of Australia. A group of men, who had all been Kinchela boys, officially handed the gate over to the museum at a small ceremony in Kempsey in 2012. As part of the museum's collection, the gate will represent the stories of the Kinchela boys' experiences.

=== Kinchela Boys Home Aboriginal Corporation ===
Kinchela Boys Home Aboriginal Corporation (KBHAC) was established in 2001 after some former Kinchela Boys Home inmates asked World Vision Australia to assist them in reuniting boys who had spent time at the Kinchela home and help them develop an organisation for all former inmates and their families. KBHAC seeks '... to reconnect members of the Stolen Generations to their families, clans and communities. It works to restore and reconstruct cultural identity, pride and self-worth.

In 2001, the Kinchela Boys Home Aboriginal Corporation Strategic Plan was launched at Redfern Community Centre by the Governor of New South Wales, Professor Marie Bashir. This Strategic Plan for members of the Stolen Generation identified positive solutions for Aboriginal families and communities suffering from the trauma of forced removal.

== Heritage listings ==
Kinchela has a number of heritage-listed sites, including:

- 2054 South West Rocks Road: Kinchela Aboriginal Boys' Training Home
