= Aborigines Protection Act 1909 =

New South Wales legislation, repealed

Parliament of New South Wales
- Long title: An Act to provide for the protection and care of aborigines; to repeal the Supply of Liquors to Aborigines Prevention Act; to amend the Vagrancy Act, 1902, and the Police Offences (Amendment) Act, 1908; and for purposes consequent thereon or incidental thereto.
- Citation: Act No. 25, 1909
- Royal assent: 20 December 1909

Repeals
- Supply of Liquors to Aborigines Prevention Act 1867

Repealed by
- Aborigines Act 1969
- Status: Repealed

The Aborigines Protection Act 1909 (NSW) was an Act of the Parliament of New South Wales that repealed the Supply of Liquors to Aborigines Prevention Act 1867, with the aim of providing for the paternalistic protection and care of Aboriginal people in New South Wales. The originating bill was introduced to Parliament in the same year it was enacted, and was the first piece of legislation that dealt specifically with Aboriginals in the State.

The Act gave the States' Aboriginal Protection Board control of the Aboriginal reserves in New South Wales, and those that occupied them. Amendments to the Act later gave the Aborigines Protection Board in New South Wales broad powers to remove Aboriginal children from their families, resulting in the Stolen Generations. In 1969, the Act was finally repealed by the Aborigines Act 1969.

== The Act ==
It repealed the Supply of Liquors to Aborigines Prevention Act 1867, amended the Vagrancy Act 1902, and the Police Offences (Amendment) Act 1908 with the aim to provide for the protection and care of Aboriginal people in New South Wales.

The Act gave the Board for the Protection of Aborigines control of the Aboriginal reserves in New South Wales, and the lives of the Aboriginal people who lived on these reserves. The Act applied to all Aboriginal people but contained particular provisions for children.

== Amendments ==
In 1915, an amendment to the Act gave the Aborigines Protection Board the power to remove any Aboriginal child from their family at any time and for any reason.

“The Board may assume full control and custody of the child of any aborigine, if after due inquiry it is satisfied that such a course is in the interest of the moral and physical welfare of such child. The Board may thereupon remove such child to such control and care as it thinks best.” Section 13A, Aborigines Protection Amending Act 1915

This amended section led numerous removals and directly resulted in the Stolen Generations. The Aborigines Protection Act 1909 was further amended in 1918, 1936, 1940, 1943 and 1964.

=== Repeal ===
The Aborigines Protection Act 1909 was repealed in 1969 by the Aborigines Act 1969; however the legacy of the legislation affected many Aboriginal families and members of the Stolen Generations in New South Wales.

== See also ==
- Aborigines Act 1969
- Aboriginal Land Rights Act 1983

== Bibliography ==
- Haskins, Victoria (April 2003). "'Could you see to the return of my daughter': Fathers and daughters under the New South Wales Aborigines protection board child removal policy". Australian Historical Studies. 34 (121): 106–121. doi:10.1080/10314610308596239. ISSN 1031-461X.
- Burney, Linda (March 1994). "An aboriginal way of being Australian". Australian Feminist Studies. 9 (19): 17–24. doi:10.1080/08164649.1994.9994722. ISSN 0816-4649.
