= J. B. Gribble =

Australian Anglican missionary

John Brown Gribble FRGS (1 September 1847 – 3 June 1893) was an Australian minister of religion, noted for his missionary work among Aboriginal people in New South Wales, Western Australia and Queensland. His appointment in Western Australia was cancelled within a year due to hostility from squatters and others who had Aboriginal employees.

== History ==
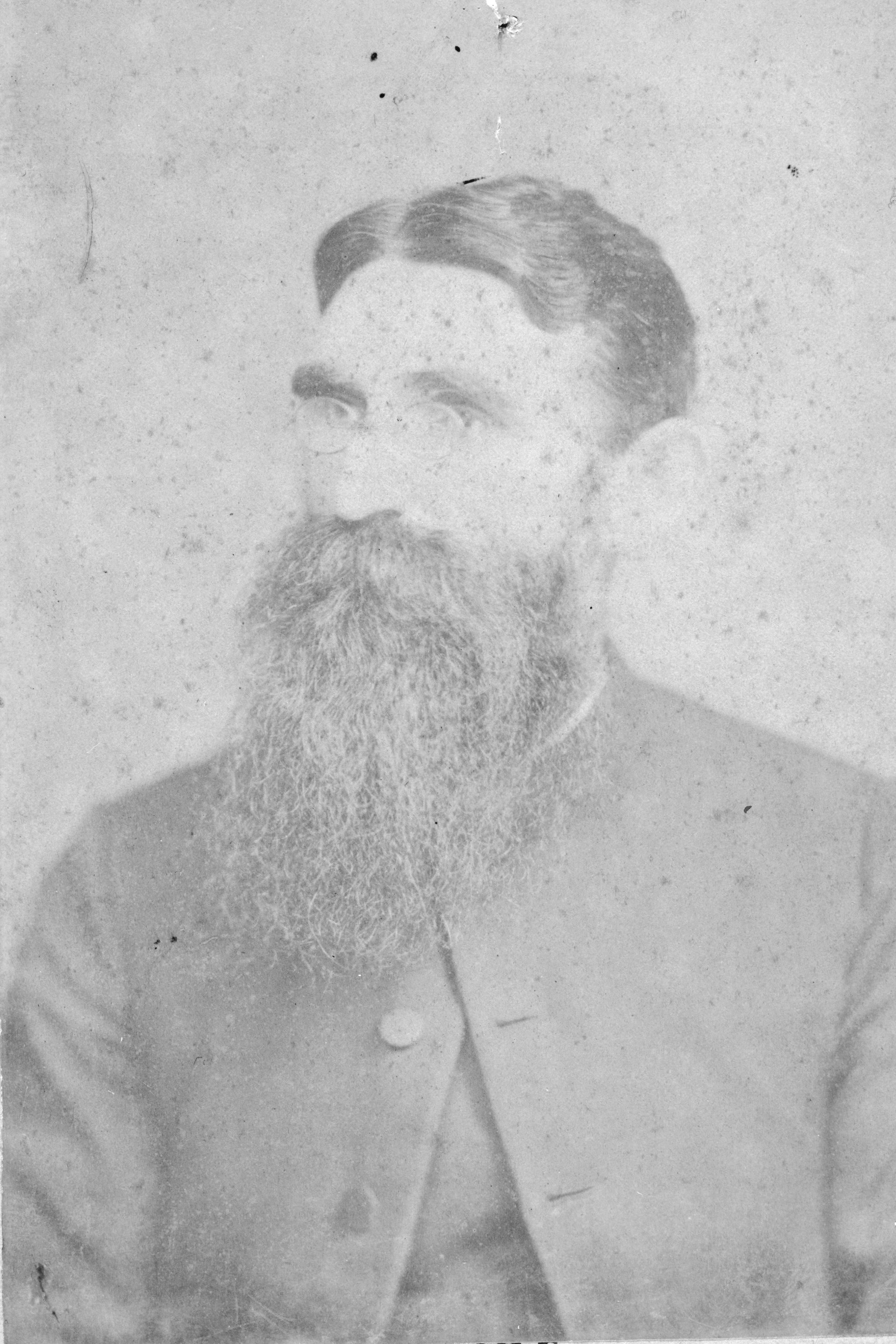
John Brown Gribble, c. 1890

Gribble was born at Redruth, Cornwall, a son of miner Benjamin Gribble (1810–1866) and Mary Gribble, née Brown (1808 – 20 January 1887), and as a young man emigrated with his parents to Victoria, Australia. He was devoutly religious, and early chose the life of a Congregational Minister, serving in Rutherglen around 1876, and in 1878 moved to Jerilderie, so was there at the time of the Kelly gang's occupation of the town (February 1879). According to one account, Kelly admonished Steve Hart for taking Gribble's watch, on the grounds it was an inferior make, also that Gribble interceded with Kelly on behalf of a girl, whose riding horse the gang had appropriated.

=== Warangesda ===
Gribble was concerned at the number of local Aboriginal girls and women who had cohabited with white men, to be abandoned when they became pregnant. He determined on setting up a refuge where these women and their children were cared for, away from degrading influences, especially of alcohol. He lamented the fact that Victoria, with one tenth the Aboriginal population of New South Wales, had many Church and State missions, yet the larger colony had none, with the exception of the Maloga Aboriginal Mission School, run as a private philanthropy by Daniel Matthews and his brothers. Thanks to Gribble's efforts, and supported by the people of Darlington Point, an area was set aside by government as an Aboriginal reserve, dubbed Warangesda, a portmanteau of an Aboriginal word and "Bethesda", to mean "house of healing" or "house of mercy", and superintended by Gribble, who with his friend J. J. Lloyd and a handful of Aboriginal men performed the construction work.

His church at Jerilderie was Presbyterian, and at Rutherglen he regularly officiated at a church of that denomination, but he maintained membership of the Congregational Union of Victoria, and in any case, the mission had to be non-denominational to receive aid from the New South Wales Government. In 1880 the mission received government assistance, and was visited by the (Anglican) bishop of Goulburn, Mesac Thomas. Gribble joined the Anglican church, was made a stipendiary reader in 1880, deacon in 1881 and priest in 1883. In 1883, following a drop in financial support for the mission, he announced his resignation as superintendent, declaring his intention to start a mission in Western Australia, but was coerced into remaining. His health was failing however, and in March 1884 he left to recuperate in England, returning the following January much invigorated. While in England he was admitted a Fellow of the Royal Geographical Society, and published a booklet Black but Comely . . ., a plea for support of Australian Aboriginal missions based on his Sydney lectures, with a foreword by the Archbishop of Canterbury.

=== Western Australia ===
Four months later Gribble announced that he had been invited by the Anglican church in Western Australia to found a similar mission on the Gascoyne River, and with John Rushton, a Warangesda missionary, as his assistant, left for Shark Bay in July, travelling by ship to Fremantle, train to Perth, then the steamer Otway to Carnarvon. After a generally cordial reception by managers of the various sheep stations on the way to Dalgetty Reserve on the Kennedy Range, where a large area had been set aside for the Mission, he built a house and native hut, sunk a well, and conducted well-attended church services. Rushton obtained a position as teacher at the local school, and had nothing further to do with Gribble. Mrs Gribble and their five youngest children would arrive some five months later.

Trouble started in December 1885 when Gribble held a lecture "Only a Blackfellow" at St Georges Hall, Perth, and aired some of his criticisms about the way Aboriginal persons were treated up north. The settlers were outraged and (despite the West Australian 's advice to give him a long rope) called a public meeting at Carnarvon to discuss his allegations. The audience was hostile, and when Gribble attempted to speak he was howled down. The West Australian then came down heavily on the side of the settlers, and refused to publish Gribble's version of events. With the consent of his bishop, he favoured its competitor, the Daily News, with a copy of his journal, which included a number of personal observations and accounts from sympathetic residents. Extracts published by the Daily News included cases he witnessed of Aboriginal persons being tied together with chains, shackled round the neck. Among other abuses, he described how illiterate Aboriginal persons were induced to sign, with a pencil mark, a contract for life to dive for pearls, then were traded like slaves. On the sheep and cattle stations, Aboriginal men were assigned to squatters in a system not unlike the earlier "assigned convict" system of the eastern colonies, and females were taken as concubines and further ill-treated. And not all abuses were at the hands of individual settlers. He instanced the Flying Foam massacre, a retaliatory raid in the Pilbara region at which many Aboriginal persons were slaughtered, partly corroborated by one David Carly.

A systematic boycott of Gribble and his Mission began, subsequently extended to anyone bold enough (labelled "sneaks") to support him. A petition was drawn up and sent to the bishop, requesting removal of this priest who was interfering with the native labour system. Gribble was then obliged to travel to Perth to defend himself before the bishop and the Missions Committee. During the voyage on the steamer Natal he was threatened and assaulted by a group of squatters and pearlers, and forced to barricade himself in his cabin. Efforts to report his tormentors were stonewalled by officialdom, Perth lawyers, and possibly Governor Broome himself. Back at Carnarvon efforts were made to prevent building supplies he had purchased being unloaded. The Missions Committee viewed Gribble's "Letters to the Editor" detailing these events with "unqualified condemnation", and instructed him to have all his future correspondence vetted by them, a condition which offended his "Christian manhood".

In June 1886 Gribble left for Sydney to put his case to the Anglican primate (bishop Alfred Barry) and the Australian Board of Missions, but when the ship docked at Adelaide he was greeted with a telegram from the Missions Committee of Perth, who had met in his absence and decided to dispense with his services. His wife and youngest children were still at the mission station. His dismissal was welcomed by sections of the Perth press, to whom Gribble was a defiant, tactless, prying, boastful interloper. To alleviate his financial situation, a position (critics said a benefice) was found for him in Buli. He proceeded to sue The West Australian and its publishers Harper and Hackett for £10,000 for libel (several tens of millions in today's money), having called him a "lying, canting humbug" and much else. He also considered suing the Mission Committee for wrongful dismissal and the Dean of Perth for the wrongful revocation of his licence, which could only be applied for immorality.

==== The court case ====
The trial date was set back to 5 May 1887 to accommodate the West Australian, to the evident delight of its competitor, the Daily News. Rather than being heard before a jury as is usual for a libel case, the case was heard by Chief Justice Onslow and Justice Stone, sitting in banco, and went for a little over a month. Many witnesses testified as to the basic truth of Gribble's allegations, and the Chief Justice, summing up, was apparently about to decide for the plaintiff, when he astounded the audience by finding for the newspaper, saying that Gribble had shown little restraint in presenting hearsay knowledge as fact. His associate was more condemnatory and found against Gribble, with costs. Gribble had cited a number of cases where Aboriginal employees had been treated in a reprehensible manner, but most of those had been dealt with by the authorities, and did not reflect on the Colony as a whole. He had used the fact of a dearth of half-caste children, despite the widespread intimacy between settlers and Aboriginal girls and women, as evidence of (widely rumoured) infanticide. At least one newspaper had a good word for Gribble, saying he might have lost in court, but had won admiration from much of the country, and had stirred government into tightening the laws regarding employment of native labour. The West Australian and Western Mail were ecstatic, declaring the decision a victory for the Colony, gloating that Gribble had a day or two later "left the colony in a clandestine manner". The Governor of Western Australia, F. Napier Broome, who had earlier been criticised for an un-statesmanlike reference to Gribble's journal, now weighed in on the side of the newspaper, echoing its line that Gribble's attack had been on the whole Colony, and made available for publication detailed defences of his Government and the settlers.

=== Return to New South Wales ===
Gribble resigned his Bulli post in July 1888 and was promptly appointed travelling missionary general (or general superintendent of missions) by the Aboriginal Protection Association of New South Wales, and set about founding a mission at Copeland for the natives in the Barrington River region. He spent time inspecting the Warangesda, Maloga, Cumroogunga and Coudah mission stations, finding residents at Cumroogunga the most advanced academically. He found so many problems in the management of these facilities that the Daily Telegraph concluded that the only way Gribble could be satisfied with a mission was if he were "superintendent, missionary, manager, council and collector all in one". Gribble resigned.

In 1889 Gribble founded the church of St Stephen at Barmedman in the parish of Temora, with an Aboriginal home and a rectory "Illaville" about a kilometre from Temora on the road to Young. He stipulated that the church building would be available to any Protestant group for church services. The rectory, like the church, was of all timber construction, and burned to the ground six months later. That September, Gribble and Rev. Guelter Soares of Adelong (Gribble's old church) exchanged parishes.

=== North Queensland and last days ===
In June 1891 Gribble visited the Bellenden Ker Range with the aim of establishing an Anglican mission to the Aboriginal people in the area, where he was well received by officials but encountered lassitude and great need among the original inhabitants. He left Adelong to commence his mission early in 1892. The mission station, rather than at Bellenden-Ker, was established at Cape Grafton.

In September 1892 he suffered an attack of malaria accompanied by pleurisy, greatly affecting his lungs, and was admitted to Cairns Hospital. He returned to the mission station, and instructed his eldest son, Ernest Gribble, to take charge of the mission while he hopefully recovered in the milder climate of Sydney. In November he visited his old parish at Adelong, and in January 1893 was admitted to the Prince Alfred Hospital, where he was assessed as beyond help, and returned to his residence.

He died aged 45, either at his residence, on Silver Street, Marrickville, on 3 June 1893 or at the Prince Alfred Hospital. His remains were interred at the Waverley Cemetery.

== Recognition ==
- His headstone in Waverley Cemetery is inscribed "The Blackfellows' Friend"
- A monument was erected to his memory at Yarrabah, Queensland.

== Publications ==
- Gribble, John Brown (1879). A Plea for the [Aboriginal People ...] of New South Wales. Rex Nan Kivell Collection. Jerilderie: Samuel Gill & Co. OCLC 220553982. nla.obj-52756199 – via Trove.
- Gribble, John Brown (1885). Black but Comely, or Glimpses of Aboriginal Life in Australia. London: Morgan and Scott. OCLC 84755759.
- Gribble, John Brown (1886). Dark Deeds in a Sunny Land, or Blacks and Whites in North-West Australia. Perth: Stirling Bros. OCLC 953914753 – via Trove.

== Family ==
John Brown Gribble married Mary Anne Elizabeth Bulmer (29 March 1848 – 19 September 1928); they had four boys and five girls who grew to adulthood:

- Rev. Ernest Richard Bulmer Gribble (23 November 1868 – 18 October 1957) succeeded his father as superintendent of the Anglican Mission at Bellenden Ker, Queensland, re-established as Yarrabah on Point Grafton.
- Rev. Arthur Hazlehurst Gribble (1870–1951) of Barellan, New South Wales
- Amy Theodosia Gribble (5 May 1872 – 1933) married Edward C. C. Palmer in 1893, lived in Watsons Bay
- John Benjamin Herbert "John H." Gribble (1874–1968) married Elizabeth, lived at Wellington
- Ethel Marion Gribble (1879– ) married George Reeves (1861– ) in Queensland; married Fred Wondunna (1887– ) of Urangan, Queensland before 1920; they had five children was in charge of mission school, Yarrabah from 1902. Fred, artist in colored sands and an oyster diver, was a son of Willie Wondunna (c. 1836–30 September 1946), famed blacktracker of Fraser Island who died at Maryborough General Hospital.
- Evangeline Anne Elizabeth "Eva" Gribble (1881–1961) married Frederick Acland Palmer of Annandale on 8 April 1903, lived in Fairfield, then Vaucluse, New South Wales
- Stuart Livingstone Gribble (1886–1963) of Brisbane became Anglican 1900, married Mary Kate Hobbins 18 July 1908, lived Kangaroo Point, New South Wales.
- Illa Irene Gribble (29 August 1888 – 22 January 1967) assistant at Yarrabah married Fitzroy Stephen (20 January 1896 – 22 November 1978) on 13 Nov 1918 in Paddington, lived in Randwick.
- Stella Muriel Gribble (1890–1982) married William H. Bell of Watsons Bay on 20 October 1912
