= Maloga Mission =

Aboriginal mission Station in New South Wales, Australia

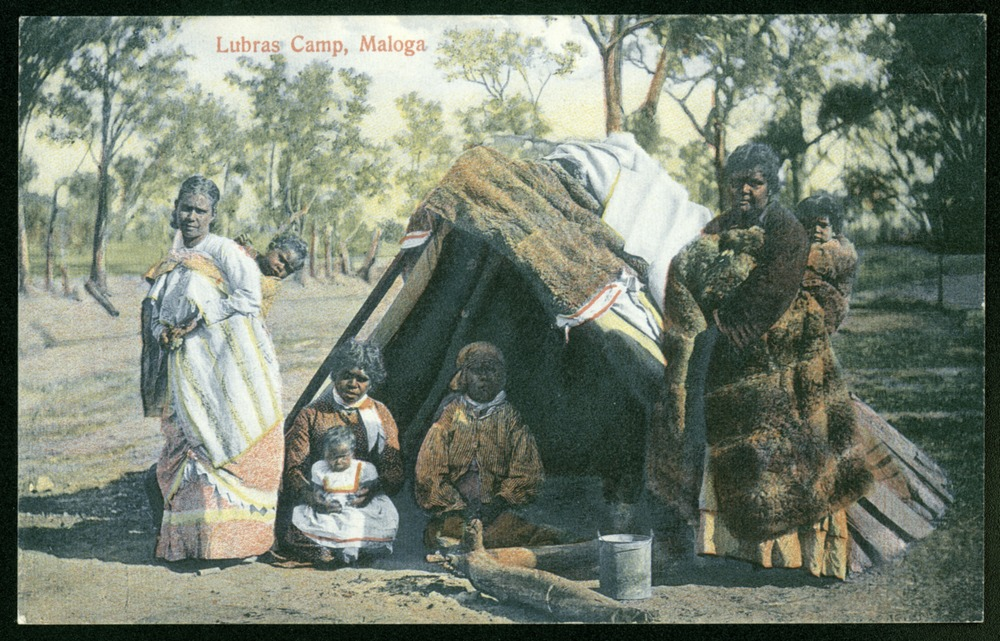
Aboriginal Australian women and children, Maloga, N.S.W. wearing European dress.

Maloga Aboriginal Mission Station also known as Maloga Mission or Mologa Mission was established about 15 miles (24 km) from the township of Moama, on the banks of the Murray River in New South Wales, Australia. It was on the edge of an extensive forest reserve. Maloga Mission was a private venture established by Daniel Matthews, a Christian missionary and school teacher, and his brother William. The mission station operated intermittently in 1874, becoming permanent in 1876. The Mission closed in 1888, after dissatisfied residents moved about 5 miles (8 km) upriver to Cummeragunja Reserve, with all of the buildings being re-built there.

The community at Maloga were people of the Yorta Yorta Nation and other groups from the Murray River region. There are reports of the Maloga cricket team competing with other teams in the area.

== Maloga Mission School ==
The Maloga Mission School was started in 1874. Janet Matthews, the wife of Daniel, was involved in teaching at the school. Annual reports from the school were published.

== Finance for the mission ==
The mission relied on public donations and the money earned by the Aboriginal men working at sheep and cattle stations in the area. Matthews lobbied the New South Wales government for financial support, including establishing the Committee to Aid the Maloga Mission in 1878, a committee which later became the New South Wales Aborigines Protection Association which, from 1881, began contributing to the mission's support.

== Mission records ==
Daniel Matthews wrote detailed reports on the Maloga Aboriginal Mission covering the years 1873-1891. The papers of Daniel Matthews include his diaries and mission reports, a draft constitution, and notes on the formation of the Association for the Protection of Aborigines of New South Wales (APA), dated 1878. There are many references to the Reverend William Ridley and the Reverend John B. Gribble of the nearby Warangesda Mission.

== Petitions ==
In April 1881, 42 of the Yorta Yorta men living at the Maloga Mission wrote a petition to the Governor of New South Wales, Augustus Loftus, requesting land. Daniel Matthews took the petition to Sydney on their behalf and it was published in the Sydney Morning Herald on 2 July 1881 and the Daily Telegraph on 5 July 1881, the same day that it was presented to the governor. Two years after the petition, land was reserved to create the Cummeragunja Reserve, about 4 miles (6 km) upriver from the Maloga Mission.

In 1882, the Maloga Mission, together with the Mission at Warangesda, the superintendent of which was J. B. Gribble, were the subject of a NSW Government enquiry, which made recommendations for improvements, increased resourcing and expansion of land used by the missions. It was critical that non full blood aboriginal children were allowed to stay at the mission rather than removing them from their mothers and undertaking work as domestic servants.

In July 1887, the Governor, Lord Carrington, visited Moama, and the reception included representatives from the Maloga Mission who presented the Governor with a petition requesting Queen Victoria grant land to the community. The petition was signed by Robert Cooper, Samson Barber, Aaron Atkinson, Hughy Anderson, John Cooper, Edgar Atkinson, Whyman McLean, John Atkinson (his mark), William Cooper, George Middleton, Edward Joachim (his mark). A later report described how:

"Jack Cooper, a young man, who has been trained and educated at Maloga, read an address of welcome, and presented a petition to His excellency asking that 100 acres of land may be granted to such Aboriginal men as are capable of farming, in order to support themselves and families and make a home. Lord Carrington and the Hon. Mr Burns, Colonial Treasurer, both replied, promising that our efforts on the part of the Blacks would meet with hearty support from the Government in every legitimate direction. Our party gave three cheers, and the school children sang a verse of "God save the Queen" with such sweetness as to elicty general applause."

By 1888, most of the residents of Maloga had relocated to the Cummeragunja Reserve, in protest at the strict religious rules of Maloga, and the Maloga buildings were moved to Cummeragunja Reserve. The name Coomerugunja was given to it by a superintendent appointed by "the Aborigines Protection Association in Sydney" (New South Wales Aborigines Protection Association?). Thomas Shadrach James continued as teacher at the new location, and was praised as a dedicated teacher by Matthews' son, John Kerr Matthews, who was one of his pupils.

Matthews apparently had some connection with the Aborigines Protection Association, but that ceased in April 1888. According to his wife Janet, he continued to be "engaged in work on behalf of the blacks". The couple stayed on at Maloga Mission, doing their "particular work", and were looking to establish a new mission at Bribie Island after the Maloga residents had left, but that never came to pass.

== See also ==
- Thomas Shadrach James
- William Cooper (Aboriginal Australian)
- List of Aboriginal missions in New South Wales
