= Blacks Camp =

- Location within New South Wales Location within Australia
- 32°33′39″S 148°58′38″E
- Location: University Road, Wellington, Dubbo Regional Council, New South Wales, Australia

Site notes
- Owner: New South Wales Land and Property Information (LPI)

New South Wales Heritage Register
- Official name: Blacks Camp; Black's Camp; The Spring Flats
- Type: State heritage (archaeological-terrestrial)
- Designated: 18 November 2011
- Reference no.: 1865
- Type: Occupational site
- Category: Aboriginal

Blacks Camp is a heritage-listed area in New South Wales, Australia. It is significant for its historical connections to the Wiradjuri indigenous people during the colonial era and early twentieth century, when the camp site formed part of a Christian mission station. Located on University Road, Wellington in the Central West region of the state, it is also known as The Spring Flats. Today the site is mostly vacant and agricultural land, including a residence owned by New South Wales Land and Property Information (LPI), an agency of the Government of New South Wales. The property was added to the New South Wales State Heritage Register on 18 November 2011.

== History ==
=== Indigenous peoples of the Wellington area ===
At the time of European settlement, the Wellington area was occupied by a group of Wiradjuri speakers. Wiradjuri designates the people of the land of three rivers; the Wambuul (Macquarie)), the Kalare (Lachlan River) and the Murrumbidjeri (Murrumbidgee River). Wiradjuri territorial lands are thought to have extended from the Great Dividing Range in the east and were bordered by the Macquarie, Lachlan and Murrunbidgee Rivers. Evidence of the occupation of the Wellington area by the Wiradjuri in pre-contact times survives in the form rock shelters with deposits, a carved tree, scarred trees, open camp sites, grinding grooves sites and bora (ceremonial) grounds.

European settlement in the Wellington area commenced with the establishment of a convict agricultural station in 1823. By 1839 most of the frontage of the Macquarie River was taken up by squatters, and the first land holders in the Wellington Valley area date from the 1830s. As European settlement in the Wellington area intensified, the Wiradjuri were increasingly driven off their traditional lands. The Wiradjuri moved to a series of missions and camps around Wellington including: The Wellington Valley Mission, Apsley Mission, Blake's Fall Mission (also known as Apsley Mission), Blacks Camp, Wellington Town Common Camp and Nanima Reserve.

=== Blacks Camp ===
Blacks Camp was a riverside Aboriginal camp that appears to have been a remnant part of Rev. William Watson's privately run mission known as the Blake's Fall Mission. Rev. Watson and his wife Ann arrived in Wellington Valley in 1832 as part of a mission team sent by the London-based Church Missionary Society to bring Christianity to the Wiradjuri People. A mission was established at the site of the former convict agricultural station in Wellington Valley.

Rev. Watson's policy of removing Aboriginal children from their families led to bitter confrontations between the Rev. Watson and other missionaries at the Wellington Mission. In c. 1839 Watson was dismissed by the Church Missionary Society. Watson and his wife left the mission along with a small group of Wiradjuri People and established a private mission, known as Apsley Mission, just outside the boundary of the Wellington Valley Mission site.

Approximately eight years after establishing Apsley Mission, Rev. Watson, his wife Ann and their small Aboriginal community of about thirty individuals, moved to a new site on the bank of the Macquarie River (portion 97 and portion 303 of the Parish of Wellington). Rev. Watson call the new site Apsley Mission, but it was also known as the Blake's Fall Mission.

Blacks Camp was situated on approximately 8.5 hectares (21 acres) of land adjacent to the site of Blake's Fall Mission. The camp, which was located approximately 1 kilometre (0.62 mi) north of the mission, is the earliest known Aboriginal camp in the Wellington district. The date the camp was established is not known but it is likely that Wiradjuri people were camping at the site during the period the mission was in operation. According to Wiradjuri elders, some of the residents at the camp came from outside the Wellington district, including women and children who survived a massacre in the Rylstone area. Blacks Camp continued to be used as an occupation site by the Wellington Aboriginal population after the mission site was sold to the Offner family and run as a dairy in c. 1866.

A profile of the camp's inhabitants in the early 20th century can be obtained from the 1908 application by Aboriginal families for a school. At the time the application was submitted, the population of the camp was about ninety people in fourteen households. Of the ninety or so residents, sixty of these were children, forty of whom were aged between four and fifteen. A few years later (c. 1910) the camp was inspected by the local Council's Sanitary Inspector. The Inspector reported that Blacks Camp comprised eighteen huts sheltering around eighty persons. In one three-roomed hut the inspector noted that as many as thirteen people lived and slept in the hut and he stated that other huts in the camp accommodated similar numbers. The inspector also noted in his report that a number of the camp's occupants suffered from lung troubles and several of the camp's residents had died from consumption.

In 1910 residents at the camp were relocated to the newly established Nanima Reserve, although it appears that a residual population remained at the camp site until c. 1940s. Today there are no standing structures on the site but building materials and artefacts left behind by former residents are scattered across the former camp site.

Oral testimony from Wiradjuri elders states that Blacks Camp contains burial sites. There are no headstones remaining to indicate the location of the graves. The camp site is thought to contain fourteen grave sites relating to the Dawkins, Goolagoon, Gotch, Holland, King, May, Mickey, Nolan, Riley, Stanley, Stewart and Wighton families as well as other families of Wellington and surrounding districts. In addition to the grave sites, the former camp site also contains two traditional Aboriginal sites: a scarred tree; and a shell midden.

=== Comparative analysis ===
As various areas in the State were settled by non-Aboriginal people, Aboriginal people were moved off their traditional lands. Displaced Aboriginal communities established camps on vacant land and reserves on the fringes of newly established settlements. Blacks Camp is one of two 19th-century Aboriginal camps known to have been established in the Wellington area.

== Description ==
Blacks Camp is an archaeological site approximately 8.5 hectares (21 acres) in size. The former camp site is located above the river crossing near Wellington, where Falls Road runs into the river at Nanima Falls. Blacks Camp is situated on land identified as Portion 74 of the Parish of Wellington, County of Wellington. There are no above ground structures, associated with the Aboriginal camp, on the site.

Today, part of the former camp site is occupied by a research station, operated by the University of New South Wales. The remainder of the site (approximately 65%) is vacant land. Structures associated with the research station include: a caretakers residence, above ground tanks, a number of sheds and adjacent to the house is a stock yard. A field at the southern end of the site is used for cultivation purposes.

=== Condition ===
As at 14 December 2009, a relatively small portion of the site (approximately 25 to 30%) has been subject to cropping and the site has also been subjected to river floods. Today, there are no standing structures associated with the Aboriginal camp on the subject site but building materials and artefacts, left behind by former residents, are scattered across the site.

There are no above ground structures present on the site. The site has been subjected to flooding and a section of the site has been cropped.

=== Modifications and dates ===
During the 1960s or 1970s a residence for the research station's caretaker was built on the site. Above ground tanks and a number of sheds have also been erected on the site. The southern end of the site has been used for cropping purposes. A small number of electricity poles are present on the site.

=== Further information ===
Under Commonwealth native title legislation a claim has been made by the Wiradjuri people for a broad land area in the Wellington district and this claim is likely to include Blacks Camp. Under NSW native title legislation a claim has been made by the Wiradjuri people for the subject lots. This claim has not yet been resolved. The above advice was received from John Gibbins, from the Department of Lands, on 11 January 2010.

The title documents indicate that the land is gazetted as a reserve.

== Heritage listing ==
As at 2 February 2010, Blacks Camp is the earliest remembered Aboriginal camp in the Wellington area. The former camp site is part of a sequence of post contact Aboriginal settlements in Wellington, where Wiradjuri people lived segregated from the town's people. The site has the potential, through archaeological relics and deposits, to provide information and insight into the demographics, living conditions, social organisation and cultural practices of Aboriginal people living in the Wellington area in the 19th and early 20th centuries.

Blacks Camp is significant to the Aboriginal community because the site tells part of the story of what became of the Wiradjuri people following the arrival of non-Aboriginal settlers in the Wellington Valley and the loss of Wiradjuri traditional lands. The former camp site is also significant to the local Aboriginal community as an Aboriginal burial ground and for its two traditional Aboriginal sites (a scarred tree and shell midden).

Blacks Camp was listed on the New South Wales State Heritage Register on 18 November 2011 having satisfied the following criteria.

The place is important in demonstrating the course, or pattern, of cultural or natural history in New South Wales.

Blacks Camp is the earliest remembered Aboriginal camp in the Wellington area. The former camp site is part of a sequence of post contact Aboriginal settlements in Wellington, where the Wiradjuri people lived segregated from the town's people. The site is associated with the displacement, dispossession and social isolation experienced by Wiradjuri community following the arrival of non-Aboriginal settlers.

The place has a strong or special association with a person, or group of persons, of importance of cultural or natural history of New South Wales's history.

Blacks Camp was a post-contact occupation site for Wiradjuri people displaced from their traditional lands. The site was occupied by members of the Wellington Aboriginal community from at least the early 19th century through to the 1940s. The Camp was also a place of refuge for Wiradjuri people from outside the Wellington area, including survivors of a massacre in the Rylstone area.

The place has a strong or special association with a particular community or cultural group in New South Wales for social, cultural or spiritual reasons.

Blacks Camp is significant to the Aboriginal community, because the site tells part of the story of what became of the Wiradjuri people following the arrival of non-Aboriginal settlers in the Wellington Valley and the loss of Wiradjuri traditional lands. The former camp site is also significant to the local Aboriginal community as an Aboriginal burial ground and for its two traditional Aboriginal sites (a scarred tree and shell midden).

The place has potential to yield information that will contribute to an understanding of the cultural or natural history of New South Wales.

The site has the potential to provide, through archaeological relics and deposits, information and insight into the demographics, living conditions, social organisation and cultural practices of Aboriginal people living in the Wellington area in the 19th and early 20th Centuries.

The place is important in demonstrating the principal characteristics of a class of cultural or natural places/environments in New South Wales.

The story of Blacks Camp, as a post-contact occupation site for Aboriginal people, is representative of the economic and social circumstances that many Aboriginal people found themselves in following the arrival of non-Aboriginal settlers.

== See also ==
- Wellington Convict and Mission Site
- Wellington Valley Mission
- List of Aboriginal missions in New South Wales
