= Whyman McLean =

Australian missionary and police tracker

Whyman McLean was an Aboriginal Australian man, a religious missionary who later served as an Aboriginal tracker in the New South Wales Police Force for thirty years until his retirement in 1925.

== Early life ==
Whyman McLean was born at Morago, New South Wales in approximately 1860. He was the son of Archibald McLean and Louisa, an Aboriginal woman. As a young man, Whyman lived on the Maloga Mission.

== Career ==
McLean worked for many years as a missionary, travelling to Brisbane, Sydney and Melbourne and raising money for the Maloga Mission cause. He also lived on the Warangesda Mission in the early 1890s.

In February 1897 Whyman became a tracker for the New South Wales police, based at Tumbarumba. After five years he transferred to Wagga Wagga. He served 28 years at the police station in Wagga and worked on cases as far afield as Gundagai. During his time on the police force he was responsible for the recovery of 34 bodies of people who had drowned in the Murrumbidgee River. He was also instrumental in tracking and capturing up to 120 fugitives who were brought before the courts.

Whyman McLean fell ill in December 1926 and was taken to Callan Park Hospital in Sydney where he died on 23 December 1926.
