= Warangesda Aboriginal Mission =

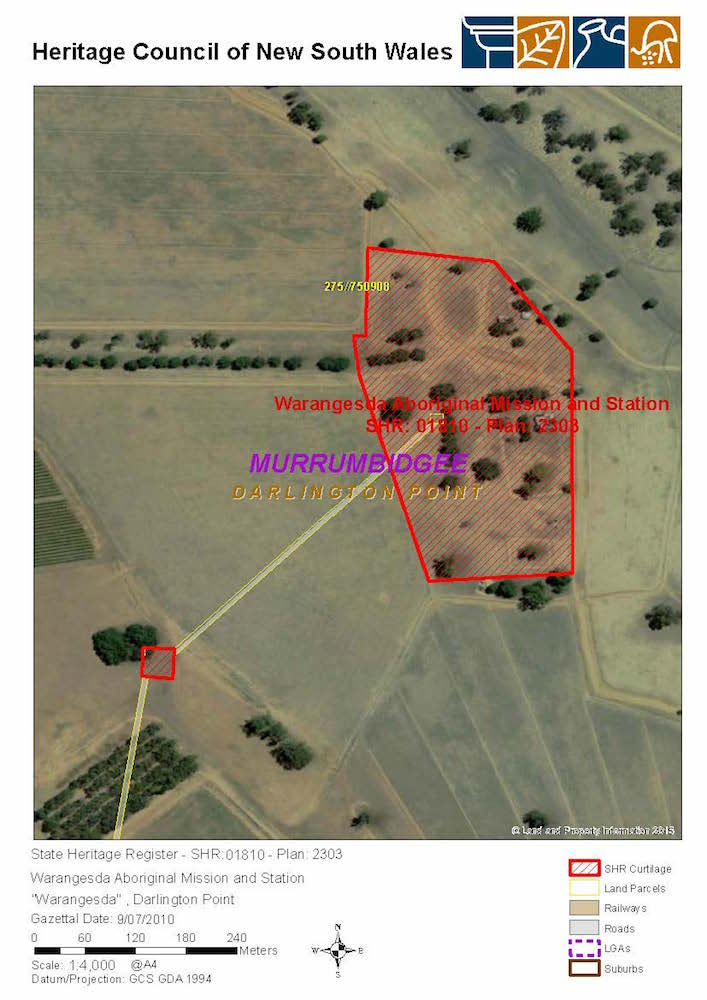
- Heritage boundaries

- Location within New South Wales Location within Australia
- 34°35′51″S 146°00′46″E
- Location: Warangesda, Darlington Point, Murrumbidgee Council, New South Wales, Australia

History
- Built: 1880–1926

Site notes
- Architects: Rev. John Gribble; Aboriginal people of Warangesda Mission (1880-1884)

New South Wales Heritage Register
- Official name: Warangesda Aboriginal Mission and Station; Warangesda Mission; Warangesda Aboriginal Station; Warrangesda
- Type: State heritage (complex / group)
- Designated: 9 July 2010
- Reference no.: 1810
- Type: Mission
- Category: Australian Aboriginal
- Builders: Rev. John Gribble; Aboriginal people of Warangesda Mission & Station

The Warangesda Aboriginal Mission is a heritage-listed former Australian Aboriginal mission site at Warangesda, Darlington Point, Murrumbidgee Council, New South Wales, Australia. The mission was designed and built between 1880 and 1926. It is also known as Warangesda Aboriginal Mission and Station, Warangesda Mission, Warangesda Aboriginal Station, and Warrangesda. It was added to the New South Wales State Heritage Register on 9 July 2010. The Naden (Lydia Naden) family as well as Florence (Cot) Johnson also lived at Warangesda.

== History ==
=== Pre-European Aboriginal land use ===
Stone tools found on the ground during farming activities at Warangesda suggest that the pre-European area of Warangesda was not so much a permanent camp, as an area visited for seasonal foraging and occasional ceremonies. The grass lands of the Riverina contained native cereals and plants with fruit or nuts that could be gathered by hand. Small portable grindstones were part of the basic equipment carried by Wiradjuri women along with their babies and young children. Larger game animals such as kangaroos were hunted by the men, roasted in an earth oven, formed by a shallow hole in the ground, containing ash and charcoal. Sometimes the hole was lined with stones or lumps of clay, or was dug straight out of an old clay termite mound. Traces of one Aboriginal oven were found near the Aboriginal hut area, suggesting that some aspects of traditional life continued into the mission period.

=== Colonial frontier: c. 1832 – c. 1841 and consolidation of pastoralism 1841 -1880 ===
By 1832 the first settler had arrived at Wiradjuri Land near Darlington Point and within a year the Murrumbidgee River frontage between Wagga and Darlington Point was fully occupied by Irish settlers. European colonial farmers occupied and sub-divided the land, displacing Wiradjuri hunter-gatherers and establishing Darlington Point as a small town. This had a direct impact upon the lives of Aboriginal people affecting their food sources, introducing disease and alcoholism and decimating their population.

Relations between the Wiradjuri and Irish settlers appeared to be good at first, but during the severe drought of 1838 these relations had deteriorated to the extent that white men formed armed posses to attack Aborigines. Wiradjuri reacted by mounting a guerrilla type resistance against the settlers. In 1841, posses of settlers trapped a Wiradjuri group on an island in the Murrumbidgee River (Massacre Island) in which an unknown number of Wiradjuri were massacred. This massacre marked the end of organised Aboriginal resistance in the region.

White settlers then weathered the 1840s depression, and drought. Increased stress on food resources began to force Wiradjuri into a steadily tightening net of dependence and poverty. At stations they received uneven treatment. This ranged from being welcomed as cheap labour to being shot on sight. The Government officials (Crown Lands Commissioners) also had various attitudes to Aboriginal people, ranging from compassion to hostility.

The 1850s brought a flood of people into NSW for gold and creating a booming market for meat, and when gold rushes dissipated, a source of cheap labour for the squatters. Rising wool prices in England brought increasing prosperity to sheep farmers. Many Wiradjuri were becoming dependent on the stations in winter, following traditional hunting and gathering mainly in spring. From 1861, the Free Selection Acts brought thousands of new settlers into Wiradjuri country.

=== Rev. John Gribble's Warangesda Mission (1879-1884) ===
Congregational, Methodist and later Anglican missionary, John Brown Gribble, founded the mission settlement to give Aboriginal people a permanent home. Warangesda was set up after the model of Maloga and earlier mission settlements, as an attempt to create a managed farming community out of the local Aboriginal population. By the 1870s, the Wiradjuri lived in groups of several related families as in traditional times, but some were able to work for settlers, taking government and station handouts when necessary. Men were paid wages for shearing, rabbiting (after 1880 when rabbits spread to the Riverina) or harvesting; women taking in washing and mending or working as domestics. More and more their lives circled the stations. It was in this historical setting, that Gribble travelled into the Riverina in 1878, encountering Wiradjuri people living in hunger and prostitution. Imprinted on Gribble's mind was his earliest childhood recollection of becoming separated from his mother. He was found by an Aboriginal woman who cared for him at camp and returned him home. This event came to assume a special significance for him in later life when he was reaching a decision about his destiny for missionary work. A mission in this context is defined as an Aboriginal settlement wholly organised by a missionary or missionary organisation. In the Wiradjuri language region, there have only been two missions. The first was the Wellington Valley Mission (including Rev Watson's continuation of the mission at Apsley and Blake's Fall). The only other subsequent mission in the Wiradjuri region was Warangesda, during the 1879 to 1884 period.

Gribble, a miner who became a missionary, was deeply affected by his observation of the exploitation of Aboriginal women in the Riverina of NSW in the early 1870s. This led him to set up a dormitory for women and their children at Warangesda or "Camp of Mercy" mission on the floodplain of the Murrumbidgee River. To the amazement of his friends, Gribble decided to leave his comfortable posting at Jerilderie and in 1880 arrived at a parcel of land on the Murrumbidgee whose lease had been revoked. Despite local opposition, he was granted the reserve, given permission to establish a government school for Aboriginal children, and paid a government teacher's salary. The name for the mission was chosen around the fireside one evening, combining "Warang" the Wiradjuri word for "camp" and "esda", the last part of the scriptural "Bethesda" (Hebrew meaning "house of mercy").

There was local opposition to the mission. Once a station hand rode in, waving a stirrup iron and threatening to kill anyone who came near him, and gave Gribble a fortnight to close the mission. On another occasion, a case of gin was sent in to get the women drunk. Whereas Gribble saw the mission as a way of protecting Aboriginal women from 'the white man's horrible passions' (which resulted in) ...traffic in the bodies and souls of the poor blacks'.

By the end of 1880, Gribble was able to write a newspaper article describing the mission. At that stage, seven houses had been built inside the ten-acre mission settlement, enclosed by a post and rail fence. There were 42 Aboriginal residents, of which two-thirds were said to attend the school. All of the building work had been done by the Aboriginal men. A 19th-century illustration shows the Warangesda mission at this stage. Other huts for Aboriginal families may also have been built which could have been spaced some distance from the main clearing within the original 507-acre (205 ha) reserve. The locations of such buildings are unable to be inferred although they may have been some 50 metres (160 ft) further to the north where there is a widely dispersed artefact scatter of domestic refuse.

Over the following two years, the mission became well established, the basis of its layout of the next 40 years up to its closure in 1924 was set. Gribble described the mission layout up to the building of the mission church in 1882:

"...quite a township sprung up in the lonely bush, consisting of my own dwelling, the schoolhouse, (which also served as a church), a number of two-roomed cottages for married couples, a home for girls, a hut for single men, store-room, outbuildings, and last but not least, a schoolmaster's cottage."

A separate girls dormitory was set up at Warangesda by 1883 and was first supervised by Mrs. Gribble as a home to mothers with their young children, single women, and girls. Although there was a school at Warangesda, the dormitory followed the institutional model of its time, and taught housekeeping skills to the girls to prepare them for respectable employment in menial duties at nearby stations. It also housed them separately in a building which included a dining room and kitchen as well as the dormitory room. Girls were brought in from many places and kept under supervision of dormitory matrons as well as Mrs. Gribble or the wives of later managers. Over its forty five years of operation, the people at Warangesda came to form a unified community, so that after the mission's closure, smaller communities were able to be formed nearby at Darlington Point and at the Narrandera Sandhills. The sedentary nature of mission life and other European ways such as yeomen farming, European dress and Christian belief, were underpinned by the continuing substratum of Aboriginal culture. There are hints in the historical record of the persistence of an enduring Aboriginal subculture at Warangesda.

One year the manager noted that two men arrived on the mission, after which '"the Aborigines had a Dance." The following year both the manager and Rev. Nobbs of Whitton agreed to send twenty five men to Hay to hold a corroboree in aid of the Hay Hospital. Aboriginal ceremony was seen as posing no direct threat to the Mission's objectives and looked on as pure performance rather than as a vehicle for the expression of Aboriginal culture. According to local lore, trees were marked near the infant burials at Warangesda. Some hunting and gathering continued to supplement shop bought foods.

During the mission period the desired, the most civilising method of subsistence was seen to be small scale farming. Yet continuing shortages of food supplies necessitated the occasional use of Aboriginal hunting and fishing knowledge. One recorded occasion when the mission ran out of meat, Aboriginal men were sent out on a hunt and returned in the evening with a kangaroo. The next two day hunting expedition returned with six kangaroos although it seemed a non-event to the manager who added: "Nothing important to note'". Gribble himself recorded one occasion when traditional fishing methods were used whereby "half a ton of fish" were speared in a downstream pool.

Gribble's diaries give the impression that while there was no lack of goodwill, the mutual incomprehension between the two cultures gave limited results. Gribble had set up the mission on the normal model of its time. The retaining of management in white hands, the assimilation in church and school and the removal of children to dormitories away from parental influence, were standard methods employed by conservative settlement missionaries, such as Gribble.

Nevertheless, mission life with its attempts to civilise the Aborigines brought changes to Wiradjuri culture. By about the turn of the century, English had practically replaced the Wiradjuri language, and rations of flour and tea had become food staples. Loss of confidence in the traditional Wiradjuri way was accompanied by a reshaping of their culture. A c. 1890s photograph of the mission church (AIATSIS collection) indicates that Wiradjuri regarded themselves as respectable people. They appear dressed in Victorian fashion, gazing confidently into the camera. After a nervous breakdown, John Gribble travelled to England to publish his book "Black But Comely" and to raise funds for Warangesda. But on returning, he found Warangesda's daily frustrations unbearable. He had been at Warangesda for four years. No longer able to continue at Warangesda, Gribble left to establish a mission in Western Australia. There he caused a furore amongst the settlers by writing an exposé of local mistreatment of Aborigines, "Dark deeds in a sunny land". In 1887 the mission was abandoned and Gribble returned to NSW, where he opened a mission on the Darling River for the Aborigines Protection Association. In 1889-90 he was rector of Temora in NSW where he built the first church. In 1892 he went to Queensland to open Yarrabah mission near Cairns. Suffering from malaria, he retired to Sydney where he died on 3 June 1893. His tombstone in the Waverley cemetery described him as the 'Blackfellows' Friend. His son Ernest Bulmer took over the running of Yarrabah mission.

=== 1884-1924: Aborigines Protection Assocn, then NSW Govt Board control ===
In 1884, the (private) New South Wales Aborigines Protection Association took on the management of the mission, subsidised by the NSW Government's Board for the Protection of Aborigines of NSW (also known as the Aborigines/Aboriginal Protection Board or APB), continued to run Warangesda as a self-sufficient "Aboriginal station". By 1891, the mission had 240 hectares (600 acres) already cleared, with 10 hectares (25 acres) remaining to be cleared. The Association continued to manage the mission (along with three other reserves or missions) until around 1894, after which the APB took over. There were 30 hectares (73 acres) were under wheat. As a supply of shade trees was ordered, it is likely that the main pepper tree plantings date from this period. A 1908 traveller described the Mission as comprising:

"... 810 hectares (2,000 acres) of land on which have been erected church, school, superintendent's residence, about a score of cottages for the blacks, and also a girls' dormitory. The station carries about 800 sheep, besides a few horses and cattle, and a little wheat growing is done ...The neat little white-washed one and two roomed cottages are occupied by about seventy (Aboriginal residents) ...but there have been times when nearly three hundred have been accommodated, though not all in the cottages of course ... The settlement is intended principally as a home for women and children and old men, and if any young able-bodied male(s) ...ever call in at Warangesda they are advised to seek outside work ...The men look after wheat growing and the stock, keep the fences and buildings in repair ...For this special work they are paid a small weekly wage, and men, women and children, of course, get their weekly allowance of rations. In addition the men earn good money by trapping rabbits, foxes and opossums, the skins of which are consigned to Sydney."

— A description of the mission in 1908.

Yet by 1916, the manager was requesting the Aborigines Protection Board for a pistol and handcuffs. Over the years to follow, many men were expelled from Warangesda and possibly an equal number of children were removed to institutions. The population of Warangesda was so reduced by 1924 that the Board was able to close it down and hand it back to the Lands Department as a rural lease. Within ten years of the manager being issued with pistol and handcuffs, the people of Warangesda had been expelled, the contents of their mission auctioned off, and the land offered to new settlers. By this time most of the residents had moved to riverside camps and to the reserve, several kilometres away.

After Warangesda was closed down, the profound consequences of resettlement had come to form an important element in older Aboriginal people's consciousness. Isobel Edwards remembered her childhood in the "mission" as a golden age, compared with later life outside. Excerpts of interviews with her provide one Aboriginal perspective on what was lost by the closure of Warangesda:

"Of what I remember, I think it was a very good place, very nice, but I was born there myself. I was born 76 years ago on 26 August 1909 and I grew up there until I was about 12. My first memory of Warangesda was what a beautiful little village it was, a real little town. There were two streets, the school, and of course they had a teacher for the school, houses on either side of the Church, and all the houses had fences round them, water laid on, and beautiful gardens with lots of flowers. I always thought old Jack Glass, Paddy's uncle, had the prettiest yard of the lot. Some of them had fruit trees, it was very pretty. Plus there were lots more people living along the river on the property in their own camps, in tents and shacks that they built. It really was a lovely place. Some of the houses had four rooms and some had two rooms. The Government supplied them with everything. They had a copper, a big iron boiler for washing and we were very well off from what I hear of other missions. There was a big pepper tree with a swing on it and all the children used to swing on it.

"It had its own school, its church and its manager's house and a dormitory at one time for all the girls that had nobody. It was like a little town. It had a couple of fruit shops and there was a little butcher shop. Shops were mostly on the end of verandahs- the cool drink shops, that is. It had all that and a general store. I can remember about 17 houses and then apparently they used to have quarters for single men, but that was before I can remember...

"They had the Church and the Minister used to come from Whitton. Every Sunday morning the Church was always full and they always had a good collection. When the old organ was played out, they gathered together and collected money to buy a new one themselves. My father bought the old one for 30 shillings and he sold it to his boss Mr. Beaumont when he left the Mission. He had it done up real good and his daughter, Mrs. Margaret Davies, told me it was left to her and she was putting it in the Pioneer Park in Griffith.

"My Dad (grandfather Stark), used to do a lot of droving, and of course they only had a horse and dray then and he used to be away for months at a time, so his family stayed at the mission. It was really good. You know, it had all its own machinery, ploughs and things like that. They sowed their own crops and stripped their own crops and sent them away to Sydney. They used to cart the wheat to Willbriggie. Willbriggie was a big siding then. They had their own horses and cattle and everything like that, sheep. They didn't shear at Warangesda though. They used to take the sheep out to Beaumont's shearing shed as there was no shearing shed at the mission. They did their own dipping, and killed their own meat at the butcher's shop. You didn't have to pay for the meat, it was given to you. We were all given rations: bags of meat, flour, baking powder, sugar, tea, salt, milk, soap, candles, and some had kerosene, the Mission gave them quite a lot of things and all free. They had their own butcher's shop and of course they killed their own beasts and cut them up a couple of times a week and it was given to all the people. Besides the rations, people also worked for pay and the men were paid 30 shillings a week. They would work harvesting wheat, cutting the hay and making haystacks to save the feed for the cattle when there was none. They did shearing, all sorts of jobs. It was very, very good. We'd milk the cows, walk a mile there at ten o'clock every morning. It really was a good place, not like others. When work was scarce at the Mission, the men used to go out and work on the stations for the cockies, shearing in the shearing sheds. Father used to go to Kooba Station every year, shearing mainly. He also worked at Tubbo Station, another big shed. He was a blacksmith too, they had their own little chaff cutter.

"Different managers did different things. One of them started a big vegetable garden down near the church. The vegetables were for everybody on the mission- they didn't sell them, they used to give them to us. Of course, another manager came along and pulled it out as it was too much extra work for him to see to. I think the managers broke the mission by being nasty and mean. There was a nice manager's house, a big white house. Different managers, came, and I don't know why but one of them pulled down all the fences round the houses and of course the gardens didn't last long then. Some of them were good to the people, some weren't quite so good. Some wouldn't have young people on the Mission doing nothing and they expelled the young people for no reason.

"A couple of old chaps had little shops and sold soft drinks, biscuits and lollies at the end of their verandahs. I used to go to the little shops with a penny and spend up big. One day I went up there to old Dick's and he said "Well young lady, what do you want?" I put the penny on the counter and I said, 'I'd like an apple, an orange, a banana, lollies, a drink and some biscuits.' And they all burst out laughing and his wife said "Well, give them to her!" So I got all this stuff for a penny and when I got home I got roused on. About 60 years ago, I think it was. It broke up when everybody moved away from it. There was nobody left so they closed it down."

— Isobel Edwards, Darlington Point.

In 1886, an epidemic of measles and diphtheria killed a significant proportion of adults and children on the mission. White people were not exempt from the ill health arising from those living conditions. Mrs Gribble's cousin (Mr. Carpenter) who was employed as the mission schoolmaster, contracted a chill whilst duck shooting and died a few days later from a respiratory infection. He was just 28 years old. In April 1889 the manager died from pleurisy and pneumonia.

Crowded conditions and shortages of flour and meat would have lowered the standard of health. A government official visiting in the year of the 1891 floods, noted that wind blew through the slabs of the girls' dormitory and that with the damp weather many people had colds which could turn into consumption. He recommended that the dormitory be lined internally with layers of canvas and paper. Later that same year a typhoid epidemic swept through Warangesda, killing several people including another manager, Mr. Clark. In one typhoid epidemic, all of the six children in one family were killed. The dormitory walls were finally lined and a fireplace installed three years later. In the same year, however, a critical article appeared in the Narrandera Argus which bitterly protested Eliza Murray's admission (she was dying of pleurisy and typhoid) from Warangesda into a public ward at the hospital stating that: The condition of the woman in question reflects strongly upon the management of the mission ...vice and vermin must combine to make the place in question something very far removed from a paradise.

Although statistics are not available for infant mortality rates in the Warangesda mission, the mortality rates in both Aboriginal and European families were high in comparison to present day conditions. The diaries record poignant detail of illness and death on the mission. One of the manager's duties was to arrange infant funerals and burials in the children's cemetery on the mission block. The mission experienced a short phase of government funded building and expansion in the 1896 to 1903 period. Warangesda seems to have become a self-contained and confident community that gave the Warangesda Aborigines a reputation among the local Europeans as "the aristocrats" of Aboriginal communities. At this time Warangesda was operated as a largely self-sufficient reserve, a so-called Aboriginal Station, with a population of up to one hundred and fifty people.

From 1909 onwards, the Aborigines Protection Act aimed to abolish reserves and fringe-camps by driving Aborigines off them, and into the white community. Regulations were drawn up for life on stations and reserves to make life amongst whites more attractive. The Board began an active policy of expulsion of young men so they would find work off the mission, light-coloured people which the Board defined as non-Aborigines, and children who were sent to be trained at institutions.

By 1920, according to Peter Read, a total of 41 men had been expelled, mostly on the grounds of breaking the station regulations, and possibly over a third of children at Warangesda had been put in institutions. Some households probably left to protect their children. The population of Warangesda was so reduced by 1924, that the Board was able to close it. Bill Gammage provides a vivid account of the closure of Warangesda:

"The news was a shock to the surviving residents. Knocker Williams first heard it from a white man in Darlington Point. 'Bloody hell", he said. The government cleared the people off and sold their property: at a big clearing sale in January 1925, 500 sheep, 9 cattle, 5 horses and a lot of plant were auctioned off. "They took the heart from the Aborigines when they did that", Knocker recalled. One old man, Jim Turner, who had helped John Gribble find the site in 1879 and laboured for the mission for 45 years, refused to leave. He stood defiantly defending his front door with a shotgun, but they pulled his roof down around him and left him to the ruins. He was still there in 1930, aged 85.".

The Aborigines Protection Act, which was intended to incorporate Aboriginal people into white society, in fact dislocated communities such as Warangesda. These were then forced to resettle in other camps and reserves. Some people such as Iris Clayton's family moved onto the river flats nearby, near the sawmill at Bunyip Bend or near Waradgery Beach. Others moved onto the Darlington Point Reserve (on a former police paddock). Communities also formed at the Narrandera Sandhills, Grong Grong, and at Three Ways, near Griffith.

The closure of Warangesda was part of a wave of reserve closures in the 1914 to 1926 period, which also closed the other large late 19th-century reserves in NSW: Brewarrina, Burnt Bridge and Cummeragunja. These closures may have been linked to the partitioning of soldier settler blocks, for soldiers returning from the First World War. Board policy to reduce Aboriginal reserves may have played a part: A view that Aboriginal people were being assimilated into the general population and that "real" Aborigines were a dying race and would no longer require land may have influenced policy.

=== King family farm 1927-1957 ===
In 1926, the land (originally 205 hectares (507 acres), later increased to 850 hectares (2,100 acres), later reduced to 661 hectares (1,634 acres)) was put up for sale by ballot and sold to a young farmer, Stewart King, in 1927. The mission buildings became the King farmstead and were adapted to farm use until 1957, when a new homestead and sheds were built beside Waddi Creek about a kilometre away. King's descendants have continued to farm the same land to 2009. The mission settlement site has remained part of the Kings' farm but was largely abandoned, used mainly for shed storage and stock grazing.

=== Warangesda as a founding settlement for other Aboriginal communities ===
The people that left Warangesda went out to other reserves and fringe camps and founded other Aboriginal communities. Groups at major Aboriginal settlements such as Warangesda, Brungle, Hollywood, and the Murrie forged distinct identities that were grafted onto earlier language group or tribal identity. Much of the present day Narrandera Aboriginal community is linked by kinship ties which can be traced back to the Bamblett family at Warangesda Mission in the 1880s.

Narrandera Sandhills Community

Following the closure of Warangesda Aboriginal station in 1925, the refugee households arrived at a former Cobb and Co. stop outside of Narrandera and set up the Sandhills community camp. Every Wiradjuri family in the Narrandera district has a connection with the Sandhills (also known as the Bottom Sandhills or Weir's Reserve). It was the largest community camp in Narrandera and was emptied by about 1940, when it was designated as a travelling stock route.

Hill 60 Community (Narrandera)

Some Aboriginal descendants of Warangesda and Narrandera families began buying blocks of land at Hill 60 as early as 1933, when Archibald Williams, Angelina Naden, and Norman Bright owned land there (1933 Narrandera Town Map, Dept. of Lands). Hill 60 reached its peak as an Aboriginal settlement over the 1940s when it was fully occupied by Aboriginal families. During the 1960s the settlement continued to shrink from about 30 to 20 Aboriginal households.

Darlington Point Reserve and town community

Within a few years of Warangesda mission being founded, an alternative camp to the mission block had formed on the river bank, half a kilometre away. Years later, when Warangesda was run by the government as an Aboriginal Station and had unpopular managers, the whole community would decamp to the river for weeks at a time. After it was closed in 1925, the refugees spread over a large area, some moving to Darlington Point reserve.

Erambie Reserve, Cowra

Although the reserve was declared as early as 1890, the Cowra Aboriginal population only began to swell in the early 1920s, mainly as a result of people leaving Warangesda.

== Description ==
The mission site is inside Warangesda station, which is a privately owned pastoral and agricultural property. The nominated site boundary contains four building ruins and a cluster of mission period archaeological remains. There are two surveyed cemetery reserves, one being inside the mission block, the second outside. A third cemetery is locally thought to exist, but by 2009 had not been able to be re-located by ground penetrating radar survey. Outside the site is a pepper tree row, until recently an avenue, along the original approach into the mission, and scatters of household wares in ploughed fields.

The general physical layout of the mission: Warangesda Mission was laid out along the lines of a formal "village". An archaeological reconstruction of its layout and sequence of transformations indicates the layout might be interpreted as follows: The Mission square measured approximately 110 by 90 metres (360 ft × 300 ft). Aboriginal houses were lined up along one side, and one passed through them to enter the mission square from a pepper tree avenue over a kilometre long. The church and flagpole occupied a central position opposite the row of Aboriginal houses, and the other mission management buildings, such as the school and girls' dormitory, occupied various positions near the perimeter of the mission square. The quadrangular layout and tree avenue entrance focused on the church as the key building: it was only after the gradual secularisation of the mission in the 1890s that the church began to lose its central position to the more dispersed layout of the government run Aboriginal Station. The mission structures included a range of designs from unusual designs through to standard "pattern-book" structures and buildings built to a special specification. The church, schoolmaster's cottage, ration shed and killing room (butcher's shop) chaff shed, saddlers store were conventional buildings of their time. The girls' dormitory had an unusual mono-pitch roof. A single men's hut was also built at Warangesda.

=== Sites of buildings and other structures ===
By 1993, there were only four surviving buildings. Research into oral history and written records, correlated with surface evidence, has provided more information about former buildings and their likely locations and details. John Gribble's mission was sited on the river flood plain and over the years many earth levees had to be built to keep out the floodwaters. These levees were topped up from time to time, and their weathered remains constituted a significant portion of the archaeological record in 2009. Most remains of earlier levees are unnoticeable in summer when the grass is high. In the late afternoon in autumn, the relics of levees and shallow depressions indicating post holes and toilet pits suddenly appear. Several building locations are inferable only from the traces of former levee banks or post holes. Most of the structures surviving in 2009 were built during the period under the Aborigines Protection Board. These include levee banks, schoolhouse, teacher's cottage, girls' dormitory and the ration store and all survive as ruins.

==== Mission church site ====
The mission church described by John Gribble stood for about a century. By 1980, it had been in use as a barn for many years and was a ruin. In the mid-1980s the church burned down. By 1993, the church site was a low mound, visible as a faint ground impression, with some fragments of charred timber. Ecclesiastical wares from the church are likely to have been transferred for reuse in churches of the surrounding region. The bowl used as a baptismal font, and church organ are believed to have been used in many parts of the district, and have turned up at the collections of the Pioneer Museum in Griffith. The mission church bell, lectern and bible were moved to the Church of England at Darlington Point.

==== School house ====
According to the Education Department's school file, the school house was renovated in 1910, including a new door, additional windows, a verandah with bench seating on wall-mounted brackets, as well as removal of the pit toilets. The existing schoolhouse was then substantially altered when adapted into a shearing shed by the Kings in 1941. Its conversion to form part of the shearing complex included new walls, doorways, verandah additions, slatted flooring, and all the equipment and fixtures required for a shearing operation.

==== Girls Dormitory ====
A children's dormitory was in use by 1887,. The existing building was probably built in 1896 when the manager noted that the "dorm" was nearly covered in and iron was being brought for the dorm verandah. To the west of the dormitory had been a house known from oral history as the manager's house. It was noted on the 1926 survey, and may have been the Gribbles' original hut, later converted to the manager's house. This slab hut would have fallen into disrepair by 1916, when improvements were required to be carried out on the dormitory buildings. These improvements would have included partitioning of the eastern end of the dormitory building to form separate living quarters for the manager. When Stewart King leased the farm, the dormitory was still intact and became his first homestead. When Stewart King married in 1941 he made improvements to the homestead, which would have included demolition of the old manager's house, removal of the western wing, a rebuilding of the western wall and verandah, and infilling of the verandah to form the laundry and bathroom. Both the old concrete path, and the kitchen and chimney are presently slightly off the line of symmetry. This would be rather peculiar for a late 19th-century building as symmetry was then usually a part of any ordered floor plan. However, with the western wing plotted on the plan to the same width as the existing bays, both the path and the kitchen appear along the axis of symmetry of the reconstructed floor plan. This confirms that both the path and the kitchen pre-date the removal of the western wing. It also suggests that the verandah, where the path stops, is part of the original building. Its mono-pitch roof is unusual for a building of this period.

==== Ration Shed ====
This building has collapsed and is now a pile of timbers.

==== Sites of outbuildings ====
Outbuildings dating from various phases of the site are represented as ruins or archaeological sites. Excavation would be required to produce a detailed analysis. One outbuilding archaeological site on a levee bank has been the subject of a detailed surface survey. It contains many artefacts that date from an earlier horse-powered phase of farm equipment. Several remains of other outbuildings are evident on the site. A comparison of the materials used and the technology of their construction indicates that they dates substantially from the mission period, undergoing later modification and adaptation to new uses in the King farm.

==== Reconstructing a sequence for the schoolmaster's cottage ====
Aboriginal mission residents helped an early schoolmaster, Mr. Carpenter to build his hut in the first years of the mission. There was a teacher's application for government assistance to repair the cottage in 1897 and an historical reference to the cottage being converted to a manual arts training workshop in 1907. A floor plan sketched in 1897 following a fire which destroyed the kitchen shows the new schoolmaster's cottage alongside the original slab hut. In 1907, a contractor was employed to carry out work on the new cottage, including removal of the slab hut. In 1940 the schoolmaster's cottage was turned into shearers' quarters. Artefacts in the existing building relate mostly to this shearing phase.

==== Cemeteries ====
There are two cemeteries, one was for children and is located within the "mission block" and the other was located a short distance away from the houses. Both sites are marked by trees. The Mission Cemetery has one headstone on site and the Children's cemetery has one grave marked by wrought iron palisade.

==== Portable Artefacts and archaeology ====
By 2009 there was exposed on the Warangesda mission site a variety of farm implements and other portable artefacts, left within and scattered about the surviving buildings. Saddlery equipment such as horse harness and stirrups, bits and the like are present, also remains of machinery, for example a horse-works, a horse-drawn stripper-harvester and the remains of a buggy lie on the ground.

Also dating from the mission period were school house artefacts dispersed through the site (1993 survey). These included small fragments of children's slates; the top of a large stoneware ink-pot; and a number of cast iron elbows which are similar to the school desk frames illustrated in 1883.

In amongst the assorted objects stored in the old ration store, was a meat saw, relating to this building's use as a butcher's shop at the mission. Frames from the girls dormitory beds appear variously as gates, portions offences and animal pens, sump covers and the like, scattered throughout the mission site.

A number of older hand-wrought implements on site relate to the mission period, including a foot-step for a wagon. Changes to the site, after the closure of the mission, are reflected in the artefacts. The schoolhouse was converted into a shearing shed with sheep pens. Some shearing machinery was installed in the building, although most of it was stored in and around the schoolmaster's residence, which was in use as shearers' quarters. Shearing clips, baling windlass, wool press and engine, represented by the cooling tank are all part of this assemblage, one piece of which was found at the church site. An extensive domestic refuse artefact scatter to the north covers an area of some acres. This scatter may represent at least two family hut sites, but is spread over such a large area that the scatter may be the relic of an extensive mission dump, spread by ploughing and trodden into the soft clay by grazing cattle.

=== Condition ===
As at 27 August 2009, the ration store had completely collapsed, the girls dormitory and school house have damaged roofs and partially collapsing walls. The teacher's cottage was in the best condition in that it retains its roof and walls.

The place has been impacted upon by storms, fire and agricultural activities. Only four buildings remain and these are in a ruinous state. There is considerable amount of archaeology on the site and it is possible to understand all phases of development. Remaining ruins include the school teacher's cottage, the school house, girls dormitory and ration shed in their near-original setting. Other relics include mission-period earthworks, tree plantings and well-documented archaeological sites of former buildings.

In 2009, Warangesda Mission contained a reasonably intact school teacher's cottage, ruins of the school house, girls dormitory and ration shed. Significant movable objects from Warangesda include pre-European stone artefacts and mission artefacts in collections at the Anglican Church, Darlington Point; Pioneer Park Museum, Griffith; and the National Museum of Australia, Canberra. Some manuscripts from Warangesda are in the National Library of Australia manuscripts collection.

=== Modifications and dates ===
Modifications to the site fall into clear phases, these being the original Christian mission (1880 – 1884), the government run Aboriginal Station (1884 – 1926), homestead occupation by Stewart King (1927 – 1957) and subsequent agricultural land use by his descendants (1957 to present day). Modifications during these phases have been complex and are summarised in archaeological site survey maps by Kabaila.

== Heritage listing ==
As at 21 August 2014, the Warangesda mission site contained a rare suite of Aboriginal Mission and Station building ruins and archaeological relics which demonstrate the evolving pattern of Aboriginal cultural history and the Aboriginal land rights struggle. The remains at this place provide a unique insight into the planning and development of a Christian mission and Aboriginal station in late 19th and early 20th century NSW. Warangesda is historically important for its institutionalisation of Indigenous Australians, of generational change and adaptation of that group. It is also the site of early political activism, including an Aboriginal community strike in 1883. The place has historic significance for its role in the founding or growth of other Aboriginal communities. The people forced out of Warangesda founded communities at Narrandera (communities at the Sandhills and Hill 60); at Darlington Point (communities at the Reserve and then in the town). It also added to communities such as Wattle Hill in Leeton, Three Ways Reserve in Griffith and Erambie Reserve at Cowra. Warangesda is highly significant to the Aboriginal communities of Narrandera, Darlington Point, and Cowra whom have a demonstrated cultural affiliation with the place. Warangesda Mission has outstanding social significance as a heartland for some important Aboriginal family networks in south-eastern Australia, including the Bamblett, Naden, Howell, Atkinson, Kirby, Murray, Charles, Little and Perry families. It is highly significant to the thousands of Warangesda Aboriginal descendants. The historic Aboriginal occupation of Warangesda was characterised by a relatively self-sufficient Aboriginal community that participated in the economic maintenance of the wider community by the provision of labour to local agriculture. The people also maintained a culturally distinct Aboriginal lifestyle firmly based on the maintenance of family connections over the wider region. Warangesda is rare in that it is one of only ten missions established in NSW. It is unique in NSW, as it is the only mission or reserve site in NSW to retain a suite of original 19th-century building ruins and archaeological relics. The place is significant for its association with the last great inter-group burbung (initiation) in Wiradjuri country which was held at or near Warangesda in the 1870s.

The Warangesda Mission girls' dormitory is notable because it became the prototype for the Aborigines Protection (later Welfare) Board of NSW Cootamundra Aboriginal Girls Home. The Cootamundra Home is highly significant because it was the central destination for Aboriginal girls across the whole of NSW who were removed from their families for training (the "stolen generations"). Warangesda is associated with the missionary Reverend John Brown Gribble an important historical figure who, with his wife, built the Warangesda mission with the help of Aboriginal people in the 1879 to 1884 period. Other significant associations include Aboriginal descendants of Warangesda well known in the history and cultural life of NSW such as political activist William Ferguson, country musician Jimmy Little, folk singer Kaleena Briggs and artist Roy Kennedy (1934 -) who has a series of works with a Warangesda theme. The archaeological remains and relics on the site at Warangesda and from Warangesda provide an excellent example of the many phases of development at an Aboriginal settlement site from 1880 to the present day. Warangesda contains burials in at least two cemetery sites (an infant cemetery and an adults' cemetery). In 2009, Warangesda Mission contained a highly intact school teacher's cottage, ruins of the school house, girls dormitory and ration shed. Highly significant movable objects from Warangesda include pre-European stone artefacts and mission artefacts in collections at the Anglican Church, Darlington Point; Pioneer Park Museum, Griffith; and the National Museum of Australia, Canberra. Some manuscripts from Warangesda are in the National Library of Australia manuscripts collection.

Warangesda Aboriginal Mission was listed on the New South Wales State Heritage Register on 9 July 2010 having satisfied the following criteria.

The place is important in demonstrating the course, or pattern, of cultural or natural history in New South Wales.

The Warangesda mission site contains a rare suite of Aboriginal Mission and Station building ruins and archaeological relics which demonstrate the evolving pattern of Aboriginal cultural history and the Aboriginal land rights struggle. The remains at this place provide a unique insight into the planning and development of a Christian mission and Aboriginal station in late 19th and early 20th century NSW. Warangesda is historically important for its institutionalisation of Indigenous Australians, of generational change and adaptation of that group. It is also the site of early political activism, including an Aboriginal community strike in 1883. The place has historic significance for its role in the founding or growth of other Aboriginal communities. The people forced out of Warangesda founded communities at Narrandera (communities at the Sandhills and Hill 60); at Darlington Point (communities at the Reserve and then in the town). It also added to communities such as Wattle Hill in Leeton, Three Ways Reserve in Griffith and Erambie Reserve at Cowra. The historic Aboriginal occupation of Warangesda was characterised by a relatively self-sufficient Aboriginal community that participated in the economic maintenance of the wider community by the provision of labour to local agriculture. The people also maintained a culturally distinct Aboriginal lifestyle firmly based on the maintenance of family connections over the wider region. Warangesda was the first Aboriginal school to become a government school.

The place has a strong or special association with a person, or group of persons, of importance of cultural or natural history of New South Wales's history.

The place is significant for its association with the last great inter-group burbung (initiation) in Wiradjuri country which was held at or near Warangesda in the 1870s. Warangesda is associated with the missionary Reverend John Brown Gribble an important historical figure who, with his wife, built the Warangesda mission with the help of Aboriginal people in the 1879 to 1884 period. Other significant associations include Aboriginal descendants of Warangesda well known in the history and cultural life of NSW such as political activist William Ferguson, country musician Jimmy Little, folk singer Kaleena Briggs and artist Roy Kennedy (1934 -) who has a series of works with a Warangesda theme.

The place is important in demonstrating aesthetic characteristics and/or a high degree of creative or technical achievement in New South Wales.

The Warangesda Mission girl's dormitory is notable because it became the prototype for the Aborigines Protection (later Welfare) Board of NSW Cootamundra Aboriginal Girls Home. The Cootamundra Home is highly significant because it was the central destination for Aboriginal girls across the whole of NSW who were removed from their families for training (the "stolen generations"). Historian Peter Read estimates that 300 girls were sent to service from Warangesda before 1909.

The place has strong or special association with a particular community or cultural group in New South Wales for social, cultural or spiritual reasons.

Warangesda is highly significant to the Aboriginal communities of Narrandera, Darlington Point and Cowra, who have a demonstrated cultural affiliation with the area. Warangesda Mission has outstanding social significance as a heartland for some important Aboriginal family networks in south-eastern Australia, including the Bamblett, Howell, Atkinson, Kirby, Murray, Charles, Little and Perry families. It is highly significant to the thousands of Warangesda Aboriginal descendants. This place is important to the Aboriginal community for social, cultural and spiritual reasons. The Wiradjuri people of central and western NSW, which includes descendants of people who were born in Warangesda Station prior to forced removal, have consistently and persistently asserted their cultural affiliation to the place. The site has outstanding social significance as a heartland for important Aboriginal family networks in south-eastern Australia, including the Bamblett, Howell, Atkinson, Kirby, Murray, Charles, Little and Perry families. It is highly significant to the thousands of Warangesda Aboriginal descendants. It is also significant to the local descendant community at Darlington Point, who have maintained strong links with the mission site to the present day. The site has high social significance for its role in the founding or growth of other Aboriginal communities. The diaspora from Warangesda founded communities at Narrandera (communities at the Sandhills and Hill 60); at Darlington Point (communities at the Reserve and then in the town). It also added to communities such as Wattle Hill in Leeton, Three Ways Reserve in Griffith and Erambie Reserve at Cowra.

The place has potential to yield information that will contribute to an understanding of the cultural or natural history of New South Wales.

The archaeological remains and relics on the site at Warangesda and from Warangesda provide an excellent example of the many phases of development at an Aboriginal settlement site from 1880 to the present day. Warangesda contains burials in at least two cemetery sites (an infant cemetery and an adults' cemetery). The place has yielded evidence of prehistoric occupation in the form of stone artefacts. The place has potential to yield further information that will contribute to an understanding of NSW's Aboriginal cultural history. The archaeological research potential and educational value of the mission site (including its buildings, ruins, earthworks, cemeteries, farming artefacts, sites of former buildings and tree plantings) is extremely high. The place has in the past been used as a burial site.

The place possesses uncommon, rare or endangered aspects of the cultural or natural history of New South Wales.

Warangesda is rare in that it is one of only 10 missions established in NSW. It is unique in NSW, as it is the only mission or reserve site in NSW to contain a suite of original 19th-century building ruins and archaeological relics.

The place is important in demonstrating the principal characteristics of a class of cultural or natural places/environments in New South Wales.

The place is important in demonstrating the principal characteristics of both Aboriginal missions and Aboriginal Stations (managed reserves) of NSW. Building ruins and archaeological relics at Warangesda provide an outstanding example of an Aboriginal mission settlement site.

== See also ==
- List of Aboriginal missions in New South Wales
