= Wellington Convict and Mission Site =

- Location within New South Wales Location within Australia
- 32°34′31″S 148°57′04″E
- Location: Curtis Street, Wellington, Dubbo Regional Council, New South Wales, Australia

History
- Built: 1823–1844

New South Wales Heritage Register
- Official name: Wellington Convict and Mission Site – Maynggu Ganai; Wellington Valley Settlement; Wellington Aboriginal Mission; Government Farm Site
- Type: State heritage (landscape)
- Designated: 22 March 2011
- Reference no.: 1859
- Type: Post-contact Site
- Category: Aboriginal

The Wellington Convict and Mission Site is a heritage-listed former convict agricultural station, Australian Aboriginal mission and cemetery located at Curtis Street, Wellington in the Dubbo Regional Council local government area in New South Wales, Australia. It was built between 1823 and 1844. It is also known as Wellington Convict and Mission Site – Maynggu Ganai, Wellington Valley Settlement, Wellington Aboriginal Mission and Government Farm Site. The property was added to the New South Wales State Heritage Register on 22 March 2011.

== History ==
Wellington was founded as a convict agricultural station in 1823, the only Government settlement after Bathurst, west of the Blue Mountains. In 1827 "special" convicts, i.e. middle class or educated convicts who were thought to be receiving special attention were removed to Wellington to keep them out of sight. By 1831 convicts had erected buildings for the Commandant, military, stores, engineers, blacksmiths, carpenters, government officials and the convicts as well as structures such as a lime kiln and stockyards. From 1825, the settlement also housed the Police Magistrate, several constables and the Mounted Police. In 1831 the convict agricultural station ceased operation leaving behind only a small military presence. The London-based Church Mission Society moved into the settlement to create an Aboriginal mission. The mission was originally attended by two couples Rev William Watson and his wife Ann, who were the first appointed to this position by the London-based office, and Rev Johann Handt, a German missionary with experience in Liberia, and his wife Mary Crook, eldest daughter of the renown South Seas missionary, William Pascoe Cook. The missionaries abandoned the settlement in 1844.

The Wellington Valley Settlement Site is located in the valley formed by the junction of the Bell and Macquarie rivers. The original inhabitants of this land are the Wiradjuri people here referred to as the Wellington Wiradjuri. The ethnological and archaeological evidence discussed in the Conservation Management Plan for the Maynggu Ganai Historic Site by Griffin NRM shows that there is considerable evidence of the Wellington Wiradjuri's relationship with the land, which includes the Settlement Site, prior to the arrival of Europeans. The journals kept by the missionaries show that the cultural and material practices of the Indigenous inhabitants were continued after the European settlement was established. In the 1820s settlement by Europeans at Bathurst grew rapidly, the population increased dramatically along with the amount of land occupied and cleared. This caused tensions between Aboriginal people and the colonists, with Governor Brisbane declaring martial law for a period in 1824. Wellington Valley was at this time considered to be the outer limits of the colonial frontier. There was no official settlement in the area apart from some unofficial grazing.

A government presence was established at Wellington Valley to provide a secure outpost for further settlement and growth of the colony. The valley was occupied as a convict agricultural station in 1823. Lieutenant Percy Simpson was put in command of establishing the settlement and within three years had cultivated 120 hectares (300 acres) of land and constructed 40 buildings with the labour of 80 convicts. From 1926 the colonial government began winding back the numbers of convicts sent to Wellington with a view to reducing the overall scale of the settlement.

This changed when in 1827 the settlement became the destination for difficult convicts or "specials". The treatment of middle or upper class convicts had been of concern to the colonial administration for some time. There was unease that these convicts were given preferential treatment that did not reflect their criminal status. It was recommended by Commissioner Bigge that they be given light work and banished from the centres of population. From 1827 these "special" convicts were sent to Superintendent John Maxwell at the Wellington Valley Settlement. One of the Overseers at the settlement, George Brown, was convicted of the murder of a seven year old Aboriginal girl. Governor Darling insisted Brown be tried: "the natives should be satisfied that whites are made answerable for every outrage committed against them." This was an early instance in Colonial Law where the rights of Aboriginal people were upheld. By 1830 the settlement was becoming "costly and unproductive." There were very few convicts remaining at the settlement and the agriculture station finally ceased operation in December 1830. By comparison with other penal settlements such as Port Macquarie, Moreton Bay or Norfolk Island; Wellington was a small enterprise which had minimal support from the Colonial Office. It was established exclusively as an agricultural enterprise (albeit on a small scale) on the inland frontier of the colony, whereas all the others were on the coast. Part of the settlement continued to be used by the government for military use in order to defend the frontier and provide security in the area. The rest of the settlement was given to the Anglican (London) Church Missionary Society.

Augustus Earle, an artist, visited the site in 1826 as part of his travels with the Beagle. He painted Aboriginal people, the Wellington Caves, Government House and the Wellington area. Conrad Martens sketched and painted scenes around Wellington in late 1820s and early 1830s.

=== Missionaries ===
The first missionary sent to Wellington Valley was John Harper who previously worked at the Blacktown Native Institution. Harper spent 1825 and 1826 at the settlement and published reports about his interactions with the Aboriginal population in the Sydney Gazette. These accounts are the earliest written record of Aboriginal society in this area.

The Secretary of State for the Colonies invited the Church Missionary Society (CMS) to establish a mission for Aboriginal people, giving assurances that it would be supported from public funds. Governor Bourke obtained funding from the Legislative Council and gave the Church Missionary Society permission to occupy the Government buildings in the Wellington Valley convict settlement, forming the Wellington Valley Mission, one of the earliest to "Civilize and Christianize" Aboriginal people in Australia. The Rev William Watson, a member of the Church of England, and the Rev Johann Simon Christian Handt, a Lutheran minister, together with their wives, arrived in the Wellington Valley on 3 October 1832. They were granted 10,000 acres (40 km^{2}) and £500 per annum to run the mission. The cost of transporting supplies from Bathurst or Sydney was extremely high and as local supplies would reduce the cost, crops of wheat and maize were planted and stock including sheep, cattle and pigs were grazed. Rev Watson became known to Aboriginal people as "Eaglehawk" as he a reputation for kidnapping or removing Aboriginal children to the Mission. A drought in the early days made it almost impossible to provide enough food for the mission. On Saturday 2 March 1833 Watson recorded the following in his journal. "Our men attempted to plow [sic], but broke the coulter [blade] immediately owing to the ground being so dry and hard. We have had very little rain for a long time. Our garden and indeed vegetation in general is almost parched up. Scarcely any food for the cattle."

By 1835 the mission station showed prosperity but little evidence of spiritual advancement. There was a growing uneasiness about the effectiveness of the mission and evidence of conflict with the settlers, the judiciary and between the missionaries themselves. In 1837 Handt moved away because of his wife's poor health and was replaced by James Günther who also fought with Watson. William Porter worked as the Agriculturalist from 1838 to 1842, but was later found to have acted inappropriately towards some of the Aboriginal women around the mission. Watson attempted to gain control of any Aboriginal children he could get his hands on, gaining a reputation as an eagle hawk, and kidnapper among the Aboriginal women. Eventually Watson left Wellington Valley and, taking the children with him, established a new mission called Apsley.

In 1839 the Church Missionary Society decided that the Rev Watson should be removed. Watson went ahead to establish a more successful private mission about four miles from the settlement on the Macquarie River (Apsley Mission). The Rev Gunther continued to operate the mission at the settlement but his annual reports of 1841 and 1842 showed little hope for the success of the venture. The Church Missionary Society withdrew its support and after a personal inspection by Governor Gipps, the Mission Station at Wellington Valley was closed in 1844.

== Description ==
The Wellington Convict and Mission Site is located south of the town of Wellington, it is on the slope of the hills facing to the west. The site is an archaeological site which is located under paddocks, roads and various urban development such as the western portion of land to Mitchell Highway (Curtis Street) which is partially covered by backyards, houses and fences.

There are no standing buildings or ruins from the convict or mission occupation. The most important building, Government House, was located on the brow of the hill looking out across the Bell River and the valley. The soil of the site is red clay loam of basaltic origin with a covering of weeds. There are a number of Kurrajong and Ironbark trees on the slopes and on the brow of the hill. There is little other vegetation.

The possible foundations of a number of the original buildings have been tentatively located and identified from the maps of the period and the descriptions of the site given in journals and in reports to the Government and the Colonial Office. Remnants of the settlement include: Government House foundations, about 10 centimetres (3.9 in) under the soil and river pebbles at the site on Lot 1 DP 120160; remains of a blue granite path on Lot 58; foundations of two military barracks; foundations of two mud huts on Lot 355; three dumps of original handmade bricks at the site of Government House on Lot 1, under trees on Lot 58 and on Lot 50; and Artefactual material (including horseshoes and lengths of chain) which may date from the settlement.

Pioneer Cemetery located on Lot 7018 of DP 1020768 also forms part of the subject site. The cemetery was established by the first commander of the convict station, Lieutenant Percy Simpson, 500 metres (1,600 ft) away from the convict settlement. The earliest burial dates from 1825. The cemetery reportedly contains burials of Aboriginal people from the missionary period of the site, along with former missionaries Reverend Watson, his wife Anne and their infant child.

=== Condition ===
As at 4 October 2001, Lots 49–50, 56, 58–59 of DP 756920, Lots 1–2 of DP 129997, Lot 1 of DP 405152 and Lot 1 of DP 120160 have been used mainly for agricultural purposes and are relatively undeveloped. Archaeological relics and deposits (such as the remains of walls, fences, wells, rubbish pits and privies) relating to the early convict station and mission, may be present on these lots. Agricultural activities (ploughing for example) are likely to have disturbed archaeological material located in the upper layers of the soil, on some of these sites. The Maynggu Ganai Historic Site CMP indicates that there has been some displacement of artefactual material as a result of erosion.

Lots 1–4 of DP 156995, Lots 361–362 of DP 578699, Lot 355 of DP 531300, Lot 216 of DP 756920 and part Lot 324 DP 43505 have been substantially disturbed by later development which includes residences and associated structures, industrial and agricultural buildings. As a result of this development and associated landscaping activities, archaeological material present on these sites is likely to have been removed or be found in a disturbed context.

Cypress and Watson Avenue, Wheelers Lane and the Mitchell Highway run through the Wellington Convict and Mission Site. Archaeological relics and deposits may lie under these roads. Road works will have disturbed archaeological material in the upper layers of the soil but deeper deposits may be intact.

Archaeological evidence has been previously identified on a triangle of land between the Mitchell Highway and the Old Bathurst Road alignment has had located on this site.

The site has a high degree of integrity as a large portion of the site has never been built on. Areas that do have built structures are one phase buildings as their location on the outskirts of a rural town has alleviated any pressure for development.

=== Modifications and dates ===
The mission settlement was abandoned in 1844. Following the closure of the mission, the settlement buildings were dismantled for their bricks another materials useful to the residents of Wellington and surrounds.

== Heritage listing ==
As at 12 November 2010, Wellington Convict and Mission Site – Maynggu Ganai is a rare cultural landscape with extensive archaeological evidence of the second colonial outpost established on the frontier west of the Blue Mountains. It was established in the 1820s as a convict agricultural station and by 1827 had become a destination for educated or middle class convicts or "specials". The place was the centre of ongoing first contact between the Wiradjuri and the British settlers. The contact between the two cultures and the way each subsequently evolved is part of the physical history of the place. Occurring on the frontier of the colony the settlement made possible subsequent pastoral expansion. It has the potential to provide rare physical evidence of the way of life at a remote rural convict settlement. The place has very high potential to reveal new information about an inland convict agricultural station; providing material for comparative analysis of later sites. The convict station later became the first inland Aboriginal mission in Australia and is an early example of the forced institutionalisation of Aboriginal children. The place is of high social and cultural significance to the Wellington Wiradjuri in particular the descendants of those associated with the Mission. The place has social significance for its role as the original Wellington settlement and it plays an important role in defining the cultural identity of the town of Wellington.

Wellington Convict and Mission Site was listed on the New South Wales State Heritage Register on 22 March 2011 having satisfied the following criteria.

The place is important in demonstrating the course, or pattern, of cultural or natural history in New South Wales.

The Wellington Convict and Mission Precinct is historically significant as the site of the first ongoing contact between British colonists and the Wellington Wiradjuri. The settlement occurred on the frontier of the colony and made possible subsequent pastoral expansion. The place is historically significant as a remote convict agricultural station for difficult and "educated" convicts. It provides rare physical evidence of the way of life at a rural convict settlement. The murder of an Aboriginal girl by Overseer Brown and the 1927–28 court case is important evidence of early application of colonial law in relation to Aboriginal people. The Wellington mission was the first inland mission in Australia and the first of a series of missions around Wellington. The mission archives are in themselves highly significant due to the record of the Wiradjuri culture made by the missionaries, including a record of the Wiradjuri languages. The Wellington mission is historically an early example of the forced removal of Aboriginal children from their families.

The place has a strong or special association with a person, or group of persons, of importance of cultural or natural history of New South Wales's history.

The Wellington Convict and Mission Site is historically associated with the Indigenous people of the Wellington Valley (Wiradjuri) for whom the place was a site of prolonged first contact with the colonists.

The place is important in demonstrating aesthetic characteristics and/or a high degree of creative or technical achievement in New South Wales.

The Wellington Convict and Mission Site's cultural landscape has some aesthetic value associated with its location on hills overlooking the Bell River and the surrounding mountain peaks and ranges. The landscape is a relatively intact rural colonial landscape which has had minimal change since it was depicted by Augustus Earle in 1826.

The place has strong or special association with a particular community or cultural group in New South Wales for social, cultural or spiritual reasons.

Wellington Convict and Mission Site – Maynggu Ganai, is of social and cultural significance to the community of Wellington and the wider Indigenous community. Descendants from the original Wellington Wiradjuri have an association with the place, particularly through the descendants of those associated with the Mission. To the Wellington community the place plays an important role in defining the cultural identity of the town of Wellington, as the place where the town originated.

The place has potential to yield information that will contribute to an understanding of the cultural or natural history of New South Wales.

The archaeological remains and documentary evidence relating to the Wellington Convict and Mission Site have the potential to contribute new knowledge about the past of Wellington, and about the history of culture contact, convictism and missions in Australia and in the broader colonial world. The place has very high potential to reveal information that may not be available from other sources. Whilst the written records for the site are extensive and refer to at least 40 buildings, the entire settlement may have had many more structures which can only be found through further archaeological investigation. Existing documentary research is reasonably extensive however the physical evidence of the place has never been fully investigated. The archaeology of the Wellington Convict and Mission Site is likely to reveal otherwise unknown information about rural convicts and cultural exchange between the Wiradjuri and colonists on the frontier. The Wellington mission is one of the earliest mission sites and is likely to be the most intact archaeological site of the early missions. The place has the potential to provide new understanding on the convict agricultural station and early colonial trade and exchange; providing material for comparative analysis of later sites.

The place possesses uncommon, rare or endangered aspects of the cultural or natural history of New South Wales.

The Wellington Convict and Mission Precinct is a rare archaeological site. The site was originally a convict agricultural station from 1823 and an Aboriginal mission until 1845. It has the potential to provide rare physical evidence of a convict agricultural station providing a unique opportunity to understand the rural convict. The site also has the potential to provide the earliest surviving physical evidence of an Aboriginal mission, other than Blacktown Native Institution. The Wellington Convict and Mission site was the location of the first Anglican mission and the first inland mission in Australia.

The place is important in demonstrating the principal characteristics of a class of cultural or natural places/environments in New South Wales.

The Wellington Convict and Mission Site has the potential to demonstrate aspects of 1820s rural convict stations in NSW and of pre 1850s missions sites in NSW. The site also has the potential to demonstrate aspects of both British and Wiradjuri culture throughout a period when both groups were adapting to changing conditions.

== See also ==
- Blacks Camp
- List of Aboriginal missions in New South Wales
