= Wellington Valley Mission =

Wellington Valley Mission was a Church Missionary Society (CMS) mission near Wellington, New South Wales, and one of the earliest attempts to "civilise and Christianise" Aboriginal Australians. It was founded in 1830 and closed 12 years later, in 1842.

The CMS established the mission in 1832, led by the Rev. William Watson and Rev. Johann Simon Christian Handt. They were granted 10,000 acres (4,000 ha) and £500 per annum to run the mission.

A drought in the early days made it almost impossible to provide enough food for the mission. On 2 March 1833, Watson recorded the following in his journal: "Our men attempted to plow [sic], but broke the coulter [blade] immediately owing to the ground being so dry and hard. We have had very little rain for a long time. Our garden and indeed vegetation in general is almost parched up. Scarcely any food for the cattle."

The mission was also plagued by internal quarrelling and rumours. In 1837, Handt moved away because of his wife's poor health and was replaced by James Günther, who also fought with Watson. Another man, William Porter, joined the mission to assist with the cultivation of the land, but was later found to have acted inappropriately towards some of the Aboriginal women. Watson attempted to gain control of any Aboriginal children he could get his hands on, gaining a reputation among Aboriginal women as an "eagle hawk" and kidnapper. Eventually, Watson left Wellington Valley and, taking the children with him, established a new mission called Apsley.

The mission was closed in 1842 after ten years of difficulty and little success.

== See also ==
- Blacks Camp
- List of Aboriginal missions in New South Wales
- Wellington Convict and Mission Site
