= New South Wales Aborigines Protection Association =

Support group for Aboriginal Australians

The New South Wales Aborigines Protection Association, also known as NSW Aborigines Protection Association, Association for the Protection of Aborigines, Aborigines Protection Association and Aboriginal Protection Association, was a private body which supported Aboriginal Australians in New South Wales, Australia. Specifically, it administered Maloga Mission until the residents moved to Cumeroogunga (which it then administered), and the mission stations at Warangesda and Brewarrina.

The organisation grew out of the Committee to Aid the Maloga Mission, which was created by founding missionary Daniel Matthews on Maloga Mission in 1878. The New South Wales Aborigines Protection Association was established in 1880 "for the purpose of ameliorating the present deplorable condition of the remnants of the Aborigine tribes of this colony".

After the Board for the Protection of Aborigines was created by the New South Wales Government on 26 February 1883, it started subsidising the three stations, which however continued to be administered by the Association. In 1892, Association income dwindled and the management of the stations was handed over to the Board. The Association continued until at least 1895, by which time they also had some oversight of La Perouse Mission.
