= List of Aboriginal missions in New South Wales =

Aboriginal missions in New South Wales, together with reserves and stations, were areas of land in New South Wales where many Aboriginal people were forced to live due to government laws and policies. The missions were established by religious individuals or churches and they were controlled by those churches and missionaries with limited government involvement. More than ten missions were established in NSW between 1824 and 1923. Relocation to missions denied Aboriginal people access to their traditional lands, hunting grounds, and sacred sites, and disrupted kinship systems.

The origin of laws seeking to protect Aboriginal people in the Australian colonies and to provide religious instruction and missionaries can be found in the Report of the Parliamentary Select Committee on Aboriginal Tribes, (British settlements.) which was presented to the House of Commons of the United Kingdom by the Parliamentary Select Committee on Aboriginal Tribes in 1837. The missions were primarily run by Christian churches, whose religious teaching and western values greatly influenced day-to-day life for the communities. In New South Wales, there were two non-denominational Missions, the United Aborigines Mission (UAM) also called the Australian Aborigines' Mission (AAM) and the Australian Inland Mission (AIM). The United Aborigines Mission published the Australian Aborigines Advocate, a magazine documenting their activities.

== The missions ==
- Apsley Mission (c.1839–?) a private mission, set up by Reverend William Watson after he was dismissed from Blakes Fall Mission, near the boundary of the Wellington Valley Mission site
- Blake's Fall Mission (1832–?) established by Reverend William Watson for London based Church Missionary Society
- Bomaderry Aboriginal Mission (1908–88) United Aborigines' Mission
- Bowraville Aboriginal Mission and School (1923–?) Roman Catholic
- Brewarrina Aboriginal Mission also known as Brewarrina Mission Station, Old Brewarrina Station (1886–1967) United Aborigines' Mission
- Goulburn Island Mission Station (1916–?) Methodist Church
- Lake Macquarie (Ebenezer) Aboriginal Mission (1824–41) London Missionary Society
- La Perouse Aboriginal Mission (1885–?) United Aborigines Mission
- Maloga Aboriginal Mission Station (1874–94)
- Parramatta Aboriginal Mission (1820–28) Church of England
- St Clair Aboriginal Mission, also known as Singleton Aboriginal Mission, it was renamed Mount Olive Reserve (1893–1923) Aborigines' Inland Mission
- Sydney Aboriginal Mission
- Warangesda Aboriginal Mission (1879–1920) Church of England / Australian Board of Missions
- Wellington Valley Aboriginal Mission (1832–42) Church Missionary Society

== See also ==
- Category:Australian Aboriginal missions
- List of Aboriginal Reserves in New South Wales
